= Samuel C. Lancaster =

American landscape architect

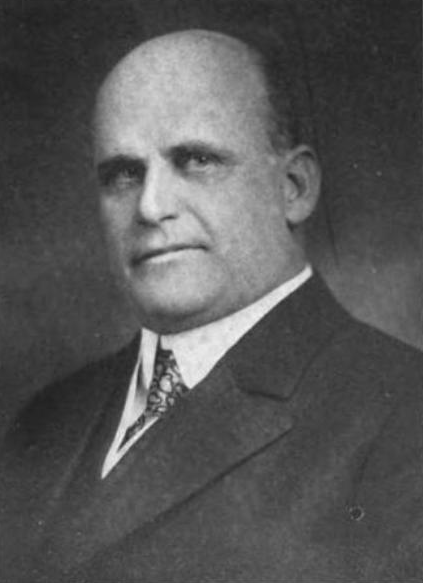
- Born: Samuel Christopher Lancaster; 1864; Magnolia, Mississippi
- Died: March 4, 1941 (aged 76); Portland, Oregon
- Occupations: Architect, engineer

Samuel Christopher Lancaster (1864 – March 4, 1941) was an American engineer and landscape architect, known for his work on the Columbia River Highway.

== Biography ==
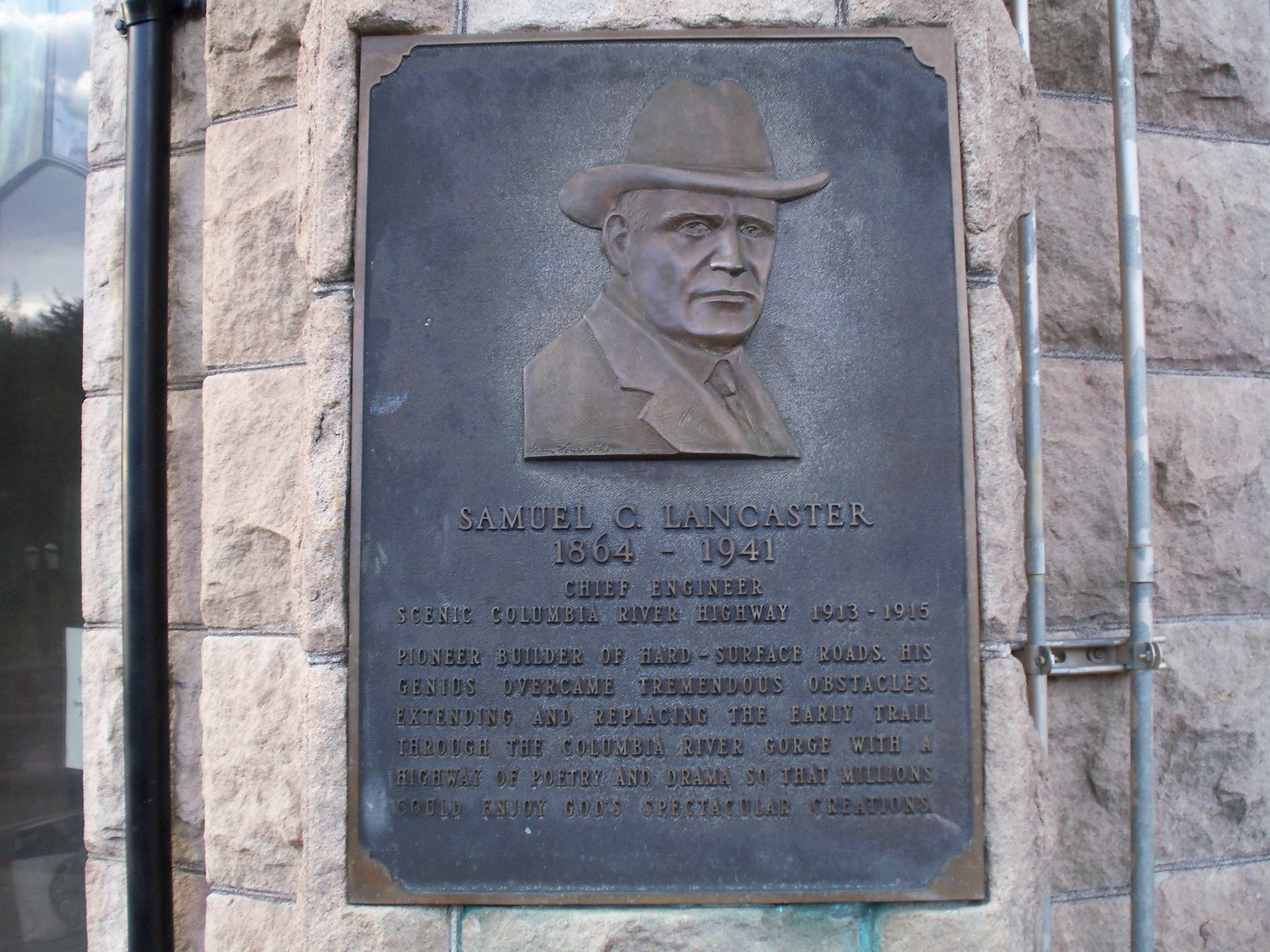
Samuel C. Lancaster plaque at Crown Point

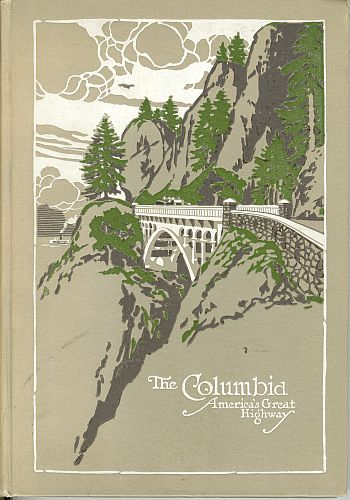
Cover of The Columbia: America's Great Highway Through the Cascade Mountains to the Sea by Lancaster, 1915

Samuel Lancaster was born in Magnolia, Mississippi in 1864, and grew up in Jackson, Tennessee.

He came to Oregon in 1908 and was hired by Sam Hill to design his experimental roads at Maryhill in 1909. He did a plan for the campus of Linfield College before beginning supervision of the Columbia River Highway in 1913. He also promoted Crown Point as the site of an observatory.

Lancaster was instrumental in the building of the 7-mile Larch Mountain Trail, which begins at the Multnomah Falls Lodge and climbs to the summit of Larch Mountain. The trail was completed in September 1915. In October 1915, he founded the Trails Club of Oregon and became its first president.

He died from leukemia at his home in Portland on March 4, 1941.
