= Maryhill State Park =

State park in the U.S. state of Washington

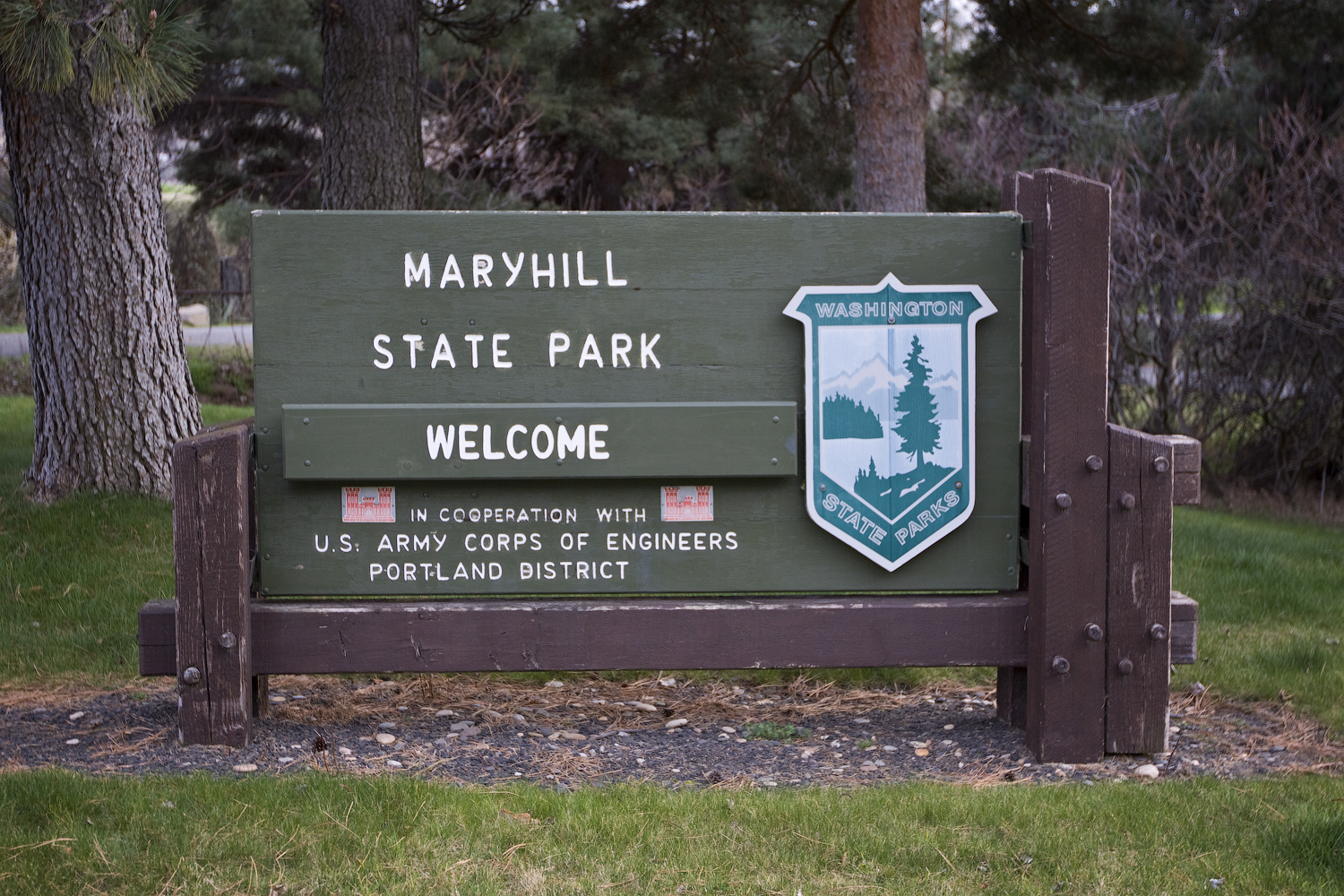

- Location within Washington (state) Location within the United States
- Location: Klickitat County, Washington, United States
- Coordinates: 45°40′56″N 120°50′02″W
- Area: 81 acres (33 ha)
- Established: 1972
- Administrator: Washington State Parks and Recreation Commission
- Visitors: 168,130 (in 2024)
- Website: Official website

Maryhill State Park is a public recreation area on the Columbia River in Klickitat County, Washington. The 81-acre (33 ha) state park offers 4,700 feet (1,400 m) of shoreline and facilities for camping, hiking, boating, fishing, and swimming. The Maryhill Stonehenge, a full-scale concrete replica of Stonehenge, stands on a bluff not far from the park.
