= Samuel Hill =

American businessman, lawyer and railroad executive

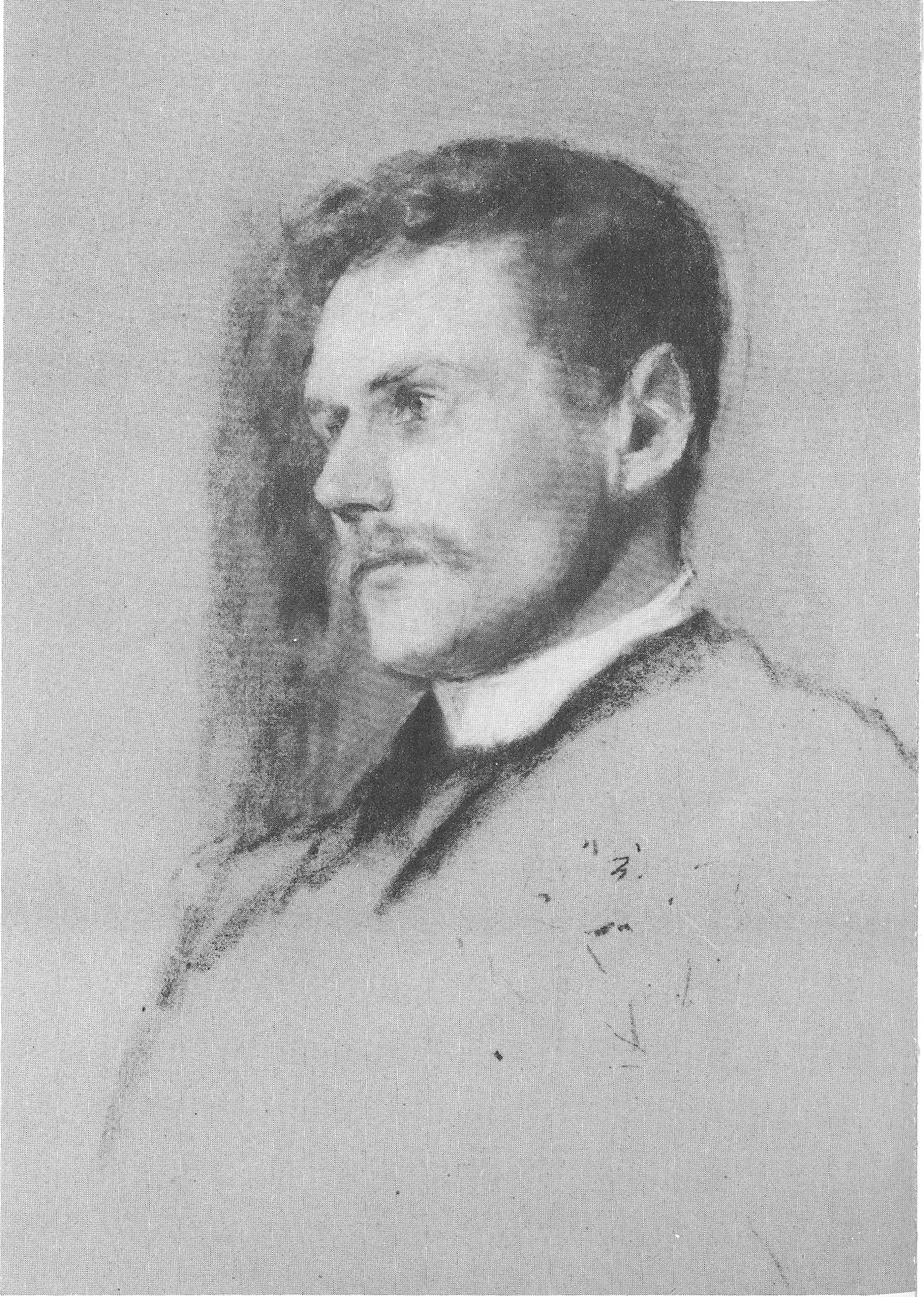
- Sketch of Hill by Gabrielle D. Clements
- Born: May 13, 1857; Deep River, North Carolina, U.S.
- Died: February 21, 1931 (aged 73); Portland, Oregon, U.S.
- Resting place: Maryhill Stonehenge, Maryhill, Washington, U.S.
- Education: Haverford College (1878); Harvard University (1879)
- Occupations: Businessman, lawyer, railroad executive
- Political party: Republican

Samuel Branson Hill (May 13, 1857 – February 26, 1931) was an American businessman, lawyer, railroad executive, and advocate of good roads. He substantially influenced the Pacific Northwest region's economic development in the early 20th century.

His projects include the Peace Arch, a monument to 100 years of peace between the United States and Canada; the Maryhill Museum of Art; the Maryhill Stonehenge replica; and the Maryhill Loops Road. His promotion of paved, modern roads is possibly his greatest legacy. He is remembered for his initiative to build the Columbia River Highway, connecting the Columbia Gorge with scenic byways.

== Early life and education ==
Sam Hill was born into a Quaker family in Deep River, North Carolina. His family was displaced by the American Civil War and Sam grew up after the war in Minneapolis, Minnesota.

Hill graduated from Haverford College in 1878 (also his father's alma mater). At Haverford he studied Latin, Greek, French, and German as well as mathematics, science, English literature, logic, rhetoric, and political science.

He attended Harvard University for a year to receive a second bachelor's degree in 1879. At Harvard he continued his Latin and history ("Colonial History of America" under Henry Cabot Lodge) and studied forensics and philosophy ("German Philosophy of the Present Day" and "Advanced Political Economy"). Despite attending only one year, he became an extremely active Harvard alumnus, serving for several years on the Harvard Board of Overseers even though it required many transcontinental trips each year to attend meetings. He also joined (and, at times, led) Harvard Clubs in several cities in the U.S.

== Early career and relocation to Seattle ==
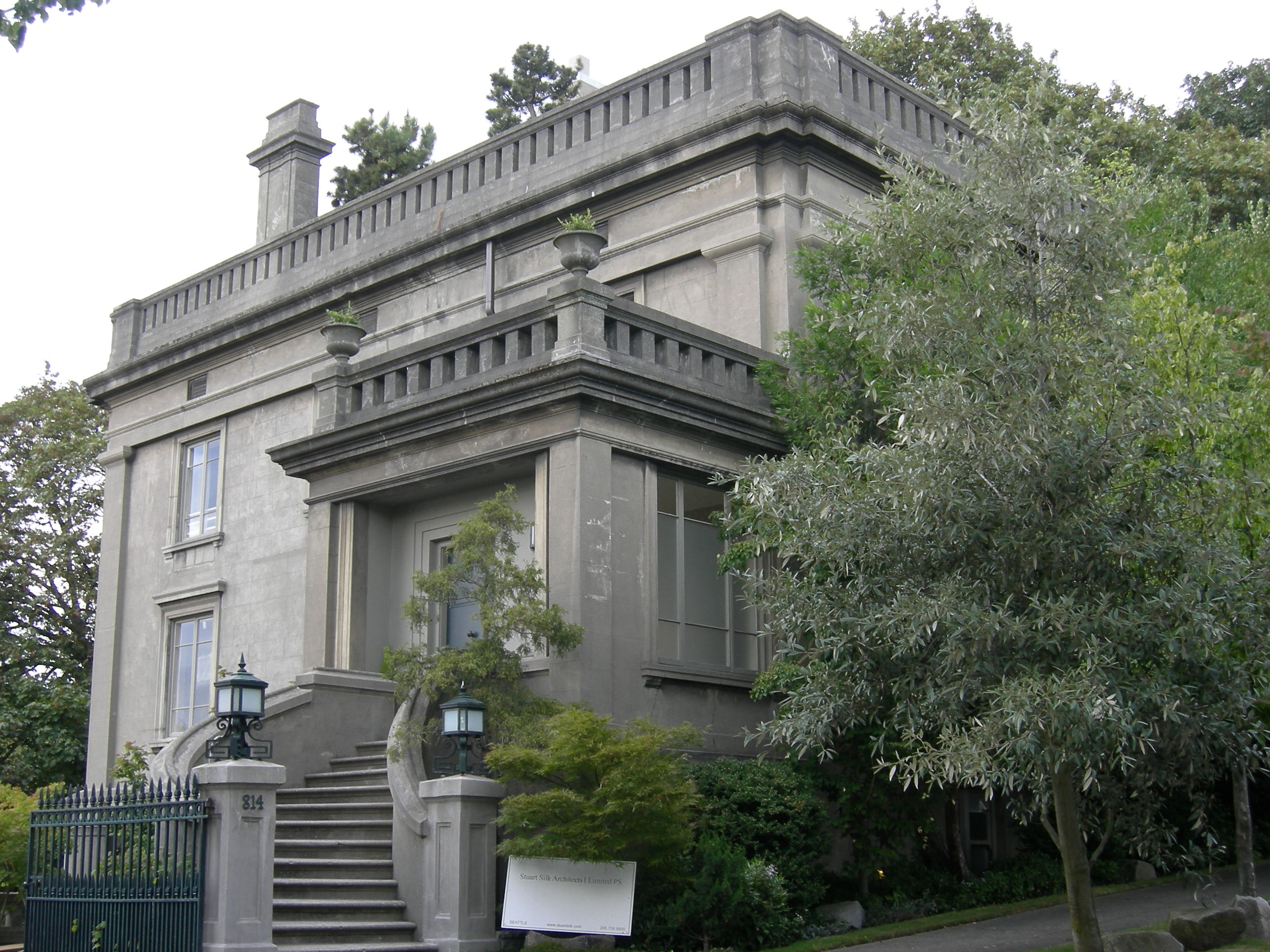
Hill's 1910 concrete mansion in Seattle, designed by Washington, D.C. architects Hornblower and Marshall

After Sam Hill graduated from Haverford College in 1878 and Harvard University in 1879, he returned to Minneapolis to practice law. A number of successful lawsuits against the Great Northern Railway attracted the attention of the railway's general manager James J. Hill, who hired Sam to represent the railway. In 1888 Sam Hill married James Hill's eldest daughter Mary.

For over a decade, Hill played an important role in his father-in-law's business endeavors, both at the Great Northern and as president of the Minneapolis Trust Company. However, around 1900 they had some type of falling out, the nature and degree of which is unclear; it is not even clear whether the falling out was over business matters, Sam and Mary's difficult marriage, or possible early symptoms of Sam's manic tendencies. In any event, the break was not a sharp one: The two men continued a friendly correspondence in business matters.

After a 1901 journey across Russia on the then not-quite-completed Trans-Siberian Railway, Hill settled in 1902 in Seattle, Washington, where he had major interests in the Seattle Gas and Electric Company, which was focused mainly in the coal gas business.

Hill had announced his intention to settle in Seattle in December 1900, but his wife Mary did not take well to the Northwest and moved back to Minneapolis after six months in Seattle, with their two children and without Sam. He stayed in Seattle and embarked on a number of ventures in the Pacific Northwest.

== World traveler ==
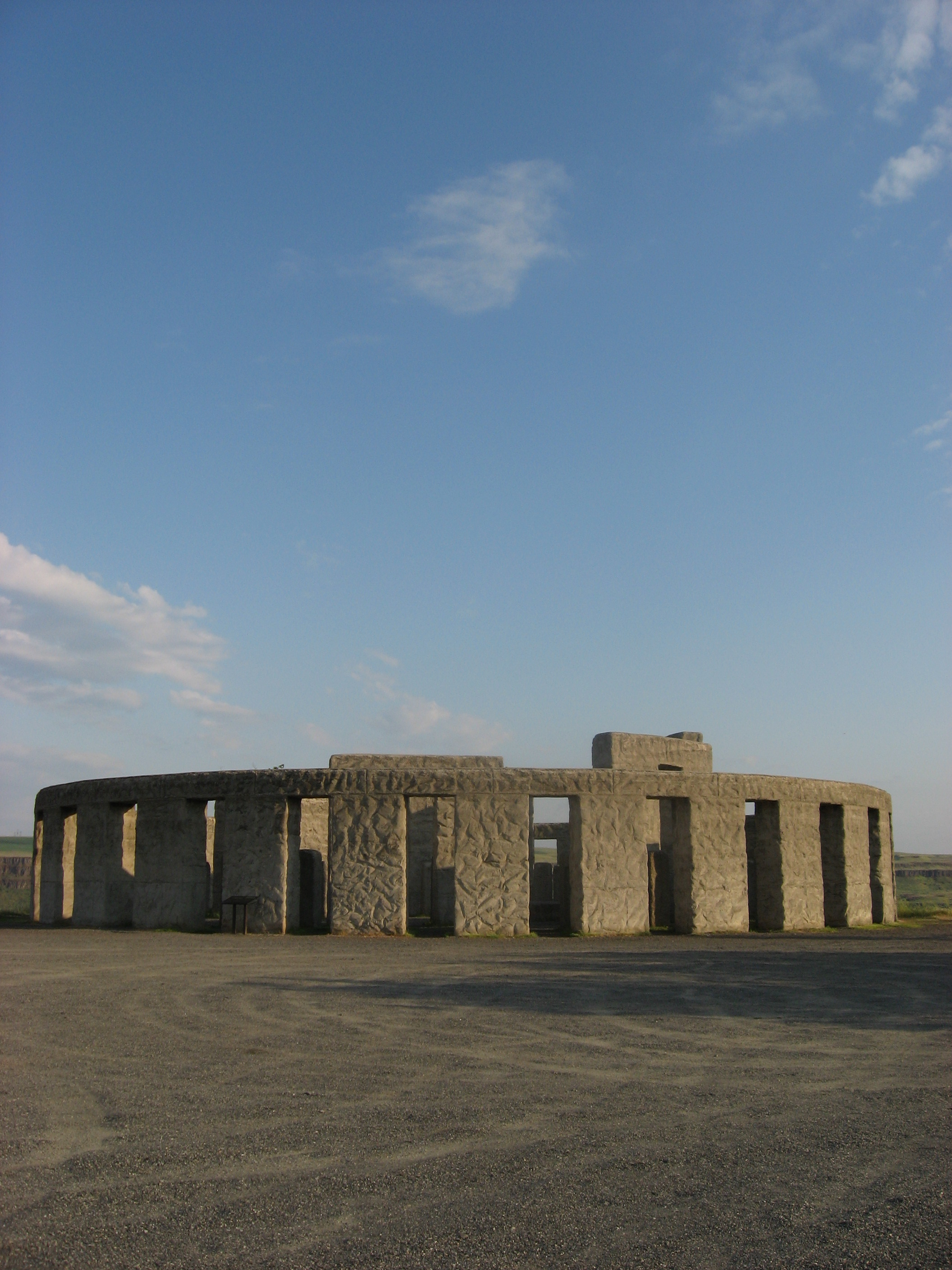
Maryhill Stonehenge replica and war memorial

Sam Hill was an "inveterate globetrotter". He was fluent in German, French, and Italian, and learned at least a moderate amount of Russian. Hill made at least fifty separate trips to Europe in the course of his lifetime and visited Japan nine times between 1897 and 1922. All of Hill's extensive travels were during an era when transportation was limited to surface vehicles and vessels.

In the early 20th century, Hill was the only American member of the Geographic Society of Germany. He continually gathered harbor depth soundings and information about ocean temperatures in order to map ocean currents. He had this information added to high-quality custom-made globes of German manufacture repeatedly commissioned from 1902–1914, which Hill gave as gifts.

Among the friends Hill made in his travels was King Albert I of Belgium, who made him a Commander of the Crown and Honorary Belgian Consul for Oregon, Washington, and Idaho. Hill and his friend Joseph Joffre (the Marshal of France) made an around-the-world trip together in 1922. He also befriended Queen Marie of Romania, who granted him the Order of the Crown in the Degree of the Grand Cross. Her 1926 visit to the United States was largely at his invitation.

== Enterprises ==
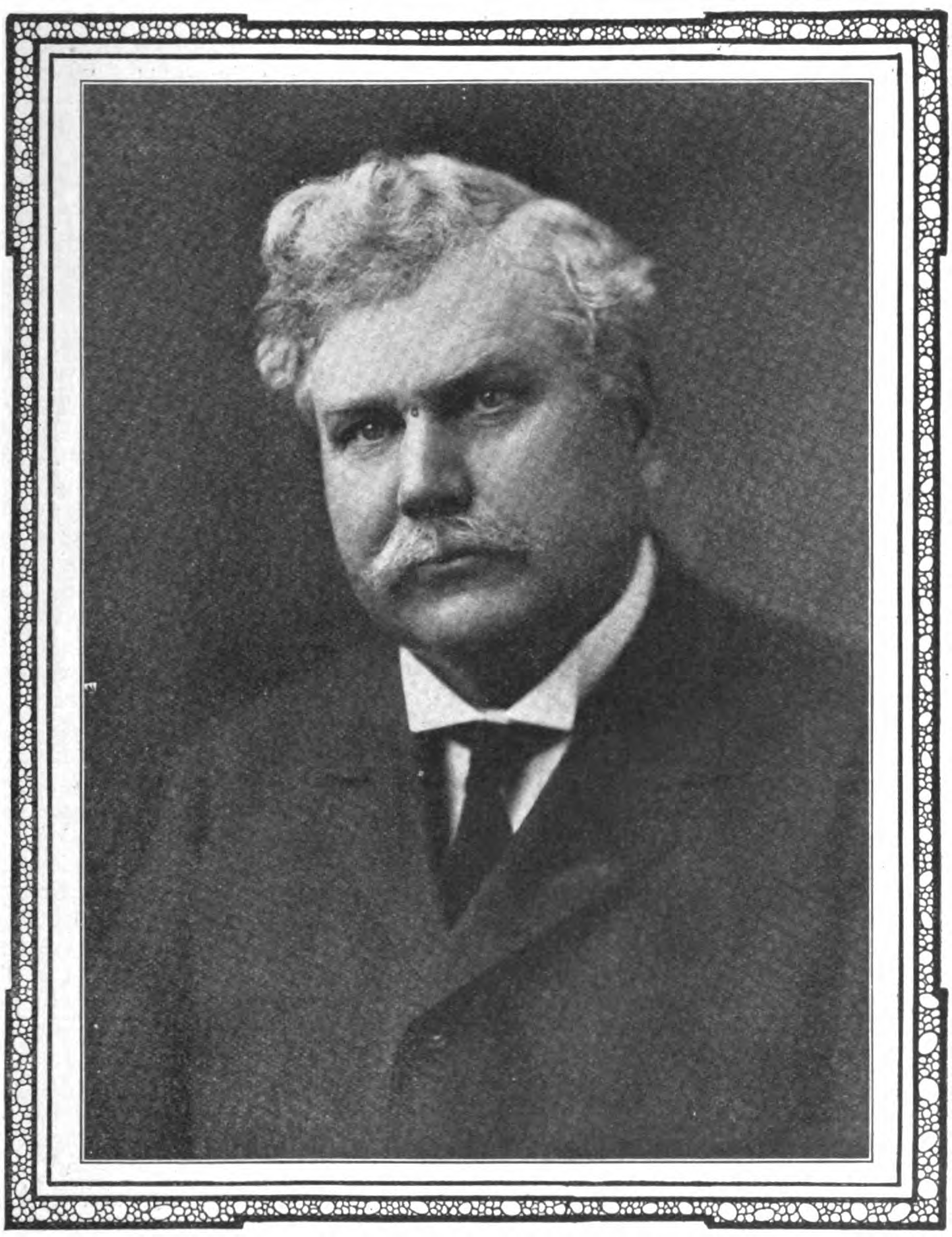
Hill as depicted in Sunset, The Pacific Monthly, in 1913

After leaving the employ of his father-in-law J.J. Hill in 1900, Sam Hill undertook a variety of business ventures and other projects, with varied results.

=== Utility companies ===
His Seattle Gas and Electric Company was continually in hard-fought rivalry with other utilities, most notably head-on competition with the Citizens' Light and Power Company, whose leadership included several defectors from Hill's company. Ultimately, after a price war, Hill was able to sell the company's gas facilities to the consolidated Seattle Lighting Company in 1904 on favorable terms.

Other ventures into utilities was less successful: The Home Telephone Company of Portland pioneered rotary dial telephones in the region, but ultimately this independent telephone company lost out to the better-integrated Bell System. Its stockholders were wiped out, and its bondholders – Hill himself was the largest of these – ultimately received 70 cents on the dollar.

The Deep Water Coal and Iron Company in Alabama was another business failure. At the end of his life the shares in this last enterprise were worthless, due in part to the Great Depression.

=== Maryhill community ===
Starting in 1907, Sam Hill bought up most of what had been a small settlement called "Columbia" or "Columbus" near the Columbia River in Klickitat County, Washington, which he envisioned as a new community in the Inland Empire. He named the parcel Maryhill, after his wife and his daughter Mary – neither of whom ever actually lived there.

His original plan was to develop it as a farming community of Quakers, but Sam was the only known Quaker resident. Taken as a whole, his attempt to create the Maryhill community was one of Hill's least successful investments: He spent at least US$600,000 that never paid back in any significant measure.

=== Golf course and restaurant ===
A more modest, but successful undertaking was a golf course and a large, simple restaurant at Semiahmoo, just north of the U.S.–Canada border and Hill's Peace Arch. The restaurant was basically an early fast food establishment. During Prohibition the restaurant benefited from being on the Canadian side of the border, where alcoholic beverages could be served legally.

== Advocate for paved roads ==
Good roads are more than my hobby, they are my religion.

— Sam Hill

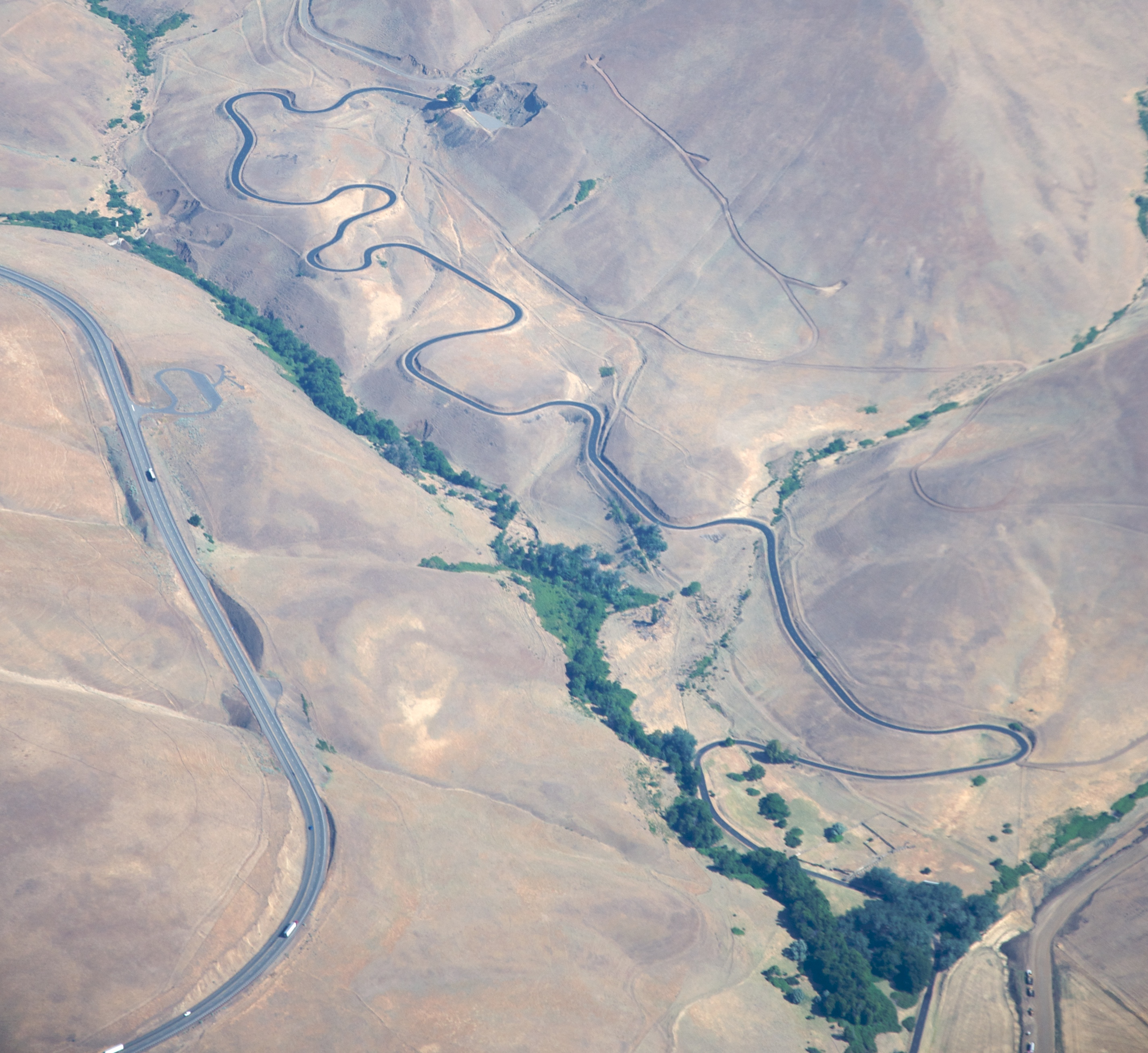
Maryhill Loops Road viewed from aloft

Sam Hill devoted much attention to advocating construction of modern roads in Washington and Oregon. In September 1899 Hill created the Washington State Good Roads Association which persuaded the Washington State Legislature to create the Washington State Department of Transportation in 1905. He also advocated the use of convict labor to build roads.

Hill's land around Maryhill proved useful for his advocacy. From 1909–1913 he laid 10 miles (16 km) of asphalt-paved Macadam road at his own expense (US$100,000). It was the first such road in the Pacific Northwest and Hill experimented over its length with seven different paving techniques. The part of this road that remains – now called the Maryhill Loops Road – is normally open to pedestrians and bicyclists and closed to motor traffic. It is the site of annual longboard races and downhill bicycle events.

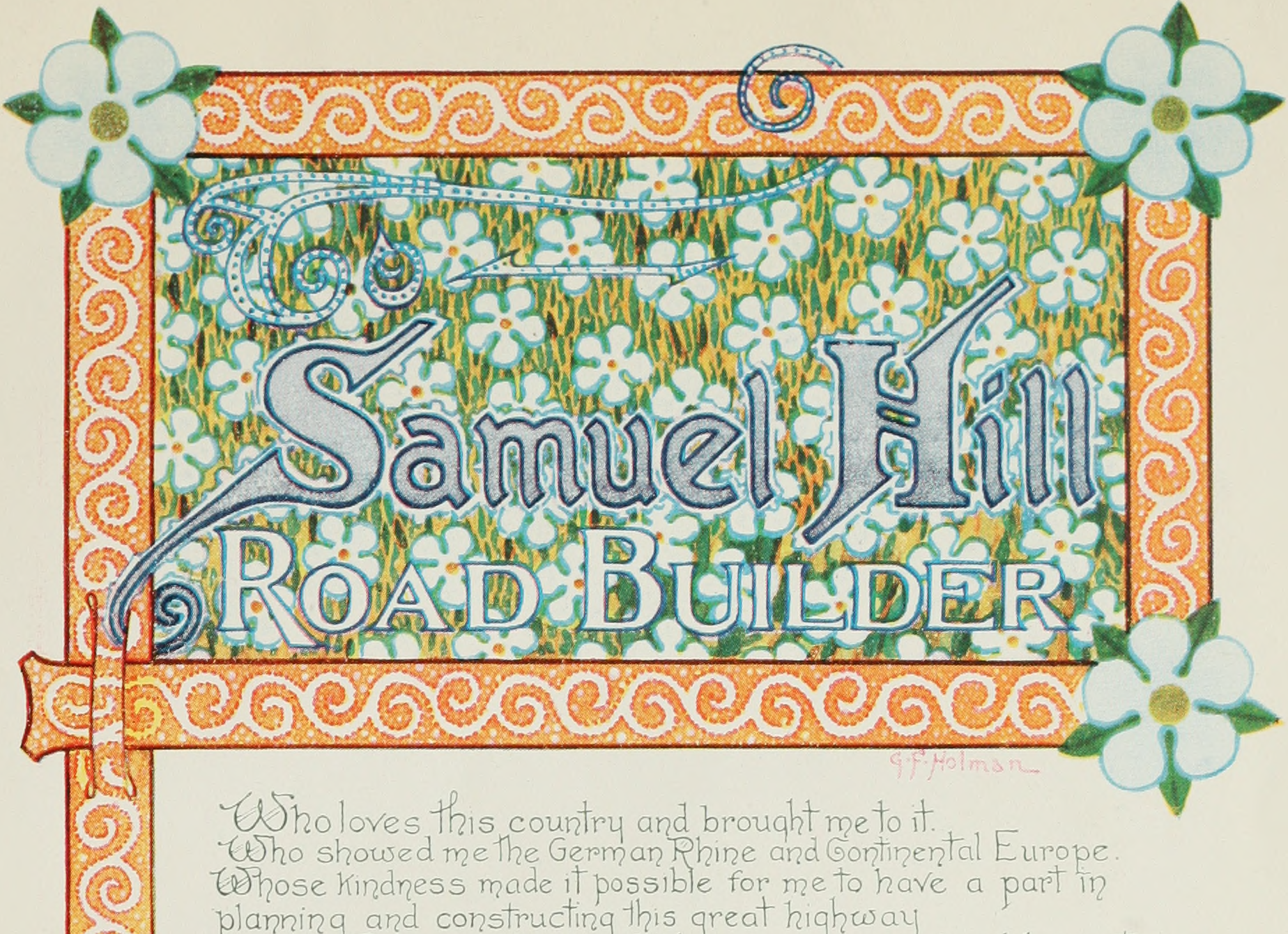
Art from the 1916 book, Columbia: America's Great Highway

In 1907, Hill persuaded the University of Washington to establish the United States' first chair in highway engineering. He could not persuade the State of Washington to build a highway on the north bank of the Columbia River, but in 1913 Oregon governor Oswald West and the Oregon Legislative Assembly visited Maryhill to inspect his experimental prototype road. Subsequently, the State of Oregon built the scenic Columbia River Highway, which linked coastal Astoria, Oregon and The Dalles, Oregon. In recognition of his influence, a plaque honoring him was placed along Historic Columbia River Highway, at Chanticleer Point, Oregon.

Also in honor of his advocacy for good roads the bridge near Maryhill for U.S. Route 97 across the Columbia River was named the Sam Hill Memorial Bridge.

Sam Hill was also a strong advocate of better roads for Japan, and of Japanese-American friendship, which earned him the Third Class Order of the Sacred Treasure in 1922.

== Monuments and institutions ==
Sam Hill built two notable monuments and an art museum, and purchased the private Minneapolis Athenaeum and donated it to the city.

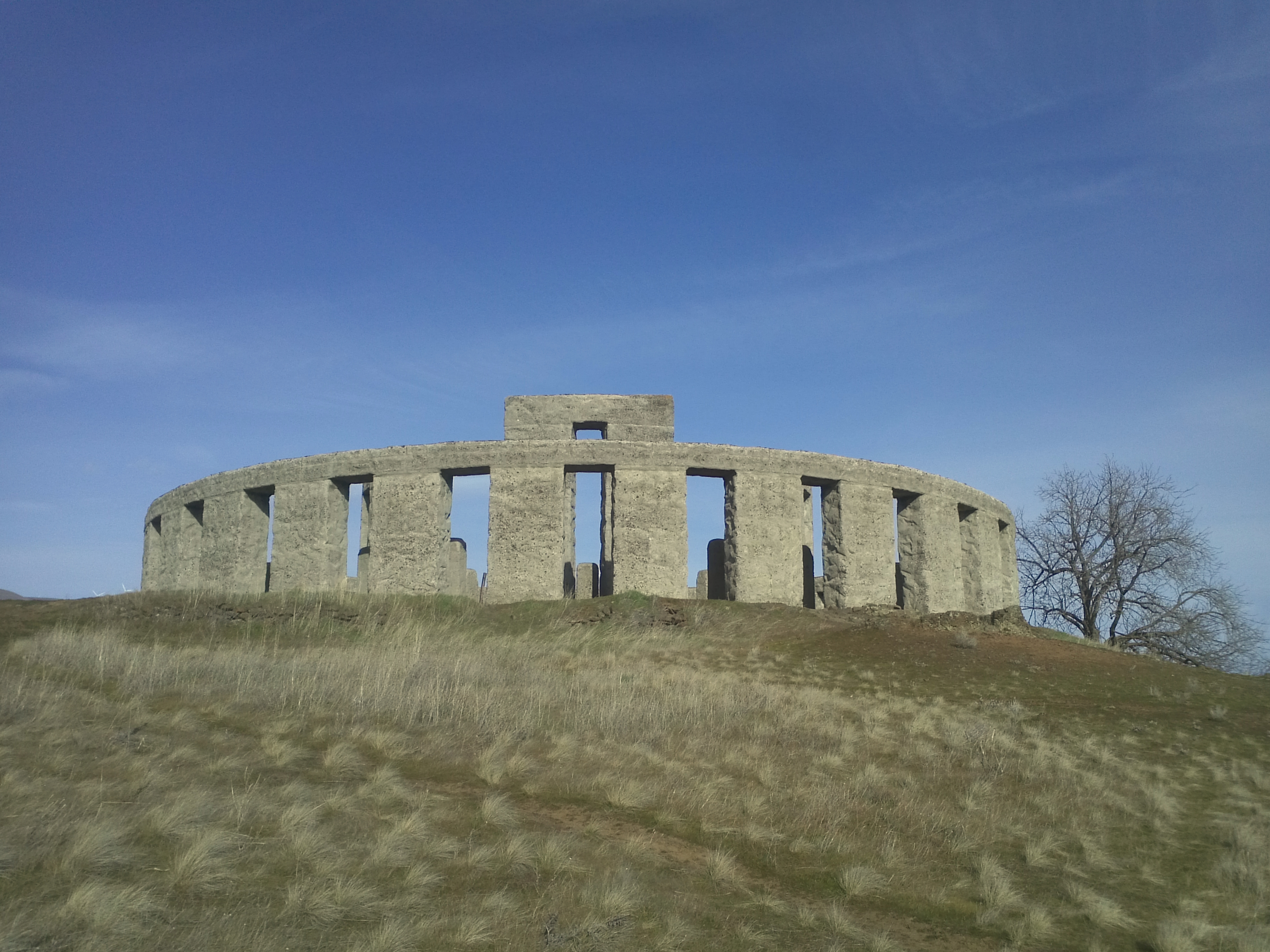
The Maryhill Stonehenge replica World War I memorial

=== Maryhill Stonehenge ===
The Stonehenge replica at Maryhill commemorates the dead of World War I. It was built by Hill as a reminder that in the present day people are still being sacrificed to the god of war.

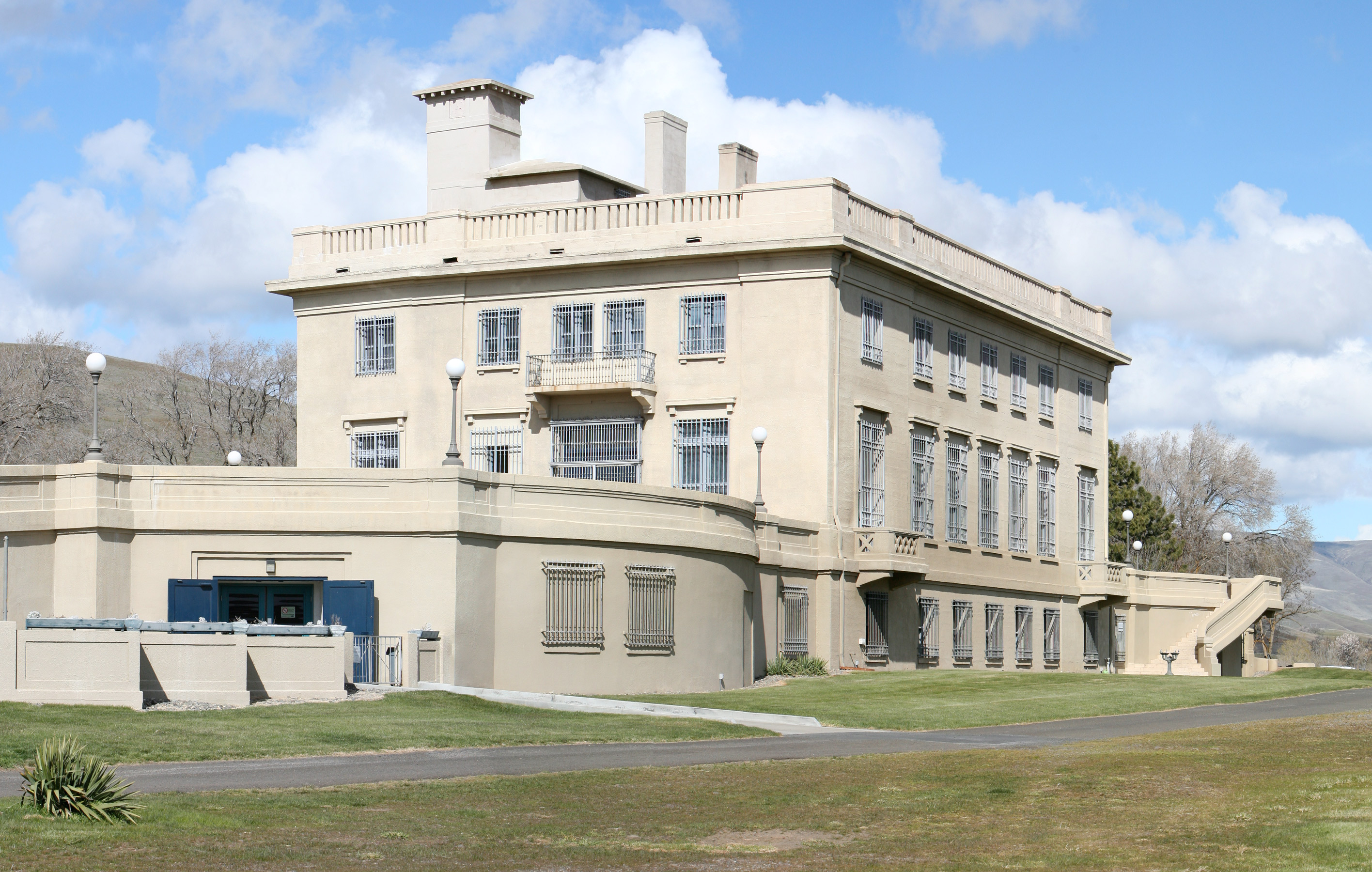
The Maryhill Museum of Art

=== Maryhill Art Museum ===
Hill began to build a mansion at Maryhill, but the project was not completed in his lifetime due to a combination of financial reversals and his frustration at the State of Washington's failure to build a road on the north bank of the Columbia or to otherwise make the area readily accessible.

At the urging of his friend Loie Fuller, Sam decided to re-purpose the building as an art museum. The museum was dedicated by Queen Marie of Romania in 1926, but did not open to the public until 1940, nine years after Hill's death.

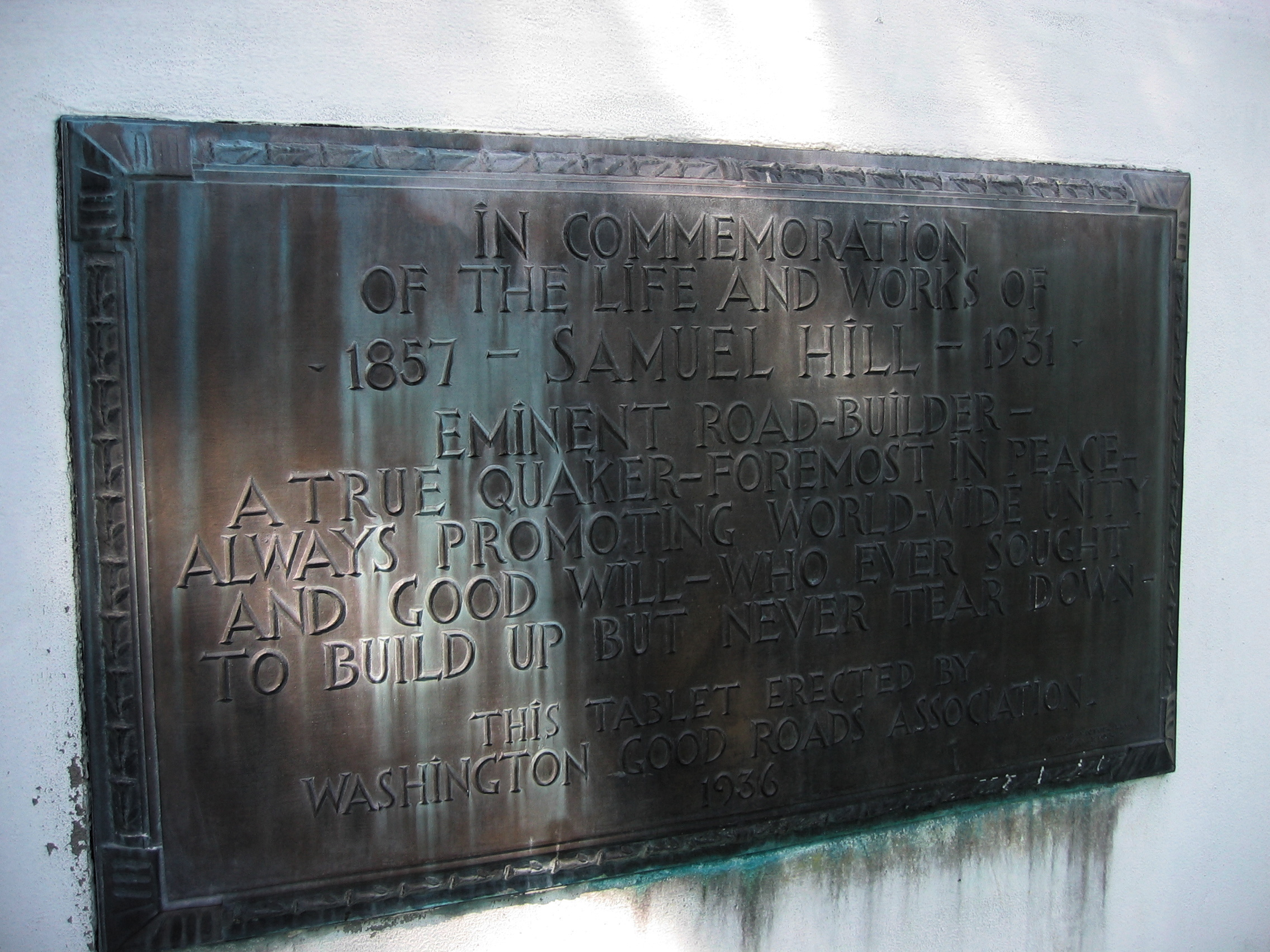
A plaque honoring Samuel Hill, mounted on the Peace Arch

=== Peace Arch ===
The Peace Arch—where today's Interstate 5 highway crosses the U.S.–Canada border between Blaine, Washington, and Surrey, British Columbia—celebrates peaceful relations and the open border between the two nations.

=== Minneapolis Athenaeum ===
Hill served for a time as vice president of the Minneapolis Athenaeum, a private subscription library, and recruited George Putnam as its librarian in 1884. In 1907, he donated a collection of Chinese prints. He eventually acquired all the stock of the Athenaeum Company, which he donated to the public Minneapolis Foundation.

== Politics ==
Hill identified as a Republican and at times was active in the party. He disliked Teddy Roosevelt's trust-busting and thought that William Howard Taft was such a disastrous choice for president that he openly endorsed William Jennings Bryan in 1908, and Woodrow Wilson in 1912 and 1916. He eventually came to oppose Wilson some time after the end of World War I.

He was generally ill-disposed toward labor unions.

== Personal and family life ==
=== Marriage ===
Sam Hill married Marie Francis Hill (also known as Mamie Hill and, after their marriage, as Mary Hill Hill), a daughter of James J. Hill, on September 6, 1888. A generous wedding gift from her father placed them immediately into the ranks of the wealthy.

Their two children were Mary Mendenhall Hill (born July 3, 1889) and James Nathan Branson Hill (born August 23, 1893). Mary was Catholic and Sam agreed that their children would be raised Catholic. Sam was a Quaker, but over the next decade or two he maintained excellent relations with various Catholic clergy – even some close friendships.

Their marriage was never a love-match and by 1900 when Sam had decided to settle in Seattle, the marriage was coming apart. Mary left Sam in Seattle and moved back to the Minneapolis-St. Paul area with their children; she eventually moved to Washington, D.C.

Mary never returned to Seattle, but up to 1907 Sam continued to visit her in the Midwest or back East at least twice a year. He even bought an estate at Stockbridge, Massachusetts, where Sam hoped he and Mary would occasionally stay together, but their relationship continued to grow cold. Because she was Catholic, a divorce was out of the question for Mary; the possibility might not even have been discussed.

Mary increasingly withdrew from the world: By 1921 she was described by the St. Paul Pioneer Press as "virtually an invalid", although she lived until 1947.

As for their children, daughter Mary suffered all of her life from emotional and mental problems, and spent much of her life institutionalized. Sam and Mary's son James N.B. Hill lived the life of a wealthy man, but never impressed his father's biographer as having made any particular mark on the world.

=== Other children ===
It is not clear whether Sam had been unfaithful to his wife before she abandoned him but he certainly did not remain faithful afterward. He had at least three children by other women whom he provided for by setting up insurance policies, trusts in their names, etc.

One of these children is identified by Hill biographer John E. Tuhy, writing in 1983, only as a "son who lives in British Columbia".

Another was Elizabeth Ehrens (born December 27, 1914). Her mother was Annie Laurie Whelan, Sam's secretary at the Home Telephone Company. Elizabeth was legitimized by her mother's marriage of convenience to a German-Swiss man named Henry Ehrens who soon returned permanently to Europe. The couple were granted a divorce in 1918.

Sam Hill's last child was Sam Bettle Hill (born August 1928, died 1997) son by Mona Bell, a flamboyant bareback rider turned reporter; who allegedly appeared in Buffalo Bill Cody's Wild West Show.

The year before their child was born, Sam bought Bell 35 acres (140,000 m^{2}) on the Columbia River and built her a 22-room house which was eventually demolished for the construction of the Bonneville Dam. Sam arranged a marriage of convenience for Mona Bell to his cousin Edgar Hill, again allowing his child to be raised as legitimate, and this time as a legal member of his natural father's family.

=== Character and mental health ===
Hill's biographer John E. Tuhy (Sam Hill: The Prince of Castle Nowhere, 1983) occasionally questions aspects of Hill's own account of his life and doings or finds contradictions in anecdotes told at various times. He believes that Hill was at least somewhat manic-depressive and sees strong signs of a manic, or at least hypomanic, state in his many, often abortive projects in the 1920s and possibly of paranoia in his belief that the Soviet Union was out to harm him.

Tuhy raises the possibility that some early aspect of this "instability" might have played a part in Sam's parting of ways in business from James J. Hill. A 1901 letter from Sam to James suggests that Sam believed his father-in-law was at least in some degree disappointed in him: He writes about having "often been an embarrassment to you", even though the historical record shows no indication of any significant business errors on Sam's part during his association with his father-in-law.

== Death and burial monument ==
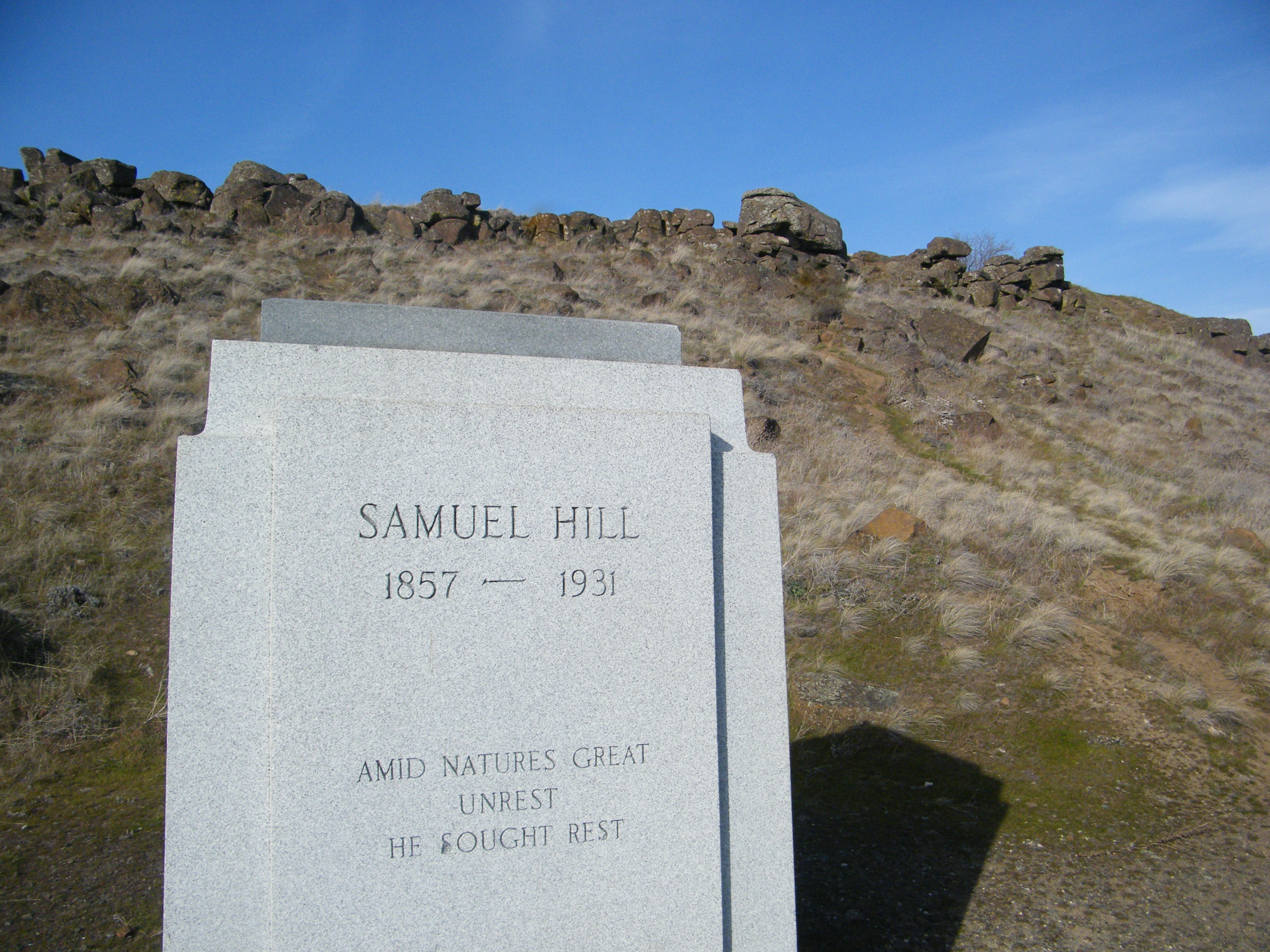
Tombstone of Samuel Hill near Maryhill Stonehenge

In 1931 Hill went to Salem to speak to the Oregon State Legislature regarding the need to regulate trucks, in order to protect the condition of highways; he intended to follow this with a similar address to the Washington State Legislature. He became acutely ill on the way and died from natural causes aged 74 years. The recorded cause of death is "an abscess of the lesser peritoneal cavity which had ruptured into the stomach, producing fatal / terminal hemorrhages."

Hill chose a ledge below his Stonehenge replica for his burial site, and designed his own monument. His original monument did not last, and has since been replaced.
