= Centerville, Washington =

- Census-designated place
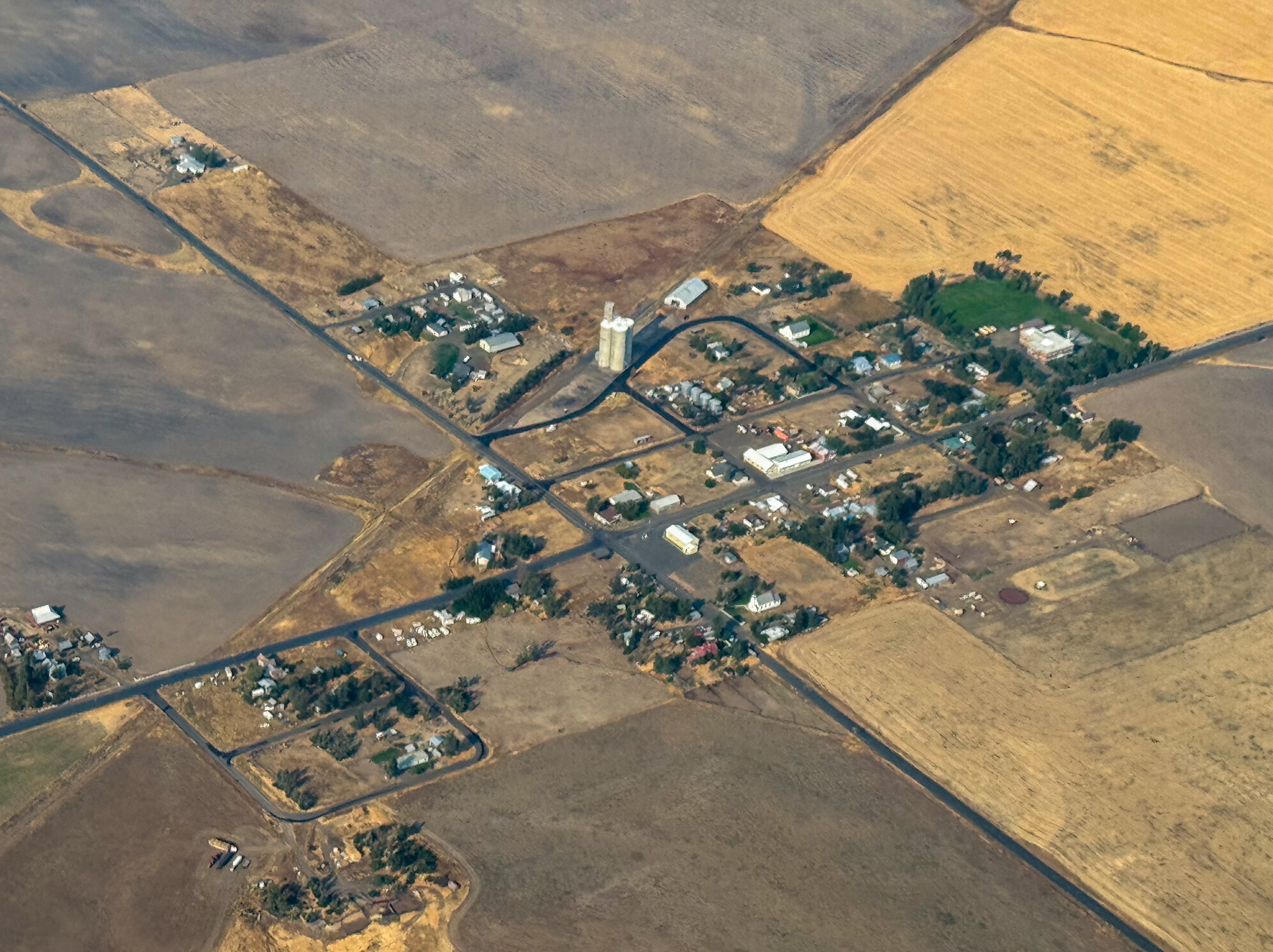
- View of the town in 2025

- Location of Centerville in Klickitat County, Washington
- Coordinates: 45°44′56″N 120°54′36″W
- Country: United States
- State: Washington
- County: Klickitat

Area
  - Total: 3.32 sq mi (8.59 km^{2})
  - Land: 3.32 sq mi (8.59 km^{2})
  - Water: 0 sq mi (0.0 km^{2})
- Elevation: 1,598 ft (487 m)

Population (2020)
  - Total: 94
  - Density: 28/sq mi (11/km^{2})
- Time zone: UTC-8 (Pacific (PST))
  - Summer (DST): UTC-7 (PDT)
- ZIP code: 98613
- Area code: 509
- FIPS code: 53-11090
- GNIS feature ID: 2408003

Centerville is an unincorporated community and census-designated place (CDP) in Klickitat County, Washington, United States. Settled in 1877 by Albert J. Brown, the population was 94 at the 2020 census.

== Geography ==
Centerville is located in south-central Klickitat County 4 miles (6 km) west of U.S. Route 97, 8 miles (13 km) southwest of Goldendale, and 11 miles (18 km) northwest of the Columbia River at Maryhill.

According to the United States Census Bureau, the Centerville CDP has a total area of 3.3 square miles (8.6 km^{2}), all of it land.

=== Climate ===
This region experiences warm and dry summers, with average monthly temperatures above 90.6 °F. According to the Köppen Climate Classification system, Centerville has a warm-summer Mediterranean climate, abbreviated "Csb" on climate maps.

== Demographics ==
Historical population
Census	Pop.	Note	%±
2000	120		—
2010	112		−6.7%
2020	94		−16.1%
U.S. Decennial Census; 1990 2000 2010 2020

Centerville first appeared as a census designated place in the 2000 U.S. census.

=== Racial and ethnic composition ===
Centerville CDP, Washington – Racial and ethnic composition Note: the US Census treats Hispanic/Latino as an ethnic category. This table excludes Latinos from the racial categories and assigns them to a separate category. Hispanics/Latinos may be of any race.
Race / Ethnicity (NH = Non-Hispanic)	Pop 2000	Pop 2010	Pop 2020	% 2000	% 2010	% 2020
White alone (NH)	113	100	79	94.17%	89.29%	84.04%
Black or African American alone (NH)	0	0	0	0.00%	0.00%	0.00%
Native American or Alaska Native alone (NH)	0	6	5	0.00%	5.36%	5.32%
Asian alone (NH)	0	0	0	0.00%	0.00%	0.00%
Native Hawaiian or Pacific Islander alone (NH)	0	0	0	0.00%	0.00%	0.00%
Other race alone (NH)	0	0	0	0.00%	0.00%	0.00%
Mixed race or Multiracial (NH)	2	4	6	1.67%	3.57%	6.38%
Hispanic or Latino (any race)	5	2	4	4.17%	1.79%	4.26%
Total	120	112	94	100.00%	100.00%	100.00%

=== 2000 census ===
As of the census of 2000, there were 120 people, 47 households, and 36 families residing in the CDP. The population density was 30.2 people per square mile (11.7/km^{2}). There were 49 housing units at an average density of 12.4/sq mi (4.8/km^{2}). The racial makeup of the CDP was 96.67% White, 0.83% Native American, 0.83% from other races, and 1.67% from two or more races. Hispanic or Latino of any race were 4.17% of the population.

There were 47 households, out of which 21.3% had children under the age of 18 living with them, 70.2% were married couples living together, 8.5% had a female householder with no husband present, and 21.3% were non-families. 17.0% of all households were made up of individuals, and 2.1% had someone living alone who was 65 years of age or older. The average household size was 2.55 and the average family size was 2.81.

In the CDP, the population was spread out, with 20.8% under the age of 18, 5.8% from 18 to 24, 30.8% from 25 to 44, 30.8% from 45 to 64, and 11.7% who were 65 years of age or older. The median age was 42 years. For every 100 females, there were 103.4 males. For every 100 females age 18 and over, there were 97.9 males.

The median income for a household in the CDP was $31,250, and the median income for a family was $38,750. Males had a median income of $18,750 versus $20,417 for females. The per capita income for the CDP was $14,915. There were 6.7% of families and 18.3% of the population living below the poverty line, including 48.0% of under eighteens and none of those over 64.
