= Maryhill Loops Road =

Road in Washington state, U.S.

Coordinates: 45°43′12″N 120°48′00″W

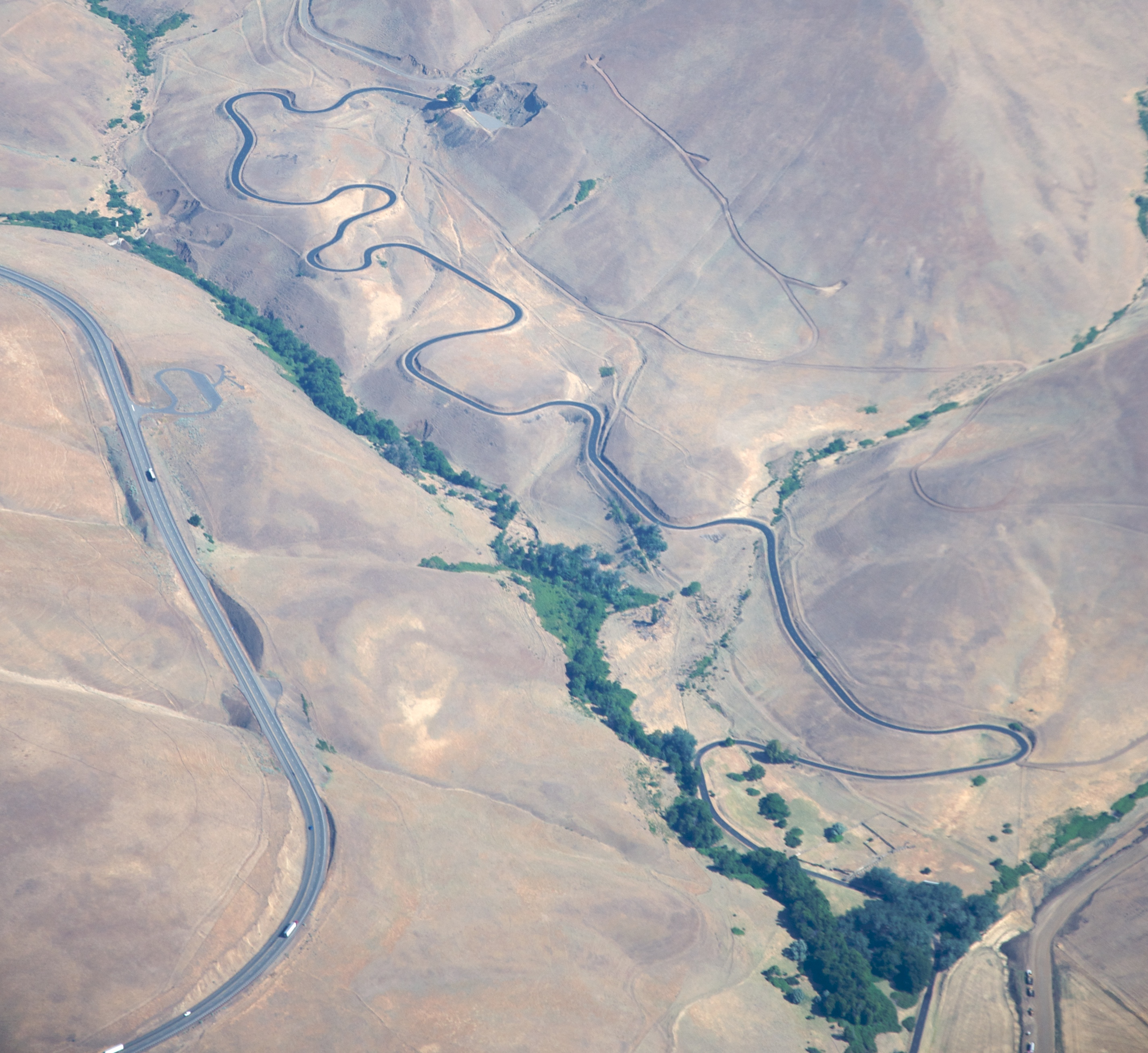
- Maintained by: Maryhill Museum of Art

The Maryhill Loops Road was an experimental road in south central Washington, United States, built by Good Roads promoter Samuel Hill with the help of engineer and landscape architect Samuel C. Lancaster. Laid in 1911 as the first asphalt road in the state, it achieved low grades with horseshoe curves. It was bypassed by the present, straighter U.S. Route 97 after World War II.

The road climbs the Columbia Hills from the Columbia River and Spokane, Portland and Seattle Railway to Hill's planned Quaker utopian community at Maryhill, Washington.

The design became the model for the Figure-Eight Loops on the Historic Columbia River Highway in Oregon, designed by Lancaster several years later.

The road is now owned by the Maryhill Museum of Art. Except when rented, it is open to pedestrians and bicycles, but closed to motor vehicle traffic. The Maryhill Museum of Art rents use of the road for private events by automobile, motorcycle, bicycling, and longboarding clubs. The yearly International Downhill Federation World Cup Series downhill longboarding and street luge event is held there.
