= Klickitat County, Washington =

County in Washington, United States

- County
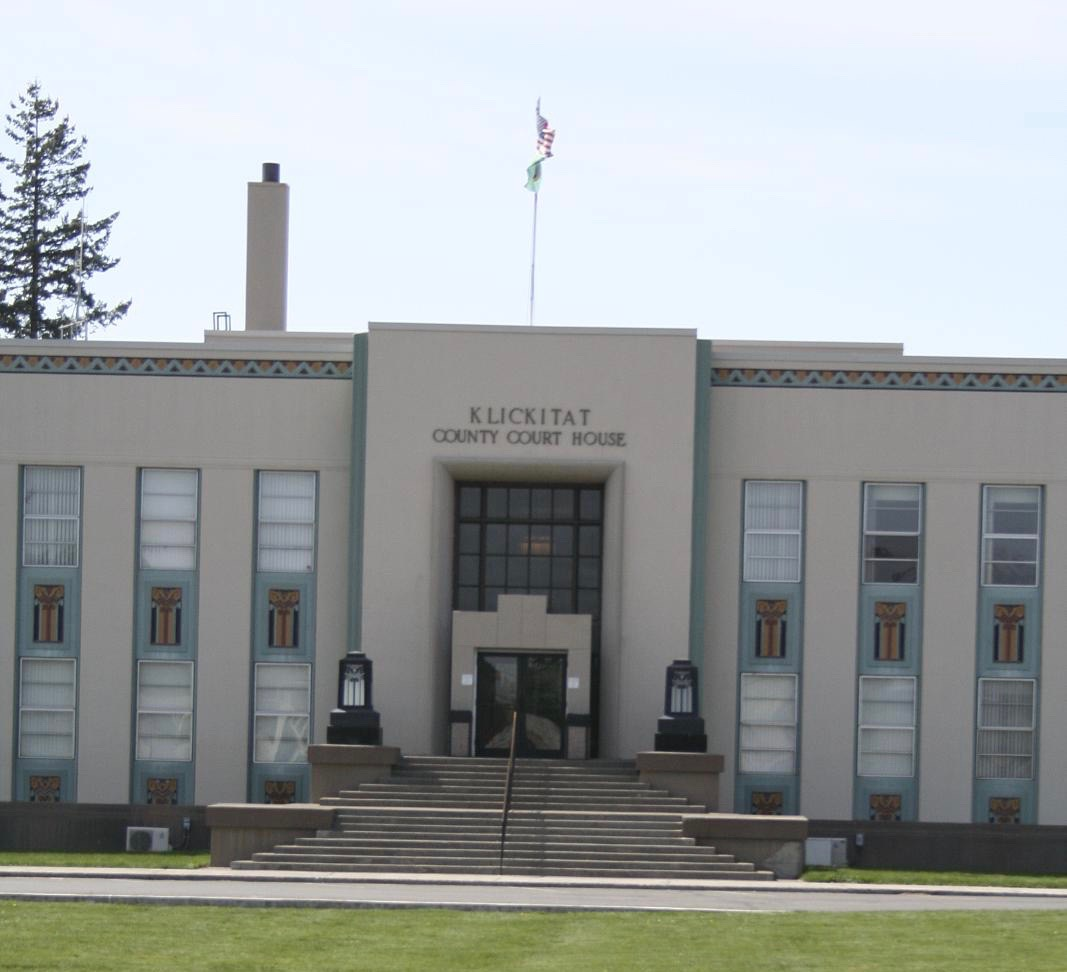
- Klickitat County Courthouse

- Location within the U.S. state of Washington
- Coordinates: 45°52′N 120°47′W
- Country: United States
- State: Washington
- Founded: December 20, 1859
- Named for: Klickitat Tribe
- Seat: Goldendale
- Largest city: Goldendale

Area
  - Total: 1,904 sq mi (4,930 km^{2})
  - Land: 1,871 sq mi (4,850 km^{2})
  - Water: 33 sq mi (85 km^{2}) 1.7%

Population (2020)
  - Total: 22,735
  - Estimate (2025): 24,331 ▲
  - Density: 11.6/sq mi (4.5/km^{2})
- Time zone: UTC−8 (Pacific)
  - Summer (DST): UTC−7 (PDT)
- Congressional district: 4th
- Website: www.klickitatcounty.gov

Klickitat County is a county located in the U.S. state of Washington. As of the 2020 census, its population was 22,735. The county seat and largest city is Goldendale. The county is named after the Klickitat tribe and contains part of the Yakama Indian Reservation.

== History ==
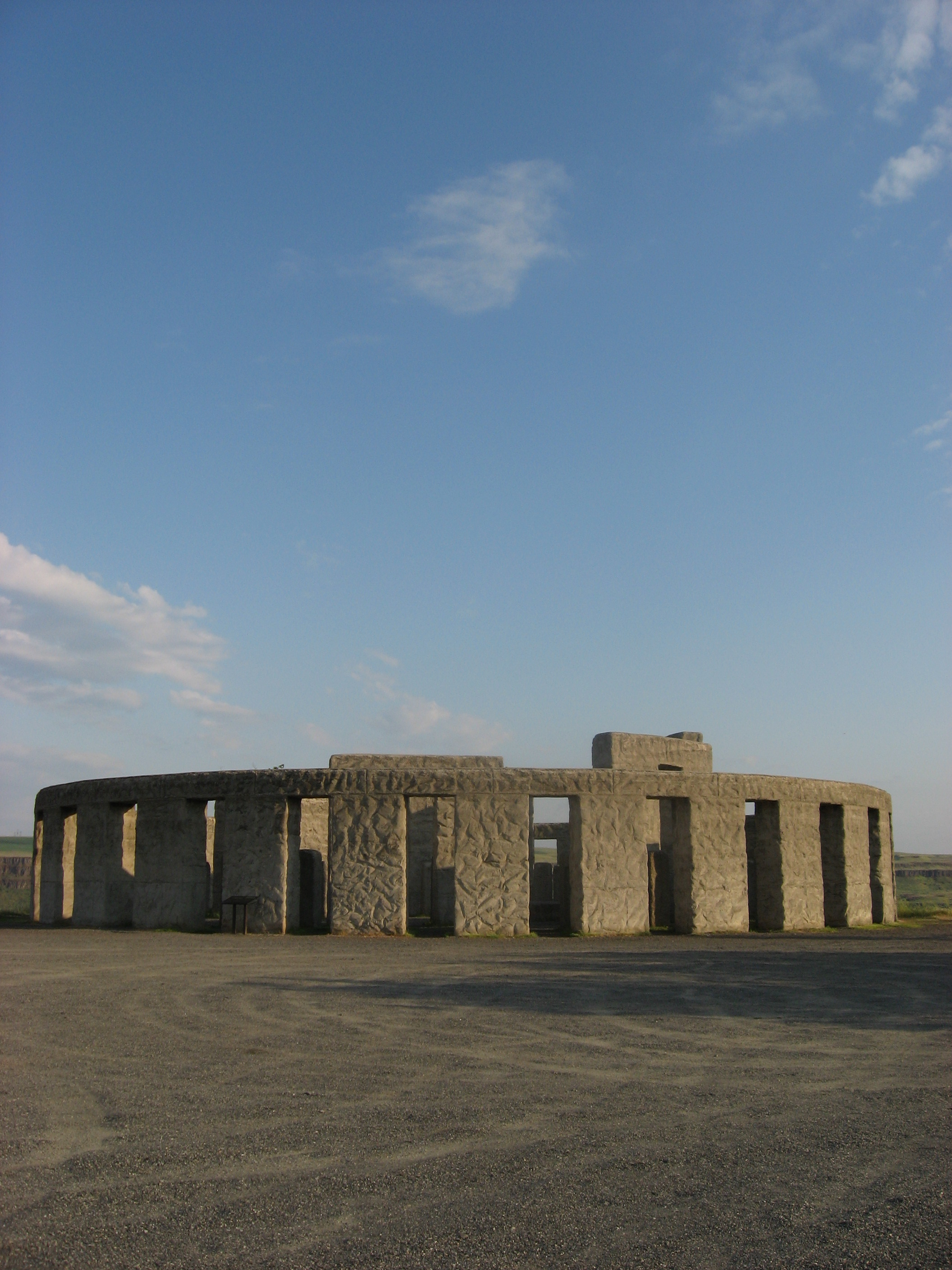
A replica of Stonehenge was built by Samuel Hill as a monument to local men killed in World War I called Maryhill Stonehenge.

Klickitat County was created out of Walla Walla County on December 20, 1859. Samuel Hill was an early promoter of the area, promoting better roads and building local landmarks such as a war-memorial replica of Stonehenge (Maryhill Stonehenge) and a mansion that would become the Maryhill Museum of Art. The Sam Hill Memorial Bridge across the Columbia River is named after him.

== Geography ==
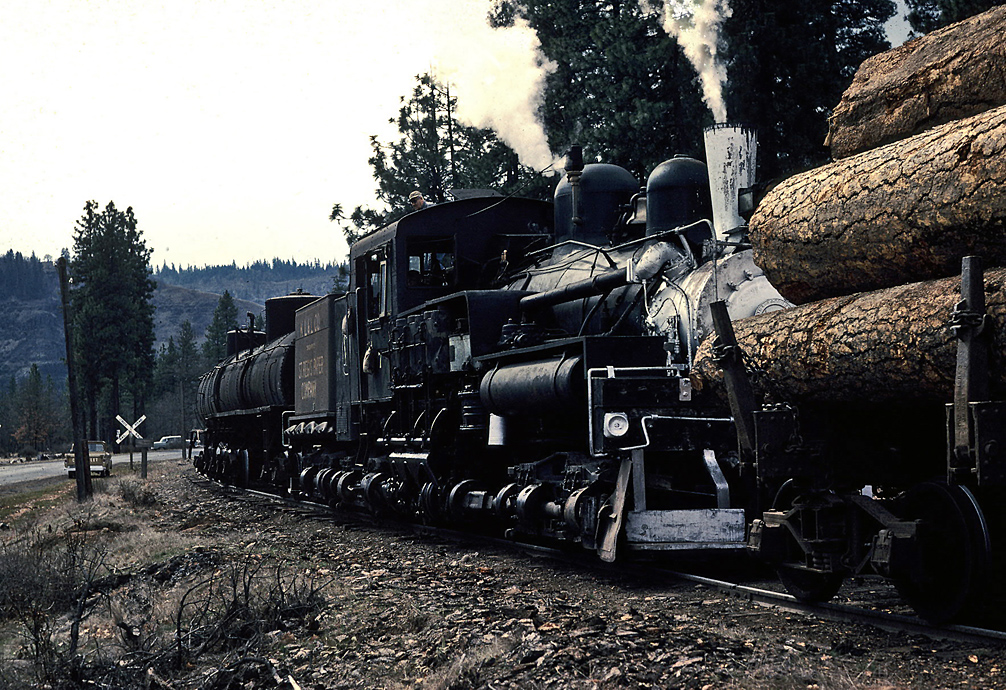
Klickitat Log and Lumber train switching, 1964

According to the United States Census Bureau, the county has a total area of 1,904 square miles (4,930 km^{2}), of which 33 square miles (85 km^{2}) (1.7%) are covered by water.

=== Geographic features ===
- Cascade Mountains
- Columbia River

=== Major highways ===
- U.S. Route 97
- State Route 14
- State Route 141
- State Route 142

=== Adjacent counties ===
- Yakima County - north
- Benton County - northeast
- Morrow County, Oregon - southeast
- Gilliam County, Oregon - southeast
- Sherman County, Oregon - south
- Hood River County, Oregon - southwest
- Wasco County, Oregon - southwest
- Skamania County - west

=== National protected areas ===
- Conboy Lake National Wildlife Refuge
- Gifford Pinchot National Forest (part)

== Demographics ==
Historical population
Census	Pop.	Note	%±
1860	230		—
1870	329		43.0%
1880	4,055		1,132.5%
1890	5,167		27.4%
1900	6,407		24.0%
1910	10,180		58.9%
1920	9,268		−9.0%
1930	9,825		6.0%
1940	11,357		15.6%
1950	12,049		6.1%
1960	13,455		11.7%
1970	12,138		−9.8%
1980	15,822		30.4%
1990	16,616		5.0%
2000	19,161		15.3%
2010	20,318		6.0%
2020	22,735		11.9%
2025 (est.)	24,331	▲	7.0%
U.S. Decennial Census; 1790–1960 1900–1990; 1990–2000 2010–2020

=== 2020 census ===
As of the 2020 census, the county had a population of 22,735. Of the residents, 19.5% were under the age of 18 and 23.7% were 65 years of age or older; the median age was 46.0 years. For every 100 females there were 104.9 males, and for every 100 females age 18 and over there were 104.6 males. 20.3% of residents lived in urban areas and 79.7% lived in rural areas.

4.6% of residents were under the age of 5.

The population density of the county was 12.1 people per square mile, which went up from 10.9 in 2010.

Klickitat County, Washington – Racial and ethnic composition Note: the US Census treats Hispanic/Latino as an ethnic category. This table excludes Latinos from the racial categories and assigns them to a separate category. Hispanics/Latinos may be of any race.
Race / Ethnicity (NH = Non-Hispanic)	Pop 2000	Pop 2010	Pop 2020	% 2000	% 2010	% 2020
White alone (NH)	16,329	17,022	17,731	85.22%	83.78%	77.99%
Black or African American alone (NH)	26	42	64	0.14%	0.21%	0.28%
Native American or Alaska Native alone (NH)	639	434	503	3.33%	2.14%	2.21%
Asian alone (NH)	136	122	135	0.71%	0.60%	0.59%
Pacific Islander alone (NH)	40	17	35	0.21%	0.08%	0.15%
Other race alone (NH)	48	15	113	0.25%	0.07%	0.50%
Mixed race or Multiracial (NH)	447	495	1,241	2.33%	2.44%	5.46%
Hispanic or Latino (any race)	1,496	2,171	2,913	7.81%	10.69%	12.81%
Total	19,161	20,318	22,735	100.00%	100.00%	100.00%

The racial makeup of the county was 80.4% White, 0.3% Black or African American, 2.4% American Indian and Alaska Native, 0.6% Asian, 6.9% from some other race, and 9.2% from two or more races. Hispanic or Latino residents of any race comprised 12.8% of the population.

There were 9,213 households in the county, of which 25.7% had children under the age of 18 living with them and 20.5% had a female householder with no spouse or partner present. About 26.2% of all households were made up of individuals and 12.2% had someone living alone who was 65 years of age or older.

There were 10,533 housing units, of which 12.5% were vacant. Among occupied housing units, 72.1% were owner-occupied and 27.9% were renter-occupied. The homeowner vacancy rate was 1.2% and the rental vacancy rate was 6.3%.

The median household income in the county was $59,583, and the per capita income was $34,529. About 13.0% of the population in the county were under the poverty line.

=== 2010 census ===
As of the 2010 census, 20,318 people, 8,327 households, and 5,626 families lived in the county. The population density was 10.9 inhabitants per square mile (4.2/km^{2}). The 9,786 housing units had an average density of 5.2 per square mile (2.0/km^{2}). The racial makeup of the county was 87.7% White, 2.4% American Indian, 0.6% Asian, 0.2% Black or African American, 5.7% from other races, and 3.3% from two or more races. Those of Hispanic or Latino origin made up 10.7% of the population. In terms of ancestry,

Of the 8,327 households, 27.6% had children under 18 living with them, 54.5% were married couples living together, 8.5% had a female householder with no husband present, 32.4% were not families, and 26.4% of all households were made up of individuals. The average household size was 2.42 and the average family size was 2.88. The median age was 45.3 years.

The median income for a household in the county was $37,398 and for a family was $46,012. Males had a median income of $43,588 versus $31,114 for females. The per capita income for the county was $21,553. About 13.7% of families and 19.5% of the population were below the poverty line, including 33.9% of those under age 18 and 9.4% of those age 65 or over.

=== 2000 census ===
As of the 2000 census, 19,161 people, 7,473 households, and 5,305 families resided in the county. The population density was 10 people per square mile (3.9 people/km^{2}). The 8,633 housing units had an average density of 5 per square mile (1.9/km^{2}). The racial makeup of the county was 87.56% White, 0.27% Black or African American, 3.47% Native American, 0.73% Asian, 0.21% Pacific Islander, 5.02% from other races, and 2.75% from two or more races. About 7.81% of the population were Hispanics or Latinos of any race; 17.7% were of German, 14.0% United States or American, 11.1% English and 9.6% Irish ancestry. 90.3% spoke English and 7.8% Spanish as their first language.

Of the 7,473 households, 32.3% had children under 18 living with them, 57.7% were married couples living together, 9.1% had a female householder with no husband present, and 29.0% were not families. About 23.8% of all households were made up of individuals, and 9.0% had someone living alone who was 65 or older. The average household size was 2.54 and the average family size was 2.99.

The age distribution was 27.1% under 18, 6.5% from 18 to 24, 25.7% from 25 to 44, 27.0% from 45 to 64, and 13.8% who were 65 or older. The median age was 40 years. For every 100 females, there were 99.5 males. For every 100 females 18 and over, there were 98.8 males.

The median income for a household in the county was $34,267, and for a family was $40,414. Males had a median income of $36,067 versus $21,922 for females. The per capita income for the county was $16,502. About 12.6% of families and 17.0% of the population were below the poverty line, including 22.5% of those under 18 and 15.10% of those 65 or over.

== Communities ==
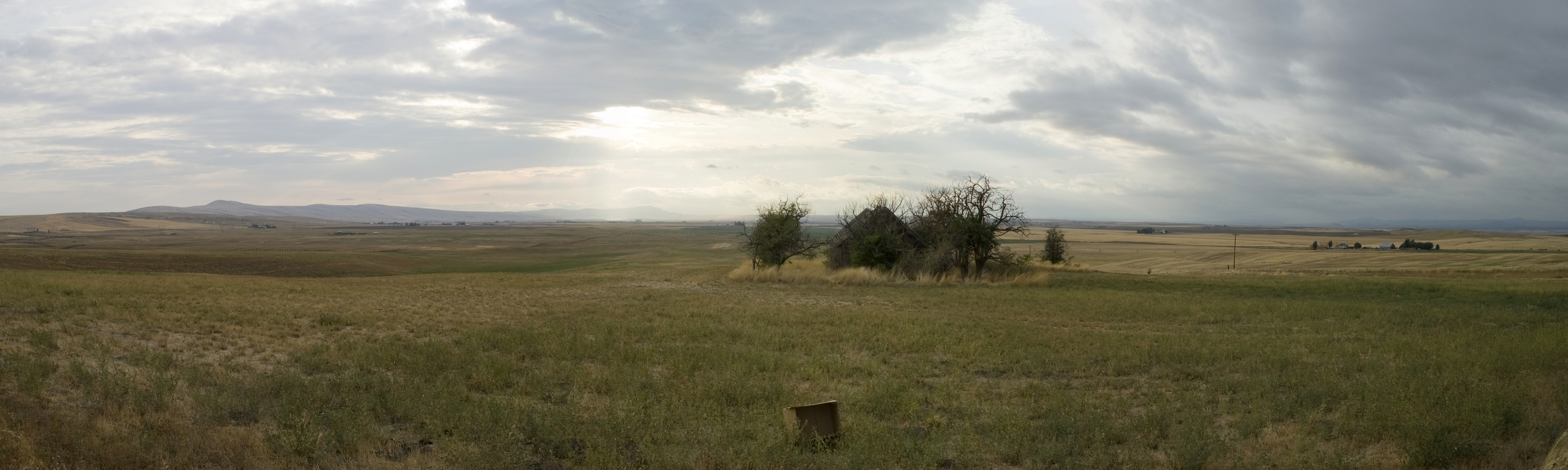
The Klickitat Valley

=== Cities ===
- Bingen
- Goldendale (county seat)
- White Salmon

=== Census-designated places ===
- Bickleton
- Centerville
- Dallesport
- Glenwood
- Klickitat
- Lyle
- Maryhill
- Roosevelt
- Trout Lake
- Wishram

=== Unincorporated communities ===
- Appleton
- Cleveland
- Firwood
- Husum
- Wahkiacus

== Government and politics ==
Klickitat is located in Washington's 4th congressional district, which has a Cook Partisan Voting Index of R+11 and has been represented by Republican Dan Newhouse since 2015. In state government, the county is part of the 14th district, represented by Gina Mosbrucker and Chris Corry in the Washington House of Representatives and Curtis King in the Washington State Senate.

In presidential elections, Klickitat County has trended Republican in recent years. In 1988 Michael Dukakis narrowly won the county with 49.15% of the vote. Richard Nixon (1960, 1972), Ronald Reagan, Bill Clinton, and George W. Bush all won the county twice. In 2008 Democrat Barack Obama won Klickitat County over Republican John McCain by only 21 votes or percentage wise 48.85% to 48.64%. In 2012 Republican candidate Mitt Romney won the county by a greater margin than in the previous election, with 51.74% of the vote compared to President Obama's 44.75%, and Donald Trump doubled Romney's margin in 2016.

United States presidential election results for Klickitat County, Washington
Year	Republican		Democratic		Third party(ies)	
Year	No.	%	No.	%	No.	%
1892	616	47.02%	279	21.30%	415	31.68%
1896	876	54.92%	708	44.39%	11	0.69%
1900	906	61.01%	495	33.33%	84	5.66%
1904	1,370	70.65%	362	18.67%	207	10.68%
1908	1,245	61.12%	570	27.98%	222	10.90%
1912	1,163	33.62%	1,028	29.72%	1,268	36.66%
1916	1,570	48.17%	1,478	45.35%	211	6.47%
1920	1,649	59.38%	745	26.83%	383	13.79%
1924	1,482	52.72%	518	18.43%	811	28.85%
1928	1,936	65.43%	975	32.95%	48	1.62%
1932	1,335	36.65%	2,155	59.15%	153	4.20%
1936	1,190	30.53%	2,545	65.29%	163	4.18%
1940	2,139	44.62%	2,627	54.80%	28	0.58%
1944	1,980	47.98%	2,089	50.62%	58	1.41%
1948	1,951	45.88%	2,206	51.88%	95	2.23%
1952	2,845	56.78%	2,140	42.71%	26	0.52%
1956	2,794	51.94%	2,577	47.91%	8	0.15%
1960	2,836	50.69%	2,744	49.04%	15	0.27%
1964	1,850	32.60%	3,819	67.31%	5	0.09%
1968	2,355	45.52%	2,454	47.44%	364	7.04%
1972	3,061	54.20%	2,293	40.60%	294	5.21%
1976	2,573	44.99%	2,890	50.53%	256	4.48%
1980	3,113	49.54%	2,596	41.31%	575	9.15%
1984	3,910	57.87%	2,712	40.14%	135	2.00%
1988	2,920	47.98%	2,991	49.15%	175	2.88%
1992	2,085	30.44%	2,758	40.27%	2,006	29.29%
1996	2,662	37.75%	3,214	45.58%	1,176	16.68%
2000	4,557	55.85%	3,062	37.53%	540	6.62%
2004	5,016	54.30%	4,036	43.69%	185	2.00%
2008	4,944	48.64%	4,965	48.85%	255	2.51%
2012	5,316	51.74%	4,598	44.75%	360	3.50%
2016	5,789	52.28%	4,194	37.87%	1,091	9.85%
2020	7,237	53.37%	5,959	43.95%	364	2.68%
2024	7,178	52.75%	5,917	43.48%	512	3.76%

== See also ==
- National Register of Historic Places listings in Klickitat County, Washington
