= Firwood, Washington =

Unincorporated community in Washington, US

Firwood
- Unincorporated community
- Location within the state of Washington
- Coordinates: 45°55′52.44″N 120°54′46.25″W
- Country: United States
- State: Washington
- County: Klickitat
- Elevation: 2,336 ft (712 m)
- Time zone: UTC-8 (Pacific (PST))
  - Summer (DST): UTC-7 (PDT)
- FIPS code: 1510220

Firwood is an unincorporated community located in Klickitat County, Washington, United States. The community was settled in the early 1900s and was primarily an agricultural growing region. Sometimes called the "FG Territory", Firwood includes the former King Ranch area to the south. A post office was established at Firwood in 1903.
