= Mona Bell =

American rodeo rider and newspaper reporter

Mona Bell (13 January 1890 – 1 June 1981) was an American rodeo rider and newspaper reporter. She was the mistress of Pacific Northwest entrepreneur Sam Hill.

== Early life ==
Born in East Grand Forks, Minnesota, 13 January 1890, for one year Mona Bell attended the University of North Dakota across the state line in Grand Forks, North Dakota; she apparently stood out there for her skills at basketball.

She was a fine horse rider and good with a rifle and a pistol. She was a rodeo rider (she rode broncs in male disguise). By her own account, she appeared in Buffalo Bill Cody's Wild West Show (although her biographer John A. Harrison was unable to verify that).

She later became a reporter for various U.S. newspapers.

== Relationship with Sam Hill ==
In 1910, she met Sam Hill. He was a prominent entrepreneur 33 years her senior and was by then almost entirely estranged from his wife, although they never divorced.

She moved to Portland, Oregon, in 1920 to be near him, and in 1928, he bought her 35 acres (140,000 m^{2}) on the Columbia River and built her a 22 room house to which she added an elaborate garden. That same year, they had a son – Sam B. Hill – Sam Hill's youngest / last child. An arranged marriage to Hill's cousin Edgar Hill allowed Sam B. to be raised as legitimate and be legally a member of his father's family.

Hill was clearly the love of her life, although Bell had two brief marriages, one to a dentist and one to a doctor.

Sam Hill had other lovers, and before Sam B. was born had two other children outside his marriage by two different woman.

== Eminent domain battle and afterward ==
Three years after his death, the house Sam Hill gave Bell was demolished for the construction of the Bonneville Dam.

When the U.S. government seized Bell's property for the Bonneville Dam project in 1933, they offered her $25,000 ($607,000 today). She went to court, and in 1935, received $72,500 plus interest ($78,661 total, or $1.8 million today).

== Later career and adventures ==
In her 20s and 30s, Bell had a career as a reporter for various newspapers around the United States, including in San Francisco, where she became the first female crime reporter in the country.

Some time before 1926, she swam the frigid Strait of Juan de Fuca, an achievement possibly exceeding Gertrude Ederle's famed 1926 feat of swimming the English Channel. Note: This reference seems to confuse the accomplishment with that of 18-yr old Marilyn Bell of Toronto, Ontario, in 1956.

After winning the eminent domain case, Bell and 7 year-old Sam B. made a two-year round-the-world voyage that included six months in Africa. She then moved back to Minnesota where she raised her son.

In 1953, Bell moved from Minnesota to Riverside, California. Like her earlier home on the Columbia, she was renowned in Minnesota and Riverside for her elaborate gardens.

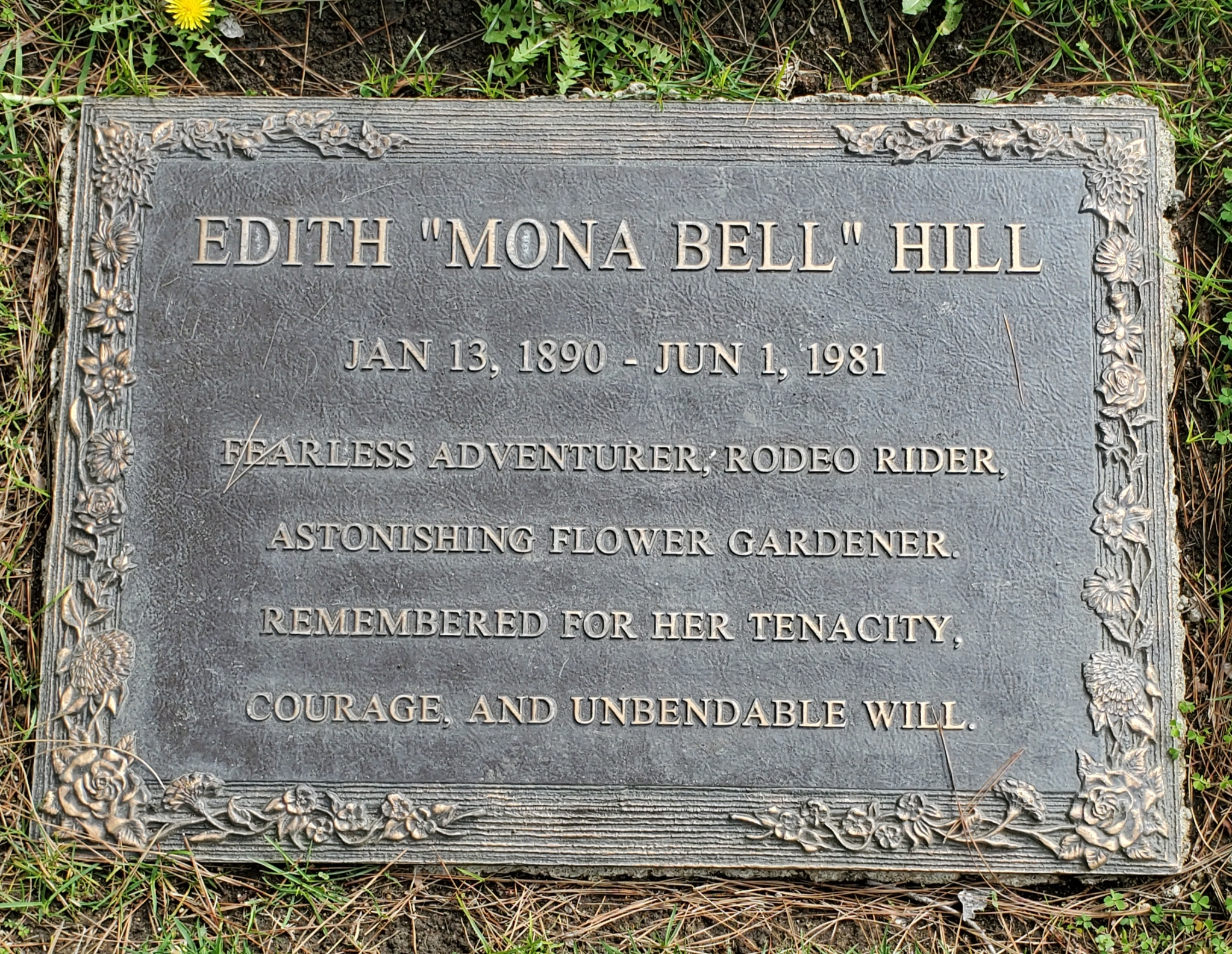
Mona Bell's gravestone at Forest Lawn Hollywood Hills

Bell died in 1981 at age 91. Bell is buried at Forest Lawn Hollywood Hills.
