= Sam Hill Memorial Bridge =

Bridge between Oregon and Washington, U.S.

Biggs Rapids Bridge
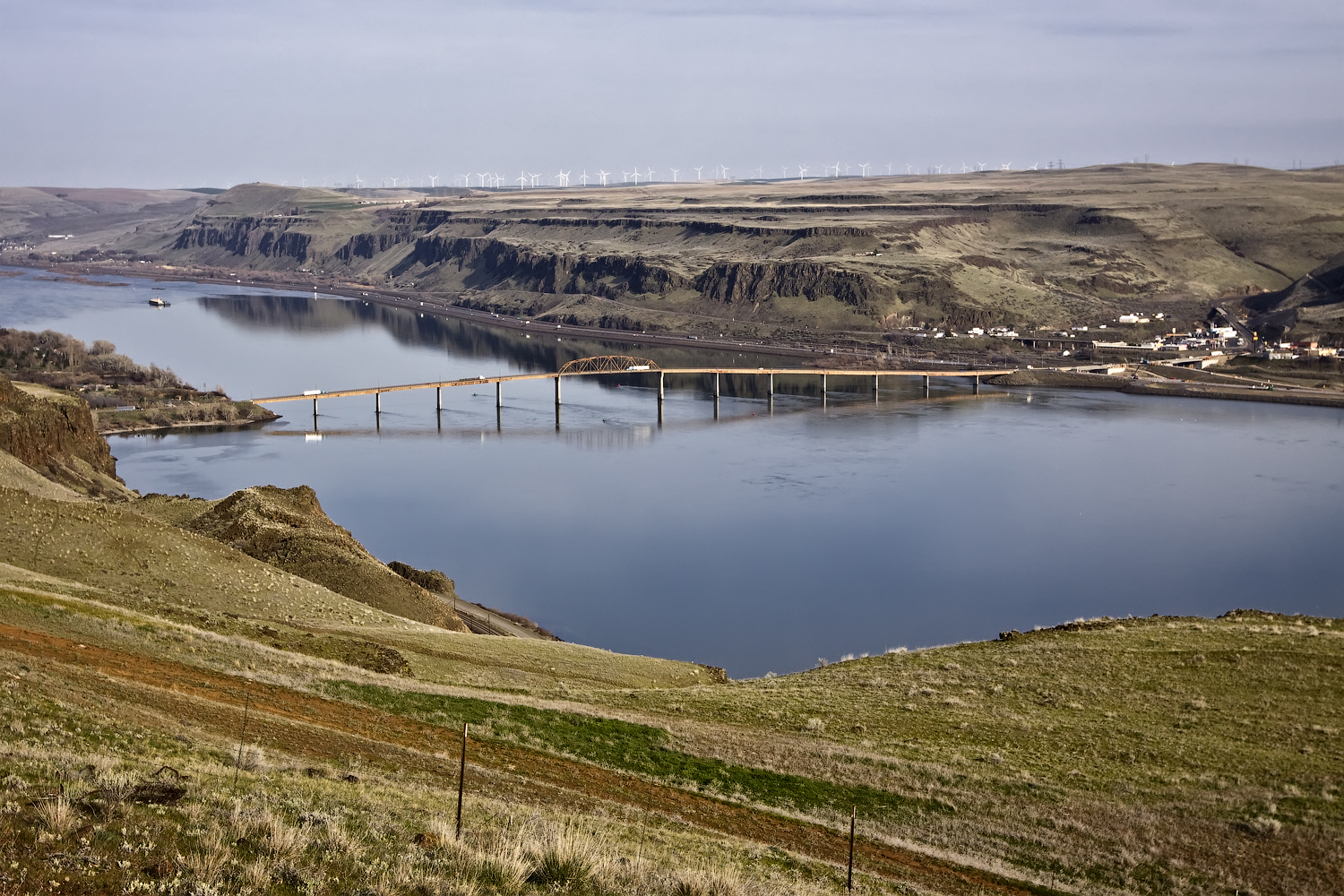
- Looking east from Washington in 2014
- Coordinates: 45.67600°N 120.83607°W
- Carries: US 97
- Crosses: Columbia River
- Locale: Biggs Junction, Oregon; Maryhill, Washington
- Official name: Sam Hill Memorial Bridge
- Maintained by: Washington State Department of Transportation

Characteristics
- Design: steel through-truss
- Total length: 2,567 ft (782 m)
- Width: 26 ft (7.9 m)
- Clearance below: 75 ft (23 m)

History
- Opened: November 1, 1962

Statistics
- Daily traffic: 5,100

Location
- Interactive map of Biggs Rapids Bridge

The Sam Hill Memorial Bridge, also known as the Biggs Rapids Bridge, is a steel truss bridge in the northwest United States that carries U.S. Route 97 (US 97) across the Columbia River between Biggs Junction in Sherman County, Oregon, and Maryhill in Klickitat County, Washington. It was named in honor of the early bridge proponent Sam Hill, the builder of the nearby Maryhill Museum of Art.

Construction on the Biggs Rapids Bridge began on October 3, 1960, and was funded by the Washington State Toll Bridge Authority. It is 2,567 feet (782 m) long, including a 341-foot (104 m) main truss span, and weighs 3,595,000 pounds (1,631,000 kg). The bridge cost $2.4 million to construct and was dedicated in honor of Sam Hill during its opening ceremonies on November 1, 1962. It was initially a toll bridge charging $1 per vehicle, but the tolls were removed in February 1975.

The bridge was closed during part of 2007–2008 in order to complete repairs to the deck. Originally the Washington State Department of Transportation planned to replace the entire deck in 2010, but accelerated the project due to rapidly deteriorating roadway. By March 2009 the project was finished at a total cost of project $16 million, split evenly between Oregon and Washington. It included replacing the deck with concrete, installing new railing, improving the drainage systems, and replacing the existing lighting. The new deck is expected to last 25 years.

== See also ==
- List of crossings of the Columbia River
