= Maryhill Stonehenge =

Stonehenge replica in Maryhill, Washington, U.S.

Coordinates: 45.694342°N 120.806115°W

- Stonehenge Memorial
- U.S. National Register of Historic Places
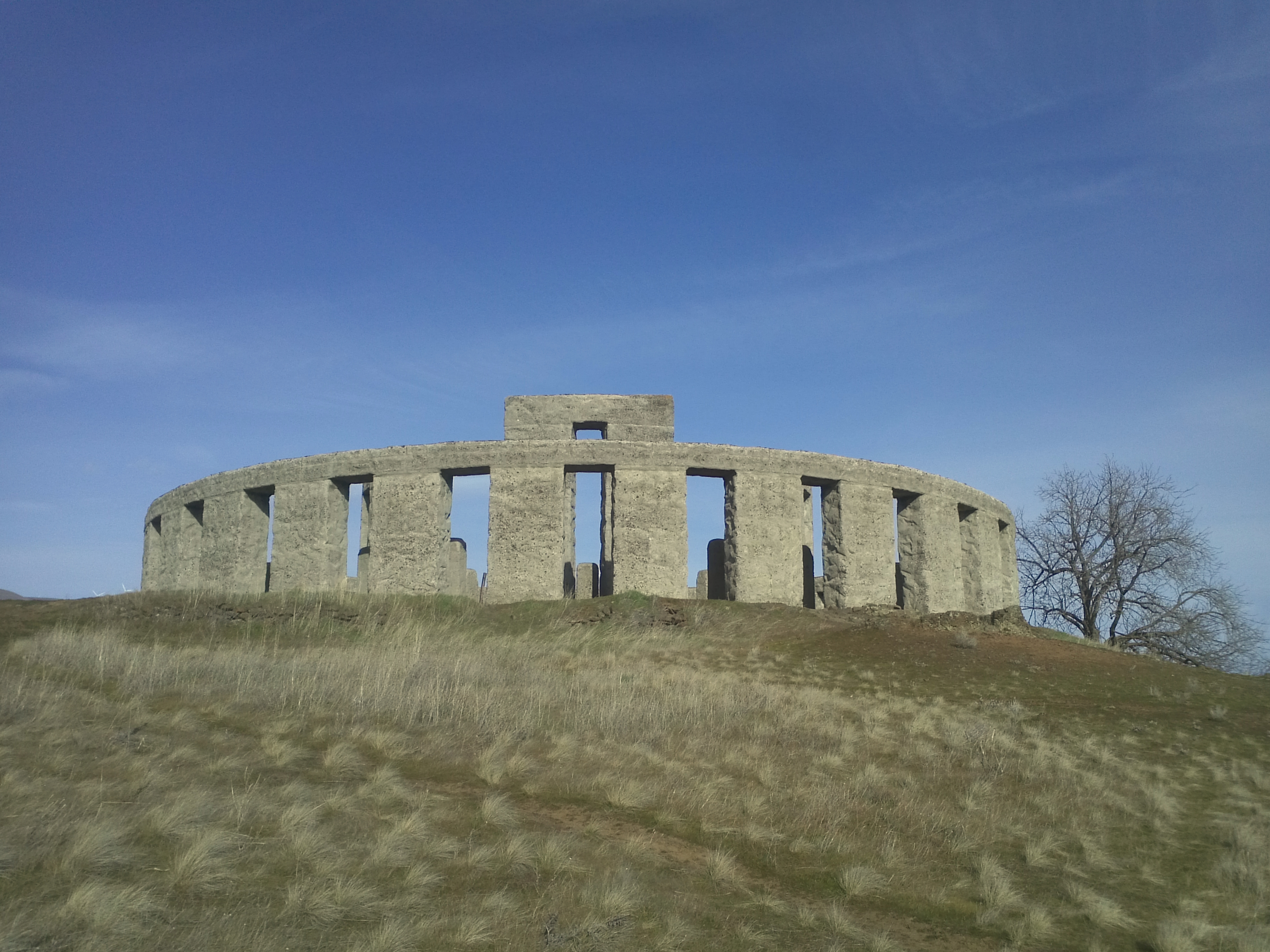
- View looking uphill
- Location: Maryhill, Washington
- Built: 1918–1929
- NRHP reference No.: 100006703
- Added to NRHP: June 28, 2021

The Maryhill Stonehenge is a replica of England's Stonehenge located in Maryhill, Washington, United States. It was commissioned in the early 20th century by the wealthy entrepreneur Sam Hill and dedicated on July 4, 1918, as a memorial to the men who had died in World War I from Klickitat County.

The concrete memorial commenced construction in 1918 and was completed in 1929. It was listed on the National Register of Historic Places in 2021.

== History ==
The Maryhill Stonehenge was the first monument in the United States to honor the dead of World War I – specifically, soldiers from Klickitat County, Washington, who had died in the then-ongoing war. The altar stone is placed to be aligned with sunrise on the summer solstice.

Following the then-prevalent interpretation of Stonehenge, Hill thought that the original monument had been used as a sacrificial site. He was a Quaker and commissioned the replica as a reminder that humanity is still capable of being sacrificed to the god of war.

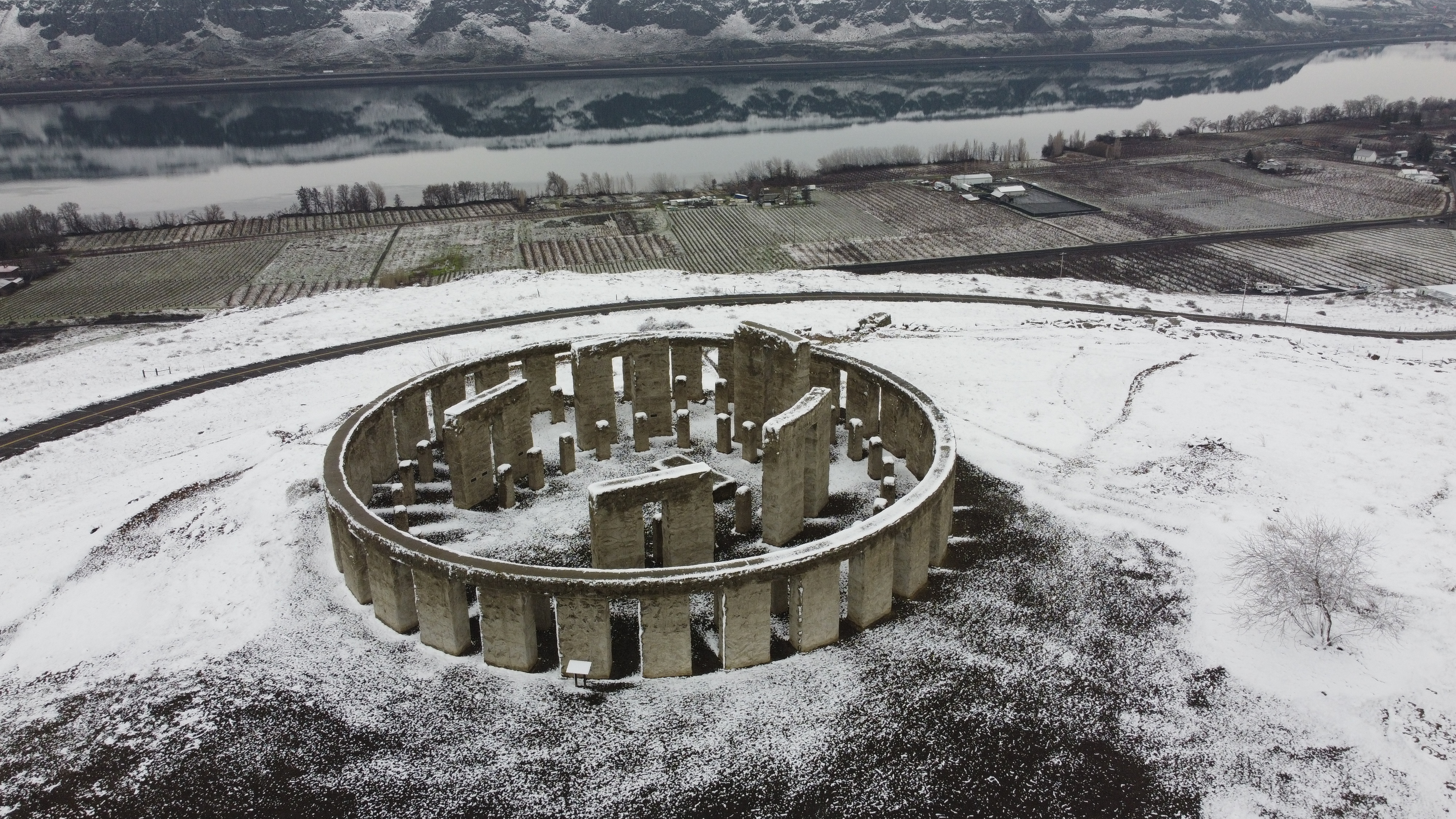
Maryhill Stonehenge in 2024.

The monument is located within the former site of the town of Maryhill; the town later burned down, leaving only the concrete replica standing. The memorial overlooks the Columbia Gorge. A second formal dedication of the monument took place on its completion on May 30, 1929. Sam Hill died in 1931, but lived long enough to see the re-installation of his Stonehenge replica completed.

The dedication plaque on this Washington Stonehenge is inscribed:

In memory of the soldiers and sailors of Klickitat County who gave their lives in defense of their country. This monument is erected in the hope that others inspired by the example of their valor and their heroism may share in that love of liberty and burn with that fire of patriotism which death can alone quench.

== Current status ==
The Maryhill Stonehenge, which has nearby monuments to the soldiers of Klickitat County who died in World War II, Korea, Vietnam and Afghanistan, is now part of the Maryhill Museum of Art.

This concrete landmark is located off U.S. Highway 97, about two miles from the Sam Hill Memorial Bridge. Admission is free to visit the memorial but donations for its continued maintenance are accepted.

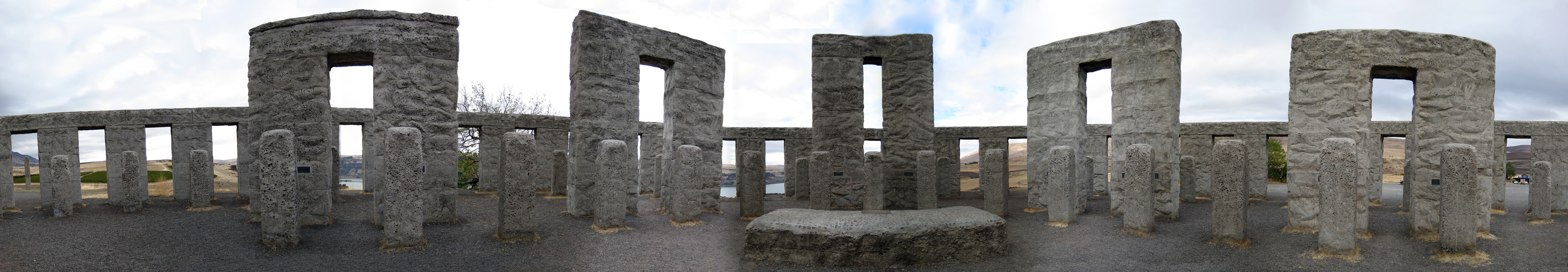
360° panorama inside the Maryhill Stonehenge replica. Plaques commemorating WWI soldiers can be seen as well as glimpses of the Columbia River
