= Harvard Club =

The Harvard Club is a private social club for alumni and associates of Harvard University with chapters all over the world.

Notable chapters include:

- Harvard Club of Boston
- Harvard Club of New York
- Harvard Club of Washington DC
