= Maryhill, Washington =

- Census-designated place
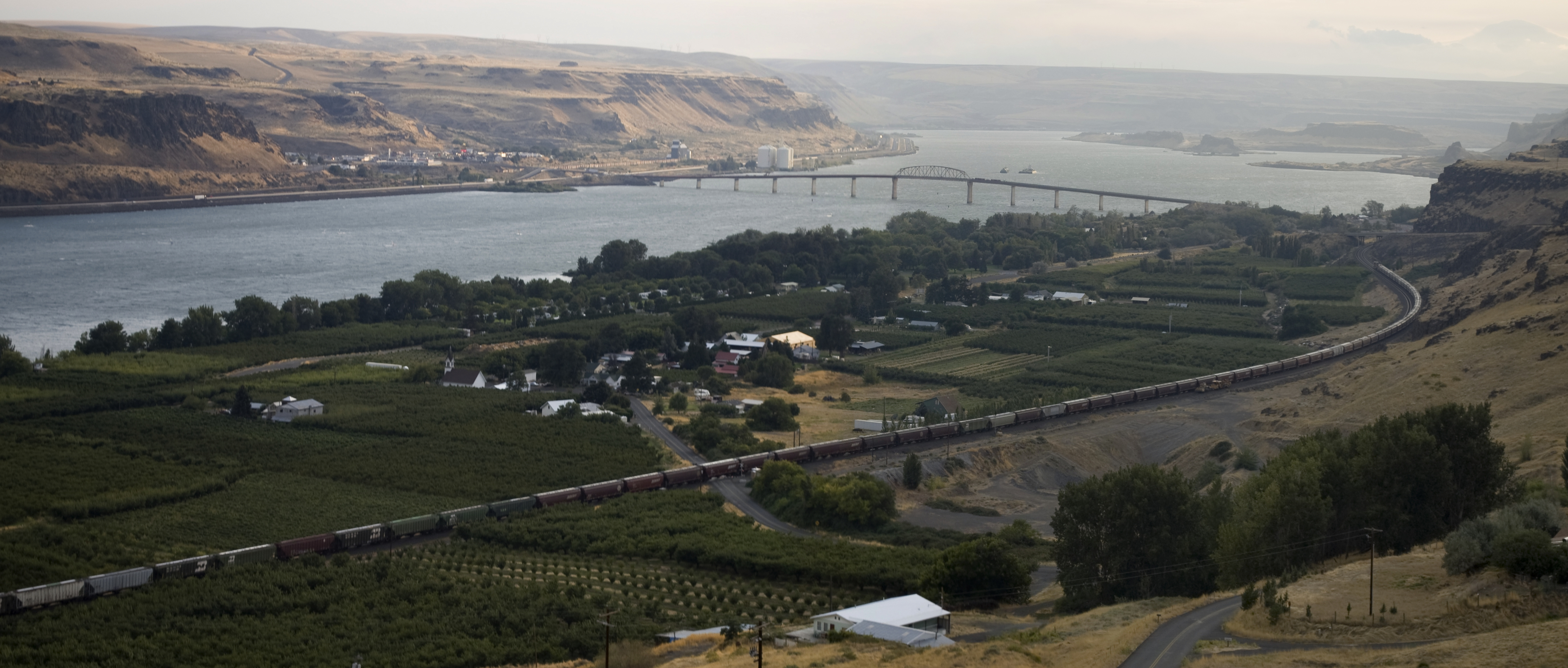
- Maryhill from the Stonehenge replica

- Location of Maryhill in Klickitat County, Washington
- Coordinates: 45°41′34″N 120°48′26″W
- Country: United States
- State: Washington
- County: Klickitat

Area
  - Total: 2.8 sq mi (7.3 km^{2})
  - Land: 2.8 sq mi (7.3 km^{2})
  - Water: 0 sq mi (0.0 km^{2})
- Elevation: 443 ft (135 m)

Population (2020)
  - Total: 55
  - Density: 20/sq mi (7.5/km^{2})
- Time zone: UTC-8 (Pacific (PST))
  - Summer (DST): UTC-7 (PDT)
- ZIP code: 98620
- Area code: 509
- FIPS code: 53-43885
- GNIS feature ID: 2408188

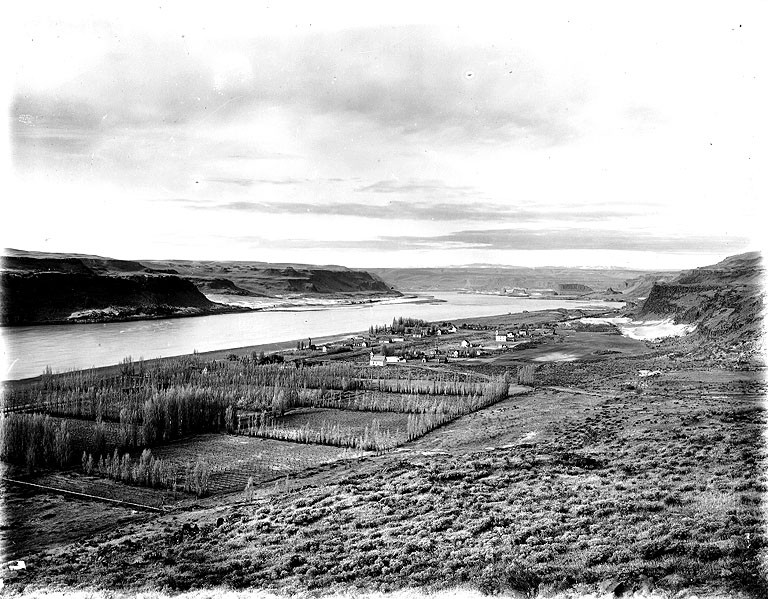
Maryhill from the Stonehenge replica location, but in 1913

Maryhill is an unincorporated community and census-designated place (CDP) in Klickitat County, Washington, United States. The population was 55 at the 2020 census.

== History ==
Maryhill is named after the wife and daughter of regional icon Sam Hill, who purchased land and envisioned a community there shortly after the turn of the 20th century. Earlier the area was known as "Columbia" or "Columbus". In 1909, the Klickitat County commissioners had accepted the town's name as "Maryland" - proposed by Sam Hill and Associates who had laid out the town. However, this name was rejected by postal authorities as they would not accept a name corresponding to a state, so it was renamed "Maryhill".

Hill used his Maryhill property to build the first paved roads in the Pacific Northwest, the Maryhill Museum of Art (originally intended as a grand residence for the Hills), Maryhill Stonehenge, a monument to the World War I casualties of Klickitat County in the form of a Stonehenge replica, and a planned community. Born a Quaker, Hill hoped to attract a Quaker community to eastern Washington. His plans never materialized and the town buildings he constructed burned down several years later.

Hill intended the Stonehenge replica to express that modern warfare was a form of needless human sacrifice, referencing the contemporary belief that Stonehenge was a sacrificial site.

== Geography ==
Maryhill is located along the southern edge of Klickitat County and the state of Washington at 45°41′8″N 120°49′2″W (45.685649, -120.817232). It sits on the north bank of the Columbia River, 209 miles (336 km) by river upstream from its mouth at Astoria, 103 miles (166 km) upstream from Portland, and 17 miles (27 km) upstream from The Dalles Dam.

U.S. Route 97 (US 97) crosses the Columbia at Maryhill via the Sam Hill Memorial Bridge. US 97 travels north towards Goldendale and south across the river to Wasco, Oregon. State Route 14 travels east–west through the area along the Columbia River, connecting Maryhill to White Salmon and Interstate 82 at Plymouth.

According to the United States Census Bureau, the Maryhill CDP has a total area of 2.8 square miles (7.3 km^{2}), all land. The community is home to Maryhill State Park along the Columbia.

== Demographics ==
Historical population
Census	Pop.	Note	%±
2000	98		—
2010	58		−40.8%
2020	55		−5.2%
U.S. Decennial Census; 1990 2000 2010 2020

Marryhill first appeared as a census designated place in the 2000 U.S. census.

=== Racial and ethnic composition ===
Maryhill CDP, Washington – Racial and ethnic composition Note: the US Census treats Hispanic/Latino as an ethnic category. This table excludes Latinos from the racial categories and assigns them to a separate category. Hispanics/Latinos may be of any race.
Race / Ethnicity (NH = Non-Hispanic)	Pop 2000	Pop 2010	Pop 2020	% 2000	% 2010	% 2020
White alone (NH)	76	42	43	77.55%	72.41%	78.18%
Black or African American alone (NH)	0	0	0	0.00%	0.00%	0.00%
Native American or Alaska Native alone (NH)	2	1	1	2.04%	1.72%	1.82%
Asian alone (NH)	0	1	1	0.00%	1.72%	1.82%
Native Hawaiian or Pacific Islander alone (NH)	1	0	0	1.02%	0.00%	0.00%
Other race alone (NH)	1	0	0	1.02%	0.00%	0.00%
Mixed race or Multiracial (NH)	9	5	7	9.18%	8.62%	12.73%
Hispanic or Latino (any race)	9	9	3	9.18%	15.52%	5.45%
Total	98	58	55	100.00%	100.00%	100.00%

=== 2000 census ===
As of the census of 2000, there were 98 people, 40 households, and 26 families residing in the CDP. The population density was 35.0 people per square mile (13.5/km^{2}). There were 49 housing units at an average density of 17.5/sq mi (6.8/km^{2}). The racial makeup of the CDP was 77.55% White, 9.18% African American, 2.04% Native American, 1.02% Pacific Islander, 1.02% from other races, and 9.18% from two or more races. Hispanic or Latino of any race were 9.18% of the population.

There were 40 households, out of which 30.0% had children under the age of 18 living with them, 57.5% were married couples living together, 5.0% had a female householder with no husband present, and 35.0% were non-families. 22.5% of all households were made up of individuals, and 10.0% had someone living alone who was 65 years of age or older. The average household size was 2.45 and the average family size was 2.92.

In the CDP, the population was spread out, with 22.4% under the age of 18, 4.1% from 18 to 24, 27.6% from 25 to 44, 29.6% from 45 to 64, and 16.3% who were 65 years of age or older. The median age was 40 years. For every 100 females, there were 113.0 males. For every 100 females age 18 and over, there were 123.5 males.

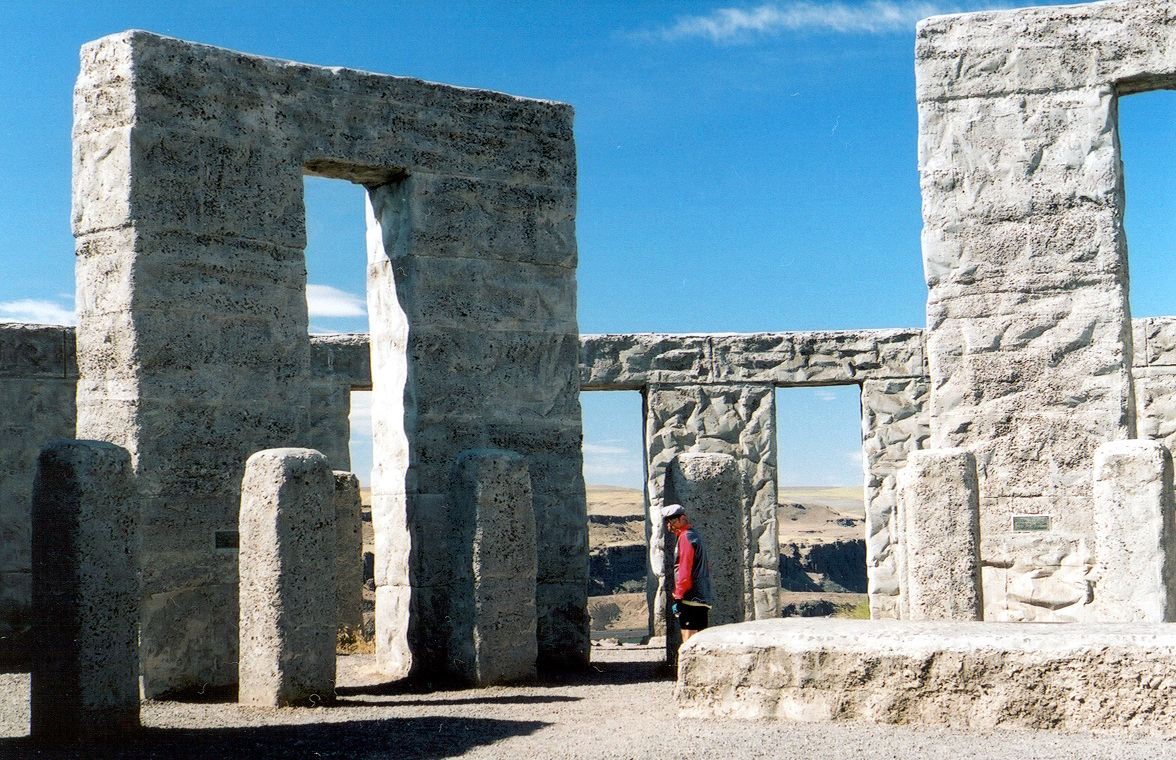
Maryhill Stonehenge

The median income for a household in the CDP was $37,250, and the median income for a family was $48,529. Males had a median income of $36,103 versus $28,750 for females. The per capita income for the CDP was $18,939. None of the population or families were below the poverty line.

== See also ==
- Stonehenge replicas and derivatives
