= Columbia River Highway =

Columbia River Highway may refer to:

- Historic Columbia River Highway (No. 100), a scenic highway built from 1913 to 1922 through the Columbia River Gorge, Oregon, U.S.
- Columbia River Highway No. 2, the highway from Portland to Washington via I-84 and US 730 that replaced the Historic Columbia River Highway in the gorge, Oregon, U.S.
- Lower Columbia River Highway (No. 2W), route US 30 between Astoria and Portland, Oregon, U.S.

== See also ==
- Washington State Route 14, a highway on the north side of the Columbia River, Oregon, U.S.
