= Maryhill Museum of Art =

Art museum near Maryhill, Washington, U.S.

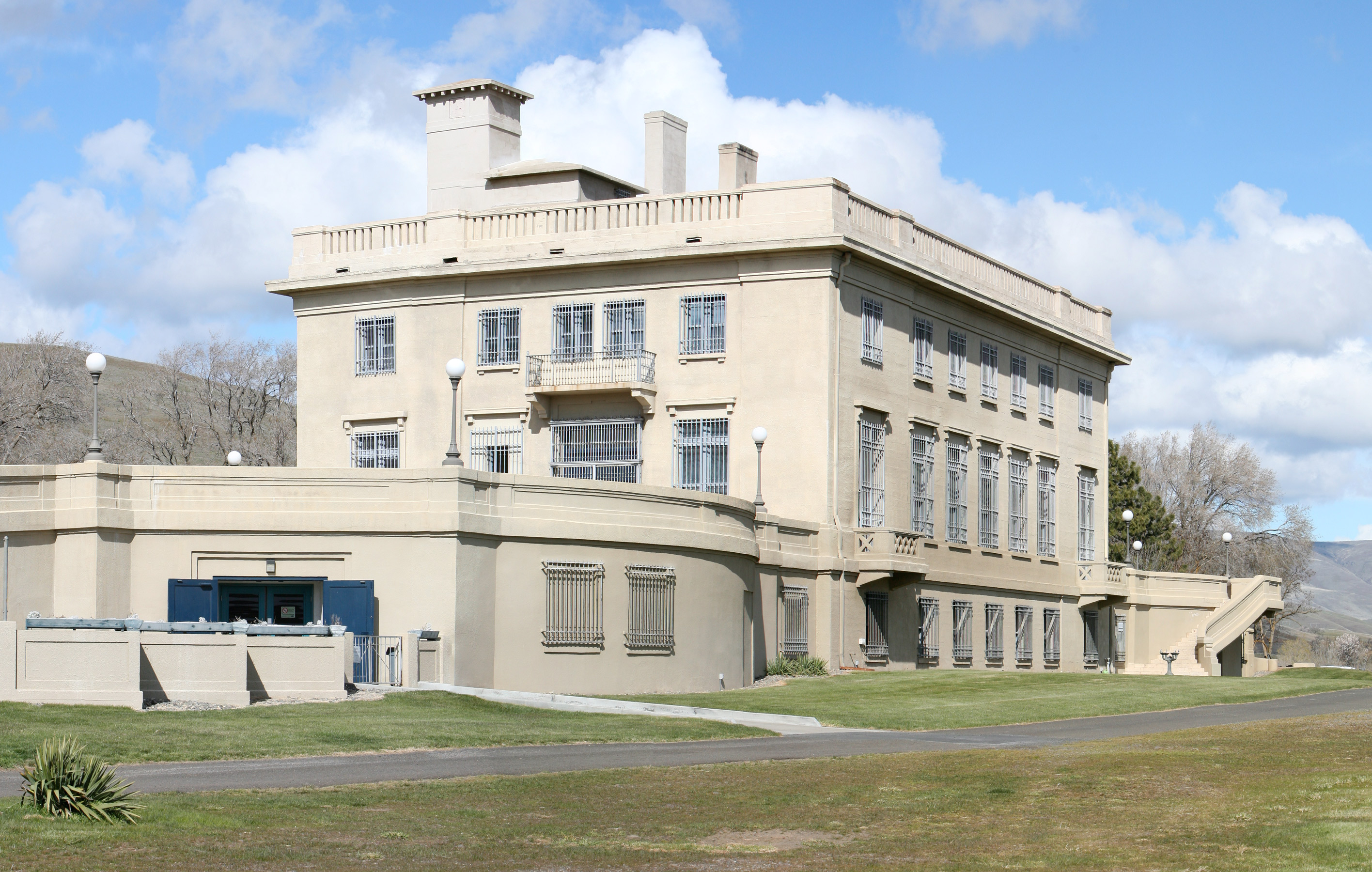
- Established: 1940
- Location: near Maryhill, Washington
- Website: www.maryhillmuseum.org
- Maryhill
- U.S. National Register of Historic Places
- Location within Washington (state)
- Nearest city: Goldendale, Washington
- Coordinates: 45°40′40″N 120°51′48″W
- Area: 34 acres (13.8 ha)
- Built: 1914
- Architect: Hornblower & Marshall
- Architectural style: Beaux-Arts
- NRHP reference No.: 74001966
- Added to NRHP: December 31, 1974

Maryhill Museum of Art is a small museum with an eclectic collection, located near what is now the community of Maryhill in the U.S. state of Washington.

The museum is situated on a bluff overlooking the eastern end of the Columbia River Gorge. The structure was originally intended as a mansion for entrepreneur Samuel Hill (1857–1931), and was designed by architects Hornblower and Marshall. It was named Maryhill for Hill's wife, daughter of James J. Hill, a Great Northern Railroad baron, and was intended to be used as a home at which they could entertain Samuel Hill's school friend King Albert I of Belgium. Construction was halted upon America's entry into World War I. The unfinished museum building was dedicated on November 3, 1926 by Queen Marie of Romania, and was opened to the public on Hill's birthday (May 13) in 1940. The museum's first physical expansion was completed when the Mary and Bruce Stevenson Wing opened to the public in May 2012. It includes a plaza that overlooks the Columbia River, an education center, a collections suite, and a café.

== Collection ==
Notable in the Maryhill Museum collection are:

- Plaster and bronze sculptures and watercolors by Auguste Rodin, including versions of some of his most important works: The Burghers of Calais, The Thinker and portions of The Gates of Hell.
- European and American paintings, including works by William McGregor Paxton, R. H. Ives Gammell, William Stanley Haseltine, Frederic Leighton, 1st Baron Leighton and Edwin Blashfield.
- American Indian art, including baskets and beadwork from the Columbia Plateau region,
- Mannequins and replica stage sets from the Théâtre de la Mode,
- More than 300 chess sets from around the world,
- Eastern Orthodox icons, including some donated by Queen Marie of Romania,
- Palace furnishings and personal items that once belonged to Queen Marie,
- Memorabilia associated with the dancer Loie Fuller,
- Art Nouveau-era glass by Émile Gallé, René Lalique and others,
- A permanent exhibit about Samuel Hill's life and projects,
- An outdoor sculpture park containing more than a dozen works by Pacific Northwest artists,
- Maryhill Loops Road, the first asphalt road in Washington state (1911) and site of the annual Maryhill Festival of Speed—the only International Gravity Sports Association World Cup race in North America.

== History ==
The Maryhill Museum building was designed as a private residence for Sam Hill by Washington, D.C., architects Hornblower & Marshall. It was designed in a Beaux-Arts style and built of steel-reinforced concrete beginning in 1914. Hill imagined the structure as a ranch building amidst a 5,300-acre agricultural community that he was developing at the eastern end of the Columbia River Gorge. During a 1917 visit by his friend Loïe Fuller, he decided to turn his unfinished home into “a museum for the public good, and for the betterment of French art in the far Northwest of America.” Hill's contribution to the new museum included almost 90 American Indian baskets, more than 70 Rodin sculptures and watercolors, and many personal items.

Fuller, herself, provided the museum with plaster casts of the hands of more than a dozen period celebrities. She gave the museum numerous small, carved ivory crucifix figures that were originally given to her by Désiré-Joseph Mercier, Cardinal Archbishop of Mechelen. She also convinced some of her many friends to make their own donations to the fledgling museum.

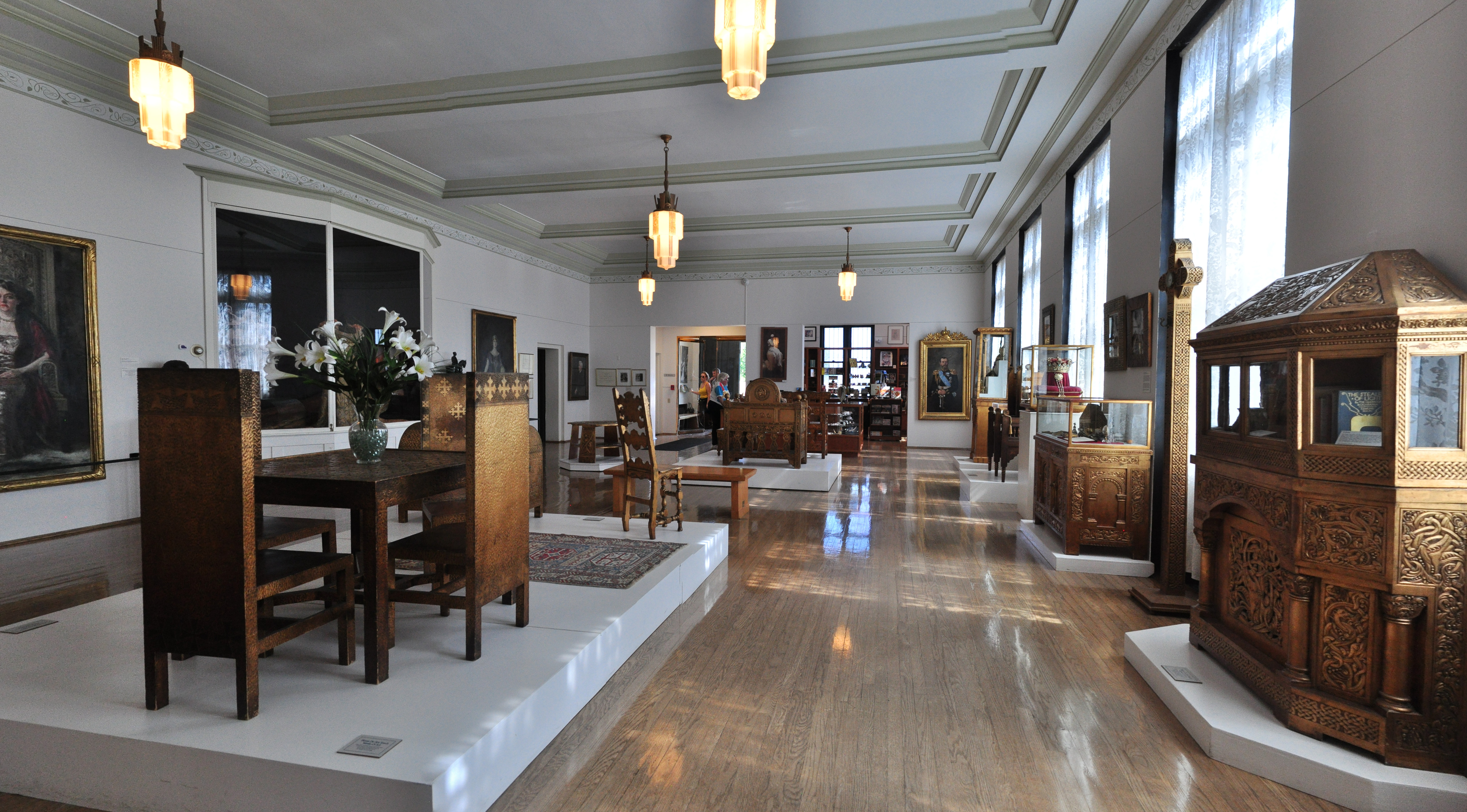
Palace furnishings of Queen Marie and other related items.

During her 1926 visit for the museum's dedication, Queen Marie of Romania gave Maryhill more than 100 objects. These included personal items, Romanian folk objects, Russian icons and diverse textiles. That same year, Queen Marie's oldest daughter Elisabetha, the former Queen Consort of Greece, gave the museum a collection of small Tanagra figurines and a number of ancient Cypriot amphorae. A year earlier, the museum had received its very first donation—three silver filigree objects—from Queen Marie's second daughter, Marie, Queen Consort of the Serbs, Croats and Slovenes.

Maryhill Museum owes a profound debt to its fourth great patron, Alma de Bretteville Spreckels. Following the deaths of Hill (1931), Fuller (1928) and Queen Marie (1938), she worked tirelessly to turn Sam Hill's unfinished mansion into an art museum. Over the years, Spreckels had acquired many objects from Queen Marie that were intended for a "Romanian Room" in San Francisco's California Palace of the Legion of Honor. She instead donated this material to Maryhill Museum in 1938. It included Queen Marie's gold throne and other unique pieces of Byzantine-inspired furniture, a replica of her coronation crown, and other objects. Spreckels also gave Maryhill a collection of art glass by artists such as Émile Gallé and René Lalique, some Art Deco ceramics by Serafim Sudbinin, European paintings, and ecclesiastical textiles from the Armenian Apostolic Church.

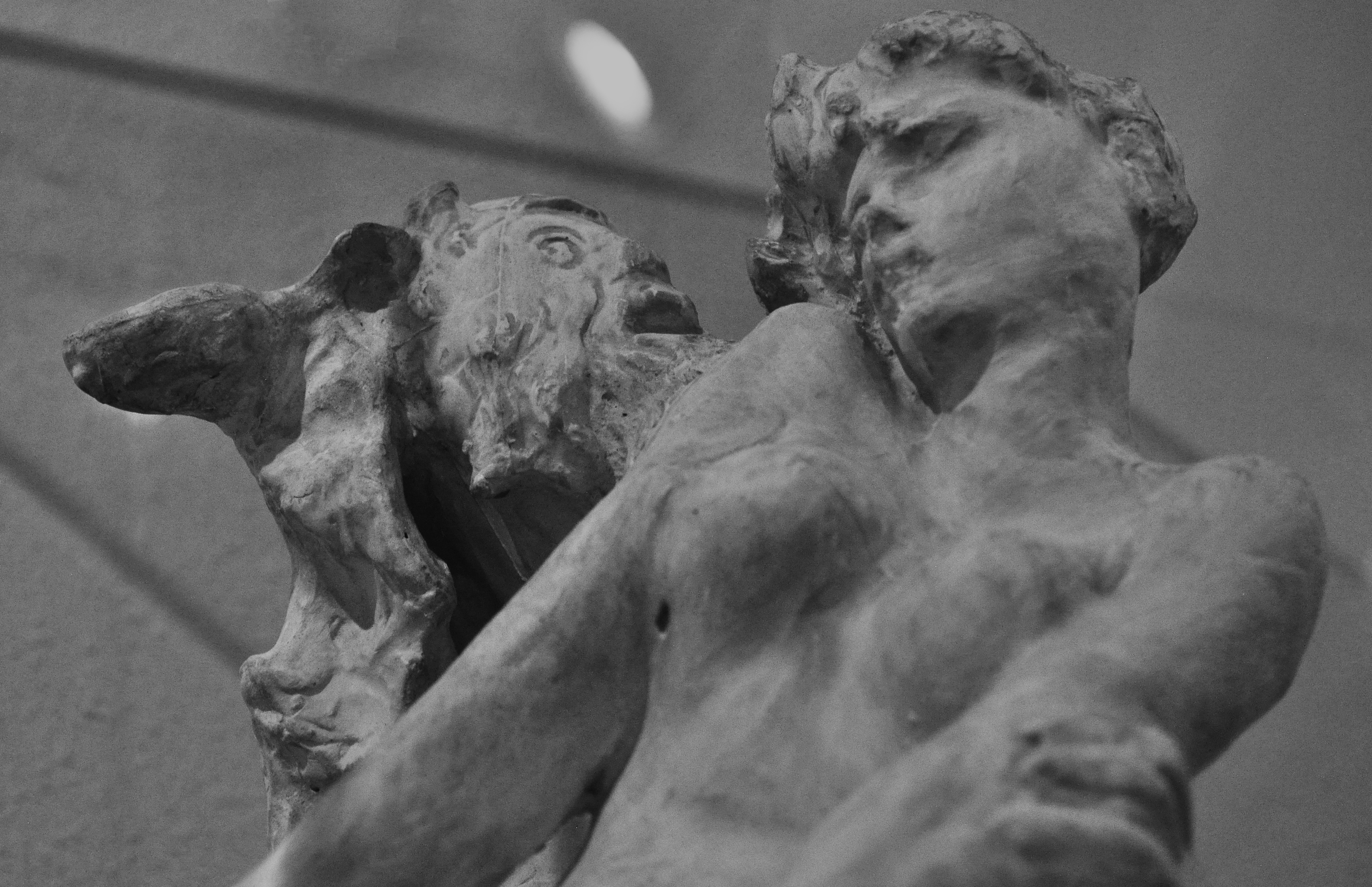
Detail of Rodin's Minotaur, one of many Rodin sculptures at Maryhill.

Spreckels’ efforts also helped bring the Théâtre de la Mode to Maryhill. After being displayed in Paris in 1945–1946, the mannequins toured Europe and the United States. Their final American venue was the M. H. de Young Memorial Museum in San Francisco. Organizers then attempted to return them to Paris, but the Théâtre de la Mode originator, the Chambre Syndicale de la Couture Parisienne, was unwilling to pay custom charges. The mannequins were stored in San Francisco's City of Paris department store while a decision was made about their future. Spreckels suggested that the mannequins be sent to Maryhill, and they arrived at the museum in time for the 1952 season.

Others also contributed to the early growth of Maryhill's art collection. Clifford Dolph, who served as the museum's first director (1938–1972), had a passion for chess. With the encouragement of the museum's Board of Trustees, he began collecting chess sets in 1957. Dolph was also an astute admirer of realist painting and many of the museum's most important works of art were acquired during his tenure. He exhibited, purchased and promoted the work of American artists associated with Classical Realism. In 2000, the R. H. Ives Gammell Studios Trust gave the museum a 23-panel series titled A Pictorial Sequence Painted by R. H. Ives Gammell Based on The Hound of Heaven. The paintings had premiered at Maryhill in 1957 and the museum's relationship with Gammell and the artists in his circle can be directly linked to the decision to permanently place the works at the museum.

American Indian art has always been an important part of Maryhill Museum's mission. Beginning with Sam Hill's own collection, the Indian basketry holdings now total more than 900 items. A particularly important Indian art donation was made in 1940 by Mary Underwood Lane. She was the granddaughter of Cascade chief Welawa, also known as Chief Chenoweth. Lane's gift included fur trade-era objects and many carved, woven and beaded items from the Middle Columbia River region. A large collection of Arctic material was given to the museum in 1979 by the heirs of Harvey T. Harding, who had operated a store in Nome, Alaska, from 1899 to 1907. Harding kept a journal of his Arctic experiences and a careful record of the objects that he collected—many of which are identified by place and date of collection.

The museum collection also includes numerous historic photographs, archival materials and reference texts.

Maryhill Stonehenge, a concrete replica Stonehenge, is located at the eastern end of Maryhill Museum's property, about four miles from the primary museum building. It was commissioned by Sam Hill and dedicated in 1918 as a memorial to local World War I dead. It was completed in 1929.
