= Gammell =

Gammell is a surname. Notable people with the surname include:

- Bill Gammell (born 1952), Scottish sportsman and industrialist
- James Gammell (1892–1975), British Army officer
- R. H. Ives Gammell (1893–1981), American muralist, portrait painter, art teacher, and writer on art
- Ray Gammell, Irish businessman
- Robin Gammell (born 1936), Canadian film, television and stage actor
- Stephen Gammell (born 1943), American illustrator of children's books
