= Atelier =

Workshop or studio of a professional artist in the fine or decorative arts

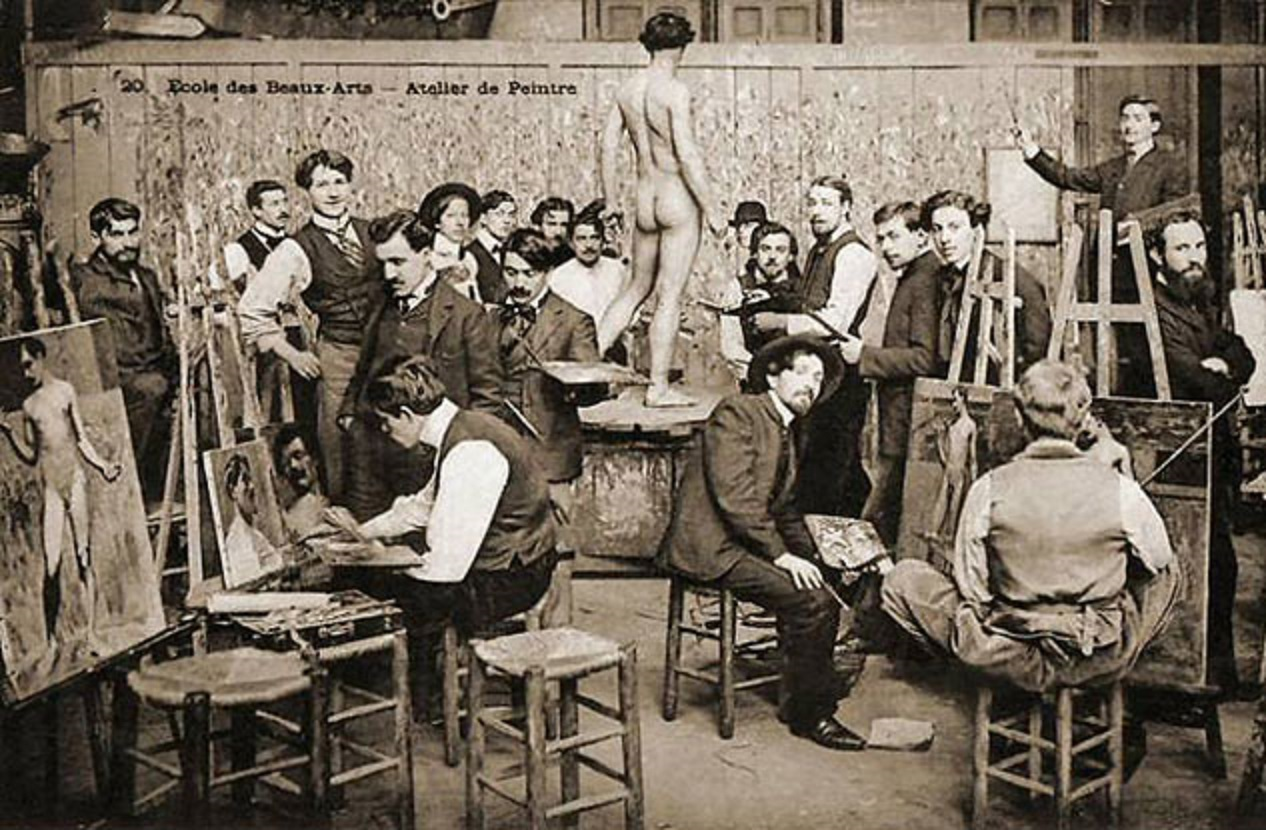
French Atelier of Painters: titled "School of Fine Arts - Painter Workshop" (Ecole des Beaux-Arts - Atelier de Peintre)

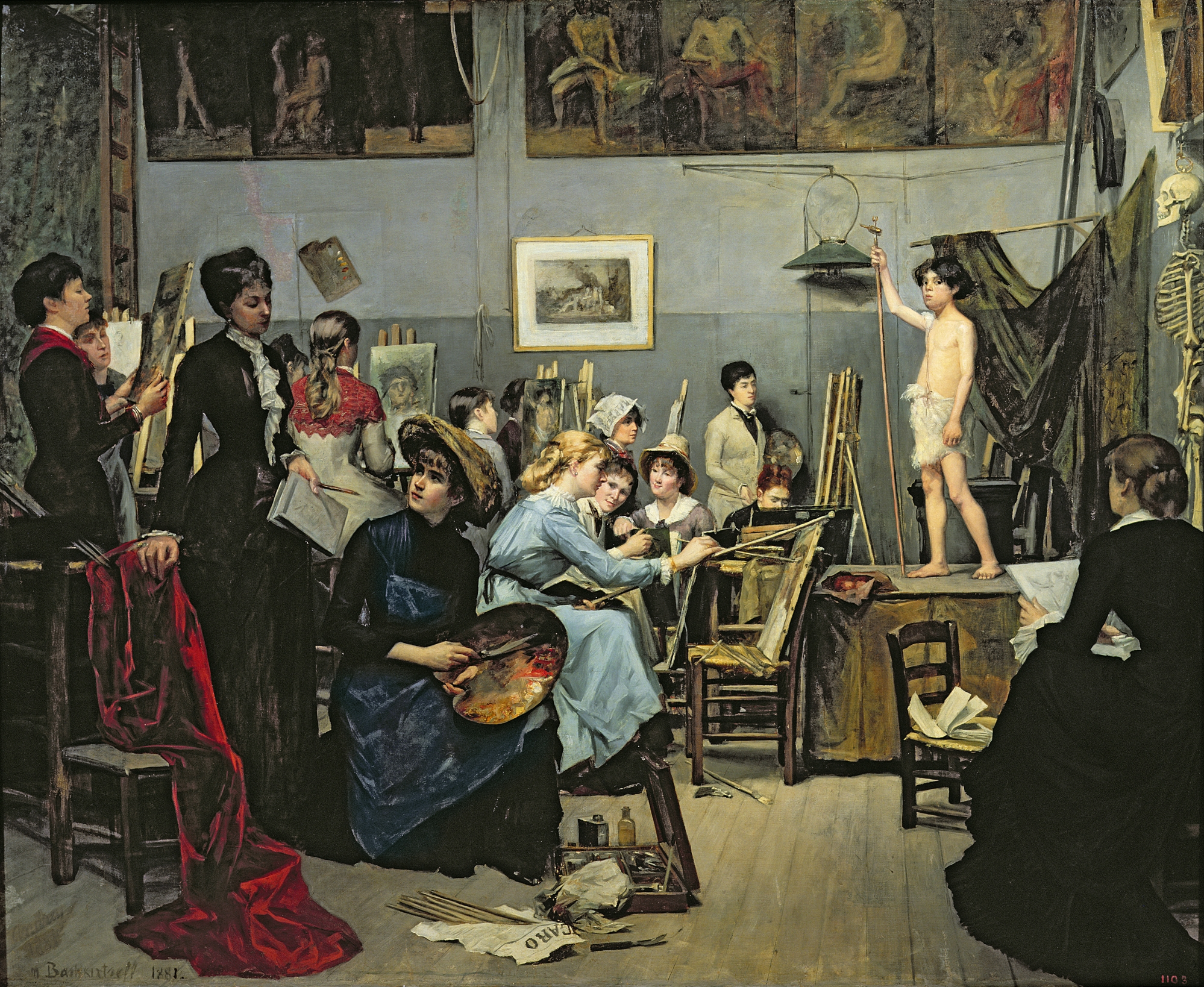
Robert-Fleury's Atelier at Académie Julian for female art students - painting by student Marie Bashkirtseff (1881)

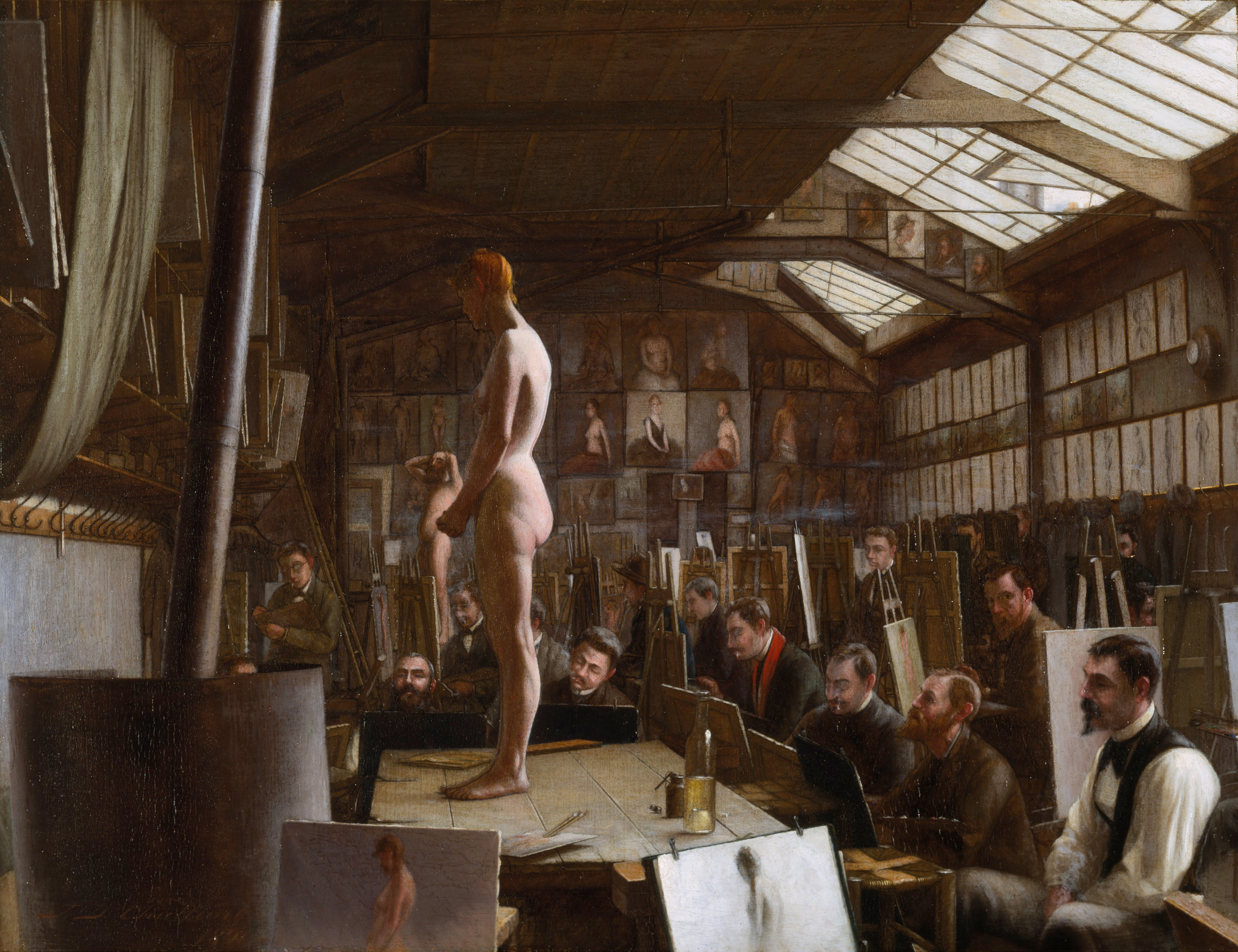
Bouguereau's Atelier at Académie Julian in Paris by Jefferson David Chalfant (1891)

An atelier (French: [atəlje]) is the private workshop or studio of a professional artist in the fine or decorative arts or an architect, where a principal master and a number of assistants, students, and apprentices can work together producing fine art or visual art released under the master's name or supervision.

Ateliers were the standard vocational practice for European artists from the Middle Ages to the 19th century, and common elsewhere in the world. In medieval Europe this way of working and teaching was often enforced by local guild regulations, such as those of the painters' Guild of Saint Luke, and of other craft guilds. Apprentices usually began working on simple tasks when young, and after some years with increasing knowledge and expertise became journeymen, before possibly becoming masters themselves. This master-apprentice system was gradually replaced as the once powerful guilds declined, and the academy became a favored method of training. However, many professional artists continued using students and assistants as they had been in ateliers; sometimes the artist paid the student-assistants, while sometimes they paid the artist fees to learn.

In art, the atelier consists of a master artist, usually a professional painter, sculptor, or architect—or from the mid-19th century a fine art photographer—working with a small number of students to train them in visual or fine arts. An atelier can also be the work and study space of an haute couture fashion designer, hair stylist, or artists more generally. Atelier schools can be found around the world, particularly in North America and Western Europe.

Although the methods vary, most painting ateliers train students in the skills and techniques associated with creating some form of representational art, the making of two-dimensional images that appear real to the viewer. They traditionally include sessions for drawing or painting nude art.

== Methods ==
=== Sight-size ===
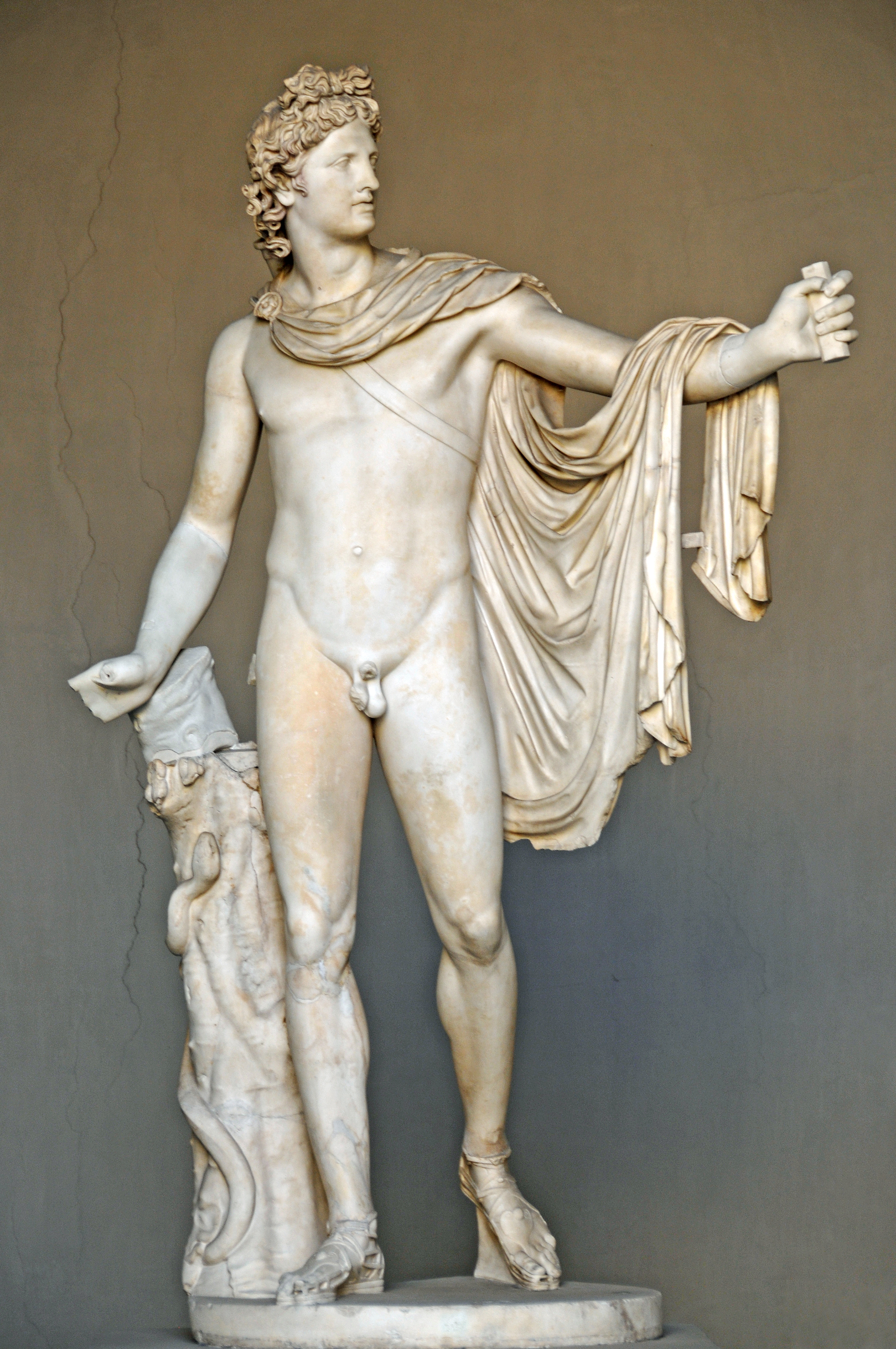
Apollo Belvedere, (350-325 BC) Vatican Museums

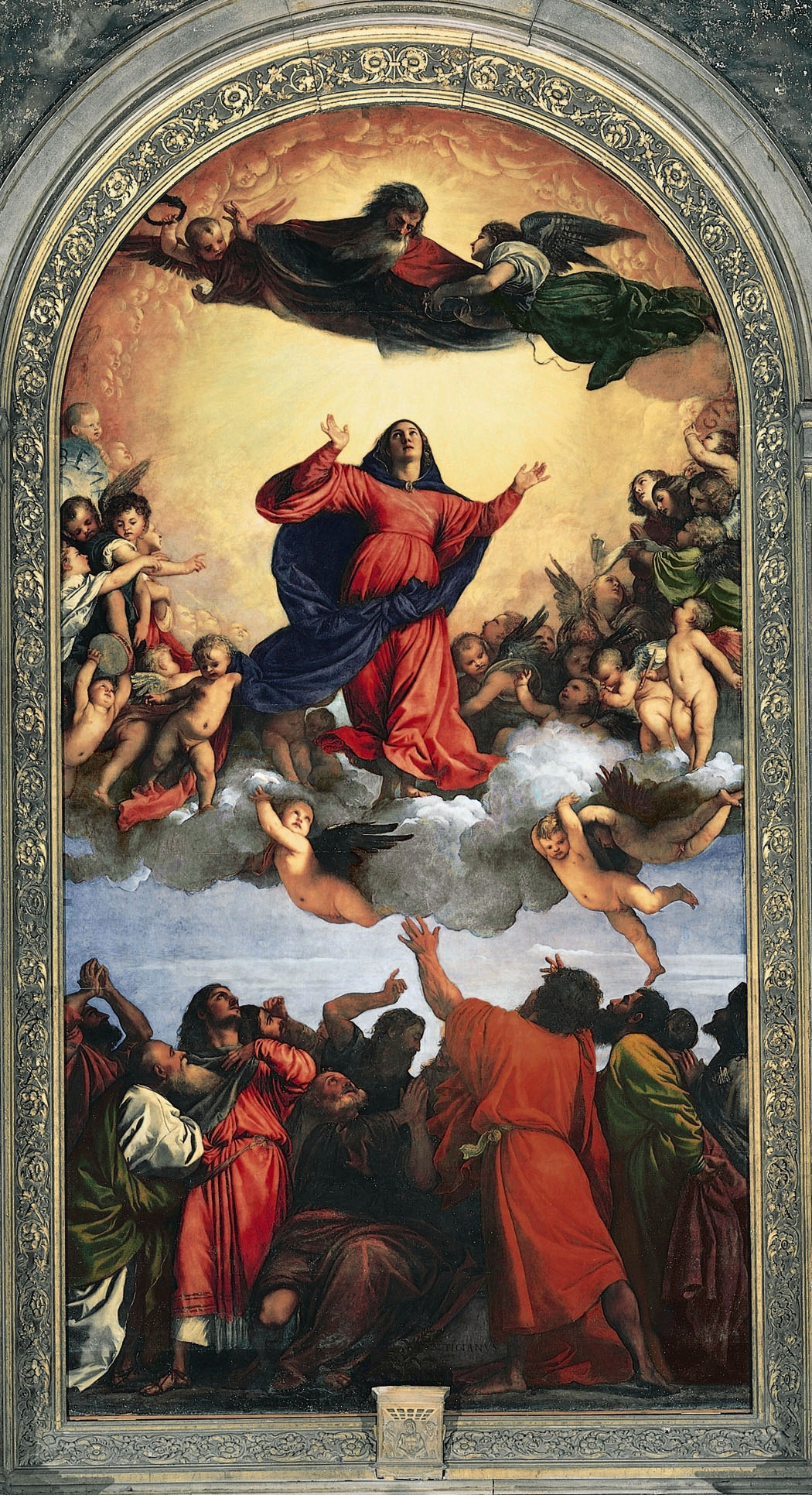
Titian, Assumption of the Virgin (1516–1518)

Sight-size is a method of drawing and painting an object exactly as it appears to the artist, on a one-to-one scale. The artist first sets a vantage point where the subject and the drawing surface appear to be the same size. Then, using a variety of measuring tools—which can include levels, mirrors, plumb bobs, strings, and sticks—the artist draws the subject so that, when viewed from the set vantage point, the drawing and the subject have exactly the same dimensions. When properly done, sight-size drawing can result in extremely accurate and realistic drawings. It can also be used to draw the exact dimensions for a model in preparation for a painting.

Ateliers following the sight-size method generally agree that the practice of careful drawing is the basis of painting, teaching a form of realism based upon careful observations of nature with attention to detail. Using this method, students progress through a series of tasks such as cast drawing, cast painting, drawing, and painting from the live model, and still life. Students must complete each task to the instructor's satisfaction before progressing to the next. This system is referred to as "systematic progression" or "systematic teaching and learning".

Atelier students often begin this progression by drawing plaster casts. These casts are usually faces, hands, or other parts of the human anatomy. Plaster casts provide some of the benefits of live, human models, such as the presence of natural shadows. They also have their own distinct advantages: they remain perfectly still and their white color allows the student to focus on the pure, grayscale tones of shadows.

One goal for sight-size students is to gain enough skill to transfer an accurate image to the paper or canvas without the aid of a mechanical device. Contemporary realist painter Adrian Gottlieb notes that "while professional painters pursuing a full-time career will develop an 'eye' that precludes the need for measuring devices and plumb lines (tools necessary during the training period), the observation method itself is not abandoned - instead it becomes second nature. Sight-size can be taught and applied in conjunction with a particular sensitivity to gesture to create life-like imagery; especially when applied to portraiture and figurative works."

Darren R. Rousar, former student of Richard F. Lack and Charles Cecil as well as the author of Cast Drawing Using the Sight-Size Approach, agrees and defines measuring in broad terms. He says that "a fully trained artist who uses Sight-size might never use a plumb line or even consciously think about literal measuring. He or she will strive toward achieving the same retinal impression in the painting as is seen in nature."

Art school owner Charles H. Cecil writes:

In reviving the atelier tradition, R. H. Ives Gammell (1893–1981) adopted sight-size as the basis of his teaching method. He founded his studio on the precedent of private ateliers, such as those of Carolus-Duran and Léon Bonnat. These French masters were accomplished sight-size portraitists who conveyed to their pupils a devotion to the art of Velázquez. Sargent was trained by both painters and that, in turn, his use of sight-size had a major influence in Great Britain and America.

Art from ateliers using the sight-size method is often reminiscent of Greek and Roman sculpture from classical antiquity, such as the Apollo Belvedere. Paintings may favor the visual imagery of the Neoclassical art of the mid-18th to 19th century. The sight-size method also lends itself to styles of portraiture in which the artists desires an accurate, natural, true to life, or even near photographic image of the sitter as is evident in the work of Bouguereau.

=== Comparative measurement ===
The comparative measurement method requires proportional accuracy, but allows the artist to vary the size of the image created. This technique broadly encompasses any method of drawing that involves making accurate measurements primarily using the naked eye. In the early training period students may be aided by a pencil, brush or plumb line to make comparisons, but there is no transfer of 1:1 measurements from subject directly to paper. Schools that teach this method include The Water Street Atelier and The Swedish Academy of Realist Art.

In his essay, "The Sight-size Method and its Disadvantages", the painter and instructor Hans-Peter Szameit, of the Swedish Academy of Realist Art, discusses the disadvantages of sight-size, describing it as essentially the making of a mechanically produced image limited to one size, the "sight size".

=== Illusion ===
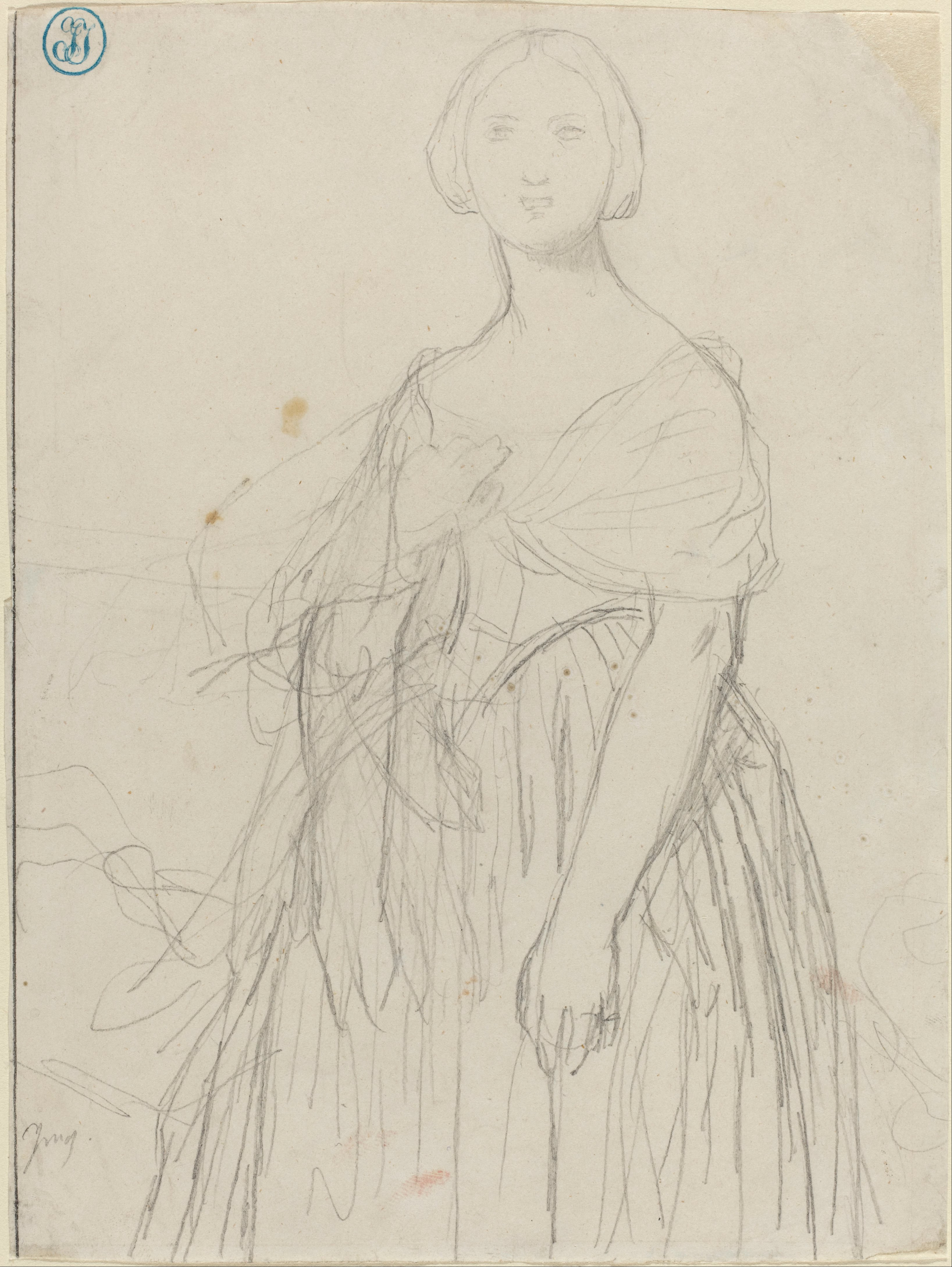
Sketch for Madame Moitessier, Jean Auguste Dominique Ingres

Another traditional atelier method incorporates the use of illusions that fool the viewer into believing an image is accurate. This method is most often taught in conjunction with advanced compositional theory. Since it is not necessary to copy the subject accurately to achieve a successful illusion, this method allows the artist to experiment with many options while retaining what appears to be a realistic image.

In one example, the Study of a male figure, for Mercury descending (c. 1613–1614 (drawn), in The Education of Marie de' Medici), Rubens has obscured the point where the legs attach to the torso. This is one factor that contributes to the ease in which he is able to successfully experiment with a variety of dramatically different leg placements. At least three sets of feet are visible. The viewer is not disturbed by an illogical attachment if the attachment is not visible and the resulting two-dimensional image is pleasing to the eye. This allows the artist to choose from a great number of very different alternatives, making his selection based on personal preference or aesthetics rather than accuracy. In the referenced exercise it is possible to experiment with numerous manipulations regarding the size and placement of each part of the body while at the same time using a collection of two-dimensional foreshortening illusions to retain the appearance of realism.

In addition to body parts, artists may rely on the manipulation of many other elements to achieve a successful illusion. These can include: the manipulation of color, value, edge characteristics, overlapping shapes, and a number of different types of paint applications such as glazing and scumbling. Work developed this way would not begin with a drawing, but rather the placement of all relevant elements necessary for the success of the illusions as well as the composition as a whole.

Many of the illusions designed to mimic reality also speed the painting process, allowing artists more time to design and complete complex large-scale works.

Individual students of this method study a diverse selection of old masters, although many begin their studies with the High Renaissance (1490s–1527), Mannerist (1520–1580), Baroque (1600–1725), and Impressionist (1870s–1880s) painters, including Leonardo da Vinci, Degas, Michelangelo, Raphael, Rubens, and Titian. However, because the emphasis is on creativity, it is often the design of the composition and the application and use of materials that is studied, with less focus placed on reproducing a particular style or subject.

Students of these ateliers will therefore exhibit a wide range of personal styles and increasing amounts of creative experimentation. The result is a group whose art is highly individualized, with each student pursuing their own individual interests. There was great diversity at the atelier of Léon Bonnat (1846–1855). Julius Kaplan characterised Bonnat as "a liberal teacher who stressed simplicity in art above high academic finish, as well as overall effect rather than detail."

Some of Bonnat's more notable students include: Fred Barnard, Georges Braque, Gustave Caillebotte, Suzor-Coté, Raoul Dufy, Thomas Eakins, Aloysius O'Kelly, John Singer Sargent, Henri de Toulouse-Lautrec, and Marius Vasselon

== Gallery ==
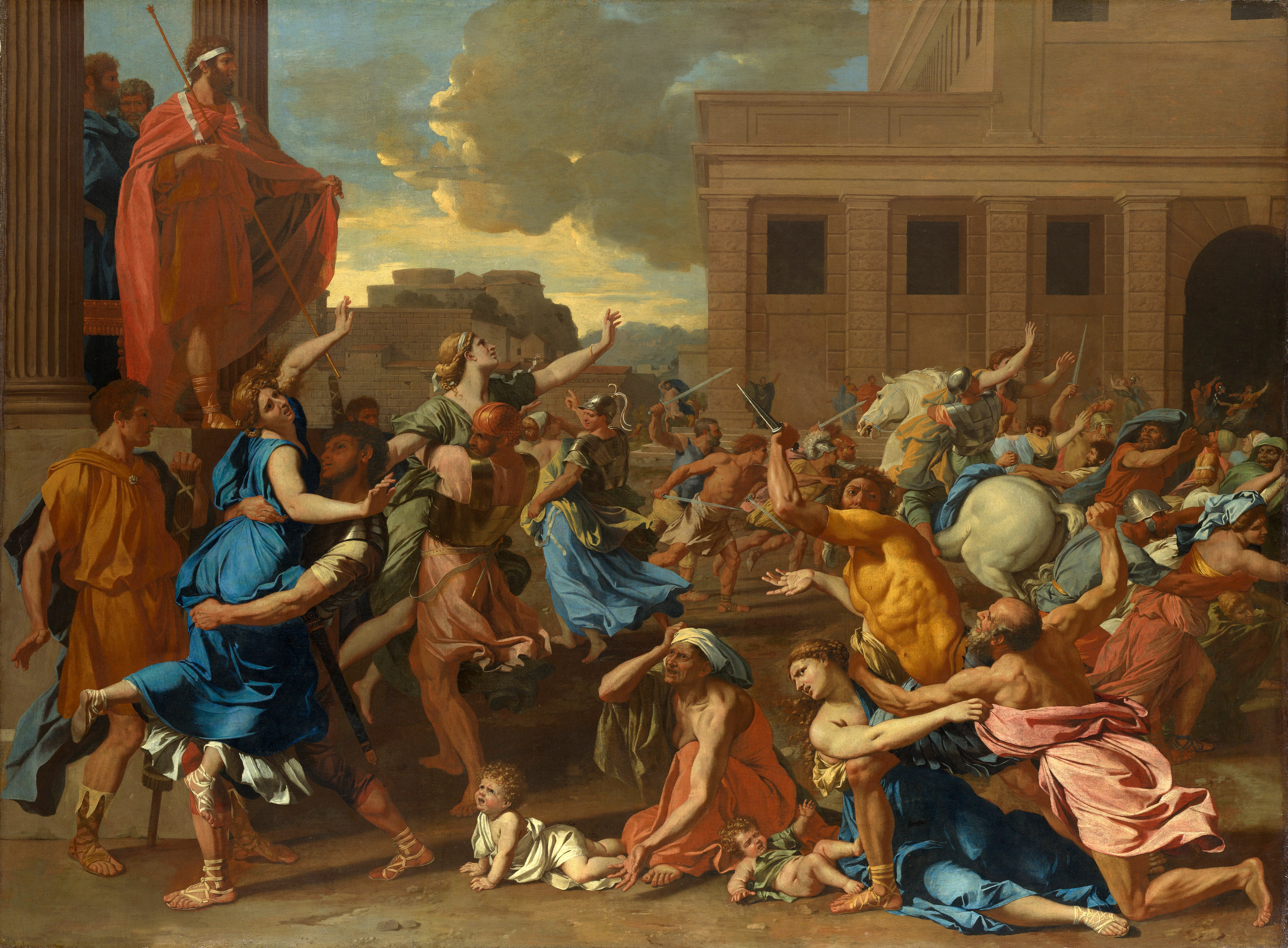
Nicolas Poussin, The Rape of the Sabine Women (1637) Metropolitan Museum of Art

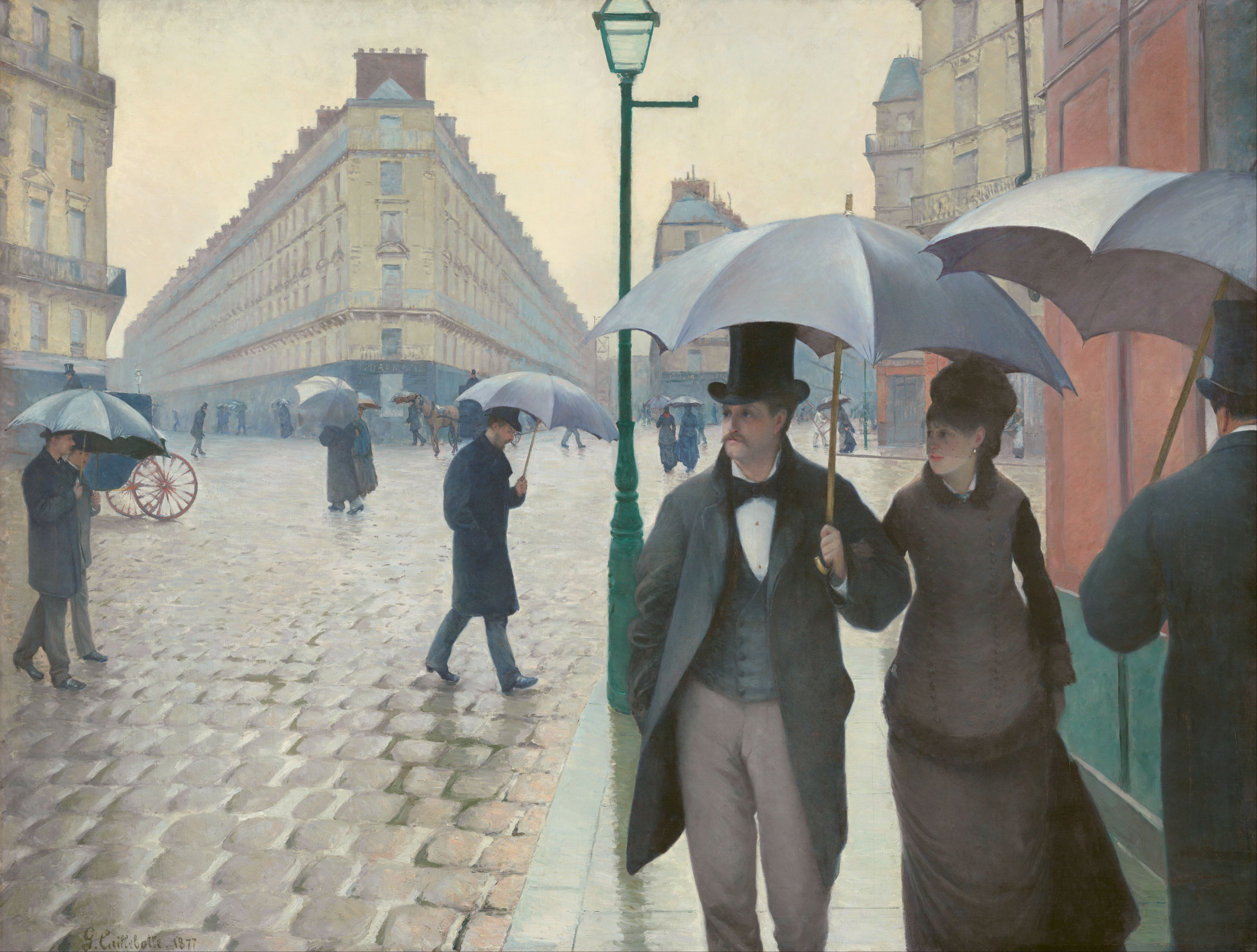
Gustave Caillebotte, Paris Street, Rainy Day (1877), Art Institute of Chicago

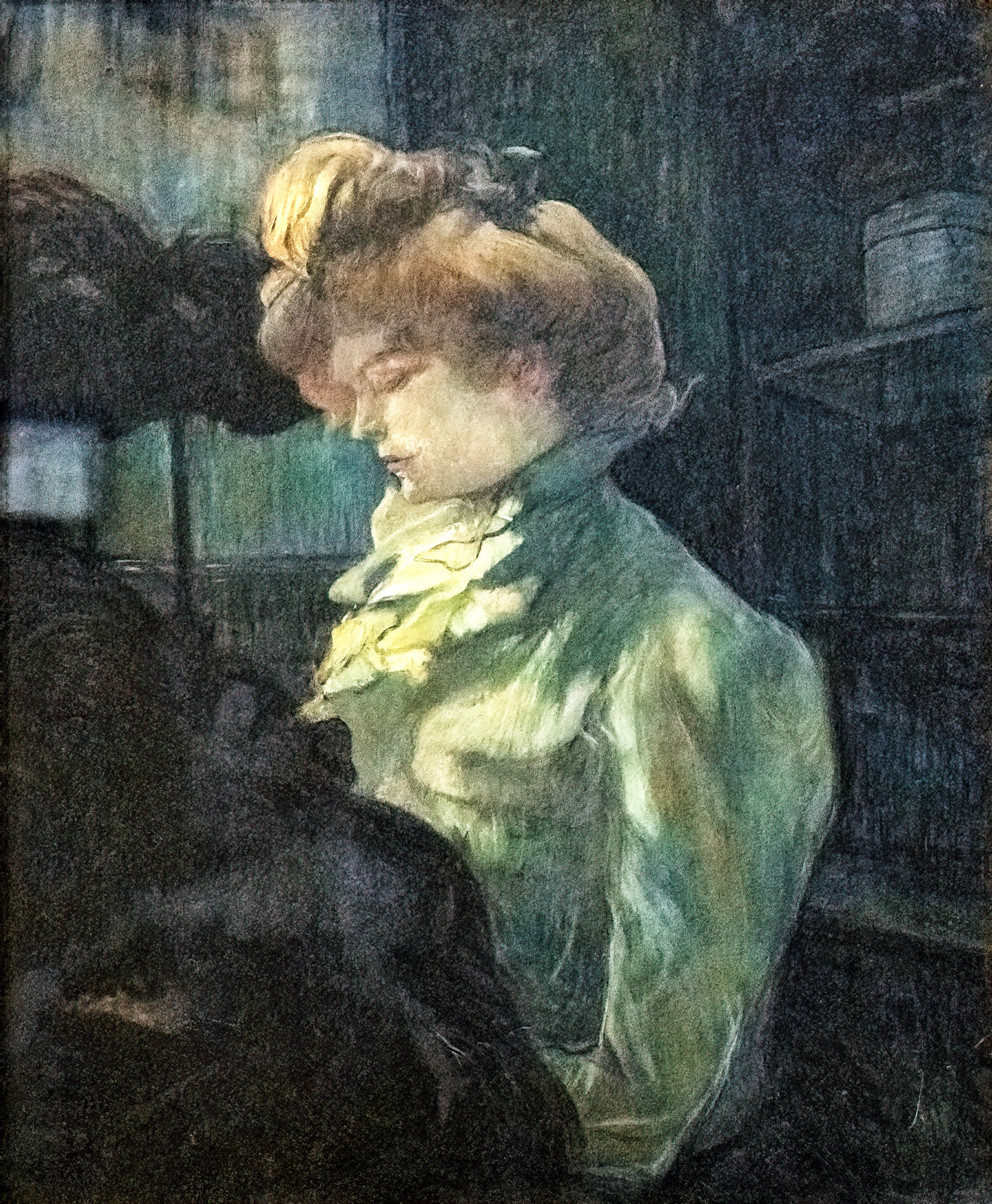
Henri de Toulouse-Lautrec, The Milliner (1900)

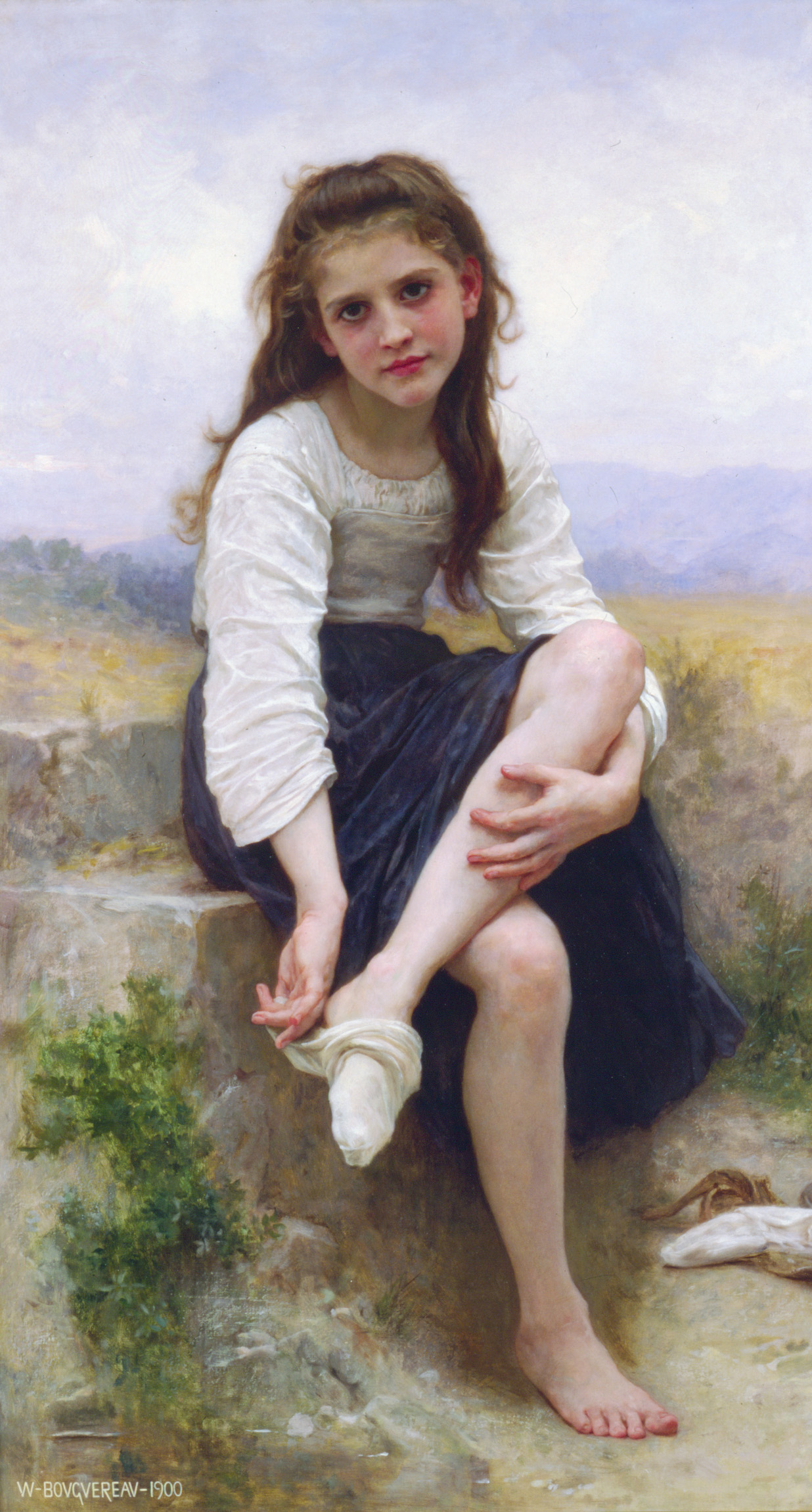
William-Adolphe Bouguereau, Before the Bath (1900)

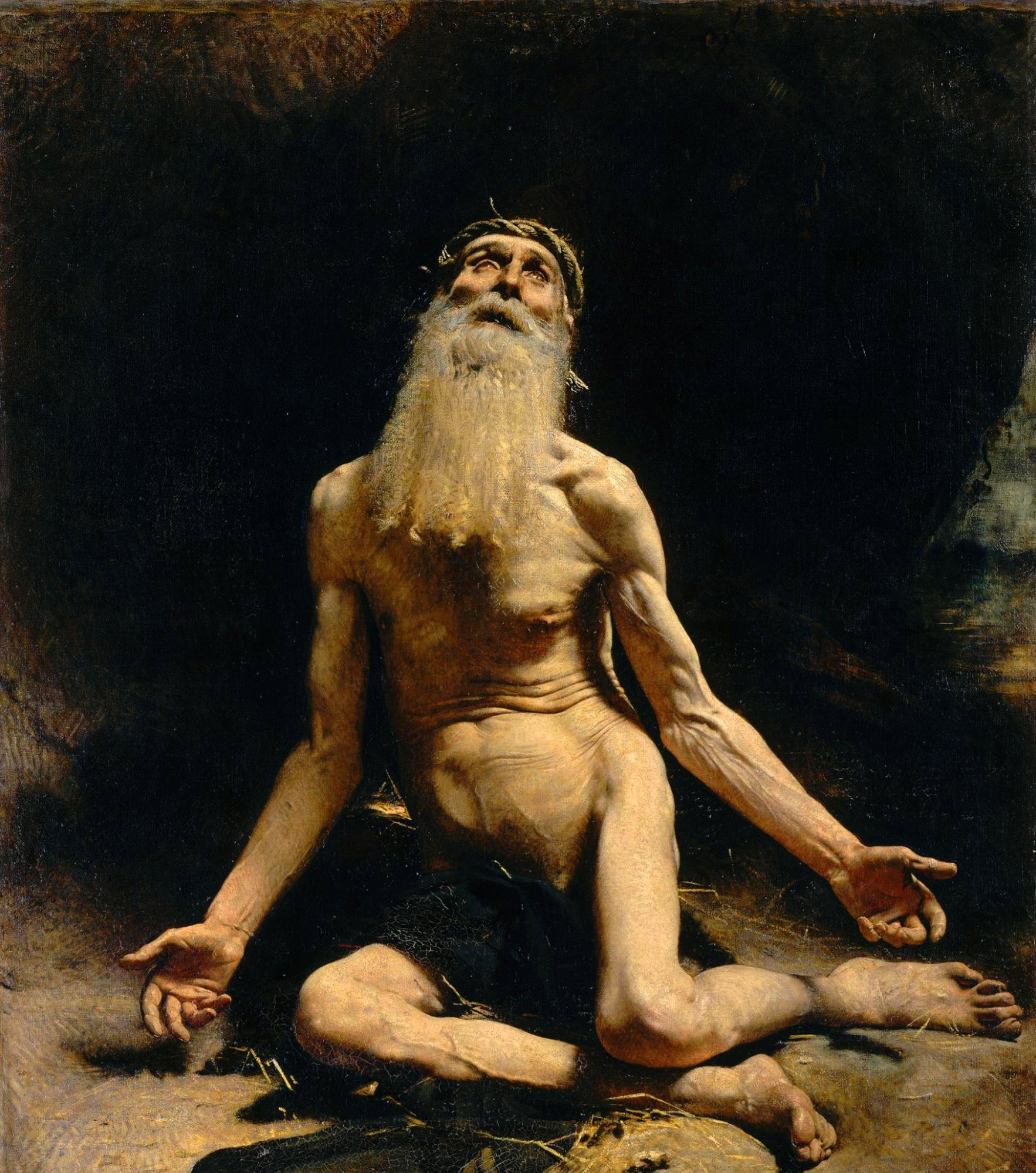
Léon Bonnat, Job (1880)

== See also ==
- Académie Colarossi
- Académie Delécluse
- Académie Julian
- Académie Vitti
- Art Renewal Center
- Art Students League of New York
- Eyebeam Art and Technology Center
- Hybrid image
- National Academy of Design
- New York Academy of Art
