= Charles Bargue =

French painter (1825–1883)

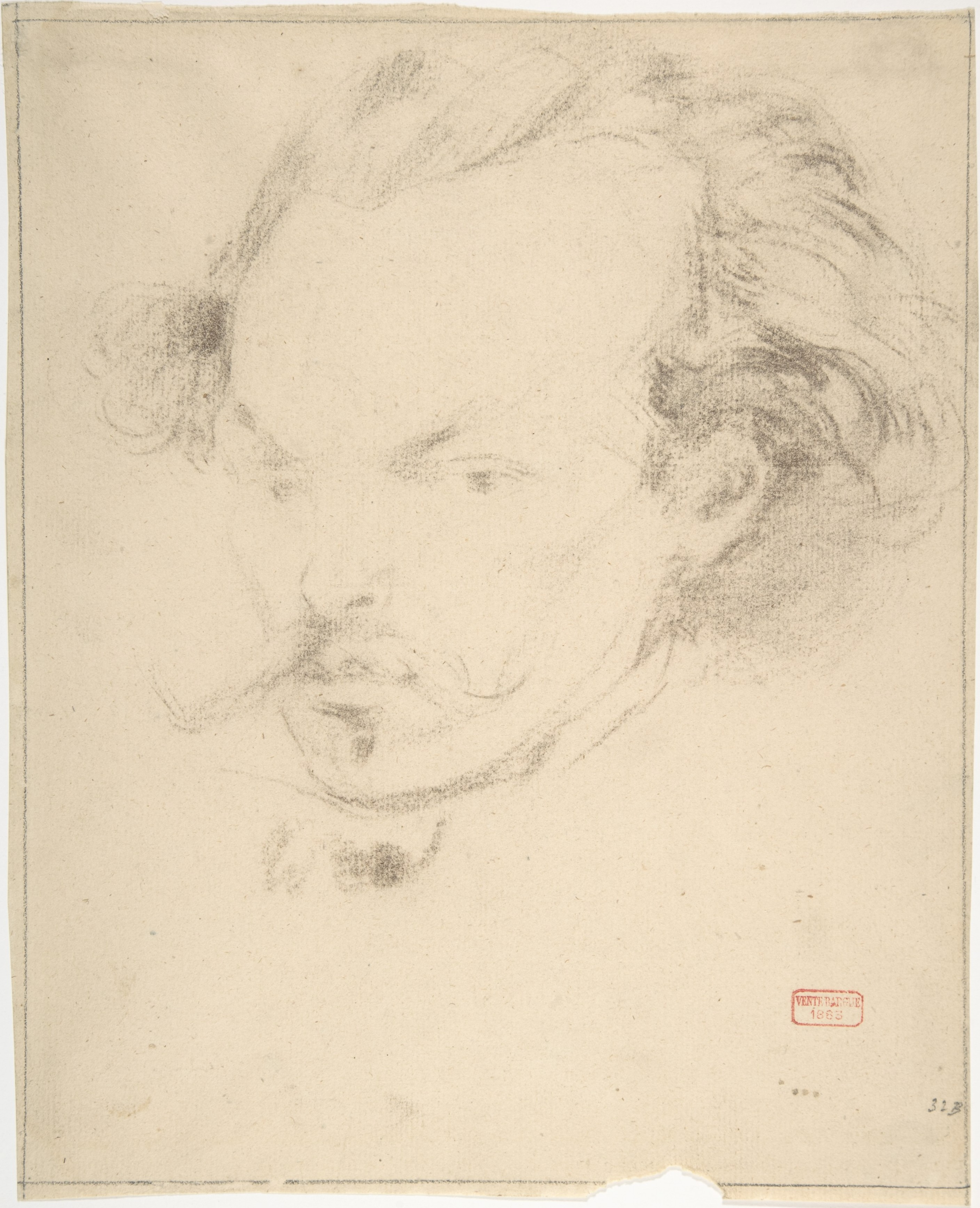
- Portrait of the Artist, 1850-1853
- Born: 31st March, 1825; France
- Died: 6th April, 1883; France
- Education: Jean-Léon Gérôme
- Known for: Cours de dessin, a classical drawing course
- Movement: Orientalist scenes, historical genre

Charles Bargue (Paris, c. 1825 - Paris, 1883) was a French painter and lithographer noted for devising an influential drawing course.

== Life and career ==
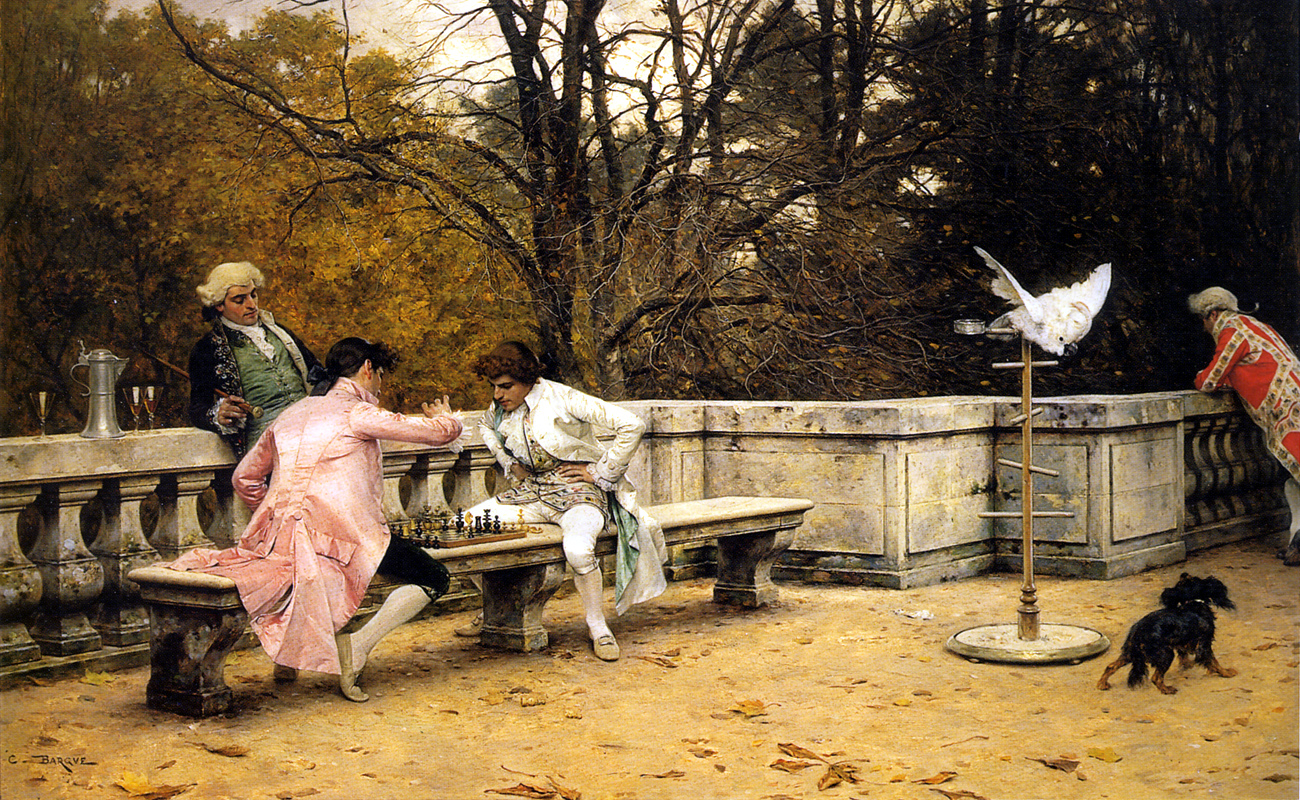
The Chess Game, by Charles Bargue

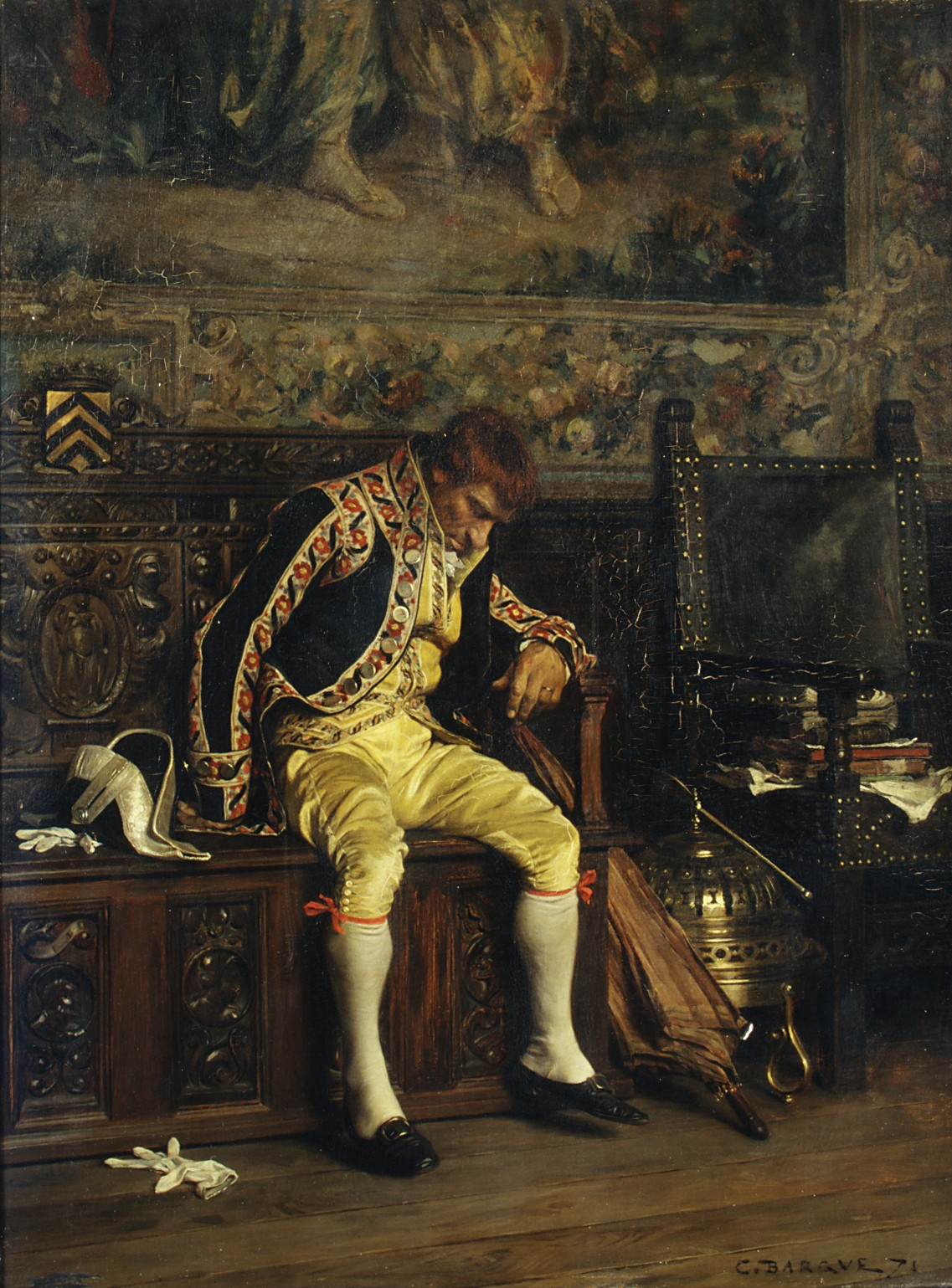
A Footman Sleeping, 1871. Metropolitan Museum of Art.

Bargue began his career as a lithographer, initially freelancing for the publisher F. Sinnet around 1847, and later joined the well-known art dealership Goupil & Cie circa 1858.

Bargue was a student of Jean-Léon Gérôme. Bargue worked closely with Gérôme and was influenced by his style, which included Orientalist scenes and historical genre. Bargue's last painting was completed by Gérôme and is now conserved in the Malden Public Library, Malden, Massachusetts, USA. He travelled extensively through North Africa, and the Balkans, during which time he executed many portraits of local people with meticulous detail.

In 1883, Bargue suffered a stroke along with a worsening of the mental health struggles he had long endured. He died a few months later in a Paris asylum.

== Charles Bargue Drawing Course ==
The Cours de dessin commonly called the Bargue Drawing Course was devised and published in the 1860s by Charles Bargue with the scholarly collaboration of Jean-Léon Gérôme and the publishing house Goupil & Cie. Although several sources contradict each other, the course was probably published between 1868 and 1873 by Goupil & Cie, comprised 197 lithographs printed as individual sheets. The course was intended to guide students from plaster casts (Part I - published in 1868), to the study of great master drawings (Part II - published in 1870), and finally to drawing from the living model (Part III - published in 1873). The Charles Bargue Drawing Course is used by many academies and ateliers which focus on Classical Realism. Among the artists whose work is based on the study of Bargue's plate work are Pablo Picasso and Vincent van Gogh, who copied the complete set in 1880/1881, and again in 1890. Van Gogh wrote sixteen letters to his brother Theo in which he discusses Charles Bargue's Cours de dessin (Drawing Course), even attributing his newfound ability to draw what he previously could not to this course.

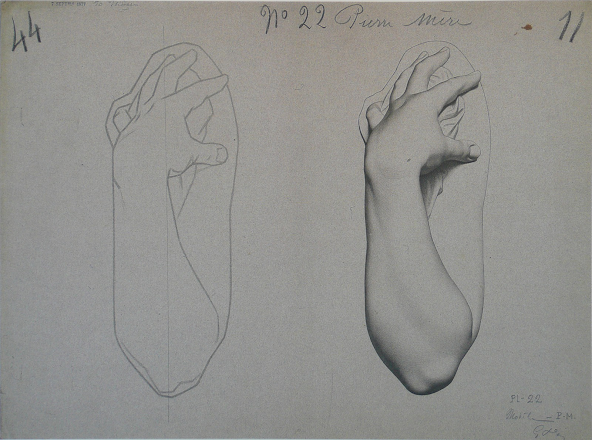
Twenty-second plate of Charles Bargue's Drawing Course, from a total of 197.

“The careful study, the constant and repeated drawing of Bargue’s Exercices au fusain has given me more insight into figure drawing. I’ve learned to measure and to see and to attempt the broad outlines, etc. So that what used to seem to me desperately impossible is now gradually becoming possible, thank God.” — Van Gogh, Letter to Theo 172, September 1881.

The Bargue Course was produced as a set of individual lithographic plates intended as precise models for students to copy. This method has been resurrected in several contemporary ateliers aiming at training artists on realist drawing, following the only known surviving complete set kept in the National Art Library of the Victoria and Albert Museum, in London. In 1991 two further complete sets were made public as a result of the founding of the Musée Coupil in Bordeaux. Although the course was not originally intended to be executed using the sight-size method, it was eventually conflated with that technique, as the two approaches proved to be mutually beneficial when used together.

== Work ==
Publication

- Charles Bargue with the collaboration of Jean-Léon Gérôme, Charles Bargue Drawing Course, 1866.

Paintings

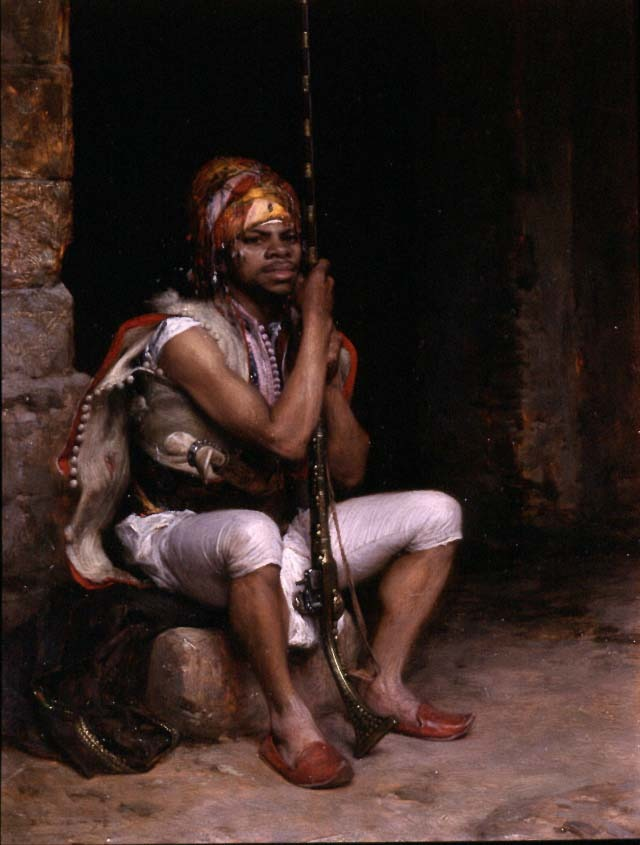
The Sentinel, 1872

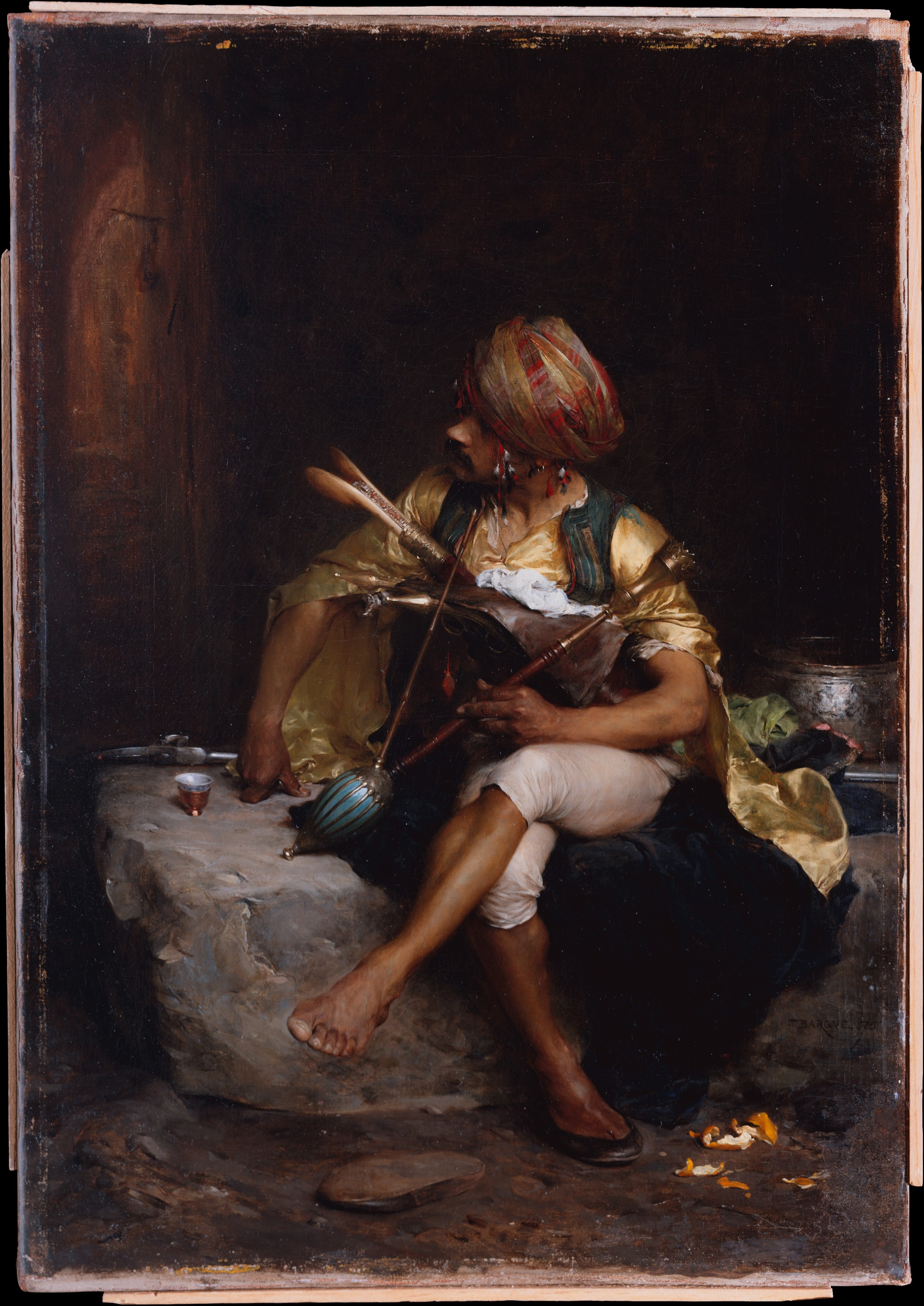
A Bashi-Bazouk, 1875

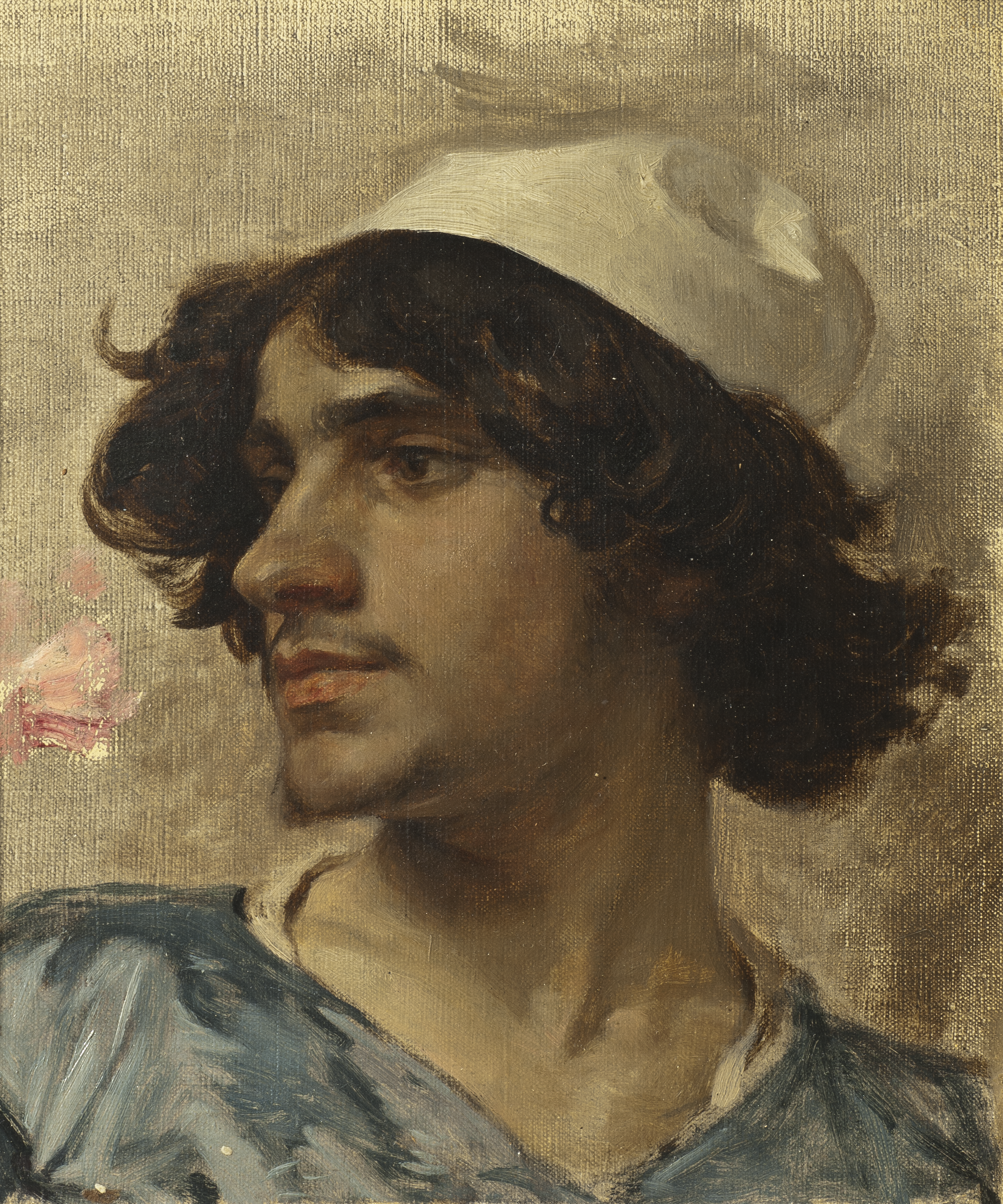
Head of Young man, (Study) ca. 1876

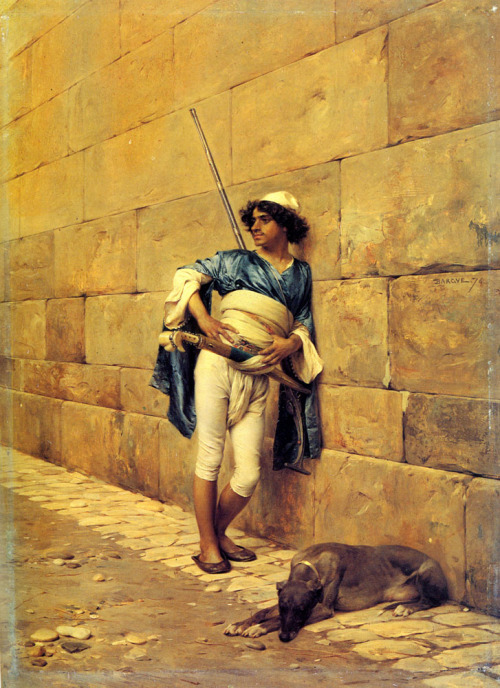
The Albanian Sentinel, 1876

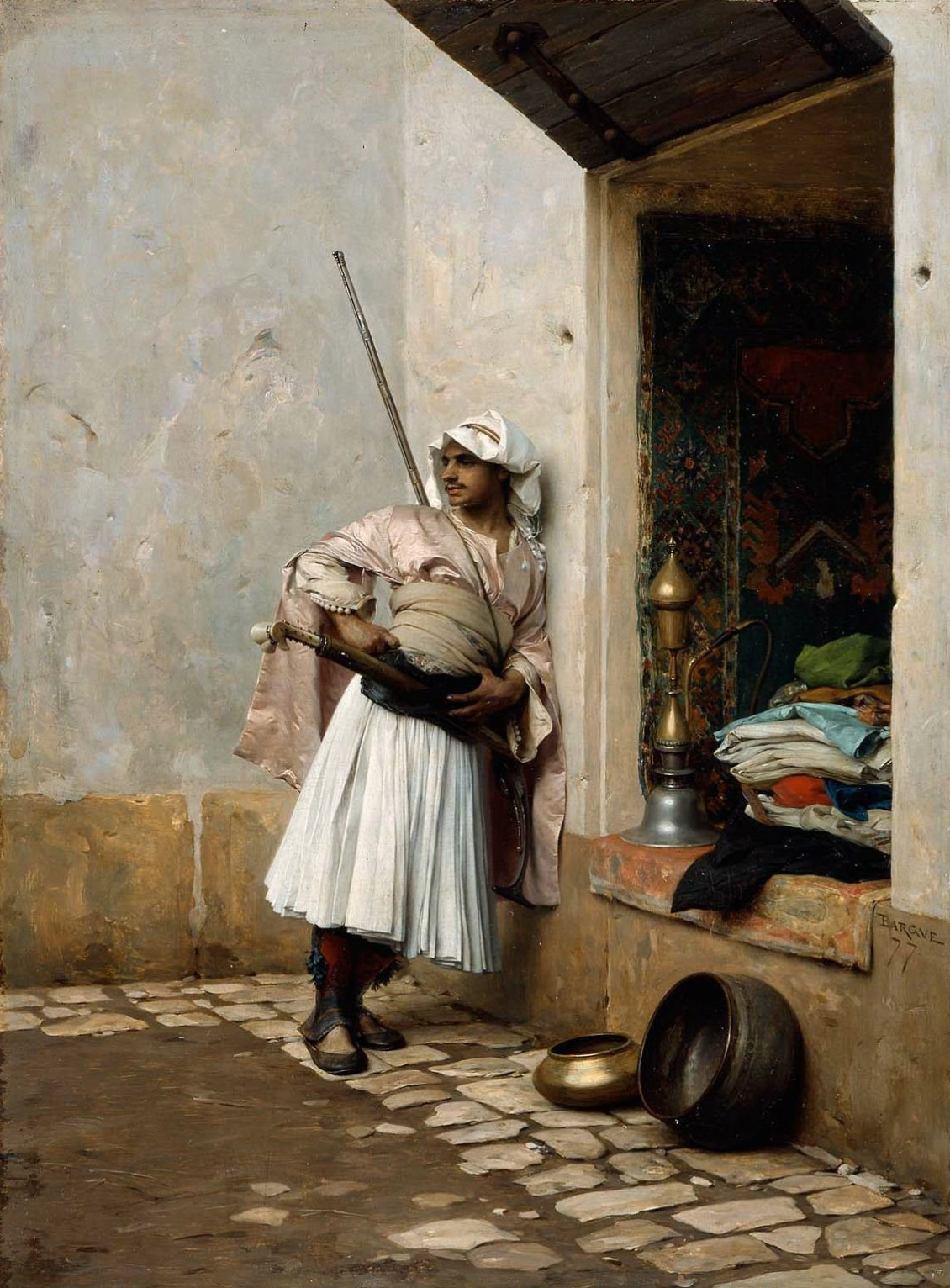
The Albanian Sentinel in Cairo, 1877

== See also ==
- List of Orientalist artists
- Orientalism
