= The Hound of Heaven =

1890 poem written by Francis Thompson

- by Francis Thompson
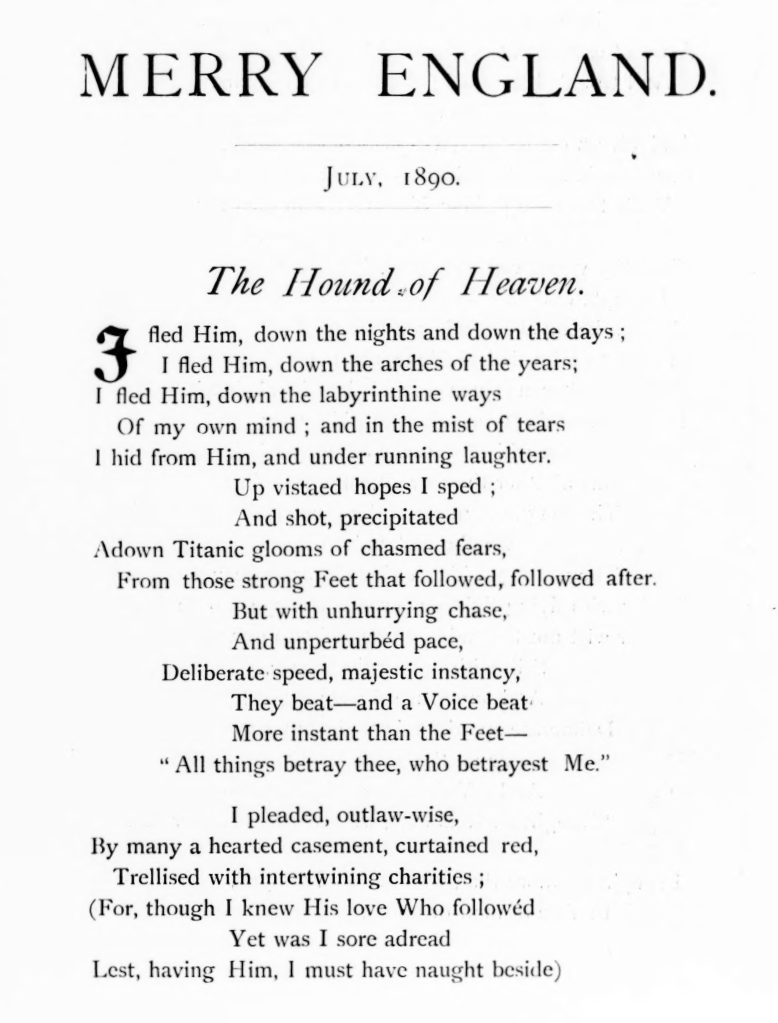
- First page of original printing
- First published in: Merry England
- Country: England
- Language: English
- Subject: the pursuit of the human soul by God's love
- Genre(s): mystical, devotional
- Form: ode
- Publication date: 1890-07
- Metre: irregular

Full text
- The Hound of Heaven at Wikisource

"The Hound of Heaven" is a 182-line poem written by English poet Francis Thompson (1859–1907). The poem became famous and was the source of much of Thompson's posthumous reputation. It was first printed in 1890 in the periodical Merry England, later to appear in Thompson's first volume of poems in 1893. It was included in the Oxford Book of English Mystical Verse (1917).

== Form and theme ==
The poem is an ode, and its subject is the pursuit of the human soul by God's love—a theme also found in the devotional poetry of George Herbert and Henry Vaughan. Moody and Lovett point out that Thompson's use of free and varied line lengths and irregular rhythms reflect the panicked retreat of the soul, while the structured, often recurring refrain suggests the inexorable pursuit as it comes ever closer.

The Jesuit J.F.X. O'Conor remarks of the Christian themes of the poem that,

"The name is strange. It startles one at first. It is so bold, so new, so fearless. It does not attract, rather the reverse. But when one reads the poem this strangeness disappears. The meaning is understood. As the hound follows the hare, never ceasing in its running, ever drawing nearer in the chase, with unhurrying and unperturbed pace, so does God follow the fleeing soul by His Divine grace. And though in sin or in human love, away from God it seeks to hide itself, Divine grace follows after, unwearyingly follows ever after, till the soul feels its pressure forcing it to turn to Him alone in that never ending pursuit."

== Musical settings ==
- William Henry Harris The Hound of Heaven (1919)
- Humphrey John Stewart The Hound of Heaven (1924)
- Miriam Gideon The Hound of Heaven (1945)
- Maurice Jacobson The Hound of Heaven (1953)
- Howard Blake Benedictus (1980)
- Ronald Corp The Hound of Heaven (2009)

== Influence ==
- Actor Dean Jones used the line "Under Running Laughter" from the first stanza as the title of his memoir.
- Thompson's work was praised by G. K. Chesterton, and it was also an influence on J. R. R. Tolkien, who presented a paper on Thompson in 1914.
- In 1933, Halliday Sutherland used a phrase from the second line of the poem as the title of his best-selling autobiography, The Arches of the Years.
- In 1935, Paramahansa Yogananda, an Indian spiritual master, included "The Hound of Heaven" in one of his phonographic albums, Songs of My Heart. Today, his organization, Self-Realization Fellowship, offers this album in the form of a CD. Kamala Silva, a purported direct disciple of Paramahansa Yogananda, received the gift of a printing of the "Hound of Heaven" from Yogananda and he also recited it for her.
- A short passage from the poem appears in chapter four of Daphne du Maurier's Rebecca (1938).
- "The Hound of Heaven" inspired Norwegian composer Fartein Valen (1887–1952) to compose his Piano Sonata No. 2, Op. 38 (1941). The sonata's three movements reflect different parts of Thompson's poem. The piece has been recorded by Glenn Gould.
- Thompson's poem is mentioned and quoted in Robert Frost's 1947 play A Masque of Mercy.
- "The Hound of Heaven" was used as an example of the hero's "refusal of the call" to adventure in Joseph Campbell's book, The Hero with a Thousand Faces (1949)
- In 1955, a love letter from Suzanne Kempe to her philosophy lecturer, Sydney Sparkes Orr, quotes excerpts from the poem. Their affair was later brought to trial in Tasmania.
- Thompson's poem is the source of the phrase, "with all deliberate speed," used by the Supreme Court in Brown II (1955), the remedy phase of the famous decision on school desegregation.
- Thompson's poem was the inspiration for a series of 23 paintings by the American painter R. H. Ives Gammell (1893–1981), A Pictorial Sequence Painted by R. H. Ives Gammell Based on The Hound of Heaven, which was in planning by 1941 and completed in 1956. A reading of The Psychology of the Unconscious by C. G. Jung showed Gammell a way in which he might give visual form to Thompson's poem.
- The poem is referenced in chapter 12 of the 1963 novel Hopscotch by Julio Cortázar, together with the recurring phrase "I fled Him".
- The last stanza is included by Elizabeth Goudge in her anthology of poems, hymns, prayers and reflections A Book of Comfort, Part III "The Comfort of Faith": "The Finding" (1964).
- "The Hound of Heaven" is the fifth chapter in Robert L. Short's 1965 book The Gospel According to Peanuts where he describes Snoopy as a "little Christ" carrying out "Christ's ambivalent work of humbling the exalted and exalting the humble."
- In A. J. Cronin's novel, A Pocketful of Rye (1969), the protagonist Carroll reads the poem as a young man, forgets it, and suffers from a recurring nightmare that finally leads to his conversion.
- In 1970, Canadian artist William Kurelek used lines from "The Hound of Heaven" as titles for his "Nature, Poor Stepdame, A Series of Sixteen Farm Paintings"
- In 1975 "The Hound of Heaven" was mentioned in the suicide note of George R. Price, a geneticist who pioneered the evolutionary theory of altruism and suicide (among other things), before becoming a committed Christian and giving away all his possessions to the poor.
- The Christian alternative rock band Daniel Amos wrote a song titled Hound of Heaven on their 1978 album Horrendous Disc that is based on the Thompson poem.
- Contemporary Christian music artist Michael Card also wrote and recorded a song called "Hound of Heaven" based on Thompson's poem for his 1981 debut album First Light.
- Lines from the poem are recited between the discussion during the last scene in "The last enemy", which is the 2nd episode, 3rd season of Inspector Morse (1989).
- In 2001 Ken Bruen cites the poem admiringly in his novel The Guards.
- In 2002, Katherine A. Powers, literary columnist for the Boston Globe, called Hound of Heaven "perhaps the most beloved and ubiquitously taught poem among American Catholics for over half a century".
- "The Hound of Heaven" is the first chapter in John Stott's book Why I am a Christian (2003) in which he confesses that he is a Christian not because of the influence of his parents and teachers, nor to his own personal decision, but to being relentlessly pursued by 'the Hound of Heaven', that is, Jesus Christ himself.
- The poem is mentioned and lines quoted in the novel Escape from Hell (2009) by Larry Niven and Jerry Pournelle
- The main character is reading a book by this name in the first episode of the Irish TV series Jack Taylor.
- In describing her journey from atheism and agnosticism to devout Christianity, political commentator Kirsten Powers said, "The Hound of Heaven had pursued me and caught me...."
- In 2014, N. D. Wilson wrote and directed a short film based upon the poem, titled "The Hound of Heaven".
- In April 2020, in an interview with Phoebe Waller-Bridge on his show The Late Show with Stephen Colbert, Stephen Colbert told her that he thought the fox that appeared in her series Fleabag was the Hound of Heaven, which appeared to astound and delight Waller-Bridge.
- Five lines from the poem were used in a 1989 episode of Inspector Morse, The Last Enemy.
  - "...My mangled youth lies dead beneath the heap. / My days have crackled and gone up in smoke, / Have puffed and burst as sun-starts on a stream. / Yea, faileth now even dream / The dreamer, and the lute the lutanist...."
