= D. Jeffrey Mims =

American painter (born 1954)

- Born: April 28, 1954 (age 72); North Carolina, United States
- Known for: Mural Painting
- Movement: Classical Realism

D. Jeffrey Mims (born April 28, 1954) is a painter, educator, lecturer, and muralist working as a classical realist.

== Biography ==
Mims attended the Rhode Island School of Design (1972–1973) and the Pennsylvania Academy of the Fine Arts (1973–1976). In 1976, he received an Elizabeth Greenshields Foundation grant to support his independent study in the museums of England, France, and Italy. In 1981, he returned to Florence, Italy where he studied with the American painter Benjamin F. Long and received critiques from Long's Italian mentor, Pietro Annigoni.

== Academy ==
D. Jeffrey Mims is the founder and director of the Academy of Classical Design in Southern Pines, North Carolina. The Academy is a school of fine art with an emphasis on traditional mural painting and architectural decoration. The school began as Mims Studios in 2000 and was re-structured in 2011 as the Academy of Classical Design. As of 2023, the Academy will be temporarily closed for a period of two years to allow for the completion of the painted ceiling decorations.

== Selected writings ==
- 2016 "Creating a Classical Academy" Traditional Building Magazine. April 2016.
- 2010 "Caput Mundi (Capital of the World)" Fine Art Connoisseur. July 2010. pp. 41–44
- 2006 "Slow Painting / A Deliberate Renaissance" Oglethorpe University Museum, Atlanta, Georgia—catalogue with contributed essay.

== Bibliography ==
- Figueroa, Raphael, "Peter and John Heal a Man Who Was Lame, Magic City Religion, November 22, 2020.
- D. Jeffrey Mims, "Caput Mundi (Capital of the World)", Fine Art Connoisseur, August 2010, vol. 7, i . 4, pp. 41–44, and cover illustration.
- Peter Bougie, "Intuition: An Interview with D. Jeffrey Mims," Classical Realism Journal, vol.VII, i .1, pp. 10–19, 10-19 illustration.
- Jerry Cullum, "Realism Lives In Contemporary Pieces," The Atlanta Journal-Constitution, Friday, November 10, 1995, Section P pp. 1, 12 illustration.
- Anderson, Kurt, "An Interview with D. Jeffrey Mims", Classical Realism Quarterly, May 16, 1990, pp. 12–15, 20-21 illustration.
- Keough, Patrick, "Reinventing Classical Realism", The Arts Journal, May 1990 pp. 14–15 illustration.
- Bretzius, Hunter, "Renaissance Man", Sun Journal, Thursday, April 5, 1990, pp. 1C-2 illustration.
- Nunnelley, William A., "Painting in the Old Way", Seasons, Fall 1988 pp. 8–9 illustration.
- Reeves, Garland, "Jeffrey Mims: An Artist Who Takes Long View of Things", The Birmingham News, Sunday August 21, 1988 p. 1E-7 illustration.
- Lauder, Val, "The Southern Artists", Southern Accents, Nov.-Dec. 1986 pp. 120–123, 146 illustration.
- Coles, William A., "D. Jeffrey Mims: A Painter's Odyssey", American Artist, October 1985 pp. 36–40, 78-82 illustration.
