= Samizu Matsuki =

Japanese artist (1936–2018)

Samizu Matsuki (March 16, 1936 – August 4, 2018) was a Japanese artist and educator.

She won the Gold Medal at the 1970 First New York International Art Show, the Grand Prix at the 1971 Locust Valley Art Show on Long Island, New York, and the Award of Excellence at the Abraham & Straus-Hempstead Art Show, "Long Island Art '74" for her explorations of Classical Realism. Matsuki was the first woman member of the Salmagundi Club.

== Biography ==
Matsuki was born March 16, 1936 in Uryū, Hokkaidō, Japan, to educators Satoru and Masue Matsuki. Her father Satoru's opposition to Japan's involvement in World War II led to official reprisals forcing him into hiding and his family shuttled from relative to relative in Iburi sub-Prefecture for most of the war. After Japan's surrender, Satoru's known anti-war sentiments resulted in his being given an education leadership post, he sought to apply the innovations of American educator Ruth Benedict and philosopher John Dewey to the Japanese educational system. The family lived in a number of locations on Hokkaidō, finally the resort city Noboribetsu, famed for its scenery and hot springs. Matsuki's lineal ancestors had moved to southern Hokkaidō in the late 19th century.

Matsuki was awarded a scholarship to the Women's College of Fine Arts' Faculty of Western Painting (now known as Joshibi University of Art and Design), Tokyo. She graduated in 1958 with a Bachelor of Arts degree. Her graduation work “Daphne” (oil, approximately 4' by 5'), is in the collection of the Noboribetsu Cultural Center, Hokkaidō, Japan. The painting suffered some notoriety for its sensuality; briefly pulled from view, it mysteriously reappeared on the display wall the next morning. Her two teaching jobs, one at an elementary school in Itabashi Precinct in 1959, the other at Shimura Daisan Junior High School in Tokyo in 1960, illuminated for her the malleability of children per the call of art critic and historian Herbert Read for originality and creativity.

She was an active member of the Tokyo Teachers Union. In 1960 the Teachers Union Monthly published a presentation and lecture Matsuki gave in the Bunkyo Precinct in Tokyo, where, speaking on behalf of the teachers of the more working class Itabashi precinct, she called for adoption throughout the Japanese educational system of the education principles laid out by Read in his book Education Through Art.

In 1961 Matsuki married American airman Herman Berry at the American Embassy in Tokyo. They left Japan in 1962 and for the next seven years lived at airbases in Europe and the United States. When her husband was sent to Pakistan, Matsuki spent eighteen months with Berry's relatives, where she painted portraits of residents of their remote Appalachian mountain community in western North Carolina.

Upon his return, they spent four years at the Spangdahlem Air Base in Germany. During this period (1964 to 1968), Matsuki visited Rome and painted commissioned portraits for five Air Force officers and their wives, and was commissioned by the Officers Club of the 49th Tactical Squadron to paint a portrait of the recently deceased USAF fighter ace Richard Bong.

Matsuki became increasingly disillusioned with her marriage partner. They next were living at Calumet Air Force Station in northern Michigan. Uterine cancer eruptionn caused her to get a hysterectomy at age 32. In October of 1969 they were divorced She stayed at the isolated Calumet airbase through to completion of a portrait of the Base Commander. Then departed

The spent that summer in Albany, Oregon, where she submitted the winning design for the logo of the 1969 Albany Jaycees Timber Carnival. This being the carnival's 25th anniversary, the theme was "passing the torch." Matsuki's drawing, shown here on the carnival's pinback button, depicts a young logger with hardhat and chainsaw and an elderly logger with wool cap and axe, standing behind a short bark-covered log. The young logger has an arm around the shoulder of his elder in a comradely fashion.

Informed that six years would pass before she could be declared free of cancer, in 1970 she plunged into the New York fine arts cultural scene. By 1975 her explorations of Classical Realism had won her a gold medal at the 1970 First New York International Art Show, membership as one of the first woman artists in the hitherto men-only New York art club, the Salmagundi Club, the Grand Prix at the 1971 Locust Valley Art Show on Long Island, New York, and the Award of Excellence at the 1974 Abraham & Straus-Hempstead Art Show, "Long Island Art '74".

Becoming less concerned about a resurgence of cancer, Matsuki, who'd become known as "the shark" by friends for her seemingly never slowing down, then worked at a more leisurely pace and stopped entering competitions. She returned to Oregon in 1980, where she taught at the Albany Art Center, worked on a baccalaureate at Oregon State University in nearby Corvallis, employed by the university as a janitor, and created additional drawn works. During a brief sojourn in California, Matsuki painted a mural at a health spa in Isla Vista.

In 1985, Matsuki met Earth First! activist Ron Huber in Corvallis, Oregon. Several months later, she drew the cover art for the August 1985 edition of the Earth First! Journal. The drawing featured Huber treesitting in an old growth Douglas fir, confronted by two Linn County sheriff's deputies elevated to him by a crane.

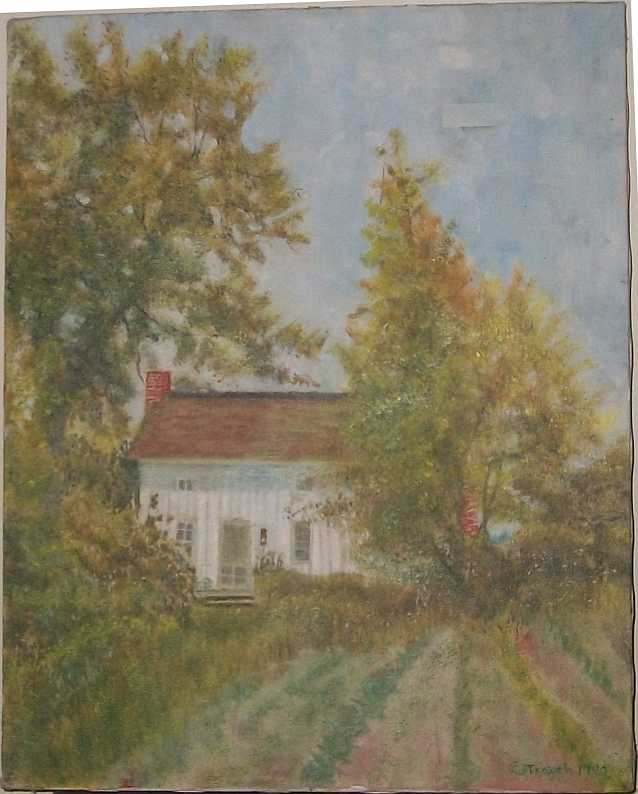
Samizu Matsuki's Maryland farmhouse, by artist Charles Trauth

Matsuki married Huber in 1987. They moved to Cheverly, Maryland in 1988, then to Rockland, Maine in 1992. Neurological problems that flared up in 1991 while living in a farmhouse in Calvert County, Maryland led to a reduction in Matsuki's painting and drawing efforts for more than a decade. In 2006 Matsuki underwent a physical and neurological rehabilitation regimen. In 2010 she was diagnosed with chronic Lyme disease, stemming from as far back as 1991.

On August 4, 2018, Matsuki died of cancer at her Rockland home.

Two of her works,Ah... and A Celebrator are owned by collector Cristina Chan Johnston of Huntingtown, Maryland.

== Career ==
One of the first women admitted to membership in the prestigious Salmagundi Club in New York City since its founding in 1871. Matsuki's winning entries at two major New York art shows in 1970 helped rekindle enthusiasm for realistic painting among American artists.

In 1970, Matsuki's painting "Triumphant Return" earned her a Gold Medal at the First New York International Art Show (her first entry in open competition). Oil on canvas, 50" by 60") Triumphant Return reveals the thousand-yard stare of air force veteran Andrew Delaney, musing among his childhood relics in the Long Island enclave Rockville Center.

In 1974 she won the Grand Prix at the 1974 Locust Valley Art Show, Long Island, New York for her painting allegorizing the recent tank war in the Middle East "ah!".

According to Matsuki her works "integrate the classic Western method of painting with the theoretical propriety of Contemporary Art, including the colour theory of pointillism, multiple focal points of the Cubists, Modiglianni's deformations; Buffe's “Ideosyncracyism" Picasso’s dislocation of perspective, and the dislocation of time and or space of Egyptian wall painting.

Matsuki's "Magical Realism" as she dubbed her painting style, pays close attention to fine detail, with subtly impossible perspectives, triggering an emotional charge to the works' subject matters.

"Triumphant Return" (1970, oil on canvas, 50" by 60") reveals the thousand-yard stare of air force veteran Andrew Delaney, musing among his childhood relics in the Long Island enclave Rockville Center.

Matsuki describes the purposes and techniques involved in the painting of Triumphant Return:

The painting “Triumphant Return” was done in the epoch where the Vietnam War was nearing its zenith. The most vocal of all sentiments was that of 'anti-war'. The most immediate experience which inspired my theme was the one where I, by chance, attended the yearly ceremony of the local American Legion, Long Island New York, in which the entire procession was conducted seemingly most diffident and eventlessly hastened up way. The National Anthem was sung in hushed voices in disarray. The white rectangular military caps looked as forlorn as the brown of deserted piers.

There was something moved me deep enough to plunge into my first major work, which the production of demanded total concentration for four months working every night (I painted during night.) Except for Saturday. I went to the movies during the day, to the bar at night for distraction.

Preparation of painting surface was done by mixture of opaque and transparent regular oil color pigments produced by Windsor and Newton and Grumbacher which eventually took the hue of reddish dark brown. I used a commercially prepared cotton small grain canvas. So far acceptable for my rendition of details. On this prepared surface, of approximately 1~2 mm thickness of the pigment after sufficient dryness was achieved, I first transferred the final sketch of the theme using medium strength charcoal of commercial origin.

Approximately 3 or 4 coats of a commercial brand fixative were applied before the execution of final underdrawing (cartoon) by oil colour, mixture of burnt umber and Prussian blue in various composition ratio for the purpose of shortening drying period, with pure turpentine, as medium.

When the under-drawing was sufficiently dry, therefore accepting overlapping pigment application without causing surface damage, I began first application of painting, molding. Medium: pure turpentine plus linseed oil. Ratio, approximately 2 turp/1 linseed. Pigments used were burnt umber, optional Prussian blue and yellow ochre (in later paintings I changed this colour to Naples yellow, because of its larger covering strength and fast drying speed.)

After adequate surface dryness of the so far monochromatic sketched first coat (at this level the entire pictorial plane was equally developed), the second coat was applied to achieve chromatic “mapping” according to the psychological connotation and aesthetic atmosphere desired by the theme.

In this case, I began by using opaque-est possible pigments for the purpose of similar strength such as yellow ochre, cobalt blue, burnt sienna etc, and quick drying properties like umbers, prussian blue, naples yellow mixed by turp and linseed with aforementioned concoction ratio. At this stage the entire effect of the painting still presents monochromatic, relief-like quality, although proper hues were ascribed to the major areas of the composition. I call it “the view at dusk” for its similarity in chromatic effects.

At this stage the painting surface began to appear “realistic.” Since the canvas dimensions of “Triumphant Return” is rather large, 50" by 60", the earlier applications became dry enough to accept further application by the time this coast was finished.

Once this stage is achieved, real part of “painting” begins: rendering of the objects with utmost objective fidelity. The method I used for this purpose was glazing (thin application of transparent pigment) techniques employing pigments of high transparency such as alizarin crimson, ultramarine, prussian blue, verdian green, chrome yellow, aureolin, zinc white, ivory black, etc.

I found later on that the family of “Thalo” had good property for glazing. Especially thalo violet was intriguing in its chameleon-like adaptation to the underlying hues. With same pigment, thalo violet, one can develop several nuances upon surfaces depending on the hues of previous application(s). Thalo family was considered by authority such as Ralph Meyer as comparatively safe but not time tested to the perfect desirability, which might take 500 years to complete. If the surface of “Triumphant Return” crumbles, then the Thalo family of pigments should be buried with it.

When the entire pictorial surface was covered and safely dried, I used larger brushes such as 1inch or 1 1/2 inch flat, sable and fanshaped and or pig hair brushes, employing “wash” technique which is similar to second coating, to go over the entire canvas in order to achieve thematic and pictorial unity*. This is the final stage of the painting. When the surface becomes adequately dry, regular application of 3~4 coat of “retouch” varnish (I use this frequently to bring out sunk-in colors) was given to the entire pictorial surface. The final varnish by finish varnish was applied much later. In fact, after the exhibitory entry to the 1st NY International Art Show had been over.

* Pictorial unity: In this case the term is used to connote all the executional aspects utilized for the purpose of constructing pictorial surface."

End of Matsuki's description of the painting of Triumphant Return. (Letter to Ronald Huber, March 24, 2007)

== Other works ==
Matsuki has painted and drawn more than 100 other works in oil on canvas, charcoal, pencil and pen.

In 1971, New York's towers have crumbled in her eerie work __opia, which truncated phrase is printed on a scrap of paper blowing past two women in the shattered landscape of the ruined city. The work took shape in her shocked reaction to discovering America's greatest city in decay, even fabled Harlem. Oil on canvas. Large size image of ___opia Audio recording: Samizu Matsuki describing this work(recorded April 18, 1989)

Also in 1971 Matsuki painted Barbara and the Fortune Teller in which a young woman who had fled bourgeois suburbia for Greenwich Village, now flees what she'd just learned from a swart gypsy in a hovel beneath a howling subway crossing. Oil on canvas. Large size image of Barbara and the Fortuneteller

In 1973, after a year in Japan, Matsuki returned to New York City. A newspaper photograph of a wrecked Egyptian tank—in the aftermath of the Yom Kippur War—became, in her 1974 oil painting Ah... a shattered, larger-than-life partly devoured lobster sprawling across bleak, ruffled newsprint. Oil on canvas. Ah... won the Award of Excellence at the Abraham & Straus-Hempstead Art Show, "Long Island Art '74".

According to Matsuki, her oil painting A Celebrator (Oil & canvas, 60"x 50") reflects the growing culture of detachment and narcissism that she saw enveloping America. Located, like Triumphal Return, in a basement, the painting-within-a-painting format, and the attention to detail of the figurines, the crystal, the scattered clothing, the carpet and hookah, the doubled image of an artillery shell recovered from the USS Maine, and the carefully impossible perspective make A Celebrator" one of her finest works. Large size image of A Celebrator

In the 1976 painting "Blue Ghost" Matsuki manifests a line in a Russian poem by Esunin. In that poem he said “Blue Ghost! Neither here nor there.” Matsuki describes her work Blue Ghost thus: "The painting depict some aspects of upper class bourgeois life which was then my environment. The mirror behind the central figure reflects finer things of the past. The left side of the painting represents the past, the center is the present, while the right side and the bottom, the future. The giant compass divides things of the past from those of the future. Through the arch one sees the debris of civilization."

"I painted Blue Ghost first in only two colors: titanium white and Payne’s gray. (I applied color afterward by method of glazing.) I found advantage in monochrome painting, freeing me from having to consider problems of matching shades of color. This gave me a perfect stage for freely developing image directly on the canvas."
