= Atelier Studio Program of Fine Arts =

The Atelier Studio Program of Fine Arts is a studio school of drawing and painting established in 1969 as Atelier Lack by Minnesota artist Richard F. Lack. It was incorporated as a non-profit corporation in 1971. Richard Lack had studied with Boston artist, R. H. Ives Gammell, in the 1950s. In 1967 Lack had written "On the Training of Painters," an examination of the training of painters throughout the history of Western art, and his judgment about the superiority of the atelier, or studio system. The first years of the school were helped by three grants from The Elizabeth T. Greenshields Memorial Foundation in Montreal, Canada, “to help initiate an atelier for the purpose of training young students in the traditional craft of painting...”

== Locations ==
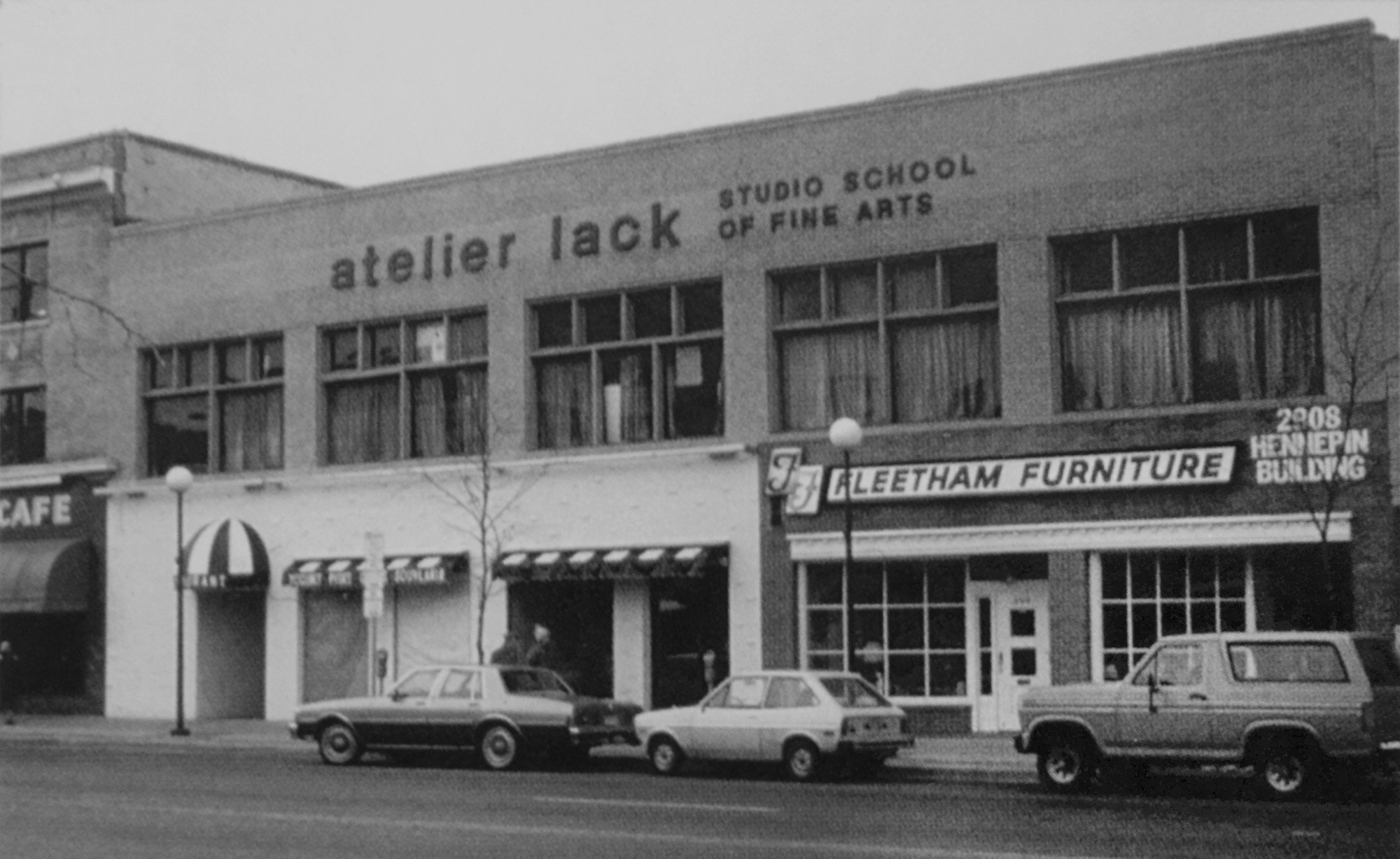
Atelier Lack's final Hennepin Avenue location.

Atelier Lack was first located in four small rooms on the second floor of a building on the northeast corner of Nicollet and Lake Street in Minneapolis. After two years it relocated to a large room on the third floor of a building on Hennepin Avenue. Here he began holding evening classes taught by himself and his student, Stephen Gjertson. On June twenty-fifth, 1975, fire destroyed the building that housed the school. Lack then rented a large empty space on the second floor of a building across the street. He was able to remodel and reopen the school in the fall. It remained in that location for twenty years.

== Curriculum ==
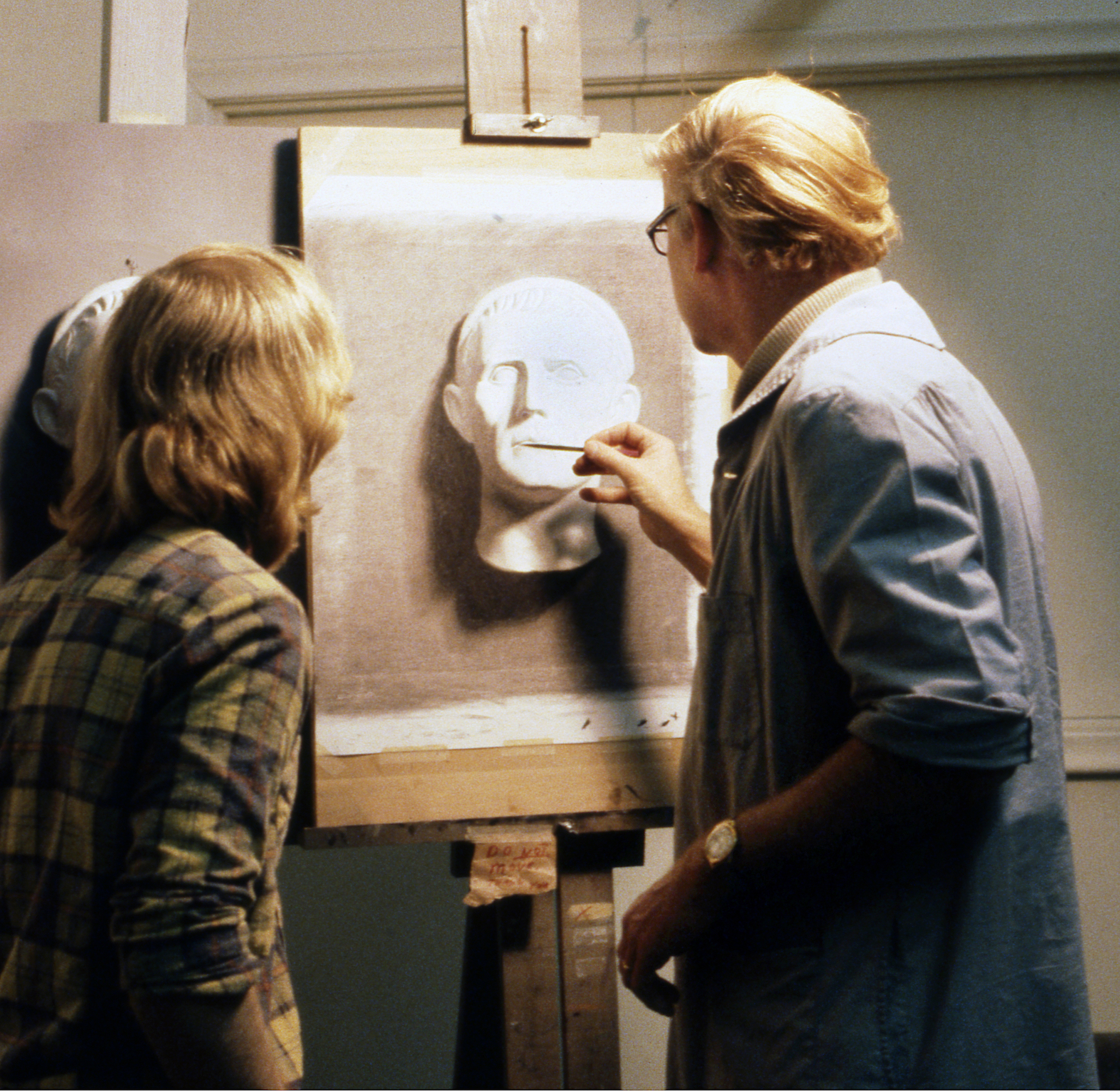
Richard Lack critiquing a student cast drawing.

Lack based his teaching methods on the principles that he had learned from R. H. Ives Gammell. The curriculum was based on nineteenth century French ateliers and the teaching of the Boston impressionists. The primary goal was to train the students to accurately see and render shapes, values, and color. Study began with drawings and paintings of plaster casts and progressed to still-life and portrait paintings. Students had their own cubicles, where they spent the morning working individually on casts, still lives, and head studies. They did cast drawings and paintings under artificial light. Advanced students progressed to studios with natural light, where they executed most of their studies in color. In the afternoons they collectively drew or painted the nude figure. Lack visited the studio two days a week to critique the students’ work, gauge their progress, and demonstrate working methods. He regularly painted finished head studies as demonstrations for the students. He also encouraged them to study anatomy by doing skeletal and muscular overlays on their figure drawings. After they completed each life drawing, Lack advised the students to do them from memory.

Interested students also learned how to grind their own pigment and make, decorate, and gild picture frames. Like painters of the past, Lack frequently employed advanced students to help him on his own work. They gained valuable experience by transferring drawings and underpainting some portraits and figure paintings. Lack also offered evening classes taught by himself and former or advanced students. In 1978, evening instructor Stephen Gjertson began assisting Lack teaching the full-time students. Gjertson also taught a class in composition and design. Former student, Annette LeSueur, later provided lessons in anatomy.

== Atelier east ==
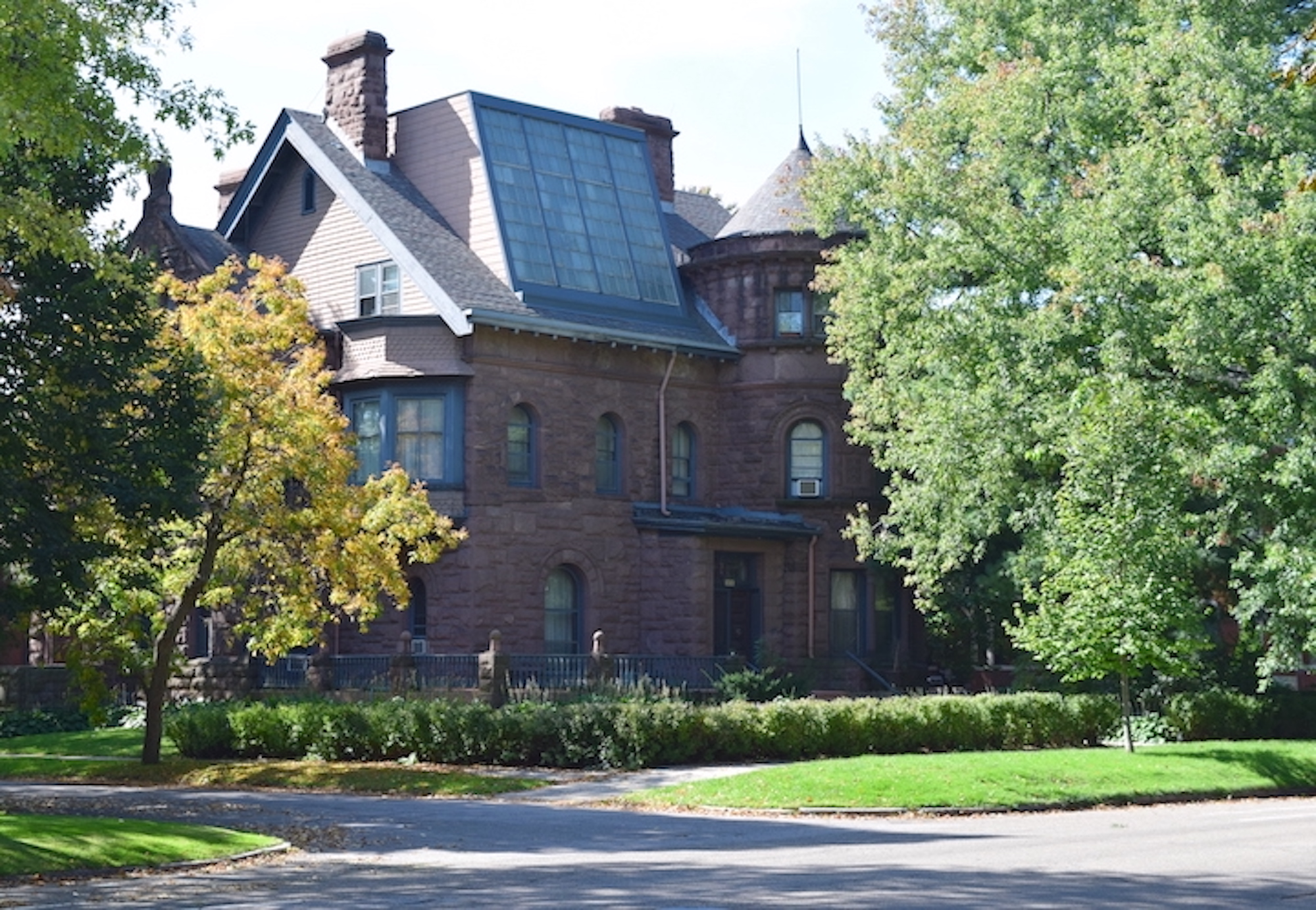
Atelier East.

In 1984 Atelier Lack rented a spacious and well-lit studio on the third floor of the Chauncey and Martha Griggs House, a large Victorian home on Summit Avenue in Saint Paul. "Atelier East" was an offshoot of Atelier Lack. It operated in that location until the school year ended in 1987.

== Advanced atelier ==
Lack encouraged advanced students who were interested in imaginative painting to extend their stay at the school and paint compositions in the bistre and Venetian methods. In 1988 Lack began teaching a group of three advanced students imaginative painting procedures and methods at Atelier LeSueur in Excelsior. The studio was large, and he utilized the space to work on his "Day of Wrath" triptych. Lack operated the advanced atelier for two years, until his health began to fail.

== Student exhibitions ==
At the end of May Atelier Lack held a yearly exhibition of student work. The main drawing room was large and well lit, providing a fine venue for exhibitions. The annual student show taught the students to prepare, organize, advertise, design, and hang a successful exhibition.

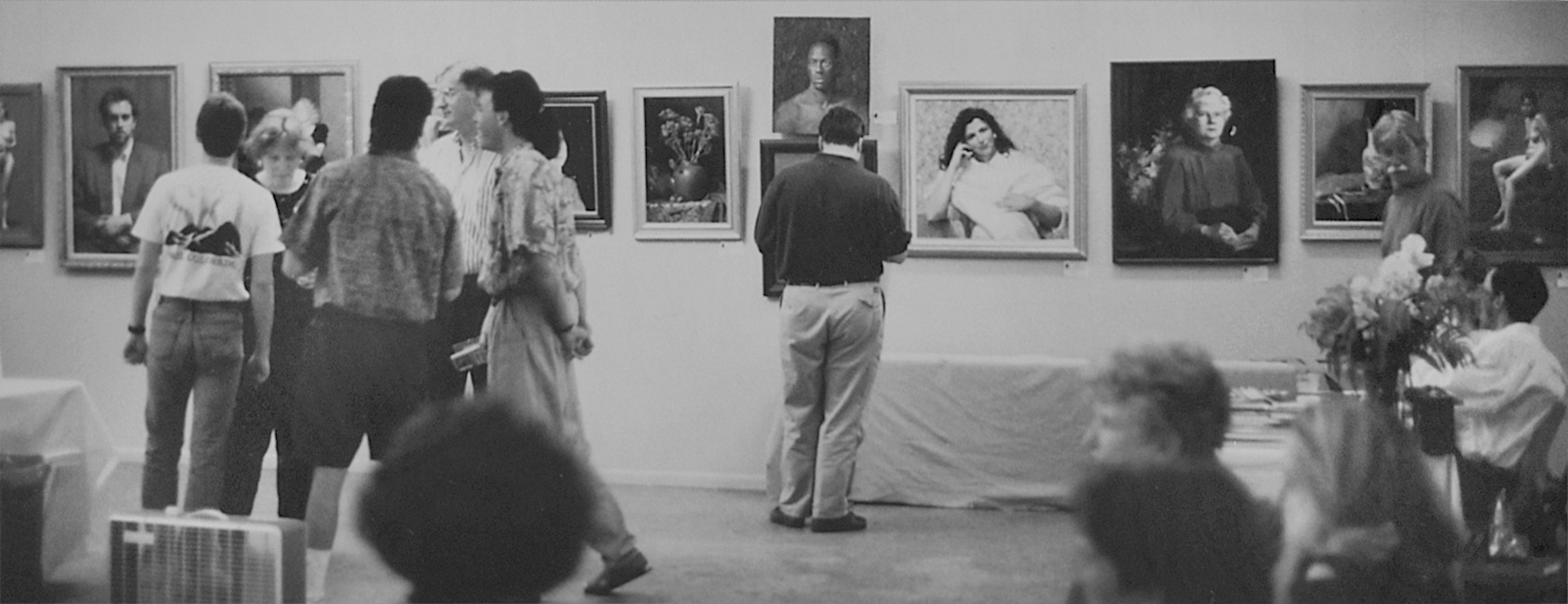
Atelier Lack student exhibition.

== Retirement ==
In 1992 Lack retired from teaching. Former students, Cyd Wicker and Dale Redpath, assumed teaching responsibilities at the school for two more years. In 1994 they relocated to a larger third floor space in northeast Minneapolis and changed the school’s name to The Atelier Studio Program of Fine Arts. The school is still operating. In 2017 Dale Redpath retired as a director and it is now directed by Cyd Wicker and co-directed by Laura Tundel.
