= Richard F. Lack =

American artist, educator, and writer (1928–2009)

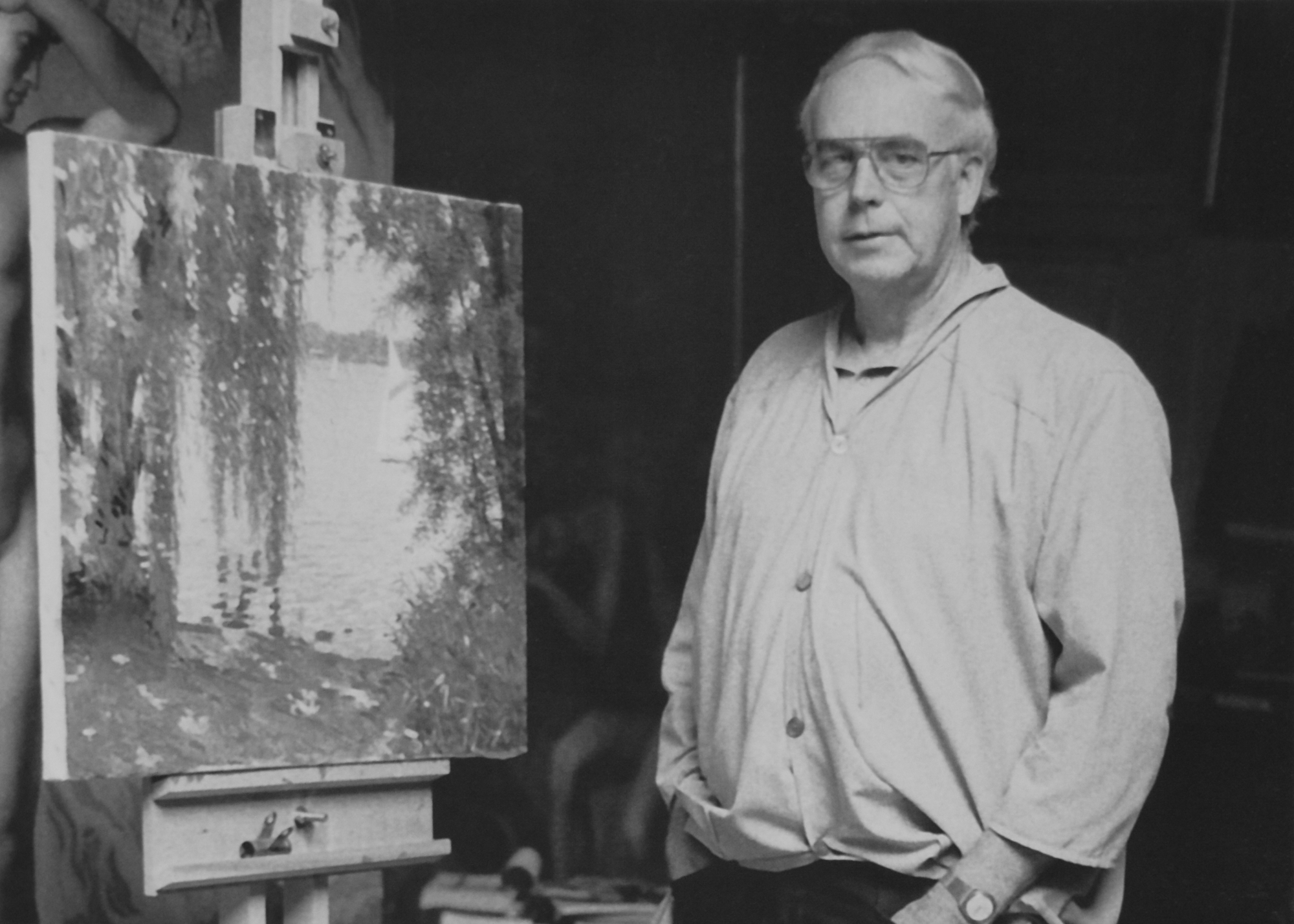
Richard F. Lack

Richard Frederick Lack (March 26, 1928 – September 22, 2009) was an American artist, educator, and writer. He is known for his work in all major genres of traditional art and is considered the "father of the atelier movement in America". He founded Atelier Lack in 1969 to train students interested in learning the skills necessary to create fine representational art, and he initiated the use of the term "Classical Realism" as an artistic designation. He trained over 90 artists who taught or opened ateliers.

== Background and education ==
Richard Frederick Lack was born in Minneapolis, Minnesota, on March 26, 1928, the only child of Frederick and Mildred Lack. He grew up among primarily Scandinavian immigrant families living near Lake Nokomis in the southern part of the city, an area made famous by Longfellow's poem The Song of Hiawatha. Lack was interested in art from an early age through the illustrations of N. C. Wyeth and Donn P. Crane. He began drawing from life in classes at the Walker Art Center when he was 15 years old. After two years at the Minneapolis Institute of Art, he became frustrated with the school's inability to teach him anything of practical value. Lack traveled to New York in 1949 and then went to Boston where he studied in the atelier of R. H. Ives Gammell.

Richard Lack studied with R. H. Ives Gammell from 1950 to 1956. In 1951 his training was interrupted by two years of service in the U. S. Army, where he worked as an intelligence specialist during the Korean War. He returned to Boston in 1953. In 1957 he returned to Minneapolis with his wife, Katherine. They purchased a home in Glen Lake and Lack built a studio designed to simulate the lighting conditions recommended in the notebooks of Leonardo da Vinci. In 1958 he received a grant from the John F. and Anna Lee Stacy Scholarship Fund.

== Career ==
During his career Lack created work in most of the major genres of Western art: portrait, genre, still-life, landscape, printmaking, and works based on myth, history, and the psychology of C. G. Jung.

Lack was a highly sought after portrait artist and he painted many notable figures, among them six portraits for the Kennedy family in Hyannis Port, Massachusetts, a portrait for England's sixth Eardley-Wilmot Baronet, and Minnesota Governors Wendell Anderson and Albert Quie.

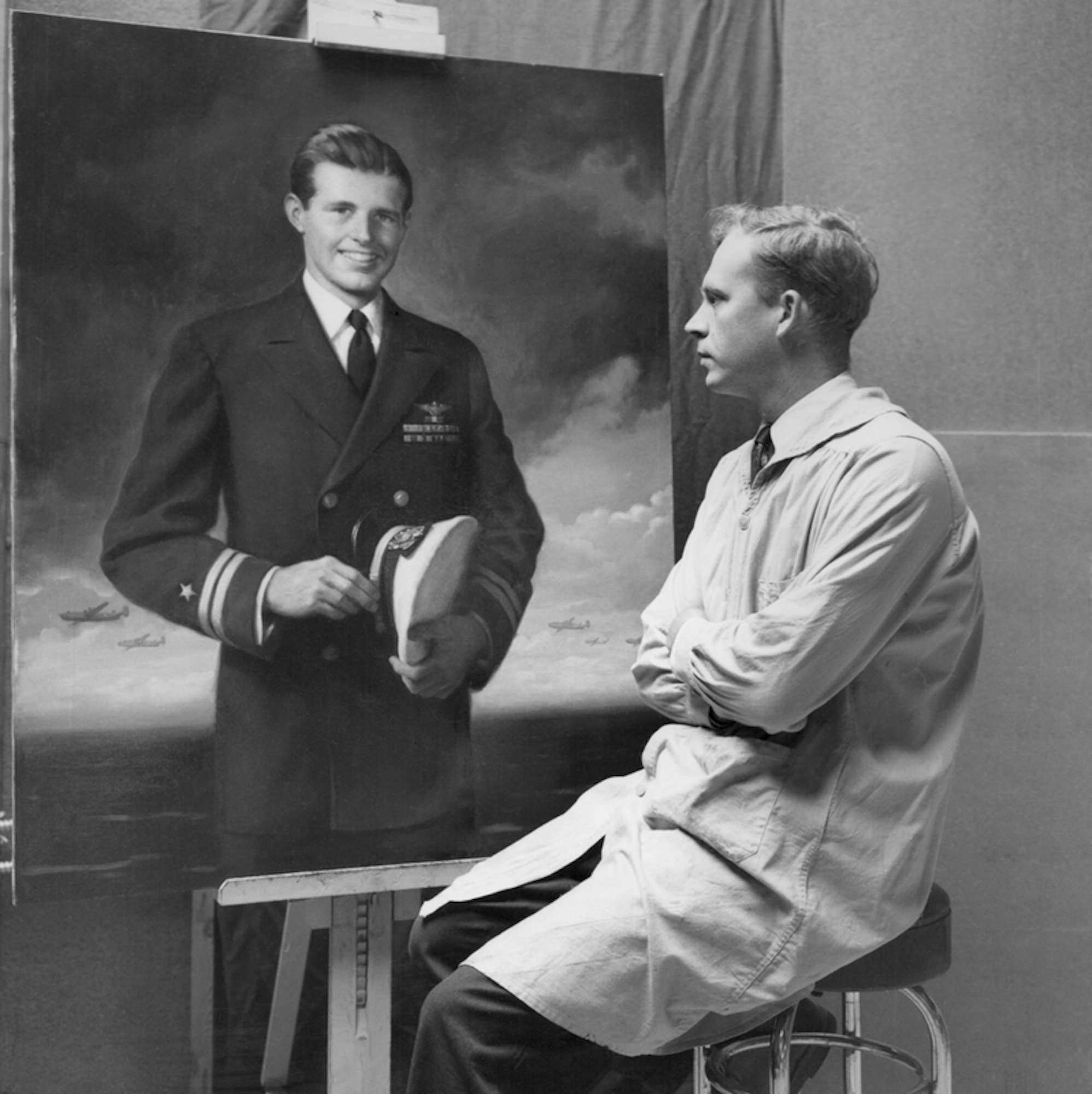
Lack with his portrait of Joseph P. Kennedy Jr.

== Teaching ==
In 1969 Richard Lack founded Atelier Lack, Inc., a small, non-profit studio school of drawing and painting. The school offered a four-to-five-year program based on the teaching methods of the nineteenth century French ateliers and Boston impressionism. Throughout his teaching career he taught ninety-eight full-time students. He retired from teaching in 1992 due to ill health. After his retirement two of his pupils, Cyd Wicker and Dale Redpath, renamed the school The Atelier Studio Program of Fine Arts and moved it to a location in northeast Minneapolis.

== Classical Realism ==
In 1981 Vern G. Swanson, director of the Springville Museum of Art in Springville, Utah, invited Lack and his colleagues to organize an exhibition of their work that would originate at his museum and bear the title "The Other Twentieth Century." Vern Swanson asked Lack to come up with a term that would differentiate the realism of the heirs of the Boston tradition from that of other representational artists. For a solo exhibition in 1974 Lack had used the term "classical realism" to describe his work. It was difficult, however, to find a term that would characterize the work of a diverse group of painters, even within a specific tradition. Although he was reluctant to use it, he settled on "classical realism" to describe the work of the artists represented in the exhibition. The title of the show became "Classical Realism: The Other Twentieth Century". The exhibition opened at the Springville Museum of Art, then travelled to the Amarillo Museum of Art and closed at the Maryhill Museum of Art in Goldendale, Washington.

During his later years Lack devoted most of his time and energy to painting a series of large works based on Jungian psychology, which depict man's inner journey toward individuation and psychological wholeness.

== Author and articles ==
Lack was the author of many articles on art including the influential booklet On the Training of Painters With Notes on the Atelier Program. He and his wife edited the book Realism in Revolution: The Art of the Boston School. Richard was the co-founder of the Classical Realism Quarterly, the forerunner to the Classical Realism Journal. He was also the co-founder of The American Society of Classical Realism and, along with Stephen Gjertson and Don Koestner, a founding member of its Guild of Artists. More than one hundred fifty articles were written about him and his work including "Richard Lack's System of Training Painters", American Artist, Summer 1971 and "Is it Radical to Paint like Rembrandt?", Twin Cities, July 1983. Richard was listed in Who's Who in American Art, Who's Who in International Art and Antiques, Who's Who in the Midwest, Who's Who in American Education, and International Biographies.

== Exhibitions and awards ==
Richard Lack exhibited in eighty-seven solo and group exhibitions throughout the United States. He and his work won twenty-nine medals and awards. The last exhibition of Lack's work during his lifetime was "Distinguished Company: A Retrospective Exhibition of Works by Richard Lack, Don Koestner, and Stephen Gjertson". It opened in January 2009. He died late in the evening on September 22, 2009, at the age of eighty-one. He was interred in a private ceremony at Fort Snelling National Cemetery. On November first the Lack family held a well-attended public tribute, memorial service, and exhibition at the University of Minnesota Landscape Arboretum in Chaska, Minnesota.
