= Comparative measurement =

Candy Tilton Ulrich painting at Sarasota Jungle Gardens (United States, 1948)

Proportions of the human body

Comparative measurement is an artistic technique used to draw proportions from life. It involves using the eye and sometimes a straight-edged tool like a ruler, knitting needle, pencil, or finger. It's usually used for still life or figure drawing, and taught in formal art classes. It's useful because it can be done quickly, even in the absence of tools, and without grids or projections.

Comparative measurement is done through first choosing a common measurement. This means viewing the subject, for example, a person, and choosing the length of their shoulders as your common measurement. The next step is to draw the shoulders on your artwork. Now when you want to know how the hips compare proportionally to the shoulders, you can measure the hips in terms of how many "shoulders" wide they are. One issue with comparative measurement, rectified slightly by sight-size measurement, is the growth of small errors into larger ones, given the dependency of each proportion based on the last one being correct.

The reference measurement can also be the length of a pencil. It is important to maintain a straight arm while measuring, for the sake of a constant distance from the subject.

== Sight-size ==
The sight-size method, also called direct measurement, is a similar measurement technique for objective life drawing. It has key differences from comparative measurement, and is sometimes considered a separate school of thought, although it's also a measurement technique using the naked eye. In the sight-size method, the subject is visually lined up, but physically at a distance, beside the drawing, so the artist can look rapidly back-and-forth between the two. One drawback of the sight-size method is its requirement for the set-up of easel and model in precisely the same place every session.

This method can be traced back to at least the 17th century. Modern sight-size methods were first recorded by French artist de Piles in his 1708 book, when he recommended putting the drawing beside the model so the artist could compare the two and see what changes need to be made. However, even in records from the 1400s, Italian painters like da Vinci and Alberti were concerned with perspective and optimal positions for viewing a subject.
