= Ray Gammell =

Ray Gammell is an Irish businessman and the interim Group CEO of the Etihad Aviation Group since May 2017.

== Early life ==
Gammell was born in Greystones, Ireland.

== Career ==
Gammell graduated from the University College Dublin with a master's degree and is a chartered officer at the Chartered Institute of Personnel Development.

He has held executive positions for Intel in the US and Ireland, the Royal Bank of Scotland, and was an officer in the Irish Armed Forces.

Gammell joined Etihad in 2009 as the Chief People and Performance Officer, where he was responsible for developing the airline's people strategy and performance driven culture.

In May 2017, he was named as the Interim Group CEO of the Etihad Aviation Group, replacing the outgoing chief executive, James Hogan.
