= R. H. Ives Gammell =

American painter (1893–1981)

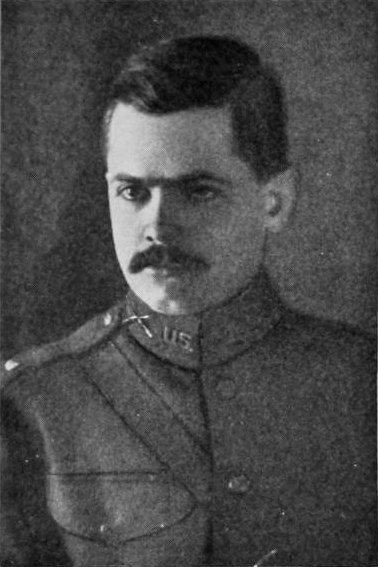
- Gammell during his military service
- Born: Robert Hale Ives Gammell; 1883; Providence, Rhode Island
- Died: 1981 (aged 97–98); Boston, Massachusetts
- Education: School of the Museum of Fine Arts, Académie Julian, William McGregor Paxton
- Known for: Painting
- Notable work: The Hound of Heaven (1956)
- Movement: Classical Realism

Robert Hale Ives Gammell (1893–1981) was an American artist best known for his sequence of paintings based on Francis Thompson's poem "The Hound of Heaven". Gammell painted symbolic images that reflected his study of literature, mythology, psychology, and religion.

== Early life and education ==
Gammell was born into a wealthy family in Providence, Rhode Island and attended Groton School. He spent much time alone drawing, and by his teens expressed his desire to pursue art. He went to the School of the Museum of Fine Arts in Boston, where his teachers included Edmund C. Tarbell, Joseph DeCamp, and Philip Leslie Hale, all members of the Boston School of painters. He went to the Académie Baschet where he studied with Henri Royer and William Laparra in Paris, but his studies were interrupted by World War I, during which he served with the U.S. military.

Returning to Boston, Gammell painted murals, portraits, and landscapes. He aspired to more imaginative subjects, but he felt restricted by what he considered his inferior drawing and compositional skills. He apprenticed to painter and teacher William McGregor Paxton, also of the Boston School, who was considered an expert in these skills. Paxton had been a student of the French academic painter Jean-Léon Gérôme, who was himself a student of Paul Delaroche.

== The Hound of Heaven ==
In the 1930s Gammell's skill caught up with his ambition. Unlike many of his Boston School peers, he was less interested in portraits and landscapes than in symbolic and mythological images. Although the decade of the 1930s had been his most productive, it ended in a mental breakdown.

While recovering, he discovered in Psychology of the Unconscious by Carl Jung a way to approach what he considered his greatest artistic achievement: a sequence of paintings depicting "The Hound of Heaven", a religious poem by Francis Thompson (1859–1907). The poem had captured Gammell's imagination when he was a boy, and for years he had made notes and sketches about it. In Thompson's poem a man is pursued by God. According to Gammell, in the catalog he wrote to accompany the sequence's first exhibit in 1956, he interpreted the poem not so much as a religious conversion as "a history of the experience known as an emotional breakdown". He wrote that Jung's work had provided the link between "myths, symbols, and poetic imagery, and the perpetually recurring emotional patterns of human life from which they evolved." The series of 23 paintings was titled A Pictorial Sequence Painted by R. H. Ives Gammell Based on The Hound of Heaven.

The paintings are part of the collection of the Maryhill Museum of Art near Maryhill, Washington.

== Writing and teaching ==
In 1946 Gammell published a book of art criticism, Twilight of Painting, in which he argued that modern art, with its emphasis on abstraction, undermined the tradition of European craftsmanship. He tried to explain how this problem had occurred and how it might be solved. In Gammell's lament he revealed the aspects of painting he admired: classical, realistic, representational, and academic. He wrote a book of essays published posthumously, The Boston Painters, 1900-1930; edited Shop Talk of Edgar Degas; and wrote a monograph about the Boston painter Dennis Miller Bunker.

Starting in the 1940s, Gammell taught at Fenway Studios in Boston in a room down the hall from where he painted. His student, the painter Robert Cormier, said Gammell's classes included the study of anatomy, memory drawing, and the sight-size method. Another student was Richard F. Lack, the founder of Classical Realism. Lack recalled that Gammell wanted his students to be immersed in culture. He was a member of the Boston Athenæum and encouraged them to borrow books, attend museums, the symphony, and the opera.
