= National Register of Historic Places listings in Klickitat County, Washington =

Location of Klickitat County in Washington

This list presents the full set of buildings, structures, objects, sites, or districts designated on the National Register of Historic Places in Klickitat County, Washington, and offers brief descriptive information about each of them. The National Register recognizes places of national, state, or local historic significance across the United States. Out of over 90,000 National Register sites nationwide, Washington is home to approximately 1,500, and 12 of those are found in Klickitat County.

This National Park Service list is complete through NPS recent listings posted March 21, 2025.

== Current listings ==
	Name on the Register	Image	Date listed	Location	City or town	Description
1	Appleton Log Hall	Appleton Log Hall	October 2, 1992 (#92001294)	835 Appleton Rd. 45°48′36″N 121°16′30″W	Appleton	
2	First Day Advent Christian Church	First Day Advent Christian Church	September 26, 1991 (#91001439)	Jct. of Maryhill Hwy. and Stonehenge Ave. 45°41′14″N 120°48′47″W	Maryhill	
3	Goldendale Free Public Library	Goldendale Free Public Library	August 3, 1982 (#82004259)	131 W. Burgen; 45°49′15″N 120°49′22″W	Goldendale	Carnegie Libraries of Washington TR
4	Klickitat County Courthouse	Klickitat County Courthouse	September 10, 2014 (#14000613)	205 S. Columbus Ave. 45°49′17″N 120°49′22″W	Goldendale	
5	Maryhill	Maryhill	December 31, 1974 (#74001966)	SW of Goldendale on U.S. 197; 45°40′40″N 120°51′48″W	Goldendale	
6	Charles Newell House	Charles Newell House	August 18, 1977 (#77001344)	114 Sentinel St. 45°49′02″N 120°49′22″W	Goldendale	
7	Rattlesnake Creek Site	Rattlesnake Creek Site	May 22, 1978 (#78002762)	Address restricted	Husum	
8	Rowland Basin Site	Rowland Basin Site	July 11, 1996 (#96000724)	Address restricted	Lyle	Photo shows a general view of the area
9	Stonehenge Memorial	Stonehenge Memorial	June 28, 2021 (#100006703)	Stonehenge Dr. 45°41′39″N 120°48′22″W	Maryhill	
10	Trout Lake Tourist Club	Trout Lake Tourist Club	September 21, 2005 (#05001063)	15 Guler Rd. 46°00′15″N 121°32′22″W	Trout Lake	
11	Whitcomb Cabin	Whitcomb Cabin	June 10, 1975 (#75001860)	100 Wildlife Refuge Rd., 6 mi (9.7 km). W of Glenwood; 45°57′48″N 121°20′34″W	Glenwood	
12	Wishram Indian Village Site	Wishram Indian Village Site	March 16, 1972 (#72001278)	Address restricted	The Dalles, Oregon, vicinity	

== See also ==
- National Register of Historic Places listings in Washington state
- Listings in neighboring counties: Benton, Gilliam, Hood River, Morrow, Sherman, Skamania, Wasco, Yakima
- Historic preservation
- History of Washington (state)
- Index of Washington (state)-related articles
