= Fulda (disambiguation) =

Fulda is a city in Hesse, Germany.

Fulda may also refer to:

== In Germany ==
- Fulda (river), a tributary of the Weser
- Fulda (district), in the state of Hesse
- Fulda (electoral district), constituency represented in the Bundestag
- Fulda Gap, an area in central Germany that assumed strategic importance during the Cold War
- Fulda station
- Fulda Symphonic Orchestra
- Fulda Tires, the German division of Goodyear
- University of Fulda
- Fulda University of Applied Sciences
- Borussia Fulda, a football (soccer) club
- Roman Catholic Diocese of Fulda
- Treaty of Fulda, signed in 1813
- Fulda Cathedral
- Fulda monastery

== Other places ==
- Fulda, Indiana, United States
- Fulda, Minnesota, United States
- Fulda, Ohio, United States
- Fulda, Washington, United States, a former community

== People ==
- Adam of Fulda (1445–1505), German Renaissance composer
- Anne Fulda (born 1963), French journalist
- Elisabeth Fulda (1879–1968), German-American artist
- Ludwig Fulda (1862–1939), German writer
- Wilhelm Fulda (1909–1977), German Luftwaffe officer
- Hans Friedrich Fulda (1930–2023), German philosopher

== Biology ==
- Fulda (skipper), a genus of butterflies

== See also ==
- Fuldamobil, a series of small cars produced by Elektromaschinenbau Fulda GmbH
