= Fuld =

Fuld may refer to the former English name of Fulda, a city in Hesse, Germany.

As a German-Jewish family name it may refer to:

- Bracha Fuld, German-born Jewish resistance fighter
- Dick Fuld, banker and executive; former CEO of Lehman Brothers
- Hillel Fuld, American Israeli blogger, vlogger, business advisor and speaker
- Leo Fuld, Dutch singer
- Sam Fuld, American major league baseball outfielder
- Stanley H. Fuld, American lawyer and politician
- William Fuld, American entrepreneur

== See also ==
- Fould family
- Fulda (people)
