= Heinrich von Bibra =

Painting of Heinrich von Bibra by his court painter, Johann Andreas Herrlein

Detail

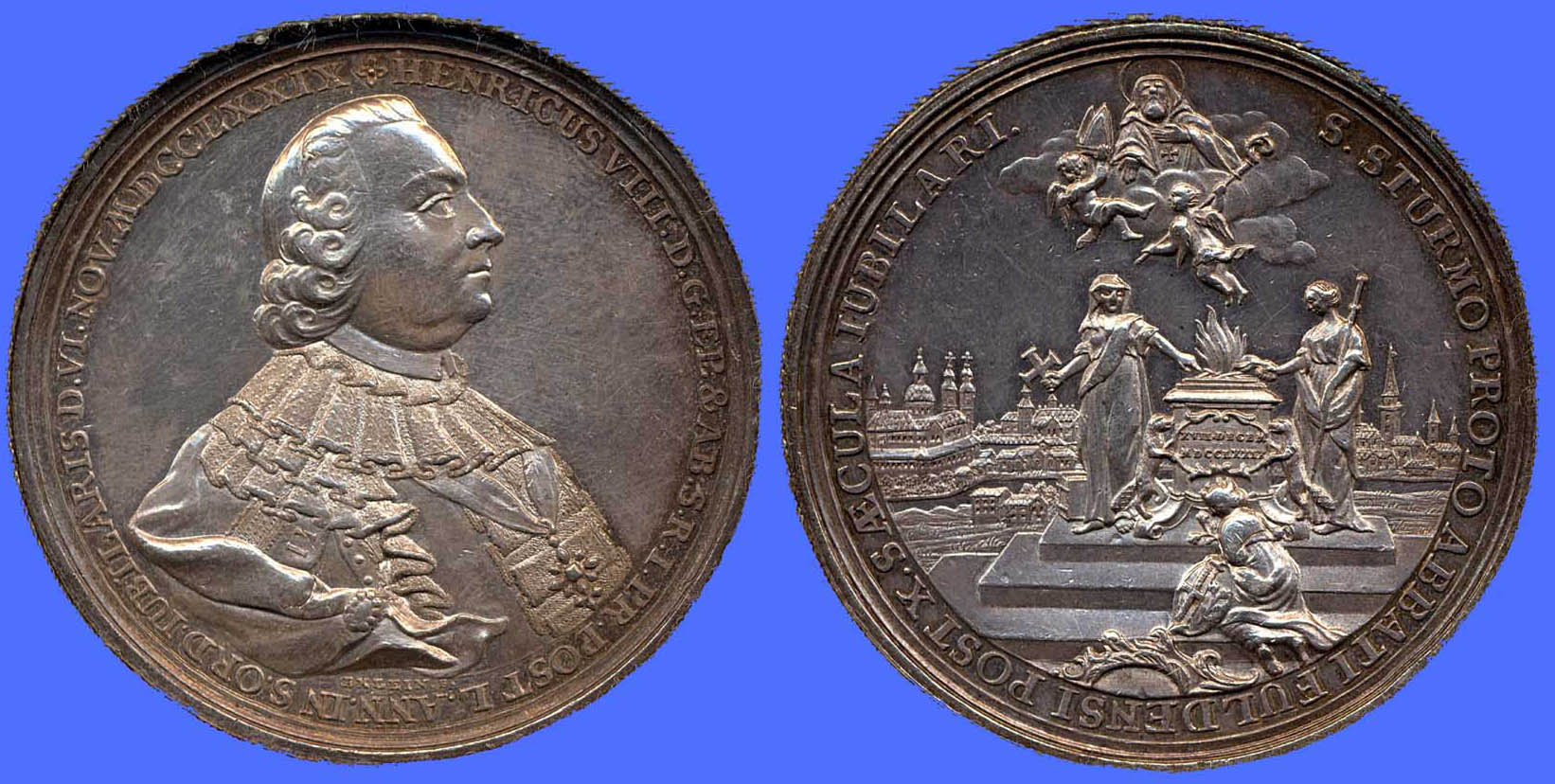
Medallion of Heinrich von Bibra

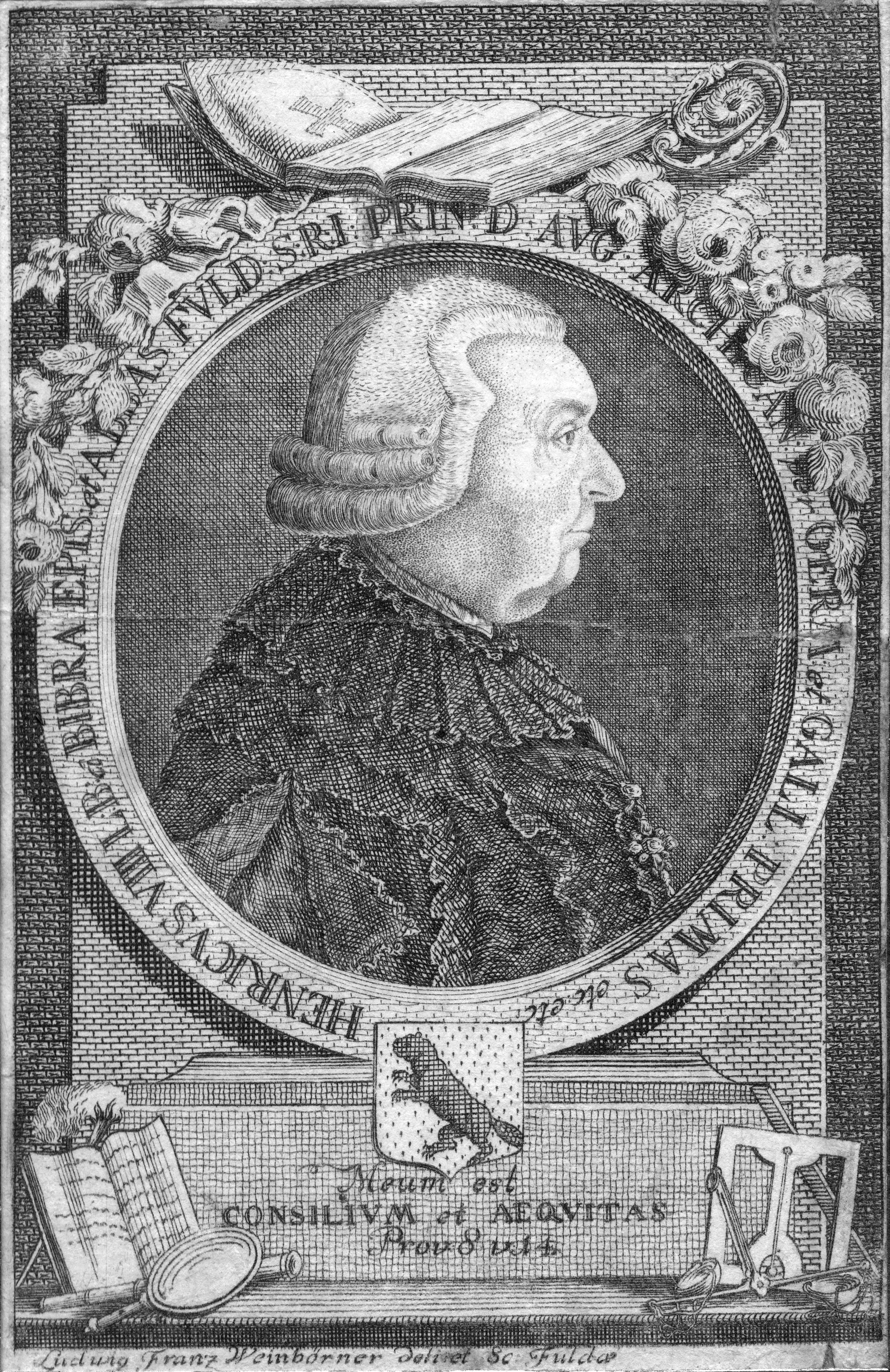

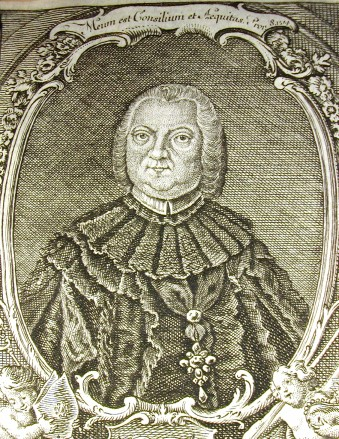
Print from the Calendarium Parum Capituli Fuldensis

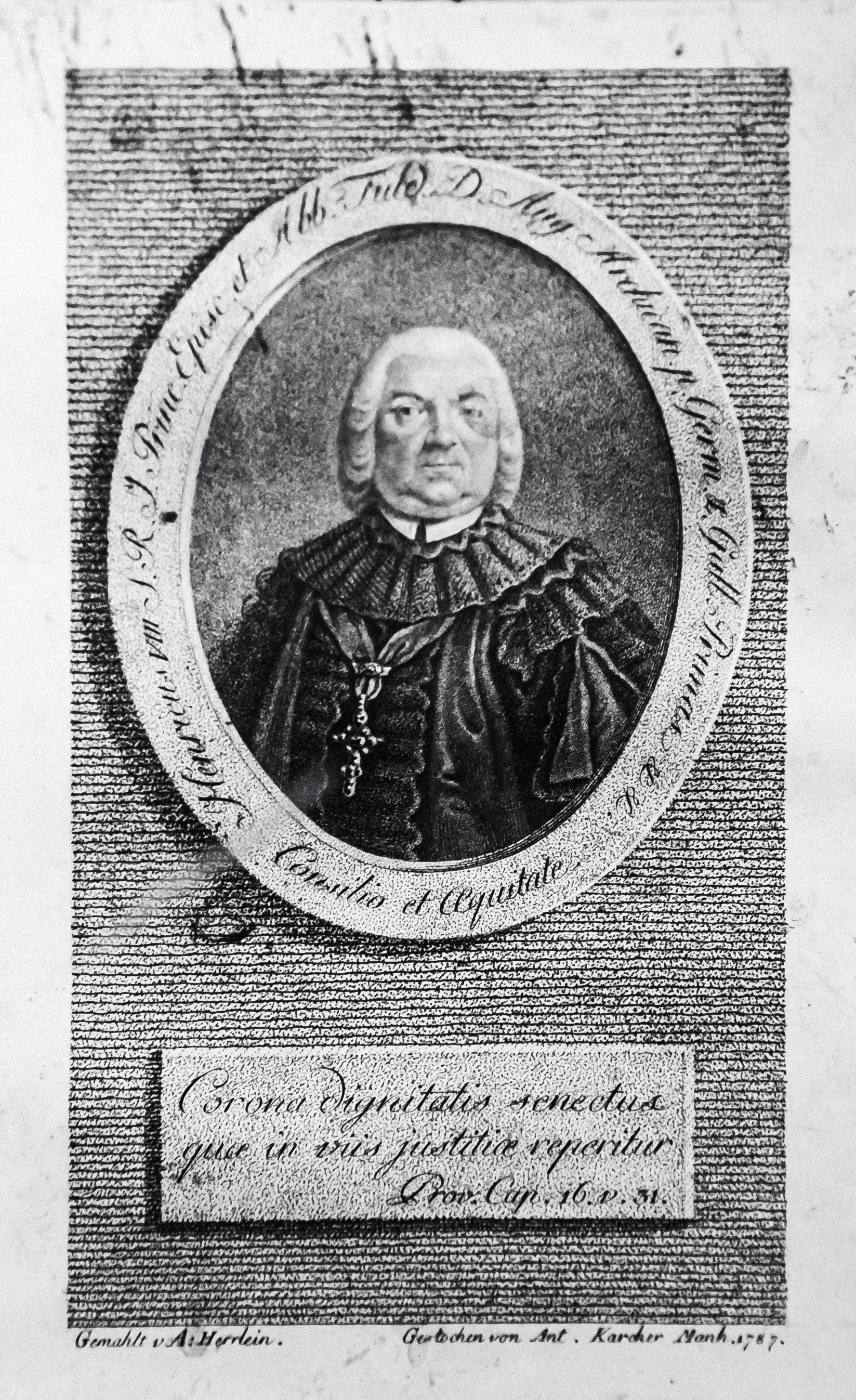
Anton Karcher print

Heinrich von Bibra (Heinrich VIII of Fulda), Prince-Bishop, Prince-Abbot of Fulda (1711–1788) was Prince-Bishop and Prince-Abbot from 1759 to 1788. As part his role as Prince-Abbot of Fulda, he had the additional role as Archchancellor (Erzkanzler) of the Holy Roman Empress. His motto was Consilio et Aequitate (With deliberation and justice).

== Biography ==
Born in 1711 at Schnabelwaid as Karl Sigmund von von Bibra, son of General Heinrich Karl, Baron von Bibra (1666–1734) and his wife Maria Johanna Theresia von Eyb (b. 1685). He was raised in a strict household with ten brothers and sisters. He entered the Benedictine Order in 1730 receiving the name Heinrich. He studied philosophy, theology, and law. Six years later he traveled to Rome.

In 1759 immediately after his selection as Prince Bishop and Abbot of Fulda, he had to flee his realm as it was overrun by both the French and the Hessians in the Seven Years' War. Finally with peace in 1763, he undertook the rebuilding of Fulda and its economy. Rising at 4 am each morning, he was an energetic and enlightened ruler. With currency reform came sound money. He built roads, bridges, housing, churches, and orphanages. He improved the spa at Brückenau, had the land surveyed for minerals, and founded the porcelain works which became famous. The porcelain works was disbanded shortly after his death.

He provided freedom of religion, forbidding mistreatment of Jews and employed Protestants alongside Catholics in his administration. Beginning in 1777 with the exception of the theological faculty every Protestant could acquire academic degrees in all faculties of the University of Fulda. Along with libraries around the land, he introduced a general school system which was one of the best of his time. Heinrich-von-Bibra-Schule a Realschule (type of secondary school) in Fulda is named after him. Contrary to the custom that had been common for centuries, he refrained from erecting his own grave monument during his lifetime, and one was not erected for him after his death either. An engraved floor tile in front of the Adolphus von Dalberg grave by the altar marks the spot today.

== Schloss Johannisberg - riesling - Spätlese - Auslese ==
During Heinrich's reign Fulda owned Schloss Johannisberg (Geisenheim, in the Rheingau region). The origin of the famous late harvest riesling of Johannisberg originated in 1775. The story is that producers at Schloss Johannisberg traditionally awaited the permission of the estate owner before cutting their grapes. In this year, for reasons unknown, Heinrich was otherwise engaged and the cutting was delayed for three weeks, time enough for the Botrytis to take hold and produce the first thoroughly infected Spätlese. An Auslese followed in 1787. See Noble rot and Schloss Johannisberg

== Family ==
Heinrich was a member of the aristocratic Franconian von Bibra family which among its members were Lorenz von Bibra, Prince-Bishop of Würzburg, Duke in Franconia (1459–1519), Lorenz’ half brother, Wilhelm von Bibra Papal emissary, Conrad von Bibra, Prince-Bishop of Würzburg, Duke in Franconia (1490–1544) and Ernst von Bibra (1806–1878), naturalist and author.

== Photo gallery ==
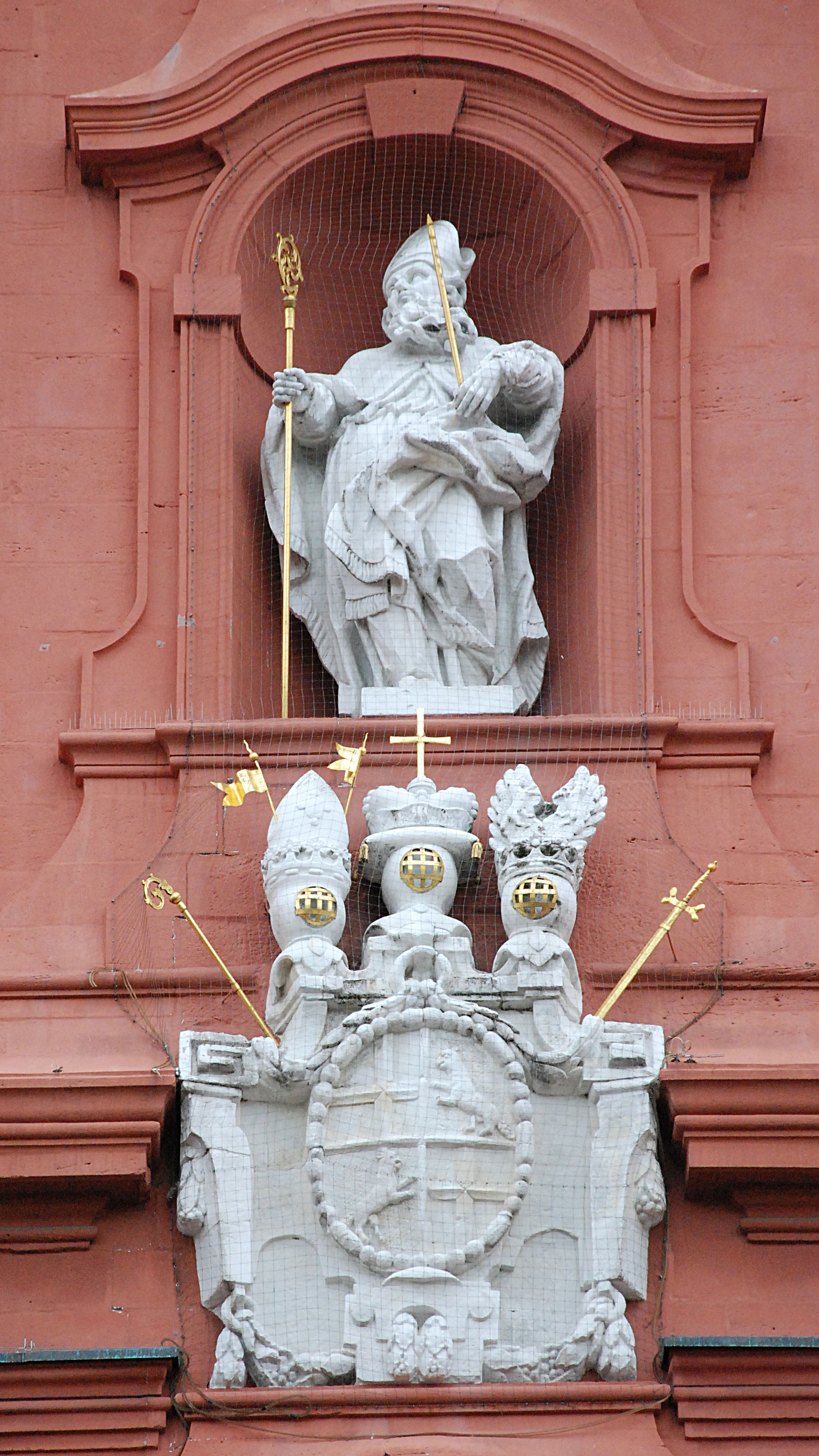
Heinrich von Bibra coat of arms from St. Blasius

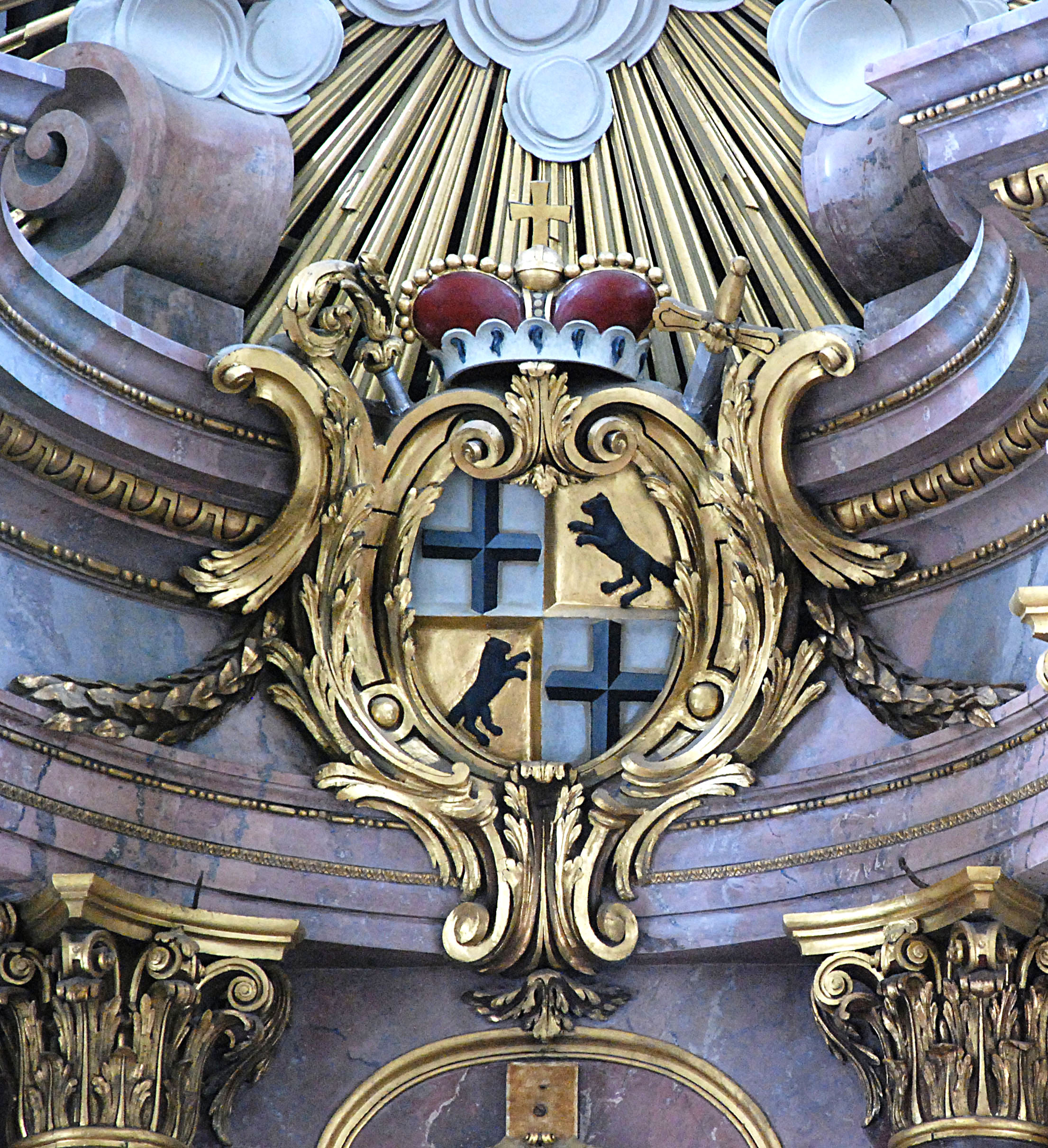
Heinrich von Bibra coat of arms from over altar of St. Blasius

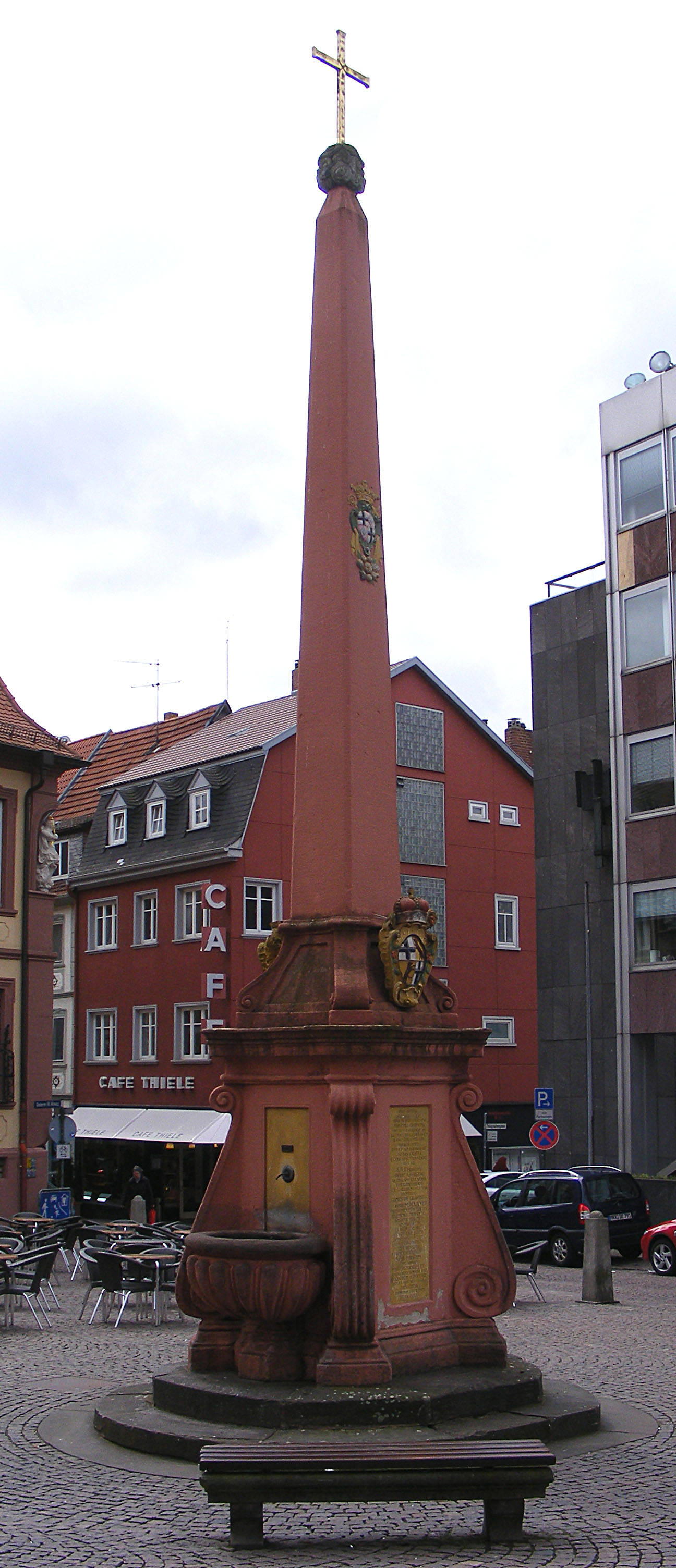
Obelisk in front of St. Blasius

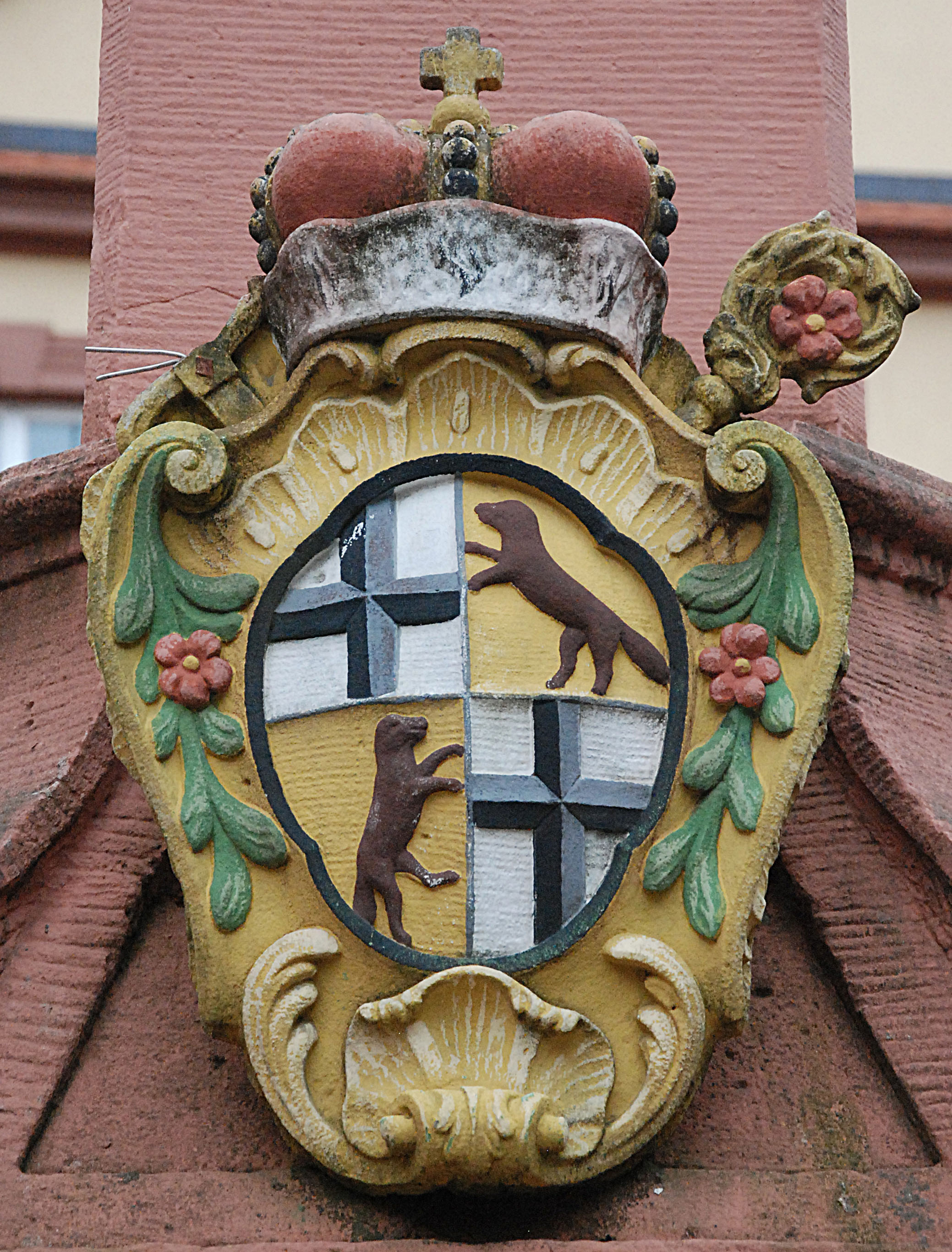
Detail of obelisk in front of St. Blasius

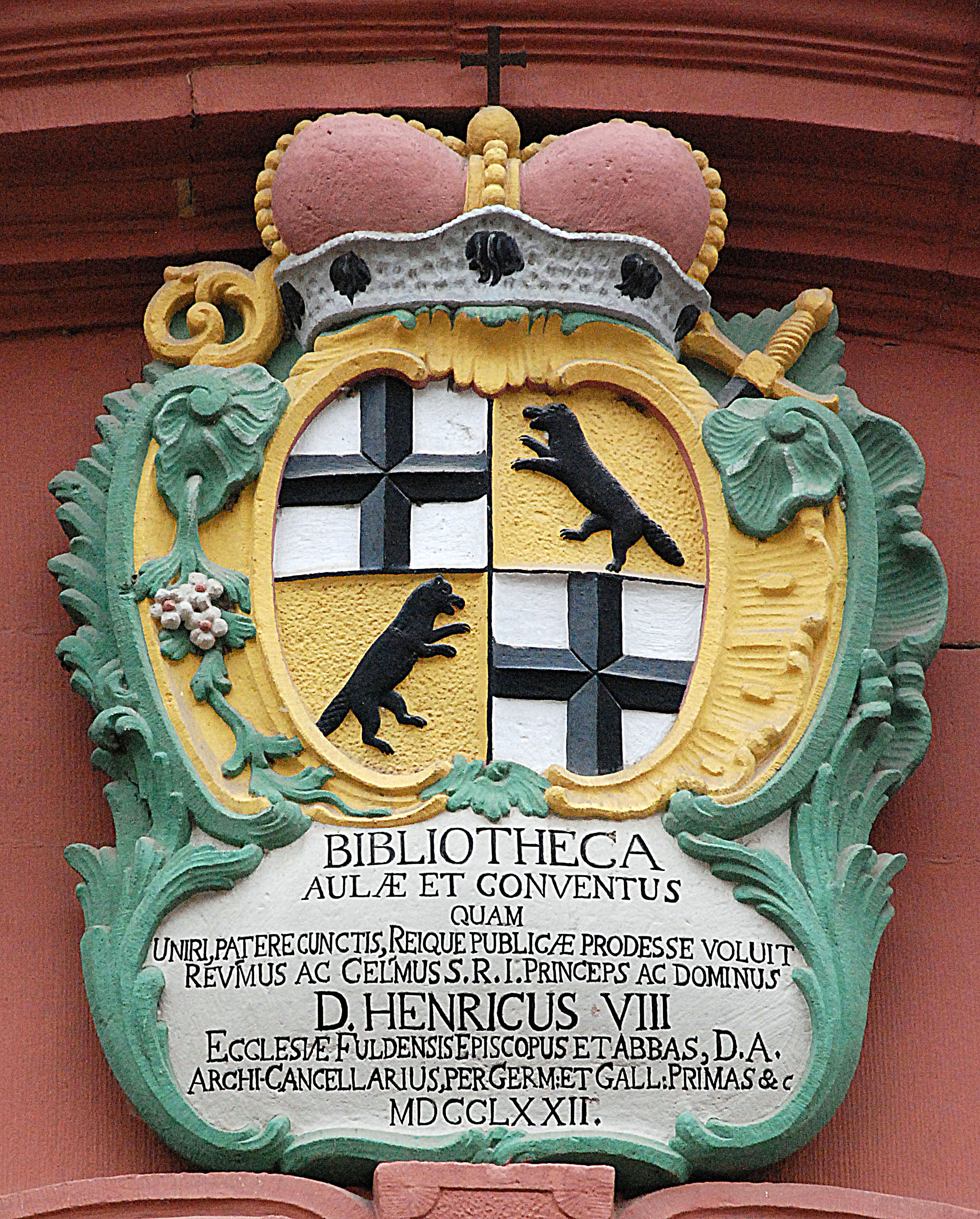
Heinrich VIII coat of arms for the Library (now the Theological Faculty)

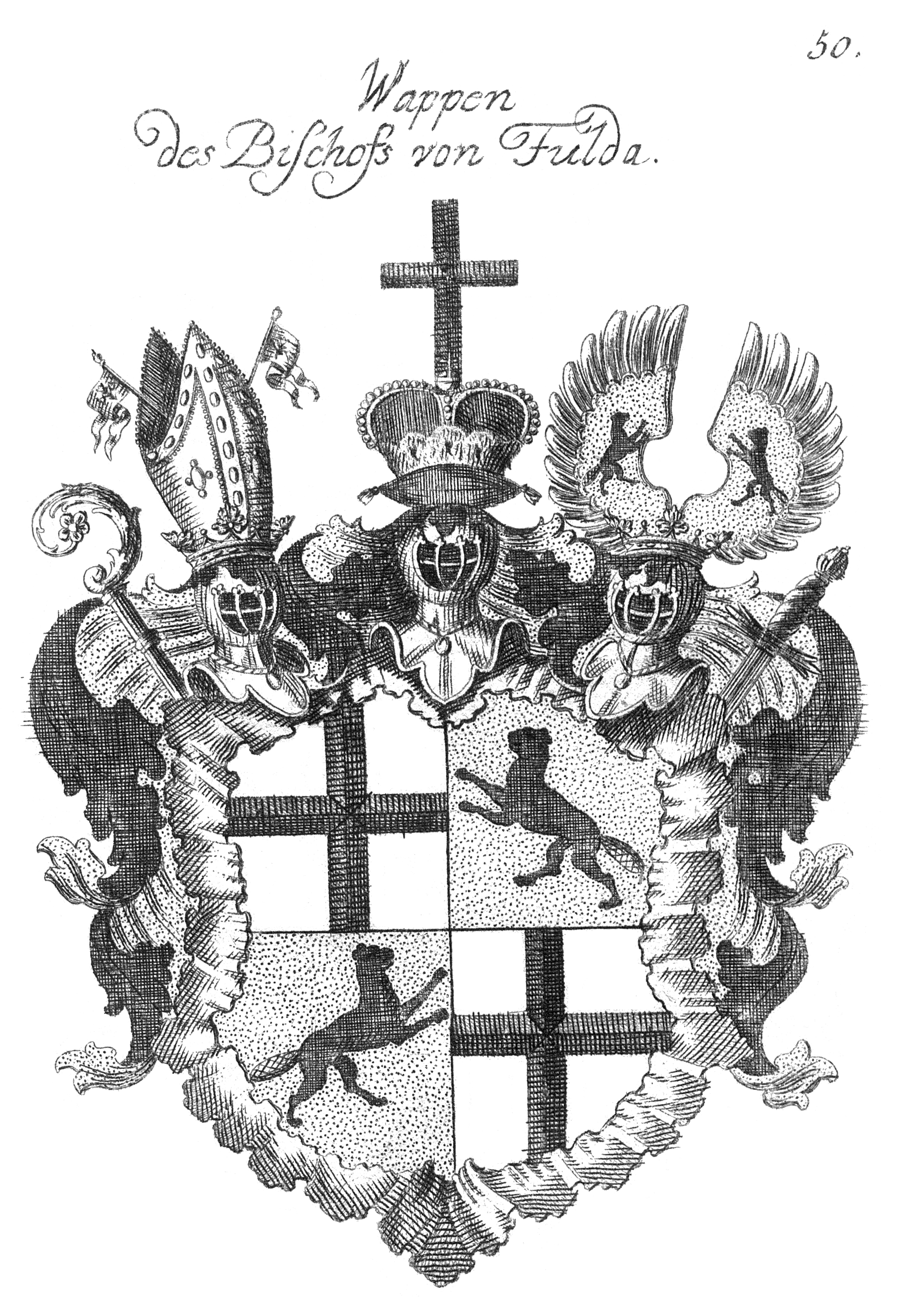
Coat of arms from ""Der durchlauchtigen Welt vollständiges Wappenbuch"

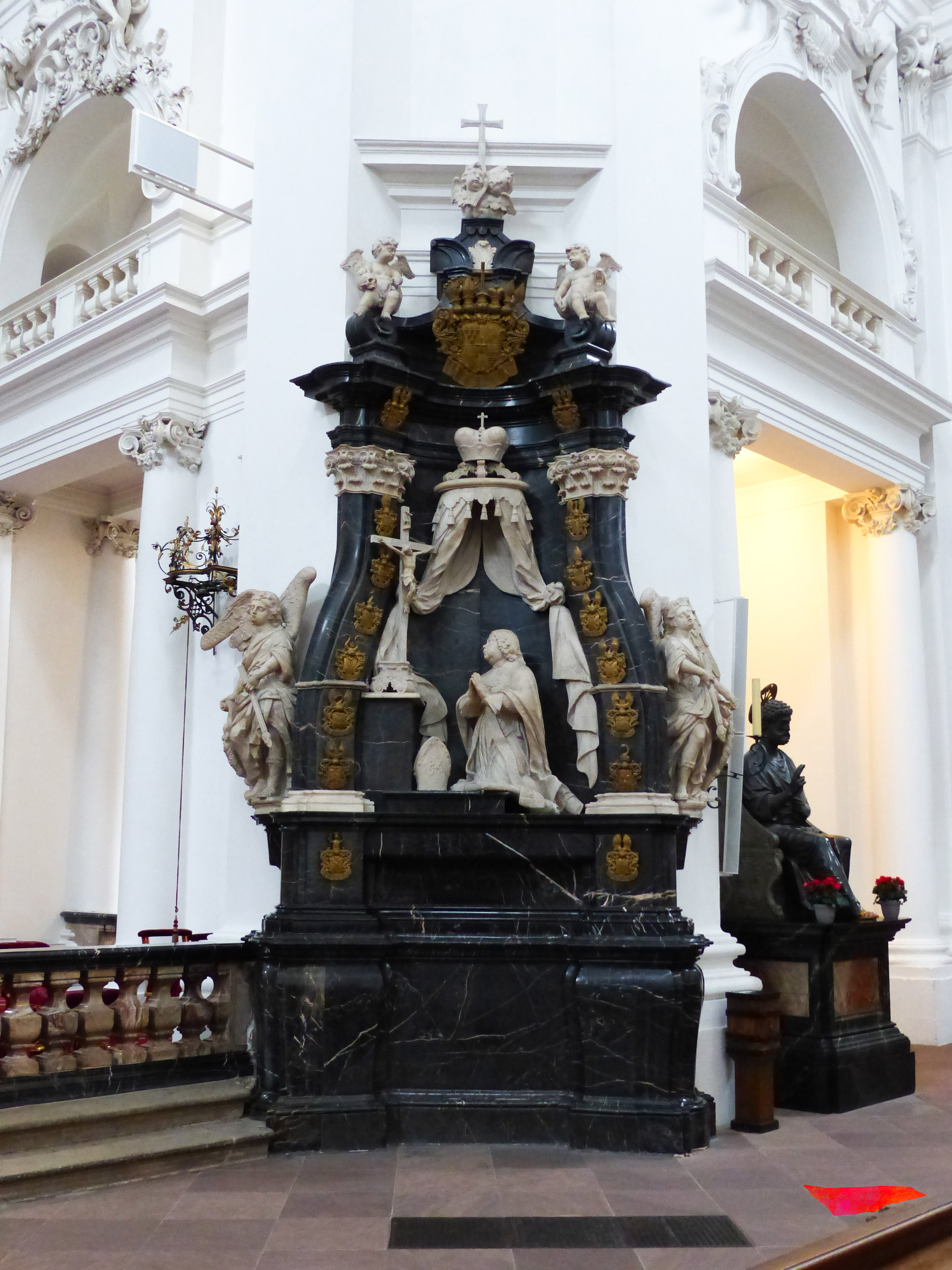
Location of grave in front of Adolf von Dalberg monument Fulda Dom

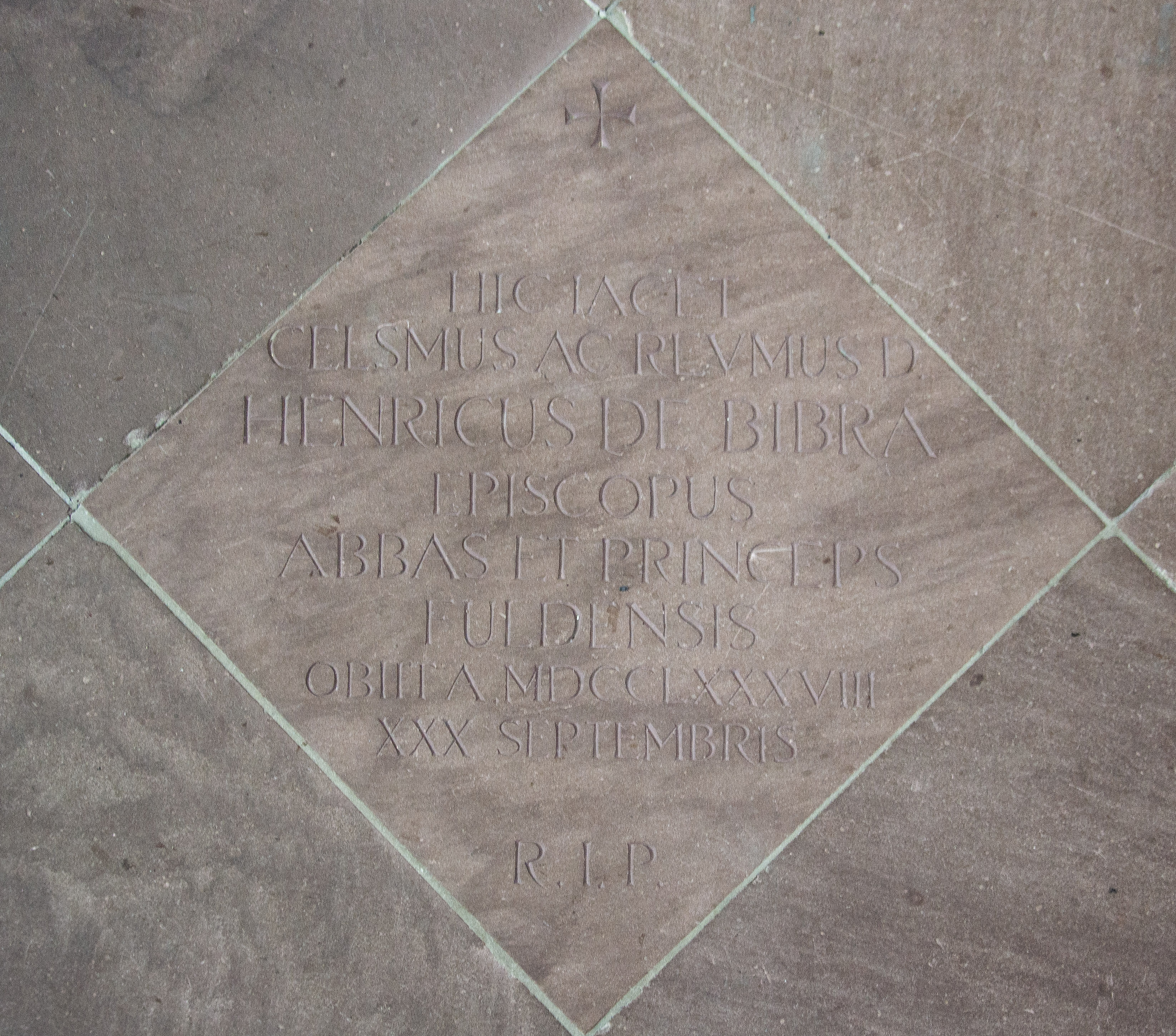
Grave marker on floor of Dom in front of Adolf von Dalberg monument

== Literature ==
- MARINA VON BIBRA, Heinrich VIII. - Fürstbischof von Fulda. In: Gerhard Pfeiffer (Hg.), Fränkische Lebensbilder, Bd. 4, Würzburg 1971, 213–229;
- WILHELM FREIHERR VON BIBRA, Beiträge zur Familien-Geschichte der Reichsfreiherm von Bibra, Bd. 3/I, München 1888, 230–255; Ders., Geschichte der Familie von Bibra. München 1870, 148–150;
- A. GNAU, Das kirchliche Wirken Heinrich VIII. von Bibra, Fürstbischofs von Fulda (1759–1788), in: Mitteilungen des Historischen Vereins der Diözese Fulda 6 (1902) 12–19;
- JOHANN EBERHARD VON KAISER, Regierungsgeschichte des jetztigen Fürsten-Bischofs Heinrich des VIII. zu Fulda im Grundriße, Vornehmlich in Hinsicht der innern Landes-Anstalten und Verbesserungen, in: Patriotisches Archiv für Deutschland 2 (1785) 1–102;
- WERNER KATHREIN, Bibra, Heinrich, in: Erwin Gatz (Hg.), Die Bischöfe des Heiligen Römischen Reiches 1648–1803, Berlin 1990, 29f.;
- JOSEF LEINWEBER, Die Fuldaer Äbte und Bischöfe, Frankfurt a.M. 1989, 159–163;
- MICHAEL MÜLLER, Fürstbischof Heinrich von Bibra und die katholische Aufklärung im Hochstift Fulda (1759–88). Wandel und Kontinuität des kirchlichen Lebens, 451 pp., Fulda 2005.
- PETER ADOLPH WINKOPP, Beiträge zur Lebensgeschichte Heinrich des achten Fürstbischofen zu Fulda, welcher am 25. September 1788 das Zeitliche mit dem Ewigen verwechselte, in: Der neue deutsche Zuschauer 1 (1789) 93–102.134-144;
- KLAUS WITTSTADT, Der Bibliotheksgründer Fürstbischof Heinrich VIII. von Bibra (1759–1788), in: Artur Brall (Hg.), Von der Klosterbibliothek zur Landesbibliothek. Beiträge zum zweihundertjährigen Bestehen der Hessischen Landesbibliothek Fulda (Stuttgart 1978) 269–293;
- F. ZWENGER, Heinrich v. Bibra. Fürstbischof von Fulda, in: BuBl 4 (1923) 139f., 143f., 148 [Weitgehend auf Wilhelm von Bibra beruhend];

Preceded by Adalbert von Walderdorf	Bishop of Fulda; 1759 - 1788	Succeeded by Adalbert Freiherr (Wilhelm Adolph Heinrich) von Harstall
