= Church of the Advent =

Church of the Advent, Advent Church, Cathedral of the Advent, or other variations may refer to:

- Cathedral Church of the Advent (Birmingham, Alabama)
- St. Clement's Chapel or St. Clement's Chapel of the Church of the Advent, Tallahassee, Florida
- Episcopal Church of the Advent (Cynthiana, Kentucky)
- Episcopal Church of the Advent (Louisville, Kentucky)
- Church of the Advent (Limestone, Maine)
- Church of the Advent (Boston)
- Church of the Advent (Farmington, Minnesota)
- Episcopal Church of the Advent / St. John's Chapel, Cape May, New Jersey
- Advent Lutheran Church (New York City)
- Church of the Advent (Southern Pines, North Carolina)
- Episcopal Church of the Advent and Guild Hall, Devil's Lake, North Dakota
- Church of the Advent (Spartanburg, South Carolina)
- Brooksville Advent Church, New Haven, Vermont
- First Day Advent Christian Church, Maryhill, Washington
