= THM =

THM, Thm, thm or ThM may refer to:

- Turbo-Hydramatic, GM vehicle transmission
- Ton of heavy metal in a nuclear power plant
- Ton of hot metal in the steel industry
- Trihalomethanes in chemistry
- Therm, a unit of heat energy
- Technische Hochschule Mittelhessen—University of Applied Sciences
- Master of Theology postnominal, ThM
- "T.H.M.", a song by Deerhunter from the album Monomania (2013)
- THM Files, a file type used to store thumbnails
