= Helmut Heiderich =

German politician (born 1949)

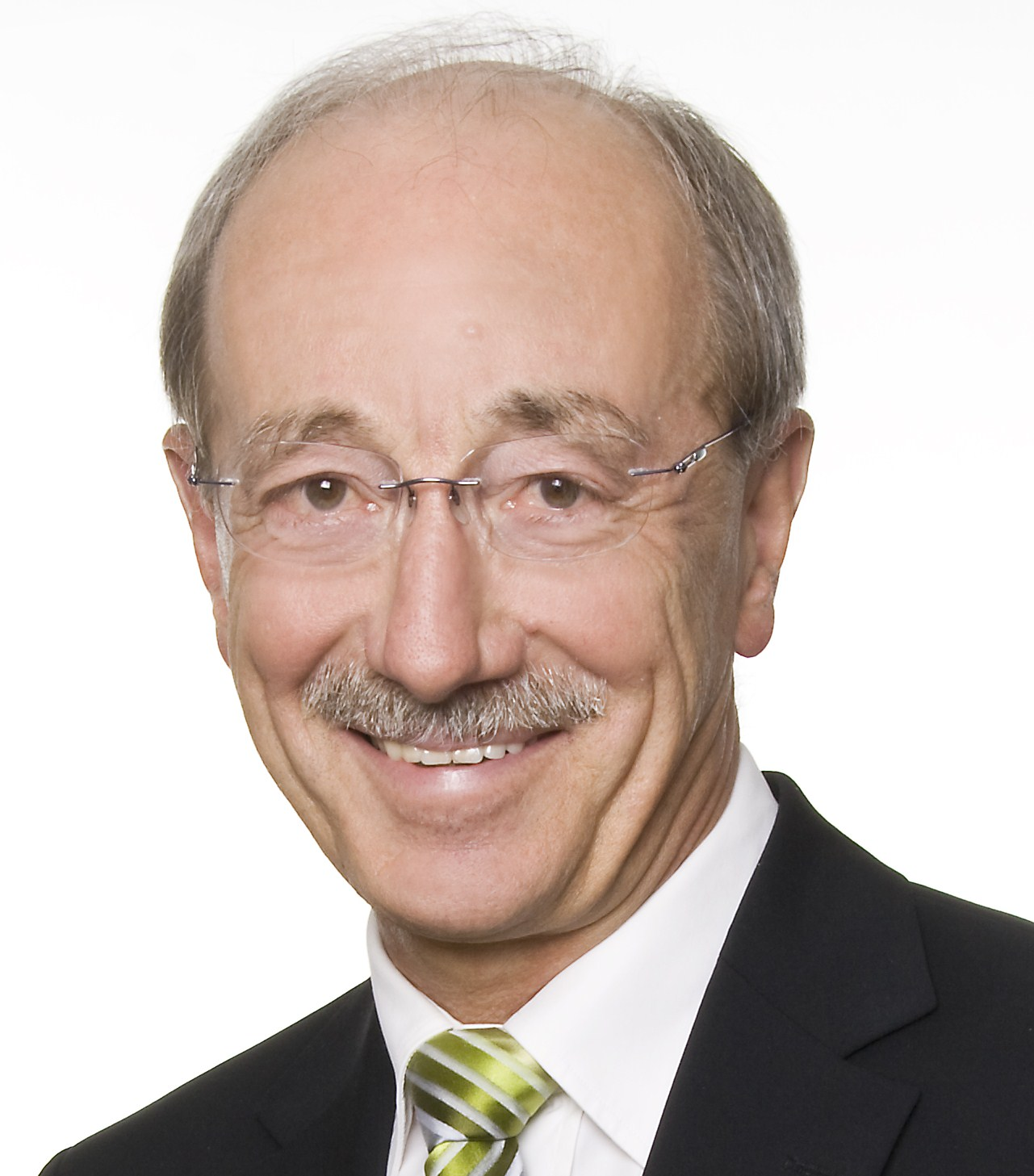
- Heiderich in 2009

Member of the Bundestag; from Hesse
- In office 9 March 2011 – 24 October 2017
- Preceded by: Holger Haibach
- Succeeded by: Multi-member district
- Constituency: Hochtaunus (2011–2013); State list (2013–2017)
- In office 26 January 2000 – 18 October 2005
- Preceded by: Manfred Kanther
- Succeeded by: Multi-member district
- Constituency: State list
- In office 26 February 1996 – 26 October 1998
- Preceded by: Heinz-Adolf Hörsken
- Succeeded by: Norbert Wieczorek
- Constituency: Groß-Gerau

Personal details
- Born: 4 February 1949 (age 77) Lautzenhausen, Germany
- Party: Christian Democratic Union
- Children: 2
- Education: Fulda University of Applied Sciences

Helmut Heiderich (born 4 February 1949) is a German politician of the Christian Democratic Union (CDU), and a member of Bundestag. He sits on the Committee on Budgets as well as the Subcommittee on Issues of the European Union.

In 1967 Heiderich graduated from high school in Bad Hersfeld. In 1972 he graduated from college with a degree in economics. In 1987, Heiderich became a professor in business computer science at Fulda University of Applied Sciences; in 1991, he took a position at the School of E-technologies and in the District Vocational School in Bad Hersfeld.

From 1986, Heiderich was a deputy of the CDU, and in 1992 he was elected chairman of the CDU Hersfeld/Rotenburg. He was elected a member of the German Bundestag from 1996 to 1998 and again from 2000 until 2005. In 2011, Heiderich rejoined parliament. During the 18th Bundestag, he is a deputy member of the Sport Committee.

Heiderich is a Protestant; he is married and has two daughters.
