= Abbacy =

Abbacy may refer to:

- The office of an abbot
- Territorial abbacy, a territorial jurisdiction in the Catholic church
- Prince-abbacy, secular territory ruled by an abbot
