= Friedrich Münter =

German-Danish theologian (1761–1830)

- Bishop of Zealand
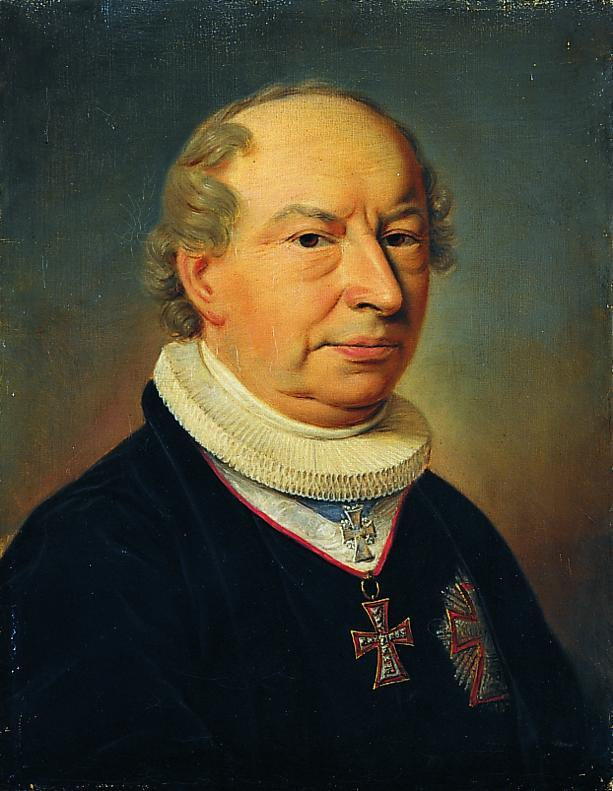
- Portrait by Christian Albrecht Jensen and Christian Horneman
- Church: Church of Denmark
- Diocese: Diocese of Zealand
- In office: 1808–1830
- Predecessor: Nicolai Edinger Balle
- Successor: Peter Erasmus Müller

Personal details
- Born: October 14, 1761 Gotha, Thuringia
- Died: April 9, 1830 (aged 68) Copenhagen, Denmark
- Denomination: Lutheranism
- Education: University of Göttingen; University of Fulda

Friedrich Christian Carl Heinrich Münter (14 October 1761 – 9 April 1830) was a German-Danish scholar, theologian, and Bishop of Zealand from 1808 until his death. His name has also been recorded as Friederich Münter.

In addition to his position as the Bishop of Zealand within the Church of Denmark, Münter was also a professor of theology at the University of Copenhagen, an orientalist, church historian, archaeologist, and freemason.

== Personal life ==
Friedrich Münter was born on 14 October 1761 in Gotha to Balthasar Münter, a clergyman. His father moved with his family to Copenhagen in 1765 to become vicar at St. Peter's Church. While in Copenhagen, Friedrich was privately tutored at the vicarage and enjoyed the company of many of his father's renowned acquaintances including the archaeologist Carsten Niebuhr, professor of theology Johann Andreas Cramer, and the poets Friedrich Gottlieb Klopstock and Heinrich Wilhelm von Gerstenberg. Münter's sister, Sophie Christiane Friederike Brun was a renowned author and member of the upper class.

In 1791, he married Maria Elisabeth Krohn (1771–1842). Their first son, Balthasar (1794–1867), was born in Copenhagen and became a pastor. Their second son, Carl Vilhelm Theodor Münter (1798–1841), was a public servant. Their daughter, Maria Frederica Franzisca Münter (1796-1871), went by the name "Fanny." In 1815, Fanny married Jacob Peter Mynster who went on to become bishop of Zealand four years after Münter's death.

== Career ==
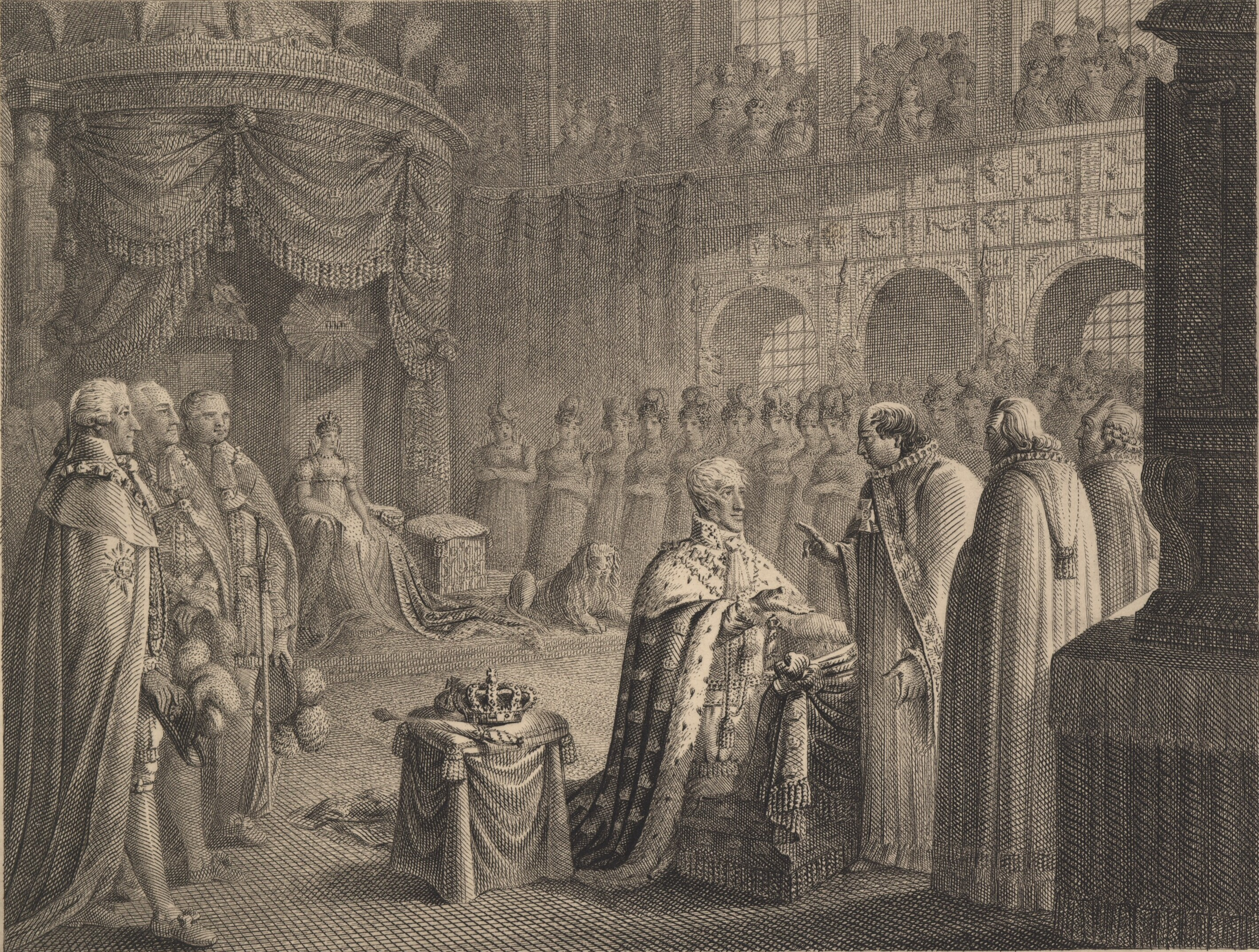
Münter 's anointment of the king in 1817

In 1781 he began his studies at the University of Göttingen, and in 1784 he was the first Protestant to receive a doctorate of philosophy from the University of Fulda. Afterwards, King Christian VII of Denmark sent him to Italy and Sicily to continue his education. In Rome, Münter had contact with Stefano Borgia, who later became cardinal. There he learned the Coptic language. In 1787 he returned to Copenhagen and became a professor at the University of Copenhagen.

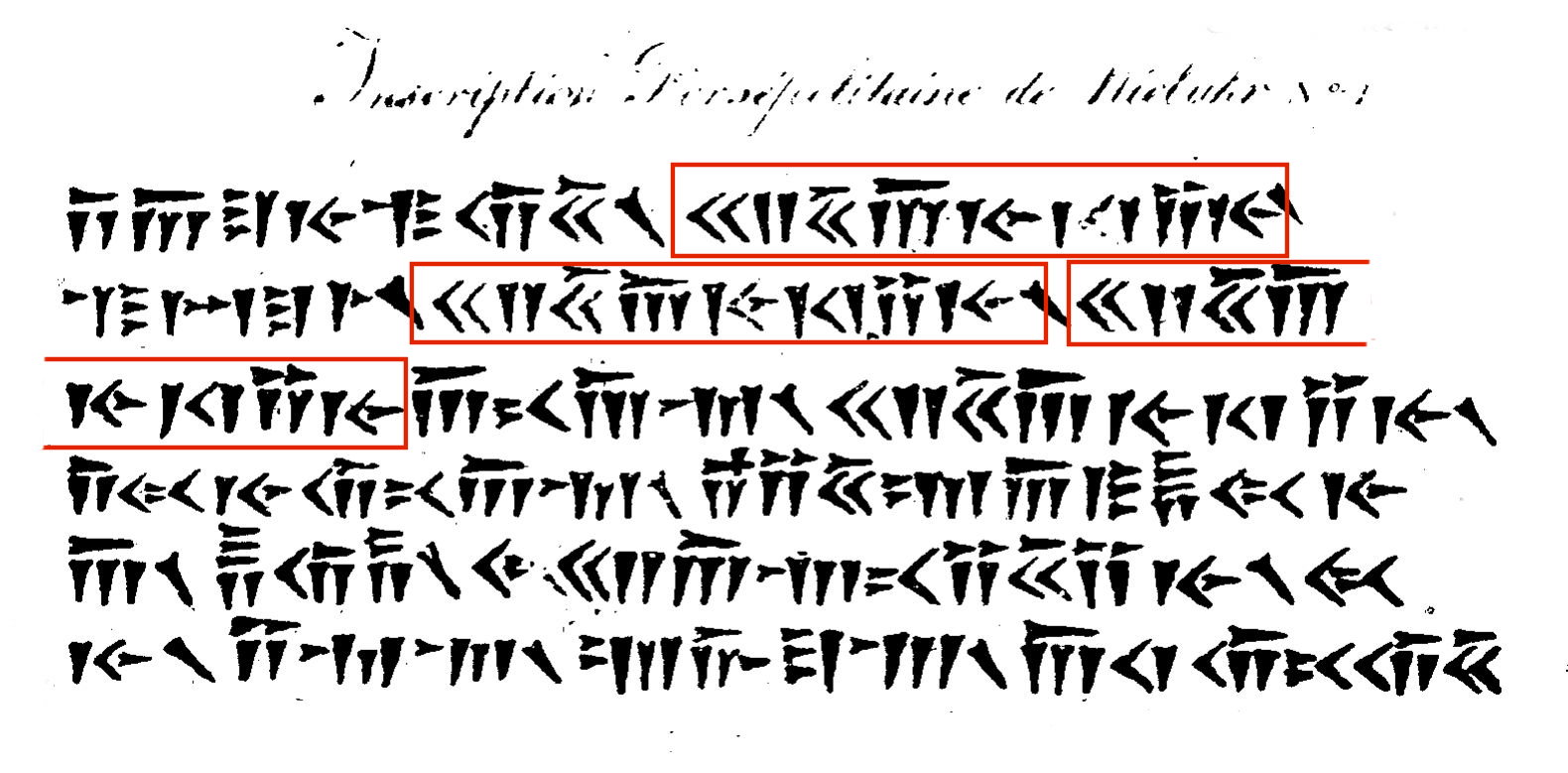
A Persepolis inscription of Darius the Great, with the word sequence "𐎧𐏁𐎠𐎹𐎰𐎡𐎹" appearing several times (highlighted), and correctly identified by Münter as meaning "King".

Münter collated and described manuscripts housed in notable Italian libraries. He collated Codex Nanianus for the first time and he sent some extracts from this codex to Andreas Birch. Birch used these extracts in his edition of the text of the four Gospels in Greek. Münter also studied inscriptions from Persepolis, and played an important early part in the decipherment of cuneiform scripts. He discovered that the words in the inscriptions were divided from one another by an oblique wedge (𐏐) and that the monuments must belong to the age of Cyrus and his successors. One word (𐎧𐏁𐎠𐎹𐎰𐎡𐎹), which occurs without any variation towards the beginning of each inscription, he correctly inferred to signify "king". These findings were fundamental to the decipherment of Old Persian cuneiform by Grotefend in 1802.

Münter's main work is "Religion der Karthager" (Copenhagen, 1816). The second edition (1821) was expanded and included new research. Other works include "Sendschreiben an Kreuzer über Sardische Idole" (Copenhagen, 1822), "Der Tempel der himmlichen Göttin zu Paphos" (Copenhagen, 1824), and "Religion der Babylonier" (Copenhagen, 1827). Some small archaeological works of Münter were included in his "Antiquarische Abhandlungen" (Copenhagen, 1816).

On numismatics Münter wrote: "De numo plumbео Zenobiae reginae Orientis et aeneo Palmyreno" (Petersburg, 1823) and "Ueber die Münzen der Vandalischen Könige von Karthago" ("Antiquarische Abhandlungen", p. 301).

In 1829, he was elected a member to the American Philosophical Society.

== Works ==
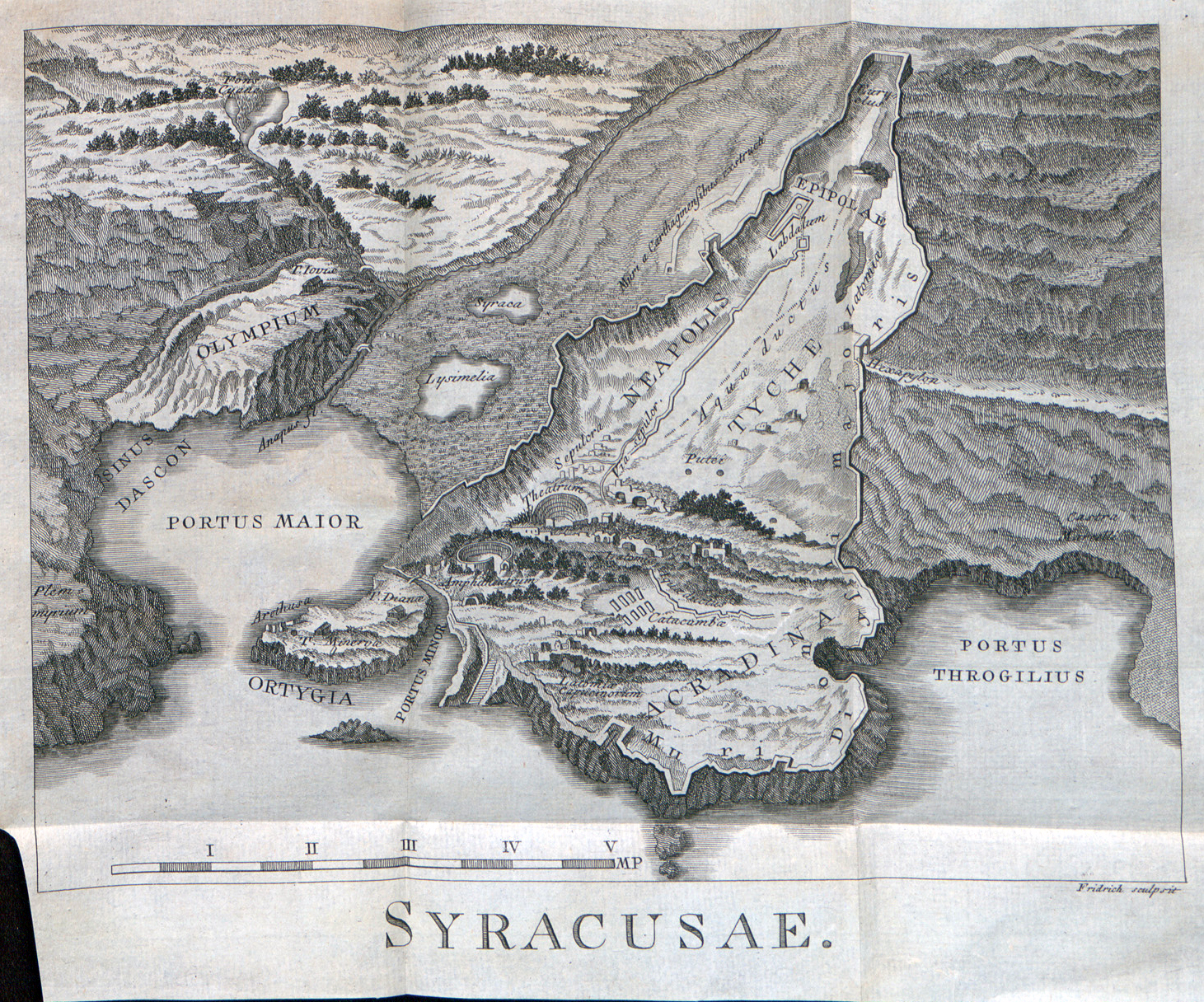
Syracuse's map, in Efterretninger om begge Sicilierne (1790)

- Sinnbilder und Kunstvorstellungen der alten Christen (1825)
- Betrachtung über die natürliche Religion (1805)
- De aetate versionum Novi Testamenti copticorum (1790)
- Dr. Balthasar Münters Leben und Charakteristik (1793)
- Nachrichten über beide Sizilien (1790)
- Efterretninger om begge Sicilierne (1790)
- Statutenbuch des Ordens der Tempelherren (1794)
- Vermischte Beyträge zur Kirchengeschichte (1798)
- Die Offenbarung Johannis metrisch ins Deutsche übersetzt (1784)
- Fragmenta Patrum Graecorum edidit & illustr (1788)
