= Appleton Log Hall =

- U.S. National Register of Historic Places
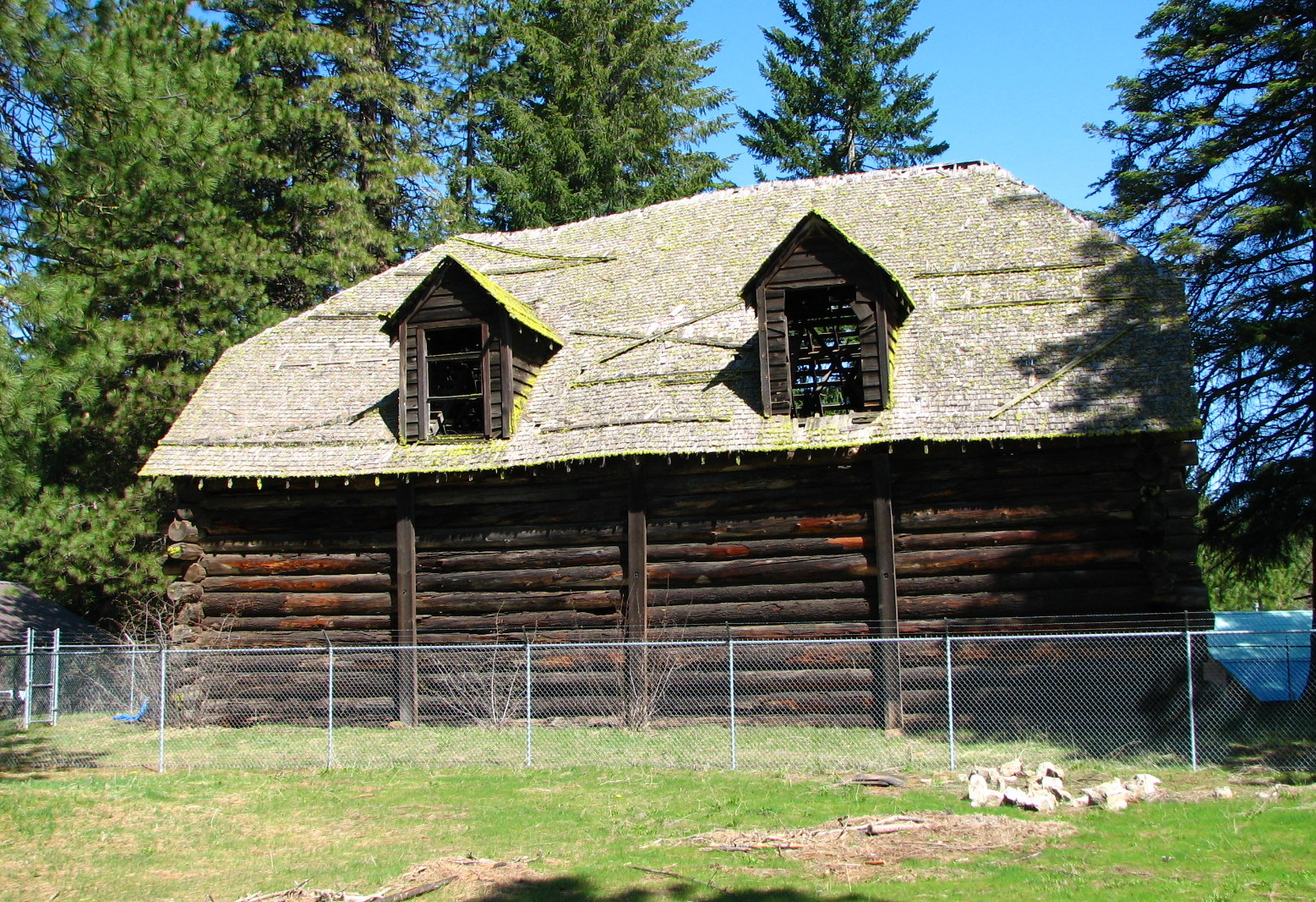
- Side of hall in 2009

- Location within Washington (state) Location within the United States
- Location: 835 Appleton Rd., Appleton, Washington
- Coordinates: 45°48′36″N 121°16′30″W
- Area: 6 acres (2.4 ha)
- Built: 1912
- Architectural style: Rustic
- NRHP reference No.: 92001294
- Added to NRHP: 2 October 1992

The Appleton Log Hall is a historic meeting hall in Appleton, a community in Klickitat County, Washington, United States.

== Description and history ==
Located at 835 Appleton Road the massive one and a half story log and timber frame building was erected in 1912. The rectangular plan structure is 62 by 41 feet (19 by 12 m) with the south facing facade on the long side and entries on either end. It was added to the National Register of Historic Places on October 2, 1992, but has since collapsed.

== Photo gallery ==
Photographs of Appleton Log Hall
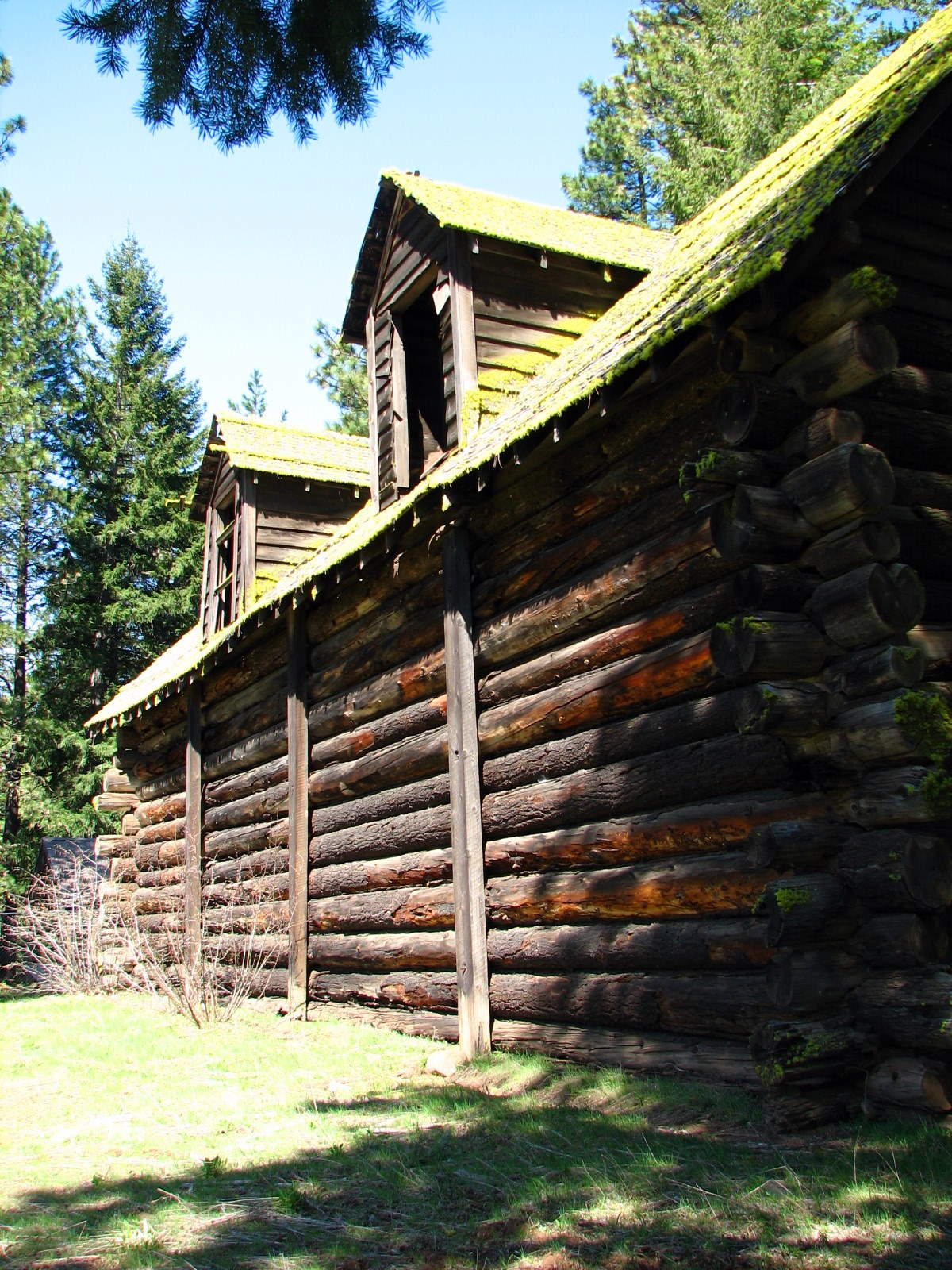
Side of building from corner

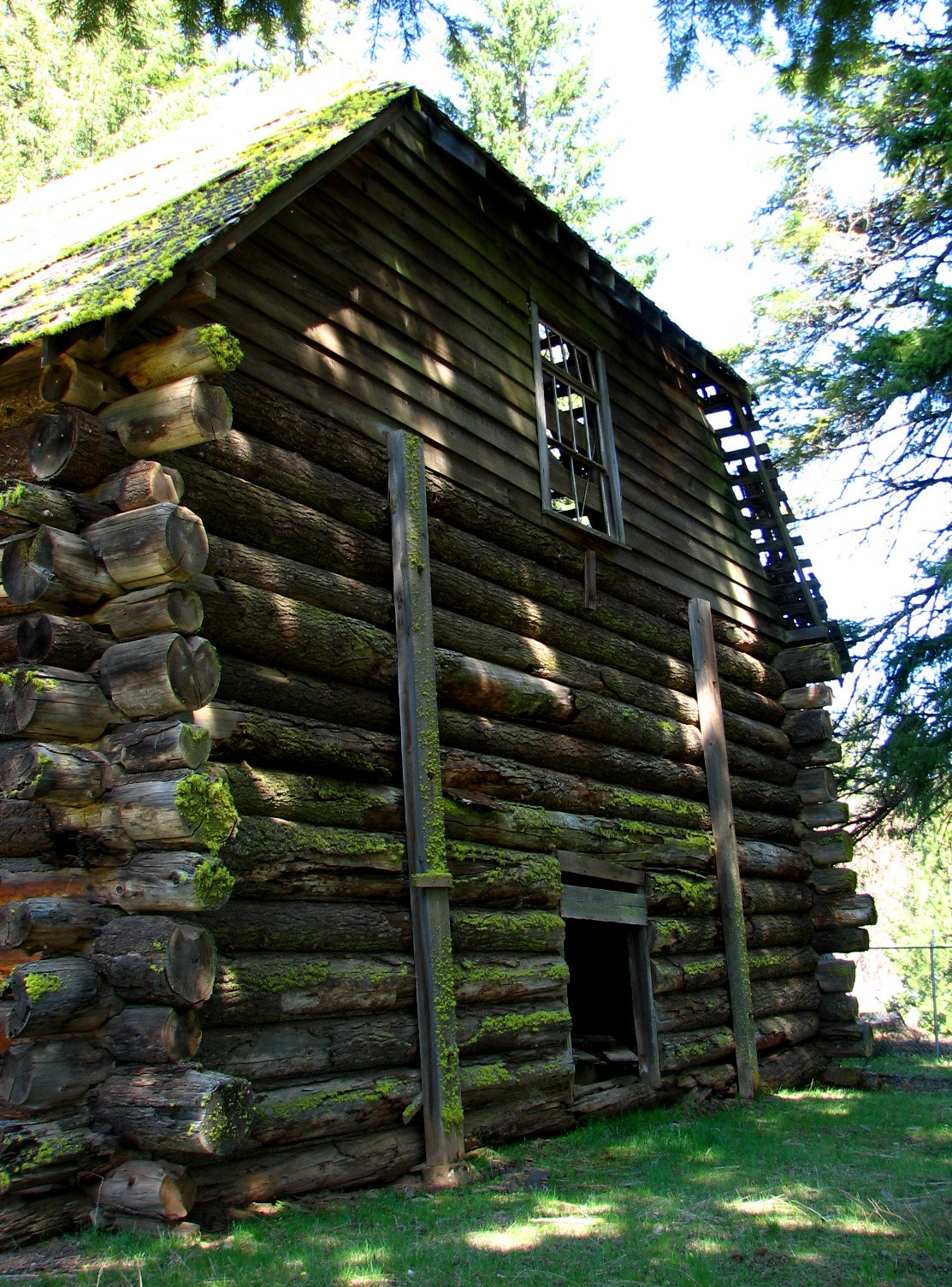
End of hall from corner

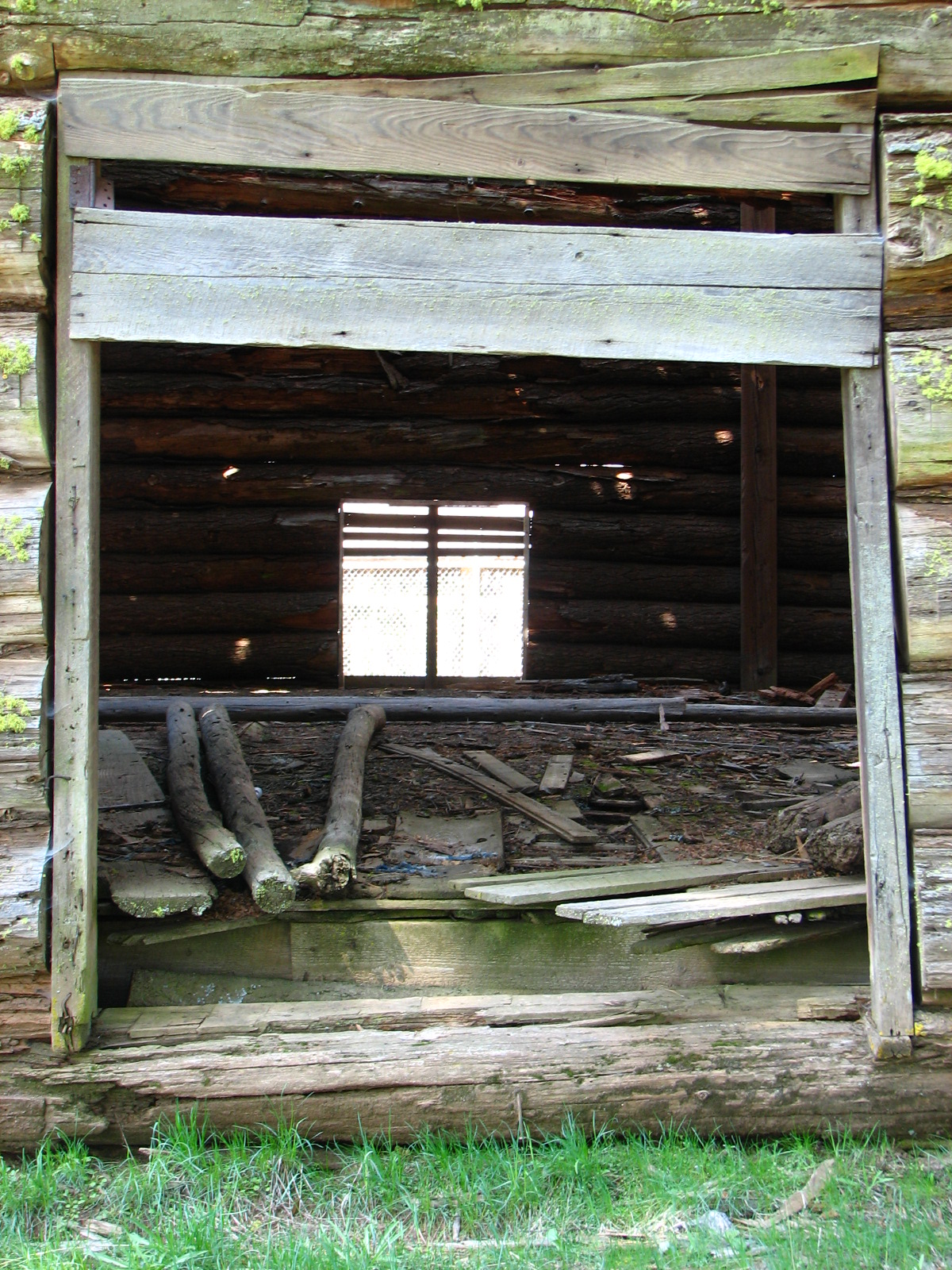
Detail of doorway
Photography Ian Poellet 2009
