= National Register of Historic Places listings in Skamania County, Washington =

Location of Skamania County in Washington

This list presents the full set of buildings, structures, objects, sites, or districts designated on the National Register of Historic Places in Skamania County, Washington, and offers brief descriptive information about each of them. The National Register recognizes places of national, state, or local historic significance across the United States. Out of over 90,000 National Register sites nationwide, Washington is home to approximately 1,500, and 6 of those are found partially or wholly in Skamania County.

This National Park Service list is complete through NPS recent listings posted March 21, 2025.

== Current listings ==
	Name on the Register	Image	Date listed	Location	City or town	Description
1	Bonneville Dam Historic District	Bonneville Dam Historic District	April 9, 1986 (#86000727)	Spanning the Columbia River between Bradford and Cascade Islands; 45°38′29″N 121°56′36″W	North Bonneville	Built in the 1930s to harness the Columbia River for power generation, this was the first hydroelectric dam with a hydraulic drop sufficient to produce 500,000 kW of hydropower. The NHL district covers the dam and other elements of the federal dam project, including the #1 powerhouse, navigation lock, fish ladder, and hatchery. The site is also listed in Oregon.
2	Government Mineral Springs Guard Station	Government Mineral Springs Guard Station	December 26, 2017 (#100001939)	End of FS Rd. 3065 off of Wind R. Hwy., Mt. Adams Ranger District; 45°52′55″N 121°59′43″W	Gifford Pinchot National Forest	
3	Lawetlat'la	Lawetlat'la	September 11, 2013 (#13000748)	Gifford Pinchot National Forest; 46°11′28″N 122°11′40″W	Cougar vicinity	
4	North Bonneville Archeological District	North Bonneville Archeological District	February 2, 1987 (#87000498)	Address restricted	North Bonneville	Boulder from the site at the county courthouse
5	Region Six Personnel Training Station	Region Six Personnel Training Station	August 28, 2007 (#07000895)	Wind River Work Center; 1262 Hemlock Road; 45°48′07″N 121°55′46″W	Gifford Pinchot National Forest	
6	Edward and Isabelle Underwood Farm – Five Oaks Farm	Edward and Isabelle Underwood Farm – Five Oaks Farm	January 10, 2008 (#07001387)	851 Orchard Lane; 45°44′39″N 121°31′54″W	Underwood	

== See also ==
- National Register of Historic Places listings in Washington state
- Listings in neighboring counties: Clark, Cowlitz, Hood River, Klickitat, Lewis, Multnomah, Yakima
- List of National Historic Landmarks in Washington (state)
- Historic preservation
- History of Washington (state)
- Index of Washington (state)-related articles
