= Adolphus von Dalberg =

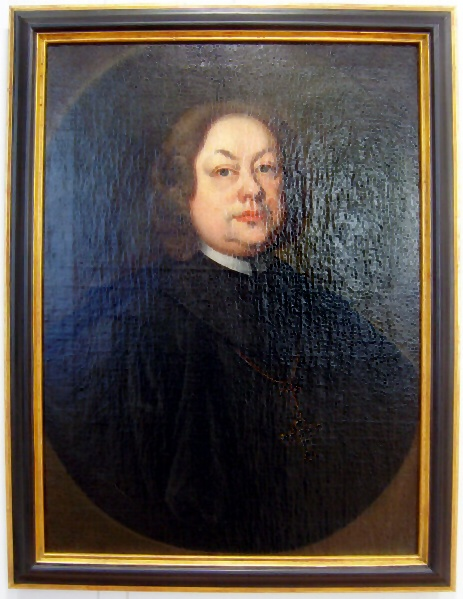
- Title: Prince-abbot

Personal life
- Born: 29 May 1678 Fulda, Germany
- Died: 3 November 1737 (aged 59) Hammelburg, Germany

Religious life
- Religion: Christianity
- Denomination: Catholic
- Order: Benedictine

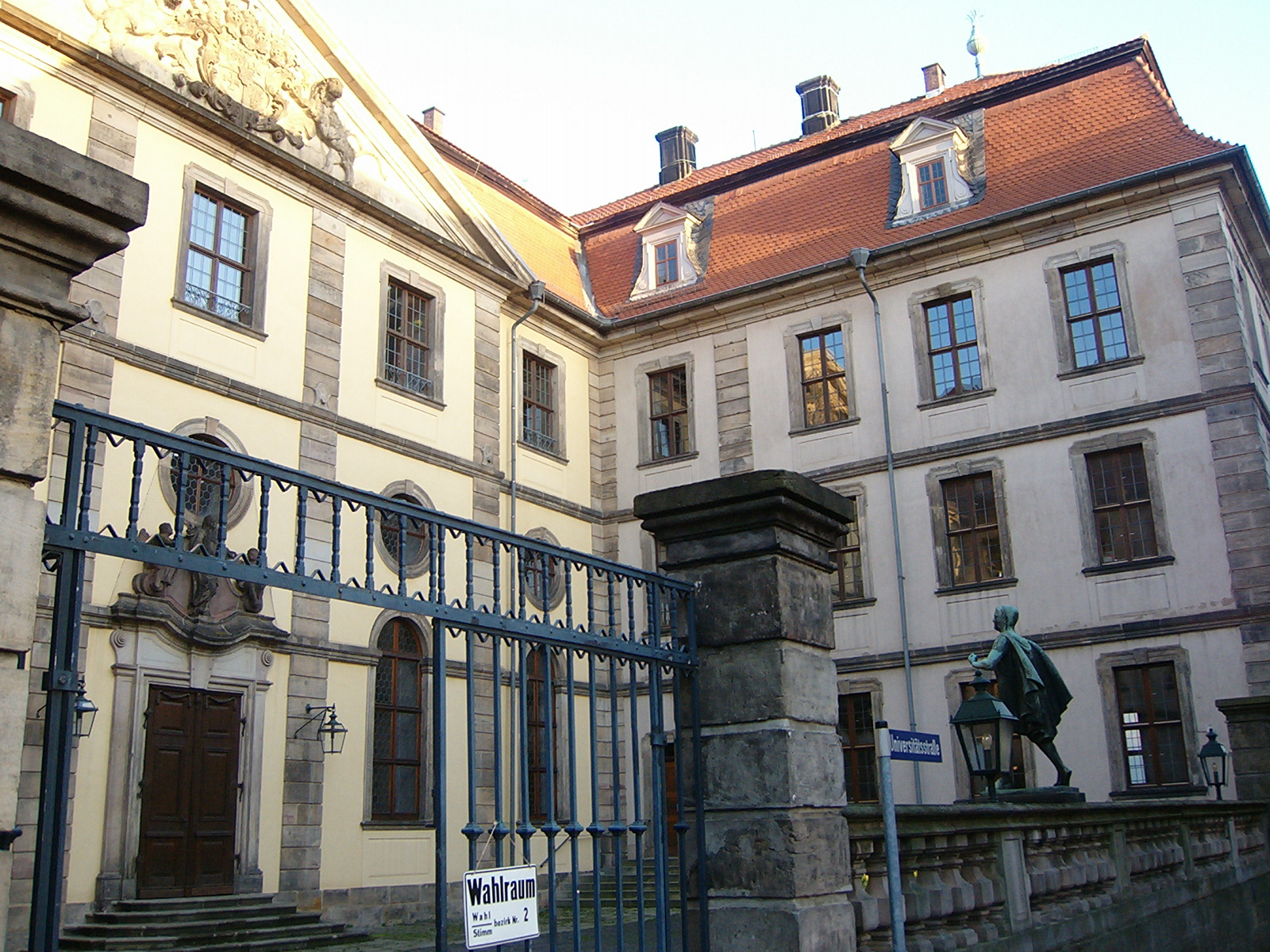
University Fulda (Today: von-Dalberg-Schule)

Adolphus von Dalberg (29 May 1678 – 3 November 1737) was a German Benedictine prince-abbot of Fulda Abbey and founder of the former University of Fulda.

== Biography ==
Adolphus von Dalberg, born into a long-established noble family of southern Germany, after holding the office of provost at Celle in Hanover for some years, was elected prince-abbot of the Benedictine Fulda Abbey in 1724.

Though not a bishop, Dalberg had quasi-episcopal jurisdiction on the territory belonging to the abbey and held a diocesan synod in 1729. This privilege of quasi-episcopal jurisdiction was granted to the abbots of Fulda by Pope Zachary in 751.

Dalberg spared no pains to improve the Roman Catholic educational facilities of Fulda. Its once famous school, which had suffered severely during the religious upheaval of the sixteenth century, had regained some of its ancient prestige by the united efforts of the Jesuits and Benedictines. Dalberg hoped to restore in all its splendour the ancient seat of learning which had made Fulda world-renowned during the Middle Ages.

With this end in view he founded a university at Fulda which came to be known after his own name as the Alma Adolphina. The faculties of philosophy and theology he formed by united the two existing schools of the Jesuits and the Benedictines; for the new faculties of jurisprudence and medicine he engaged other professors. Pope Clement XII granted the charter of foundation on 1 July 1732, and Emperor Charles VI, the charter of confirmation on 12 March 1733. The solemn inauguration of the university took place on 19 September 1733.

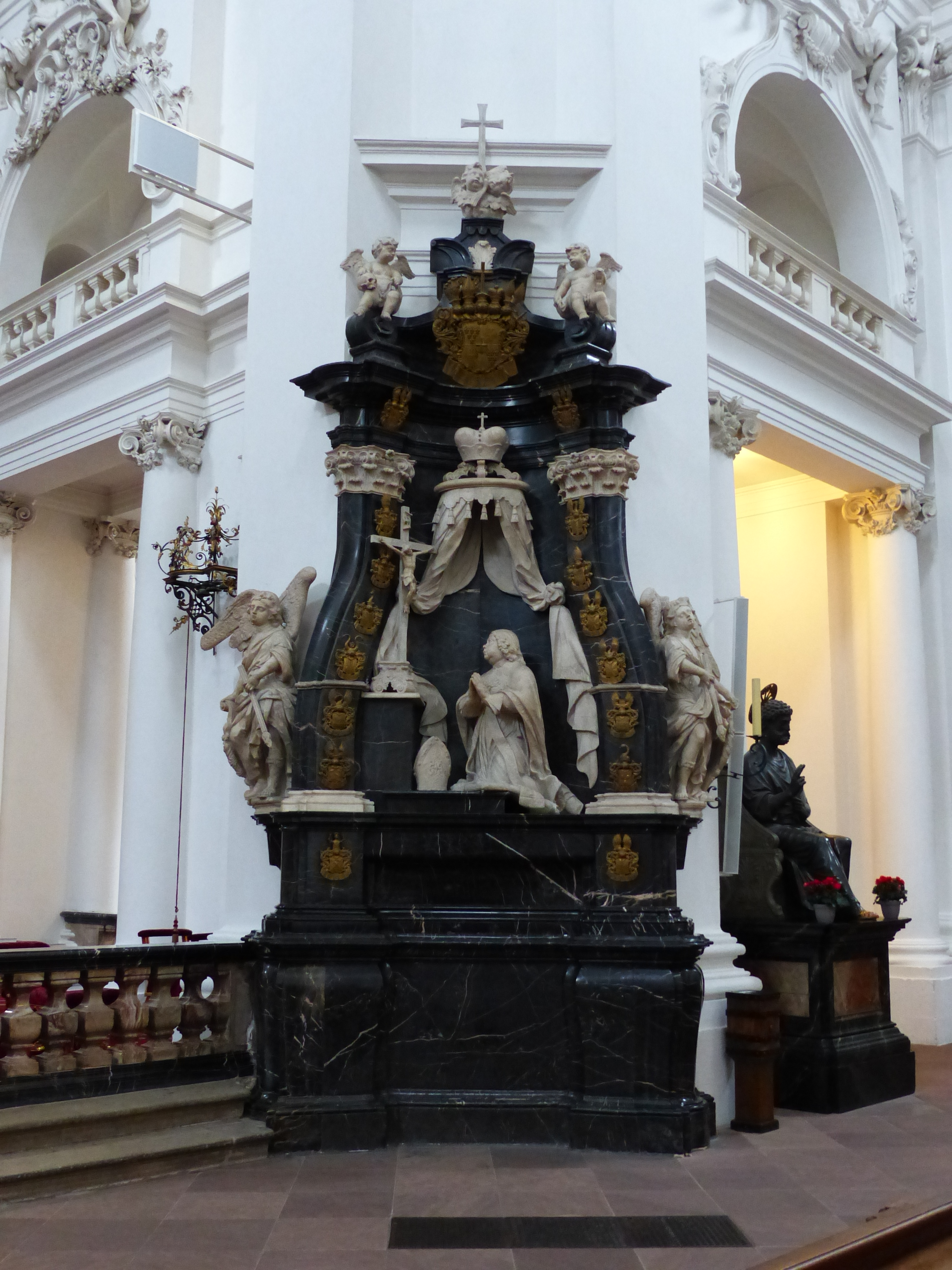
His epitaph already in 1732 in the Fulda Cathedral.

Adolphus von Dalberg died on 3 November 1737 at Hammelburg in Lower Franconia.

His foundation, the Adolphina, was however not destined to be of long duration. After the suppression of the Jesuit Order by Pope Clement XIV in 1773 the university came entirely into the hands of the Benedictines, who were finally obliged to discontinue it in 1805, in consequence of the Napoleonic secularization of Fulda Abbey in 1802.
