= Trout Lake Tourist Club =

- Trout Lake Hall
- U.S. National Register of Historic Places
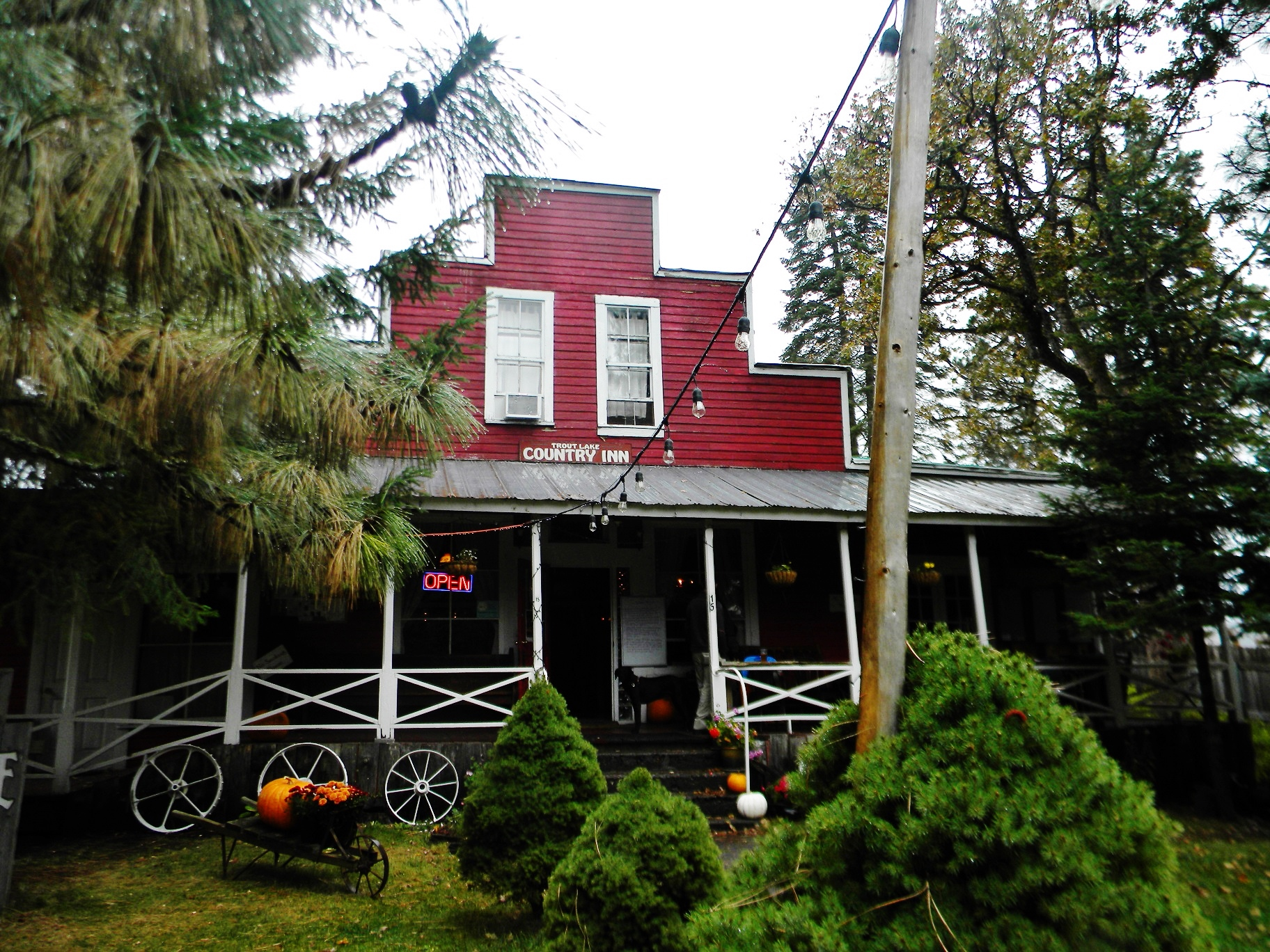
- The Trout Lake Hall (then the Trout Lake Country Inn) as it was in October of 2015.

- Location within Washington (state) Location within the United States
- Location: 15 Guler Rd., Trout Lake, Washington
- Coordinates: 46°0′15″N 121°32′22″W
- Area: less than one acre
- Built: 1904
- Architectural style: Western false front
- NRHP reference No.: 05001063
- Added to NRHP: September 21, 2005

The Trout Lake Hall, formerly known as the Trout Lake Tourist Club, the Trout Lake Tavern, and until its purchase in 2022, the Trout Lake Country Inn, is a restaurant, music venue, and wedding venue located in Trout Lake, Washington, that serves the local community and is a gathering place for both Trout Lakers and tourists alike. The Hall was listed on the National Register of Historic Places as the Trout Lake Tourist Club in 2005.

== History ==
It was constructed in 1904 by Swiss immigrant Christian Guler after his 1887 arrival in Trout Lake and his 1902 purchase of the Stoller family farm from the aforementioned Stollers, also of Swiss origin. Prior to 1904, it was on the same land as the Guler Hotel, which would then give way for the construction of what was known as the Tourist Club. It was the terminus for four horse stages each day between White Salmon and Trout Lake, and for decades, the hotel was filled to capacity with fishermen and campers either set up tents along the creek or nearby. Christian Guler and other locals would help to build up the tourist trade and advertised the valley and the Club throughout the northwest.

The Hall has also been known as Doodle’s Place and Thode's Hall amongst the other aforementioned names.

The building itself is a 1 1/2-story 98 feet (30 m) by 52 feet (16 m) building with a false front., and at one point housed a post office that closed in 1936. The Hall also houses a local coffee shop, called Post Office Coffee, named for the former post office.
