= Fulda University of Applied Sciences =

Coordinates: 50°33′53″N 9°41′15″E

- Hochschule Fulda – University of Applied Sciences
- Type: Public University System
- Established: 1974
- Chancellor: Carsten Feller
- President: Karim Khakzar
- Faculty: 147
- Students: 7,637
- Location: Marquardstraße 35, D-36039 Fulda, Fulda, Fulda district, Hesse, Germany
- Colors: Green and white
- Website: www.hs-fulda.de

Fulda University of Applied Sciences (officially named Hochschule Fulda – University of Applied Sciences) is located in the city of Fulda, within the Fulda district of Hesse, southwest Germany.

Formerly known as Fachhochschule Fulda, it was founded as the fifth state University of Applied Sciences in Hesse in 1974. Today, Fulda University of Applied Sciences is the first German University of Applied Sciences to have been conferred the right to award PhD degrees.

== History ==
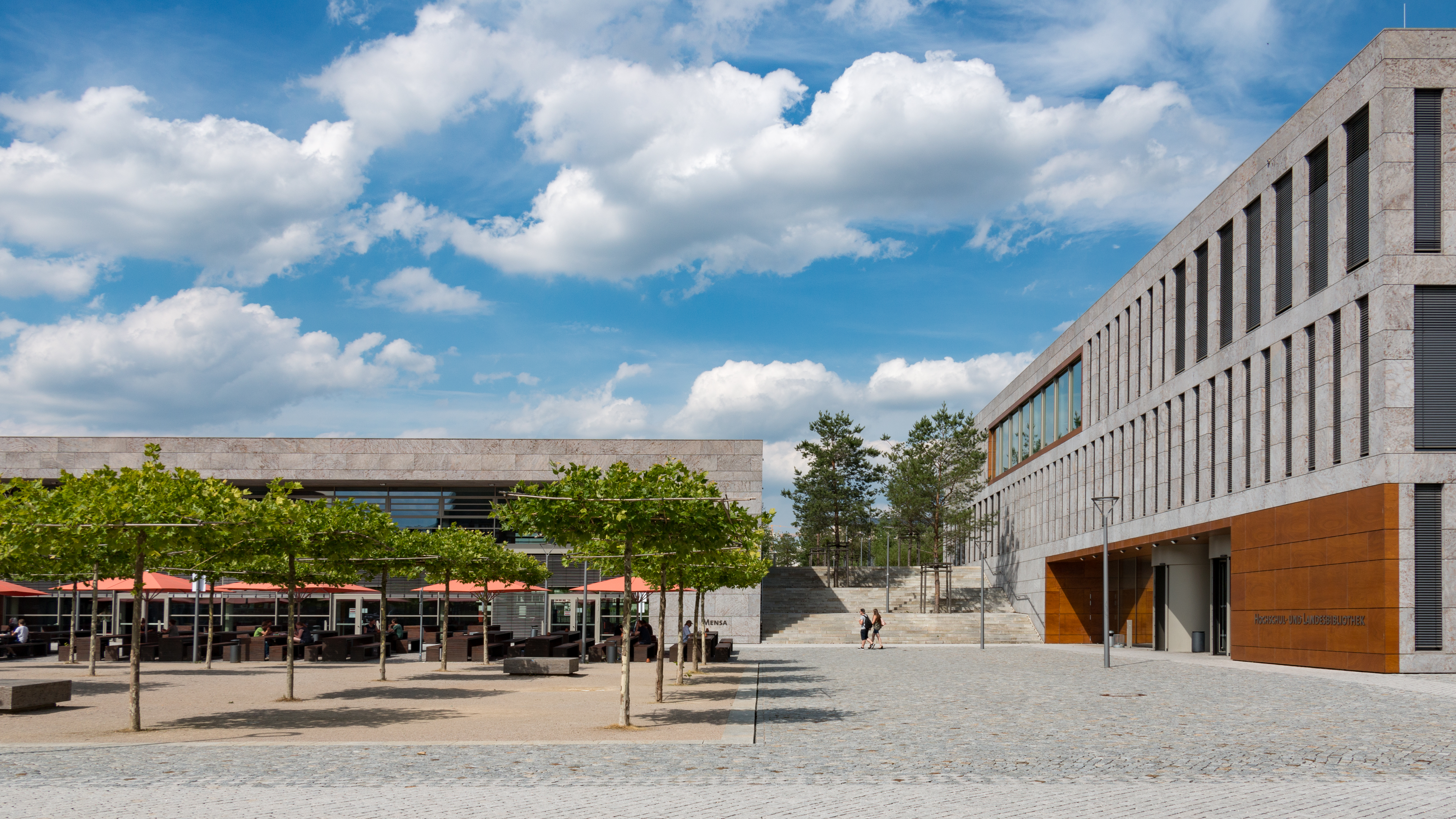
Library & dining hall on the campus.

Established in 1971, the college was part of the University of Applied Sciences Gießen, until the location became an independent institution in 1974.

In 2006, the university was renamed Hochschule Fulda - University of Applied Sciences due to the restructuring of German and European higher education under the Bologna process. Students at the university can now obtain state-accredited Bachelor, Master, and, as of 2016, also Doctoral degrees.

== Faculties and study paths ==
- Business Administration
- Electrical Engineering & Information Technology
- Food Technology
- Nursing & Health Sciences
- Nutritional Science
- Social & Cultural Science
- Social Work
- Social Sciences (PhD)
- Public Health (PhD)

== See also ==
- Fulda University
- Buildings and structures in Fulda (district)
