= Anne Fulda =

French journalist (born 1963)

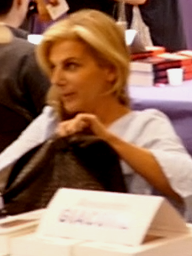
- Anne Fulda in 2016
- Born: 10 May 1963 (age 63); Paris, France
- Education: Sciences Po
- Occupations: Journalist Le Figaro; Presenter of L'heure des livres on CNews
- Spouse: Alain Cadier (m. 1992; div. 2007)
- Children: 2

Anne Fulda (born 10 May 1963) is a French journalist working for Le Figaro in the politics department since 1992. She is a specialist of French politics and in particular of French right-wing politics. She wrote a book about Jacques Chirac in 1997. She was allegedly the mistress of the former French President Nicolas Sarkozy from 2005 to 2006.

== Bibliography ==
- Un président très entouré (1997) - Grasset ISBN 2-246-52531-4
- François Baroin, le faux discret (2012) - Paris, Lattès
- Portraits de femmes (2016) - Paris, Plon
- Emmanuel Macron, un jeune homme si parfait (2017) - Plon
- Mes très chers monstres (2020) - Éditions de l'Observatoire
- Invincibles, derrière le sourire, le combat d'une vie (2020) written with Olivier Goy - Éditions de l'Observatoire

== Articles ==
- Les vacances de M. le President
