= University of Fulda =

Coordinates: 50°33′06″N 9°40′45″E

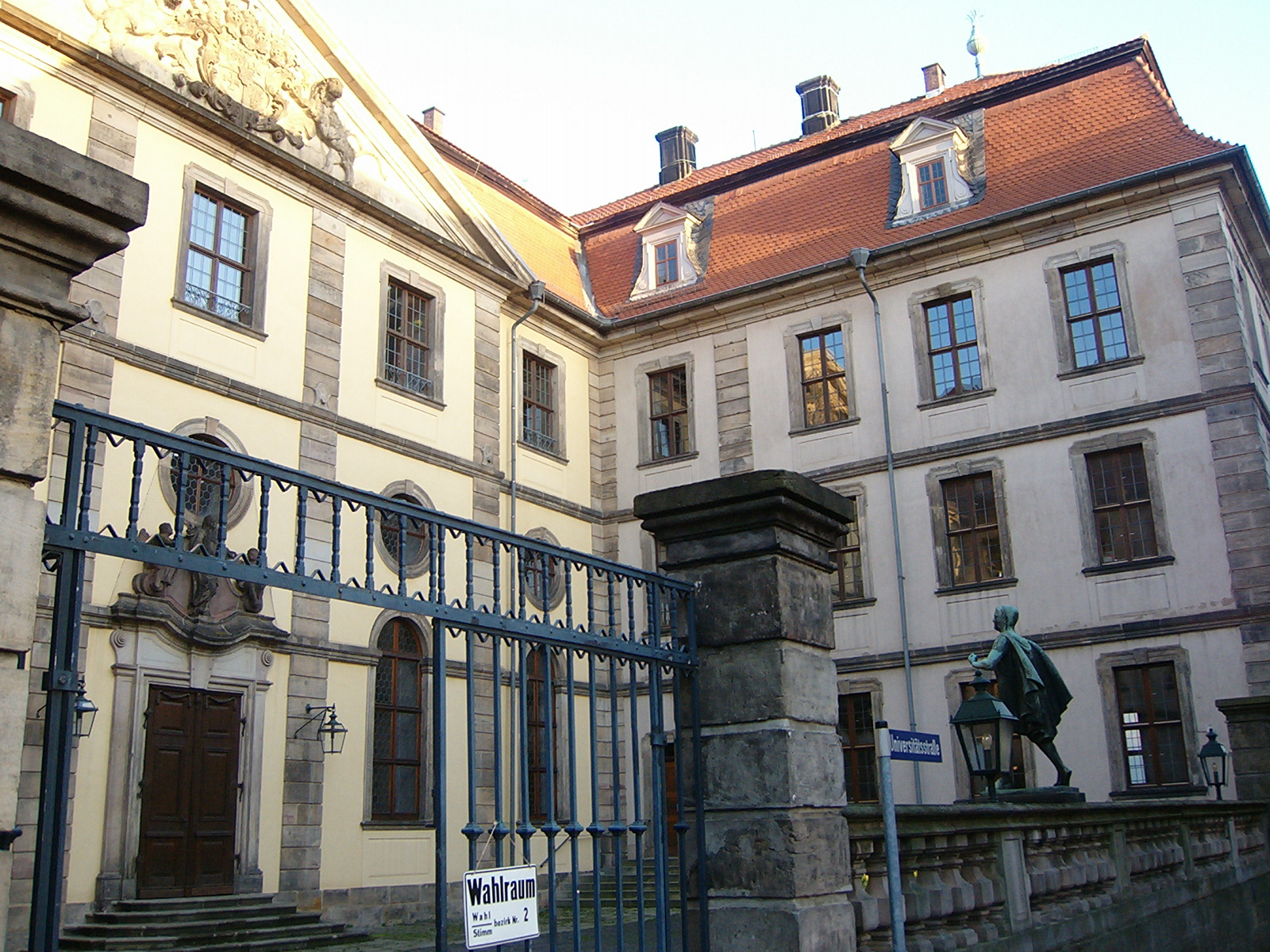
Old University of Fulda

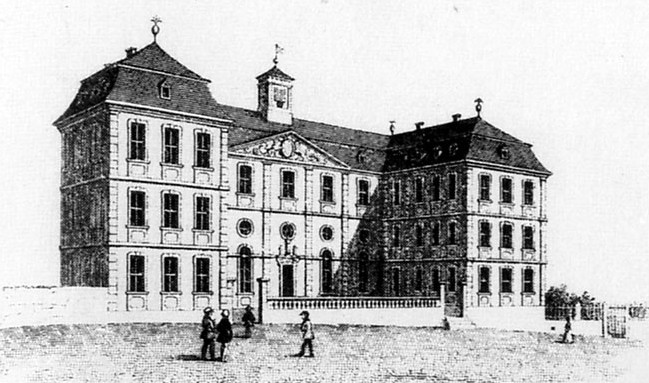
Old University, 1840

The University of Fulda (also: Alma mater Adolphiana) was founded in 1734 by Adolphus von Dalberg and existed until 1805. Most of the students and professors were Catholic. Under Prince-Bishop Heinrich von Bibra Protestants were also admitted; from 1777, with the sole exception of the theological faculty, a Protestant could acquire a degree in any faculty of the university.

During 71 years of its existence the university had about 4100 students. 935 of them came from the town of Fulda and approximately 400 from the area of the later circles Fulda. Most of foreign students came from France, Nassau and Westphalia or from the enclaves in Hessen and Thuringia.

At the beginning the university had four faculties: Theology, philosophy, medicine and law. In the beginning the chairs of the theology faculty have been taken by Jesuits – up to abolition of the Jesuit Order in Fulda in 1773 – as well as by Benedictines. After the suppression of the Jesuit Order by Pope Clement XIV in 1773 the university came entirely into the hands of the Benedictines, who were finally obliged to discontinue it in 1805, in consequence of the Napoleonic secularization of Fulda Abbey in 1802.

The baroque building was constructed from 1731 to 1734 according to the plans of the court architect Andreas Gallasini. The assembly hall of the old university was served in 1803-1902 as a Protestant church, today can be used for festive arrangements.

The university was closed in 1805 by the sovereign of the secularized Fulda, William I of the Netherlands.

== Notable alumni ==
- Amand von Buseck (1685–1756), Director of University of Fulda (1736)
- Anselm Erb (1688–1767), Prof. Dr. jur. can.
- Heinrich von Bibra (1711–1788),
- Karl von Piesport (1716–1800), Prof. Dr. theol., Theologian and Philosopher, Benedictine
- Sturmius Bruns (1749–1779), Prof. Dr. theol., Professor Orientalist (1773), Professor and Doctor of Theology (1774)
- Siegmund von Bibra (1750–1803), Theologian
- Benedikt Balthasar Herrlein (1750–1809), Prof. Dr. phil., Catholic Priest
- Johann von Reibelt (born 1752), Dr. theol.
- Friedrich Münter (1761–1830), Prof. Dr. theol., Theologian, Philolog and Bishop
- Ferdinand August von Spiegel (1764–1835)

== See also ==
- Fulda University of Applied Sciences
- List of early modern universities in Europe
- List of Jesuit sites
