= Appleton, Washington =

Unincorporated community in Washington, United States

- Unincorporated community
- Location within Washington (state) Location within the United States
- Coordinates: 45°48′42″N 121°16′16″W
- Country: United States
- State: Washington
- County: Klickitat
- Elevation: 2,320 ft (710 m)
- Time zone: UTC-8 (Pacific (PST))
  - Summer (DST): UTC-7 (PDT)
- ZIP code: 98602
- Area code: 509
- GNIS feature ID: 1515932

Appleton is an unincorporated community in Klickitat County, Washington, United States. Appleton is 5.5 miles (8.9 km) west of Klickitat. Appleton has a post office with ZIP code 98602.

The climate is cooler than lowland areas but still fits in the pattern of humid continental.
