= First Day Advent Christian Church =

Historic church in Washington, United States

- U.S. National Register of Historic Places
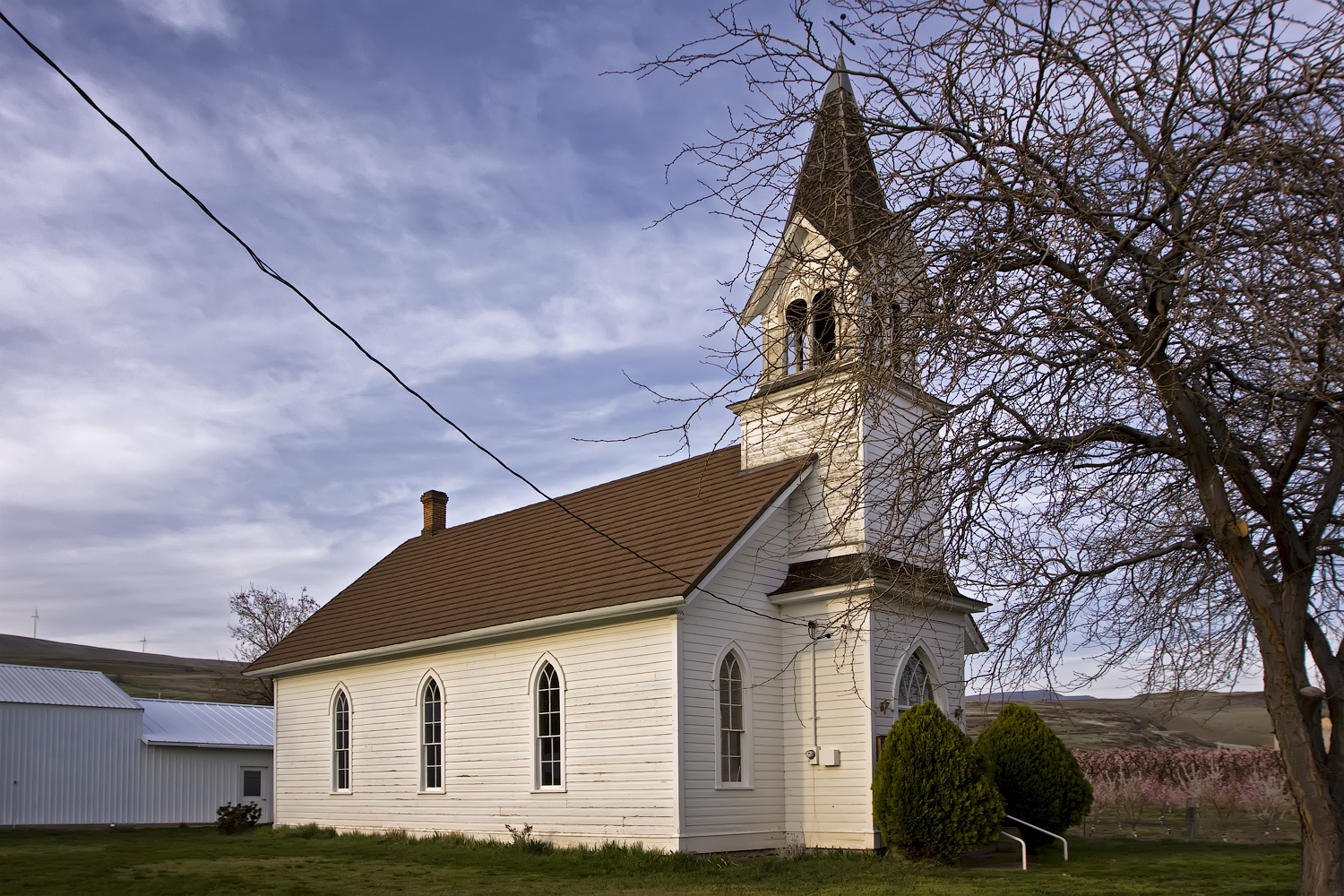

- Location within Washington (state)
- Location: Jct. of Maryhill Hwy. and Stonehenge Ave., Maryhill, Washington
- Coordinates: 45°41′14″N 120°48′47″W
- Area: less than one acre
- Built by: Charles E. Bennett, John Bennett
- Architectural style: Late Victorian, Gothic Revival
- NRHP reference No.: 91001439
- Added to NRHP: September 26, 1991

First Day Advent Christian Church is a historic church at the junction of Maryhill Hwy. and Stonehenge Avenue in Maryhill, Washington State, United States.

It was built in a Late Victorian/Gothic Revival style and was added to the National Register of Historic Places in 1991.
