= University of Applied Sciences Mittelhessen =

German university of applied sciences

Technische Hochschule Mittelhessen – University of Applied Sciences
- Technische Hochschule Mittelhessen
- Logo
- Former name: Fachhochschule Gießen-Friedberg (University of Applied Sciences)
- Motto: Talente. Technik. Zukunft.
- Motto in English: Talents. Technology. Future.
- Type: State School
- Established: 1971
- Budget: EUR 110.5 million annual budget (2023)
- Chancellor: Olaf Berger
- President: Matthias Willems
- Vice-president: Olaf Berger, Jochen Frey, Peter Hohmann, Dirk Metzger, Katja Specht
- Faculty: 249 professors (2023)
- Administrative staff: 871 (2023)
- Students: 14.928 (winter term 2024/25)
- Doctoral students: 127
- Location: Giessen, Friedberg, and Wetzlar, Hesse, Germany; 50°35′13″N 8°40′59″E
- Colors: Green and Grey
- Nickname: THM
- Website: https://www.thm.de/
- Location within Germany

The Technische Hochschule Mittelhessen University of Applied Sciences (German: Technische Hochschule Mittelhessen; THM) is a German University of Applied Sciences (UAS) (German: Fachhochschule) for bachelor's and master's studies with campuses in the Central Hessian cities of Giessen, Friedberg, and Wetzlar, as well as satellite locations in Bad Hersfeld, Bad Wildungen, Bad Vilbel, Biedenkopf, Limburg an der Lahn, and Frankenberg (Eder). It fulfils an important regional function with its location between the Frankfurt Rhine-Main region, and northern Hesse.

Founded in 1971 as a University of Applied Sciences the THM is one of the younger universities in Hesse. With approximately about 15,000 students over all (winter semester 2024/25) it is the largest of the five public Universities of Applied Sciences in Hesse and the fourth largest in Germany. With its practice-oriented and technical degree courses, the university of applied sciences plays an important role in the traditional economic and knowledge region of Central Hesse. Together with the two universities Philipps-University Marburg and Justus-Liebig-University Giessen, it works in numerous cooperative ventures.

== History ==
=== Giessen ===
==== Trade School ====
The origins of the Technische Hochschule Mittelhessen in Gießen date back to the establishment of the School for Technical Drawing (“Schule für technisches Zeichnen“) on January 14, 1838, by the Darmstadt State Trade Association (“Landesgewerbeverein Darmstadt“). The school was founded to address widespread complaints that craftsmen were unable to read and understand architectural blueprints. Only a month younger than the Technical University (TU) Darmstadt (December 1937), the THM is the second-oldest higher technical educational institution in Hesse. In 1838, a trade school was also established in Gießen, followed by the foundation of the Gießen Trade Association in 1840. Its members included renowned figures such as Justus von Liebig and Hugo von Ritgen. In 1842, the trade school was expanded to include a „Rechenschule für Handwerker“ (arithmetic school for craftsmen), and in 1846, together with the drawing school formed the trade school. Hugo von Ritgen, a professor of architecture and engineering at the University of Gießen and later its rector, took over the leadership of the school in 1878. In 1913, the school was renamed Grand Ducal Trade School – Construction School and added a four-semester mechanical engineering department in 1919. It was renamed multiple times over the years, reflecting expansions and changes in its curriculum.

==== Polytechnic and Engineering School ====
After World War II, the school reopened as the Polytechnicum Gießen on June 6, 1946. By the 1950s, it became the State Engineering School for Mechanical Engineering, Electrical Engineering, and Structural Engineering, offering a six-semester program.

=== Friedberg ===
==== Trade Academy and Polytechnic ====
The Friedberg campus originated from the Trade Academy founded in 1901 by Robert Schmidt. Initially a private institution, it later became a public technical institute, providing training in mechanical engineering, electrical engineering, and civil engineering. The institution State Engineering School Friedberg expanded significantly in the 1920s, despite challenges during economic crises and the world wars.

=== Foundation of the University of Applied Sciences Gießen ===
In 1971, the University of Applied Sciences Gießen was established, merging the State Engineering Schools of Gießen and Friedberg. To reflect the dual-campus system it was renamed as University of Applied Sciences Gießen-Friedberg in 1978.

Both Campuses saw significant expansions, including a new library in Friedberg in 1988 and additional facilities to accommodate the growing number of students.

=== Wetzlar: StudiumPlus Program ===
The Wetzlar campus was established in April 2001 to host StudiumPlus, a dual study program integrating academic and practical training. The program collaborates with the Chamber of Industry and Commerce (IHK) and regional businesses, offering Bachelor's and Master's degrees. StudiumPlus expanded to include satellite locations in Bad Hersfeld, Bad Wildungen, and other cities, following the closure of the „Berufsakademie Nordhessen“. The StudiumPlus program is managed by the Scientific Center for Dual Studies (ZDH) in Wetzlar. With over 1.000 partner companies and organizations, it emphasizes practical and academic integration.

=== Modern developments ===
On April 21, 2010, the university's name was changed from University of Applied Sciences Gießen-Friedberg to Technische Hochschule Mittelhessen to reflect its regional growth and academic advancements.

Since its renaming the university's logo features a binary code represented by eleven squares. Each square encodes information about the university's locations and departments.

== Academic programs ==
THM offers a variety of Bachelor's and Master's degree programs across its campuses. These include fields such as engineering, natural sciences, health sciences, business, and computer science. Notable programs include the first logistics degree program in Germany and the English-taught Master’s program in International Marketing. In 2016, THM became the first University of Applied Sciences to establish an independent doctoral center for engineering, granting it the right to award the degree Doctor of Engineering (Dr.-Ing.).

Research Campus Mittelhessen (German: Forschungscampus) is a cooperation of Justus-Liebig-University Gießen, Philipps-University Marburg and THM.

== Faculties ==
=== Friedberg ===
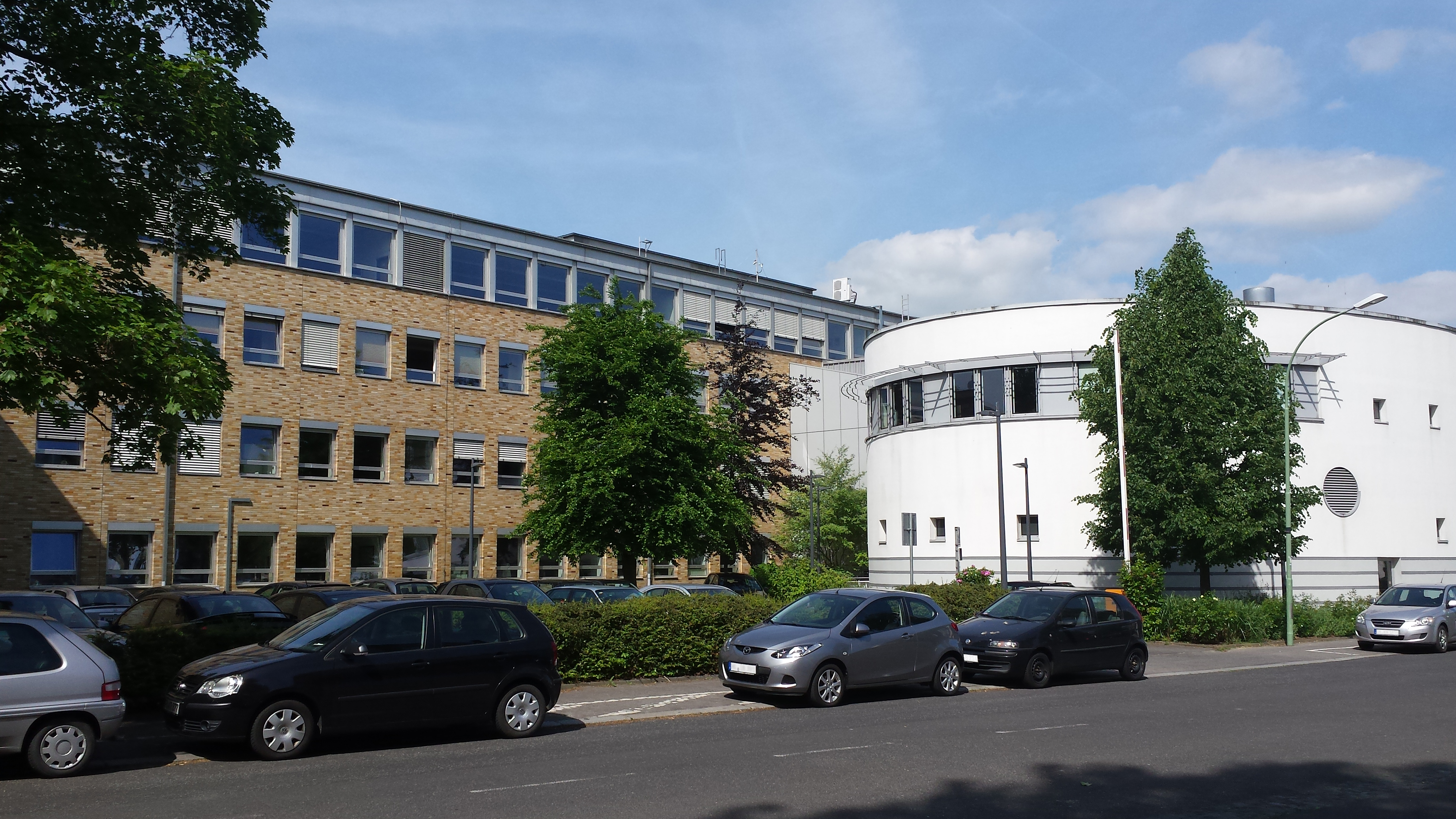
Friedberg Campus

- Information Technology, Electrical Engineering, Mechatronics (Informationstechnik - Elektrotechnik - Mechatronik)
- Mechanical Engineering, Mechatronics, Materials Technology (Maschinenbau, Mechatronik, Materialtechnologie)
- Mathematics, Natural Sciences and Data Processing (Mathematik, Naturwissenschaften und Datenverarbeitung)
- Industrial engineering (Wirtschaftsingenieurwesen)

=== Giessen ===
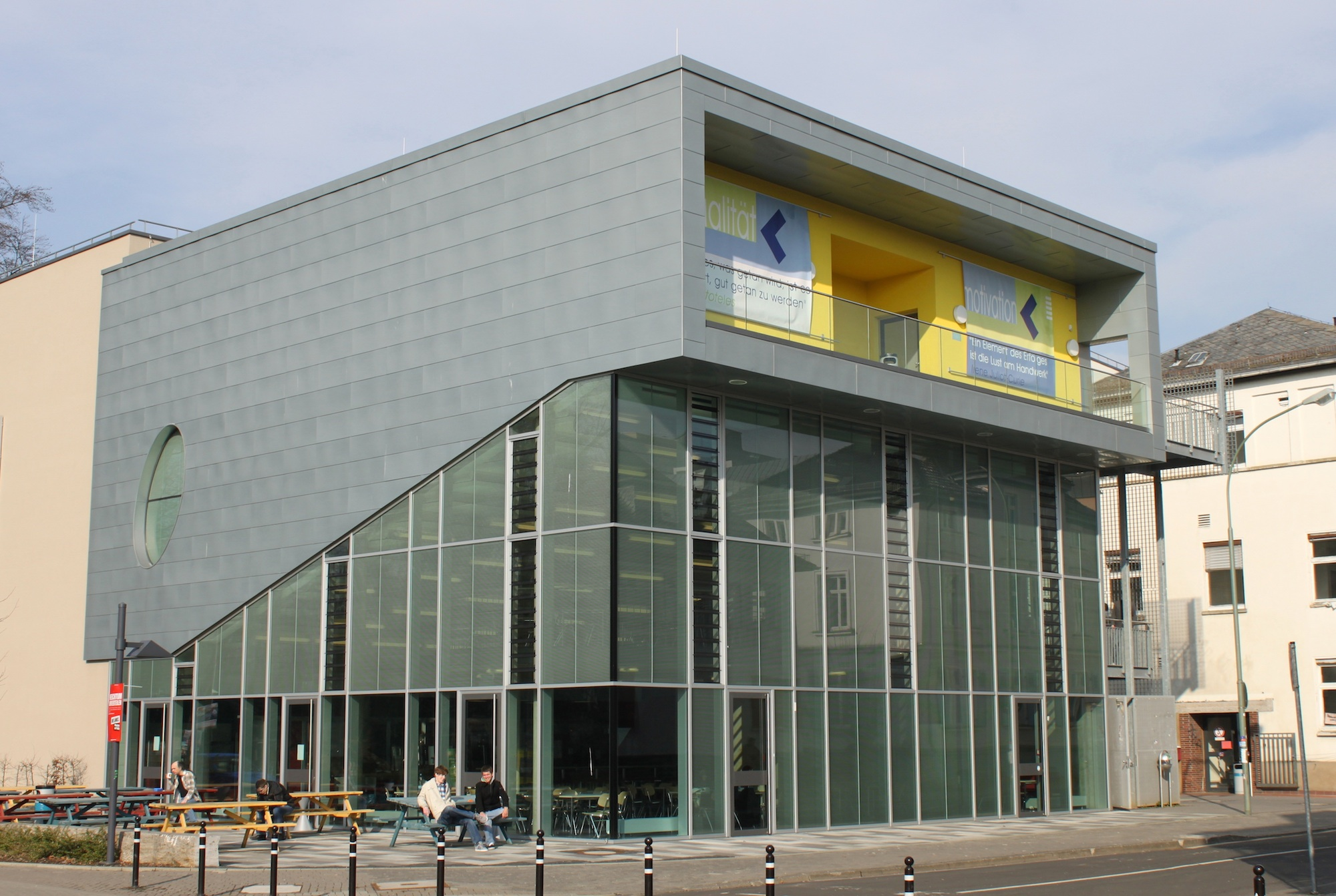
A20 building, Audimax, and "Café CampusTor" (Giessen)

- Architecture and Civil Engineering (Bauwesen)
- Electrical and Information Engineering (Elektro- und Informationstechnik)
- Mechanical and Energy Engineering (Maschinenbau und Energietechnik)
- Life Science Engineering
- Health (Gesundheit)
- Mathematics, Natural sciences and Information Technology (Mathematik, Naturwissenschaften und Informatik)
- THM Business School (Wirtschaft)

=== Giessen and Friedberg ===
- Management and Communication (Management und Kommunikation)

=== Wetzlar ===
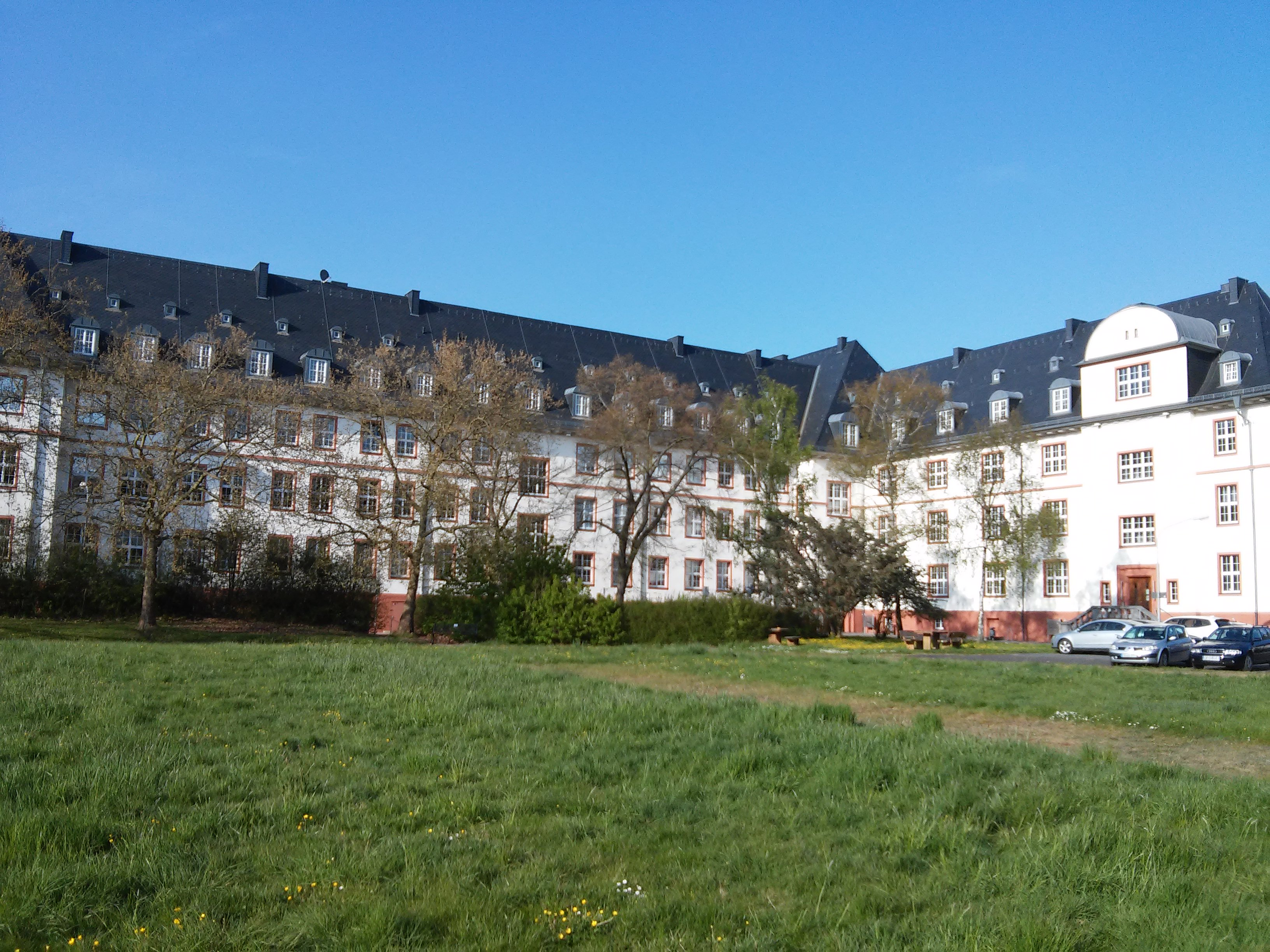
Wetzlar Campus

The StudiumPlus department is a Competence Center of Applied Science and offers a dual system of studying. Students combine learning theory in the university and receive practical approaches in additional business and industries in Business Engineering, Business Administration, Engineering / Micro Systems Technology, Process Management, Controlling of Business Processes and Management Systems
