= Whitcomb Cabin =

Historic house in Washington, United States

- U.S. National Register of Historic Places
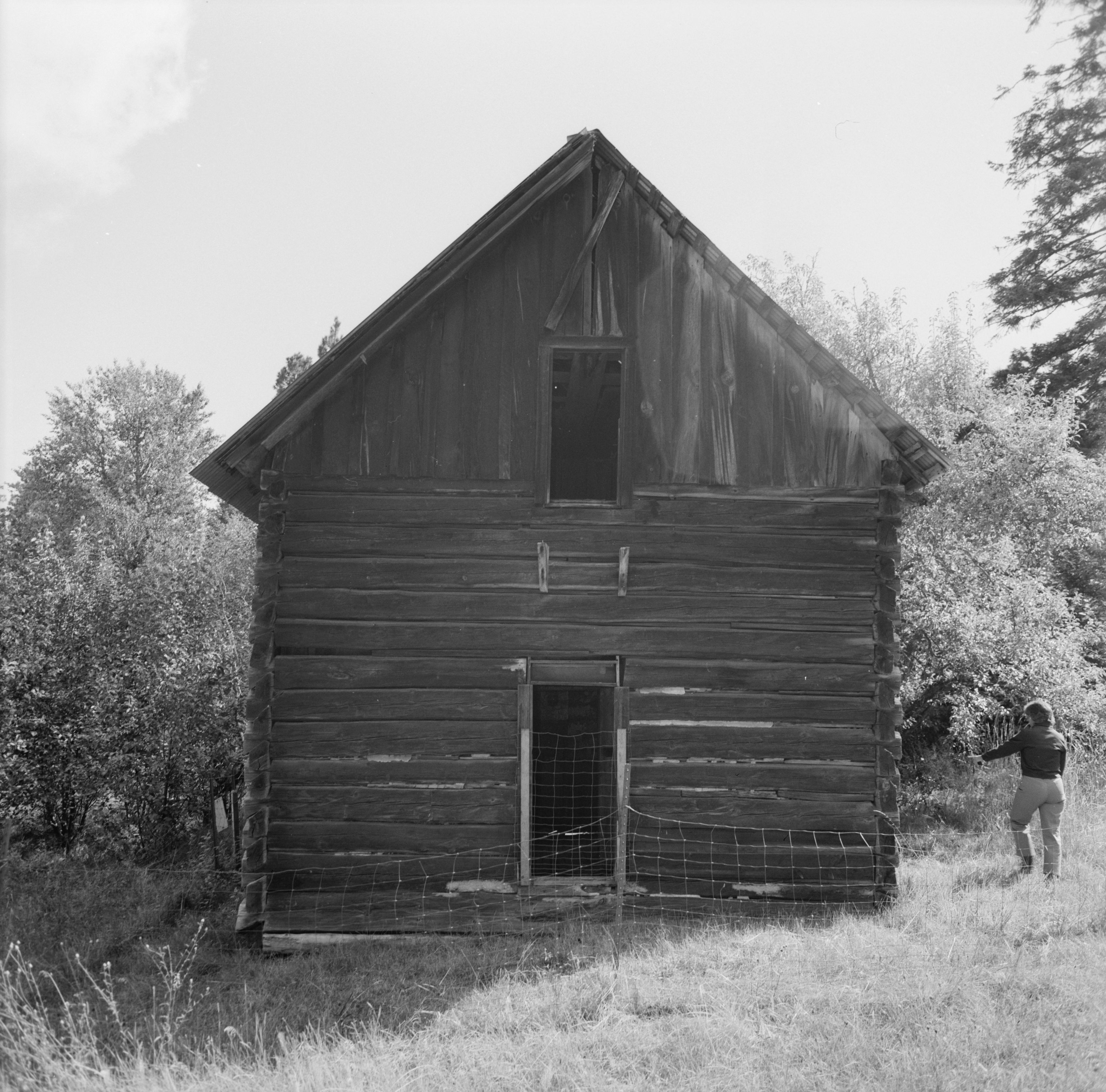

- Location within Washington (state)
- Nearest city: Glenwood, Washington
- Coordinates: 45°57′48″N 121°20′34″W
- Area: 0.5 acres (0.20 ha)
- Built: 1875
- Built by: Whitcomb, Stephen S.; Cole, John N.
- Architectural style: Hewn Log House
- NRHP reference No.: 75001860
- Added to NRHP: June 10, 1975

The Whitcomb Cabin is a historic 18-by-25-foot (5.5 m × 7.6 m) log cabin near Glenwood, Washington that was built in 1875. Known also as the Stephen S. Whitcomb Cabin, it was listed on the National Register of Historic Places in 1975. The listing included one contributing building and two contributing structures.

The cabin is the last surviving pioneer log cabin in the Lake Conboy area and one of few surviving in Klickitat. It is the last building of the former community of Fulda, named for Mr. Whitcomb's home city, Fulda, in Germany. The cabin served as the post office of Fulda.
