= Historic Columbia River Highway =

Highway in Oregon, United States

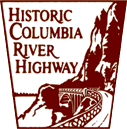
Historic Columbia River Highway No. 100

Route information
- Maintained by ODOT, OPRD, etc.
- Length: 74.1 mi (119.3 km) (measured by historic mileposts)
- History: Constructed 1913–1922; bypassed in 1950s; added to NRHP on December 12, 1983

Major junctions
- West end: Troutdale
- Bridge of the Gods in Cascade Locks; OR 35 near Hood River
- East end: US 30 in The Dalles

Location
- Country: United States
- State: Oregon

Highway system
- Oregon Highways; Interstate; US; State; Named; Scenic
- Columbia River Highway Historic District
- U.S. National Register of Historic Places
- U.S. National Historic Landmark District
- NRHP reference No.: 83004168

Significant dates
- Added to NRHP: December 12, 1983
- Designated NHLD: May 16, 2000

The Historic Columbia River Highway is an approximately 75-mile-long (121 km) scenic highway in the U.S. state of Oregon between Troutdale and The Dalles, built through the Columbia River Gorge between 1913 and 1922. As the first planned scenic roadway in the United States, it has been recognized in numerous ways, including being listed on the National Register of Historic Places, being designated as a National Historic Landmark by the U.S. Secretary of the Interior, being designated as a National Historic Civil Engineering Landmark by the American Society of Civil Engineers, and being considered a "destination unto itself" as an All-American Road by the U.S. Secretary of Transportation. The historic roadway was bypassed by the present Columbia River Highway No. 2 (now Interstate 84 [I-84]) from the 1930s to the 1950s, leaving behind the old two-lane road. The road is now mostly owned and maintained by the state through the Oregon Department of Transportation (ODOT) as the Historic Columbia River Highway No. 100 (still partially marked as U.S. Route 30 (US 30); see Oregon highways and routes) or the Oregon Parks and Recreation Department as the Historic Columbia River Highway State Trail.

The original highway was promoted by lawyer and entrepreneur Sam Hill and engineer Samuel C. Lancaster, to be modeled after the great scenic roads of Europe. From the very beginning, the roadway was envisioned not just as means of traveling by the then popular Model T, but designed with an elegance that took full advantage of all the natural beauty along the route.

When the United States Numbered Highway System was officially established in 1926, the highway became the part of US 30. Since then, modern I-84 has been built parallel to the highway between Portland and The Dalles, replacing it as the main travel route and resulting in the loss of some of the original sections of road.

== History ==
=== Planning and construction ===
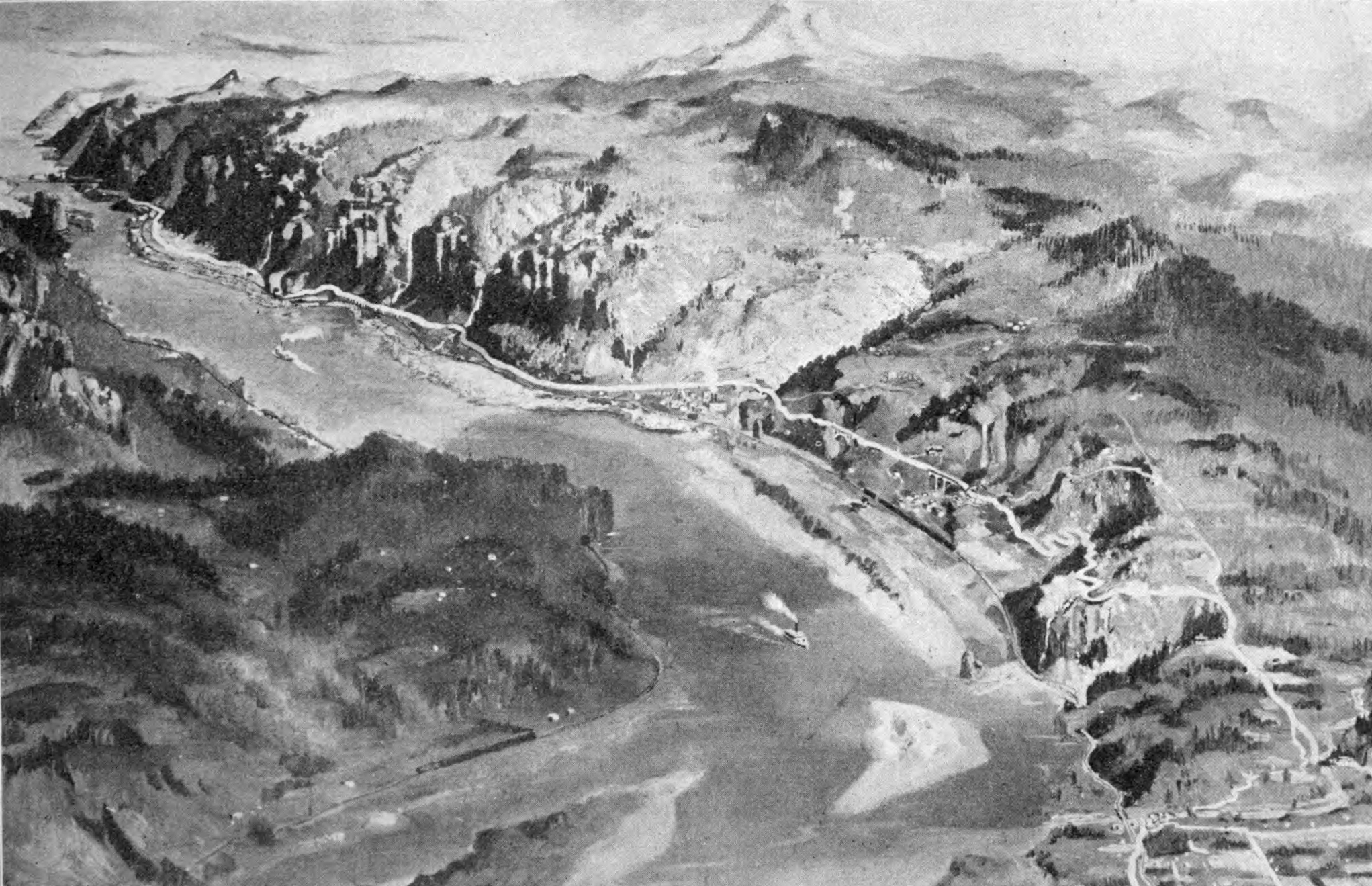
Early map of the Columbia River Highway, from Good Roads magazine, 1916

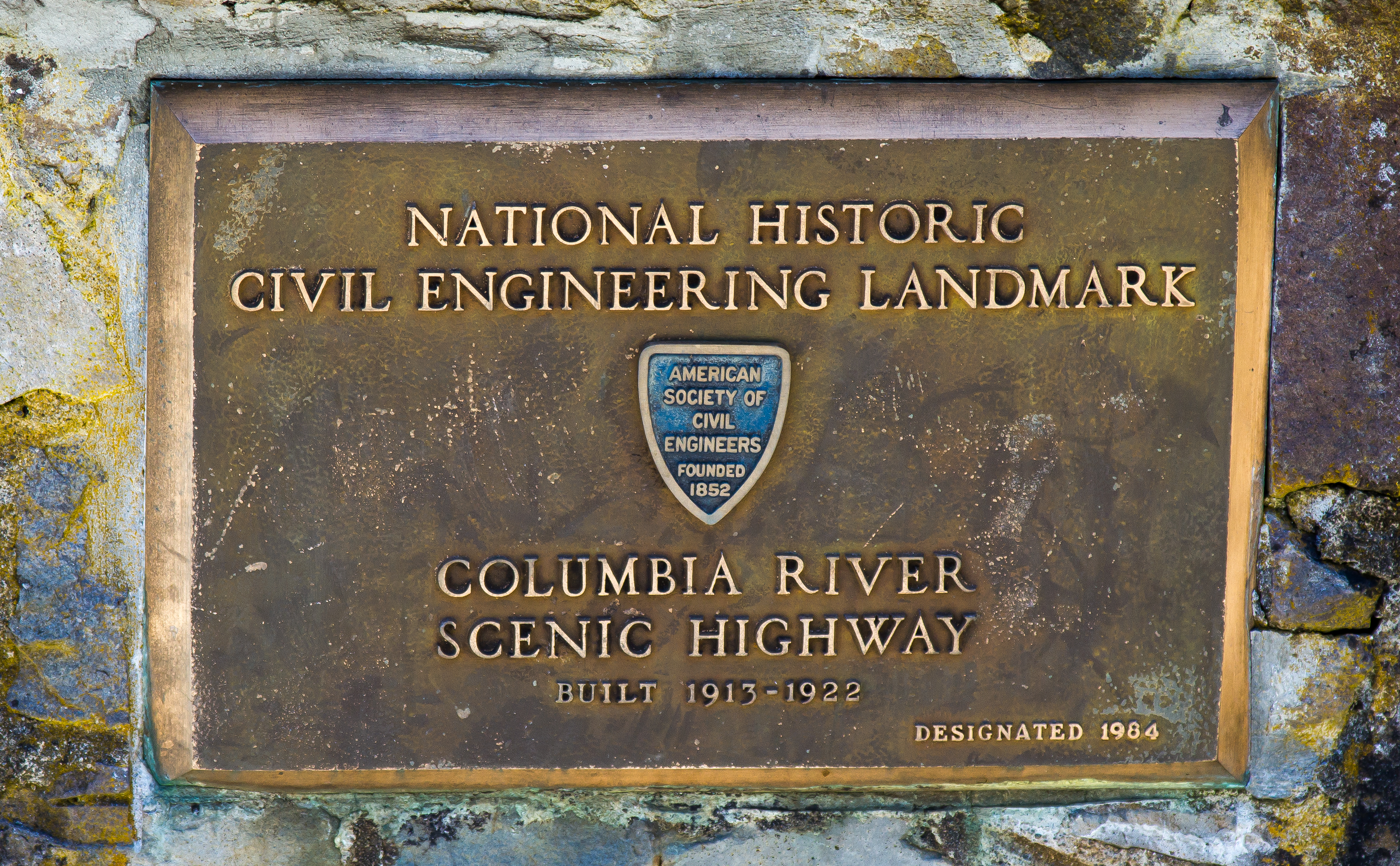
National Historic Civil Engineering Landmark, found near Multnomah Falls on the Columbia River Scenic Highway

The Columbia River Gorge is the lowest crossing of the Cascade Mountains, carved by the Columbia River during the Cascades' uplift. Rafting down the gorge from The Dalles was one of the most expensive and dangerous parts of the Oregon Trail, traveled by thousands of emigrants to the Oregon Territory, until the Barlow Road opened in 1846 around the south side of Mount Hood. A wagon road was finally built through the gorge in the 1870s, when The Dalles and Sandy Wagon Road was constructed along the south shore from The Dalles to the Sandy River east of Portland. However, this road had steep (20%) grades and a crooked and narrow alignment, and it was not until 1882 that the Oregon Railway and Navigation Company finally opened a water-level route, partially destroying the wagon road. With the onset of the automobile and the Good Roads Movement of the early 20th century, a road was once again needed, and Multnomah County began constructing a 20-foot (6 m) roadway with 9% grades, but ran into difficulties relating to the railroad's location. At Shellrock Mountain to the east, long believed to be an impassable barrier, Governor Oswald West used prison labor in 1912 to prove that it was possible to build a road, at least temporarily.

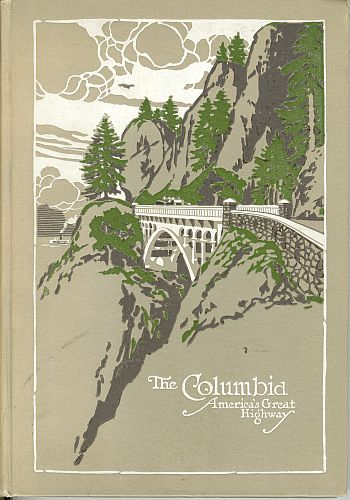
The principal designer, Samuel C. Lancaster, self-published a guide to the highway in 1915.

The eventual highway was primarily designed by engineer and landscape architect Samuel C. Lancaster, a lifelong friend of good roads promoter Samuel Hill. His first contribution to the Pacific Northwest was as a consultant for Seattle's Olmsted boulevard system, part of its preparations for the 1909 Alaska-Yukon-Pacific Exposition. In 1908, the two traveled to Europe for the First International Road Congress, where Hill represented the state of Washington. Hill was especially impressed by Switzerland's Axenstrasse, a road built along Lake Lucerne in 1865 that included a windowed tunnel, and wanted to build a similar scenic highway through the Columbia River Gorge. With Lancaster's help, Hill built the experimental Maryhill Loops Road from the river east of the gorge up the Columbia Hills to his planned Quaker utopian community at Maryhill. The road was the first asphalt road in the state, designed with gradual horseshoe curves to avoid steep grades. However, Washington's lawmakers denied his request for a cross-state trunk route on the river's north bank, and Hill crossed the river to Oregon, the last of the states in the far Western U.S. to create a highway department. With the help of his life-size model at Maryhill, he convinced the state legislature to create the State Highway Commission in 1913, which would work with the counties to build roads. The Multnomah County commissioners agreed later that year that the state should design the route to distance it from county politics, and set aside an initial $75,000.

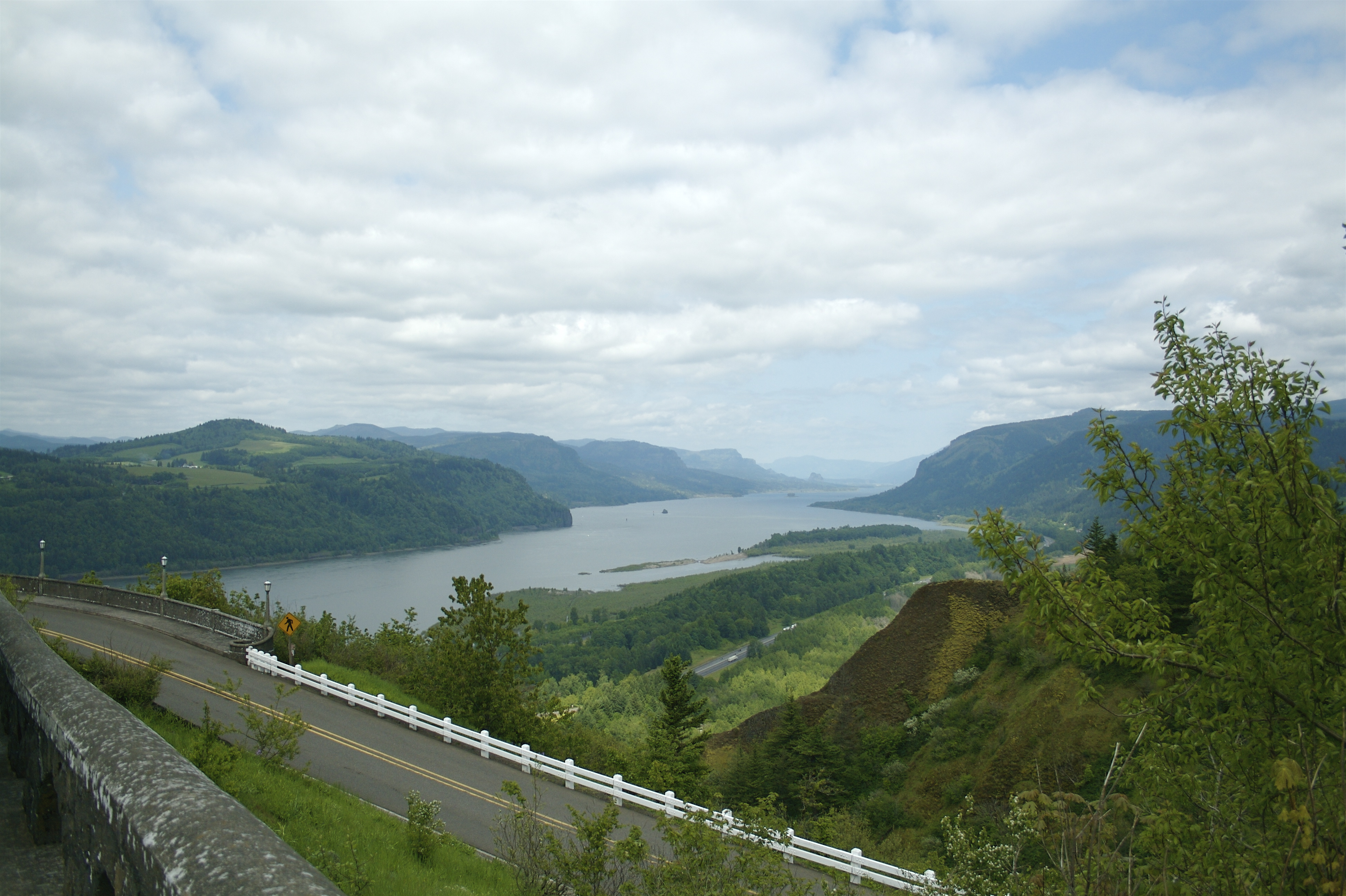
The view from Crown Point

In laying out the highway, Lancaster sought not only to create a transportation artery, but to make the gorge's "beautiful waterfalls, canyons, cliffs and mountain domes" accessible to "men from all climes". According to locating engineer John Arthur Elliott,

The ideals sought were not the usual economic features and considerations given the location of a trunk highway. Grades, curvature, distance and even expense were sacrificed to reach some scenic vista or to develop a particularly interesting point. All the natural beauty spots were fixed as control points and the location adjusted to include them. Although the highway would have a commercial value in connecting the Coast country with the eastern areas, no consideration was given the commercial over scenic requirements. The one prevailing idea in the location and construction was to make this highway a great scenic boulevard surpassing all other highways of the world.

Lancaster began surveying near the Chanticleer Inn, where Larch Mountain Road, part of Multnomah County's existing road network, began climbing the hills of the gorge. For five months, from September 1913 to January 1914, he laid out a route for about 21 miles (34 km) to the Hood River County line west of Cascade Locks. The alignment generally had a maximum grade of 5% and curve radius of 200 feet (61 m), and was wide enough for 18 feet (5.5 m) of macadam (later asphalt) and two 3-foot (0.91 m) gravel shoulders. To accomplish this, Lancaster used curves similar to the road he had designed at Maryhill where the highway descended from Crown Point.

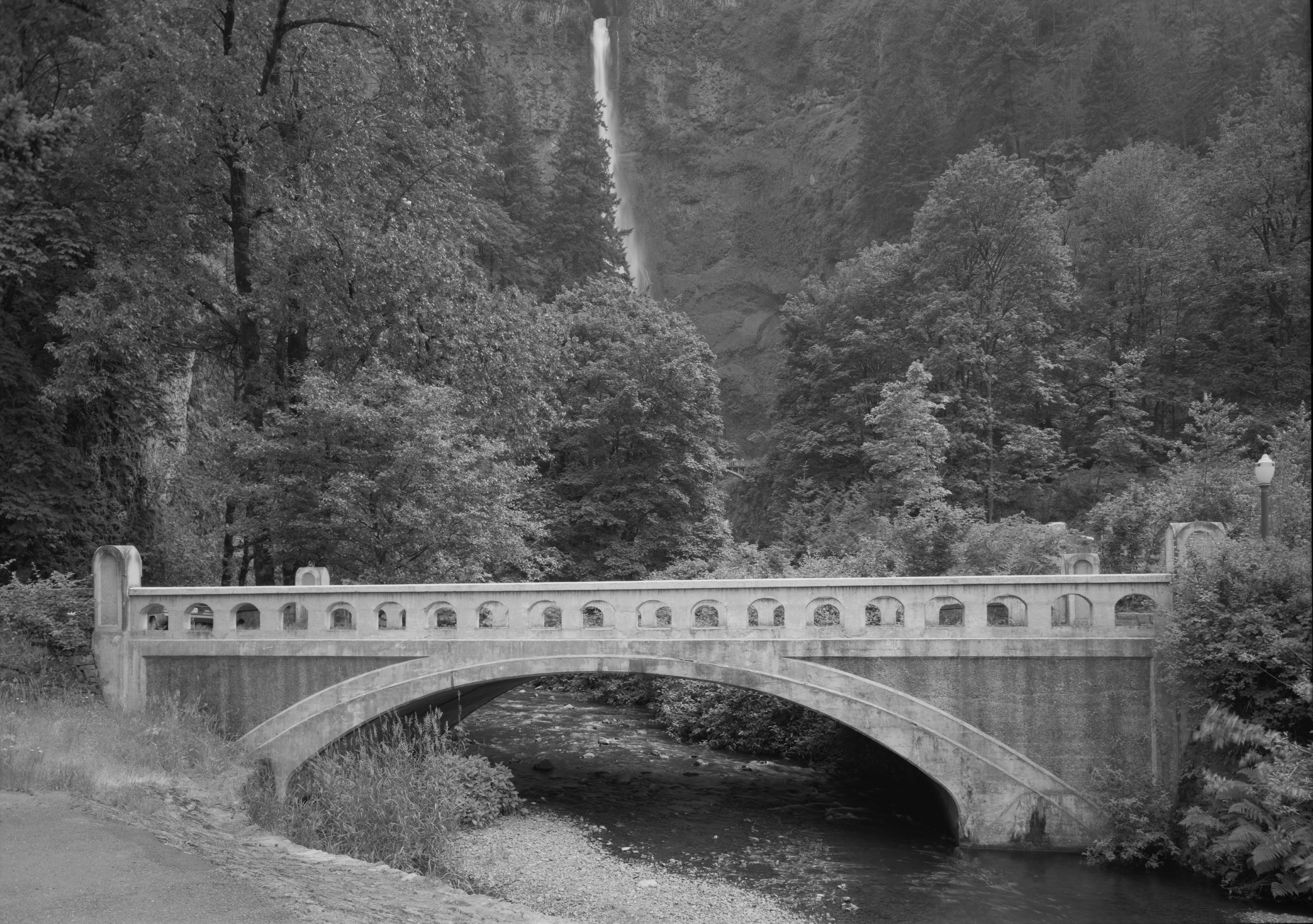
The Multnomah Creek Bridge

To carry rainwater off the road, Lancaster designed a comprehensive drainage system, including raising the center of the road, installing concrete curbs and gutters as on a city street, and taking the road over heavy flows on culverts. Eleven larger reinforced concrete bridges and several full or half viaducts were specially designed for the Multnomah County portion of the highway, taking the road over streams or along steep hillsides with a minimum of earthmoving. Masonry was used for retaining walls, which kept the highway from falling off the hillside, and guard walls, which kept drivers and pedestrians from falling off the road. At Oneonta Bluff, the highway passed through the first of five tunnels, as the land to the north was taken by the rail line. With the completion of the Oneonta Tunnel and a number of bridges, the road was open to traffic west of Warrendale, near Horsetail Falls, by October 1914. In April 1915, Multnomah County voters approved the cost of covering the initial macadam with a patented long-lasting bituminous mixture known as Warrenite, which was completed to the county line by the end of the summer.

For the section west of the Chanticleer Inn, Multnomah County generally made improvements to existing roads. Base Line Road (Stark Street) stretched east from Portland almost to the Sandy River; the roadway east of Troutdale Road to the river, including the present Sweetbriar Road, was somewhat circuitous. An old wooden Pratt through truss bridge over the Sandy collapsed on April 25, 1914, and its steel replacement was built as part of the Columbia River Highway project. A new extension of Base Line Road, built in 1915, gradually descended the riverbank to the bridge. Between the river and the inn, existing roads were incorporated into the highway, which bypassed other sections such as Nielson Road and Bell Road. The county built a second approach to the highway in 1916, using the existing Sandy Boulevard to Troutdale and a 1912 through truss bridge that connected to Woodard Road. A new roadway bypassed Woodard Road's steep grades, following the riverbank to the east end of the 1914 bridge. The entire length of the highway in Multnomah County was maintained by the county until January 16, 1930, when the state took over maintenance of the Sandy Boulevard route. (Stark Street was never a state-maintained highway, though for a time it was signed as U.S. Route 30 Alternate.)

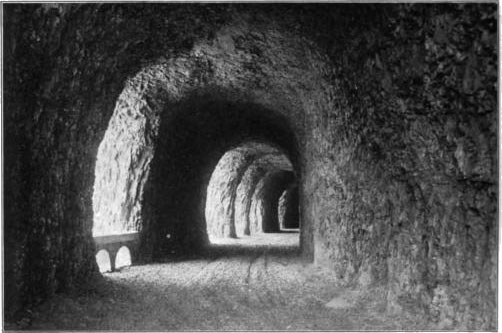
The Mitchell Point Tunnel

Beyond Multnomah County, State Highway Department engineer John Arthur Elliott surveyed a route along the river through Hood River County in 1913 and 1914, mostly using the 1870s wagon road where available. County voters approved a bond issue in mid-1914 to pay for construction west of the city of Hood River, helped by highway promoter Simon Benson's purchase of the entire issue and promise to pay any overruns. The most difficult location was at Mitchell Point, where the old road included grades of up to 23% to take it over a saddle, and the railroad occupied the only available land between the cliff and the river. Elliott solved the problem by building the Mitchell Point Tunnel—a windowed tunnel like on Switzerland's Axenstrasse—through the cliff, with a viaduct on the west approach. Construction began in March 1915, and the Mitchell Point section was opened to traffic in early September, at a cost of about $47,000. To dedicate the completed highway between Portland and Hood River, two ceremonies were held at Multnomah Falls and Crown Point on the same day in June 1916.

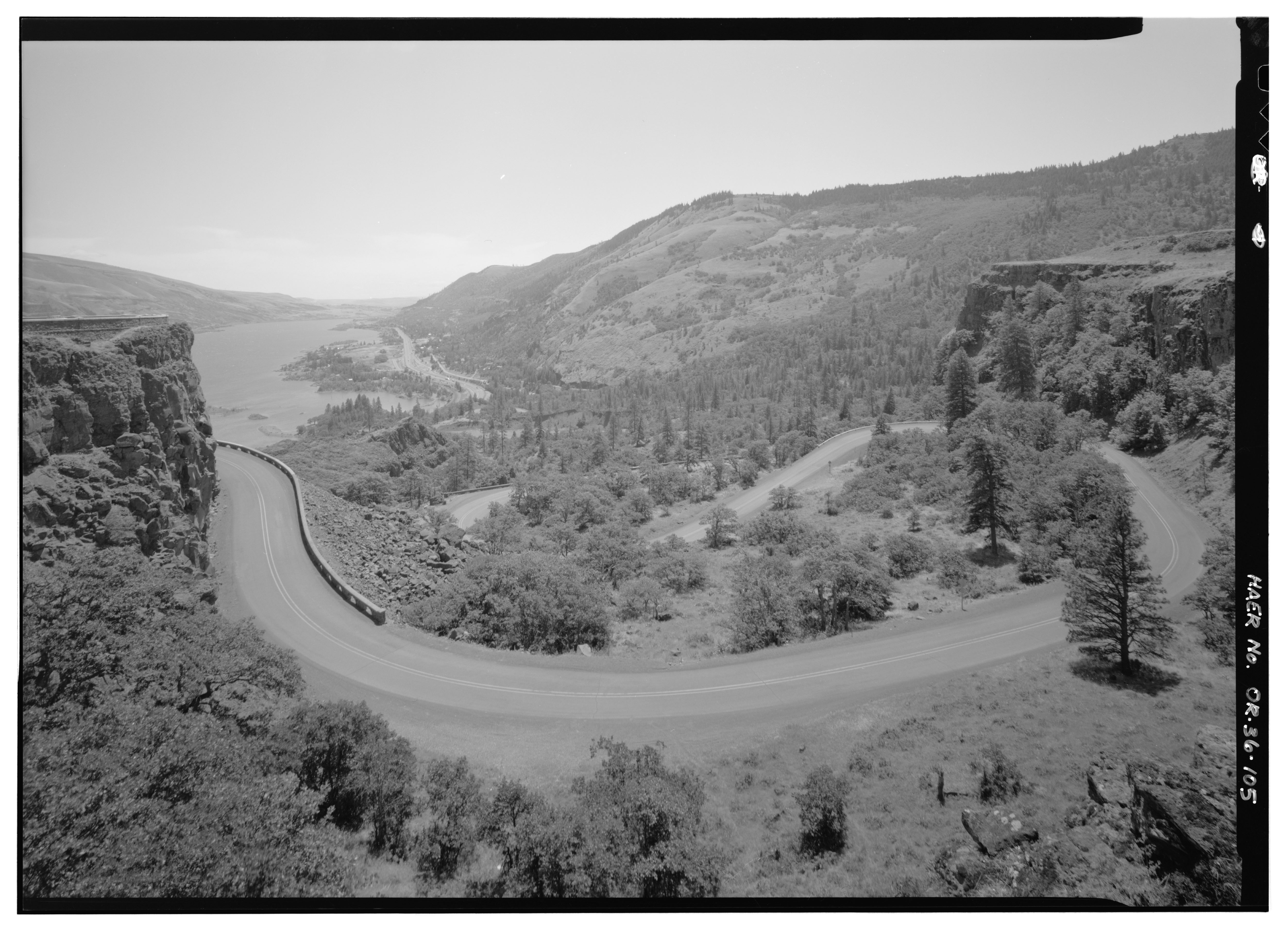
The Rowena Loops

Between Hood River and The Dalles, construction was delayed by rugged terrain west of and debate over the best route east of Mosier. Elliott considered several options west of Mosier, including a route close to the railroad, which had again taken the best location along the river, and a route over the Mosier Hills, closer to the existing county road (now Old Dalles Drive and Hood River Road). The former, while shorter, would be, in Elliott's words, "passing a section made up of views which would leave a lasting impression on the traveler". Elliott had left the State Highway Department by 1917, when new locating engineer Roy A. Klein surveyed a third alignment. It was closer to the river than the old county road, yet higher than Elliott's river alignment, in order to avoid closing the rail line during blasting. Just after leaving Hood River on a 1918 bridge over the Hood River, which had replaced an older wooden truss bridge, the highway climbed via a series of loops, similar to the ones at Crown Point. From there it followed the course of the river, partway up the hillside. Near the east end, the Mosier Twin Tunnels, completed in 1920, carried the road through a portion of the hill; the eastern of the two included two windows, similar to the five at Mitchell Point. Because of its beauty, photographers like William Henry Jackson, Benjamin A. Gifford, Arthur Prentiss and Carleton Watkins documented the construction of this highway.

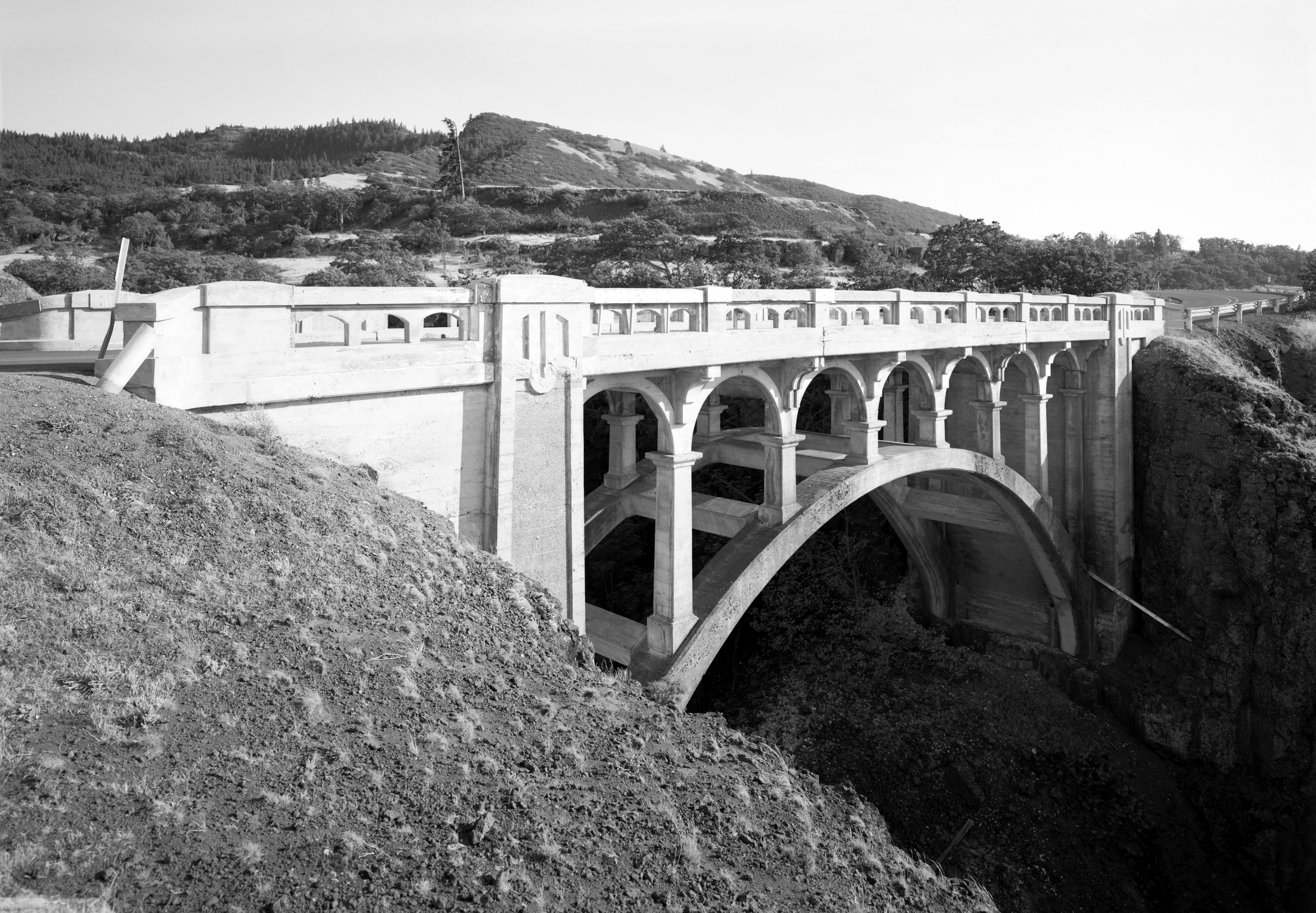
The Dry Canyon Creek Bridge, designed by Conde McCullough

The final piece to The Dalles was laid out by J. H. Scott of the State Highway Department. It followed an inland route, climbing existing county roads to the Rowena Crest, where it used a third set of loops to descend to river level at Rowena. There it picked up a former alignment of the Oregon-Washington Railroad and Navigation Company most of the way to The Dalles. Most of the bridges in Wasco County were designed by Conde McCullough, who would later become famous for his work on U.S. Route 101, the Oregon Coast Highway. A completion ceremony for the Columbia River Highway was held on June 27, 1922, when Simon Benson symbolically helped pave the final portion near Rowena. By then, the roadway was part of a longer Columbia River Highway, stretching from Astoria on the Pacific Ocean east to Pendleton as Highway No. 2 in a large network of state highways. In the State Highway Department's fifth biennial report, published in 1922, it reported that construction costs to date on the Columbia River Highway totaled about $11 million, with the state contributing $7.6 million, the federal government $1.1 million, and the counties $2.3 million ($1.5 million of which was from Multnomah County). In 1926, the American Association of State Highway Officials designated the road as part of U.S. Route 30. The first realignment was made by 1935 at the west entrance to The Dalles, where a more direct route along West 2nd Street bypassed the old alignment along West 6th Street, the Mill Creek Bridge, and West 3rd Place.

=== Water-level bypass ===
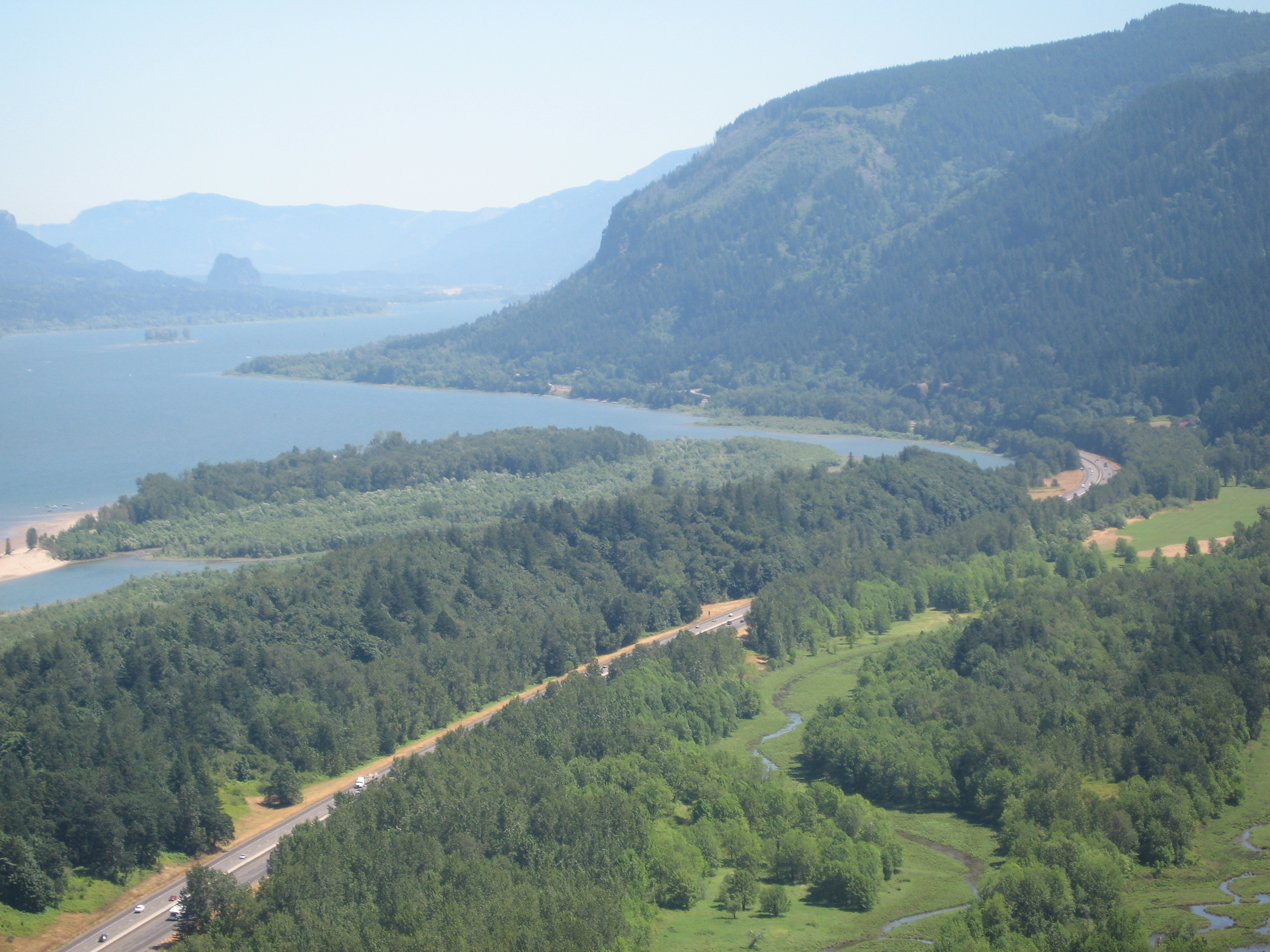
The new water-level route as seen from Crown Point, looking east

Even as construction was ongoing on the east end of the Columbia River Highway, the design had become obsolete, as motorists wanting to get to their destination greatly outnumbered tourists taking a pleasure drive. There were also problems with rockfall, especially west of the Mosier Twin Tunnels. By 1932, Lancaster proposed a new water-level route, while keeping the old road as a scenic highway. The first such bypass was necessitated by the federal government's creation of Bonneville Dam on the Columbia River. The dam would flood the railroad, and the highway would need to be moved so the railroad could take its place. The highway's new two-lane alignment, completed in 1937, crossed the old road several times between the community of Bonneville (just east of Tanner Creek) and Cascade Locks. The realignment had the effect of closing the old road to all but the most local of traffic, since the construction of the east portal of the new Toothrock Tunnel, just west of a new bridge over Eagle Creek, had destroyed a section of road on the hillside.

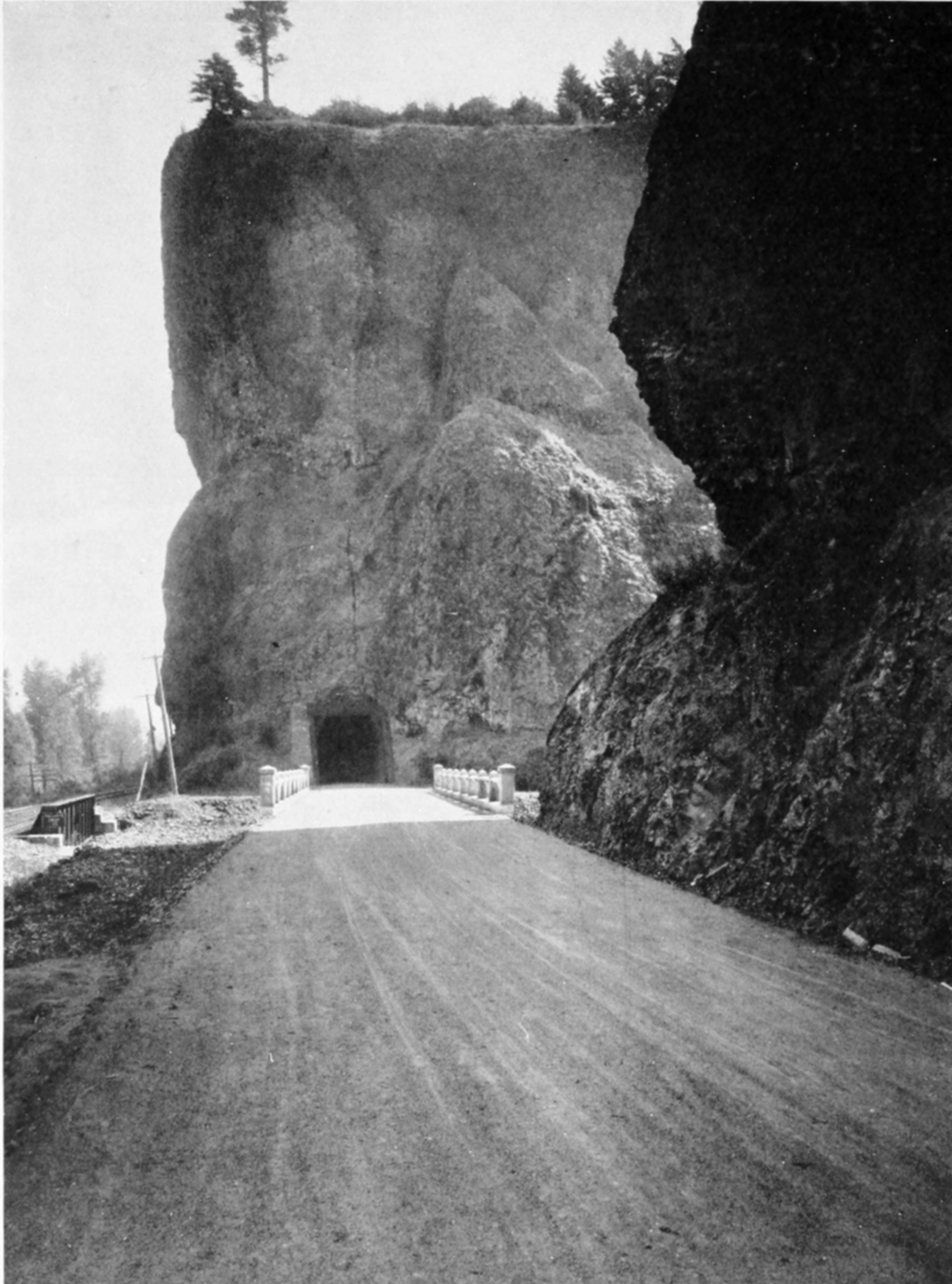
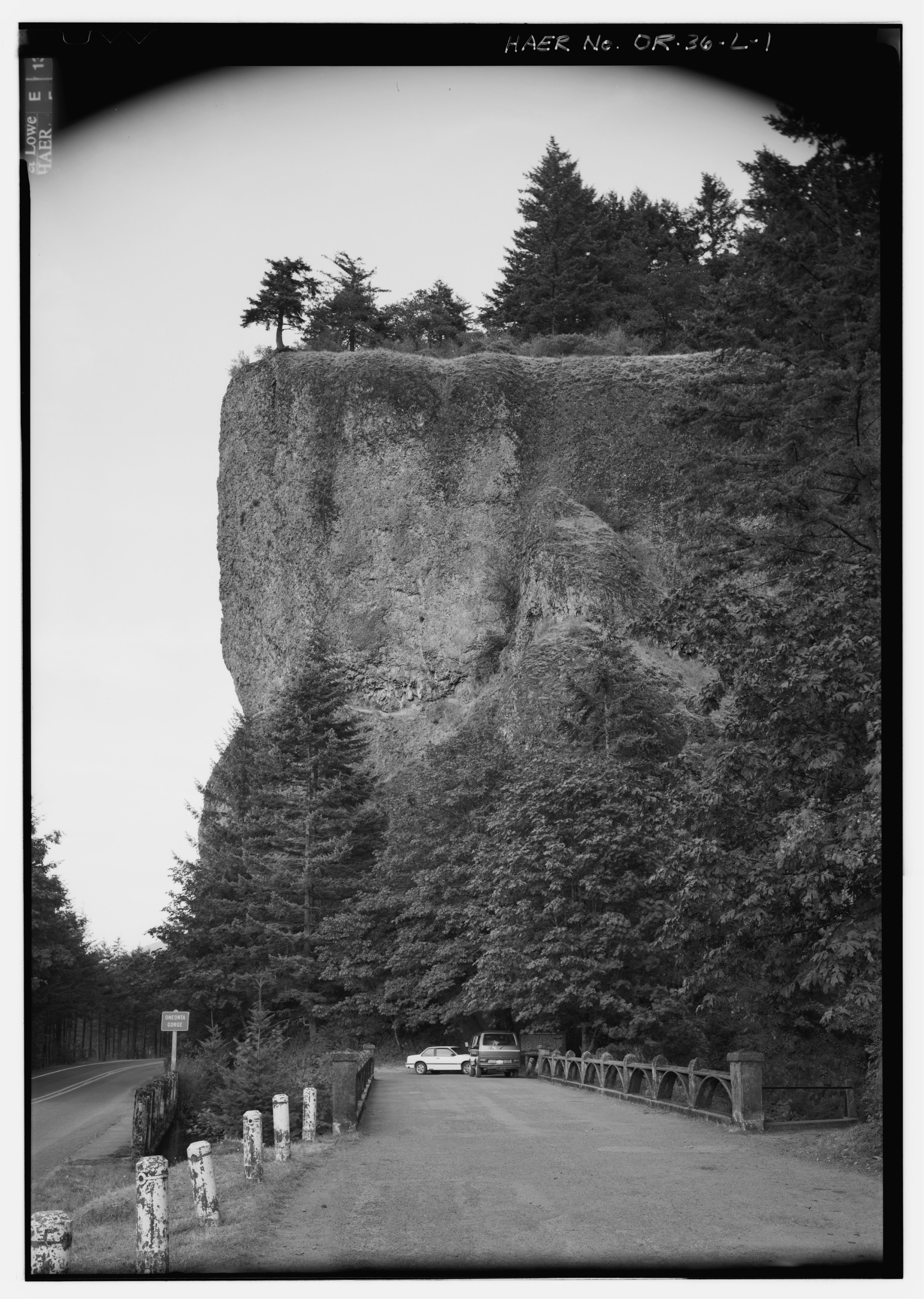
The Oneonta Tunnel, with the railroad to the north (left image) and after bypassing (right image), the railroad now out of view beyond the trees

By the end of the 1940s, the original cross section of 18 feet (5.5 m) of pavement and two 3-foot (0.91 m) shoulders had been modified to 24 feet (7.3 m) of pavement. The Mosier Twin Tunnels were similarly widened from 8 2/3 to 10 feet (2.6 to 3.0 m) in each direction in 1938 to accommodate larger trucks, but this was not enough, and traffic signals were later installed at the tunnels to regulate one-way traffic. A 1948 bypass of the Oneonta Tunnel was made possible by moving the railroad slightly north on fill; the railroad benefited by removing the risk of the thin tunnel wall collapsing onto the track. Oneonta Tunnel was sealed in 1948 but revealed again fifty-five years later as part of the Historic Columbia River Highway restoration project.

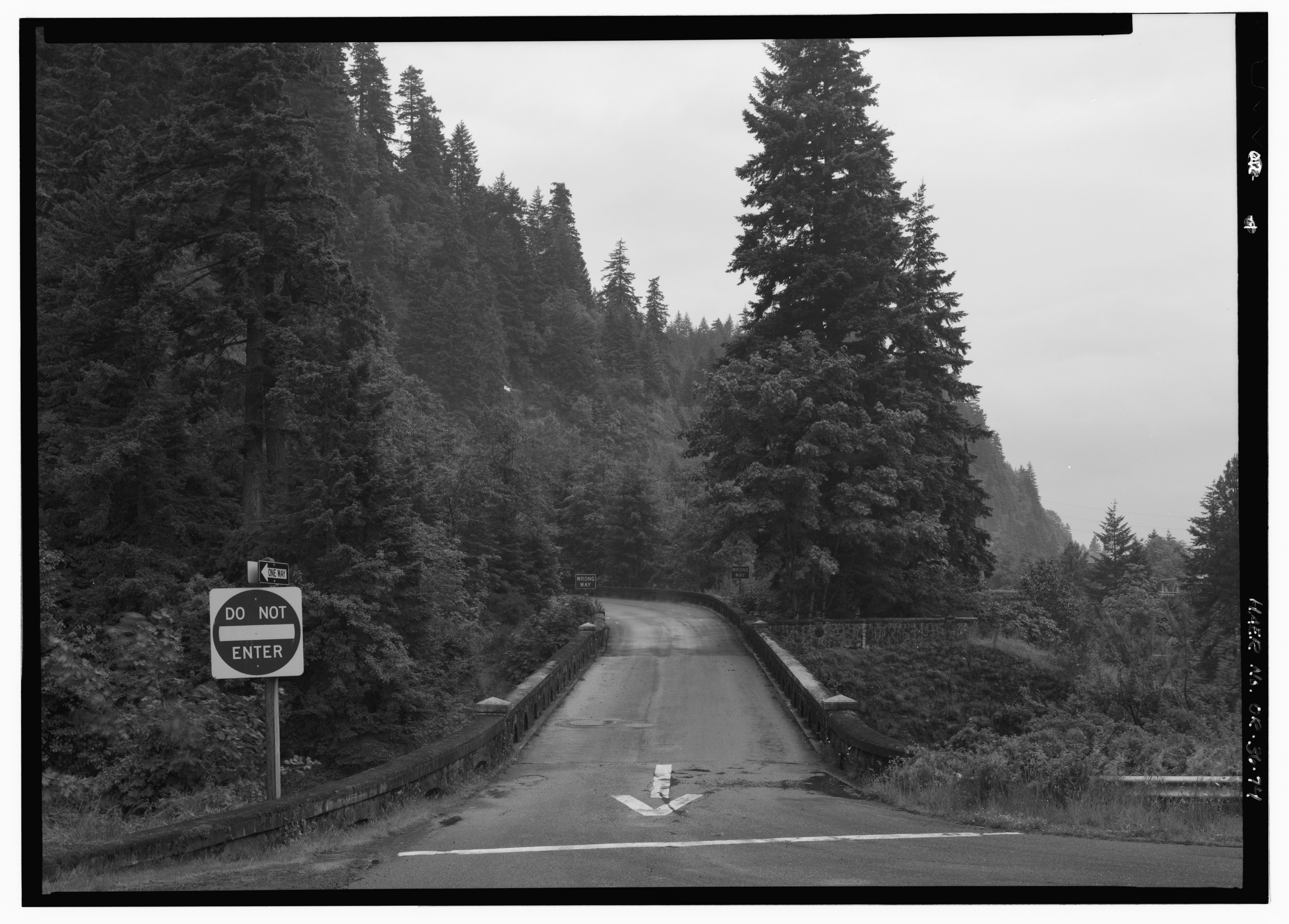
Eagle Creek Bridge

More comprehensive bypass planning began by 1941, when the State Highway Commission adopted surveys for the new highway.

=== Restoration and current use ===
Starting in June 2006, the Oregon Department of Transportation, using about $1.5 million in state and federal money, began restoring the Oneonta Tunnel to its 1920s appearance. The tunnel officially reopened March 21, 2009 for pedestrian and bicycle traffic.

The Eagle Creek Fire swept through the Gorge in September 2017, causing rockslides that closed the historic highway for a year. The highway remained closed between Bridal Veil and Ainsworth State Park until November 23, 2018 for restoration and reconstruction work.

== Route description and historic designations ==
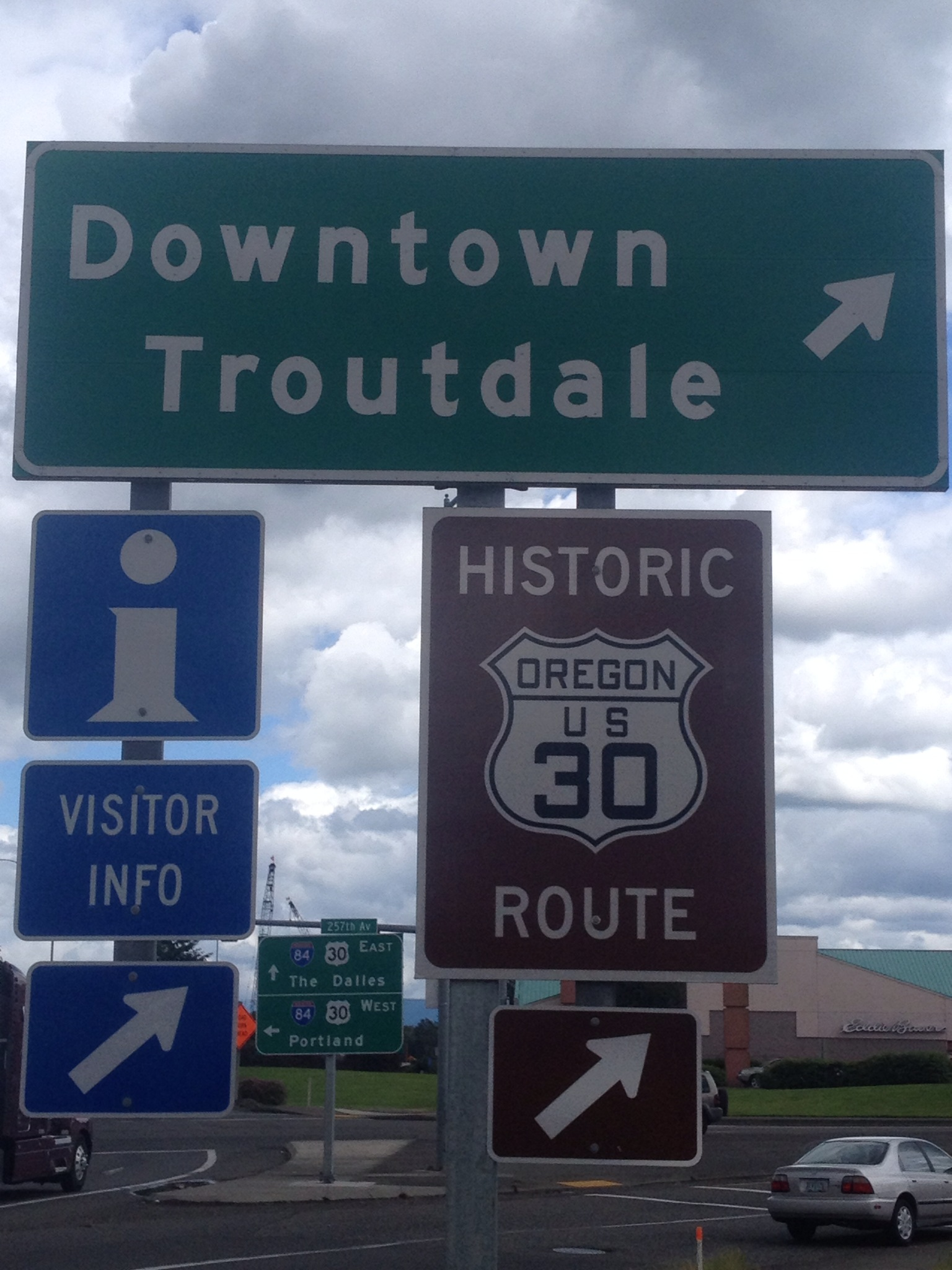
Historic Route 30 Sign

Although the city of Troutdale has named the old highway "Columbia River Highway" west to 244th Avenue, where it is cut by I-84, signs for the scenic byway begin at exit 17 of I-84, and point south on Graham Road to the west end of downtown Troutdale. Modern milepoint zero of the Historic Columbia River Highway No. 100 is located at the west end of the Sandy River bridge, historic milepost 14.2.

Modern highways, including I-84, and other developments have resulted in the abandonment of major sections of the historic original highway. In the interest of tourism and historical preservation, 74 miles (119 km) of the original road—from Troutdale to The Dalles—have been established as the Historic Columbia River Highway (HCRH). Forty miles (64 km) of the route are open to motor vehicles:

- The 24 westernmost miles (39 km) miles starting in Troutdale (at the eastern edge of urban Portland) provide access to dozens of hiking trails, Crown Point Vista House, and numerous waterfalls such as Multnomah Falls. This section forms a loop with the Mount Hood Scenic Byway.
- The 16 easternmost miles (26 km) ending in The Dalles.

The remaining portions of the HCRH designated for non-motorized use are now known as the Historic Columbia River Highway State Trail. These are being developed as money becomes available. Roughly seven miles (11 km) between Hood River and Mosier have been open to non-motorized traffic since 2000, passing through the historic Mosier Tunnels.

Once restoration is complete, the highway will serve as a scenic and alternative bicycle route for I-84 and US 30 between The Dalles and Portland. Currently, cyclists wishing to travel between these two towns must ride on the shoulders of I-84 for much of the distance, or the much more dangerous and narrow State Route 14 on the Washington side of the river.

The Columbia River Highway is the nation's oldest scenic highway. In 1984 it was recognized as a National Historic Civil Engineering Landmark by the American Society of Civil Engineers. In 2000 it was designated a National Historic Landmark by the National Park Service as "an outstanding example of modern highway development".

The Columbia River Highway Historic District was listed on the National Register of Historic Places in 1983. It includes 38 contributing structures on 529 acres (2.14 km^{2}).

== See also ==
- Columbia River Gorge
- List of National Historic Landmarks in Oregon
- List of Registered Historic Places in Oregon
