= Sam Hill Memorial =

Sam Hill Memorial may refer to:

- Sam Hill Memorial Bridge, carrying US 97 over the Columbia River between Oregon and Washington, U.S.
- Sam Hill Memorial Rock, at Chanticleer Point, Oregon, U.S.
- Samuel Hill Memorial Park, now Peace Arch State Park in Washington, U.S.
