= Arthur Prentiss =

American photographer (1865–1940)

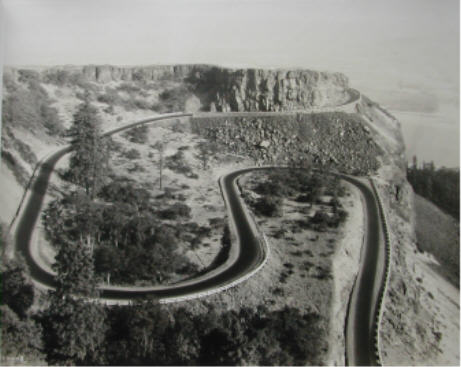
Rowena Loops from the Columbia River Highway, by Arthur Prentiss. 1917.

Arthur M. Prentiss (1865 – c. 1941) was an American photographer. Some of his photos are part of the Farm Security Administration - Office of War Information Collection held in the Library Of Congress and most of his work was developed in Oregon.

== Photography ==
Prentiss worked in the principal photography studios of Oregon between 1913-1922. In 1913, Prentiss joined the Weister Company. In 1917, he joined Benjamin A. Gifford, the most famous photographer of Oregon at that time, creating Gifford-Prentiss Inc. The Gifford & Prentiss Studio was located on SW Washington between Twelfth and Thirteenth Street in Portland and lasted until Gifford retired in 1920. Note that Benjamin Gifford bought Kiser Photo Co. photographs and many of them are housed in the Gifford and Prentiss photograph collection.

In 1922 Prentiss acquired Weister's studio and negatives. Arthur M. Prentiss principal studio, as a single professional photographer, was in 45 Fourth Street in Portland Oregon

He produced views of the Construction of Highways in Oregon: Columbia River Highway (Rowena Loops, Twin tunnels, ...) and John Day Highway (Pipe organ rocks, ...). Prentiss also documented life and works of people of Oregon.

== Collections ==
- The following collections, in the University of Oregon, hold Prentiss' photographs:
  - Brice P. Disque photographs - It documents the work of the Spruce Production Division of the Bureau of Aircraft Division, commanded by Colonel Brice P. Disque (monumental Northwest spruce production program to supply lumber for military aircraft, 1917-1919).
  - Angelus Studio Photographs - It consists in the documentation of the city of Portland, Oregon landmarks, and commercial operations. The photographs of this studio were taken by George Weister and Arthur Prentiss.
  - Gifford Photographs Collection - Photographs of Oregon, and views of the Columbia River, Columbia River Gorge, and Columbia River Highway. Other subjects include are agriculture, fishing and fisheries and transportation
- University of Washington Libraries
- Farm Security Administration

== Exhibitions ==
- Wild Beauty - Photographs of the Columbia River Gorge, 1867-1957. From October 4, 2008 to January 11, 2009. Portland Art Museum. Includes photos by Carleton E. Watkins, Arthur M. Prentiss, Fred Kiser, Lily E. White, William Henry Jackson and others. PDF

== Sources ==
- Outings in the Pacific Northwest. Published by James, Kerns & Abbot Co. in 1921. Published to promote travel on the Union Pacific Railroad. Included some of Prentiss' photographs.
- Spruce helped win the war: a portrayal of the personnel, railroad construction, timber cutting and shipping, camp life and kindred subjects necessary to the production of airplane spruce in unlimited quantities for the United States and her allies. Published by A.M Prentiss in 1918. 32 p. Prentiss at the time was official photographer for Warren Spruce Company and Grant Smith-Porter Brothers.
- The Columbia River highway. Published by J.K. Gill Company in Portland, sometime between 1900-1910. A book of photographs by A.M Prentiss.
