= Rowena, Oregon =

Unincorporated community in the state of Oregon, United States

- Census-designated place (CDP)
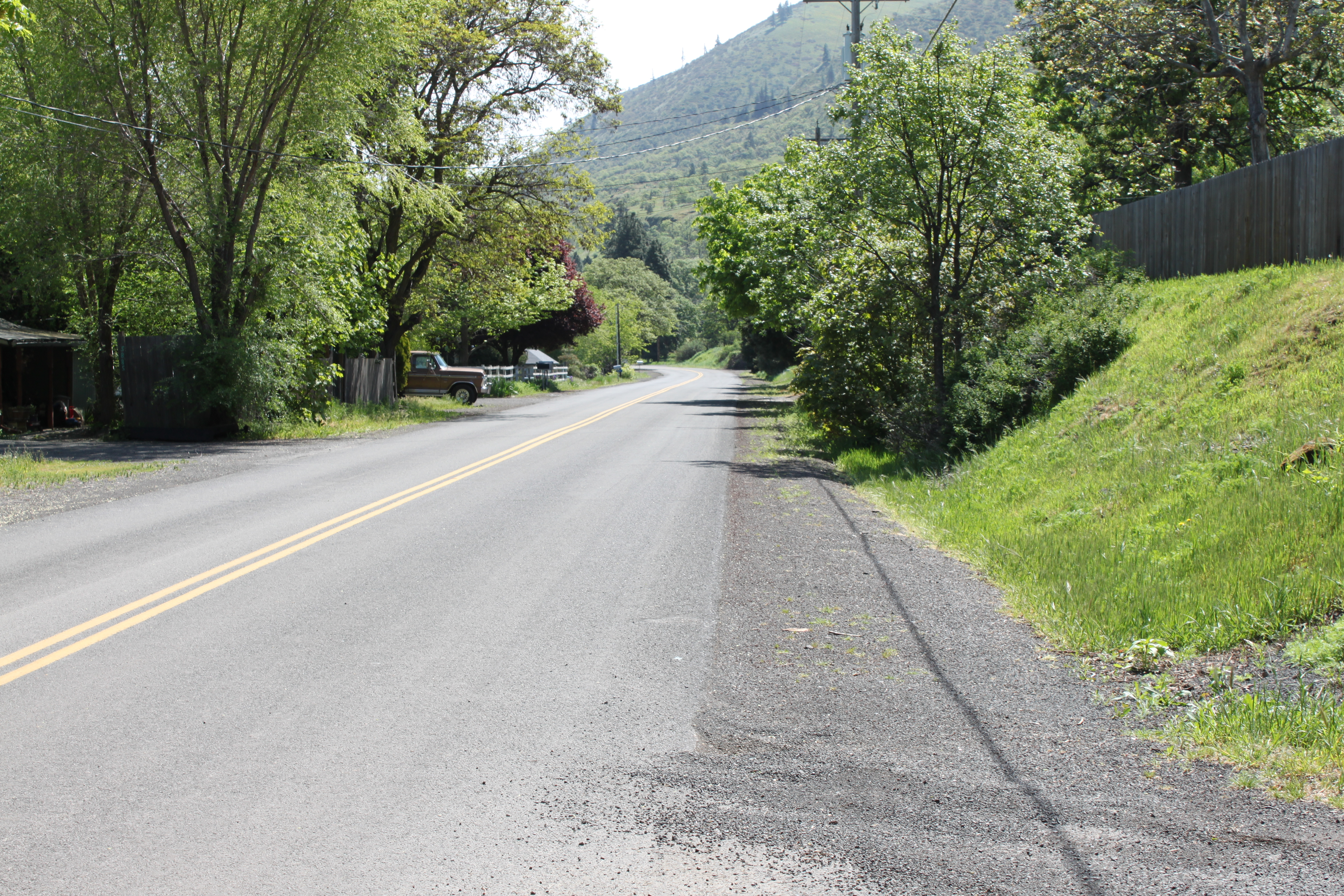
- Modern Rowena, Oregon along U.S. Route 30

- Location of Rowena, Oregon
- Coordinates: 45°40′12″N 121°16′30″W
- Country: United States
- State: Oregon
- County: Wasco

Area
  - Total: 1.81 sq mi (4.68 km^{2})
  - Land: 1.81 sq mi (4.68 km^{2})
  - Water: 0 sq mi (0.00 km^{2})
- Elevation: 801 ft (244 m)

Population (2020)
  - Total: 192
  - Density: 106.2/sq mi (41.02/km^{2})
- Time zone: UTC-8 (Pacific (PST))
  - Summer (DST): UTC-7 (PDT)
- ZIP code: 97058
- Area codes: 458 and 541
- FIPS code: 41-63950
- GNIS feature ID: 2409219

Rowena is an unincorporated community in Wasco County, Oregon, United States. For statistical purposes, the United States Census Bureau has defined Rowena as a census-designated place (CDP). The census definition of the area may not precisely correspond to local understanding of the area with the same name. As of the 2020 census, Rowena had a population of 192.

Rowena is located west of The Dalles on the Columbia River, where the river passes through the natural feature Rowena Gap. Interstate 84 (Columbia River Highway) and U.S. Route 30 (Historic Columbia River Highway) pass through the community. Route 30 near Rowena is notable for the Rowena Loops.

The origin of the name "Rowena" is disputed. Two sources say Rowena was named for H.S. Rowe, a railroad company official, in the early 1880s. Another source says it was named for a girl, Rowena, who had been living in the area at the time the community was founded. It is also possible that the name comes indirectly from Rowena, Ivanhoe's lover in the novel of the same name by Sir Walter Scott.

There was once a ferry operating between Rowena and Lyle, Washington, across the Columbia.

The Nature Conservancy has a nature reserve on the plateau near Rowena, the Tom McCall Preserve, known for its spring wildflowers. The preserve is owned and managed in co-operation with Mayer State Park.

In June 2025, the Rowena Fire destroyed more than 50 residences in the Rowena area.

== Geography ==
According to the United States Census Bureau, the CDP has a total area of 1.9 square miles (4.9 km^{2}), all land.

== Demographics ==
Historical population
Census	Pop.	Note	%±
2020	192		—
U.S. Decennial Census

At the 2010 census, there were 187 people, 77 households and 51 families residing in the CDP. The population density was 98.4 per square mile (38.0/km^{2}). There were 111 housing units at an average density of 58.4 per square mile (22.5/km^{2}). The racial make-up of the CDP was 97.9% White, 0.5% Asian, 0.5% Pacific Islander, 0.5% some other race and 0.5% two or more races.

There were 77 households, of which 31.2% had children under the age of 18 living with them, 48.1% were married couples living together and 33.8% were non-families. 27.3% of all households were made up of individuals and 22.1% had someone living alone who was 65 years of age or older. The average household size was 2.43 and the average family size was 2.86. The median age was 41.2 years. Females made up 48.1% of the population and males 51.9%.
