= Crown Point (Oregon) =

Basalt promontory in Oregon, USA

Crown Point State Scenic Corridor
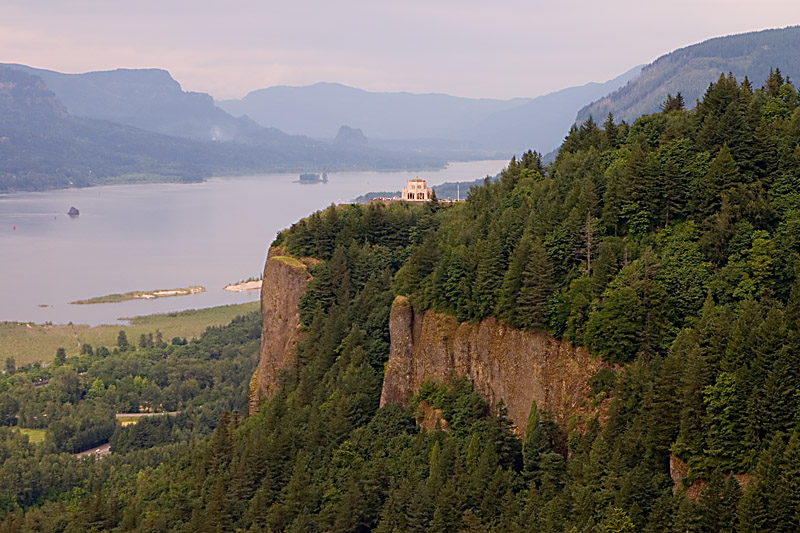
- Crown Point in the Columbia River Gorge, Oregon, taken from Chanticleer Point

- Location within Oregon
- Location: Multnomah County, Oregon
- Nearest city: Portland
- Coordinates: 45°32′22″N 122°14′39″W
- Area: 306 acres (124 ha)
- Established: 1938
- Website: www.oregonstateparks.org/index.cfm?do=parkPage.dsp_parkPage&parkId=108

U.S. National Natural Landmark
- Designated: 1971

Crown Point (also known historically as Thor's Heights or Thor's Crown) is a basalt promontory on the Columbia River Gorge and an associated state park in the U.S. state of Oregon. It is located in eastern Multnomah County, approximately 15 miles (24 km) east of Portland. Crown Point is one of the scenic lookouts along the Historic Columbia River Highway, providing a panoramic view of part of the Columbia River. It stands 733 feet (223 m) above the river and is the remains of a lava flow that filled the ancestral channel of the Columbia River 14 to 17 million years ago. The Point was designated a National Natural Landmark in 1971.

== Vista House ==
The 1918 Art Nouveau style Vista House is an observatory at Crown Point that also serves as a memorial to Oregon pioneers and as a comfort station for travelers on the Historic Columbia River Highway. The site, on a rocky promontory, is 733 feet (223 m) above the Columbia River on the south side of the Columbia River Gorge. The building shows great sensitivity to its site in the Columbia River Gorge near Corbett, and is listed on the National Register of Historic Places.

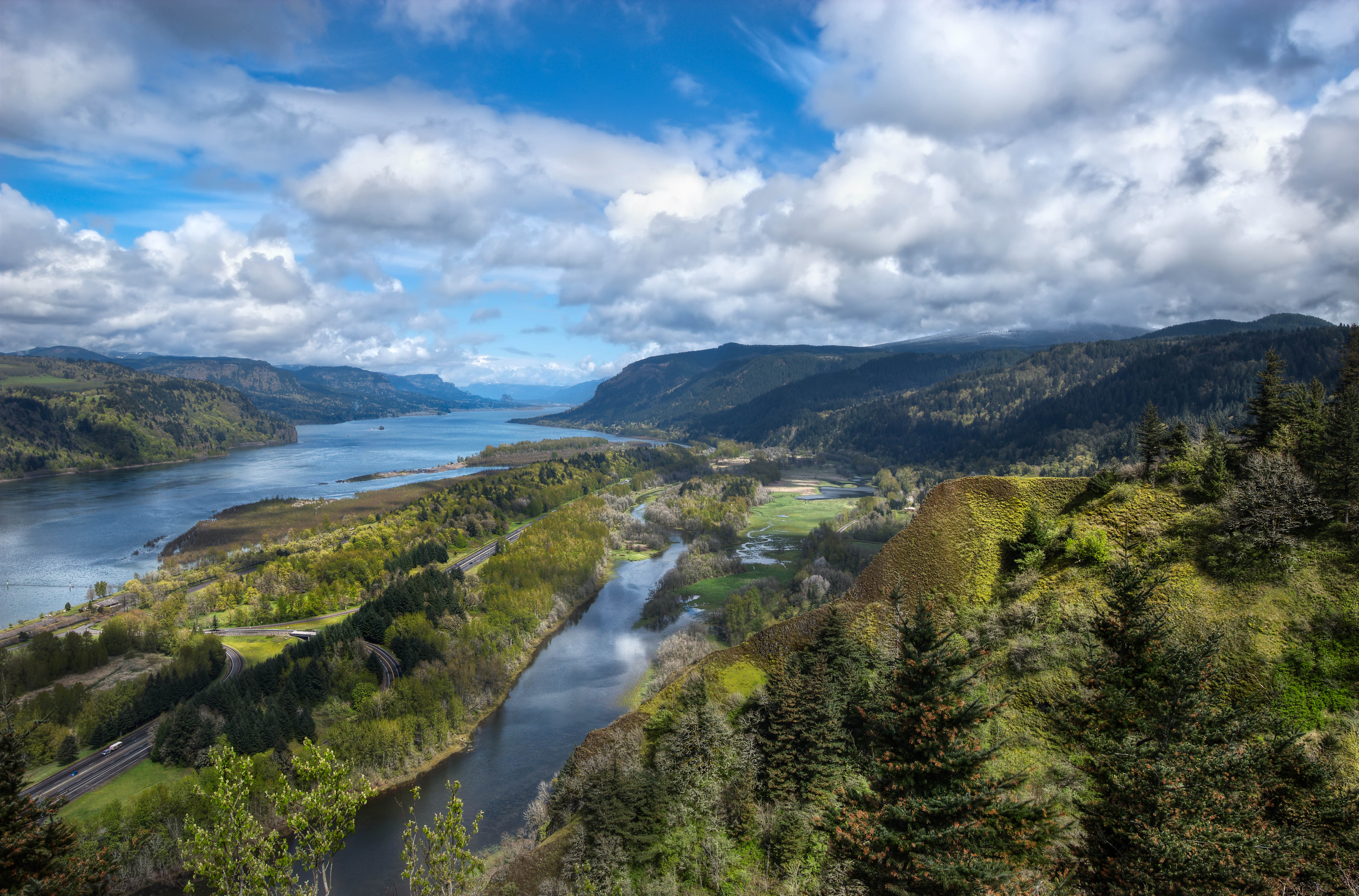
View from Crown Point looking over the Columbia River Gorge

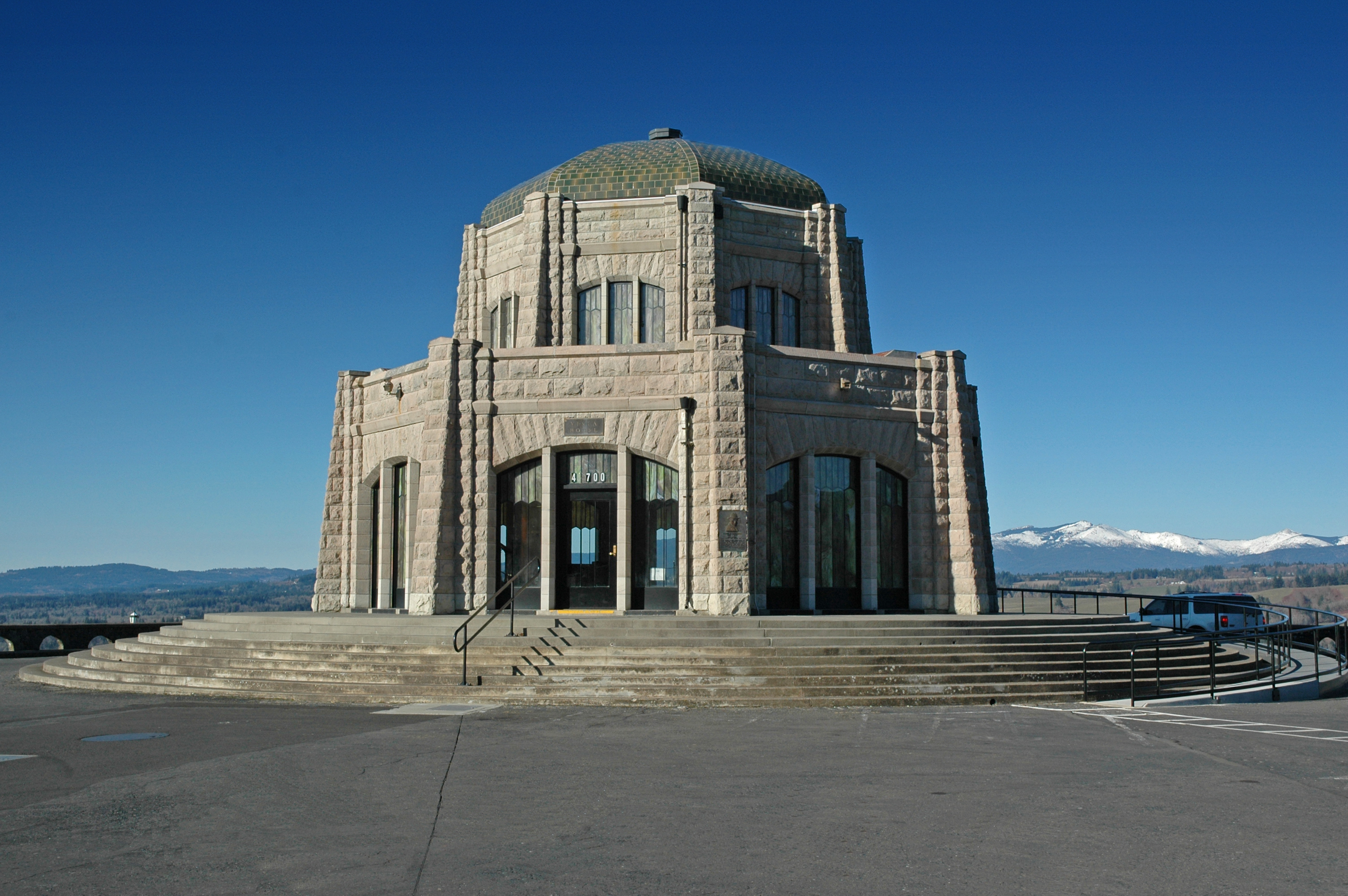
Vista House

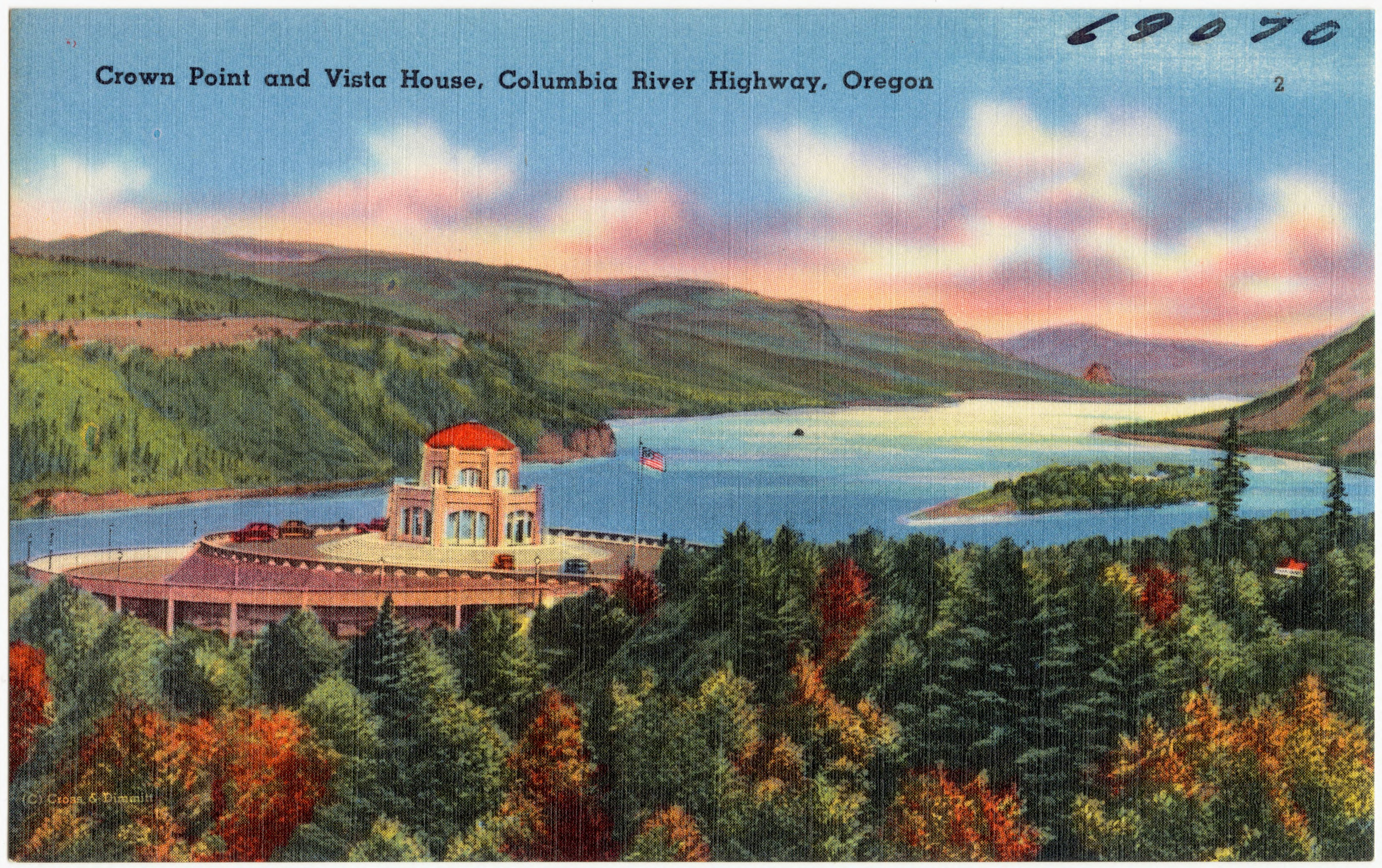
A postcard of Crown Point from circa 1930–1945

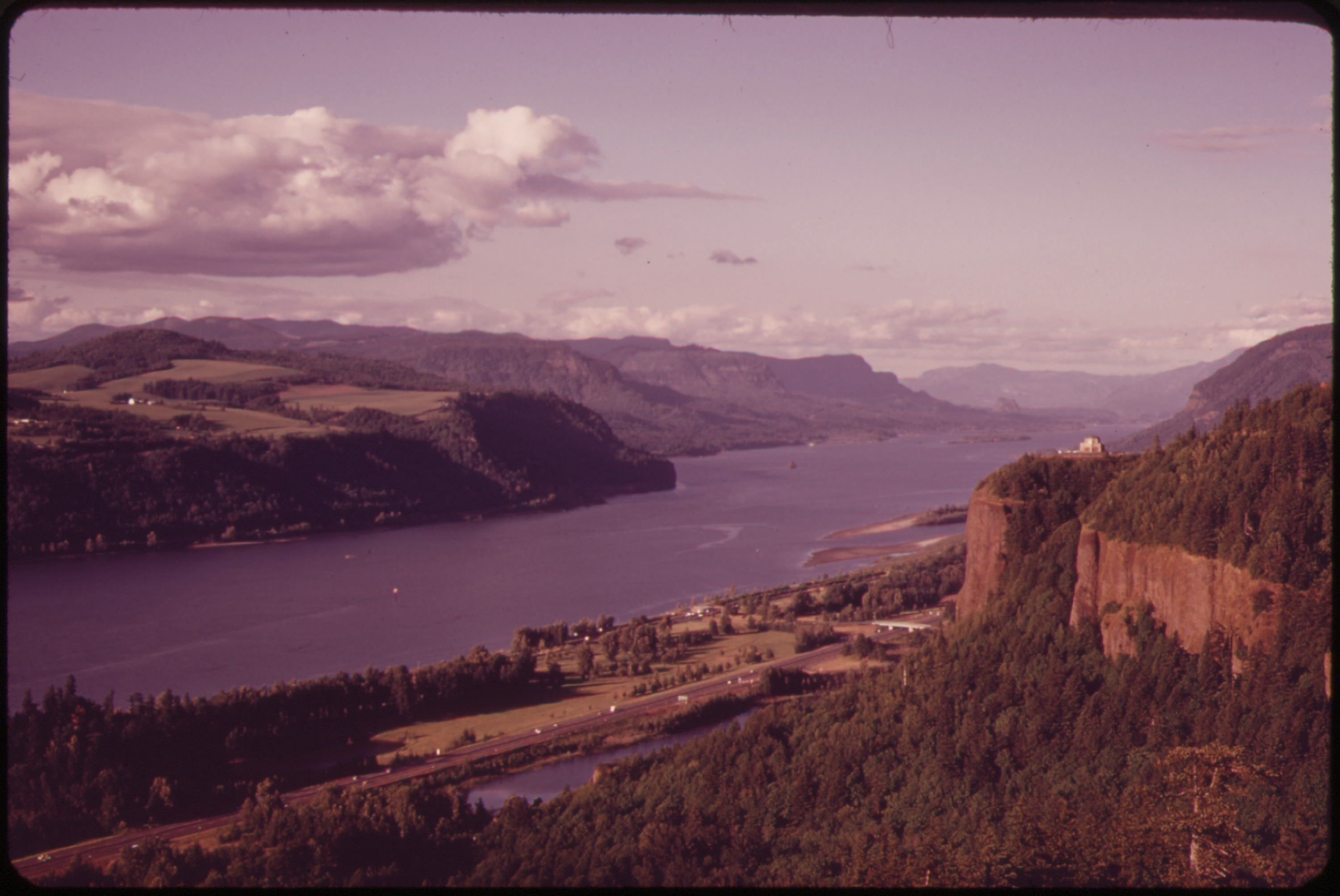
Crown Point in 1973

== Crown Point Viaduct ==
The Crown Point Viaduct, built in 1914, is a viaduct consisting of an elevated sidewalk supported by columns and a retaining wall which encircle the tight loop of roadway around Vista House (1918). The viaduct is a contributing structure in the National Historic Landmarked and National Register of Historic Places-listed Historic Columbia River Highway. Per the 2000 NHL nomination of the highway:

This 560-foot [170 m] spiral viaduct was constructed of reinforced concrete and runs for 225 degrees of a circle around Crown Point. It functions as a 7-foot-wide [2.1 m] sidewalk and curb with a 4-foot-high [1.2 m] parapet wall on the outside of a 24-foot [7.3 m] roadway cut into the rock formation. A dry masonry retaining wall stabilizes the hillside above and below the viaduct and masonry parapet walls that ring Vista House.

== See also ==
- Interstate 84 in Oregon
- List of bridges documented by the Historic American Engineering Record in Oregon
- List of bridges on the National Register of Historic Places in Oregon
- US Route 30 in Oregon
