= Half viaduct =

Type of viaduct

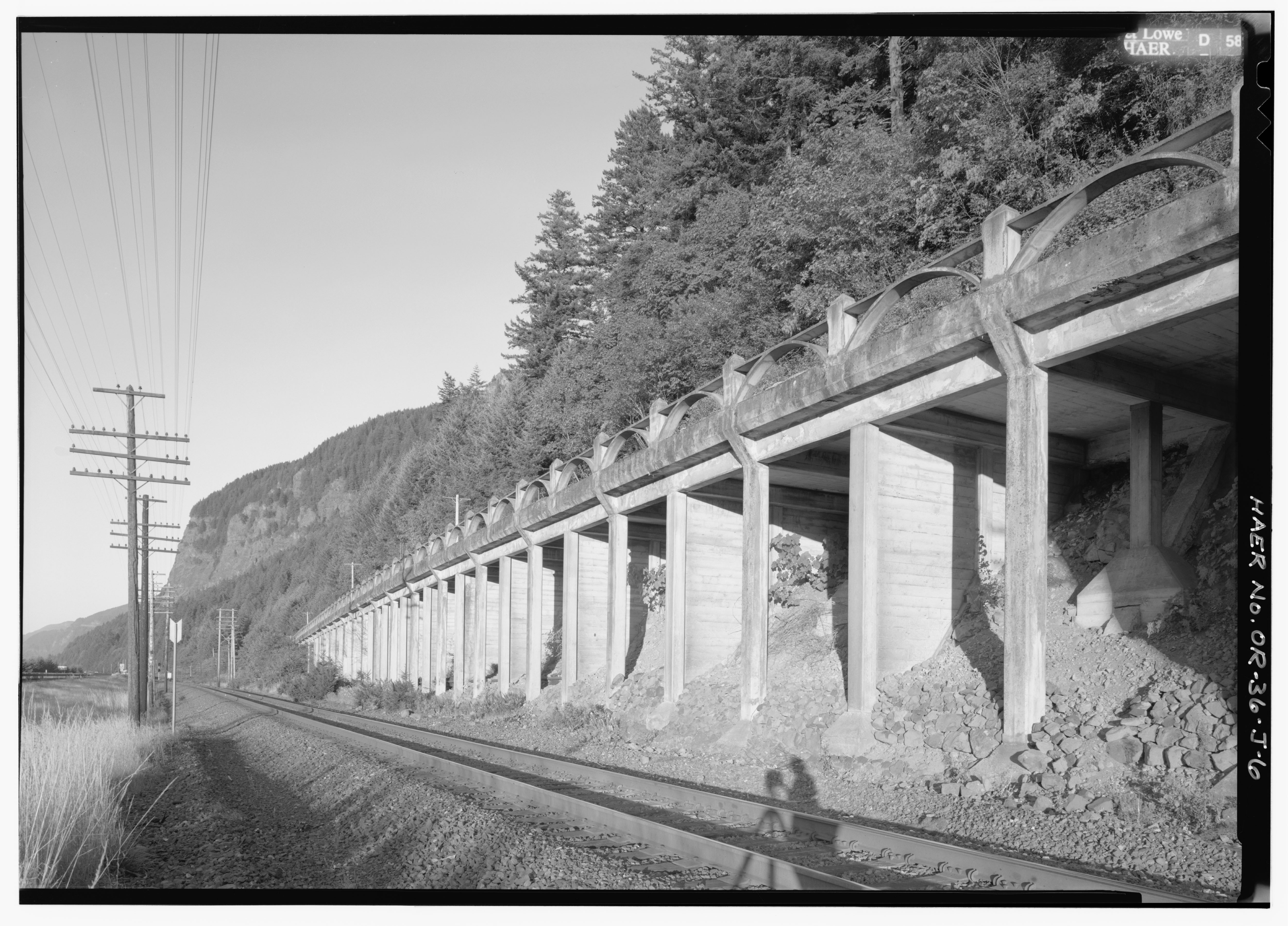
A half viaduct on the Historic Columbia River Highway

A half viaduct is a type of viaduct built into a hillside, where only part of the road is supported by the structure.
