= Chanticleer Point =

Geographic feature in Oregon, US

Portland Women's Forum State Scenic Viewpoint
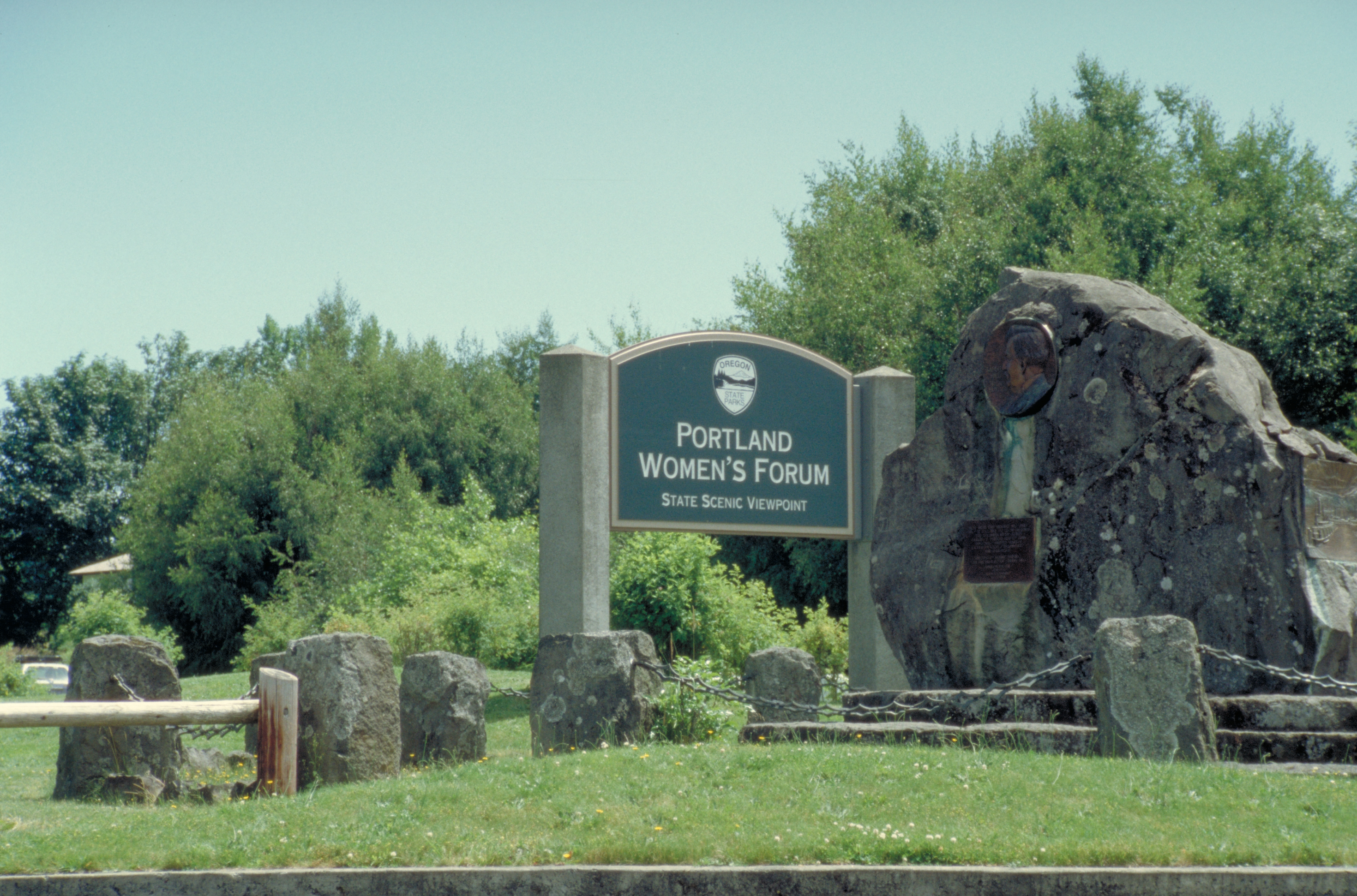

- Location within Oregon Location within the United States
- Interactive map of Portland Women's Forum State Scenic Viewpoint
- Type: Public, state
- Location: Multnomah County, Oregon
- Nearest city: Gresham
- Coordinates: 45°32′14″N 122°15′57″W
- Operator: Oregon Parks and Recreation Department

Chanticleer Point is a geographical landmark on the Oregon side of the Columbia River Gorge. It is the first notable overlook encountered traveling east on the Historic Columbia River Highway. It is a typical location from which to take photos of the gorge featuring Crown Point and the Vista House prominently. It overlooks Rooster Rock State Park.

The overlook is part of the Oregon state park system and its official name is the Portland Women's Forum State Scenic Viewpoint. A plaque placed at the site describes the Forum's support of this landmark.

== History ==
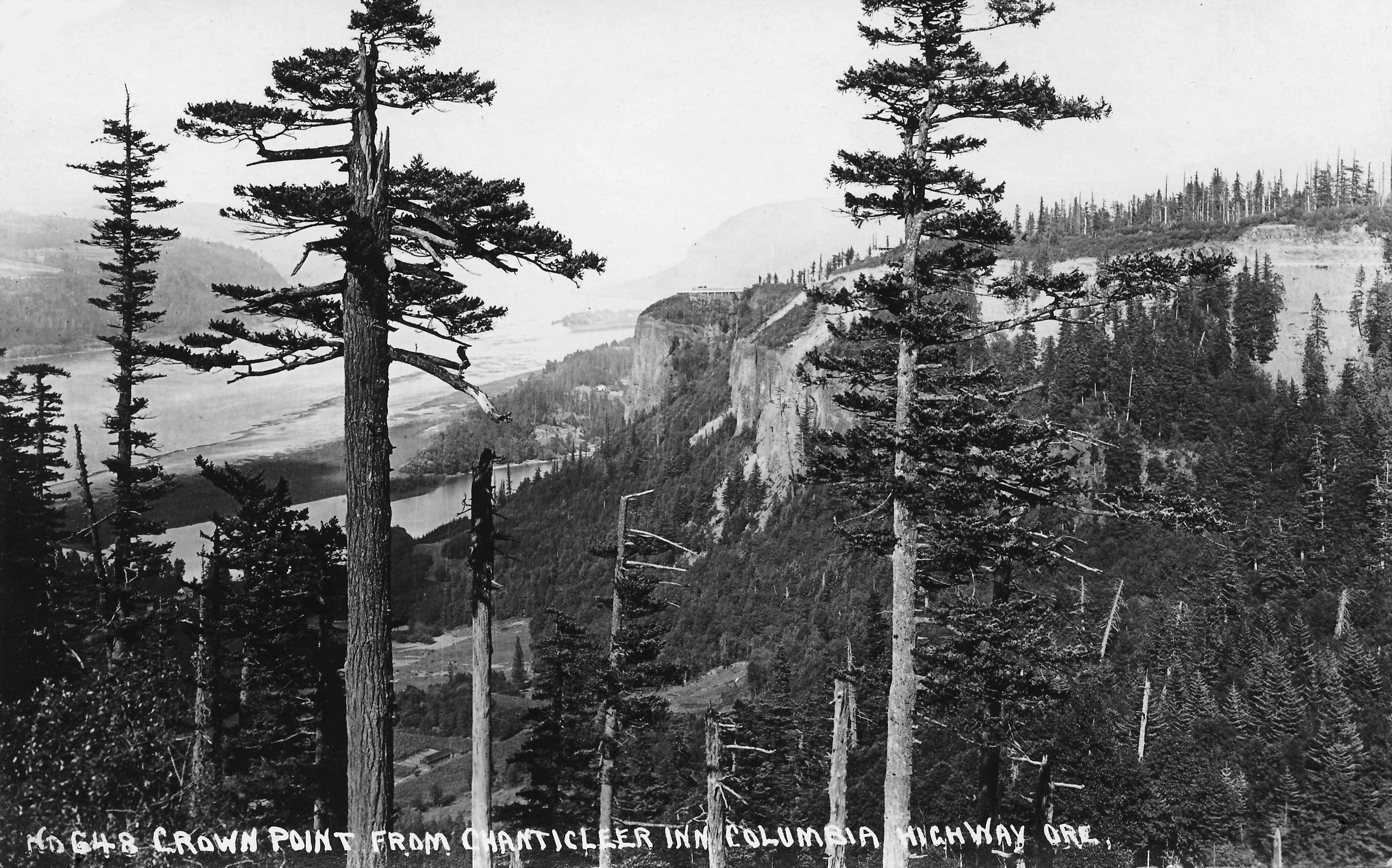
Crown Point from Chanticleer Point circa 1912-1915

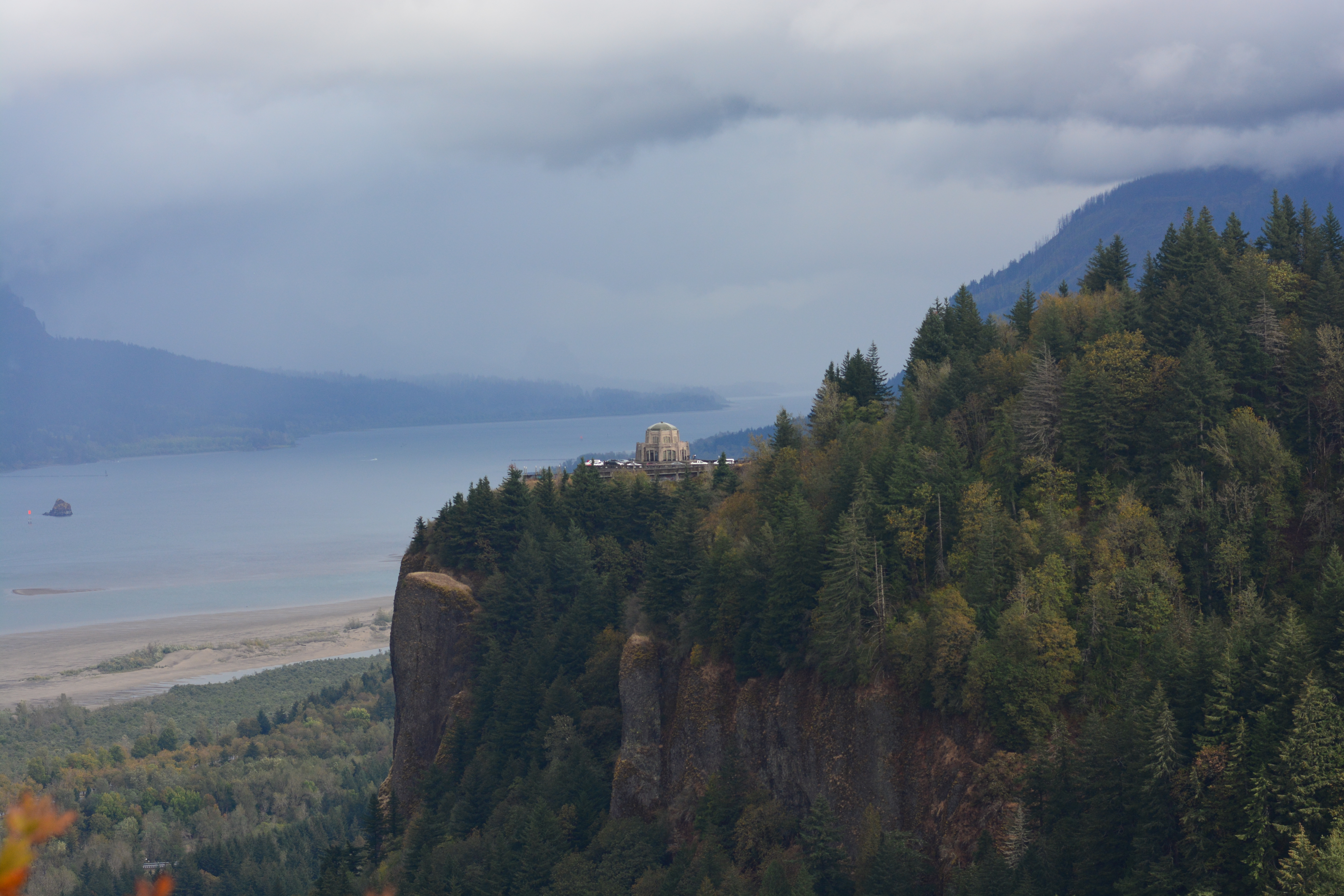
The same view in 2009

In 1912, Meier & Frank waitress M.E. Margaret Henderson partnered with A.R. Morgan and his wife to open Chanticleer Inn, a restaurant, on the site that now belongs to the park. The inn was known for its chicken and salmon dinners, cooked mostly by Henderson, and notably did not serve or allow alcohol. The inn hosted multiple Presidents, foreign dignitaries, and military officials. Henderson sold her share of the restaurant in 1914 and opened the Latourell Falls Chalet, a similar establishment, further upriver.

Before 1915, when the Columbia River Highway was built, the only way to the inn was by taking a boat or train to Rooster Rock, and walking or riding up a steep, unpaved road. On October 8, 1930, the Chanticleer Inn burnt down. While the exact reason is unknown, it is said that a drunk patron left a lit cigarette in the restroom garbage can due to being upset at the lack of alcohol.

In 1946, the Portland Women's Forum was founded with the purpose of preserving and beautifying the Columbia River Gorge. In 1956, they purchased the site of the former inn from Julius L. Meyer Jr. (son of former Oregon Governor Julius Meier) using money raised from various teas, fashion shows, doll shows, and other various fundraisers. Life memberships were also sold, and life members name's were placed on a plaque at the park. In October 1962, the site was donated to the State of Oregon under the condition that the park be named after the Portland Women's Forum.

In 1963, the newly built Interstate 84 caused most through traffic to bypass the park.

== Amenities ==
Portland Women's Forum State Scenic Viewpoint has multiple memorials and monuments as well as a few viewpoint areas. A short hiking trail, remnants of the original road to the point, is accessible from the parking lot as well.

== Gallery ==
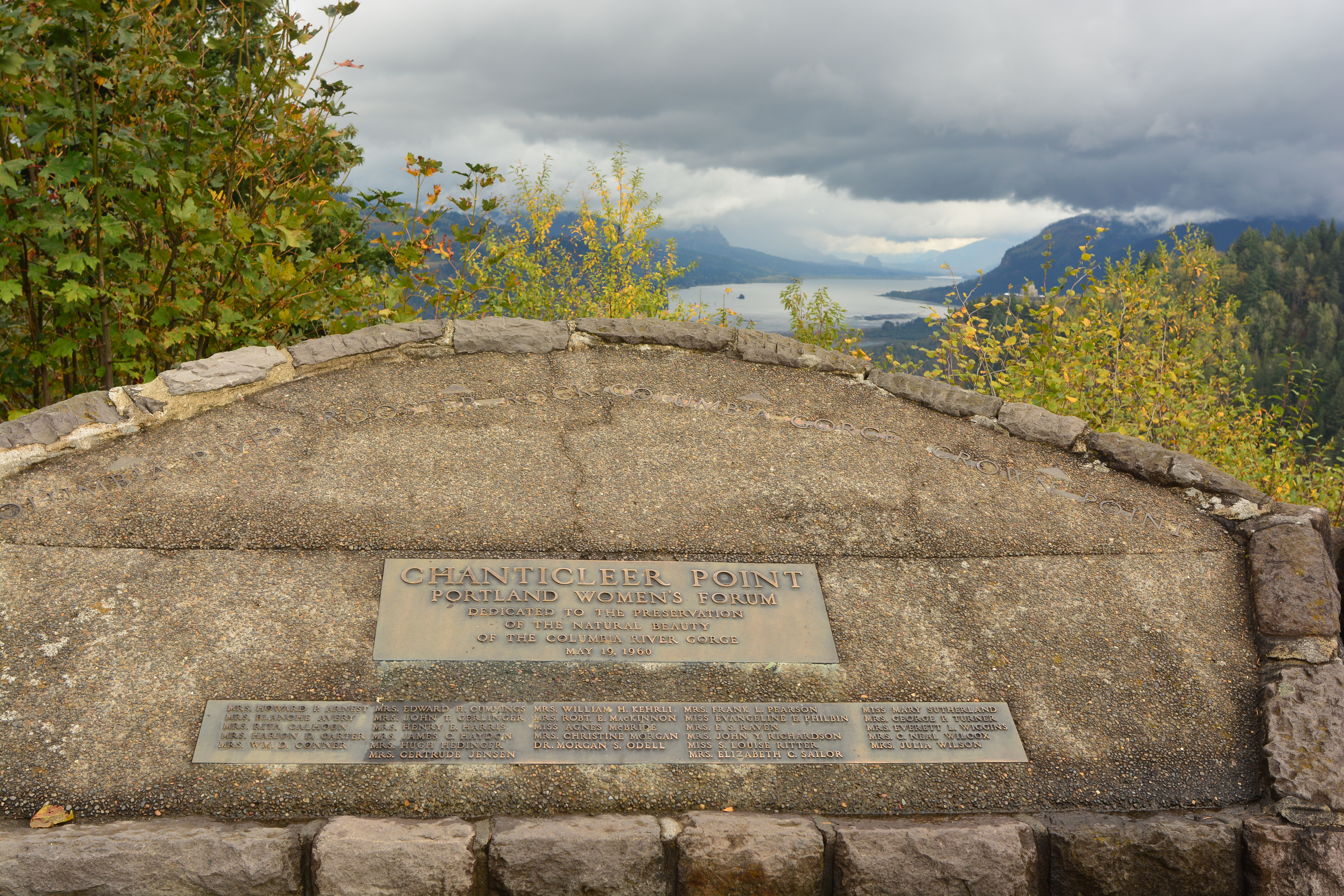
The main memorial stone with the names of Portland Women's Forum Life Members and arrows and names of various features visible from the point.

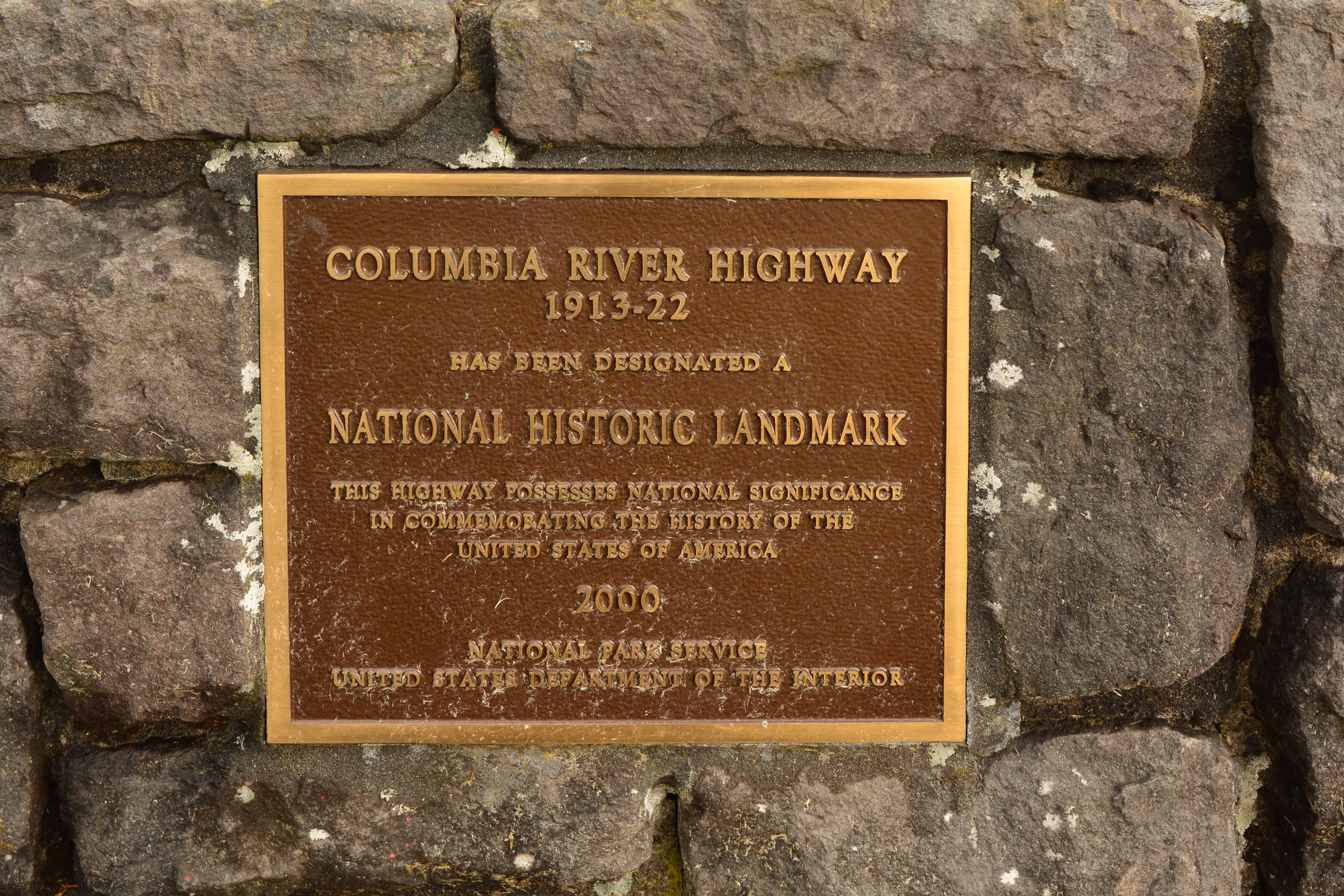
The official National Historic Landmark plaque

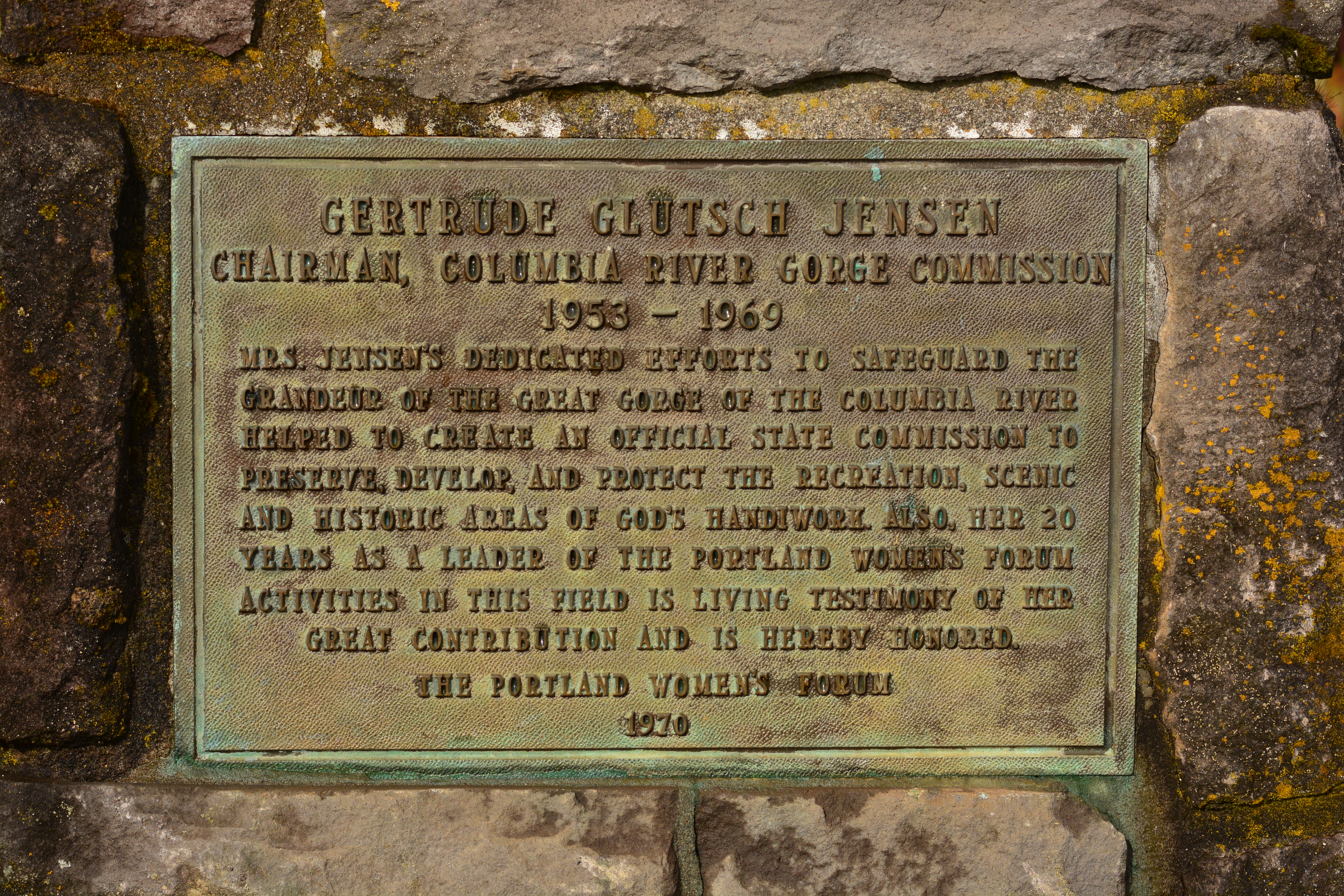
A memorial plaque to Gertrude Glutsch Jensen who was Chair of the Columbia Gorge Commission

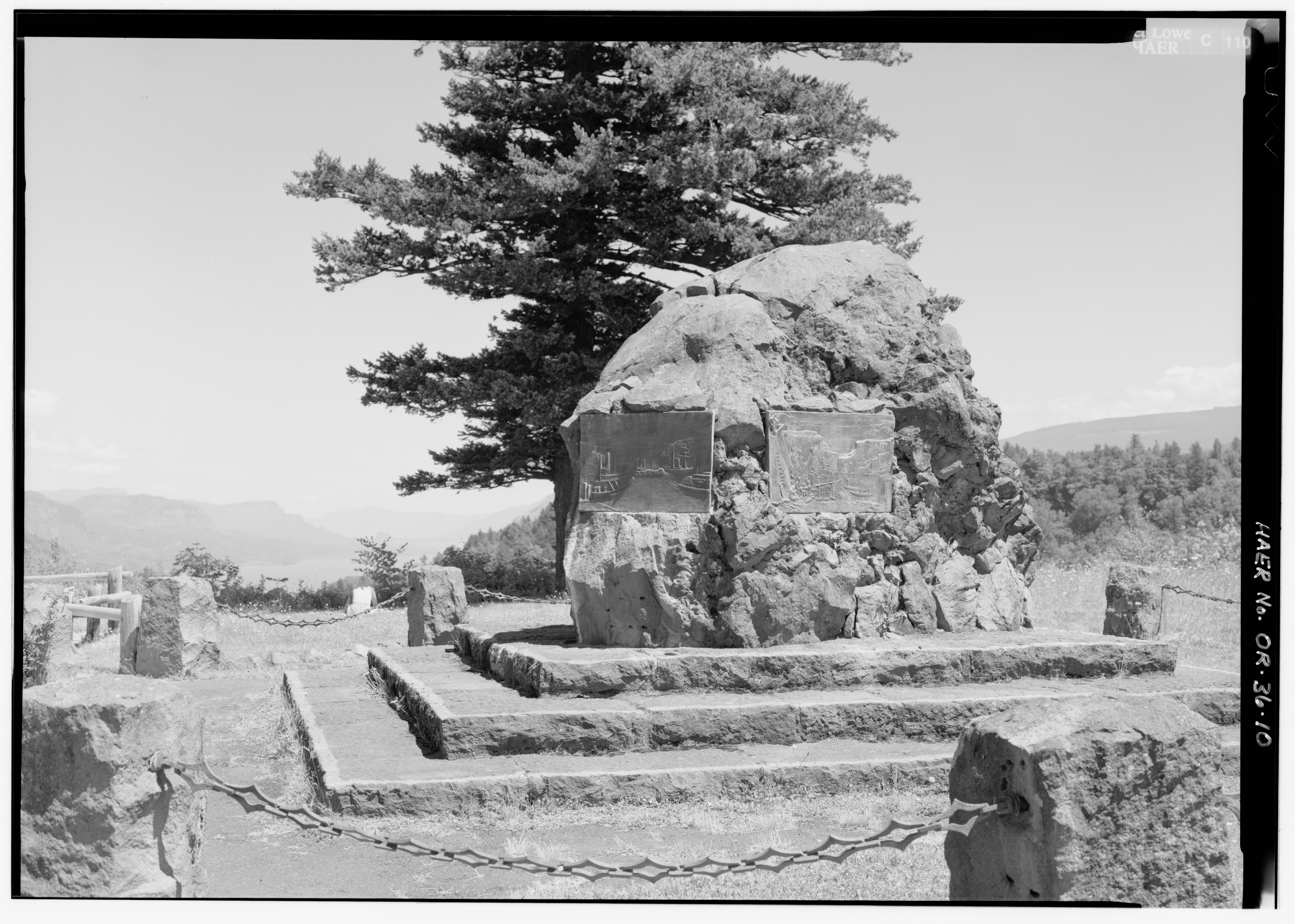
Sam Hill Memorial Rock, date unknown. Hill was one of the main promoters of the Columbia River Highway.

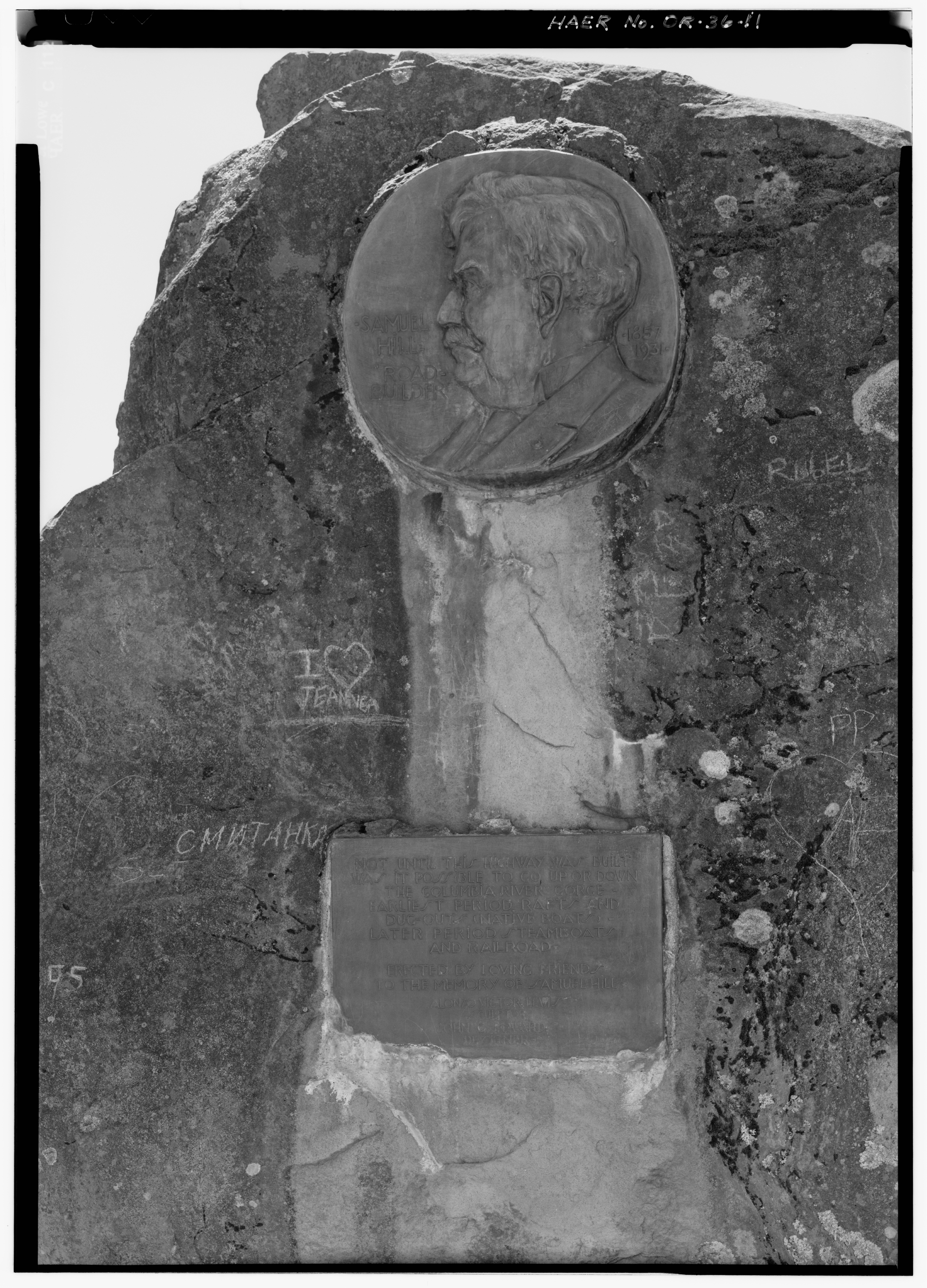
The Sam Hill Memorial Rock in 1995.

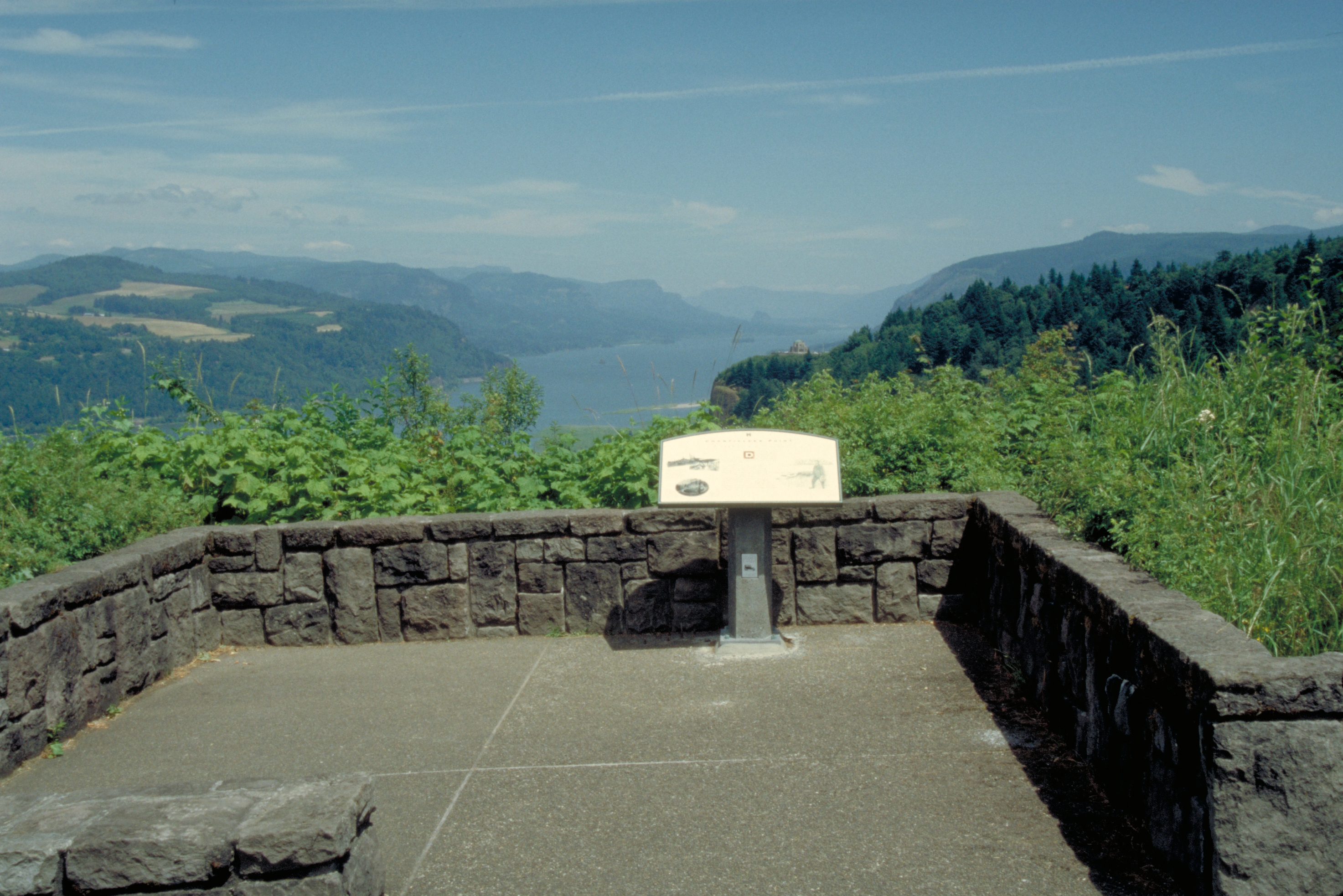
Chanticleer Point in 1995
