= Columbia Hills (Washington) =

Area of hills in Washington state, US

Coordinates: 45°44′24″N 120°47′09″W

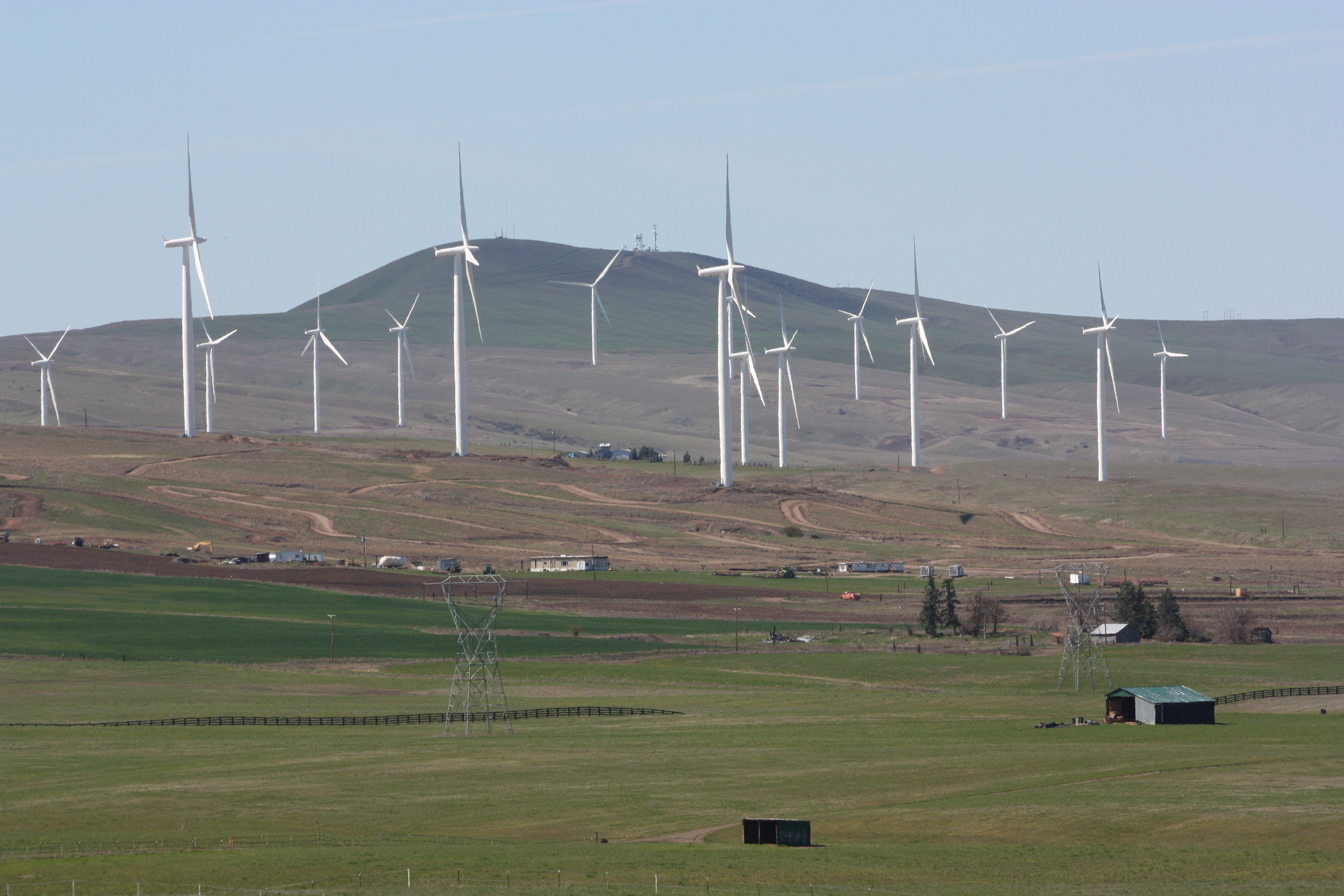
Windy Flats wind farm, with a capacity of 190 MW, is located in the Columbia Hills

The Columbia Hills is a landform of hills and small mountains along the northern bank of the Columbia River located in Klickitat County, in south-central Washington state. They have a maximum elevation of 2,667 feet (813 m).

== Columbia Hills Historical State Park ==
Columbia Hills Historical State Park
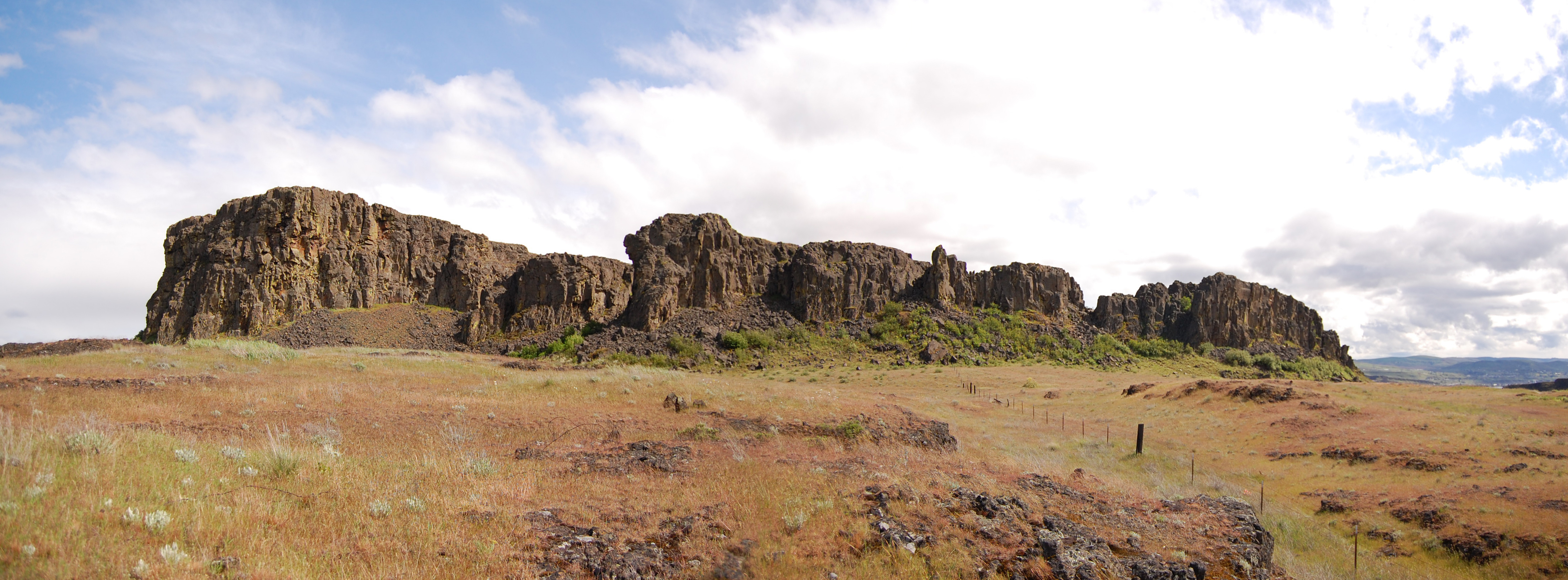
- Horsethief Butte, in Columbia Hills Historical State Park
- Interactive map of Columbia Hills Historical State Park
- Type: State Park
- Location: Klickitat County, Washington, USA
- Area: 3,637 acres (5.7 sq mi)

The 3,637-acre (5.7 sq mi) Columbia Hills Historical State Park lies in the Columbia Hills. It includes Horsethief Lake, a reservoir created by The Dalles Dam with 7,500 feet (2,286 m) of freshwater shoreline on the Columbia River.. The park is full of climbing, biking, horseback riding and parasailing opportunities and the lake is open for boating, windsurfing and diving.
