= Mayer State Park =

State park in Oregon, United States

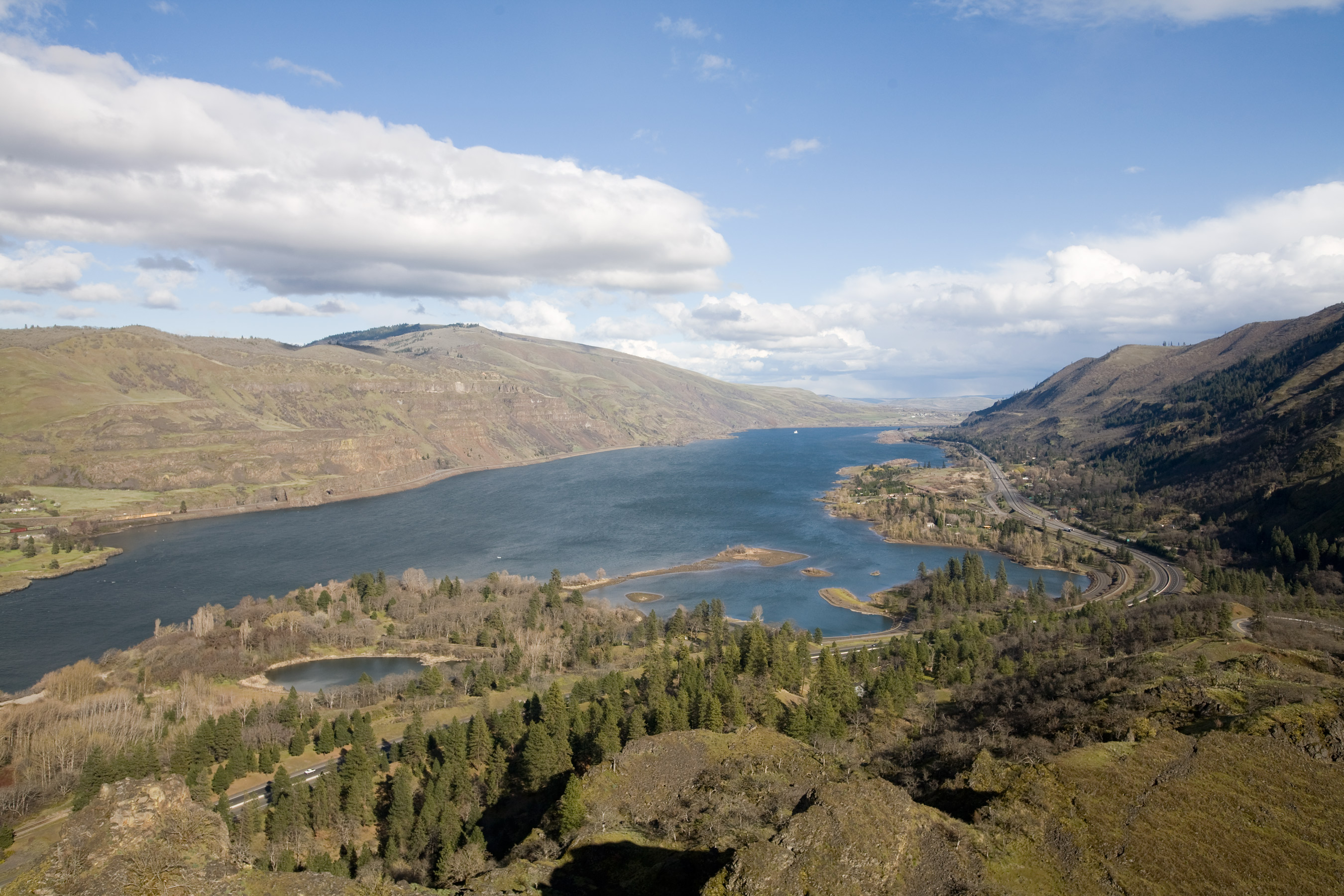
- View east of the Columbia River from Rowena Crest

- Location within Oregon Location within the United States
- Type: Public, state
- Location: Wasco County, Oregon
- Nearest city: The Dalles
- Coordinates: 45°40′32″N 121°16′11″W
- Operator: Oregon Parks and Recreation Department

Mayer State Park is a state park in the Columbia River Gorge, near Rowena, Oregon in Wasco County in the U.S. state of Oregon. It consists of several disjointed parcels of transected by Interstate 84 and the tracks of the Union Pacific Railroad.

The south-easternmost parcel includes the Rowena Loops, a series of horseshoe curves by which the Historic Columbia River Highway (U.S. Route 30) climbs to the Rowena Crest, where there is an overlook, from the community of Rowena.

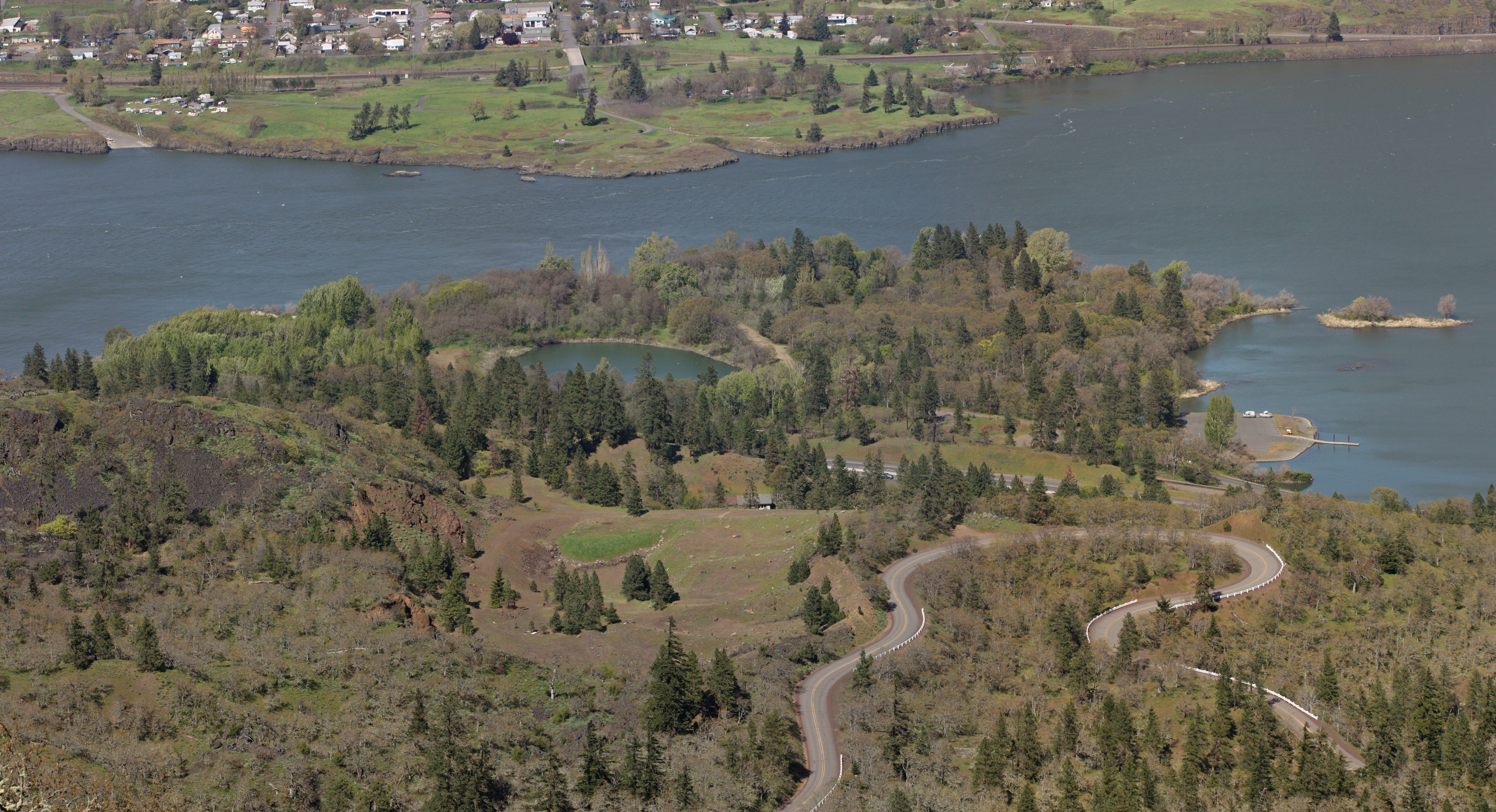
The lower portion of the park includes a small lake, boat ramp, and the Rowena Loops of the Historic Columbia River Highway.

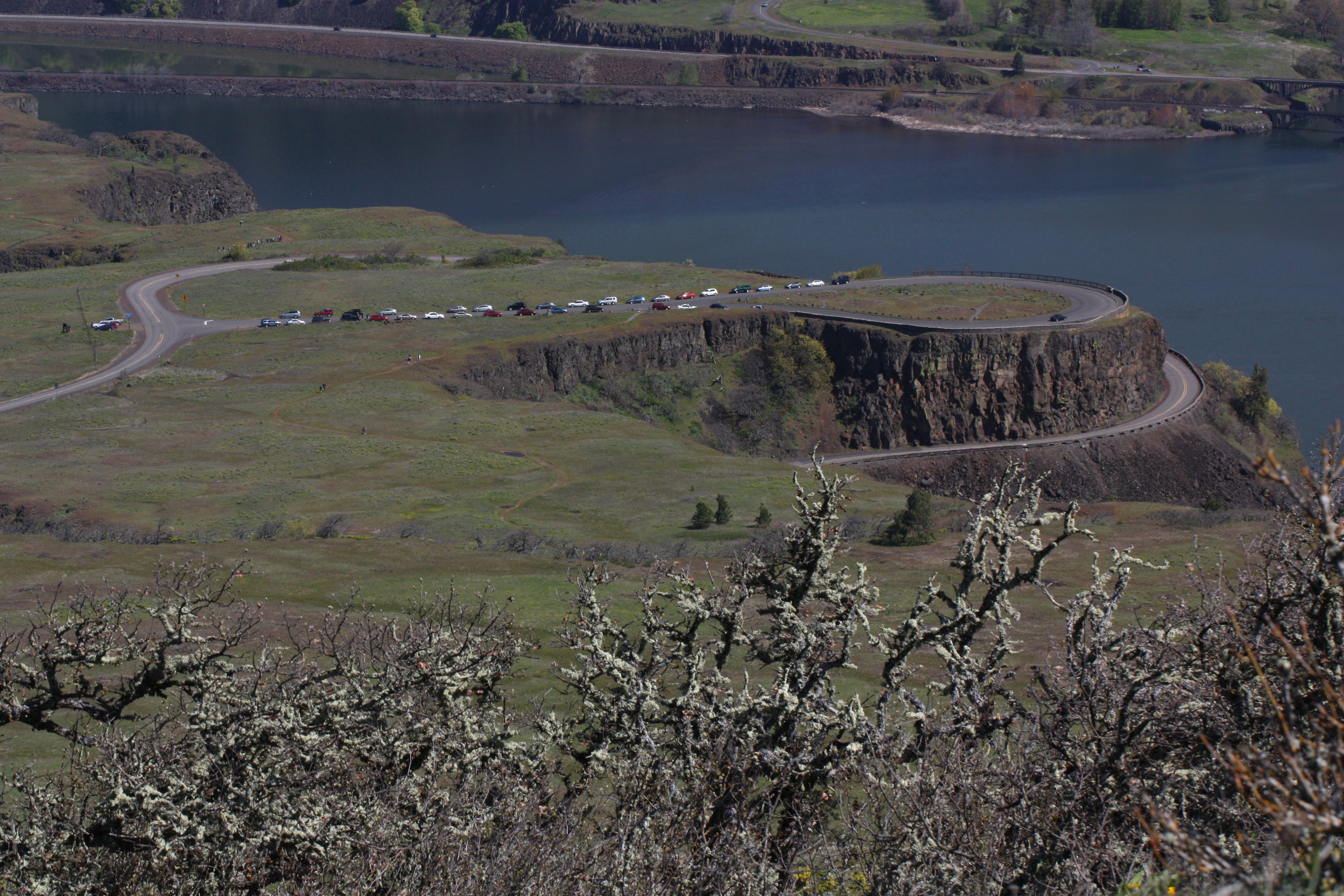
The upper portion of the park includes Rowena Crest, a viewpoint with interpretive signs, and Rowena Plateau.
