= Kaci =

Kaci or KACI may refer to:

== People ==
- Kaci Battaglia (born 1987), American singer
- Kaci Brown (born 1988), American pop and R&B singer
- Kaci Fennell (born 1992), Jamaican model
- Kaci Kullmann Five (1951–2017), Norwegian politician and business professional
- Kaci Aitchison, anchor and features reporter for Q13 FOX News
- Aurélie Kaci (born 1989), French football midfielder and defender
- Benet Kaci (born 1978), Kosovan journalist and talk host
- Eklent Kaçi (born 1999), Albanian pool player
- Kaci Walfall (born 2004), American actress

== Places ==
- Kaci-badon, California, former Pomo settlement in Lake County, California

== Other ==
- KACI (AM), a radio station (1300 AM) licensed to The Dalles, Oregon, United States
- KACI-FM, a radio station (93.5 FM) licensed to The Dalles, Oregon, United States
