= KODL =

Radio station in The Dalles, Oregon

- The Dalles, Oregon; United States
- Broadcast area: Columbia Gorge
- Frequency: 1440 kHz
- Branding: KODL FM 100.7 & AM 1440

Programming
- Format: News/Talk
- Affiliations: Westwood One, CBS News

Ownership
- Owner: Larson-Wynn, Inc.

History
- First air date: October 1940 (at 1230)
- Former call signs: KODL (1940–1973); KGLX (1973–1974)
- Former frequencies: 1230 kHz (1940–1955)

Technical information
- Licensing authority: FCC
- Facility ID: 36629
- Class: B
- Power: 1,000 watts day 370 watts night
- Transmitter coordinates: 45°37′11.4″N 121°6′3.3″W
- Translators: 99.1 K256AC (The Dalles); 100.7 K264DF (The Dalles)

Links
- Public license information: Public file; LMS
- Webcast: Listen Live
- Website: kodl.com

KODL (1440 AM) is a radio station licensed to serve The Dalles, Oregon, United States. The station, which began broadcasting in October 1940, is currently owned by Larson-Wynn, Inc.

The station was assigned the KODL call sign by the Federal Communications Commission (FCC).

== Programming ==
KODL broadcasts a news/talk format. In addition to its usual music programming, KODL airs hourly newscasts from CBS News, a one-hour block of news each weekday morning, a daily tradio program called "The KODL Trading Post", Dave Ramsey's Daily Money Makeover, the "KODL Coffee Break" daily talk show, a one-hour noon newscast, the Northwest Regional edition of The Lars Larson Show, and one hour of news each weekday evening with a mix of local and national programming.

KODL also airs Oregon State Beavers football and Seattle Seahawks games.

== History ==
Western Radio Corporation's KODL began broadcasting in October 1940, although sources differ on whether these broadcasts began on October 12, October 19, or October 20th. The station originally broadcast on a frequency of 1230 kHz with 250 watts of power during the day and 100 watts at night. KODL originally aired a mix of recorded and live popular music, including a number of local musical talents. The station changed broadcast frequencies to 1440 kHz and was allowed to increase its signal strength to 1,000 watts, day and night, beginning in 1955.

KODL's founder and Western Radio Corporation owner, V. Barney Kenworthy, sold the station to the Sterling Recreation Organization in September 1967. The Seattle-based SRO immediately flipped KODL's format to rock music. In late 1973, Sterling owner Fredric A. Danz had the station's call sign changed to KGLX and flipped the format to a "contemporary gold" music mix.

The station was acquired by Larson-Wynn, Inc., on September 1, 1974. The new owners immediately restored the historic KODL call sign and began broadcasting a mix of rock and middle of the road music. In the late 1970s, KODL received permission from the FCC to increase its daytime signal strength to 5,000 watts while maintaining its 1,000 watt signal at night. By 1979, KODL would be playing a pure MOR format but in 1982, in the wake of Urban Cowboy and the sudden growth in country music, KODL switched to a country music format.

From 1940 to 1999, KODL broadcast from a studio building and tower located on West Scenic Drive. Since 1999, KODL's studios have been located in downtown The Dalles. In 2000, KODL switched musical formats to a satellite-delivered adult standards and nostalgia format branded as "America's Best Music".

On November 26, 2025, KODL changed their format from classic country to news/talk.

== Former on-air staff ==
Paul E. Walden worked at KODL for 27 years, more than 20 of them as station manager, and served as the president of the Oregon Association of Broadcasters from 1954 to 1956. He later purchased KIHR in Hood River, Oregon, and established KCGB-FM, during his 48-year career in broadcasting as an announcer, manager, and engineer. Walden also served three terms as a member of the Oregon House of Representatives in the 1970s.
