= Jernstedt =

Jernstedt is a surname. Notable people with the surname include:

- Kenneth Jernstedt (1917–2013), American pilot, politician, and businessman
  - Ken Jernstedt Airfield
- Tom Jernstedt (1944–2020), American basketball administrator
