= Paul Crandall =

American politician

Paul Crandall (September 20, 1802 - January 9, 1889) was a farmer from Lima, Wisconsin, who spent a single one-year term as a Whig member of the Wisconsin State Assembly from the district of Rock County consisting of the towns of Beloit, Clinton and Turtle, during the 1849 session. He succeeded fellow Whig Robert T. Carey, and would be succeeded in 1850 by another Whig, John A. Segar.

He had been a member of the second constitutional convention which wrote the constitution under which Wisconsin achieved statehood in 1848.

On January 6, 1851, he was elected as a member of the board of directors of the newly organized Rock County Agricultural Society and Mechanics Institute.

He and his wife, the former Sally Stillman, would later emigrate to Oregon. He died January 9, 1889, in Salem, Oregon, and is buried in the Salem Pioneer Cemetery.

Their grandson, Thomas R. Coon, would become mayor of Hood River, Oregon, and serve as a Republican member of the Oregon House of Representatives.
