= The Dalles High School =

School in Oregon, United States

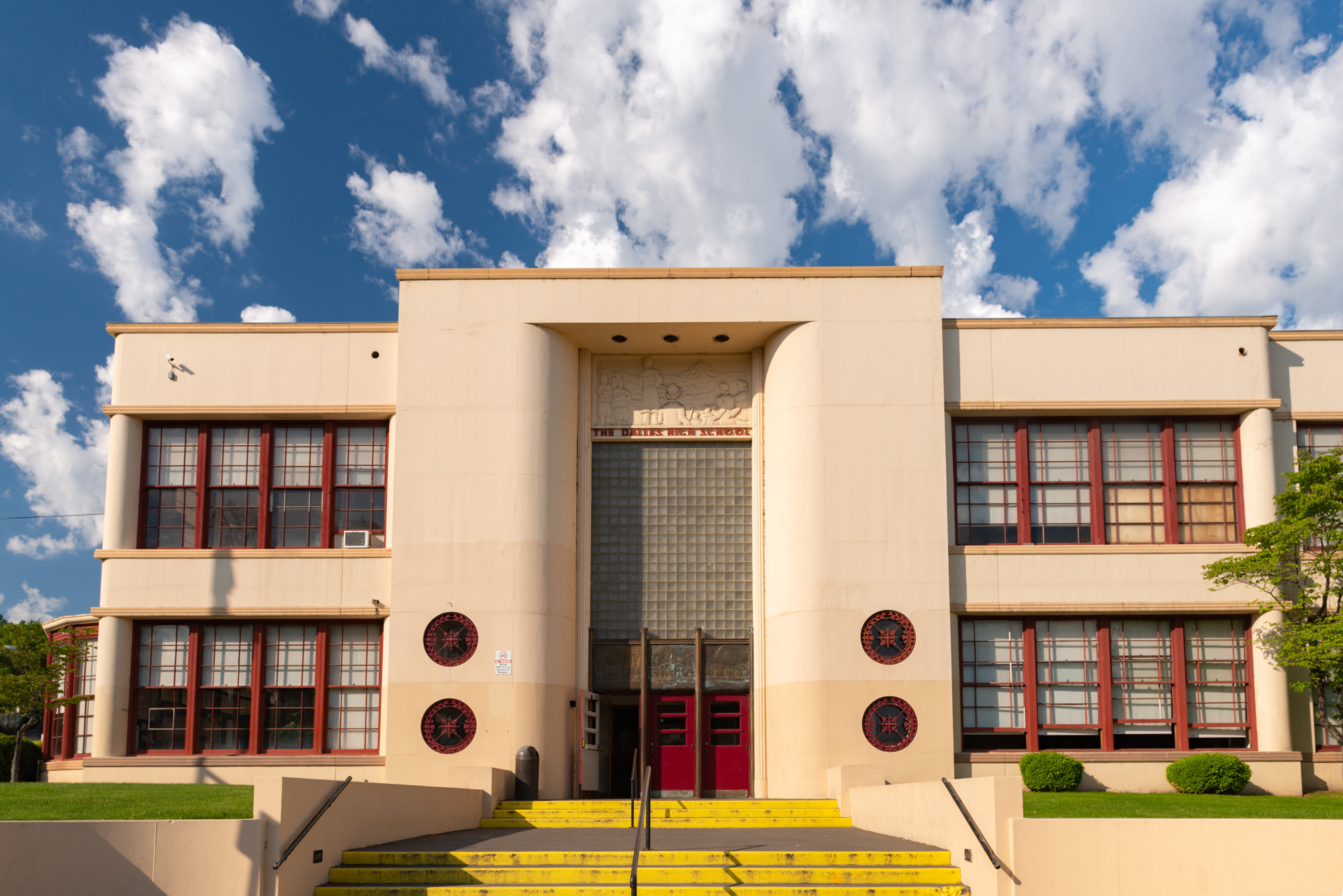

Location
- 220 East 10th Street; The Dalles, Oregon 97058; United States; 45.5958°N 121.1876°W

Information
- School district: North Wasco County 21
- Principal: Phil Williams
- Teaching staff: 40.38 (FTE)
- Grades: 9-12
- Enrollment: 795 (2024–2025)
- Student to teacher ratio: 19.69
- Colors: Crimson & Gold
- Athletics conference: OSAA 4A-2 Tri-Valley Conference
- Mascot: Riverhawk
- Team name: Riverhawks
- Rival: Hood River Valley High School, Pendleton High School (Oregon)
- Website: www.nwasco.k12.or.us/apps/pages/TDHS

The Dalles High School (TDHS), formerly The Dalles Wahtonka High School (TDW) is a public high school located in The Dalles, Oregon, United States. It houses students from both The Dalles and the adjacent town of Mosier.

== History ==
In 2004, North Wasco County School Districts 9 and 12 combined to form one school district in The Dalles: SD 21 (this number being chosen as it is the sum of 9 and 12). School District 21 immediately combined Wahtonka High School and The Dalles High School into "The Dalles Wahtonka Union High School". Later the "Union" was dropped, shortening the name to "The Dalles Wahtonka High School".

In 2012, the Oregon State Board of Education adopted a rule to ban the use of Native American names and imagery for use in school mascots. As a result, The Dalles-Wahtonka High School changed its name to The Dalles High School, and its mascot from the Eagle-Indians to the Riverhawks, in April 2014. The 2014–2015 school year was the first year of The Dalles Riverhawks.

== Campus ==
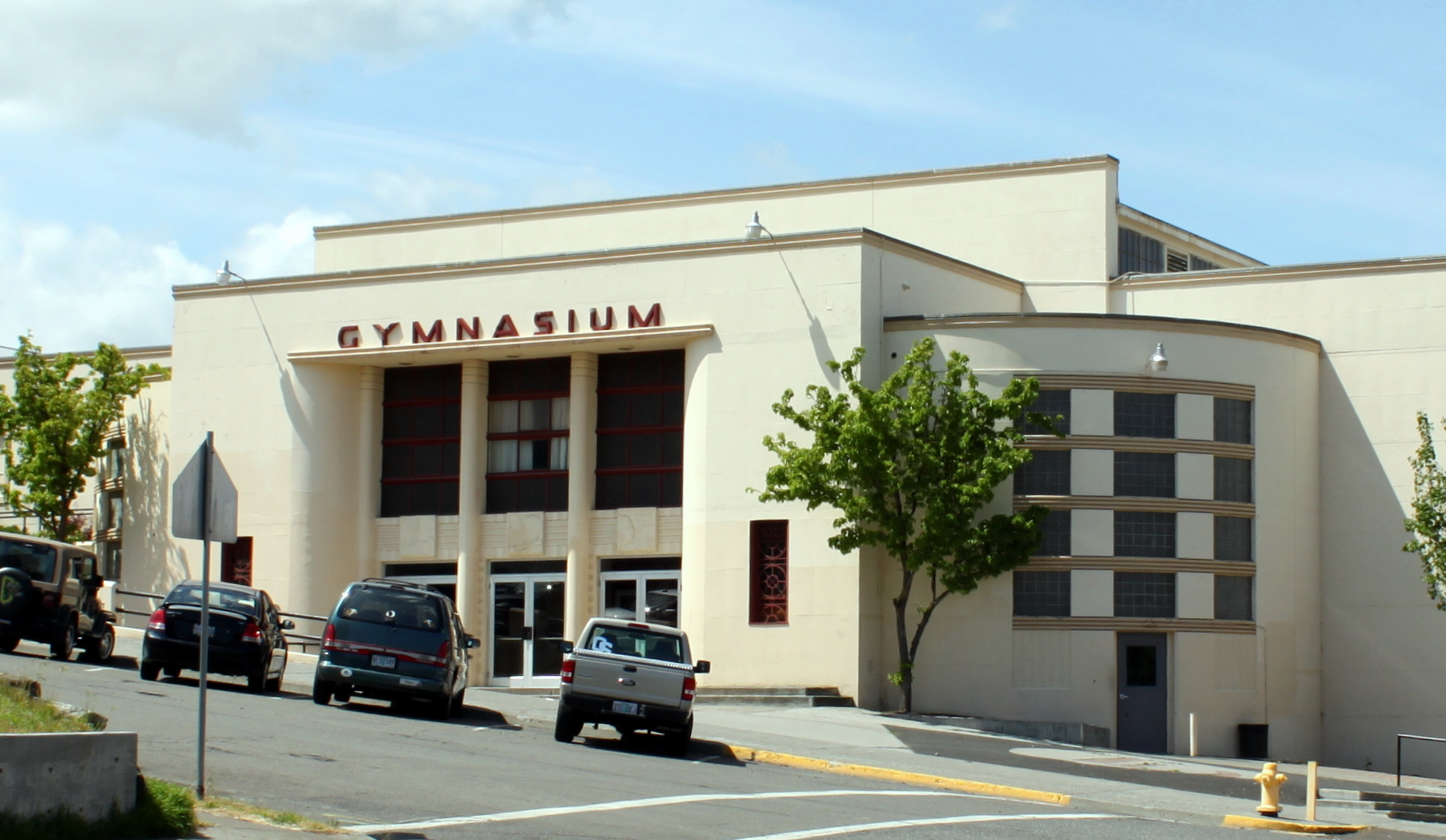
Main campus gymnasium

=== Main campus ===
The main campus has housed grades 9–12 since the 2009–2010 school year.

== Academics ==
The Dalles High School currently uses a Trimester system as opposed to the standard semester System. The Dalles hosts a number of required common academics courses as well as offering College Now courses with an agreement with Columbia Gorge Community College to earn college credit early. The Dalles High School also offers students Advanced Placement Courses as another means to earn accredited college credit prior to graduating High School.

=== List of current Advanced Placement courses ===
- US History
- European History
- World History
- US Government
- Literature
- Language and Composition
- Biology
- Art

In 2018, 85% of the school's seniors received a high school diploma.

The Dalles High School also offers six current career and technical education (C.T.E) programs and currently is in the process of adding a seventh for students to participate in.

=== List of current CTE programs ===
- Woods/Construction
- Welding/Fabrication
- Automechanics
- Culinary
- Graphic Arts
- Computer Science/Information Technology
- Robotics

== Clubs ==
The Dalles High School has professional Robotics which competes in the VEX Robotics Competition.

Club Name	Season	Accomplishments
Robotics	2024-25	2025 Oregon State VEX Robotics Champions.
Robotics	2023-24	2024 Oregon State VEX Robotics Champions, 2024 Oregon State VEX Robotics Excellence Award, 2024 Oregon State VEX Robotics Build Award.
Robotics	2022-23	2023 Oregon State VEX Robotics Champions, 2023 Oregon State VEX Robotics Excellence Award
Robotics	2021-22	2022 Oregon State VEX Robotics Champions, 2022 VEX Robotics World Championship Opportunity Division Winner
Robotics	2017-18	2018 Oregon State VEX Robotics Champions

== Athletics ==
The Dalles High School currently fields 21 sports teams sponsored by OSAA.

Sport Name	Season	League
Football	Fall	4A-SD2 Special District 2
Volleyball	Fall	4A-2 Tri-Valley Conference
Boys Soccer	Fall	4A-2 Tri-Valley Conference
Girls Soccer	Fall	4A-2 Tri-Valley Conference
Boys Cross Country	Fall	4A-2 Tri-Valley Conference
Girls Cross Country	Fall	4A-2 Tri-Valley Conference
Boys Basketball	Winter	4A-2 Tri-Valley Conference
Girls Basketball	Winter	4A-2 Tri-Valley Conference
Boys Swimming	Winter	4A/3A/2A/1A-SD1 Special District 1
Girls Swimming	Winter	4A/3A/2A/1A-SD1 Special District 1
Boys Wrestling	Winter	4A-SD4 Special District 4
Girls Wrestling	Winter	4A/3A/2A/1A-SD3 Special District 3
Cheerleading	Winter	6A/5A/4A/3A/2A/1A-CMB Combined
Boys Track & Field	Spring	4A-2 Tri-Valley Conference
Girls Track & Field	Spring	4A-2 Tri-Valley Conference
Baseball	Spring	4A-2 Tri-Valley Conference
Softball	Spring	4A-2 Tri-Valley Conference
Boys Golf	Spring	4A-SD1 Special District 1
Girls Golf	Spring	4A/3A/2A/1A-SD1 Special District 1
Boys Tennis	Spring	4A/3A/2A/1A-SD4 Special District 4
Girls Tennis	Spring	4A/3A/2A/1A-SD4 Special District 4

=== State championships ===
- Football: 1923, 1947

== Notable alumni ==
- John Callahan, Cartoonist
- H.L Davis, Novelist, Poet, and Pulitzer Prize winner.
- Greg Walden, Congressman
- John H. Dick, Basketball Player and Rear Admiral in the U.S. Navy.
- Shemia Fagan, State Senator and Secretary of State of Oregon.

James Atoe, Former professional and college football player who notably played for the University of Washington.

== See also ==
- Pulpit Rock (The Dalles, Oregon)
