= Hood River, Oregon =

City in Oregon, U.S.

- City
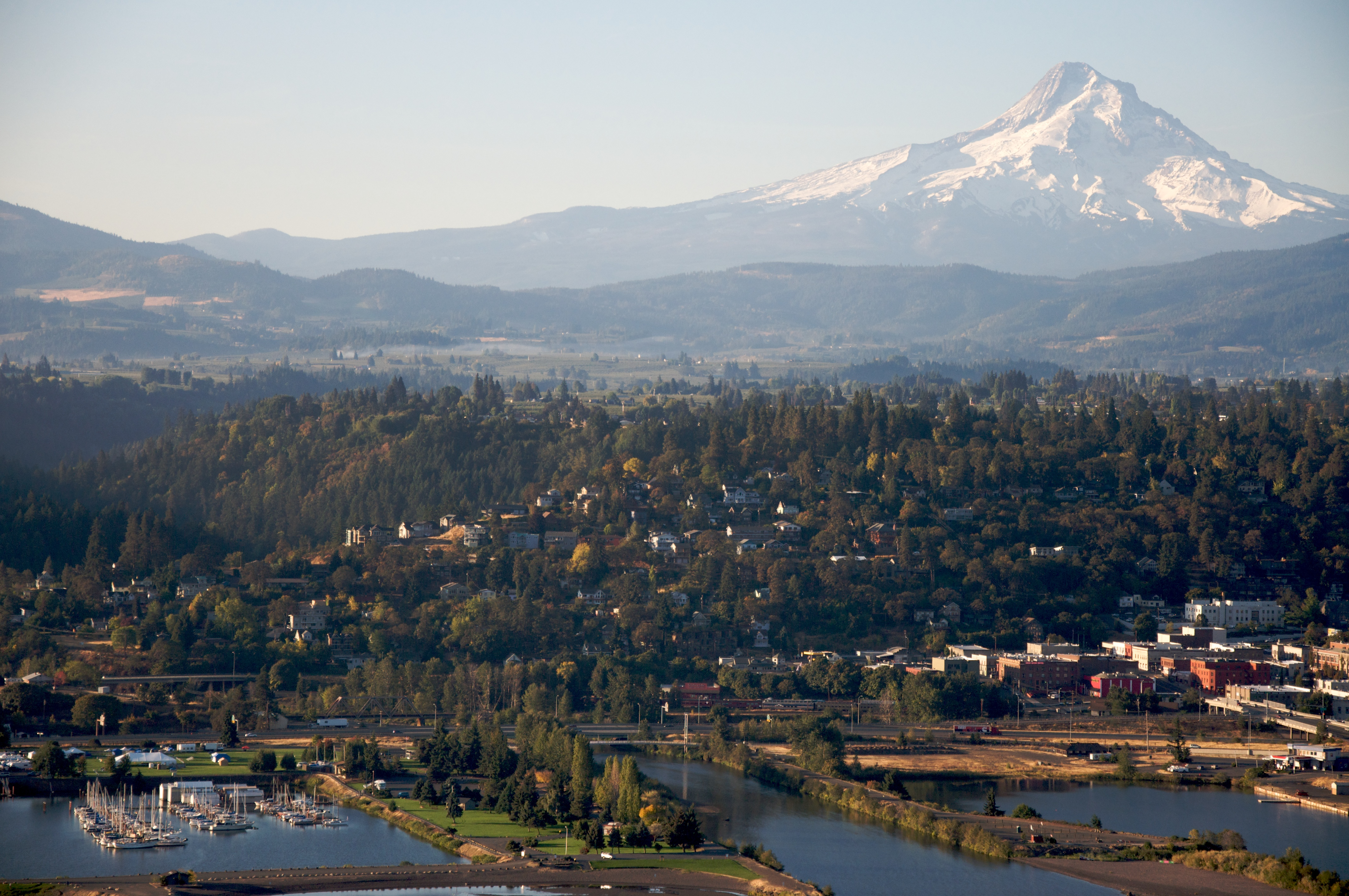
- Aerial photo of the city of Hood River

- Seal
- Nickname: Windsurfing Capital of the World
- Location in Oregon

- Location in the United States
- Coordinates: 45°42′34″N 121°31′18″W
- Country: United States
- State: Oregon
- County: Hood River
- Incorporated: 1895

Government
  - Mayor: Paul Blackburn

Area
  - Total: 3.40 sq mi (8.80 km^{2})
  - Land: 2.59 sq mi (6.72 km^{2})
  - Water: 0.80 sq mi (2.07 km^{2})
- Elevation: 279 ft (85 m)

Population (2020)
  - Total: 8,313
  - Density: 3,201.6/sq mi (1,236.16/km^{2})
- Time zone: UTC−8 (Pacific)
  - Summer (DST): UTC−7 (Pacific)
- ZIP code: 97031
- Area codes: 458 and 541
- FIPS code: 41-34900
- GNIS feature ID: 2410787
- Website: www.cityofhoodriver.gov/

Hood River is a city in and the county seat of Hood River County, Oregon, United States. It is a port on the Columbia River, and is named for the nearby Hood River. As of the 2020 census, the city population was 8,313. It is the only city in Oregon where public consumption of alcohol on sidewalks or parks is completely unrestricted.

== History ==
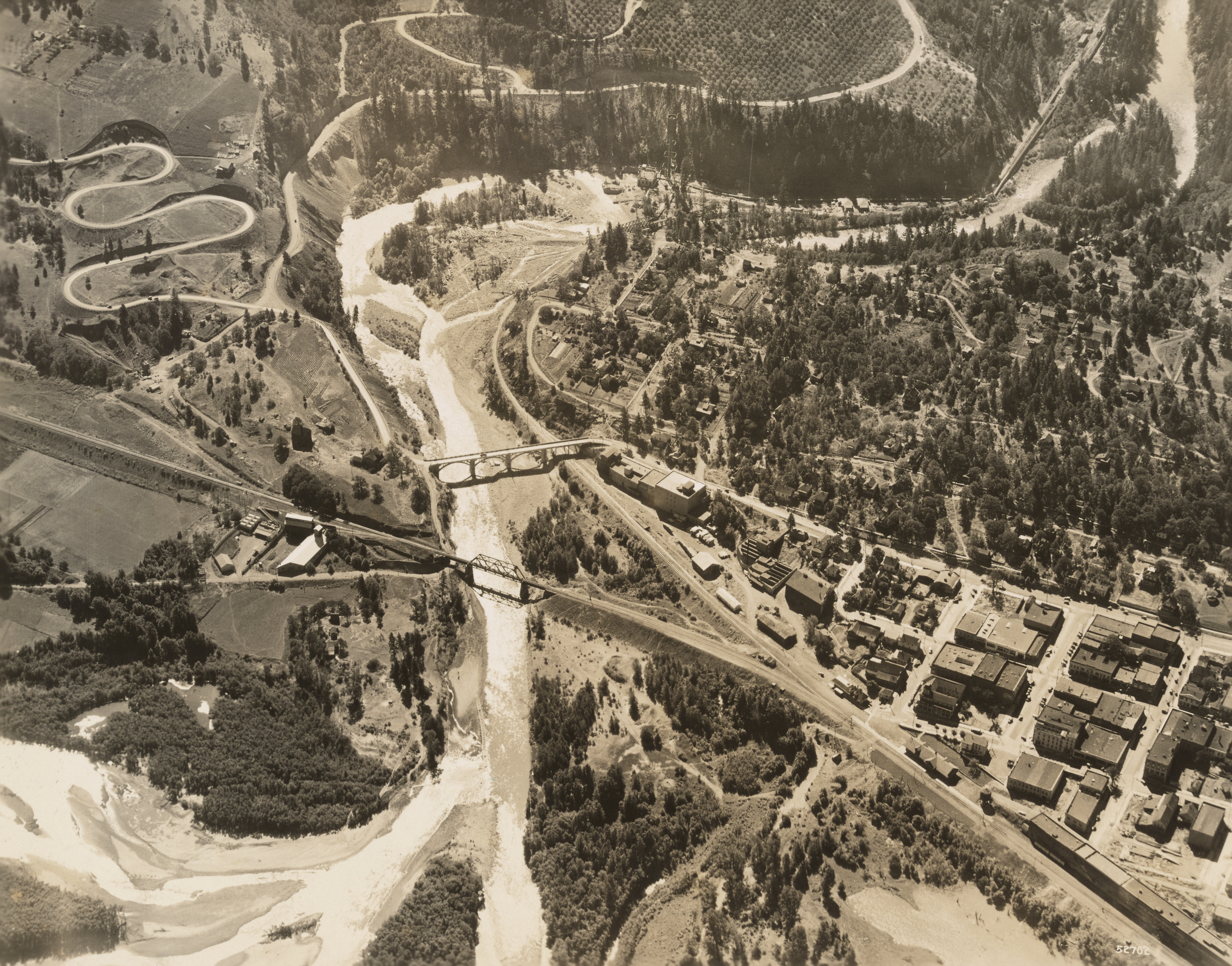
Looking down on the town of Hood River showing the Columbia Highway winding up the east bank of Hood River, 1923

Hood River (originally called Dog River) post office was established (named by Mary Coe, who founded the city with her husband Nathaniel Coe) at the site of the present city on September 30, 1868, and the city itself was incorporated in 1895. Originally, the city was part of Wasco County, but it became the seat of Hood River County when the county was first established in 1908.

=== Hood River Incident ===
The Hood River incident involved the removal of 16 Nisei servicemen's names from the county "roll of honor" in Hood River, Oregon, by the local American Legion Post 22. The incident, on November 29, 1944, was part of a string of anti-Japanese actions taken in an attempt to prevent removed Japanese Americans from returning to the area after their release from internment by the United States federal government. National outrage against the community heightened five weeks later when a local Japanese American serviceman died after completing a heroic mission in the Philippines. Under great pressure, the local American Legion post restored Nisei names to the wall of the county courthouse on April 29, 1945.

== Geography ==
Hood River is at the confluence of the Hood River and the Columbia River in the heart of the Columbia River Gorge. The city is about 30 miles (48 km) north of Mount Hood, the tallest peak in the state. It is across the Columbia River from White Salmon, Washington. South of the city is the Hood River Valley, known for its production of apples, pears, and cherries.

According to the United States Census Bureau, the city has a total area of 3.35 square miles (8.68 km^{2}), of which 2.55 square miles (6.60 km^{2}) is land and 0.80 square miles (2.07 km^{2}) is water.

=== Climate ===
Located at the transition zone between wet temperate rainforest to the west, and dry shrub-steppe desert to the east, Hood River has a moderate climate with rainy winters and warm summers (Köppen: Csb), although rainfall is somewhat less than Portland and other nearby areas in the Willamette Valley. Hood River averages around 30 inches (760 mm) of precipitation a year, while Cascade Locks, 20 miles (32 km) west, receives over 75 inches (1,900 mm), and The Dalles, 20 miles (32 km) east, less than 15 inches (380 mm). Actual precipitation has ranged from 11.73 inches or 297.9 millimeters in the "rain year" from July 1976 to June 1977, up to 48.63 inches or 1,235.2 millimeters between July 1915 and June 1916, while the most in one month has been 15.64 inches (397.3 mm) in December 1996. Snowfall is moderate but heavier than west of the Cascades: the most in one season is 99.8 inches or 2.5 meters between July 1979 and June 1980, of which 84.5 inches or 2.1 meters fell in the record snowy January 1980. In contrast, no measurable snow fell between July 2002 and June 2003, and between July 2024 and June 2025.

The area is known for its consistently high winds channeling down the Columbia River Gorge.

Temperatures for the year as a whole are slightly cooler than in most other low-elevation towns in the region, especially at night because of air drainage off the surrounding mountains. On average, 21 afternoons reach 90 °F or 32.2 °C, two afternoons reach or exceed 100 °F or 37.8 °C, seven afternoons do not top freezing, and 79 mornings fall below freezing. The lowest temperature recorded in Hood River was −12 °F (−24.4 °C) on January 28 and 29, 1957, and the lowest maximum 0 °F (−17.8 °C) on December 31, 1968, whilst the hottest has been 111 °F (43.9 °C) on June 29, 2021.

Climate data for Hood River, Oregon (1991–2020 normals, extremes 1893–present)
Month	Jan	Feb	Mar	Apr	May	Jun	Jul	Aug	Sep	Oct	Nov	Dec	Year
Record high °F (°C)	65 (18)	69 (21)	81 (27)	91 (33)	102 (39)	111 (44)	107 (42)	108 (42)	101 (38)	89 (32)	73 (23)	68 (20)	111 (44)
Mean maximum °F (°C)	55.6 (13.1)	58.4 (14.7)	68.0 (20.0)	78.3 (25.7)	87.4 (30.8)	93.4 (34.1)	99.0 (37.2)	98.9 (37.2)	92.3 (33.5)	78.0 (25.6)	63.4 (17.4)	54.3 (12.4)	101.1 (38.4)
Mean daily maximum °F (°C)	40.8 (4.9)	46.2 (7.9)	53.3 (11.8)	60.0 (15.6)	68.4 (20.2)	73.6 (23.1)	81.7 (27.6)	82.4 (28.0)	75.9 (24.4)	62.8 (17.1)	48.6 (9.2)	40.2 (4.6)	61.2 (16.2)
Daily mean °F (°C)	35.6 (2.0)	38.7 (3.7)	43.9 (6.6)	49.6 (9.8)	57.0 (13.9)	62.3 (16.8)	68.6 (20.3)	68.5 (20.3)	61.6 (16.4)	50.9 (10.5)	41.4 (5.2)	35.4 (1.9)	51.1 (10.6)
Mean daily minimum °F (°C)	30.4 (−0.9)	31.2 (−0.4)	34.5 (1.4)	39.2 (4.0)	45.6 (7.6)	51.1 (10.6)	55.5 (13.1)	54.7 (12.6)	47.3 (8.5)	39.1 (3.9)	34.3 (1.3)	30.6 (−0.8)	41.1 (5.1)
Mean minimum °F (°C)	17.2 (−8.2)	19.3 (−7.1)	24.8 (−4.0)	29.6 (−1.3)	33.9 (1.1)	40.2 (4.6)	45.5 (7.5)	43.3 (6.3)	35.8 (2.1)	26.2 (−3.2)	21.4 (−5.9)	19.6 (−6.9)	10.8 (−11.8)
Record low °F (°C)	−12 (−24)	−10 (−23)	9 (−13)	22 (−6)	26 (−3)	32 (0)	35 (2)	35 (2)	24 (−4)	15 (−9)	−5 (−21)	−6 (−21)	−12 (−24)
Average precipitation inches (mm)	5.23 (133)	3.51 (89)	3.18 (81)	1.84 (47)	1.32 (34)	0.82 (21)	0.24 (6.1)	0.24 (6.1)	0.71 (18)	2.64 (67)	4.83 (123)	5.86 (149)	30.42 (773)
Average snowfall inches (cm)	6.9 (18)	2.5 (6.4)	0.7 (1.8)	0.0 (0.0)	0.0 (0.0)	0.0 (0.0)	0.0 (0.0)	0.0 (0.0)	0.0 (0.0)	0.1 (0.25)	1.5 (3.8)	5.5 (14)	17.2 (44)
Average precipitation days (≥ 0.01 in)	18.6	15.0	15.3	12.9	8.7	5.5	1.5	1.9	3.9	11.2	17.9	19.2	131.6
Average snowy days (≥ 0.1 in)	3.3	1.4	0.3	0.0	0.0	0.0	0.0	0.0	0.0	0.0	1.0	3.6	9.6
Average ultraviolet index	1	1	2	3	4	5	6	4	3	3	1	2	3
Source 1: NOAA
Source 2: Weather Atlas (UV and humidity)

== Demographics ==
Historical population
Census	Pop.	Note	%±
1880	200		—
1890	201		0.5%
1900	766		281.1%
1910	2,331		204.3%
1920	3,195		37.1%
1930	2,757		−13.7%
1940	3,280		19.0%
1950	3,701		12.8%
1960	3,657		−1.2%
1970	3,991		9.1%
1980	4,329		8.5%
1990	4,632		7.0%
2000	5,831		25.9%
2010	7,167		22.9%
2020	8,313		16.0%

=== 2020 census ===
As of the 2020 census, Hood River had a population of 8,313 people, 3,432 households, and 1,833 families. The population density was 3,197.3 per square mile (1,234.5/km^{2}). There were 3,921 housing units at an average density of 1,513.1 units per square mile (584.2 units/km^{2}).

The median age was 38.2 years, with 24.5% of residents under the age of 18 and 15.7% aged 65 years or older. For every 100 females there were 91.8 males, and for every 100 females age 18 and over there were 88.2 males.

Of the 3,432 households, 33.4% had children under the age of 18 living with them, 41.7% were married-couple households, 18.8% were households with a male householder and no spouse or partner present, and 31.6% were households with a female householder and no spouse or partner present. About 31.3% of all households were made up of individuals and 14.0% had someone living alone who was 65 years of age or older. The average household size was 2.2 and the average family size was 3.0.

There were 3,921 housing units, of which 12.5% were vacant. Among occupied housing units, 53.4% were owner-occupied and 46.6% were renter-occupied. The homeowner vacancy rate was 0.8% and the rental vacancy rate was 6.3%.

100.0% of residents lived in urban areas, while <0.1% lived in rural areas.

Racial composition as of the 2020 census
Race	Number	Percent
White	6,086	73.2%
Black or African American	30	0.4%
American Indian and Alaska Native	75	0.9%
Asian	194	2.3%
Native Hawaiian and Other Pacific Islander	9	0.1%
Some other race	760	9.1%
Two or more races	1,159	13.9%
Hispanic or Latino (of any race)	1,951	23.5%

The 2016–2020 5-year American Community Survey estimates show that the median household income was $65,567 (with a margin of error of +/- $12,299) and the median family income $100,764 (+/- $32,078). Males had a median income of $37,428 (+/- $6,330) versus $37,586 (+/- $8,180) for females. The median income for those above 16 years old was $37,489 (+/- $3,712). Approximately, 2.0% of families and 5.7% of the population were below the poverty line, including 1.8% of those under the age of 18 and 11.0% of those ages 65 or over.

=== 2010 census ===
As of the census of 2010, there were 7,167 people, 2,972 households, and 1,728 families residing in the city. The population density was 2,810.6 inhabitants per square mile (1,085.2/km^{2}). There were 3,473 housing units at an average density of 1,362.0 units per square mile (525.9 units/km^{2}). The racial makeup of the city was:

- 86.9% White
- 24.4% Hispanic or Latino,
- 0.5% African American,
- 0.6% Native American,
- 1.5% Asian, 0.1% Pacific Islander,
- 7.4% from other races, and
- 3.0% from two or more races.

There were 2,972 households, of which 33.8% had children under the age of 18 living with them, 43.2% were married couples living together, 11.0% had a female householder with no husband present, 4.0% had a male householder with no wife present, and 41.9% were non-families. 33.4% of all households were made up of individuals, and 13.8% had someone living alone who was 65 years of age or older. The average household size was 2.39 and the average family size was 3.12.

The median age in the city was 36.3 years. 25.9% of residents were under the age of 18; 7.3% were between the ages of 18 and 24; 30.6% were from 25 to 44; 23.5% were from 45 to 64; and 12.7% were 65 years of age or older. The gender makeup of the city was 47.9% male and 52.1% female.

=== 2000 census ===
As of the census of 2000, there were 5,831 people, 2,429 households, and 1,442 families residing in the city. The population density was 2,839.4 people per square mile (1,096.3 people/km^{2}). There were 2,645 housing units at an average density of 1,288.0 units per square mile (497.3 units/km^{2}). The racial makeup of the city was:

- 57.66% White
- 23.17% Hispanic or Latino
- 1.15% Asian
- 0.99% Native American
- 0.60% African American
- 0.19% Pacific Islander
- 13.58% from other races
- 2.66% from two or more races.

There were 2,429 households, of which 32.3% had children under the age of 18 living with them, 44.1% were married couples living together, 11.6% had a female householder with no husband present, and 40.6% were non-families. 32.8% of all households were made up of individuals, and 14.8% had someone living alone who was 65 years of age or older. The average household size was 2.38 and the average family size was 3.06.

In the city, the population was spread out, with:

- 26.2% under the age of 18
- 9.7% from 18 to 24
- 32.6% from 25 to 44
- 18.5% from 45 to 64
- 13.1% 65 years of age or older.

The median age was 34 years. For every 100 females, there were 88.6 males. For every 100 females age 18 and over, there were 87.7 males.

The median income for a household in the city was $31,580, and the median income for a family was $35,568. Males had a median income of $31,583 versus $24,764 for females. The per capita income for the city was $17,609. About 12.1% of families and 17.3% of the population were below the poverty line including 28.7% of those under age 18 and 14.3% of those age 65 or over.

== Economy ==
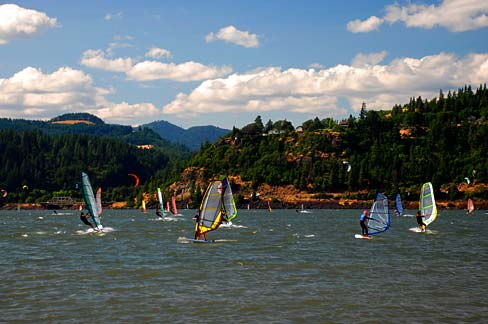
Windsurfers on the Columbia River

Hood River's economy has traditionally been based on three industries: agriculture, tourism, and sports recreation, but since the late 1990s, high-tech industries, such as aerospace engineering (e.g. Insitu and Hood Technologies), have become some of the largest employers. Long an agricultural center of the Pacific Northwest, Hood River historically was a hub of logging exports and fruit tree orchards. While lumber was the primary export for Hood River throughout most of its history, with the advent of forest protection measures such as the establishment of the Columbia River Gorge National Scenic Area, Hood River has exchanged most of its former tree cutting agricultural ways to focus more heavily on its apple and pear orchards as well as many wineries. Many of these local orchards and wineries, including Hood River-based The Fruit Company, are featured on Hood River's renowned "Fruit Loop".

Hood River first experienced a boom in tourism after being discovered as a site for windsurfing, and more recently kiteboarding. Hood River County also has some of the best kayaking, mountain biking, downhill and Nordic skiing, and hiking areas in the United States.

Situated in the Columbia Gorge, and surrounded by fields, orchards, vineyards, and at the foot of Mount Hood, Hood River is a popular tourist destination.

All of these factors have led to coverage and acclaim in publications such as National Geographic Adventure, Sunset, Outside, Backpacker, Smithsonian, the New York Times travel section, and others. Hood River has received numerous awards from national magazines, such as "coolest small town" to "fifth best ski-town in America". Most recently, Hood River was featured on CNN as one of "11 great riverfront towns" in the United States.

Other industries in the city include Hood River Distillers, Full Sail Brewing Company, and vegetarian food manufacturer Turtle Island Foods, producer of Tofurky. The Hood River Valley is also home to more than a dozen wineries.

== Arts and culture ==
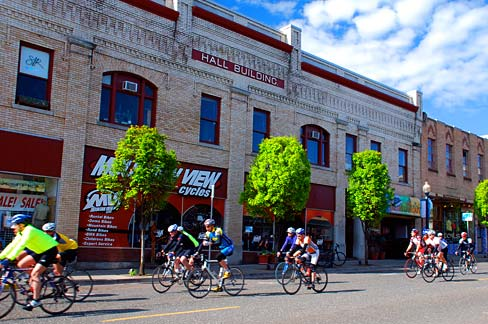
Bicyclists in downtown Hood River

Hood River has become home to a notable concentration of visual and performing artists, writers, design professionals, business creatives, and culinary establishments. On 2018, Hood River was listed as the number four small city in the "Arts Vibrancy Index", released by the National Center for Arts Research at Southern Methodist University.

Among the arts organizations in the city is the Performing Arts Initiative, a non-profit group founded in 2016 with the goal of building a performing arts center in the Columbia River Gorge. The group's chair, Mark Steighner, was the musical director of Hood River Valley High School before retiring to head the PAI.

Also based in Hood River is the Columbia Gorge Orchestra Association (CGOA), a non-profit organization that includes six ensembles. The CGOA initially consisted solely of the Mid-Columbia Sinfonietta, which began performing in 1977 in conjunction with the Chamber Music Society of Oregon. The association was formed in 2004, adding two choirs, a jazz collective, a string quartet, and a theater group throughout the next ten years.

A small city with good walkability, Hood River is home to a public art walking tour and six diverse art galleries all within the small 'downtown' area. BIG ART, the public art walking tour hosted by Art of Community (established in 2014), periodically rotates sculptures and other outdoor art installations throughout the town.

=== Annual events ===
Annual cultural events in the Hood River Valley include Hood River Valley Blossom Time and the Hood River Hard-Pressed Cider Fest, which take place in April, as well as the Hood River Hops Fest and the Hood River Valley Harvest Fest, both in October. In 2012, FoodandWine.com identified the Harvest Fest as one of the best harvest festivals in the United States.

The oldest swimming event on the Columbia River, the Roy Webster Cross-Channel Swim, takes place in Hood River every Labor Day. The event has been held nearly continuously since 1942, with the first cancellation occurring in 2017 due to the Eagle Creek Fire. The U.S. Windsurfing National Championships were held in Hood River in 2001, 2009, and 2012, and the Mount Hood Cycling Classic was held in the city from 2002 to 2013.

=== Museums and other points of interest ===
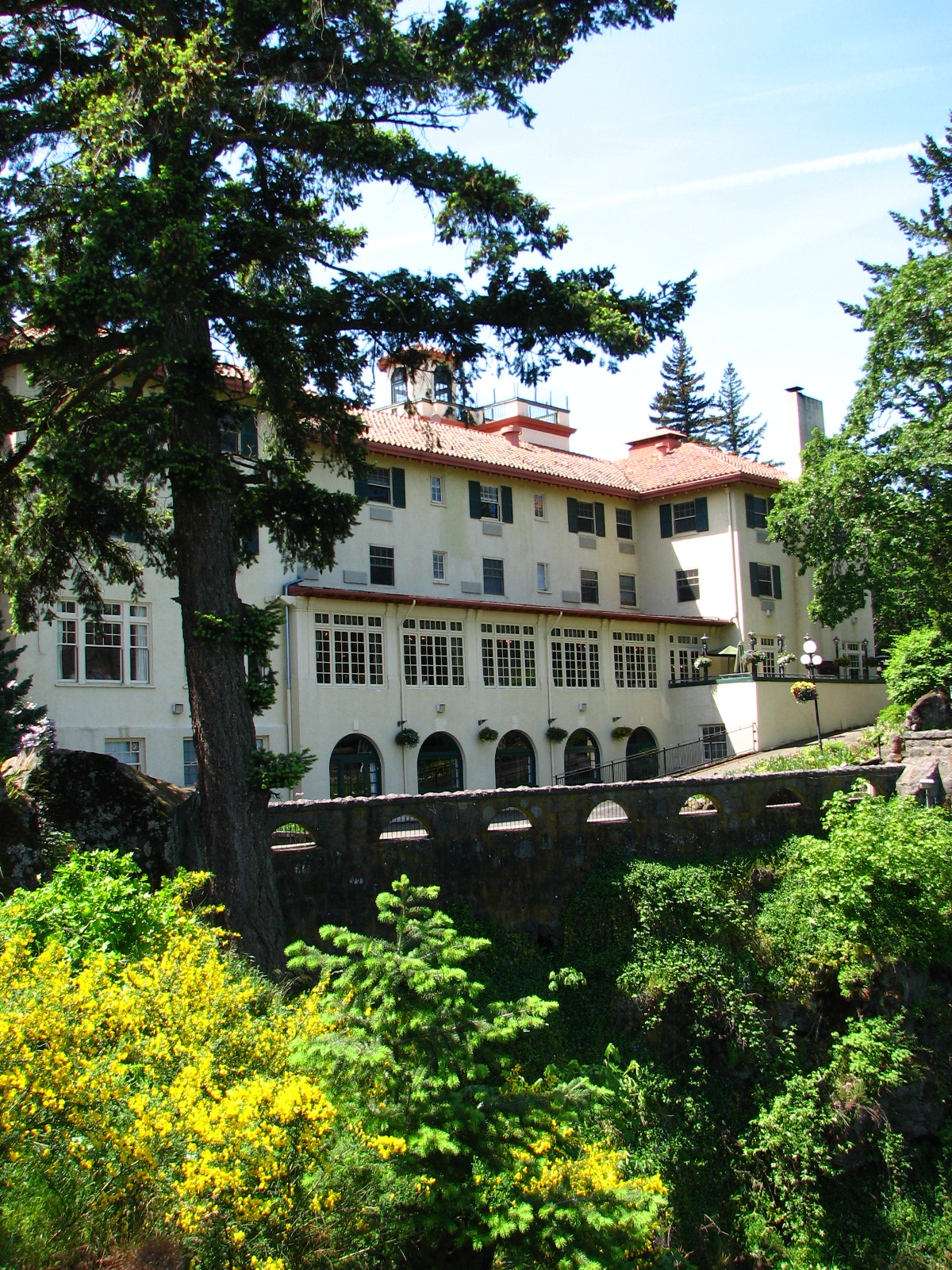
The Columbia Gorge Hotel, listed on the National Register of Historic Places

Hood River is home to the History Museum of Hood River County and the Western Antique Aeroplane & Automobile Museum; the International Museum of Carousel Art was also housed in the city until its closure in 2010. The city has over two dozen sites listed on the National Register of Historic Places (due in large part to the work of Sally Donovan, a local historian), including the Columbia Gorge Hotel, built in 1920 by Portland timber baron and Columbia Gorge booster Simon Benson.

The oldest house in the city is the Ezra L. Smith home, which he built in 1886 for his family. Smith was influential in state politics, in Oregon agricultural development, in Hood River city administration, and in banking. The house later served as a mortuary for over 40 years and is now the site of wine production and tastings for Stoltz Vineyards.

== Parks and recreation ==
Hood River is the western gateway to the Mount Hood Scenic Byway and to a major section of the Historic Columbia River Highway. Hood River is considered a "sports mecca" and offers some of the best spots for windsurfing, kitesurfing, kayaking, standup paddleboarding, skiing and mountain biking—all for which it draws considerable national attention from many media outlets, such as the New York Times and National Geographic Adventure. The Port Commission has built a protected harbor for learning windsurfing called "The Hook". The city also features the family- and wind-sport–friendly Waterfront Park, a public pool, a skate park, biking trails, and several small public parks and ball fields. The valley is also home to two 18-hole golf courses. Further, the nation's oldest volunteer search and rescue crew serving a mountain area, the Crag Rats, has its base in Hood River.

== Education ==
Public primary and secondary schools in Hood River are part of the Hood River County School District. Representing the change in town culture is the new garden, greenhouse and zero-energy music and science building at Hood River Middle School as part of the new Outdoor Classroom Project. The city is also served by an extension campus of Columbia Gorge Community College, based in The Dalles. Horizon Christian School is a private school serving grades kindergarten through twelfth grade (K–12). Horizon competes at the 3A level of the Oregon School Activities Association, while the public Hood River Valley High School competes at the 5A level. The city also is home to the Mid-Columbia Adventist School.

In 2017, theatre educator Rachel Harry received the Excellence in Theatre Education Award, presented at the 71st Tony Awards ceremony. She was an honorable mention for this award the year prior. The award recognizes the integrity and excellence of the theatre program Harry has built since 1986 at the Hood River Valley High School and of her wider work throughout the community.

== Media ==
=== Newspapers ===
The Columbia Gorge News is a weekly paper published on Wednesdays and serving Hood River, The Dalles, and White Salmon, Washington.

=== Radio ===
- KIHR AM 1340/98.3 FM
- KODL AM 1440/99.1 FM
- KQAC FM 88.1
- KMSW FM 92.7/102.9
- KOPB-FM FM 94.3
- KZAS-LP FM 95.1 Radio Tierra
- KACI-FM 93.5
- KCGB-FM 105.5/96.9

=== Television ===
- K34KE-D translator for KGW Portland, NBC affiliate
- K23OV-D translator for KOIN Portland, CBS affiliate
- CGN-7 Gorge TV

=== Magazines ===
Two locally published magazines serve the area. Columbia Gorge Magazine and The Gorge Magazine are monthly magazines featuring recreation, dining, shopping, weddings, architecture, arts and entertainment taking place in the Columbia Gorge area (primarily Hood River, The Dalles, and Troutdale).

== Infrastructure ==
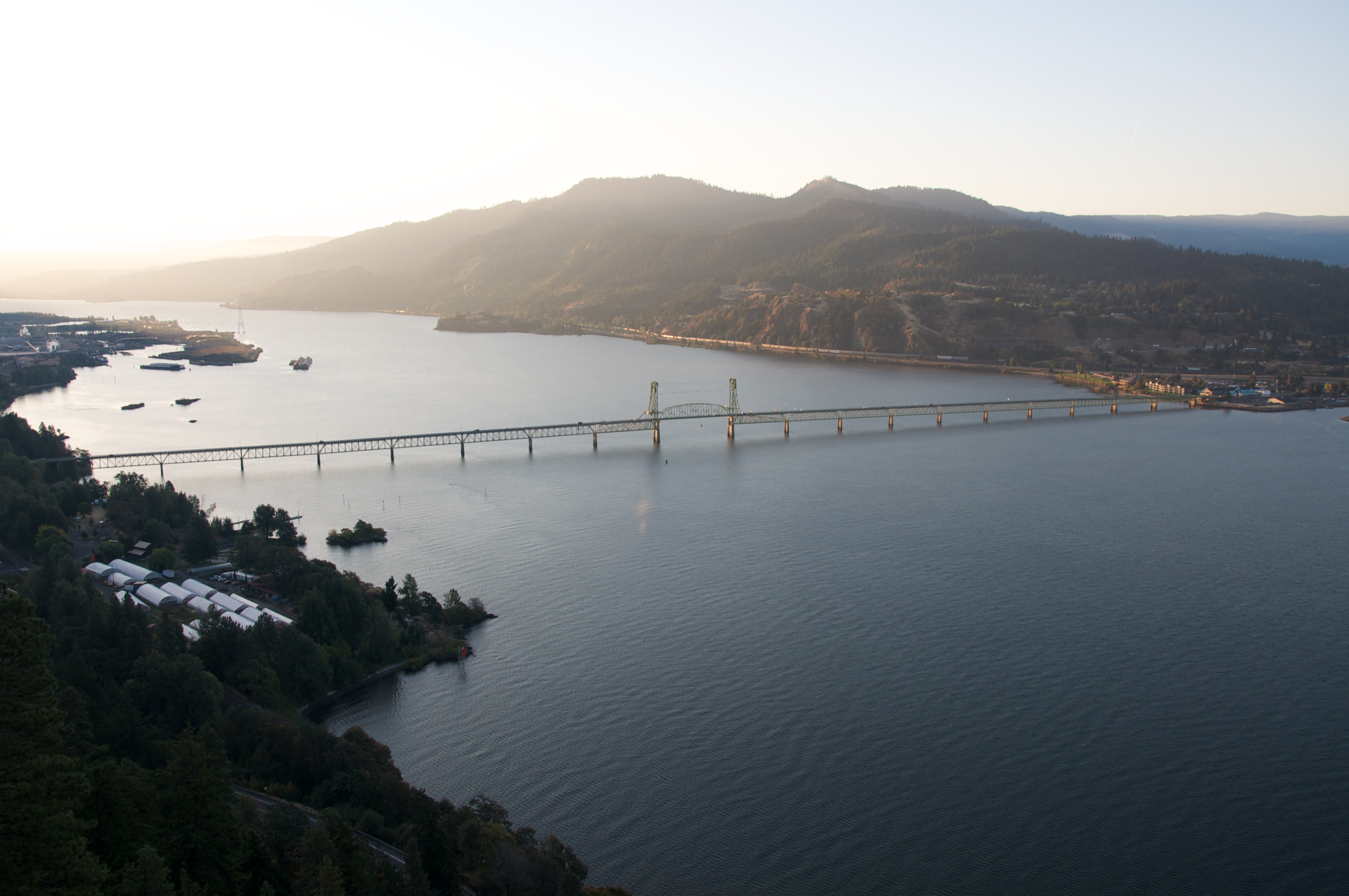
Hood River Bridge

=== Transportation ===
Air

Hood River has one airport, the Ken Jernstedt Airfield. It has no scheduled airline service and is for light general aviation use. However, Portland International Airport is a one-hour drive west from Hood River.

Highway

Interstate 84 and Oregon Route 35 pass through Hood River.

Rail

Hood River is the northern terminus of the Mount Hood Railroad, a heritage railway that offers passenger excursions from Hood River station and ships a small amount of freight. Union Pacific Railroad provides freight service to the city. The Union Pacific Railroad also had passenger service to Hood River for much of the 20th century, while Amtrak's Pioneer also served the city from 1977 to 1997 at Hood River station.

Bus

Hood River receives national bus service from Greyhound Lines. Additional bus service is provided to Portland, the Dalles, and Bingen by Columbia Area Transit and Mount Adams Transportation Service.

Marine

The Port of Hood River, founded in 1933, manages a public marina and waterfront economic development projects. The port commission also manages the airport and the Hood River-White Salmon Interstate Bridge.

=== Utilities ===
Water and wastewater treatment are supplied by the City of Hood River. Natural gas is provided by NW Natural and electricity by PacifiCorp.

=== Healthcare ===
Hood River has one hospital, Providence Hood River Memorial Hospital.

== Notable people ==
- Cecil D. Andrus, politician, governor of Idaho
- Andrew Baldwin, professional baseball player
- Timothy K. Beal, religious scholar, author, professor
- Sammy Carlson, freeskier, X-Games medalist
- D. J. Conway, fantasy author
- Thomas R. Coon, strawberry farmer and politician
- Sean FitzSimons, a participant in the 2022 winter games.
- Flor, alternative rock band signed to Fueled By Ramen
- Peter Foley (born 1965 or 1966), former snowboarding coach; suspended for 10 years for sexual misconduct
- Edward Hill, painter, poet, songwriter, newspaper correspondent
- George Hitchcock (1914–2010), poet, publisher
- Kenneth Jernstedt, fighter pilot in the Flying Tigers and politician
- Damon Knight, science fiction author
- Jeff Lahti, professional baseball player
- Marc Lee, United States Navy SEAL, first SEAL killed in the Global War on Terror
- Kim Peyton, swimmer, gold medalist at 1976 Olympic Games
- Marcus W. Robertson, war hero and Medal of Honor recipient
- Bob Smith, professional baseball player from 1957 to 1965
- Brooke Struck, television personality
- Bronwen Thomas, Olympic mogul skier
- Suzanne VanOrman, politician
- Don Wakamatsu, professional baseball player and manager
- Greg Walden, politician
- Simeon R. Wilson, politician
- Minoru Yasui, lawyer, civil rights activist, Presidential Medal of Freedom recipient

== Sister cities ==
Hood River has one sister city, as designated by Sister Cities International:

- Tsuruta, Japan

== See also ==
- List of cities in Oregon
