= Wilma Roberts =

- Born: February 11, 1914; The Dalles
- Died: 22 August 2014 (aged 100); The Dalles

Wilma Roberts or Wilma Louise McCarty (1914 – 2014) was an American photographer.

Roberts was born in The Dalles, Oregon and learned photography from her mother Laura Spencer McCarty, who photographed the lifestyle of the Native Americans who lived around Butter Creek in the 1900s. She is mostly known for her hand colored black and white photographs for Everett Olmstead's Elite Studio in The Dalles where she later worked for 35 years starting in 1939. She also set up a camera shop there for Olmstead's son "Mel O" in the late 1940s, and later produced a photography book based on a selection of her 1940s and 1950s photographs of the Celilo falls during the salmon fishing season before the US Army Corps of Engineers later built the dam that made this impossible in 1957. The seasonal photographs became popular prints when the Union Pacific Railroad made this scene into a tourist attraction. Her photographs were recognized by the Photographic Society of America for which she became a judge herself and who made her a fellow in 1987.

Roberts died in The Dalles.
