= Thomas R. Coon =

American politician

Thomas Ray Coon (March 4, 1854 - February 8, 1937) was a teacher and farmer from Hood River, Oregon who served two terms (1893-1896) as a Republican member of the Oregon House of Representatives from the 47th district (Sherman and Wasco counties), as well as serving as mayor of Hood River. He was a grandson of Paul Crandall, who had served in the Wisconsin State Assembly before migrating to Oregon.
