= Hood River Valley High School =

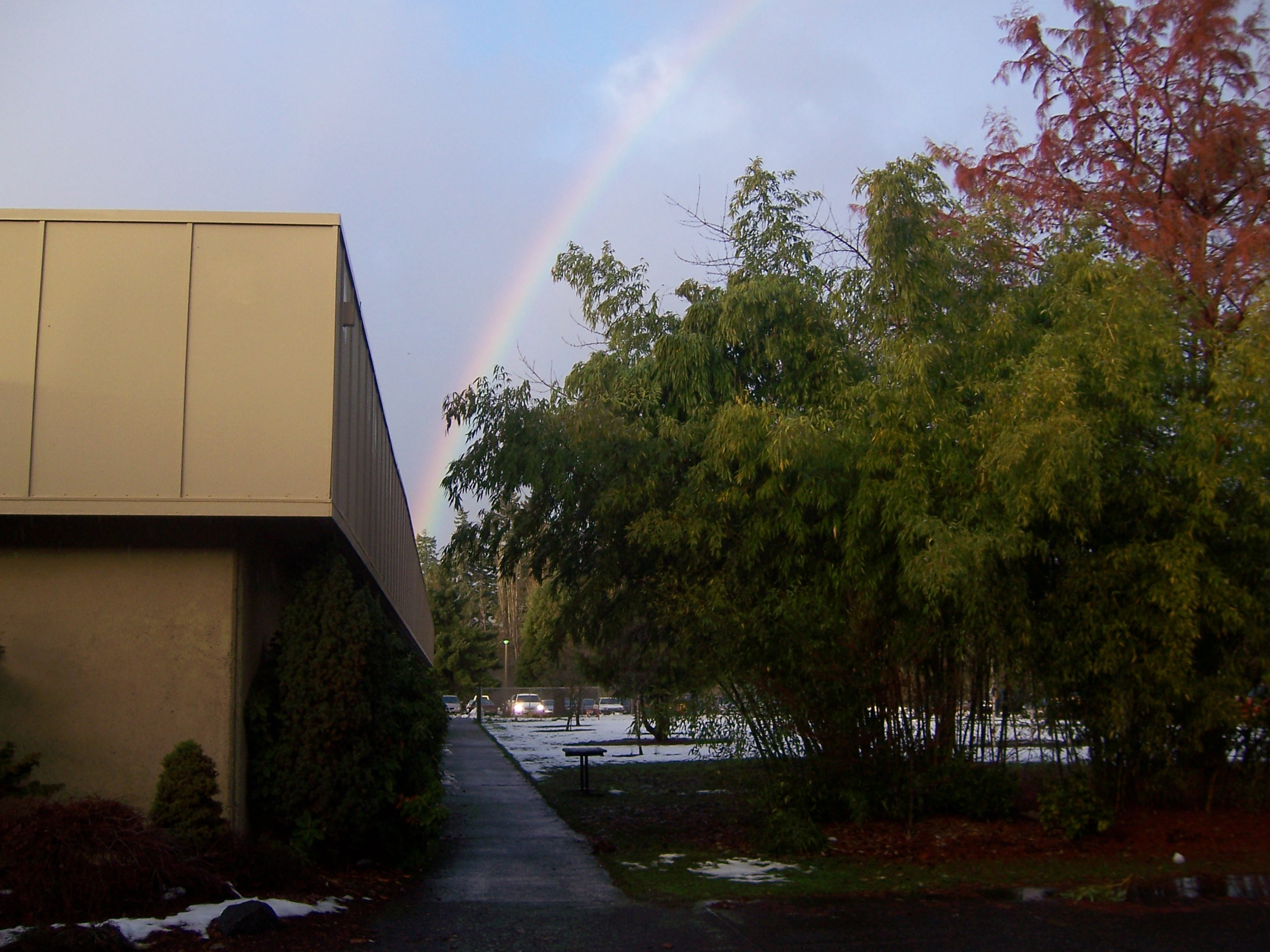

Location
- 1220 Indian Creek Road; Hood River, Oregon 97031; United States; 45.68471°N 121.545879°W

Information
- Type: Public
- School district: Hood River County School District
- Principal: Jim Donnelly
- Teaching staff: 63.11 (FTE)
- Grades: 9-12
- Enrollment: 1,160 (2023-2024)
- Student to teacher ratio: 18.38
- Colors: Navy, Gold, and White
- Athletics conference: OSAA 5A-1 Northwest Conference
- Mascot: Eagle
- Team name: Eagles
- Rival: The Dalles High School Parkrose High School
- Newspaper: The Talon
- Website: School's website

Hood River Valley High School is a public high school in Hood River, Oregon, United States.

== Academics ==
Hood River Valley High School is a Title 1 school.

The school has a dropout rate of 2.8% and an attendance rate of 94%. Of the 38% of students who took the SAT, the average verbal score was 504 and the average math score was 507.

In the 2006 Oregon Statewide Assessments, the score for reading was 57%, the state average being 55%. For science, the score was 50%, below the state average of 62%. In writing the score was 55%, equal to the state average of 55%. The score for math was 38%, and the state average was 45%.

In 2008, 76% of the school's seniors received a high school diploma. Of 314 students, 238 graduated, 53 dropped out, five received a modified diploma, and 18 were still in high school in 2009.

Hood River Valley High School offers eight Advanced Placement (AP) courses and 27 additional opportunities for college credit through Columbia Gorge Community College, Eastern Oregon University, and Mount Hood Community College.

== Athletics ==
Hood River Valley athletic teams compete in the OSAA 5A-1 Northwest Oregon Conference.

State championships:

- Baseball: 1980, 1986, 1988, 1990, 2015
- Boys Soccer: 2014, 2015
- Boys Track and Field: 2016
- Cheerleading: 1992
- Choir: 1991, 1992, 1993
- Football: 1989
- Girls Tennis: 1962
- Girls Cross Country: 1992, 2018
- Softball: 1996
- Speech: 2020, 2021
- Girls Wrestling: 2019
- Girls Water Polo: 2016, 2017, 2019, 2022, 2023

== Notable alumni ==
- Andrew Baldwin, Class of 2001, baseball player, Tacoma Rainiers
- Dylan Bauld, Class of 2009; Zach Grace and McKinley Kitts, Class of 2010, of the Los Angeles-based indie pop band Flor
- Travis Bowe, Class of 1999 - writer, producer and voice-over actor, Family Guy, The Cleveland Show, Tosh.0
- Jeff Lahti, Class of 1974, St. Louis Cardinals pitcher; orchardist in Hood River, Oregon
