= The Fruit Company =

- Company type: Private
- Industry: Consumer Goods
- Founded: 1942
- Headquarters: Hood River, Oregon, US
- Key people: Scott Webster, CEO
- Products: Fresh fruit, fruit baskets, gift boxes, fruit club subscriptions
- Number of employees: 43
- Website: thefruitcompany.com

The Fruit Company is an American company that was founded in 1942 by Roy Webster. The company, still privately owned and led by CEO Scott Webster, has become known for its "classic baskets and gift towers featuring Northwest-grown pears and apples." The company also provides support to college students through "The Roy Webster Scholarship" and "The Fruit Company Gift Basket Entrepreneur Award."

== History ==
Roy Webster, who had once toured the Hood River Valley on honeymoon, came to the area in 1942 and acquired 600 acres (240 ha) of land. The company, then named Webster Orchards, originally specialized in Comice pears and, in the following years, began running a mail order service to distribute its products across the Pacific Northwest.

The company eventually passed to Roy Webster's son, Wayne Webster, who then passed the company to sons Scott and Addison Webster in 1999. Under the management of the Webster brothers, Webster Orchards became The Fruit Company and began selling fruit under "The World's Finest Fruit" trademark. In 1986, the Webster brothers purchased the Diamond Fruit packing warehouse to establish the Fruit Company's permanent headquarters. Scott Webster is currently the company's CEO, and President of Roy Webster Orchards Incorporated.

During the Great Recession, the fruit basket supplier laid off thirty percent of its employees; it began outsourcing its merchandising work. During this period, big box retailer Costco became a customer.

The Fruit Company is also a part of Hood River County's famous "Fruit Loop", a driving tour that stops at family farms and fruit stands.

== Awards and accolades ==
The company has been recognized by various organizations and publications throughout the years. The company was selected by O, The Oprah Magazine to be part of the "Holiday O List" in 2003. In 2005, The Fruit Company was named one of the "Top 50 Best of the Web" for online retailing websites by Internet Retailer Magazine, and in 2013, Los Angeles news outlet KTLA praised The Fruit Company for its Mother's Day gift baskets on the air. The company has also been named one of Oregon's top 15 companies.

== See also ==
- List of companies based in Oregon
- Pine Grove, Hood River County, Oregon
