= William Norman Reed =

American fighter pilot (1917–1944)

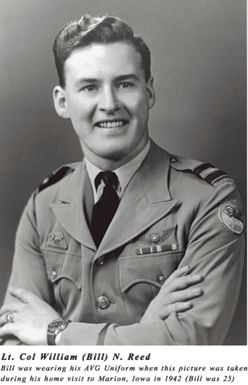
- Born: January 8, 1917; Stone City, Iowa, U.S.
- Died: December 19, 1944 (aged 27); China
- Burial place: Anamosa, Iowa
- Military career
- Allegiance: United States
- Branch: United States Army Air Corps; Flying Tigers; United States Army Air Forces
- Service years: 1940; 1941–1942; 1943–1944
- Rank: Second lieutenant Flight leader Lieutenant colonel
- Nickname: "Bill"
- Commands: 3rd Fighter Group, Fourteenth Air Force
- Awards: Silver Star; Legion of Merit; Distinguished Flying Cross with two or three Oak Leaf Clusters; Air Medal with nine gold stars

William Norman Reed (January 8, 1917 – December 19, 1944) was a World War II fighter pilot, first with the Flying Tigers, then with the Chinese-American Composite Wing, Fourteenth Air Force, United States Army Air Forces. He is credited with nine aerial victories (three with the Tigers, six with the Army), making him an ace.

== Early life ==
Born in Stone City, Iowa, William Reed, commonly called "Bill", grew up in Marion. He graduated from Marion High School in 1935 and cum laude from Loras College in Dubuque in 1939.

== Military service ==
In February 1940, he enlisted in the United States Army Air Corps and was commissioned a second lieutenant. He served as a flight instructor at Barksdale Field in Louisiana.

He joined the Flying Tigers (with the unofficial permission of the American government, which guaranteed he would retain his rank on his return), serving under Claire Chennault. He and other Flying Tigers recruits sailed for Burma from San Francisco aboard the Dutch merchant ship Bloemfontein on July 21, 1941.

He flew 75 missions with the 3rd Squadron (the "Hell's Angels"), and was credited with three confirmed victories in the air between December 23 and 25, 1941. He and Kenneth Jernstedt shared credit for a further 15 airplanes destroyed on the ground on a single mission in March 1942. The Flying Tigers were paid a $500 bonus for every enemy aircraft destroyed, so he received 10.5 bonuses.

After the Tigers were disbanded on July 4, 1942, Reed returned home to Marion, where he embarked on war bond drives. However, he re-enlisted and was commissioned a major in the Army Air Forces in February 1943. He returned to China, joining the Fourteenth Air Force, which was led by Claire Chennault, his old Flying Tigers commander. He was promoted to lieutenant colonel at some point and was placed in command of the 3rd Fighter Group.

Reed flew his last mission on December 19, 1944. His airplane was either badly shot up or ran out of fuel. He bailed out, but apparently struck his head on the tail section and did not open his parachute. His body was recovered, and he was interred in Anamosa, Iowa.

== Awards and honors ==
He was awarded the Silver Star, the Legion of Merit, the Distinguished Flying Cross with two or three Oak Leaf Clusters, the Air Medal with nine gold stars, and other medals.

He was inducted into the Iowa Aviation Hall of Fame in 1997.

A full-scale replica of a Curtiss P-40B fighter, painted with the same markings as the one flown by Reed, was installed at the Iowa Gold Star Museum in October 2012.

== Bibliography ==
- Molesworth, Carl (2020). Flying Tiger Ace: The Story of Bill Reed, China's Shining Mark. Osprey. ISBN 9781472840035.
