= KIHR =

- Hood River, Oregon; United States
- Broadcast area: Columbia Gorge
- Frequency: 1340 kHz
- Branding: KIHR 98.3 FM/1340 AM

Programming
- Format: Country
- Affiliations: ABC News Radio

Ownership
- Owner: Bicoastal Media; (Bicoastal Media Licenses IV, LLC)
- Sister stations: KACI-FM, KCGB-FM, KMSW, KTDS

History
- First air date: October 17, 1950
- Call sign meaning: Hood River

Technical information
- Licensing authority: FCC
- Facility ID: 12433
- Class: C
- Power: 1,000 watts
- Transmitter coordinates: 45°42′5.4″N 121°32′9.3″W
- Translator: 98.3 K252EN (Rockford)

Links
- Public license information: Public file; LMS
- Webcast: Listen live
- Website: KIHR online

KIHR (1340 AM) is a radio station licensed to Hood River, Oregon, United States. The station, which began broadcasting in 1950, is currently owned by Bicoastal Media and the broadcast license is held by Bicoastal Media Licenses IV, LLC. KIHR broadcasts a country music format.

In addition to its usual music programming, KIHR broadcasts National Basketball Association games as a member of the Portland Trail Blazers radio network. Other sports programming on KIHR includes select Hood River Valley High School events, Major League Baseball from ESPN Radio, and University of Oregon Ducks football.

== History ==
=== The beginning ===
KIHR began regular broadcasting on October 17, 1950, with 250 watts of power on a frequency of 1340 kHz. The station's licensee, Oregon-Washington Broadcasters, Inc., was owned by C.H. Fisher and C.O. Fisher.

=== Walden family ownership ===
On April 1, 1967, Paul Walden acquired KIHR through his newly formed Columbia Gorge Broadcasters, Inc. The station received authorization from the Federal Communications Commission to increase the strength of its daytime signal to 1,000 watts beginning in 1970. Nighttime power remained at the previous 250 watt level. Walden added an FM sister station, KCGB-FM (105.5 FM), in 1978. On April 1, 1986, 19 years to the day after he acquired KIHR, Paul Walden sold Columbia Gorge Broadcasters, Inc., and control of both KIHR and KCGB-FM to his son Greg Walden and Greg's wife Mylene.

Greg Walden began his career in broadcasting as a teenager when he started work as a janitor at KIHR, then owned by his father, before moving on to on-air work and, eventually, ownership of the station. In 1998, Greg Walden ran for and was elected to the United States House of Representatives as a Republican from Oregon's 2nd congressional district. During his tenure, until he sold his station group in 2007, Walden was the only broadcast license holder serving in the United States Congress.

=== KIHR today ===
In February 2007, Columbia Gorge Broadcasters, Inc., reached an agreement to sell this station to Bicoastal Columbia River, LLC, as part of a 5-station deal valued at $2.78 million. The deal was approved by the FCC on September 13, 2007, and the transaction was consummated on December 1, 2007. At the time of the sale, KIHR broadcast a country music format.

As part of an internal corporate reorganization, Bicoastal Columbia River, LLC, applied to the FCC in to transfer the broadcast license for this station to Bicoastal Media Licenses IV, LLC. The deal was approved by the FCC on October 29, 2007, and this transaction was also consummated on December 1, 2007. In July 2010 KIHR begin broadcasting on the FM dial at 98.3. This was due to a change at the FCC to allow AM stations to rebroadcast on FM translators. KIHR still broadcasts on AM 1340. In August 2013 KIHR along with sister stations KCGB, KTDS, KACI FM and KMSW began streaming their broadcasts on the internet along with smart devices such as the Amazon Echo Dot.

== Awards and honors ==
KIHR morning show Mid-Columbia Today was named "best public affairs program" for 2002 by the Oregon Association of Broadcasters. KIHR won the Oregon Associated Press Broadcasters Association Division II award for "overall excellence in news coverage" for its work in both 2002 and 2003. KIHR was named the 2004 Small Market Station of the Year at the Marconi Awards presented by the National Association of Broadcasters.
