= Andrew Baldwin (baseball) =

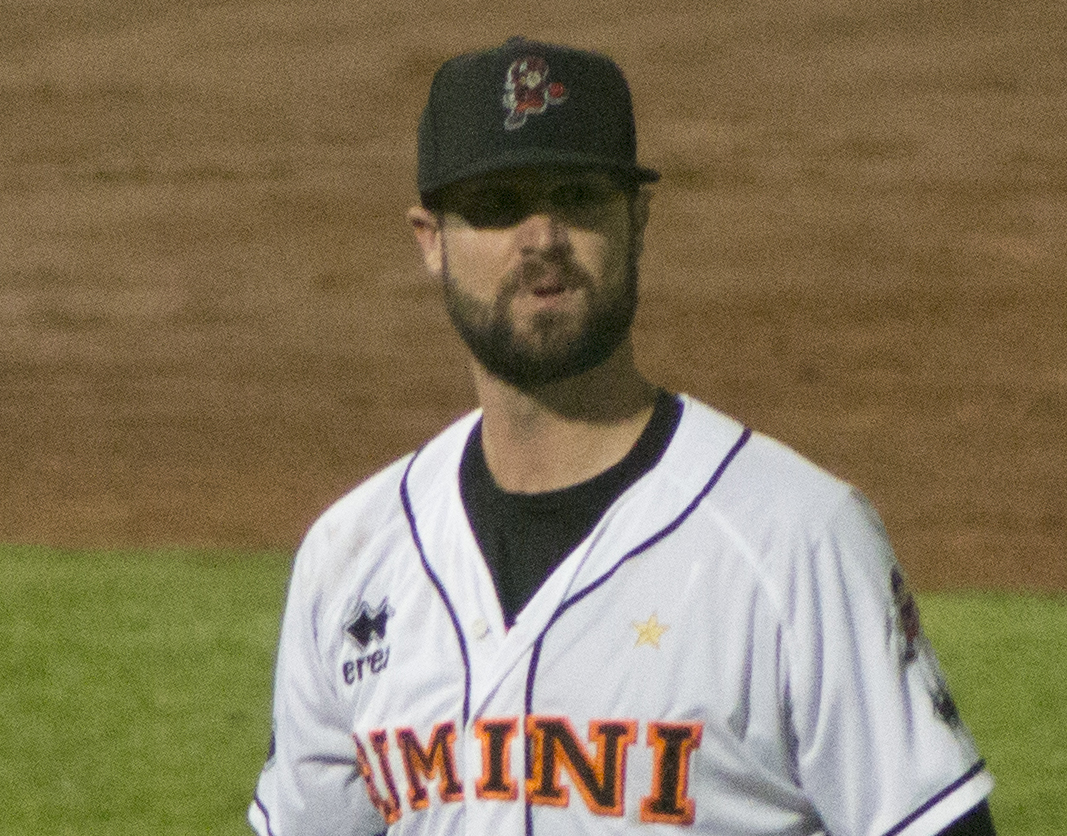
- Baldwin with Rimini Baseball Club in 2013
- Pitcher
- Born: October 20, 1982 (age 43); Duluth, Minnesota
- Bats: Right Throws: Right

Andrew Scott Baldwin (born October 20, 1982) is a former professional baseball pitcher. He was originally drafted by the Philadelphia Phillies in the fifth Round of the 2004 Major League Baseball draft. Baldwin's uncle, John Hiller, was a relief pitcher for the Detroit Tigers.

== Early life ==
Andrew Baldwin was born in Duluth, Minnesota on October 20, 1982. His family relocated to Hood River, Oregon, when he was eleven. He attended Hood River Valley High School in the city, graduating in 2000.

== Collegiate career ==
After graduating, Baldwin attended Oregon State University in Corvallis, Oregon, where he played for the Oregon State Beavers baseball team. Baldwin finished his senior season in 2004 with a 5–5 record and a 5.10 earned run average.

== Professional career ==
=== Philadelphia Phillies ===
Baldwin was selected in the fifth round by the Philadelphia Phillies in the 2004 Major League Baseball draft, being the first Beaver selected that year.

He began his career with the short-season Class-A Batavia Muckdogs of the New York–Penn League. He led the team in innings, strikeouts, and starts. He compiled a 4–6 record with a 5.17 ERA in 15 starts. At the end of the season, he went on to pitch in the Florida Instructional League. In 2005, Baldwin spent entire season with the Class-A Lakewood BlueClaws of the South Atlantic League. He led the league in innings pitched. He was named the Phillies Minor League Pitcher of the Week twice. He finished the season with a 5–12 record with a 4.77 ERA in 27 starts. Baldwin began the 2006 season with the advanced Class-A Clearwater Phillies, where he pitched 147 innings and eight wins.

=== Seattle Mariners ===
On August 20, 2006, he was traded to the Seattle Mariners with teammate Andrew Barb for left-handed pitcher Jamie Moyer. He was then assigned to the Class-A Inland Empire 66ers, where he made three starts. His combined record was 10–9 with a 3.69 ERA. He spent the entire 2007 season with the Double-A West Tenn Diamond Jaxx where he led the Southern League with 166.0 innings pitched. He was 5–12 with a 4.23 ERA. Baldwin finished third among all Mariners farmhands with 115 strikeouts and 8th in ERA.

Dubbed "King of the Hill" by his teammates, Baldwin spent the entire 2008 season with the Triple-A Tacoma Rainiers. He led all Mariners minor leaguers with 10 wins, while also setting a career-high. He finished with a record of 10–5 with a 4.75 ERA.

In 2009, Baldwin spent the entire season with the Triple-A Tacoma Rainiers of the Pacific Coast League. He went 6–11 with 103 strikeouts and a 4.51 ERA in 31 games, 21 starts. On August 10, he was named the Pacific Coast League Pitcher of the Week after he threw a complete game shutout against the Round Rock on August 5.

He signed a minor league contract with the Minnesota Twins for the 2011 season on December 15, 2010.

=== International career ===
In 2012, he played in Mexico, with Rieleros de Aguascalientes and Saraperos de Saltillo.

He started the 2013 season with Rimini Baseball, in Italy, but he was waived after 4 played games.

== Personal life ==
While attending OSU, Baldwin pursued a degree in multi-media communications, a hybrid program of communications and marketing. He spent time as an intern at Nike, Inc.. He was a few credits shy of completing his degree when he was selected in the MLB draft.
