= KMSW =

- The Dalles, Oregon; United States
- Broadcast area: Columbia Gorge
- Frequency: 92.7 MHz
- Branding: 92.7 & 102.9 KMSW

Programming
- Format: Classic rock
- Affiliations: Westwood One

Ownership
- Owner: Bicoastal Media; (Bicoastal Media Licenses IV, LLC)
- Sister stations: KACI-FM, KCGB-FM, KIHR, KTDS

History
- First air date: 2002

Technical information
- Facility ID: 12439
- Class: C3
- ERP: 3,400 watts
- HAAT: 271.1 meters (889 ft)
- Transmitter coordinates: 45°38′58″N 121°16′25″W
- Translator: 102.9 K275AI (Hood River)

Links
- Webcast: Listen Live
- Website: KMSW Online

KMSW (92.7 FM) is a radio station licensed to serve The Dalles, Oregon, United States. The station, established in 2002, is currently owned by Bicoastal Media and the broadcast license is held by Bicoastal Media Licenses IV, LLC.

KMSW broadcasts a classic rock music format. KMSW shares radio studio space with sister stations KTDS and KACI-FM at 719 East 2nd Street in The Dalles.

== History ==
This station received its original construction permit from the Federal Communications Commission on May 18, 2000. The new station was assigned the KMSW call sign by the FCC on August 1, 2000. KMSW received its license to cover from the FCC on January 22, 2003.

In February 2007, original owners M.S.W. Communications, LLC, reached an agreement to sell this station to Bicoastal Media through their Bicoastal Columbia River, LLC, subsidiary as part of a five-station deal valued at 2,775,000. The deal was approved by the FCC on September 13, 2007, and the transaction was consummated on December 1, 2007. As part of an internal corporate reorganization, Bicoastal Media filed an application with the FCC in October 2007 to transfer the broadcast license for KMSW from Bicoastal Columbia River, LLC, to Bicoastal Media Licenses IV, LLC. The transfer was conditionally approved by the FCC on October 29, 2007, and the transaction was consummated on December 1, 2007.

== Translators ==
KMSW programming is also carried on a broadcast translator station to extend or improve the coverage area of the station.

Call sign	Frequency	City of license	FID	ERP (W)	Class	FCC info
K275AI	102.9 FM	Hood River, Oregon	148080	67	D	LMS
