= KTDS =

Radio station in The Dalles, Oregon

- The Dalles, Oregon; United States
- Frequency: 1300 kHz
- Branding: 103.9 The Hawk

Programming
- Format: Country
- Affiliations: Compass Media Networks; Premiere Networks; Westwood One

Ownership
- Owner: Bicoastal Media; (Bicoastal Media Licenses IV, LLC)
- Sister stations: KACI-FM, KCGB-FM, KIHR, KMSW

History
- First air date: June 1955 (as KACI)
- Former call signs: KACI (1955-2025)
- Call sign meaning: The Dalles

Technical information
- Licensing authority: FCC
- Facility ID: 49857
- Class: D
- Power: 1,000 watts day 13 watts night
- Transmitter coordinates: 45°34′54″N 121°7′53″W
- Translator: 103.9 K280FJ (The Dalles)

Links
- Public license information: Public file; LMS
- Website: KTDS Online

KTDS (1300 kHz) is an AM radio station broadcasting a country music format, which is licensed to The Dalles, Oregon, United States. The station is currently owned by Bicoastal Media and the broadcast license is held by Bicoastal Media Licenses IV, LLC.

On September 12, 2025, KACI changed their format from news/talk to country, branded as "103.9 The Hawk" under new KTDS call letters.

== FM Translator ==
KTDS also broadcasts on an FM translator in The Dalles.

Broadcast translator for KTDS
Call sign	Frequency	City of license	FID	ERP (W)	HAAT	Class	FCC info
K280FJ	103.9 FM	The Dalles, Oregon	88557	250	228.7 m (750 ft)	D	LMS

=== Programming ===
KTDS features programming from Westwood One.
