= Ken Jernstedt Airfield =

Airport in Oregon, United States

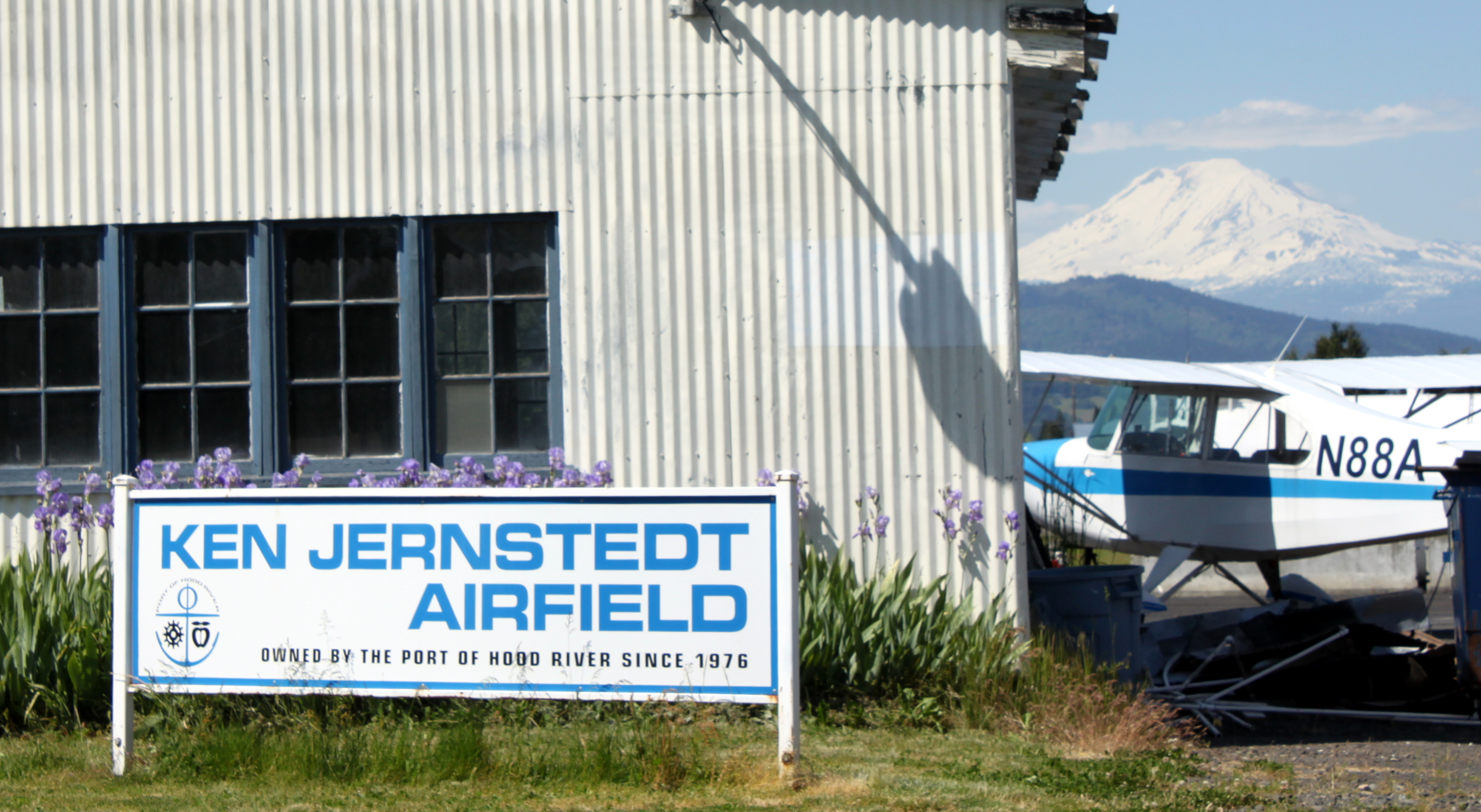
- Ken Jernstedt Airfield, with Mount Adams in the background
- IATA: none; ICAO: K4S2; FAA LID: 4S2

Summary
- Airport type: Public
- Operator: Port of Hood River
- Location: Hood River, Oregon
- Elevation AMSL: 631 ft (192 m)
- Coordinates: 45°40′21.43″N 121°32′11.27″W
- Interactive map of Ken Jernstedt Airfield

Runways
Direction	Length		Surface
Direction	ft	m	Surface
7/25	3,040	927	Asphalt

Ken Jernstedt Airfield (FAA LID: 4S2) is a public airport located two miles (3.2 km) south of the city of Hood River in Hood River County, Oregon, United States.

The fixed-base operator is TacAero, which also bases its tailwheel flight school there. It flies a large fleet of Piper J3 Cubs and Super Cubs and are a big attraction for tourists wanting a scenic flight around the city and Mount Hood.

The airport is named after Kenneth Jernstedt, a former state legislator, mayor of Hood River, and World War II Flying Tigers aviator.

The Western Antique Aeroplane & Automobile Museum is located at the airport.
