= KCGB-FM =

- Hood River, Oregon; United States
- Broadcast area: Columbia Gorge
- Frequency: 105.5 MHz
- Branding: 105.5 & 96.9 KCGB

Programming
- Format: Hot AC
- Affiliations: Westwood One

Ownership
- Owner: Bicoastal Media; (Bicoastal Media Licenses IV, LLC)
- Sister stations: KACI-FM, KIHR, KMSW, KTDS

History
- First air date: November 1, 1978 (as KIHR-FM)
- Former call signs: KIHR-FM (1978–1982)

Technical information
- Licensing authority: FCC
- Facility ID: 12434
- Class: A
- ERP: 1,000 watts
- HAAT: 240 meters (790 ft)
- Transmitter coordinates: 45°39′45″N 121°28′14″W
- Translator: 96.9 K245AF (The Dalles)

Links
- Public license information: Public file; LMS
- Webcast: Listen Live
- Website: KCGB Online

KCGB-FM (105.5 FM) is a radio station licensed to serve Hood River, Oregon, United States. The station is owned by Bicoastal Media and the broadcast license is held by Bicoastal Media Licenses IV, LLC. The radio studios of KCGB-FM and sister station KIHR are located at 1190 22nd Street in Hood River.

KCGB-FM broadcasts a hot adult contemporary music format branded as "Your Music, Your Station" and programmed by Westwood One. The station was assigned the KCGB-FM call sign by the Federal Communications Commission (FCC) on March 15, 1982.

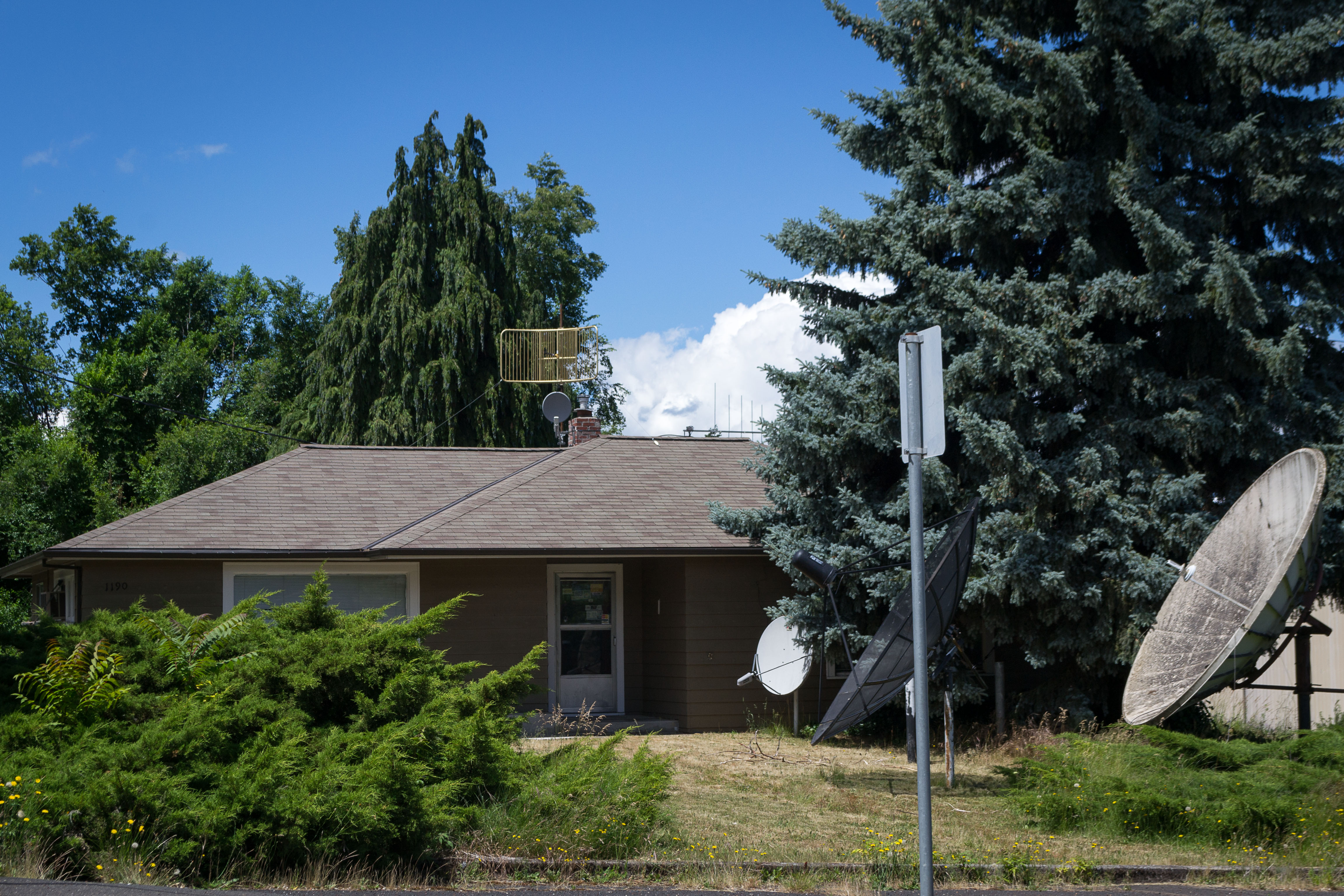
KCGB Studio

== Translators ==
KCGB-FM programming is also carried on a broadcast translator station to extend or improve the coverage area of the station.

Broadcast translator for KCGB-FM
Call sign	Frequency	City of license	FID	ERP (W)	Class	FCC info
K245AF	96.9 FM	The Dalles, Oregon	149243	99	D	LMS
