= Kenneth Jernstedt =

American politician

Kenneth A. Jernstedt

Member of the Oregon Senate from the 18th and 28th district
- In office 1969–1988
- Preceded by: Ben Musa
- Succeeded by: Wayne Fawbush
- Constituency: Gilliam, Hood River, Morrow, Sherman, Wasco, and Wheeler counties (18th District); Gilliam, Hood River, Jefferson, Sherman, Wasco, Wheeler, and Deschutes counties (28th District)

Member of the Oregon House of Representatives from the 22nd district
- In office 1967–1968
- Preceded by: Katherine Musa
- Succeeded by: William H.Dielschneider

Personal details
- Born: July 20, 1917 Yamhill County, Oregon, U.S.
- Died: February 5, 2013 (aged 95) Hood River, Oregon, U.S.
- Party: Republican
- Spouse(s): Laura Elliott; Genevieve Weder Carl
- Profession: Businessman

Kenneth Allen Jernstedt (July 20, 1917 – February 5, 2013) was an American Flying Tigers fighter pilot, a test pilot, a politician and a businessman.

== Early life ==
Jernstedt was born in Yamhill County, Oregon, to Fred and Mae Jernstedt, and grew up on a farm in Carlton. He graduated from Yamhill High School in 1935 and from Linfield College in McMinnville, Oregon, in January 1939.

== Flying career ==
After graduation, he enlisted in the United States Marine Air Corps. He earned his pilot wings in 1941 at Pensacola, Florida, and was assigned to Quantico.

In 1941, Jernstedt was recruited to join the Flying Tigers to fight the Japanese in China, resigning his Marine Corps commission (with the secret approval of the US government). He became a flight leader of the 3rd Squadron, flying the Curtiss P-40. On one mission, he and fellow flight leader William Norman Reed strafed two airfields and were credited with destroying 15 enemy aircraft on the ground; they split the bonus of $7,500 ($500 per aircraft). In his Flying Tigers career, Jernstedt was credited with an additional three victories, for a total of 10.5. In a 1999 interview, he stated that the figure should have been 12.5, but two could not be confirmed. Because he was ill, he received permission to leave the Flying Tigers several weeks before the unit was disbanded in early July 1942 (after the United States had entered the war).

Returning to the United States, he joined Republic Aviation as a civilian test pilot. Among the aircraft he flew was the P-47 Thunderbolt.

== Post-war life and death ==
After the war ended, he moved to Hood River, Oregon, in 1946. He bought the Hood River Bottling Works, a soft drink bottler that he ran for 25 years.

He also entered politics, serving first as mayor of Hood River from 1959 to 1960. He was then elected to the Oregon State Legislature for one term in 1966 and the first of five terms in the Oregon State Senate in 1968. Following his last term as senator, he was again elected mayor of Hood River, from 1989 to 1990.

He married college sweetheart Laura Elliott in 1942; they had a son and three daughters. After her death in 1960, he married Genevieve Weder Carl in 1962, adopting her son and two daughters. Gen was a politician as well, and supported her husband's work, serving as his legislative aide.

Ken Jernstedt died on February 5, 2013, at the age of 95.

== Honors ==
The main entrance gate to the Portland Air National Guard Base was named the Jernstedt Gate in 1981.

In 1996, Jernstedt and the other surviving Flying Tigers pilots were belatedly awarded the Distinguished Flying Cross.

Hood River's public airfield was renamed Ken Jernstedt Airfield on September 6, 2001.

Jernstedt was one of the nine inaugural inductees in the Oregon Aviation Hall of Fame in 2003; he was also inducted into the Oregon Aviation Hall of Honor in the same year.

In 2010, Oregon Department of Veterans' Affairs public affairs officer Mike Allegre, who grew up with Jernstedt's children, wrote of him in the state-published book 150 Years of Oregon Veterans.
