= KDLZ =

KDLZ may refer to:

- Delaware Municipal Airport (ICAO code KDLZ)
- KDLZ (FM), a radio station (101.5 FM) licensed to serve The Dalles, Oregon, United States; see List of radio stations in Oregon
- KDLZ-LP, a defunct low-power radio station (103.1 FM) formerly licensed to serve Yolano, California, United States
