= The Dalles, Oregon =

City in the United States

The Dalles
- City
- City of the Dalles
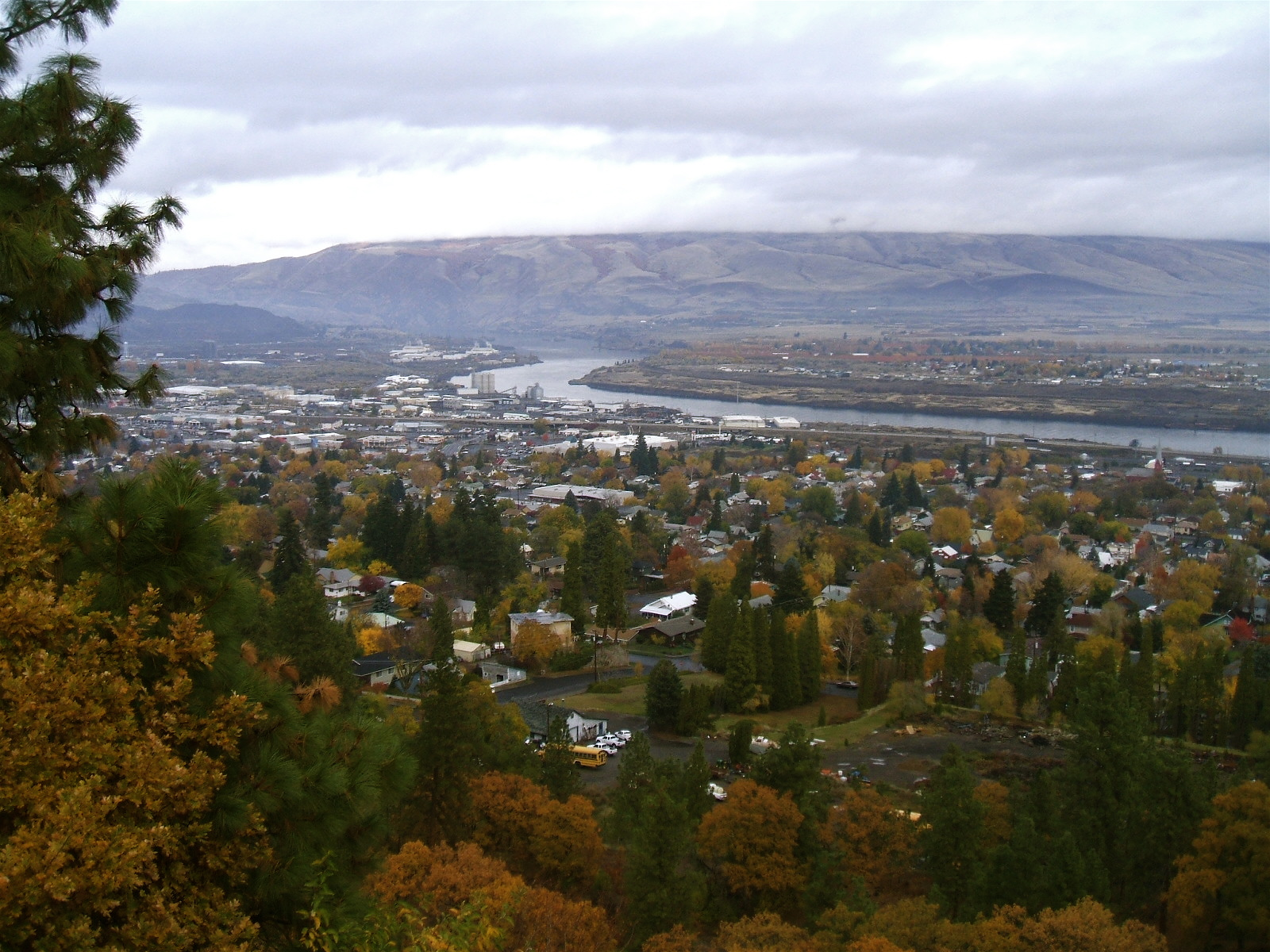
- The Dalles and the Columbia River in November 2008
- Motto: "Cognito timor Vincit" (Latin), "Knowledge Conquers Fear" (English)
- Location in Oregon
- Coordinates: 45°36′6″N 121°11′5″W
- County: Wasco
- Incorporated: 1857

Government
  - Mayor: Richard Mays

Area
  - City: 6.94 sq mi (17.98 km^{2})
  - Land: 6.66 sq mi (17.25 km^{2})
  - Water: 0.28 sq mi (0.72 km^{2})
- Elevation: 243 ft (74 m)

Population (2020)
  - City: 16,010
  - Density: 2,403.5/sq mi (927.99/km^{2})
  - Metro: 26,403
- Time zone: UTC−8 (PST)
  - Summer (DST): UTC−7 (PDT)
- ZIP code: 97058
- Area codes: 458 and 541
- FIPS code: 41-72950
- GNIS feature ID: 2412059
- Website: City of The Dalles

The Dalles (/ˈdælz/ DALZ), formally the City of the Dalles and also called Dalles City, is an inland port, the county seat of and the largest city in Wasco County, Oregon, United States. The population was 16,010 at the 2020 census, and it is the largest city in Oregon along the Columbia River outside the Portland Metropolitan Area. The Dalles is 75 miles (121 km) east of Portland, within the Columbia River Gorge National Scenic Area.

== History ==
The area around The Dalles is known to have been a trading center for American Indians as long as 10,000 years ago and is thus one of the oldest inhabited places in North America.

The site of what is now the city of The Dalles was a major American Indian trading center. The general area is one of the continent's most significant archaeological regions. Lewis and Clark camped near Mill Creek on October 25–27, 1805, and recorded the Indian name for the creek as Quenett.

=== Etymology ===
The name of the city comes from the French word dalle, meaning either "sluice", akin to English "dale" and German T[h]al, "valley", or "flagstone", referring to the columnar basalt rocks carved by the river (in voyageur French used to refer to rapids), which was used by the French-Canadian employees of the North West Company to refer to the rapids of the Columbia River between the present-day city and Celilo Falls. Also in the same area was the Petites Dalles or Little Dalles, or Short Narrows. In French, "les dalles" means "the slabs". When a river flows over hard flat rocks, it becomes shallow, and rapids are created.

=== Fur trade ===
The first use of the name Dalles, according to Oregon Geographic Names, appears in fur trader Gabriel Franchère's Narrative, on April 12, 1814, referring to the long series of major rapids in the river. Starting in the 1810s, Americans and Europeans passed by what became The Dalles, active in the North American fur trade as employees of either the American Pacific Fur Company (PFC) or the Canadian North West Company (NWC). Men like NWC officer David Thompson voyaged both down and up the Columbia, traveling through Celilo Falls. The War of 1812 led to the 1813 liquidation of the PFC, its properties like Fort Astoria sold to the North West Company.

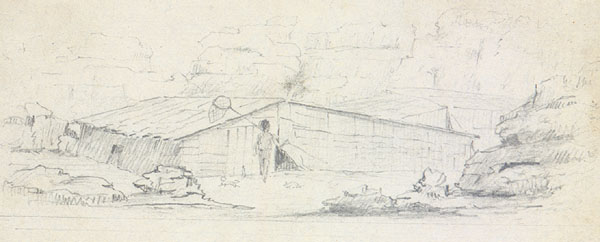
Early illustration of The Dalles, attributed to Joseph Drayton

In 1821 the North West Company was absorbed by the giant London-based Hudson's Bay Company (HBC). Fort Vancouver, built in 1824, replaced Fort Astoria as the regional fur trade headquarters. The HBC's trading network made extensive use of the Columbia River. The rapids of the Columbia River at The Dalles was the largest and longest of the four "great portages", where fur trading boats had to unload and transship their cargoes. Sometimes, during high water, boats traveling downriver would "shoot the rapids" instead of portaging, although the practice was dangerous and many people died as a result over the years.

The Dalles in the 1880s

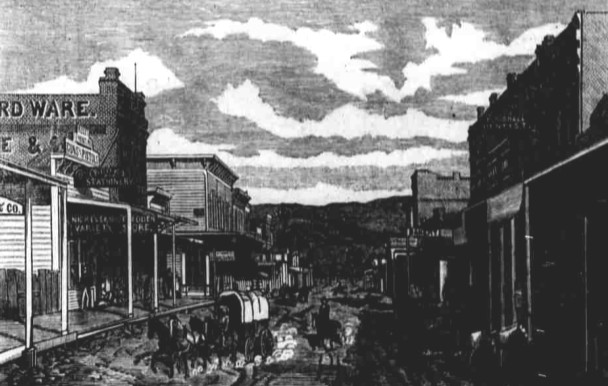
Second Street c. 1880

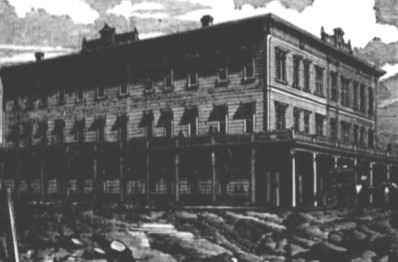
The Umatilla House hotel c. 1880

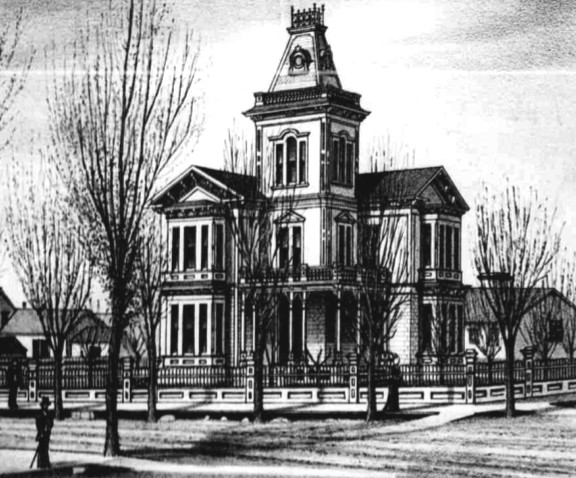
E. B. McFarland House c. 1881

=== Wascopam Mission ===
In 1838 a branch of Jason Lee's Methodist Mission was established at Celilo Falls, named the Wascopam Mission, after the native Wasco Indians. In 1850 the U.S. Army founded a small post at the site of the old mission, being eventually named Fort Dalles. Fort Dalles became the nucleus of the town of The Dalles, which began to develop along the waterfront. In 1855, at the end of the Cayuse War, the Indians living near The Dalles were forcibly relocated by the U.S. Army to the Warm Springs Indian Reservation.

=== American settlement ===
In the early 1840s American settlers began to arrive in significant numbers, traveling overland via the Oregon Trail. The trail ended at The Dalles. It was not possible to take wagons farther west due to steep cliffs that fell straight into the Columbia River. Until the construction of the Barlow Road in 1846, the only way to reach Fort Vancouver and the Willamette Valley was by rafting down the river from The Dalles.

A post office was established within the boundaries of the current city in 1851, and The Dalles was incorporated as a city in 1857. It has been the major commercial center between Portland and Pendleton since. The city was originally named just "Dalles". In 1853 it was changed to "Wascopum," then, in 1860, to "The Dalles".

In 1864, the U.S. Congress appropriated money to build a U.S. mint in The Dalles that was to use gold from Canyon City for coinage. The supply of gold from Canyon City began to dwindle, however, and other problems, such as cost overruns, workers leaving to work the gold fields, and flooding from the Columbia River, also contributed to the project running two years behind schedule and led eventually to its demise. In 1870, the State of Oregon received the property from the U.S. Government and the building was put to other uses. The mint is now home to Freebridge Brewing.

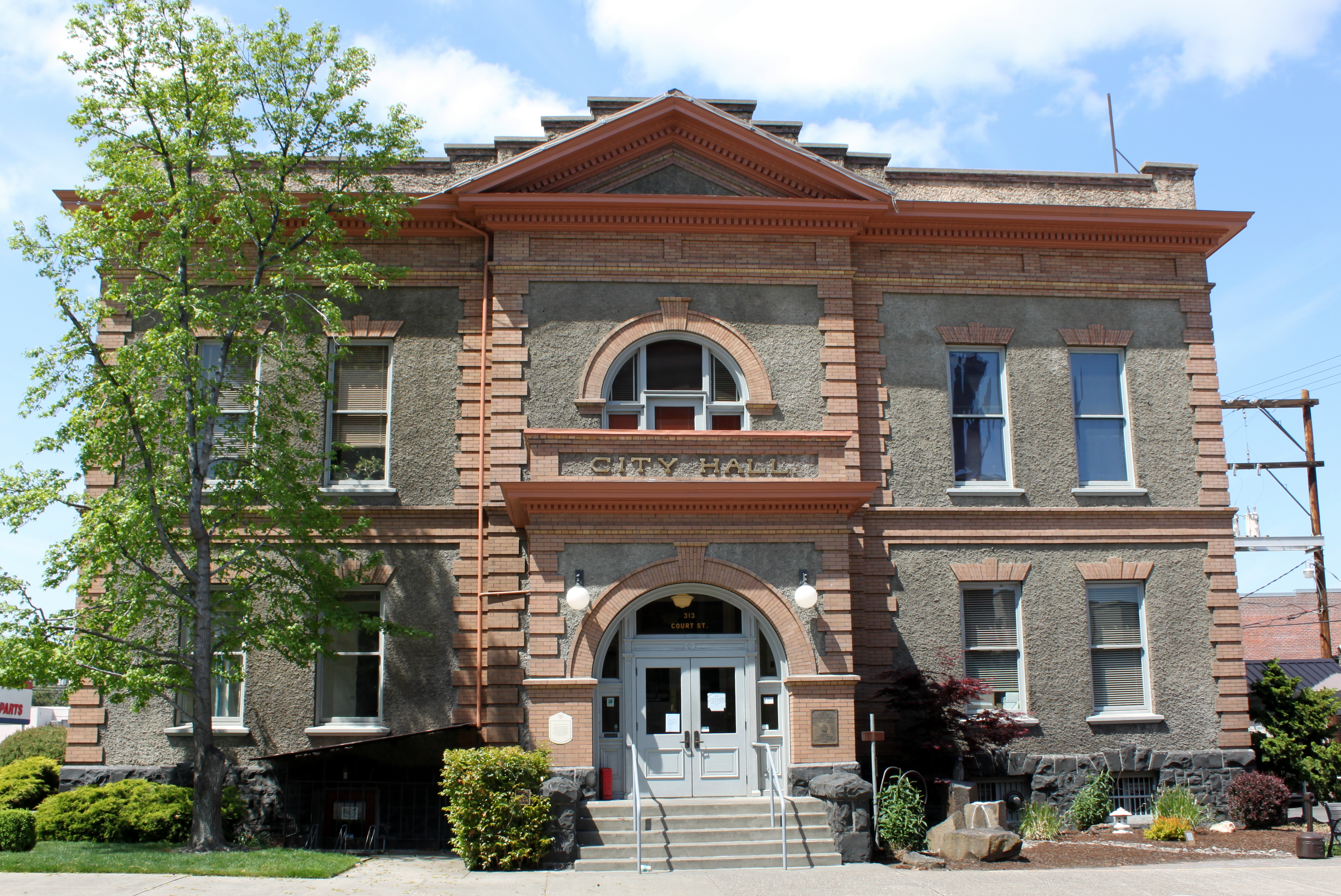
The Dalles City Hall

=== 20th and 21st centuries ===
Construction of The Dalles Dam in 1957 submerged the Long Narrows and Celilo Falls.

In 1963, Ken Kesey's novel One Flew Over the Cuckoo's Nest was published featuring the narrator, Chief, who is from The Dalles.

In 1970, the Bonneville Power Administration opened the Celilo Converter Station near the northern terminus of the Pacific DC Intertie which sends 3,100 megawatts of electricity to Los Angeles.

In 1982, a curly-coated kitten was born on a farm in The Dalles owned by Linda and Dick Koehl. The Koehls used this kitten and her offspring to develop a new breed of cat called the LaPerm, which went on to become a popular, established, championship pedigree cat breed around the world.

In 1984, The Dalles was the site of the first and single largest bioterrorism attack in United States history.

In 1986, Penalty Phase, a film starring Peter Strauss and Melissa Gilbert, was filmed in and around The Dalles.

== Geography ==
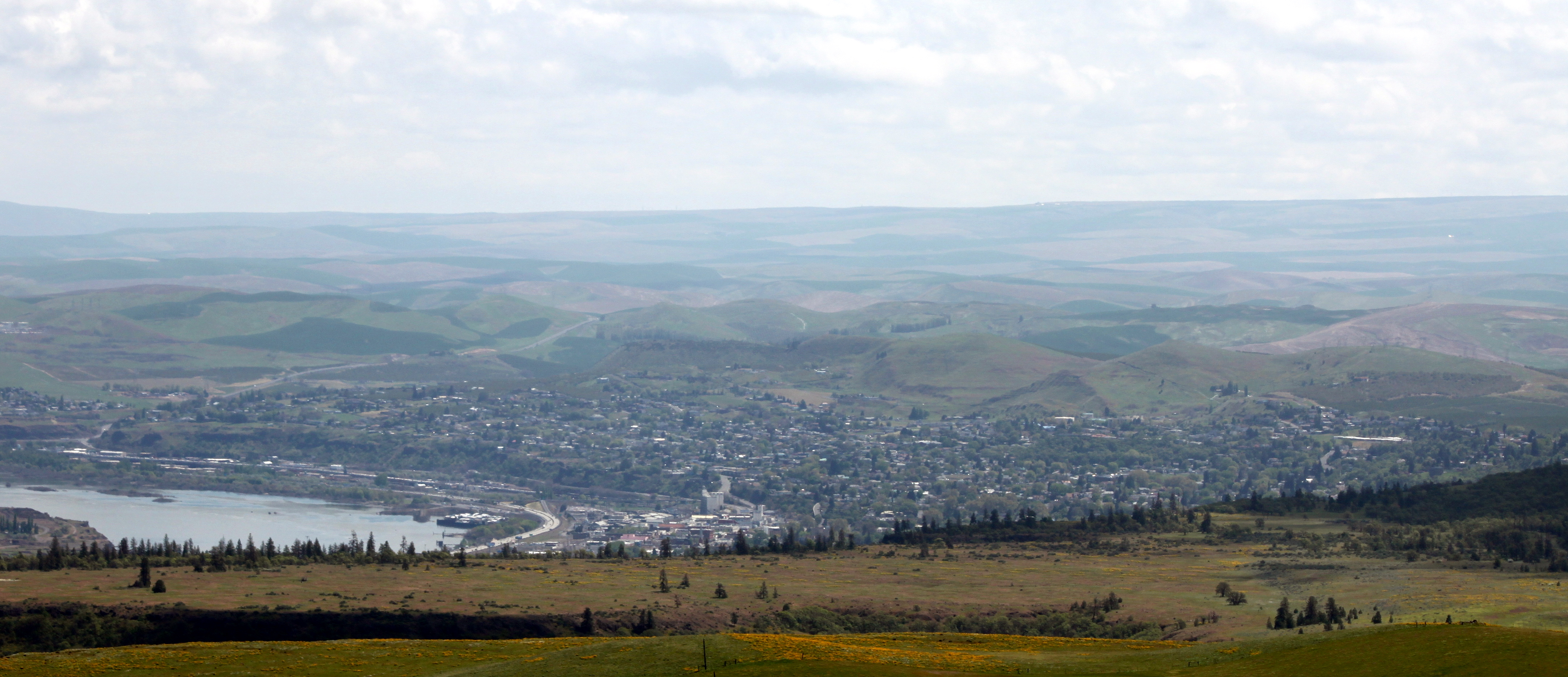
The Dalles and the Columbia River showing surrounding landscape

Highways I-84, US 30, and US 197 meet in the city.

According to the United States Census Bureau, the city has a total area of 20.61 square miles (53.38 km^{2}), of which 20.35 square miles (52.71 km^{2}) is land and 0.26 square miles (0.67 km^{2}) is water.

=== Climate ===
The Dalles is usually classified as a semiarid (Köppen BSk) climate region. However, it has some characteristics of the midlatitude oceanic climate that dominates west of the Cascade Mountains, combined with seasonal precipitation patterns very similar to those found in Mediterranean climates. The city's location in the eastern Columbia Gorge results in the presence of numerous microclimates within a few miles of town. To the immediate west, the winters are significantly wetter, and summers are significantly cooler. In contrast, upland locations to the south are significantly cooler in all seasons. The generally warm and dry summers near town make it the ideal climate for the numerous Bing cherry orchards in the area.

The summer season runs from mid-June through early September and is quite warm by Pacific Northwest standards; however, summer weather often oscillates between intense heat waves and much cooler and windier periods. Except for the occasional sporadic thunderstorm, there is almost no summer rainfall.

From late September through early November, the area experiences an abrupt autumn during which normal temperatures drop very rapidly and cloudy, wet weather quickly picks up. Prior to the sudden onset of the rainy season in mid- to late fall, there are often days with a very wide disparity between daytime and nighttime temperatures, sometimes exceeding 36 °F or 20 °C. There is far less wind in the fall than in spring and early summer, though passing frontal systems can still bring quick bouts of strong wind.

Winter is the wet season in The Dalles. Despite the rain shadow effect created by the Cascades, there is still enough precipitation most years to support relatively high soil moisture levels for most of the winter. This is a very similar pattern to what happens in classic Mediterranean climates – except that the temperatures are significantly colder. The area receives measurable snowfall virtually every year, but the snow totals fluctuate dramatically from one year to the next; some seasons see only one or two brief light snow events while others get major snowstorms and cumulative totals of 20 inches (0.51 m) or more. The most snowfall in a season has been 85.5 inches (2.17 m) between July 1949 and June 1950. Average winter temperatures are only about 3 to 5 °F (1.7 to 2.8 °C) colder than in cities such as Portland and Seattle, and temperatures below 0 °F or −17.8 °C are very rare, but not unheard of – historically occurring on three mornings out of every five winters, but only once since February 1996.

As in the summer, winter temperatures can vary tremendously from one day to the next. During arctic air events the daytime high temperatures will generally be well below 32 °F or 0 °C, while a strong subtropical push can raise temperatures into the 50s and low 60s F, even in January. It is quite common for relatively cold air to become trapped at low elevations due to an inversion above; depending on the temperature of the surface airmass, depth of the inversion layer, and temperatures above the inversion layer, this can result in snow, sleet, freezing rain or a very cold liquid rain.

Springtime conditions generally run from late February through early June, during which time the overall trend gradually becomes warmer and drier and the landscape briefly turns lush and green. This is the windiest season of all, with a powerful west wind on most afternoons. During stormy periods in spring, conditions are usually cloudy and cool, while most sunny and calm days become intensely warm, especially from April onward. Springtime temperatures often vary more from one week to the next than they do from one month to the next.

The growing season is roughly 200 days long in a typical year, generally running from early April through most of October. However, the spring frost dates can range from mid-March to early May, and the fall frost dates can range from late September to mid-November.

A weather station is located at nearby Columbia Gorge Regional Airport, also known as The Dalles Municipal Airport.

Climate data for Columbia Gorge Regional Airport, Washington (1991–2020 normals, extremes 1948–present)
Month	Jan	Feb	Mar	Apr	May	Jun	Jul	Aug	Sep	Oct	Nov	Dec	Year
Record high °F (°C)	68 (20)	70 (21)	80 (27)	95 (35)	107 (42)	118 (48)	112 (44)	110 (43)	105 (41)	90 (32)	74 (23)	70 (21)	118 (48)
Mean maximum °F (°C)	57.8 (14.3)	60.8 (16.0)	71.2 (21.8)	81.6 (27.6)	91.8 (33.2)	98.1 (36.7)	104.0 (40.0)	103.3 (39.6)	95.9 (35.5)	80.0 (26.7)	66.2 (19.0)	56.5 (13.6)	105.5 (40.8)
Mean daily maximum °F (°C)	42.1 (5.6)	48.4 (9.1)	56.7 (13.7)	64.2 (17.9)	73.5 (23.1)	79.1 (26.2)	88.4 (31.3)	87.9 (31.1)	80.4 (26.9)	65.5 (18.6)	50.2 (10.1)	41.4 (5.2)	64.8 (18.2)
Daily mean °F (°C)	36.5 (2.5)	40.2 (4.6)	46.4 (8.0)	53.0 (11.7)	61.3 (16.3)	67.1 (19.5)	74.7 (23.7)	74.1 (23.4)	66.3 (19.1)	54.0 (12.2)	42.7 (5.9)	36.2 (2.3)	54.4 (12.4)
Mean daily minimum °F (°C)	30.9 (−0.6)	32.1 (0.1)	36.2 (2.3)	41.7 (5.4)	49.0 (9.4)	55.1 (12.8)	61.0 (16.1)	60.3 (15.7)	52.2 (11.2)	42.6 (5.9)	35.1 (1.7)	31.0 (−0.6)	43.9 (6.6)
Mean minimum °F (°C)	17.1 (−8.3)	18.9 (−7.3)	24.7 (−4.1)	30.1 (−1.1)	36.3 (2.4)	44.9 (7.2)	50.7 (10.4)	49.7 (9.8)	40.4 (4.7)	28.2 (−2.1)	21.6 (−5.8)	18.8 (−7.3)	11.0 (−11.7)
Record low °F (°C)	−8 (−22)	−4 (−20)	6 (−14)	23 (−5)	28 (−2)	37 (3)	40 (4)	42 (6)	29 (−2)	15 (−9)	−1 (−18)	−5 (−21)	−8 (−22)
Average precipitation inches (mm)	2.38 (60)	1.58 (40)	1.18 (30)	0.83 (21)	0.76 (19)	0.48 (12)	0.16 (4.1)	0.16 (4.1)	0.33 (8.4)	1.14 (29)	1.97 (50)	2.68 (68)	13.65 (347)
Average snowfall inches (cm)	1.9 (4.8)	0.8 (2.0)	0.5 (1.3)	0.0 (0.0)	0.0 (0.0)	0.0 (0.0)	0.0 (0.0)	0.0 (0.0)	0.0 (0.0)	trace	0.5 (1.3)	1.3 (3.3)	4.8 (12)
Average precipitation days (≥ 0.01 in)	14.1	11.3	10.8	7.9	6.4	3.8	1.5	1.7	2.7	8.3	13.1	13.9	95.5
Average snowy days (≥ 0.1 in)	3.7	2.2	0.5	0.0	0.0	0.0	0.0	0.0	0.0	0.1	1.4	5.0	15.8
Source: NOAA (snow 1981–2010)

== Economy ==
In 2006, Google began building a major data center, known locally as Project 02, along the Columbia River in The Dalles, using the area's reliable hydroelectric power and underutilized fiber optic capacity. The new complex includes two buildings, each approximately the size of a football field, and two cooling plants, each four stories high. The project promised hundreds of jobs in the area, mainly in construction, with an additional 200 permanent positions expected later in 2006 although as of 2013 Google employed only 150 combined company employees and contractors in The Dalles.

=== Top employers ===
In 2021, Wasco County published a list of top employers in the region. Mid-Columbia Medical Center was the number one employer listed with over 500 employees; a local school district, Oregon Cherry Growers and Fred Meyer all reported more than 250 employers. Google employed between 100 and 250 people, according to the list.

In 2012, the top 15 employers in The Dalles according to the Mid-Columbia Economic Development District report on "Largest Employers in Wasco County" were:

#	Employer	# of employees
1	Adventist Health Columbia Gorge	915
2	North Wasco County School District	360
3	Oregon Cherry Growers	275
4	State of Oregon	243
5	Fred Meyer	230
6	Oregon Veteran's Home	208
7	Columbia Gorge Community College	200
8	Wasco County	181
9	Google	150
10	Safeway	142
11	U.S. Army Corps of Engineers	125
12	City of The Dalles	100
13	Home Depot	100
14	Cousin's Country Inn	100
15	Orchard View Farms	90

== Education ==
The Dalles is home to Oregon School District 21. Originally 2 school districts; District 9 in the Chenoweth area and District 12 which included much of The Dalles.

District 21 includes 3 elementary schools: Colonel Wright Elementary, Chenoweth Elementary and Dry Hollow Elementary. District 21 is also home to Innovations Academy, The Dalles Middle School and The Dalles High School.

St Mary's Academy is a k-8 school affiliated with the Catholic Church in The Dalles.

Columbia Lutheran School is a Christian elementary school of the Evangelical Lutheran Synod in The Dalles.

The Dalles is also home to the main campus of Columbia Gorge Community College which began in 1977 as Wasco Area Education Service District. It is a leading institution in renewable energy technology education and training.

== Demographics ==
Historical population
Census	Pop.	Note	%±
1860	802		—
1870	942		17.5%
1880	2,232		136.9%
1890	3,239		45.1%
1900	3,542		9.4%
1910	4,880		37.8%
1920	5,807		19.0%
1930	5,833		0.4%
1940	6,266		7.4%
1950	7,676		22.5%
1960	10,493		36.7%
1970	10,423		−0.7%
1980	10,820		3.8%
1990	11,060		2.2%
2000	12,156		9.9%
2010	13,620		12.0%
2020	16,010		17.5%
source: U.S. Decennial Census

=== 2020 census ===
As of the 2020 census, The Dalles had a population of 16,010 people, and the median age was 39.2 years. 22.1% of residents were under the age of 18 and 20.5% of residents were 65 years of age or older. For every 100 females there were 96.1 males, and for every 100 females age 18 and over there were 93.0 males age 18 and over.

According to the 2020 Decennial Census Demographic and Housing Characteristics profile, 99.8% of residents lived in urban areas, while 0.2% lived in rural areas.

There were 6,272 households in The Dalles, of which 30.2% had children under the age of 18 living in them. Of all households, 43.5% were married-couple households, 18.3% were households with a male householder and no spouse or partner present, and 30.0% were households with a female householder and no spouse or partner present. About 29.8% of all households were made up of individuals and 14.4% had someone living alone who was 65 years of age or older.

There were 6,643 housing units, of which 5.6% were vacant. Among occupied housing units, 59.5% were owner-occupied and 40.5% were renter-occupied. The homeowner vacancy rate was 1.5% and the rental vacancy rate was 5.5%.

Racial composition as of the 2020 census
Race	Number	Percent
White	11,827	73.9%
Black or African American	90	0.6%
American Indian and Alaska Native	246	1.5%
Asian	196	1.2%
Native Hawaiian and Other Pacific Islander	177	1.1%
Some other race	1,457	9.1%
Two or more races	2,017	12.6%
Hispanic or Latino (of any race)	3,561	22.2%

=== 2010 census ===
As of the census of 2010, there were 13,620 people, 5,472 households, and 3,441 families residing in the city. The population density was 2,144.9 inhabitants per square mile (828.2/km^{2}). There were 5,903 housing units at an average density of 929.6 per square mile (358.9/km^{2}). The racial makeup of the city was 87.9% White, 0.5% African American, 1.5% Native American, 1.0% Asian, 0.8% Pacific Islander, 5.7% from other races, and 2.7% from two or more races. Hispanic or Latino people of any race were 17.0% of the population.

There were 5,472 households, of which 30.3% had children under the age of 18 living with them, 46.1% were married couples living together, 12.4% had a female householder with no husband present, 4.4% had a male householder with no wife present, and 37.1% were non-families. 31.0% of all households were made up of individuals, and 14.1% had someone living alone who was 65 years of age or older. The average household size was 2.40 and the average family size was 2.99.

The median age in the city was 39.7 years. 23.8% of residents were under the age of 18; 8.3% were between the ages of 18 and 24; 24.1% were from 25 to 44; 25.8% were from 45 to 64; and 17.9% were 65 years of age or older. The gender makeup of the city was 48.4% male and 51.6% female.

=== 2000 census ===
As of the census of 2000, there were 12,156 people, 4,896 households, and 3,226 families residing in the city. The population density was 892.3/km^{2}. There were 5,227 housing units at an average density of 383.7/km^{2}. The racial makeup of the city was 87.8% White, 0.4% African American, 1.2% Native American, 1.0% Asian, 0.8% Pacific Islander, 6.2% from other races, and 2.6% from two or more races. Hispanic or Latino people of any race were 10.5% of the population.

There were 4,896 households, out of which 30.0% had children under the age of 18 living with them, 51.1% were married couples living together, 10.6% had a female householder with no husband present, and 34.1% were non-families. 29.2% of all households were made up of individuals, and 13.5% had someone living alone who was 65 years of age or older. The average household size was 2.40, and the average family size was 2.94.

In the city, the population was spread out, with 24.8% under the age of 18, 7.9% from 18 to 24, 25.7% from 25 to 44, 23.5% from 45 to 64, and 18.1% who were 65 years of age or older. The median age was 39 years. For every 100 females, there were 94.7 males. For every 100 females age 18 and over, there were 91.5 males.

The median income for a household in the city was $35,430, and the median income for a family was $43,041. Males had a median income of $36,387 versus $22,583 for females. The per capita income for the city was $17,511. About 9.0% of families and 12.4% of the population were below the poverty line, including 16.6% of those under age 18 and 8.6% of those age 65 or over.

== Arts and culture ==
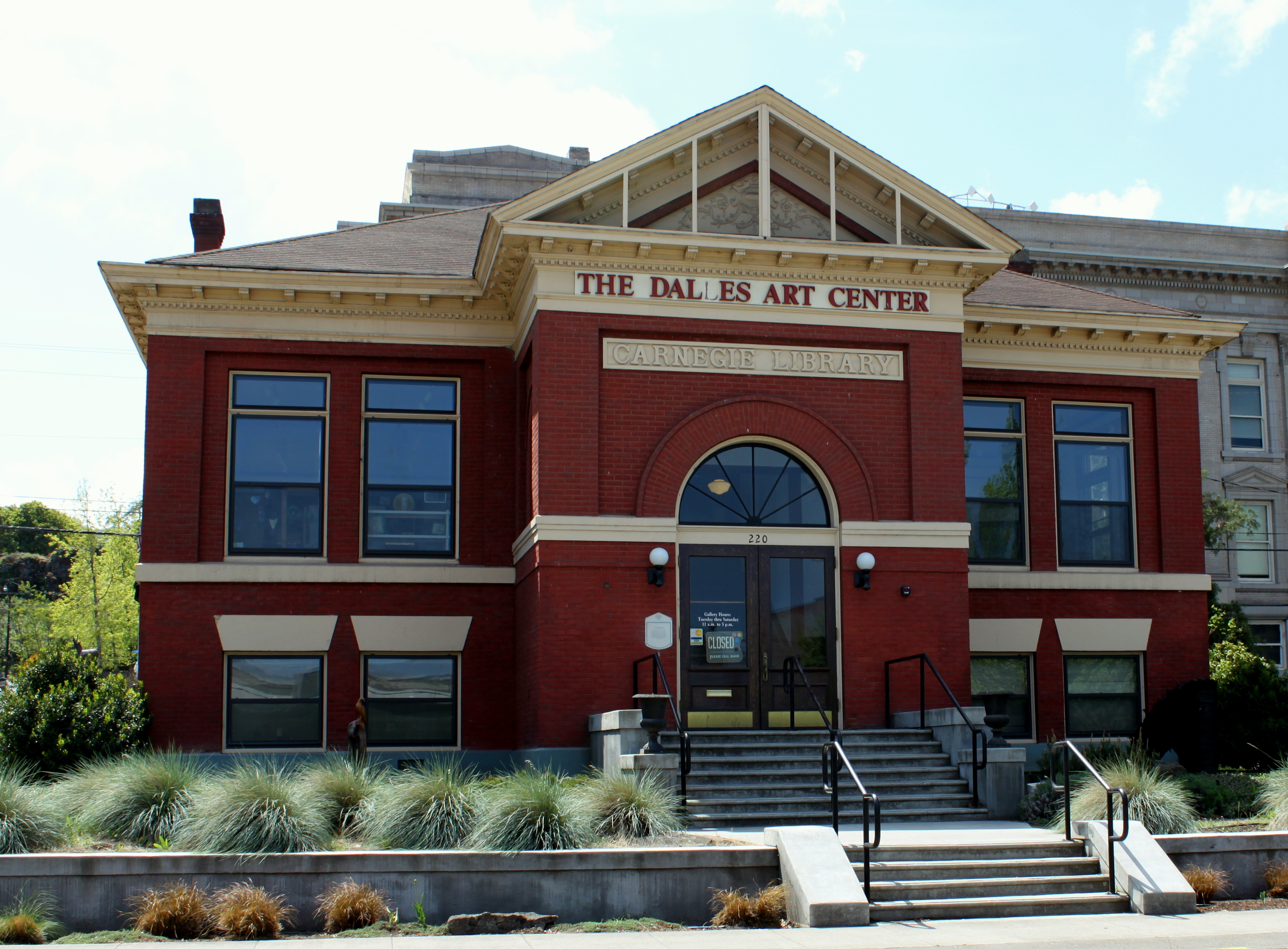
Former Carnegie library, currently The Dalles Art Center

=== Annual cultural events ===
The Northwest Cherry Festival is held in The Dalles in April.

=== Museums and other points of interest ===
- Columbia Gorge Discovery Center & Museum, the official interpretive center for the Columbia River Gorge National Scenic Area
- Fort Dalles Museum, Oregon's oldest history museum located in the Surgeon's Quarters built in 1856 at Fort Dalles
- Pulpit Rock, used by Methodist missionaries to preach to Native Americans
- North Wasco County Aquatic Center, the most recent in many iterations of the local swimming pool. Previously known as the Natatorium, "Nat" or "Nat Club".
- The river front trail, runs along the Columbia River from the Discovery Center to the local boat marina.
- Sorosis Park, a 45 acres (18 ha) park. Contains a memorial rose garden with the Vogt Fountain as the centerpiece.

== Media ==
=== Radio ===
- KTDS 1300/103.9 FM
- KODL 1440AM/99.1 FM
- KMSW 92.7/102.9 FM
- KACI-FM 93.5 FM
- KCGB-FM 105.5/96.9 FM
- KDLZ 101.5 FM

=== Television ===
- K34KE-D translator for KGW Portland, NBC affiliate
- K23OV-D translator for KOIN Portland, CBS affiliate

=== Newspaper ===
- Columbia Gorge News
- Columbia Community Connection Digital, Bilingual and Local News for the Mid-Columbia Region

== Rajneeshee Movement ==
In 1984, The Dalles was the scene of a bioterrorist incident launched by members of the Rajneesh Movement in an attempt to gain control of the local government of Wasco County, which failed on Election Day. Salmonella placed in ten restaurants resulted in 751 cases of Salmonellosis. It was the first known bioterrorism attack of the 20th century in the United States. The circumstances of the attack are documented in an American Medical Association article (JAMA Vol 278, No 5, page 389, August 6, 1997).

== Notable people ==
- Homer D. Angell, Republican U.S. congressman for OR-3, 1939–1955
- Lefty Bertrand, Major League Baseball player
- John Callahan, cartoonist, grew up in The Dalles
- H. L. Davis, Oregon's only Pulitzer Prize winner in literature with Honey in the Horn (1936)
- Ken Dayley, Major League Baseball player
- Alan Embree, Major League Baseball player
- Shemia Fagan, Democratic State Senator for Portland and Former Oregon Secretary of State, 2021–2023.
- Jacob Glanville, Ph.D., computational immunoengineer and businessperson
- Jennifer Lyon, Survivor: Palau contestant
- Todd Nelson, touring professional tennis player
- Wilma Roberts, local photographer who lived and worked at the Elite Studio, later called "Mel O's" in The Dalles
- Greg Walden, Republican congressman from OR-2, 1999–2021.
- Philip Whalen, a poet associated with the Beat Generation, grew up in The Dalles
- Terry A. Davis, computer programmer best known for creating the operating system TempleOS.
- Virginia Admiral, painter, poet and mother of Robert De Niro.

== Sister cities ==
The Dalles has one sister city:

- Miyoshi City, Japan (formerly Ikeda)

== See also ==
- List of cities in Oregon
