= KACI-FM =

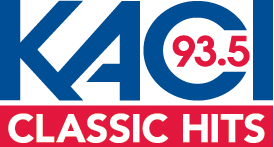
- The Dalles, Oregon; United States
- Broadcast area: Columbia Gorge
- Frequency: 93.5 MHz
- Branding: KACI 93.5 Classic Hits

Programming
- Format: Classic hits

Ownership
- Owner: Bicoastal Media; (Bicoastal Media Licenses IV, LLC)
- Sister stations: KCGB-FM, KIHR, KMSW, KTDS

History
- First air date: 1985 (at 97.7)
- Former frequencies: 97.7 MHz (1985–2012)

Technical information
- Licensing authority: FCC
- Facility ID: 49856
- Class: C2
- ERP: 2,300 watts
- HAAT: 588 meters (1,929 ft)
- Transmitter coordinates: 45°42′44″N 121°6′49″W

Links
- Public license information: Public file; LMS
- Webcast: Listen Live

KACI-FM (93.5 FM) is a radio station broadcasting a classic hits format. Licensed to The Dalles, Oregon, United States. The station is currently owned by Bicoastal Media and the broadcast license is held by Bicoastal Media Licenses IV, LLC.

== History ==
KACI-FM came on the air in 1985 at 97.7 FM. The format was Top 40 until late 1993, when it switched to JRN's satellite-fed Oldies. Currently, the music format is "hits from the ’60s, ’70s & ’80s." KACI-FM was simulcast with AM 1300 KACI for many years but went to a news and talk radio format. In 2012, it moved to its current tower and frequency, 93.5 FM.
