= Columbia Gorge Community College =

College in The Dalles, Oregon, U.S.

Coordinates: 45.591°N 121.189°W

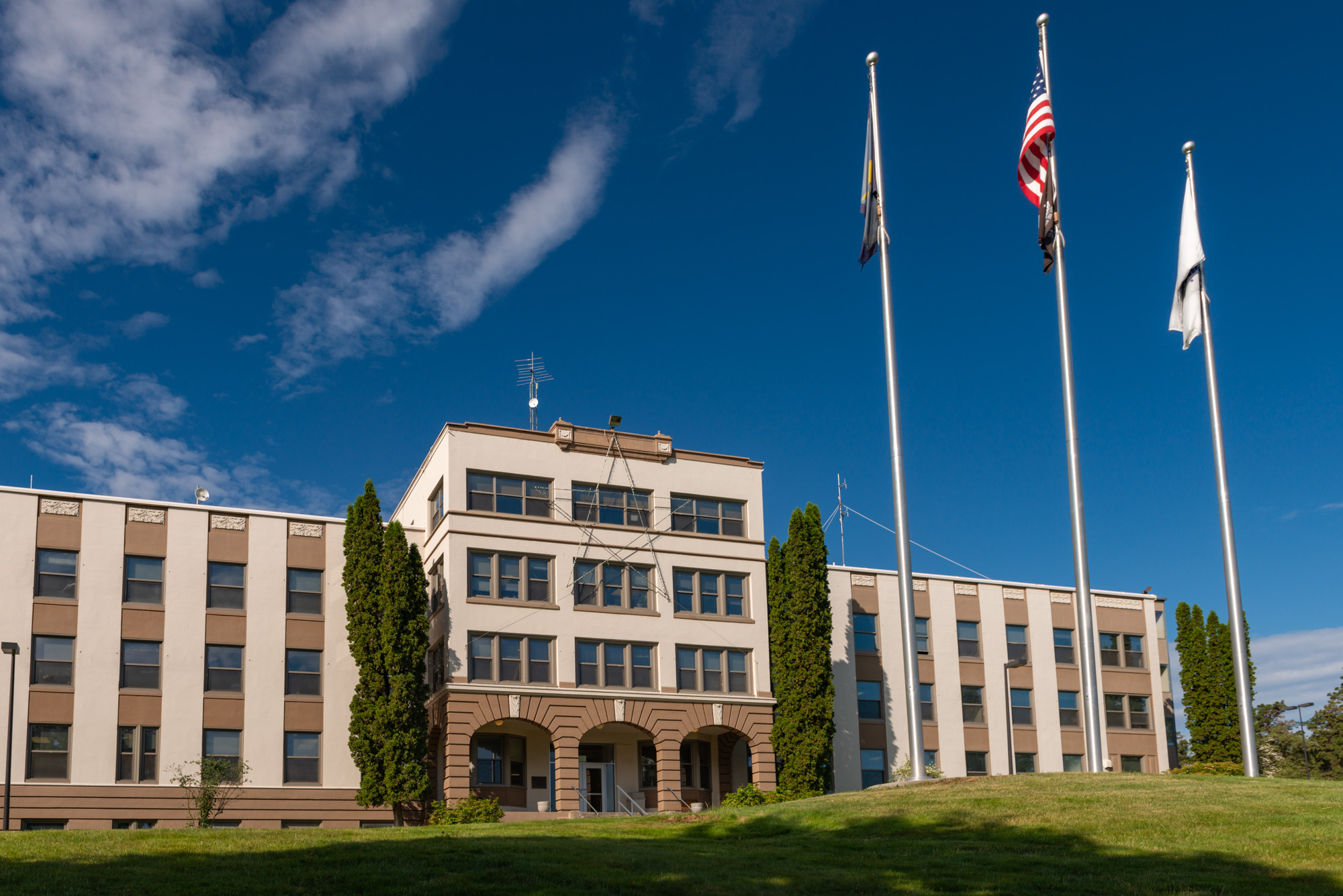
- The front of Building 2 on The Dalles Campus
- Former name: Treaty Oak
- Type: Public community college
- Established: 1977
- President: Kenneth Lawson
- Location: The Dalles and Hood River, Oregon, United States
- Campus: Rural
- Colors: Plum and White
- Mascot: Chinook
- Website: www.cgcc.edu

Columbia Gorge Community College (CGCC) is a public community college with campuses in The Dalles and Hood River, Oregon. Established in 1977, it serves residents of Wasco and Hood River counties and the broader Columbia River Gorge region. The college offers transfer degrees, career and technical education programs, adult basic skills, and workforce training. CGCC is accredited by the Northwest Commission on Colleges and Universities and is a member of the Northwest Athletic Conference.

== Academics ==
Columbia Gorge Community College offers transfer degrees, including Associate of Arts Oregon Transfer and other pathways designed for students intending to complete a bachelor’s degree at four‑year institutions. The college also provides certificates and degrees in a range of career and technical education (CTE) fields aligned with regional workforce needs.

CGCC’s CTE programs include electro‑mechanical technology with a focus on renewable energy systems, construction technology and pre‑construction, and advanced manufacturing and fabrication. Additional offerings include aviation maintenance technician training and healthcare programs such as nursing and medical assistant certification, supported by dedicated labs and facilities at both The Dalles campus (simulation lab, science labs) and the Hood River Center (science labs). The college also delivers short‑term workforce training, adult basic education, GED, and English language instruction in both The Dalles and Hood River.

Starting in 2027, the college will add a Bachelors of Applied Science in Education (BASE) making it one of 5 Oregon Community Colleges to offer 4-year bachelors degrees.

== Campus ==
The Dalles campus is located at 400 East Scenic Drive, next to Sorosis Park, overlooking the city. The campus consists of six main buildings and several smaller structures including student on-campus student housing surrounding an outdoor amphitheater.

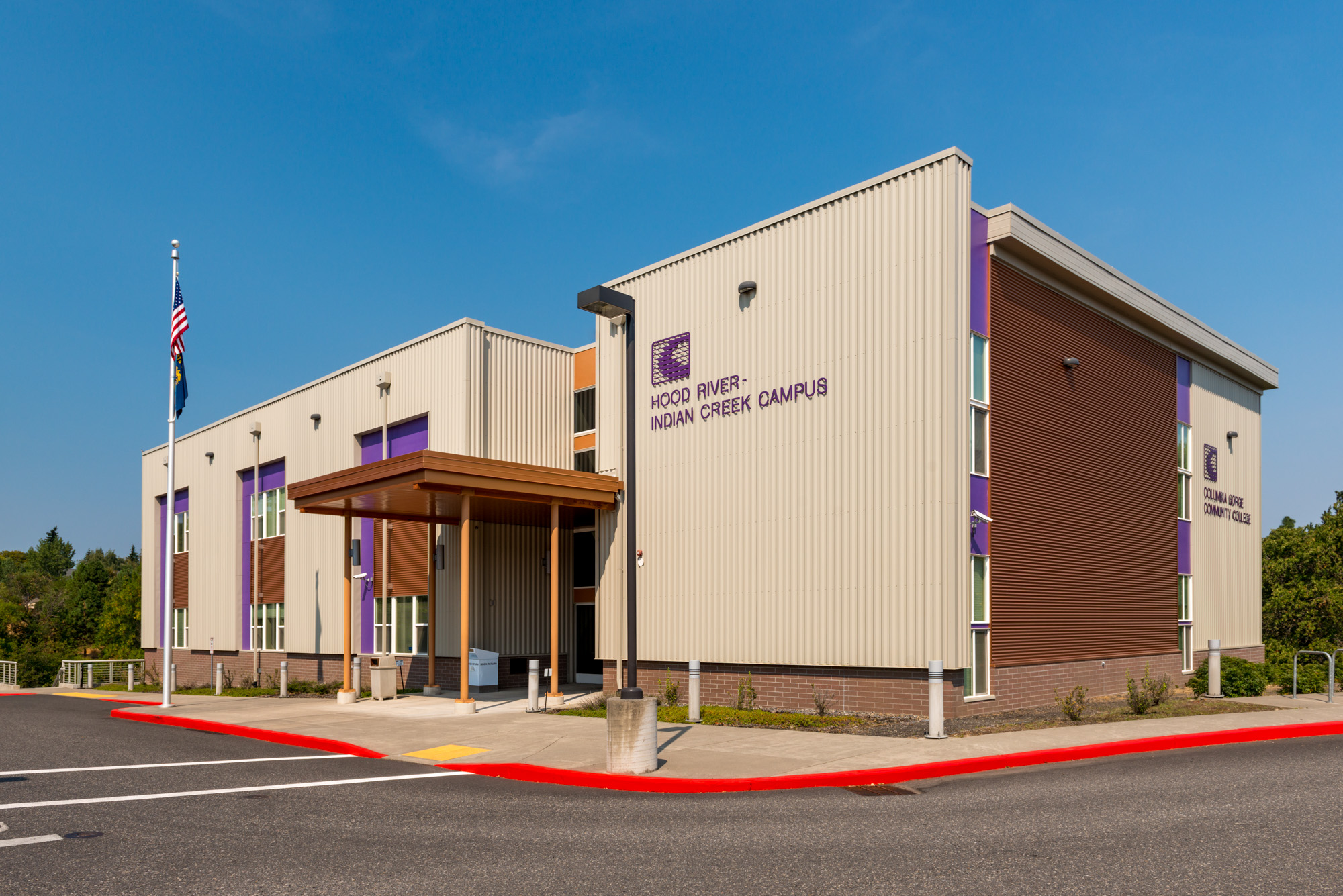
CGCC - Hood River Campus

The Hood River Center is located at 1730 College Way on the Indian Creek hiking trail in Hood River, Oregon.

== Athletics ==
CGCC is a member of the Northwest Athletic Conference (NWAC). In the fall of 2024, the college introduced men’s and women’s cross country as its first intercollegiate athletic teams. As of mid-2026, CGCC continues to develop its athletic program offerings including the addition of Men's and Women's Soccer.

== History ==
The institution first opened its doors in 1977 as the Wasco Area Education Service District, later renamed Treaty Oak Education Service District, offering post‑secondary education in leased facilities in downtown The Dalles. In 1989, voters approved a change in designation from an education service district to a community college district, and the institution adopted the name Columbia Gorge Community College. A bond measure passed in 1993 funded the purchase and renovation of a former hospital, which became the college’s primary campus in The Dalles.

In 2001, voters in Wasco and Hood River counties approved the annexation of Hood River County into the college’s service district, enabling CGCC to expand its offerings in the western part of the Columbia River Gorge. The college initially operated the Hood River Center in leased space near the waterfront before constructing a dedicated building in 2008. That same year, CGCC completed a new Health Sciences building on the Dalles campus to support nursing and other allied health programs.

In 2006–07, the college launched one of the earliest wind technician training programs offered by a community college on the West Coast, under the title Renewable Energy Technology. The program later evolved into Electro‑Mechanical Technology while retaining an emphasis on renewable energy systems. CGCC achieved independent accreditation from the Northwest Commission on Colleges and Universities in 2013, after previously operating under a contractual arrangement with Portland Community College.

Leadership of the college has included founding president William Bell, who oversaw the relocation to the dedicated campus in the 1990s, and Frank Toda, whose tenure encompassed the annexation of Hood River County, development of nursing and other new programs, and planning for expanded facilities. From 2018 to 2023, the college was led by president Marta Yera‑Cronin, who was succeeded in 2023 by Kenneth Lawson. In the late 2010s and early 2020s, CGCC undertook additional capital projects in The Dalles, including a career and technical education center and on‑campus student housing that opened in 2021 with support from state and local funding. During this period, the college expanded its career and technical offerings, adding programs in construction technology, advanced manufacturing and fabrication, and aviation maintenance technician training, and began planning programs such as agriculture technology.

In November 2024, voters approved Ballot Measure 33‑111, a 13 million‑dollar bond for campus improvements that kept the existing bond tax rate in place and qualified the college for additional state matching funds.

== See also ==
- List of Oregon community colleges
