= Mount Hood Highway =

Highway in Oregon, United States

Mount Hood Highway No. 26
- Mount Hood Highway highlighted in red

Route information
- Maintained by ODOT
- Length: 96.74 mi (155.69 km)
- Component highways: US 26; OR 35

Major junctions
- West end: US 26 / OR 10 / OR 99W in Portland
- I-205 in Portland; US 26 / OR 35 near Mount Hood
- North end: US 30 / OR 35 at Hood River

Location
- Country: United States
- State: Oregon
- Counties: Multnomah, Clackamas, Hood River

Highway system
- Oregon Highways; Interstate; US; State; Named; Scenic

The Mount Hood Highway No. 26 (see Oregon highways and routes) is the Oregon Department of Transportation's designation for a 96.74-mile-long (155.69 km) highway from Portland east around the south side of Mount Hood and north via Bennett Pass to Hood River. It is marked as U.S. Route 26 from Portland to near Mount Hood and Oregon Route 35 the rest of the way to Hood River.

Much of the highway is part of the Mount Hood Scenic Byway, a National Scenic Byway which connects Troutdale with Hood River via the southern flank of Mount Hood. The Byway's route includes parts of present-day U.S. Route 26 and Oregon Route 35 and the historic Barlow Road through the Mount Hood Corridor. It also forms a loop with the Historic Columbia River Highway, an All-American Road.

The portion from Sandy to Barlow Pass on the south flank of Mount Hood is aligned to the land portion of the historic Oregon Trail. It was developed in the 1840s as the Barlow Road.

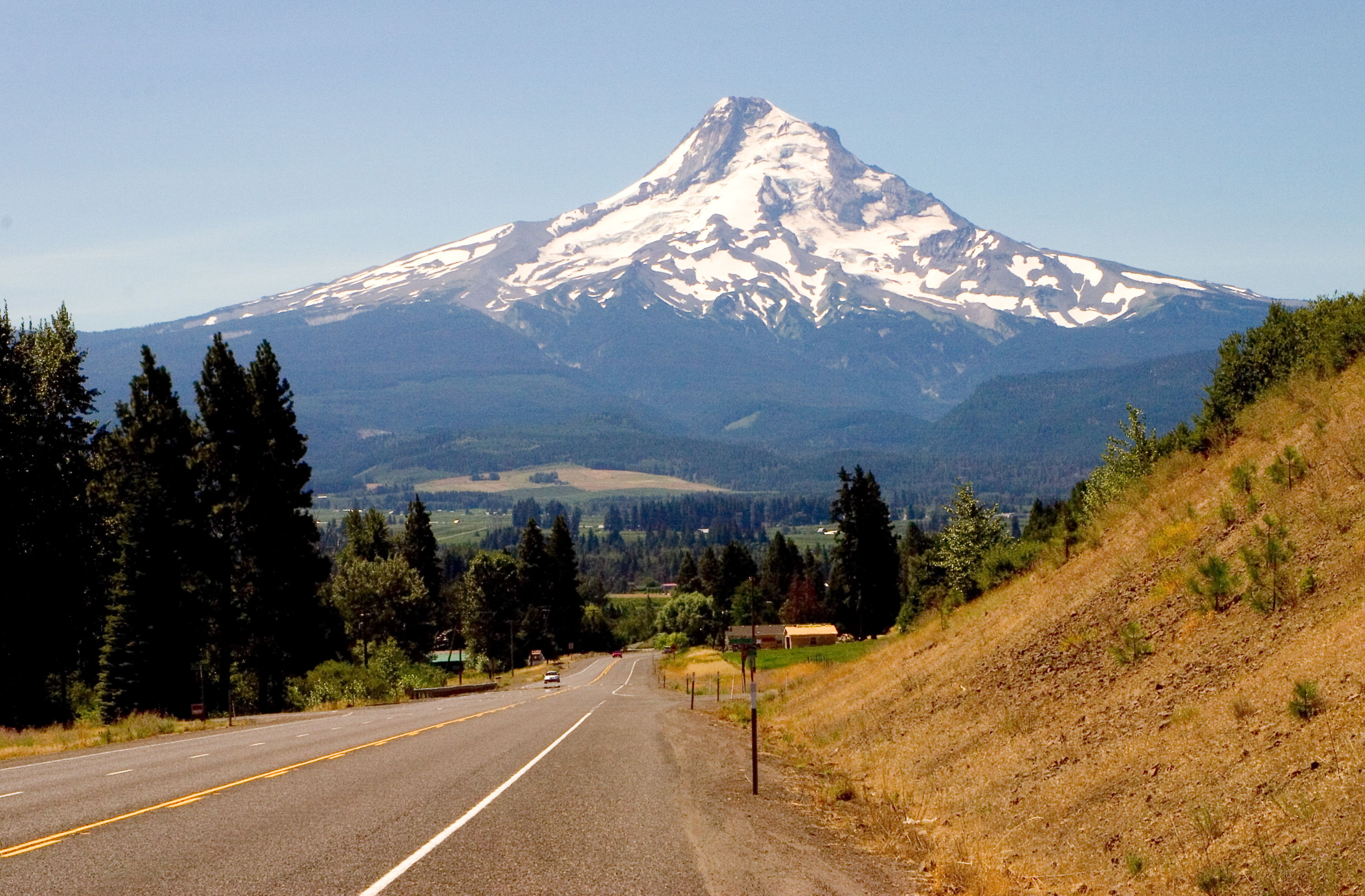
Mount Hood as seen from the Mount Hood Highway (OR 35)

== Route description ==
The highway begins in Portland at the west end of the Ross Island Bridge, with access to the Oswego Highway (Oregon Route 43), Pacific Highway (Interstate 5) and Pacific Highway West (Oregon Route 10). US 26 itself heads west on Arthur Street, which is not a state-maintained Highway, to reach the Stadium Freeway (Interstate 405).

After crossing the Willamette River on the Ross Island Bridge, the Highway is locally known as Powell Boulevard through Portland and Gresham. State maintenance ends at the Portland/Gresham border, beginning again where the Highway turns southeast at Burnside Street east of downtown Gresham. Soon after that turn, Highway 26 uses the completed part of the Mount Hood Freeway (built only to surface expressway standards) to Sandy, where it runs through downtown on a one-way couplet.

The section of Powell Boulevard from Interstate 205 east into downtown Gresham carries only two lanes. When I-205 was built, the ramps at Powell Boulevard were configured to only allow traffic towards the west, with US 26 east pointed along the four-lane Division Street, about 1/2 mile (0.80 km) to the north. (Right turns were even banned to and from the I-205 north ramps at first.) Division Street runs east into Gresham, where it meets Burnside Road, at which a right turn to the southeast leads into the Mount Hood Highway and US 26. Despite this signage pointing US 26 east on Division Street, traffic already on US 26 is pointed straight along Powell Boulevard (the Mount Hood Highway), in agreement with ODOT's route description.

East of Sandy, the highway is a (mostly) four-lane undivided highway approaching the slopes of Mount Hood; as the highway climbs up towards Government Camp it reduces to two and three lanes. It is four lanes again through Government Camp. East of Government Camp is an interchange with Oregon Route 35, where US 26 heads southeast on the Warm Springs Highway towards Madras and the Mount Hood Highway heads north with Route 35.

Route 35 winds over Bennett Pass and around the eastern side of Mount Hood, and descends into the Hood River Valley. The Mount Hood Highway designation ends at the intersection with the Historic Columbia River Highway, which carries U.S. Route 30 to the west. To the north, the road continues as a spur of the Columbia River Highway No. 2 (Interstate 84), bringing US 30 back onto that freeway. Officially Route 35 heads west from there on US 30 through Hood River to end at I-84 west of that town, but all signage ends at the end of the Mount Hood Highway.

The general public uses the name Mount Hood Highway to refer to much the same route, excluding the portions inside Portland and western Gresham (which are referred to by the street name of Powell Boulevard).

Between 1955 and 1978, the 15-mile (24 km) segment of the route through southeast Portland was proposed to be moved from Powell Boulevard to a new similar alignment known as the Mount Hood Freeway. Due to intense local opposition, this proposed freeway was cancelled.

== Scenic Byway ==
From Troutdale, the Mount Hood Scenic Byway starts at the end of the Historic Columbia River Highway where the Troutdale Bridge crosses the Sandy River. For the first twenty miles (32 km) of the route, it follows a southwestern path along city streets: west on Glenn Otto Park Road into downtown Troutdale, connecting with Halsey Street, south along 238th Street (which veers to become 242nd Street), Burnside Street, Orient Drive, Dodge Park Boulevard, Lusted Road, and Ten Eyck Road.

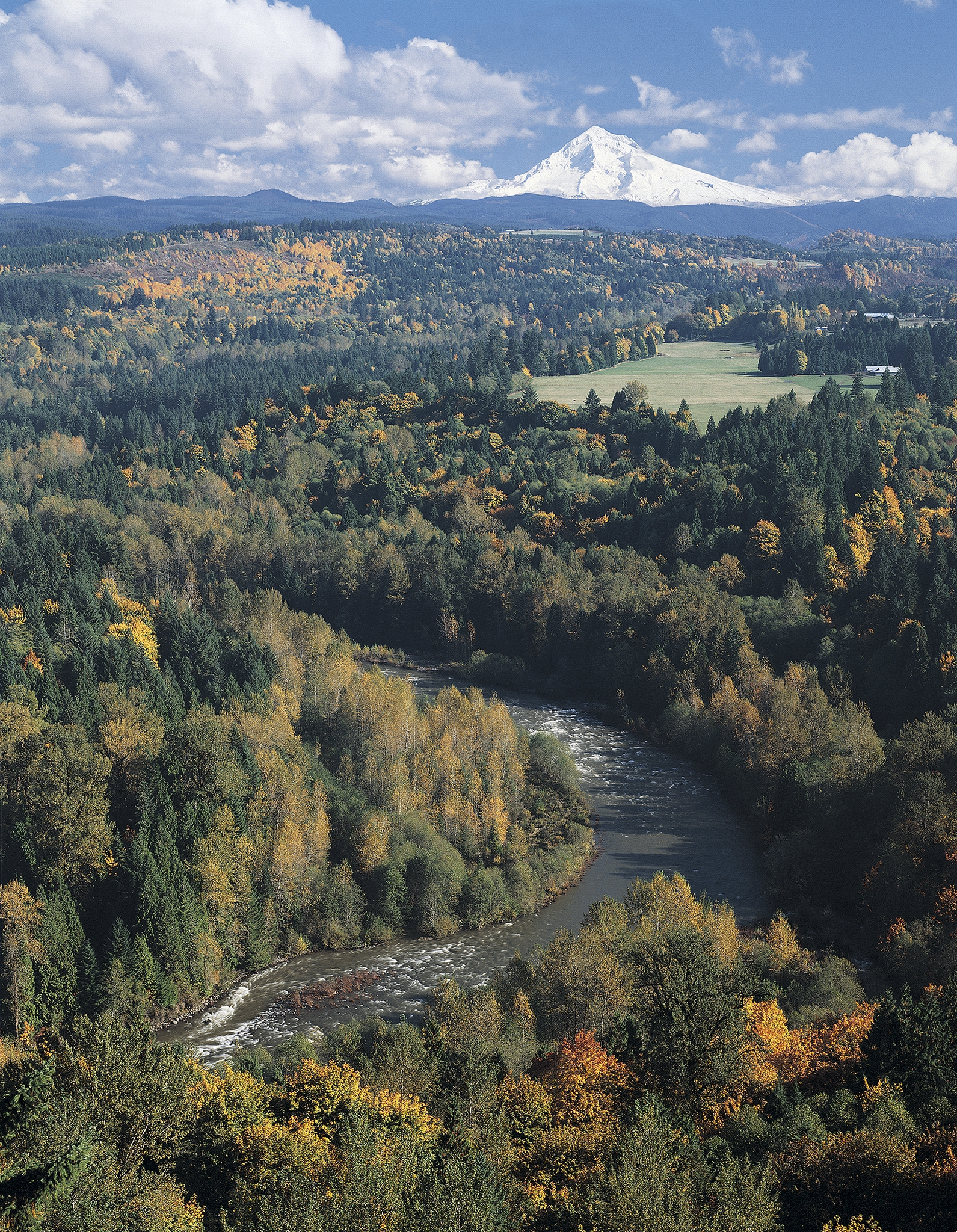
Mount Hood and the Sandy River as seen from the Jonsrud Viewpoint along the byway.

The Byway continues into Sandy on US 26, heads west briefly on a spur to Jonsrud Viewpoint on Bluff Road, then backtracks to US 26.

It continues along U.S. Route 26 for about thirty miles, then leaves the highway proper in favor of the business loop through Government Camp. The Byway follows a spur just east of Government Camp to Timberline Lodge. After returning to US 26, it continues to the junction with Oregon Route 35 where it exits US 26 and goes north on OR 35 for about 40 miles (64 km). At the eastern outskirts of Hood River, OR 35 intersects with U.S. Route 30 and the Historic Columbia River Highway.

=== Points of interest ===
From west to east:

- Sandy River: the mouth close to Troutdale is where William Robert Broughton spotted and named Mount Hood
- Portland Women's Forum State Scenic Viewpoint, also known as Chanticleer Point: views of the Columbia Gorge, Historic Columbia River Highway, Crown Point and Rooster Rock State Park
- Jonsrud Viewpoint: view of Sandy River basin and Devil's Backbone, route of the Oregon Trail and Barlow Road
- Wildwood Recreation Site - Cascade Streamwatch, Oregon: underwater stream and fish habitat viewing, five miles (8.0 km) of interpretive trails along the Salmon River, access to the Salmon-Huckleberry Wilderness via the 70-mile (110 km) Salmon River National Recreation Trail
- Lost Creek Campground: Nature Trail & Old Maid Flats
- Philip Foster Farm National Historic Site
- West Barlow Tollgate: operated from 1874 to 1919
- Laurel Hill Chute: This effectively made the Barlow Road one way by its 60% grade, easily the most harrowing portion of the Oregon Trail.
- Mount Hood Cultural Center and Museum: historic photos by Ray Atkeson in downtown Government Camp, Oregon
- Timberline Lodge and Ski Area
- Trillium Lake/Summit Meadow: a Barlow Road tollgate from 1866 through 1870
- White River Canyon: views of lahar and mud flows and evidence of frequent floods
- Barlow Pass/Pioneer Woman's Grave
- Sahalie Falls: a horsetail waterfall 100 feet (30 m) high and 20 feet (6.1 m) wide, fed by Newton Clark Glacier and a tributary of Hood River
- Tamanawas Falls: a gentle two miles (3.2 km) trail along Cold Springs Creek to 100-foot (30 m) high falls
- Toll Bridge County Park
- Panorama Point County Park and Viewpoint
- Jesse and Winifred Hutson Museum: a National Historic Site in Parkdale, Oregon
- Mount Hood Railroad
- Historic Downtown Hood River

== Major intersections ==
County	Location	mi	km	Destinations	Notes
Multnomah	Portland	−0.10	−0.16	US 26 west / OR 10 / OR 99W (Naito Parkway) to Barbur Boulevard	Western end of US 26 overlap
Multnomah	Portland	0.16	0.26	I-5 south / OR 43 – Lake Oswego, Salem	Westbound exit and eastbound entrance only
Multnomah	Portland	0.30– 1.00	0.48– 1.61	Ross Island Bridge over the Willamette River	
Multnomah	Portland	1.01	1.63	OR 99E (Grand Avenue)	Eastbound exit and entrance only
Multnomah	Portland	1.20	1.93	SE 9th Avenue to OR 99E	Signed westbound only
Multnomah	Portland	1.60	2.57	SE 17th Avenue to OR 99E	Eastbound exit and westbound entrance only
Multnomah	Portland	5.04	8.11	OR 213 (SE 82nd Avenue)	
Multnomah	Portland	5.69	9.16	I-205 – Salem, Seattle	
Clackamas	Boring	19.39	31.21	OR 212 – Boring, Oregon City	
Clackamas	Sandy	24.24	39.01	OR 211 – Estacada, Molalla	
Clackamas	Government Camp	53.99	86.89	OR 173 – Timberline Lodge	
Clackamas		55.87– 56.48	89.91– 90.90	US 26 east / OR 35 begins – Madras, Bend	Eastern end of US 26 overlap; southern end of OR 35 overlap
Clackamas–Hood River county line		58.34	93.89	Skyline Trail	
Hood River		58.45	94.07	Barlow Pass summit, elevation 4,161 feet (1,268 m)	
Hood River		62.43	100.47	Bennett Pass summit, elevation 4,647 feet (1,416 m)	
Hood River		62.47	100.54	Mount Hood Meadows Ski Resort, Bennett Pass Sno-Park	Interchange
Hood River	Mount Hood	83.66	134.64	OR 281 north – Parkdale, Cooper Spur	
Hood River		88.20	141.94	Scenic viewpoint	
Hood River		90.38	145.45	OR 282 west – Odell	
Hood River	Hood River	96.74	155.69	OR 35 ends / US 30 (Historic Columbia River Highway State Trail) to I-84 – Hood River, Portland	
1.000 mi = 1.609 km; 1.000 km = 0.621 mi: Concurrency terminus; Incomplete access
