= Oregon Route 35 =

State highway in northern Oregon, US

Oregon Route 35
- Route 35 highlighted in red signed route in pink unsigned legal route in dark red

Route information
- Maintained by ODOT
- Length: 41.54 mi (66.85 km)
- Component highways: Mt. Hood Highway No. 26; Historic Columbia River Highway No. 100

Major junctions
- South end: US 26 near Government Camp
- US 30 near Hood River
- North end: I-84 / US 30 in Hood River

Location
- Country: United States
- State: Oregon
- Counties: Clackamas, Hood River

Highway system
- Oregon Highways; Interstate; US; State; Named; Scenic
| ← OR 34 | → OR 36 |
| ← SR 31 | → SR 41 |

Oregon Route 35 is a state highway in the U.S. state of Oregon, running between Government Camp on the slopes of Mount Hood and the city of Hood River. OR 35 traverses part of the Mt. Hood Highway No. 26 (Mount Hood Scenic Byway) and part of the Historic Columbia River Highway No. 100 of the Oregon state highway system. Along the Historic Columbia River Highway in Hood River, the route is concurrent with U.S. Route 30.

== Route description ==
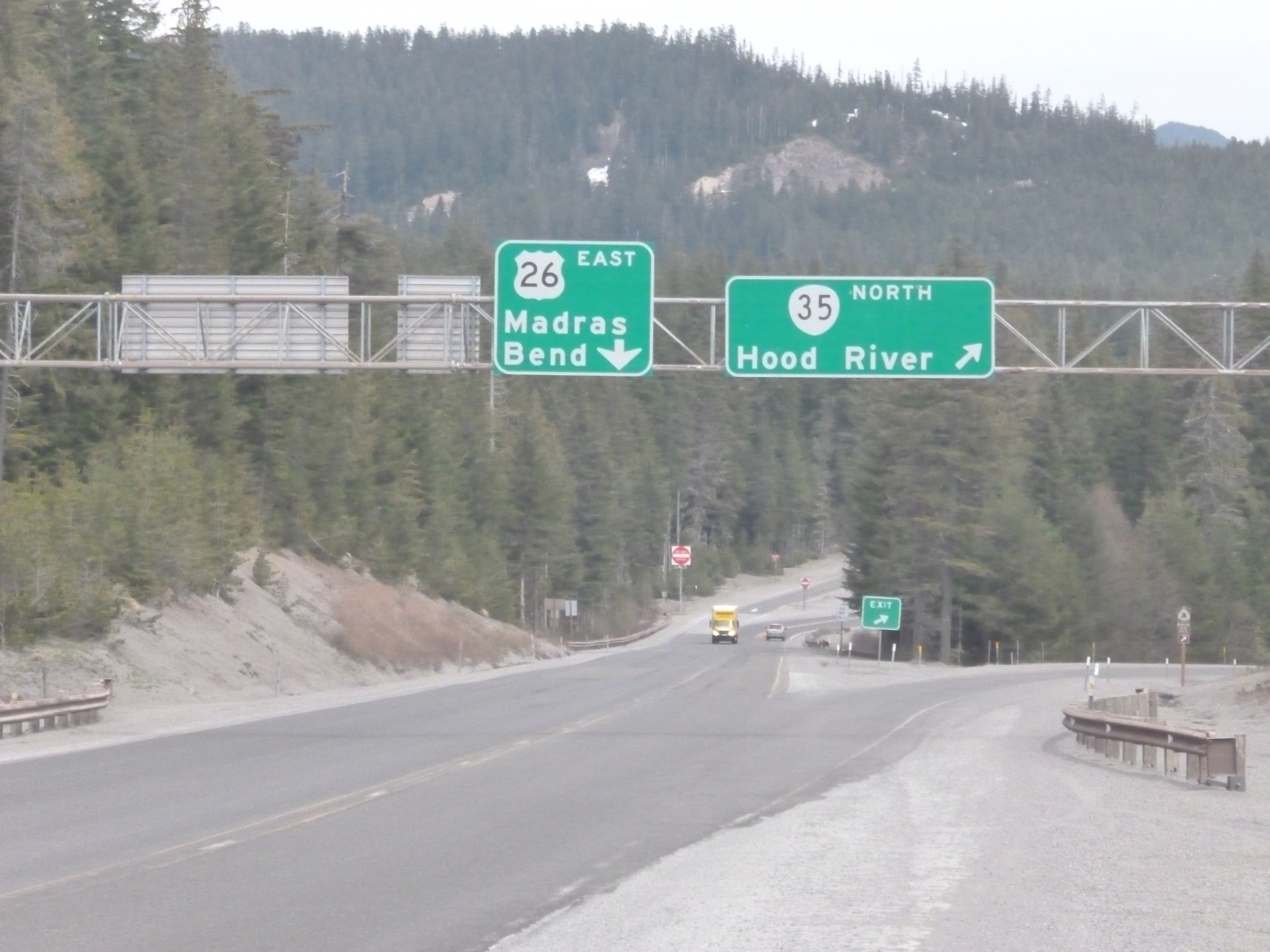
Southern terminus at US 26

Oregon 35 starts a few miles east of Government Camp, at an interchange with U.S. 26. It then winds around the southeastern side of the mountain, providing access to several ski resorts, snow-parks, hiking trails, campgrounds, and other recreational facilities. After rounding the eastern slope of the mountain, the highway descends into the Hood River valley, a farming community famous for its produce, in particular, apples and cherries. In the valley the route passes through the communities of Mount Hood, Lenz and Pine Grove.

At the bottom of the valley lies the city of Hood River, popular for windsurfing because of the high winds often present in the Columbia River Gorge. OR 35 provides access to the downtown core, via a sparsely signed concurrency with U.S. Route 30. OR 35 ends at an interchange with Interstate 84 at exit 62.

Contrary to its legal definition, the shield signs for South Oregon 35 in Hood River are posted on Button Bridge Road beginning at I-84 exit 64 just south of the Hood River Bridge over the Columbia River near Washington State Route 14.

== History ==
Timeline of washouts since 1907

=== Washington State Route 35 ===
In 1997, Washington proposed a new or improved transportation crossing of the Columbia River to connect Washington State Route 14 with Oregon Route 35 along with I-84. It designated this crossing "State Route 35" and publicly announced a plan to prepare an Environmental Impact Statement about the proposal in early 2001. A feasibility study for the SR-35 Columbia River Crossing was completed in September 2004. Due to costs, no further progress has been made on the proposal; instead, the Port of Hood River spent $8 million of its Bridge Repair and Replacement Fund on replacing the bridge's steel deck, underlying stringers and guardrails. Washington's stub segment SR 35 was legally designated but never signed.

In contrast, though Oregon didn't change its legal definition for Oregon Route 35, all signage for Southbound OR 35 makes it appear as if it runs up Button Bridge Road from near base of the bridge to where the route officially turns east into downtown Hood River.

=== History of washouts ===
OR 35 has had a history of washouts dating back to August 1907, with 20 closures due to washouts, five of which have occurred since September 1998.

The most recent closure took place on November 7, 2006, involving a section of the highway from milepost 57 to milepost 80. As in the past, the closure was caused by overflow of the White River and the build-up of debris in the White River Canyon which subsequently flows down and overwhelms the highway. This washout, the worst in memory, cut off access to Mount Hood Meadows in both directions, moved the White River course north and east to the bed of Green Apple Creek, and buried—sometimes 20–30 feet deep—two recreational parking lots, miles of cross-country skiing and hiking trails, and several small Forest Service roads.

Repair work was anticipated to be completed by December 15, 2006. The route was reopened December 9, a week ahead of schedule.

== Major intersections ==
Milepoints are as reported by ODOT and do not necessarily reflect current mileage. Z indicates overlapping mileage due to construction longer than established route, and – indicates negative mileage behind established beginning point. Segments that are locally maintained may be omitted. For routes traversing multiple named state highways, each milepoint is preceded by the corresponding state highway number.

| County | Location | Milepoint | Destinations | Notes |
|---|---|---|---|---|
| Clackamas | | 26 57.20 | US 26 west – Portland US 26 east – Madras, Bend | Interchange |
| Clackamas–Hood River county line | | 26 59.67 | Skyline Trail | |
| Hood River | | 26 59.78 | Barlow Pass summit, elevation 4,161 feet (1,268 m) | |
| Hood River | | 26 61.71 | White River | |
| Hood River | | 26 63.76 | Bennett Pass summit, elevation 4,647 feet (1,416 m) | |
| Hood River | | 26 63.80 | Mount Hood Meadows Ski Resort, Bennett Pass Sno-Park | Interchange |
| Hood River | | 26 68.23 | East Fork Hood River | |
| Hood River | | 26 73.26 | East Fork Hood River | |
| Hood River | | 26 77.65 | East Fork Hood River | |
| Hood River | Mount Hood | 26 85.02 | OR 281 north – Parkdale, Cooper Spur | |
| Hood River | | 26 92.33 | Viewpoint | |
| Hood River | | 26 95.25 | OR 282 west – Odell | |
| Hood River | | 26 101.82 100 51.26 | US 30 east to I-84 / Historic Columbia River Highway State Trail – Portland | Southern end of silent concurrency with US 30 |
| Hood River | | 100 51.10 | Hood River | |
| Hood River | Hood River | 100 50.12 | OR 281 (13th Street) | |
| Hood River | Hood River | 100 48.91– 100 48.66 | I-84 / US 30 west – The Dalles, Portland | Northern end of silent concurrency with US 30 |
1.000 mi = 1.609 km; 1.000 km = 0.621 mi: Concurrency terminus
