= Hood River Valley =

River basin in Oregon, US

Coordinates: 45.6°N 121.6°W

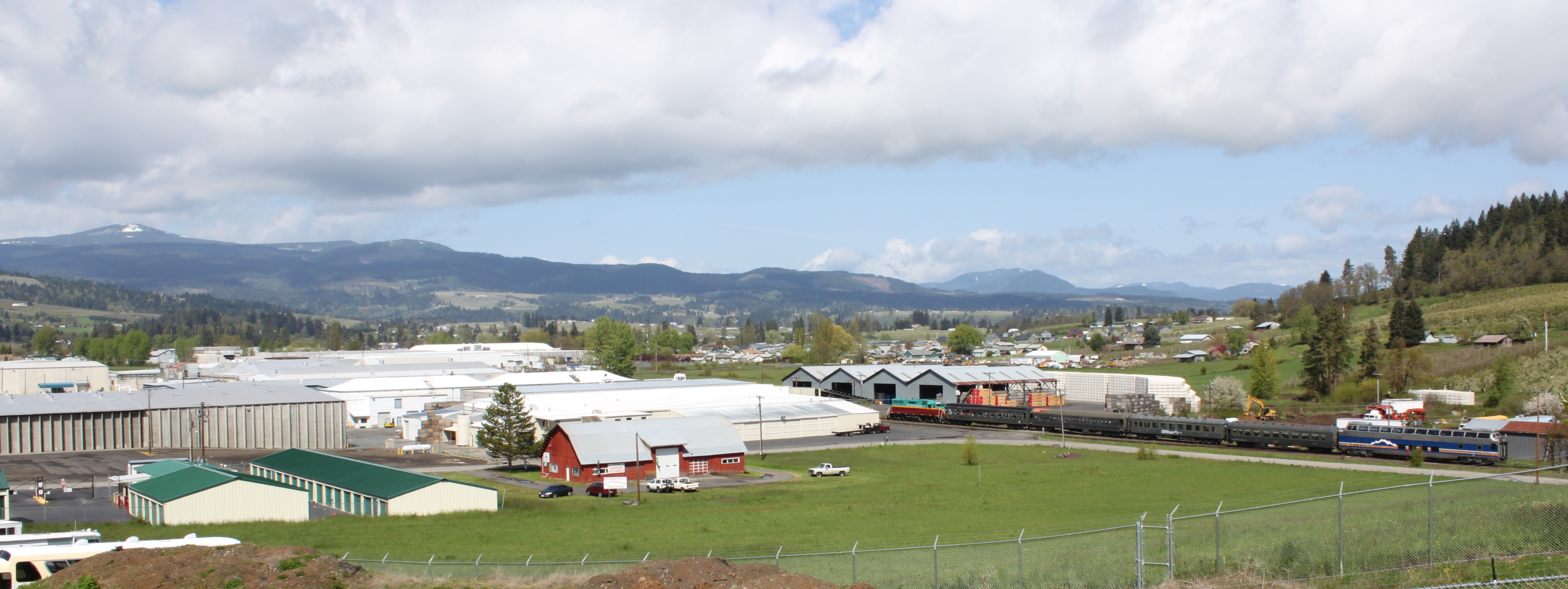
The community of Odell and the Hood River Valley

Hood River Valley is the river basin of Hood River in northern Oregon, U.S. It is bounded by the Columbia River to the north, Mount Hood to the south, the Cascade Range crest to the west and an apparently unnamed ridge system to the east which contains Hood River Mountain and Snyder Canyon. Mount Hood National Forest surrounds the Hood River Valley west, south, and east. It is entirely contained in Hood River County.

The only city in the valley is Hood River. The major unincorporated communities are Odell, Parkdale, Mount Hood, and Dee.

The valley is known for its tree fruit agriculture—including one of the world's largest pear growing areas—farm tourism, and recreation related to its evergreen forested mountains providing opportunities such as hiking, mountain biking, whitewater sports, camping, and 31 fishing lakes. On the Columbia River is one of the top rated water sports areas in the world, particularly for kite boarding and wind surfing. On Mount Hood, snow sports draw thousands daily primarily at Mount Hood Meadows, but also Cooper Spur ski area on the east side of Mount Hood. Alpine hiking and mountain climbing are popular as well.

== See also ==
- Willamette Valley
