= Oregon Route 282 =

State highway in Hood River County, Oregon, US

Oregon Route 282
- Route 282 highlighted in red

Route information
- Maintained by ODOT
- Length: 3.45 mi (5.55 km)
- Existed: 2002–present

Major junctions
- East end: OR 281 near Odell
- West end: OR 35 near Odell

Location
- Country: United States
- State: Oregon
- County: Hood River

Highway system
- Oregon Highways; Interstate; US; State; Named; Scenic
← OR 281	→ OR 293

Oregon Route 282 is a state highway running from OR 281 north of Odell to OR 35 east of Odell within the U.S. state of Oregon. OR 282 is known as the Odell Highway No. 282 (see Oregon highways and routes). It is 3.45 miles (5.55 km) long and runs northwest to southeast (signed west and east), entirely within Hood River County.

OR 282 was established in 2002 as part of Oregon's project to assign route numbers to highways that previously were not assigned.

== Route description ==
OR 282 begins at an intersection with OR 281 five miles (8 km) south of Hood River and heads south approximately 2 1/2 miles to Odell. At Odell, OR 282 turns east and continues approximately one mile to an intersection with OR 35 where it ends.

== History ==
OR 282 was assigned to the Odell Highway in 2002.

== Major intersections ==
The entire route is in Odell, Hood River County.

mi	km	Destinations	Notes
0.00	0.00	OR 281 – Hood River, Dee, Parkdale	
3.45	5.55	OR 35 – Hood River, Mount Hood, Parkdale	
1.000 mi = 1.609 km; 1.000 km = 0.621 mi
