= Lenz, Hood River County, Oregon =

Unincorporated community in the state of Oregon, United States

Coordinates: 45°37′46″N 121°31′27″W

Lenz is an unincorporated community in Hood River County, Oregon, United States just west of Oregon Route 35 about a mile and a half east of Odell. This station on the Mount Hood Railroad was named after John Lenz, an early settler. Lenz Butte and Lenz Creek are nearby. The name of the station has also been spelled Lentz and was also known as "Sherman Spur". The elevation is 732 feet (223 m).
