= Bloucher, Oregon =

Unincorporated community in the state of Oregon, United States

Coordinates: 45.631229°N 121.598963°W

Bloucher is an unincorporated historic community west of Odell in Hood River County, Oregon, United States.

Bloucher was a station on the Mount Hood Railroad named for local resident H. E. Bloucher. It was also known as Bloucher Spur.
