= U.S. Route 30 in Oregon =

Section of U.S. numbered route in Oregon

U.S. Highway 30
- US 30 highlighted in red

Route information
- Maintained by ODOT
- Length: 477.02 mi (767.69 km) (using the entire Huntington Highway through Lime)
- Tourist routes: Lewis and Clark Trail

Major junctions
- West end: US 101 in Astoria
- I-405 in Portland; I-5 in Portland; I-205 in Portland; I-84 from Hood River to Ontario; US 197 in The Dalles; US 97 in Biggs Junction; I-82 near Hermiston; US 395 in Pendleton
- East end: US 30 at the Idaho state line

Location
- Country: United States
- State: Oregon
- Counties: Clatsop, Columbia, Multnomah, Hood River, Wasco, Sherman, Gilliam, Morrow, Umatilla, Union, Baker, Malheur

Highway system
- United States Numbered Highway System; List; Special; Divided; Oregon Highways; Interstate; US; State; Named; Scenic
← OR 27	→ OR 31

U.S. Route 30 (US 30) in the U.S. state of Oregon is a major east–west United States Numbered Highway that runs from its western terminus in Astoria to the Idaho border east of Ontario. West of Portland, US 30 generally follows the southern shore of the Columbia River; east of Portland, the highway has largely been replaced with Interstate 84 (I-84), though it is signed all the way across the state, and diverges from the I-84 mainline in several towns as a de facto business route. (The state of Oregon does not sign Interstate business routes; instead, it uses the designations US 30 and Oregon Route 99 [OR 99; along the I-5 corridor] for this purpose.) At 477.02 miles (767.69 km), it is also the longest road in the state.

== Route description ==
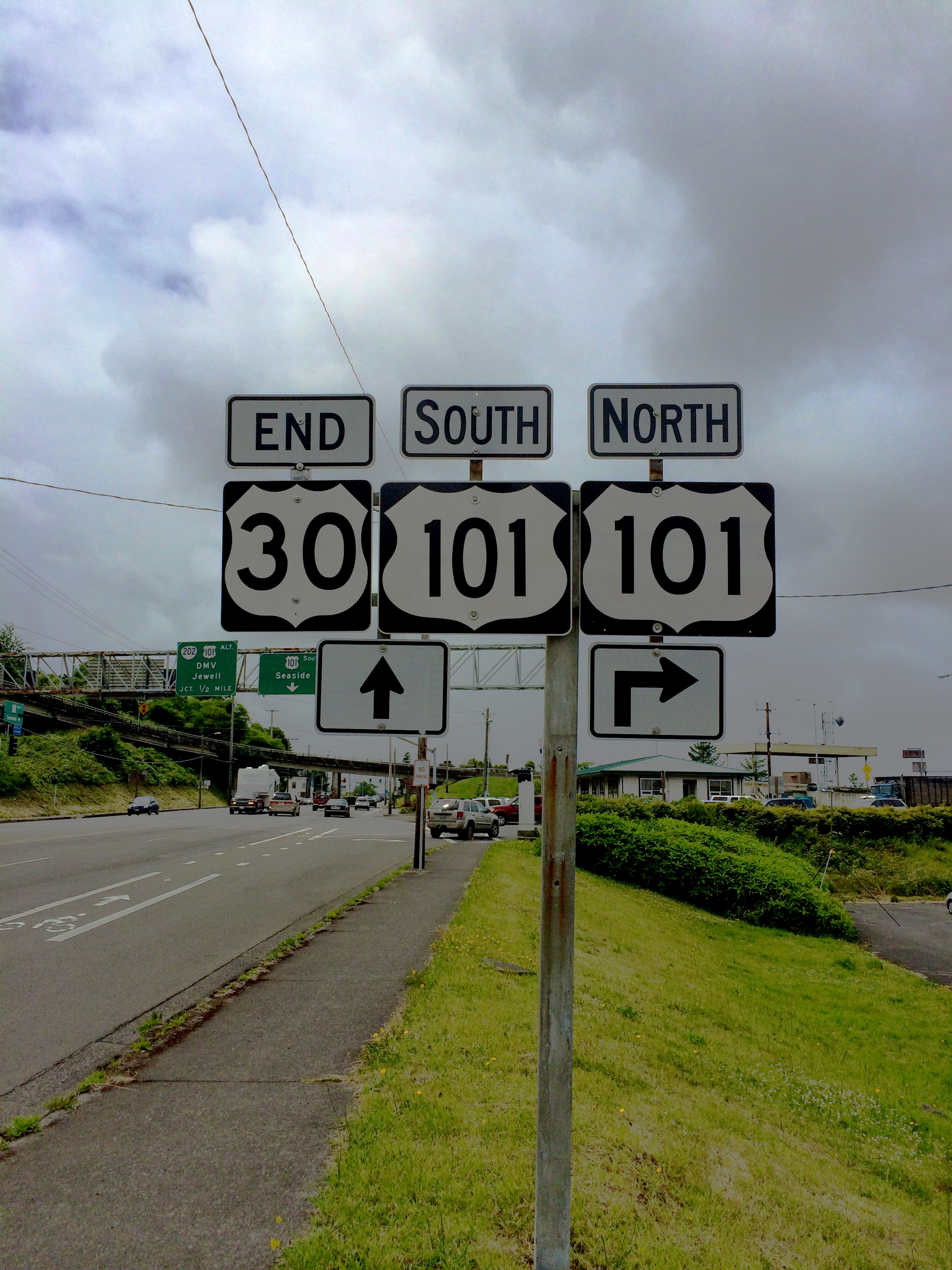
End US 30 marker, Astoria

=== Astoria to Portland ===
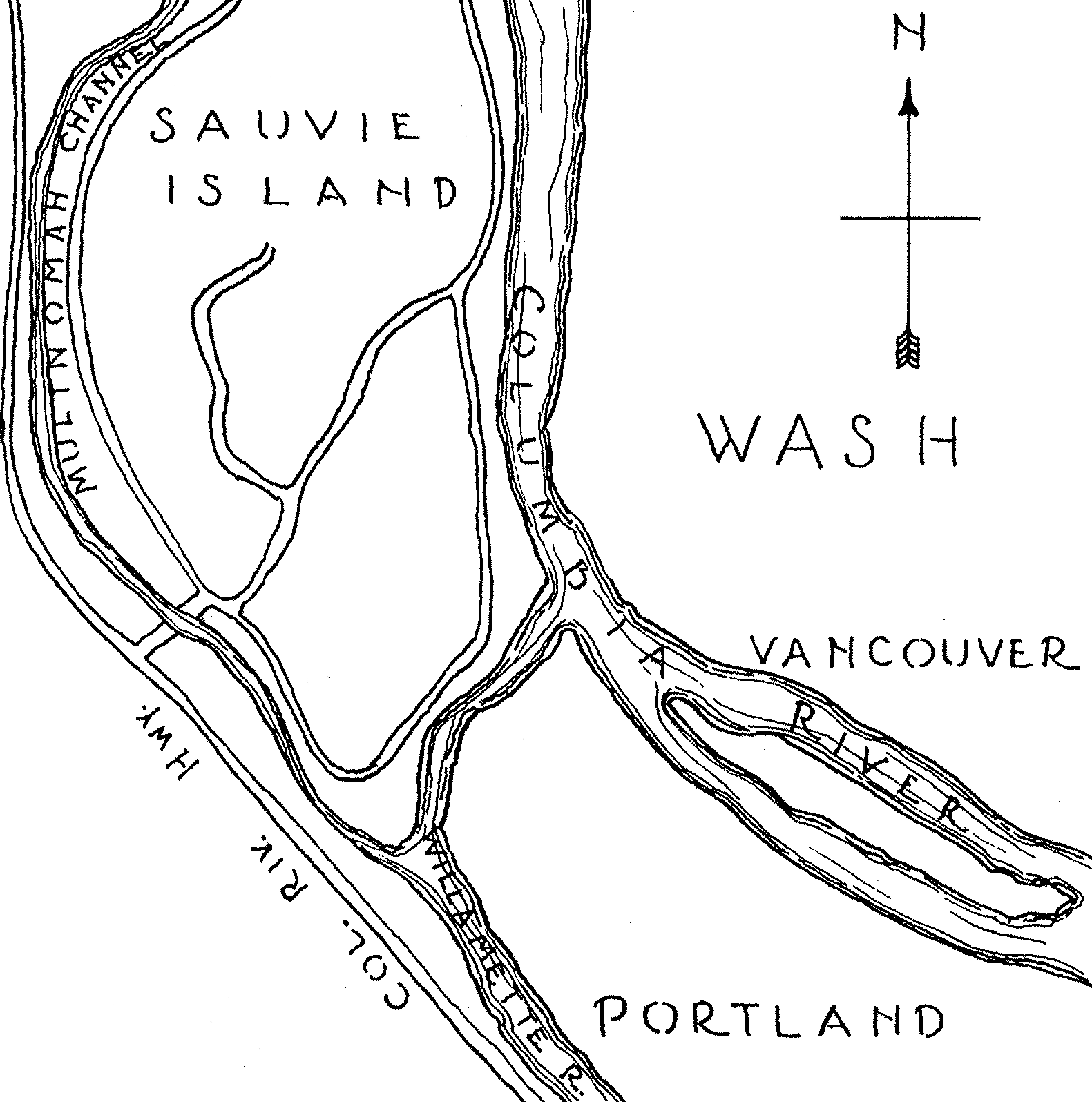
1937 sketch including Columbia River Highway (now US 30) as it passes west of Sauvie Island, northwest of Portland

US 30 begins in Astoria, at an intersection with US 101. US 101 southbound from the intersection goes down the length of the Oregon Coast while northbound US 101 crosses the Astoria–Megler Bridge into Washington. US 30 proceeds east through the intersection, through downtown Astoria, and then along the southern bank of the Columbia River.

East of Astoria, US 30 is known as the Lower Columbia River Highway No. 2W, a designation which it carries until Portland.

Between Astoria and Portland, the highway passes through (or by) numerous Columbia River towns, such as Svensen, Knappa, Wauna, and Westport. In Westport, one can use the Wahkiakum County ferry to cross the Columbia River to Puget Island and Cathlamet, Washington.

Continuing east, the highway passes through the communities of Woodson and Clatskanie. East of Clatskanie, the highway runs inland from the river a bit, approaching the town of Rainier.

Just before Rainier is an interchange providing access to the Lewis and Clark Bridge, which crosses the Columbia River to Longview, Washington. After Rainier, the highway turns south, following a bend in the river, and runs parallel to I-5 (which is across the river on the Washington side). Towns along the way include Goble, Deer Island, Columbia City, and St. Helens.

South of Deer Island, US 30 becomes an expressway, known locally as St. Helens Road. The highway proceeds through the towns of Warren, Scappoose, and Burlington (as well as passing by the access road to Sauvie Island) before entering Portland. East of Scappoose is the confluence of the Columbia and Willamette rivers.

=== Portland area ===
In northwest Portland, US 30 is sandwiched between Forest Park to the west and the Willamette River to the east. South of the Linnton area, US 30 Bypass (US 30 Byp.; Northeast Portland Highway No. 123) heads east across the St. Johns Bridge. US 30 continues south along St. Helens Road and then later on Yeon Avenue through an industrial area as it approaches Downtown Portland. On the edge of Downtown Portland, US 30 briefly becomes a freeway, utilizing part of the route of the canceled I-505, until its interchange with I-405 at the western end of the Fremont Bridge.

US 30 crosses the Fremont Bridge (along with I-405) on the Stadium Freeway No. 61; at the eastern end of the bridge, it joins I-5 south for approximately one mile (1.6 km) on the Pacific Highway No. 1 and then joins the Banfield Expressway (I-84), where it becomes the Columbia River Highway No. 2. For the remainder of its route in the Portland area, US 30 shares an alignment with I-84. I-84 passes through the eastern Portland suburbs of Fairview, Wood Village, Gresham, and Troutdale in this fashion. US 30 Byp. rejoins US 30 in Wood Village.

US 30 Business (US 30 Bus.) was a spur from US 30 Byp. northeast of Downtown Portland, across I-84/US 30 to OR 99E east of Downtown Portland, just east of the Burnside Bridge. It has not rejoined US 30 on its west end since US 30 was moved onto I-405 and I-5 around Downtown Portland.

=== East of Portland ===
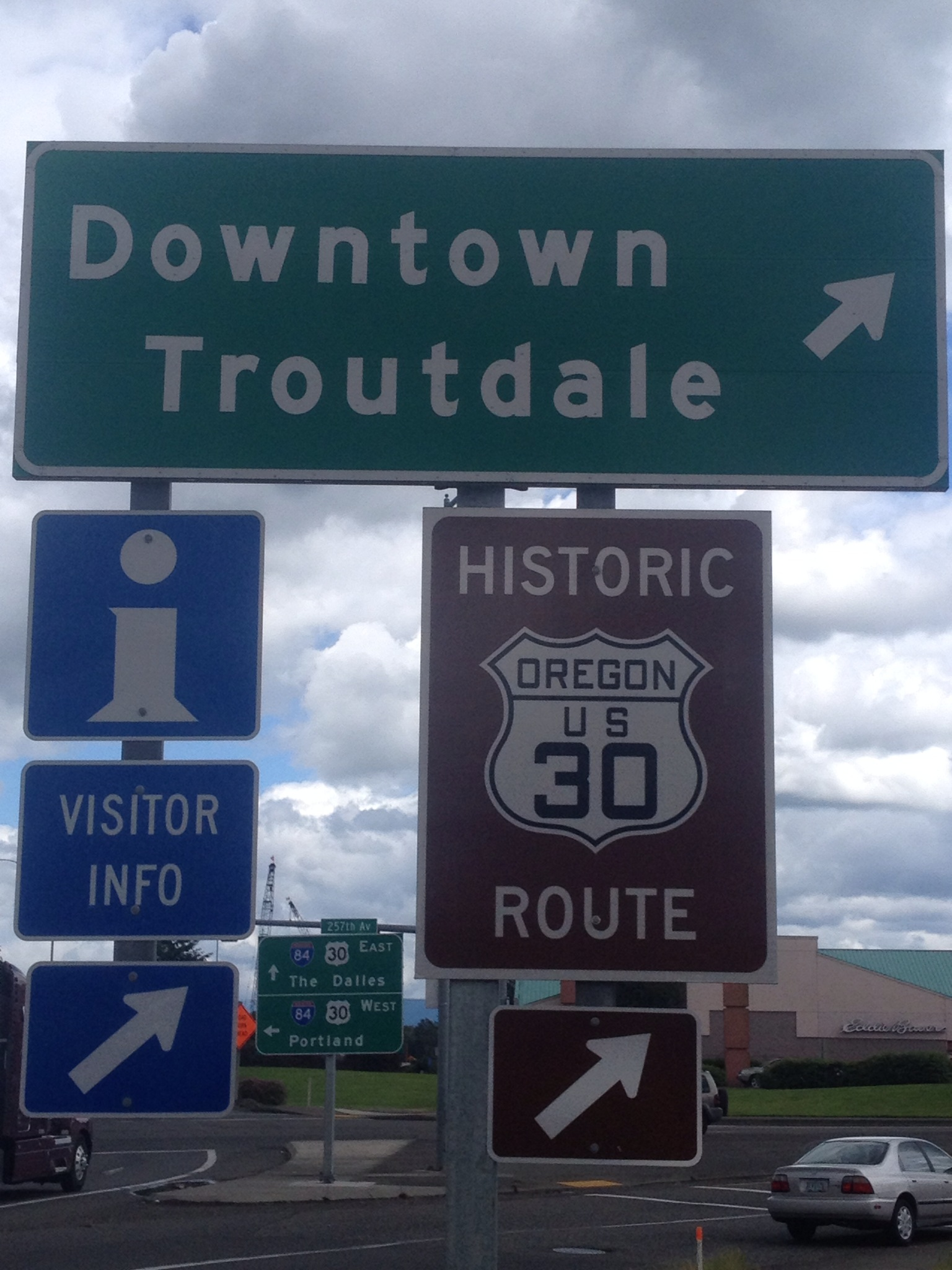
Historic US 30 sign

US 30 runs mostly along I-84 in Oregon east of Portland, diverting to short segments of the old surface route to act as a business or scenic route for I-84:

- Historic Columbia River Highway No. 100 for one mile (1.6 km) through Cascade Locks (also designated the Cascade Locks Highway)
- Mount Hood Highway No. 26 for three miles (4.8 km) through Hood River
- Historic Columbia River Highway No. 100 and Mosier-The Dalles Highway No. 292 for 20 miles (32 km) from Mosier to The Dalles
- Pendleton Highway No. 67 for seven miles (11 km) through Pendleton
- La Grande-Baker Highway No. 66 for five miles (8.0 km) through La Grande
- La Grande-Baker Highway No. 66 for 22 miles (35 km) from North Powder to Baker City
- Huntington Highway No. 449 for eight miles (13 km) through Huntington
- Ontario Spur No. 493 for one mile (1.6 km) from Ontario to the Idaho state line

The sections concurrent with I-84 are part of the Columbia River Highway No. 2 west of US 730 at Boardman and part of the Old Oregon Trail Highway No. 6 east of US 730.

There is also a US 30 Bus. signed in the Ontario area. This is part of the Olds Ferry-Ontario Highway No. 455.

== History ==
Interstate 505
- Location: Portland
- Length: 3.17 mi (5.10 km)

Sections of the highway between The Dalles and Ontario generally follow the route of the Oregon Trail, which was used in the 19th century by U.S. settlers to reach the Willamette Valley. US 30 was created as part of the initial U.S. Numbered Highway System adopted by the American Association of State Highway Officials on November 11, 1926. The number was assigned in place of US 20, which had originally been planned for the corridor in Oregon, after objections from the state government. The new national highway incorporated portions of existing state roads, including the Historic Columbia River Highway, which was constructed between 1913 and 1922 through the Columbia River Gorge.

Before the Banfield Expressway was built, the Portland section of US 30 ran on St. Helens Road to the Willamette Heights section of Portland, then on Wardway Street, then Vaughn Street, then Northwest 18th & 19th avenues, then Burnside Street, and then Sandy Boulevard toward Troutdale. Several sections of the old highway use brown road markers with "Historic US 30" that were installed in the 21st century. The Interstate Highway System, approved by the federal government in 1956, included construction of a freeway in Oregon along the US 30 corridor between Portland and Ontario; it was later numbered I-80N (now I-84). The Oregon state government unsuccessfully proposed an extension to cover the rest of US 30 between Astoria and Portland in the 1950s and 1960s, which was two lanes wide and in need of funding for improvements.

The 104-mile (167 km) Astoria–Portland section had been rebuilt with fewer curves by the 1960s but remained congested due to its use as a tourist route as well as a bypass of US 99 (and I-5) upon the removal of tolls from the Lewis and Clark Bridge near Longview, Washington. In 1969, the state government announced plans to widen the highway between Burlington and the Columbia County border but declined to fund further projects in favor of improvements in the Portland area. The state later withdrew its proposals to upgrade the entire section to an expressway, stating that US 30 was meant to serve local traffic and could be improved to a four-lane highway instead. A project to widen US 30 near Scappoose and Warren in the 1970s was delayed by a decade due to disagreements between the state and local governments over its routing and an attempt to build a full bypass. The highway remained slightly more accident-prone than others in Oregon; from 1987 to 1992, a total of 22 crashes on 50 miles (80 km) of US 30 in Columbia County resulted in 26 deaths and 769 injuries.

In 1988, US 30 was realigned along Northwest Yeon Avenue in Portland to alleviate residential congestion. The new route utilized an interchange with I-405 that was intended for a proposed I-505. The proposed Interstate was intended to be a 3.17-mile (5.10 km) freeway spur in northwest Portland that would have connected I-405 to St. Helens Road, the latter being the original route for US 30. Funding for the freeway was withdrawn by the city government in November 1978, as it would have required condemnation and rerouting streets on a swath of land through the Northwest Industrial neighborhood. The federal government formally approved the project's cancelation in December 1979 and reallocated funds to other transportation improvements in the area.

In 2021, the city of Scappoose proposed the construction of a bypass to carry US 30 around the city. A similar proposal was defeated in 1971 following protests from residents over its disruption to future potential development. The $5.5-million (equivalent to $32.5 million in 2024) allocation for the bypass project was redistributed by the state to improve other sections of US 30 in Columbia County.

== Major intersections ==
County	Location	mi	km	Exit	Destinations	Notes
Clatsop	Astoria	0.00	0.00		US 101 / Lewis and Clark Trail to US 26 – Seaside, Ilwaco, Long Beach	
Clatsop	Westport	26.81	43.15		Westport Ferry Road – Wahkiakum County Ferry	
Columbia	Clatskanie	35.77	57.57		OR 47 south – Mist, Vernonia, Jewell	
Columbia	Rainier	47.72	76.80		Longview, Seattle (via Lewis and Clark Bridge)	Interchange
Columbia	St. Helens				US 30 Bus.	
Columbia	St. Helens				US 30 Bus.	
Multnomah		83.2	133.9		OR 127 (Cornelius Pass Road)	
Multnomah	Portland	89.34	143.78		US 30 Byp. east (St. Johns Bridge) / Lewis and Clark Trail	
Multnomah	Portland	93.91	151.13		Nicolai Street – Montgomery Park	
Multnomah	Portland	93.91	151.13	Western end of freeway		
Multnomah	Portland	94.19	151.58		Vaughn Street	Westbound exit and eastbound entrance
Multnomah	Portland	94.52– 94.81	152.12– 152.58		I-405 south to US 26 – Portland City Center, Beaverton, Salem	Western end of I-405 overlap
Multnomah	Portland	95.05	152.97	Fremont Bridge over the Willamette River		
Multnomah	Portland	95.30	153.37		Kerby Avenue	Eastbound exit and westbound entrance
Multnomah	Portland	95.30– 95.73	153.37– 154.06		I-5 north – Seattle	Eastern end of I-405 overlap; western end of I-5 overlap
Multnomah	Portland	96.29	154.96	302A	Broadway, Weidler Street – Rose Quarter, Portland City Center	
Multnomah	Portland	96.60	155.46		Oregon Convention Center, Rose Quarter	Westbound exit only
Multnomah	Portland	96.73	155.67		I-5 south – Beaverton, Salem, Portland City Center	Eastern end of I-5 overlap; western end of I-84 overlap
Multnomah	Portland	97.19	156.41		OR 99E	Eastbound entrance only
Multnomah	Portland	97.65	157.15	1	Lloyd Center	Westbound exit and eastbound entrance
Multnomah	Portland	98.89	159.15	1	33rd Avenue	Eastbound exit and westbound entrance
Multnomah	Portland	99.28	159.78	2	César E Chávez Boulevard, 43rd Avenue	Former US 30 Bus.
Multnomah	Portland	100.42	161.61	3	58th Avenue	Eastbound exit and westbound entrance
Multnomah	Portland	100.99	162.53	4	Halsey Street, 68th Avenue	Eastbound exit only
Multnomah	Portland	101.74	163.73	5	OR 213 (82nd Avenue)	Eastbound exit and westbound entrance
Multnomah	Portland	102.49	164.94	6	I-205 south – Salem	Eastbound exit and westbound entrance
Multnomah	Portland	102.59	165.10	7	Halsey Street – Gateway District	Eastbound exit only
Multnomah	Portland	103.32	166.28	8	I-205 north / Lewis and Clark Trail – Seattle, Portland Airport	Eastbound exit and westbound entrance
Multnomah	Portland	103.47	166.52	9	102nd Avenue – Parkrose	Eastbound exit and westbound entrance
Multnomah		103.83	167.10	9	I-205 – Seattle, Salem	Westbound exit and eastbound entrance
Multnomah	Fairview	108.81	175.11	14	Fairview Parkway (to US 30 Byp. west)	
Multnomah	Dodson	129.54	208.47	35	Historic Columbia River Highway west – Ainsworth State Park	
Hood River	Cascade Locks	137.78	221.74		I-84 east – The Dalles	Eastbound exit and westbound entrance; eastern end of I-84 overlap
Hood River	Cascade Locks	138.24	222.48		Bridge of the Gods – Stevenson	
Hood River	Cascade Locks	139.06	223.80		Forest Lane (Historic Columbia River Highway east)	
Hood River	Cascade Locks	139.89	225.13		I-84 west – Portland	Westbound exit and eastbound entrance; western end of I-84 overlap
Hood River	Cascade Locks	141.87	228.32	47	Forest Lane (Historic Columbia River Highway west) – Herman Creek	Westbound exit and eastbound entrance
Hood River	Hood River	156.37	251.65		I-84 east / Lewis and Clark Trail – The Dalles	Eastern end of I-84 overlap
Hood River	Hood River	157.81	253.97		13th Street (OR 281)	
Hood River		158.95	255.81		OR 35 / Historic Columbia River Highway State Trail east – Odell, Parkdale, Mount Hood	
Hood River	Hood River	159.27– 159.53	256.32– 256.74		I-84 west / Lewis and Clark Trail / Hood River Bridge – Portland, Bingen, White Salmon	Western end of I-84 overlap
Wasco	Mosier	164.47	264.69		I-84 east / Lewis and Clark Trail – The Dalles	Eastern end of I-84 overlap
Wasco	Mosier	164.84	265.28		Historic Columbia River Highway State Trail west	
Wasco	Rowena	173.83	279.75		To I-84 – The Dalles, Hood River, Mayer State Park	
Wasco		176.55	284.13		To I-84 – Port of The Dalles	
Wasco	The Dalles	181.19	291.60		I-84 / Lewis and Clark Trail – Pendleton, Portland, Port of The Dalles	Interchange
Wasco	The Dalles	183.16	294.77		To I-84	Interchange
Wasco	The Dalles	184.66	297.18		US 197 south – Dufur, Bend	Western end of US 197 overlap
Wasco	The Dalles	184.90– 185.15	297.57– 297.97		I-84 west / US 197 north / Lewis and Clark Trail – The Dalles, Portland, Yakima	Eastern end of US 197 overlap; west end of I-84 overlap
Wasco		195.06	313.92	97	OR 206 – Celilo Park, Deschutes State Park	
Sherman		202.48	325.86	104	US 97 – Yakima, Bend	
Gilliam	Arlington	235.74	379.39	137	OR 19 – Arlington, Condon	
Gilliam		245.27	394.72	147	OR 74 – Ione, Heppner	
Morrow		265.87	427.88	168	US 730 / Lewis and Clark Trail – Irrigon	
Umatilla		277.37	446.38	179	I-82 west – Hermiston, Umatilla, Kennewick	
Umatilla		280.78	451.87	182	OR 207 – Hermiston, Lexington	
Umatilla		286.76	461.50	188	US 395 north – Stanfield, Echo, Hermiston	Western end of US 395 overlap
Umatilla		291.45	469.04	193	Echo Road (Lexington–Echo Highway) – Echo, Lexington	
Umatilla	Pendleton	305.02	490.88		I-84 east / US 395 south – La Grande	Eastern end of I-84 overlap
Umatilla	Pendleton	307.13	494.28		OR 37 north – Holdman	
Umatilla	Pendleton	307.66	495.13		To US 395 south – Pilot Rock, John Day	
Umatilla	Pendleton	308.97	497.24		OR 11 south to I-84 / US 395 – Portland, La Grande	Western end of OR 11 overlap
Umatilla	Pendleton	309.67	498.37		OR 11 north – Milton-Freewater, Walla Walla	Eastern end of OR 11 overlap
Umatilla		310.38	499.51		Mission Road – Mission, Indian Agency, Gibbon	Interchange; eastbound exit and westbound entrance
Umatilla		311.65	501.55		I-84 west – Portland	Western end of I-84 overlap; westbound exit and eastbound entrance
Umatilla		314.33	505.87	216	Milton-Freewater, Walla Walla (OR 331)	
Union		351.11	565.06	252	OR 244 – Starkey, Ukiah	
Union		357.47	575.29		I-84 east – Baker City, Ontario	Eastern end of I-84 overlap; eastbound exit and westbound entrance
Union	La Grande	359.74	578.95		OR 82 to I-84 – Elgin, Wallowa Lake	
Union		362.86– 363.27	583.97– 584.63		I-84 west / OR 203 south – Pendleton, Union	Western end of I-84 overlap
Union	North Powder	383.52– 383.70	617.22– 617.51		I-84 east / OR 237 – Baker City, North Powder	Eastern end of I-84 overlap
Baker	Baker City	403.17	648.84		OR 7 north to I-84 – Richland, La Grande, Hells Canyon	Western end of OR 7 overlap
Baker	Baker City	403.41	649.23		OR 7 south – Salisbury, Unity, John Day	Eastern end of OR 7 overlap
Baker		405.84	653.14		I-84 west – La Grande	Western end of I-84 overlap
Baker		441.58	710.65		I-84 east – Ontario	Eastern end of I-84 overlap; eastbound exit and westbound entrance
Baker		444.84	715.90		I-84 – Baker City, Ontario	Interchange
Malheur		452.67	728.50		I-84 west – Baker City	Western end of I-84 overlap
Malheur		455.55	733.14	356	OR 201 – Weiser	Former US 30N east
Malheur		473.93	762.72	374	OR 201 (US 30 Bus. east) to US 20 / US 26 – Ontario, Weiser, Vale	
Malheur	Ontario	476.02– 476.28	766.08– 766.50		I-84 east / US 30 Bus. west to US 20 / US 26 – Boise, Ontario, Vale	
Malheur	Ontario	477.02	767.69		US 30 east – Fruitland	Bridge over the Snake River (state line); continuation into Idaho
1.000 mi = 1.609 km; 1.000 km = 0.621 mi: Concurrency terminus; Incomplete access; Tolled

== See also ==
- U.S. Route 630
- U.S. Route 730
- U.S. Route 830

U.S. Route 30
Previous state: Terminus	Oregon	Next state: Idaho
