= MHH =

MHH may refer to:

- Marsh Harbour Airport's IATA code
- Medizinische Hochschule Hannover or Hannover Medical School
- Glenn de MHH
- Menstrual health and hygiene
- Mount Hood Highway, a highway in Oregon, United States
