= Oregon Route 281 =

State highway in Hood River County, Oregon, US

Oregon Route 281
- Route 281 highlighted in red

Route information
- Maintained by ODOT
- Length: 19.01 mi (30.59 km)
- Existed: 2002–present

Major junctions
- South end: OR 35 in Mount Hood
- OR 282 near Hood River
- North end: US 30 / OR 35 in Hood River

Location
- Country: United States
- State: Oregon
- County: Hood River

Highway system
- Oregon Highways; Interstate; US; State; Named; Scenic
| ← OR 273 | → OR 282 |

Oregon Route 281 is an Oregon state highway running from Hood River to the community of Mount Hood. OR 281 is known as the Hood River Highway No. 281 (see Oregon highways and routes). It is 19.01 miles (30.59 km) long and runs north–south, entirely within Hood River County.

OR 281 was established in 2002 as part of Oregon's project to assign route numbers to highways that previously were not assigned.

== Route description ==
OR 281 begins at an intersection with US 30 and OR 35 at Hood River and heads south, intersecting OR 282 five miles (8 km) south of Hood River. OR 281 continues south through Winans, Dee, and Trout Creek to Parkdale. At Parkdale, OR 281 turns northeast for two miles (3 km) to the community of Mount Hood, where it ends at an intersection with OR 35. OR 281 is also known as Dee Highway as residents that live along the highway have the name as part of their mailing address.

== History ==
OR 281 was assigned to the Hood River Highway in 2002.

== Major intersections ==
The entire route is in Hood River County.

| Location | mi | km | Destinations | Notes |
|---|---|---|---|---|
| Hood River | 0.00 | 0.00 | US 30 / OR 35 to I-84 – Portland, Hood River City Center, The Dalles | |
| | 5.09 | 8.19 | OR 282 – Fairgrounds, Odell | |
| Mount Hood | 19.07 | 30.69 | OR 35 – Odell, Hood River, Government Camp, Mount Hood | |
1.000 mi = 1.609 km; 1.000 km = 0.621 mi
