= Pine Grove, Hood River County, Oregon =

Unincorporated community in the state of Oregon, United States

Coordinates: 45°39′12″N 121°30′49″W

Pine Grove is an unincorporated community in Hood River County, Oregon, United States on Oregon Route 35 in the middle Hood River Valley near Neal Creek. It is about five miles south of the city of Hood River and has a Hood River ZIP code.

== History ==
Pine Grove was a station on the Mount Hood Railroad and was named for a stand of timber that once existed at this locale. In 1886, German immigrant Peter Mohr planted 400 apple trees in the Pine Grove area, in what was probably the first commercial orchard in the Hood River Valley planted on dry land and relying solely on irrigation. Pine Grove was also one of the primary communities in the Hood River Valley farmed by Nikkei—Japanese migrants and their descendants.

== Economy ==
Like much of Hood River County, the economy of Pine Grove is based on agriculture, especially fruit orchards and the accompanying storage and packing facilities. Businesses in the Pine Grove area include The Fruit Company, which packs and ships fruit gift baskets and gourmet food products, and Mount Hood Winery. Mount Hood Winery's cooperative winemaking facility is located in a former fruit-packing warehouse. Also located in Pine Grove is Columbia Gorge Fruit Growers, a non-profit organization of 400 growers and 20 shippers of tree fruit in the Mid-Columbia area that works to encourage and promote the fruit industry. To preserve the history of the area's principal industry, The Fruit Foundation Historical Society in 2012 planned to open the Fruit Heritage Museum in Pine Grove in a historic cold storage and fruit packing facility built in the 1930s and now owned by the Fruit Company.

== Historic structures ==
Pine Grove Grange celebrated its 100th anniversary in 2006. It is the oldest Grange in Hood River County. The current Grange hall originally served as a general store and the upstairs was a community dance hall. Today the Hood River Valley Playhouse uses the upstairs stage for its productions.

Pine Grove Methodist Church was dedicated in 1907 and still serves the community today.

The Martin and Carrie Hill House near Pine Grove is a 1910 Dutch Colonial Revival house on a working farm listed on the National Register of Historic Places.

== Education ==
Pine Grove Elementary School is part of the Hood River County School District. The current school was built in 1927 and has the original cast iron school bell in the cupola. The first school on the current school grounds was built in 1887 in the pine grove for which the community is named. The pine grove was cut down in 1957, but a group of students and alumni replanted pine trees around the school during a reunion in 2008. Pine Grove Elementary was closed as a K-5 school in 2011.

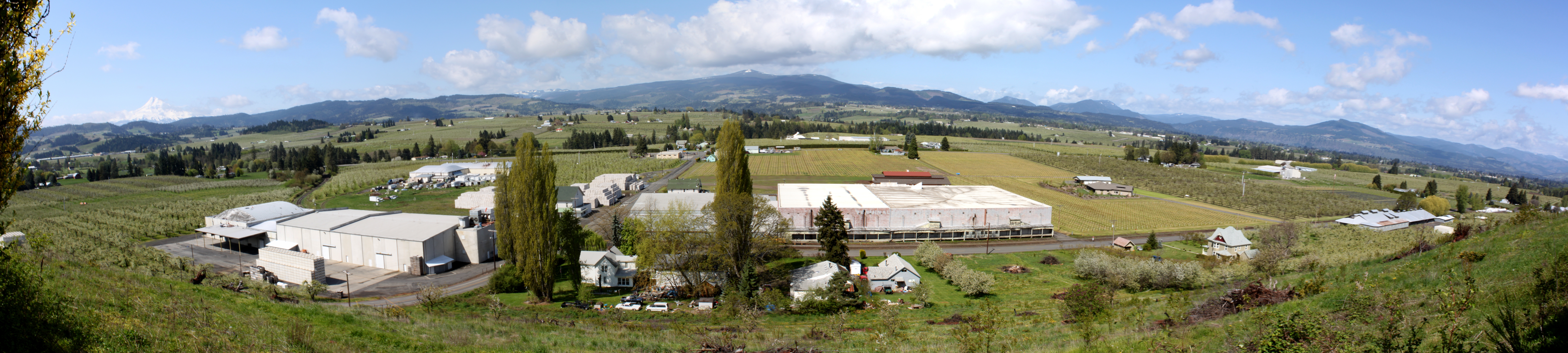
Panorama of Pine Grove with Mount Hood at left and fruit warehouses in the foreground
