= Oregon Highway 26 =

There is no present signed state-numbered highway numbered 26 in the U.S. state of Oregon. Oregon Highway 26 may refer to:

- U.S. Route 26 in Oregon
- U.S. Route 20 in Oregon, known in Oregon as Oregon Route 26 from 1932 to 1943
- Mount Hood Highway, also known as Mount Hood Highway No. 26
