= Barlow Pass (Oregon) =

Mountain pass in the Cascades in Oregon, United States

- Interactive map of Barlow Pass
- Elevation: 4,155 ft (1,266 m)
- Traversed by: OR 35 and Pacific Crest Trail

Third Approach
- Location: Clackamas / Hood River counties, Oregon, United States
- Range: Cascades
- Coordinates: 45.28324°N 121.68462°W

Barlow Pass is a 4,155-foot (1,266 m) mountain pass in the Cascades in Oregon, on the Oregon Trail, and one of the major milestones of the Barlow Road. It is the crest of the Cascade Mountains: the dividing line between watersheds of the Deschutes River and those that flow into the Sandy River.

It is located on the southern flanks of Mount Hood and traversed by Oregon Route 35. Highway 35 and the Barlow Road converge to within 400 ft (125 m) at the pass. Originally a "rustic and scenic" summer road, Highway 35 was straightened and widened throughout 1964–1968 for practical winter road maintenance. Sharp turns were eliminated and elevation changes more graduated, unlike the Barlow Road, which sharply descends westward at the foot of the pass. The Barlow Road route is popular for cross country skiing, and the pass is a trailhead to the Pacific Crest Trail, which runs north and south across the pass.
