= Woodson, Oregon =

Unincorporated community in the state of Oregon, United States

Coordinates: 46.114555°N 123.324291°W

Woodson is an unincorporated community in Columbia County, Oregon, United States. It is located on U.S. Route 30 seven miles west of Clatskanie and three miles east of Westport, on Westport Slough, a tributary of the Columbia River. In December 2007, the debris overflow from the flooding of Eilersten Creek caused evacuations and mud cover on Woodson Road north of the highway.

Woodson was named for Woods Landing on Westport Slough, which in turn was named a man whose surname was Wood. He would haul logs to the area and dump them into the slough, where they were made into rafts for transportation to sawmills downriver.
