= Dee, Oregon =

Unincorporated community in the state of Oregon, United States

Coordinates: 45°35′17″N 121°37′36″W

Dee is an unincorporated community and former company town in Hood River County, Oregon, United States, on Oregon Route 281, about 11 miles south of Hood River.

== History ==
The Oregon Lumber Company built a sawmill at Dee in 1906 and named it for Thomas Duncombe Dee, a stockholder and business associate of board member David Eccles. Dee was also a station on the Eccles-owned Mount Hood Railroad. In addition to the large sawmill, Dee had a privately owned water works and electric lighting system, as well as a general store, shops, and a hotel.

Dee had a population of 250 in 1915; 200 in 1919, and by 1940 the population had declined to 100.

Dee was sold to the Edward Hines Lumber Company in 1958 and they dismantled the town.

Besides logging, Dee's economy is also tied to the fruit-growing industry of the Hood River Valley. The area was one of the primary communities in the Hood River Valley farmed by Nikkei—Japanese migrants and their descendants. The first Japanese in the area were hired as laborers on the Mount Hood Railroad. They also worked at the mill and lived in the company housing on both sides of the East Fork Hood River, which passes through the town.

About 35 Nikkei families lived in Dee in the 1920s and they founded the Dee Japanese Community Hall.

== Geography ==
The area's fruit orchards lie between the east and west forks of the Hood River in an area known as Dee Flat.

== Economy ==
Oregon Democratic State Senator Wayne Fawbush operated a blueberry farm in Dee for 20 years; it is still in operation.
