= Hood River (Oregon) =

River in Oregon, U.S.

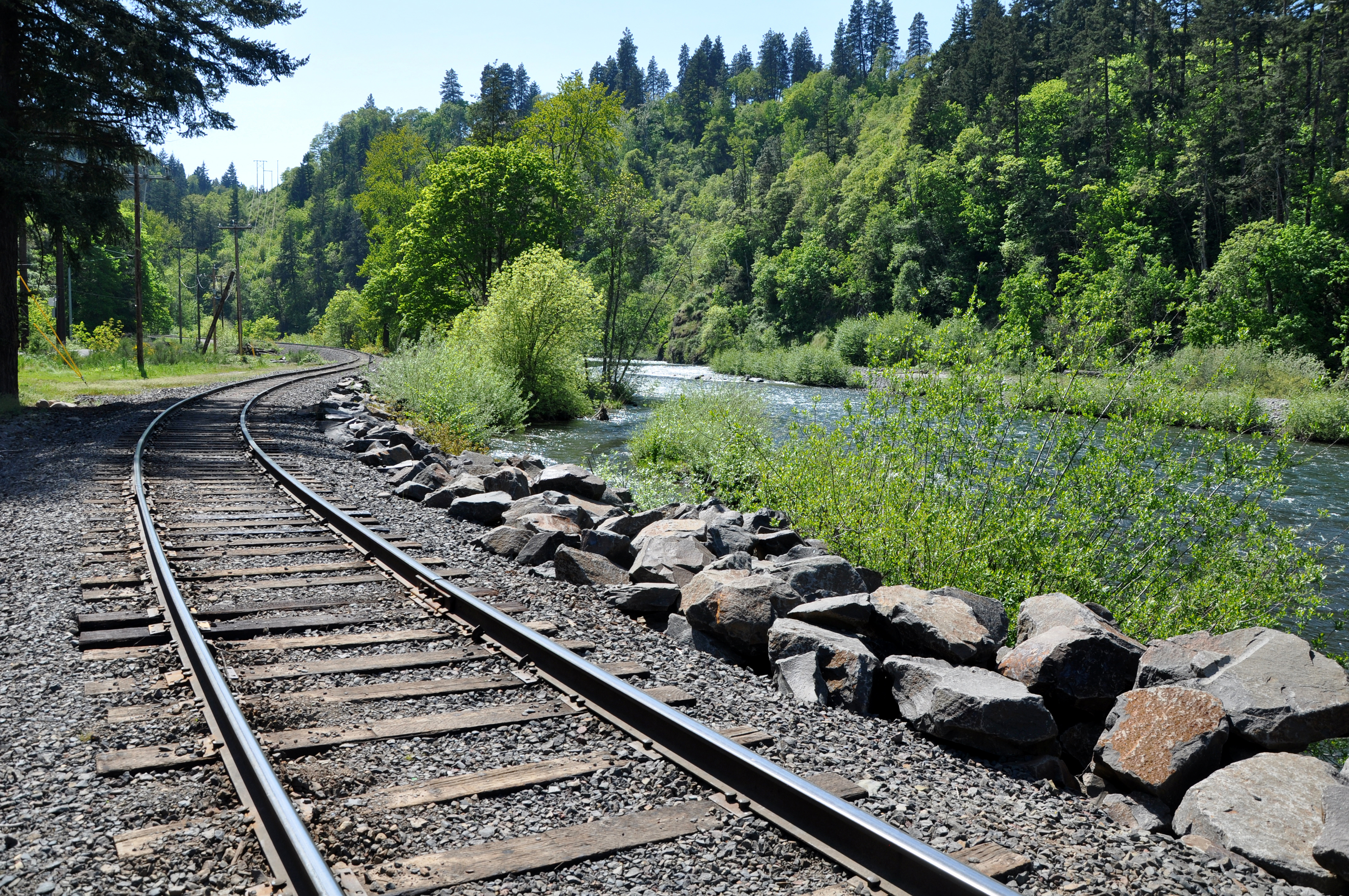
- Along the Mount Hood Railroad near the city of Hood River

- Location of the mouth of the Hood River in Oregon

Location
- Country: United States
- State: Oregon
- County: Hood River

Physical characteristics
- Source: Mount Hood
  - location: Cascade Range
  - coordinates: 45°36′18″N 121°37′58″W
- Mouth: Columbia River
  - coordinates: 45°42′55″N 121°30′40″W
  - elevation: 79 ft (24 m)
- Length: 25 mi (40 km)
- Basin size: 279 sq mi (720 km^{2})
- Discharge
  - location: river mile 6.1, near Hood River, OR
  - average: 975 cu ft/s (27.6 m^{3}/s)
  - minimum: 136 cu ft/s (3.9 m^{3}/s)
  - maximum: 33,200 cu ft/s (940 m^{3}/s)

National Wild and Scenic River
- Type: Scenic, Recreational

The Hood River, formerly known as Dog River, is a tributary of the Columbia River in northwestern Oregon, United States. Approximately 25 miles (40 km) long from its mouth to its farthest headwaters on the East Fork, the river descends from wilderness areas in the Cascade Range on Mount Hood and flows through the agricultural Hood River Valley to join the Columbia River in the Columbia River Gorge.

It rises in three separate forks on the north side of Mount Hood, within the Mount Hood Wilderness in Hood River County which is approximately 55 miles (89 km) east of Portland.

== West Fork ==
The West Fork, approximately 15 miles (24 km) long, rises on northwestern Mount Hood from Ladd Glacier. It flows generally east-northeast and joins the East Fork from the west near Dee.

== Middle Fork ==
The Middle Fork, approximately 10 miles (16 km) long, rises in several short branches on the north slopes of Mount Hood, from Coe Glacier and Eliot Glacier. It flows north through the upper Hood River Valley.

== East Fork ==
The East Fork, approximately 15 miles (24 km) long, rises on the eastern side of the mountain in the Mount Hood National Forest in the Mt. Hood Meadows Ski area fed by Newton-Clark Glacier, and flows northward into the Upper Hood River Valley, where it is joined by the Dog River and then by the Middle Fork.

== Main stem ==
The combined main stem river, approximately 10 miles (16 km) long, flows northeast through the Hood River Valley. It joins the Columbia at Hood River, a popular destination for windsurfing and kiteboarding in the Columbia Gorge.

== History ==
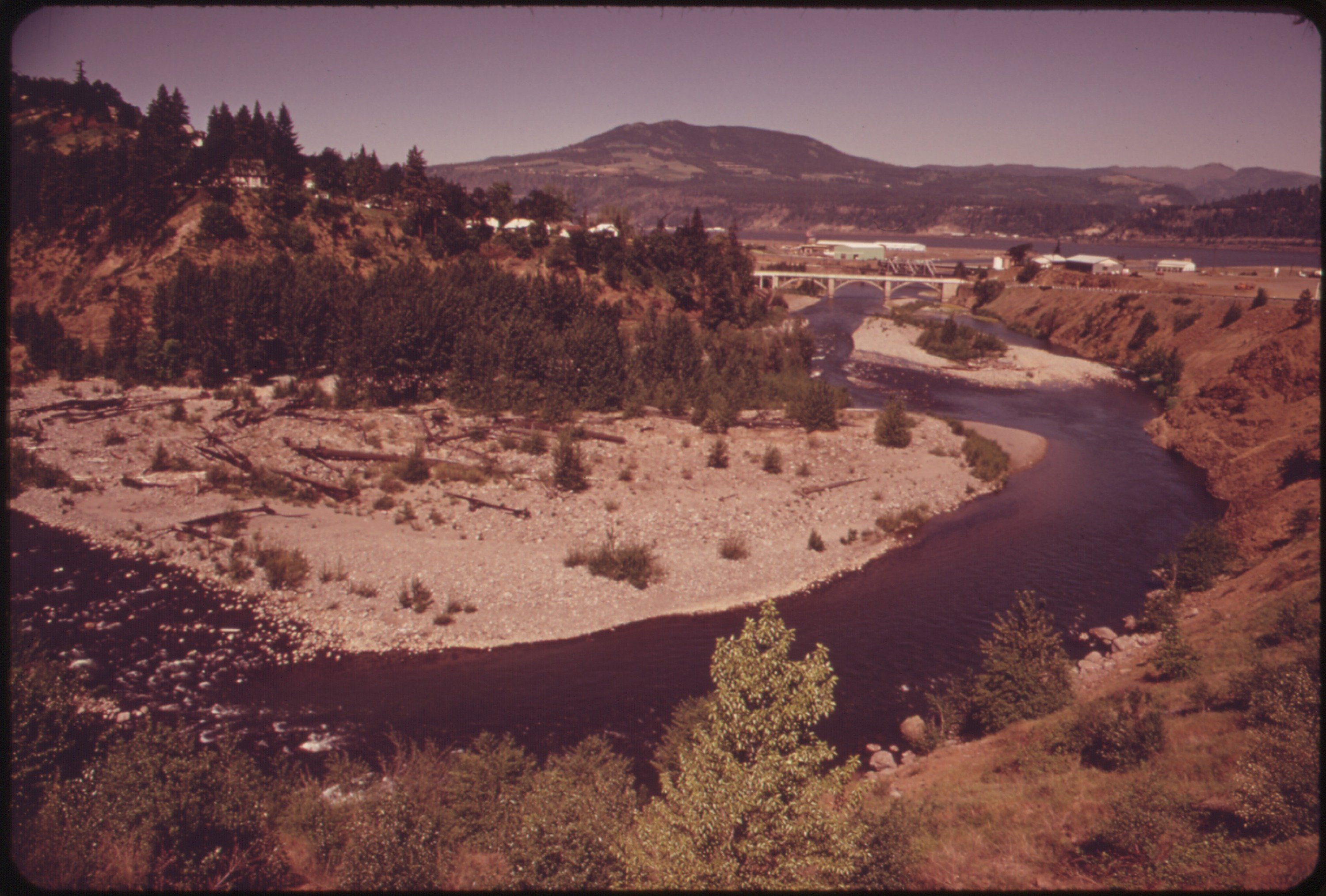
The Hood River near its exit into the Columbia River, 1973

The maps of the Lewis and Clark Expedition show the Hood River under the name Labeasche River after Francis Labiche, one of the expedition's members. In the mid-19th century pioneer era a party of starving travelers resorted to eating dog meat. As a result, the Hood River became known as the Dog River. This name was unpopular. A pioneer resident of the area, Mrs. Nathaniel Coe, was able to change local usage to Hood River, after Mount Hood. The name Hood River appeared on maps as early as 1856. The older Dog River name became attached to a lesser tributary of the East Fork Hood River.

Powerdale Dam built in the early 1920s on the Lower Hood River once supplied nearly 6 MW of hydro power. Built by PacificCorp, Powerdale dam was fully removed in Summer of 2010. The Old Powerhouse still stands as a historical/visual reminder of hydro generation on the Hood River. PacificCorp donated 400 acres of surplus land between the former Powerdale Dam and the Old Powerhouse downstream in 2013 to Hood River County (101 acres) and Columbia Land Trust (299 acres) to be a fully protected riparian buffer. Other conservation successes have occurred along the Hood River and its tributaries. The 12 foot high Odell Creek Dam on Odell Creek was removed by September 2016. Farmers continue to upgrade/screen irrigation diversions for the protection of the Columbia River Fisheries. All indications point to a healthier and improved salmon and steelhead fishery on the Hood River thanks to continued efforts of Oregon Department of Fish and Wildlife (ODFW), local interests, and collaborative efforts with the Warm Springs Tribe.

== Maps ==
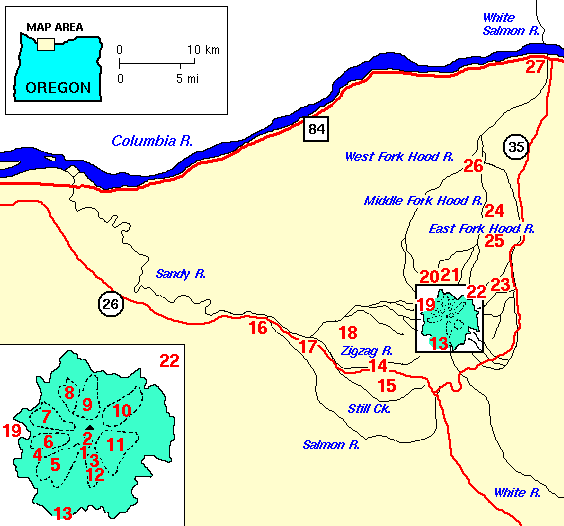
Hood River and surroundings

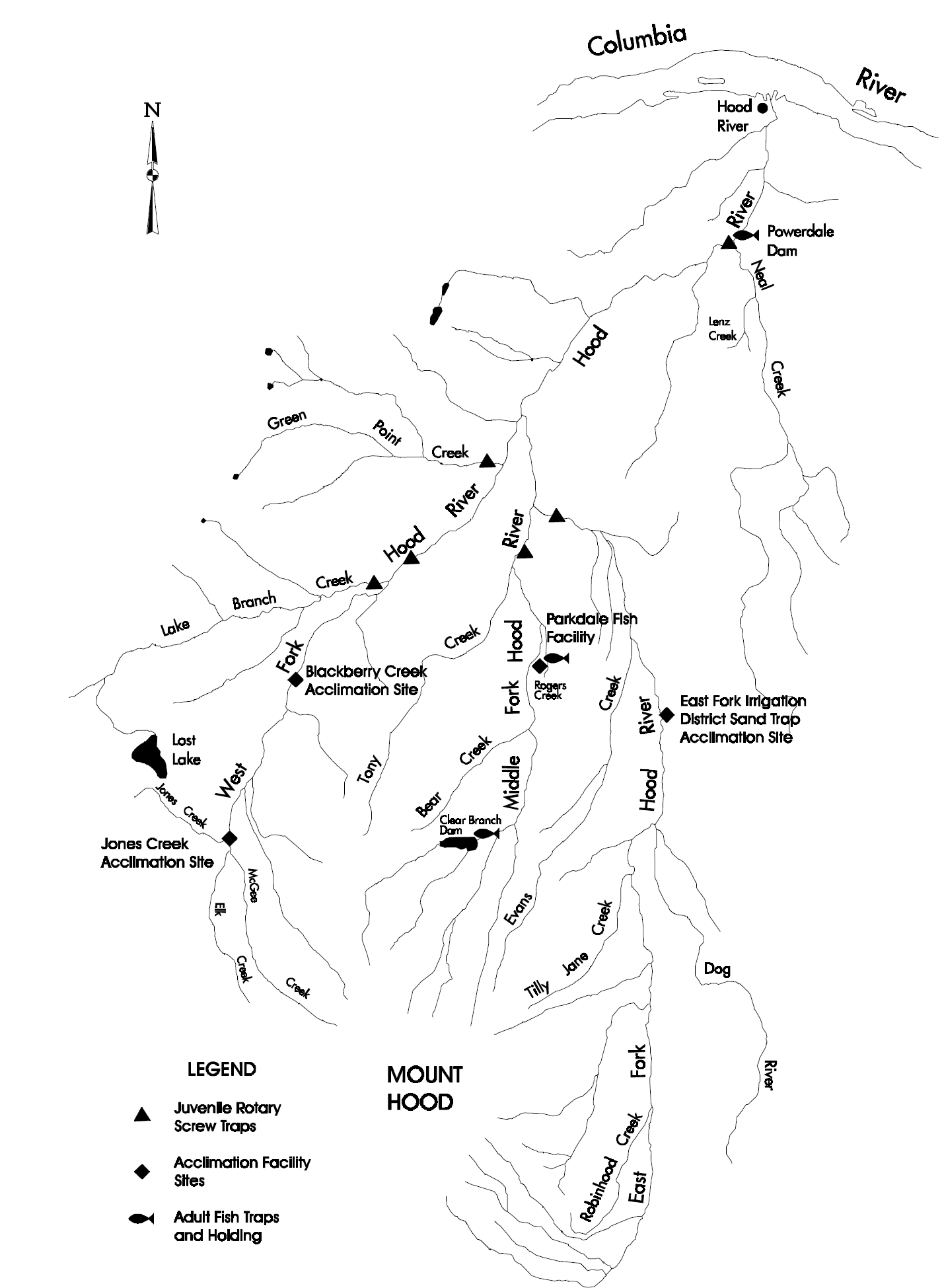
Hood River watershed

== See also ==
- List of Oregon rivers
