= Mount Hood Railroad =

Tourist railroad based in Hood River, Oregon

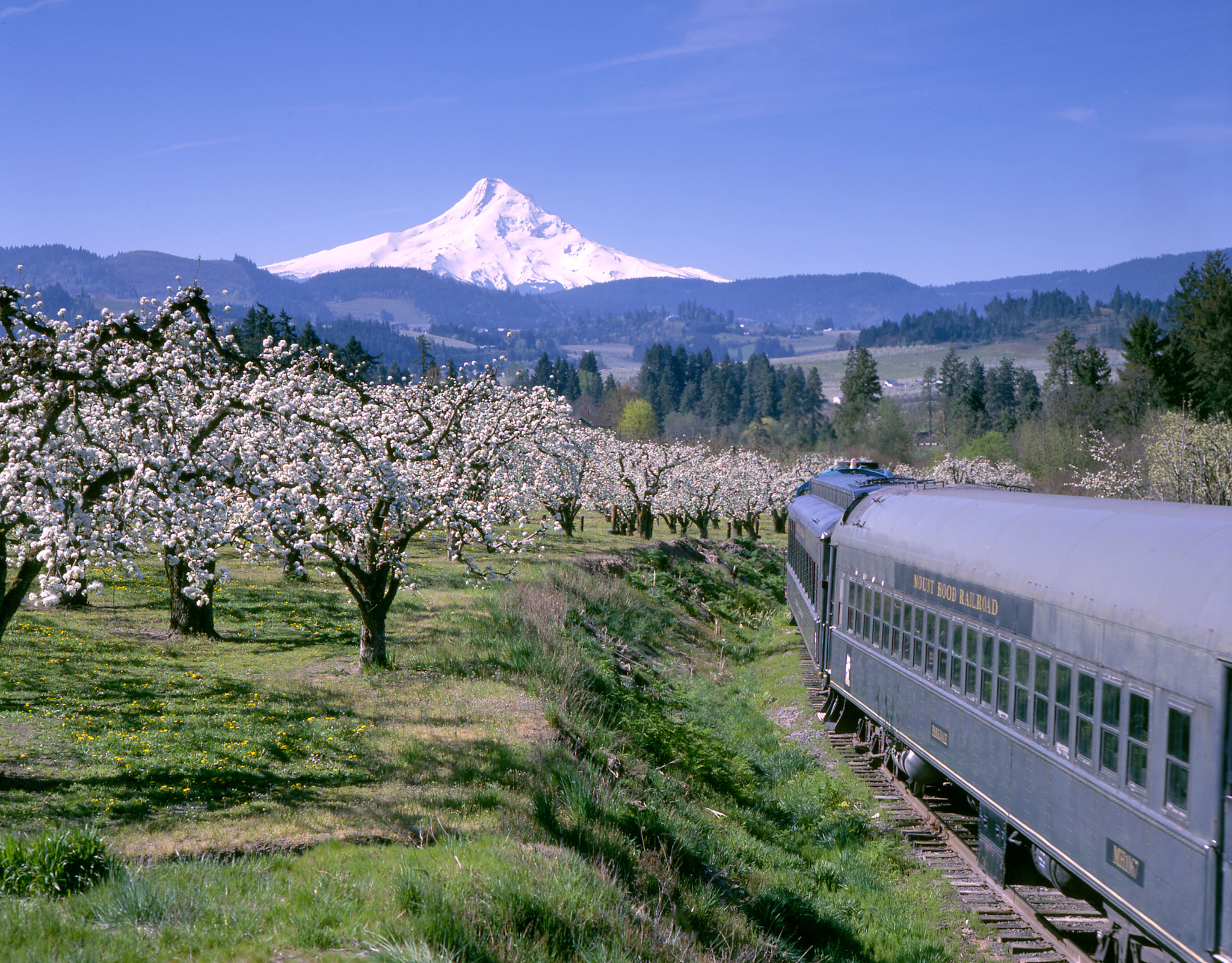
- The Mount Hood Railroad in spring, with Mount Hood in the background.
- Terminus: Hood River, Oregon - Parkdale

Commercial operations
- Original gauge: 4 ft 8 1/2 in (1,435 mm)

Preserved operations
- Length: 21.3 m (70 ft)
- Preserved gauge: 4 ft 8 1/2 in (1,435 mm)

Commercial history
- Opened: 1906 / 1909
- Closed: 1987

Preservation history
- 1987: Bought by private investors
- 2008: Sold to Permian Basin Railways (Iowa Pacific Holdings)
- 2022: Sold to Mount Hood Capital Investments LLC
- Mt. Hood Railroad Linear Historic District
- U.S. National Register of Historic Places
- U.S. Historic district
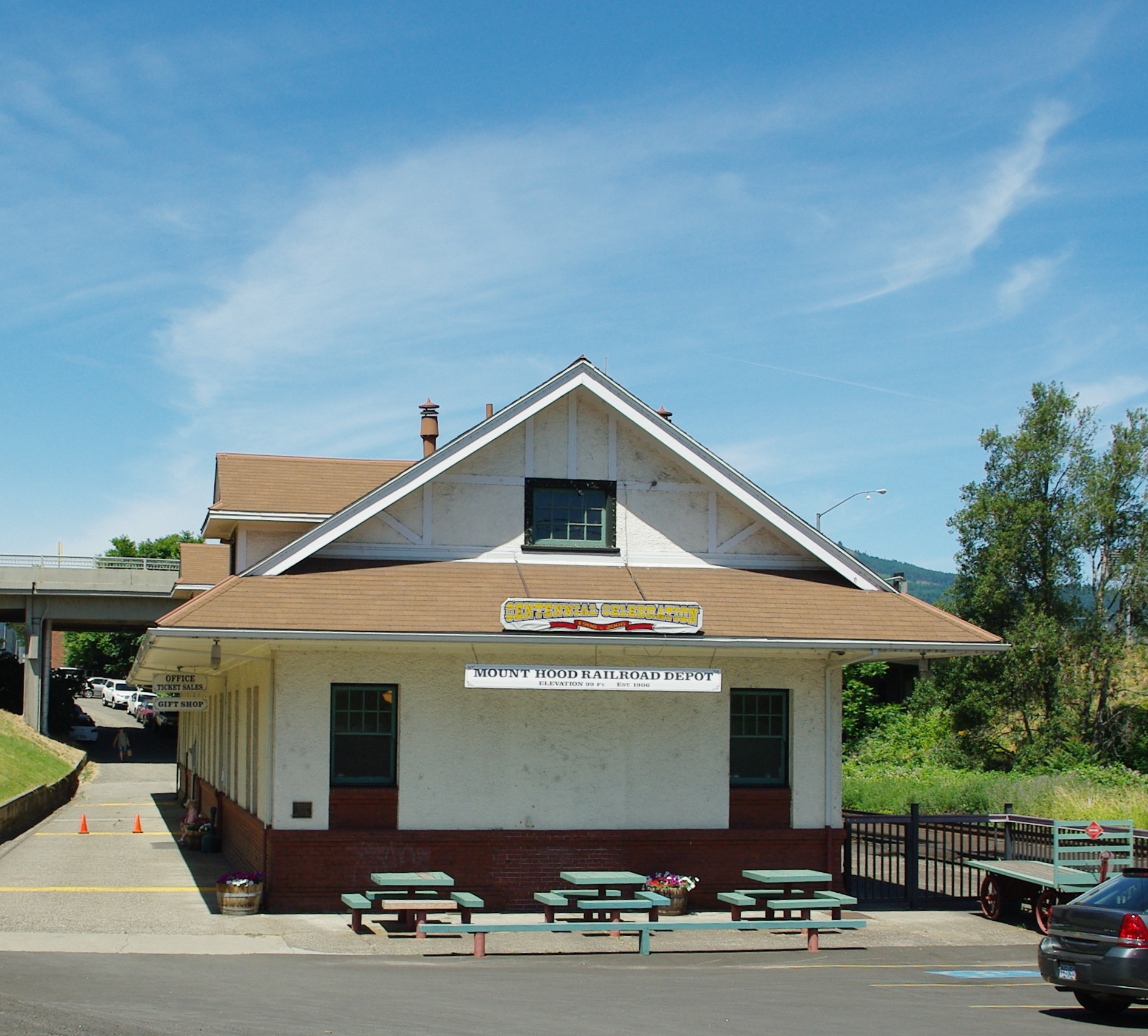
- Railroad depot in Hood River

- Location within Oregon
- Location: Mt. Hood RR right-of-way from Hood River to Parkdale, Hood River, Oregon
- Area: 165 acres (67 ha)
- Built: 1906
- Architect: Joseph A. West (design/construction)
- NRHP reference No.: 93001507
- Added to NRHP: January 24, 1994

Website
- mthoodrr.com

The Mount Hood Railroad (reporting mark MHRR) is a heritage and shortline freight railroad located in Hood River, Oregon, 60 miles (97 km) east of Portland, Oregon, United States.

The majority of the railroad's revenue is generated from passenger excursions although a few small freight shippers remain that generate several carloads of traffic per week.

== MHRR trackage ==
The northern terminus of the Mount Hood Railroad is at Hood River, Oregon, where the line interchanges with the Union Pacific Railroad. The line starts out parallel to the Hood River for the first three miles (4.8 km) until it reaches a switchback. Switchbacks used to be common, but this is now only one of five remaining railroad switchbacks in use in the United States. After the trains reverse direction at the switchback, the line continues south through the communities of Pine Grove, Odell, and Dee before reaching the southern end of the line at Parkdale. The total length of the line is approximately 22 miles.

== History ==
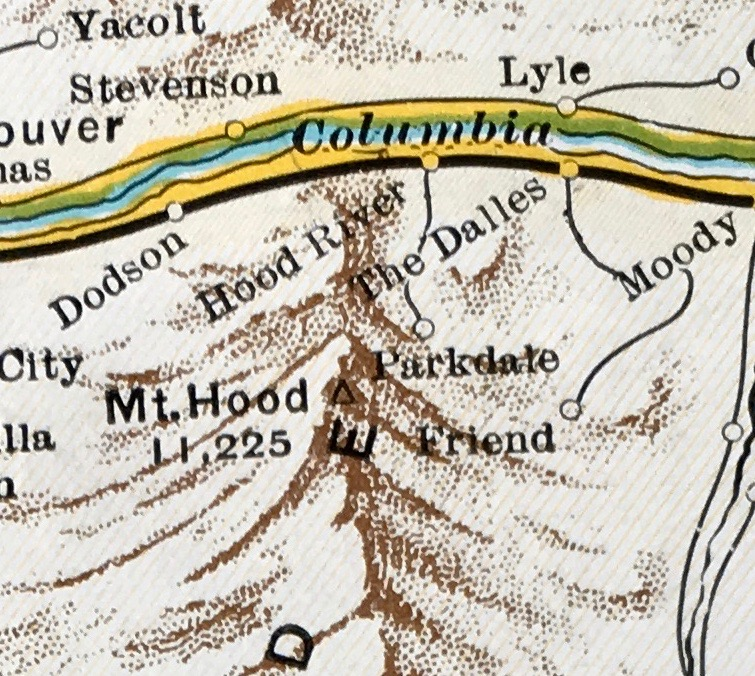
Route in 1931

The line south out of Hood River was first built in 1906, extending as far as Dee, Oregon. In 1909 the line was extended to the present-day end of track at Parkdale, Oregon. The Union Pacific acquired the line in 1968 and operated it with the primary customers being fruit shippers and the lumber operation at Dee. As local industries switched to truck-based transportation for their goods, carloads on the line dwindled and the Union Pacific proposed abandoning the line. In 1987 a group of local investors purchased the railroad from Union Pacific and began to offer passenger excursions to augment the freight business. Brian Fleming sold the line again in 2008 to Permian Basin Railways, a subsidiary of Chicago-based Iowa Pacific Holdings.

Oregon's Mount Hood Railroad was sold in January 2022 to a local investment firm. The tourist railroad and freight operator had been placed into receivership back in 2019 when its previous owner, Iowa Pacific Holdings, defaulted on a $5 million loan. The new owner, Mount Hood Capital Investments LLC, plans on keeping the railroad's current local management. They also plan on acquiring another locomotive in hopes of increasing freight business. The railroad can operate on all 22 miles of track from Hood River to Parkdale. L. Scott Webster, the head of the investment firm is excited about the potential of Mt. Hood Railroad and what it means for the region. The railroad envisions great value by enhancing local agritourism, growing the freight business and providing solutions for the community.

Today the railroad offers scenic tours through the Hood River Valley and narrated historic excursion train tours, as well as special events. They also offer motor-assisted railbike tours on the line. There are views of Mount Hood and Mount Adams along with the surrounding orchards and farmland of the Hood River Valley.

== Equipment ==
=== Locomotives ===
Locomotive details
Number	Image	Type	Model	Built	Builder	Status
1639		Diesel	GP9u	1956	Electro-Motive Diesel	Operational
4101		Diesel	GP9	1957	Electro-Motive Diesel	Operational

=== Former units ===
Locomotive details
Number	Image	Type	Model	Built	Builder	Owner
02		Diesel	GP38	1969	Electro-Motive Diesel	Denver Rock Island Railroad
18		Steam	2-8-0	1910	American Locomotive Company	The Maguire Family Foundation
88		Diesel	GP9	1959	Electro-Motive Diesel	Denver Rock Island Railroad
89		Diesel	GP9	1959	Electro-Motive Diesel	Colorado Pacific Rio Grande Railroad
2250		Diesel	GP38-3	1964	Electro-Motive Diesel	Leased to Western Rail, Inc.

== Accidents and incidents ==
On December 2, 2017, a passenger train derailed 3 miles (4.8 km) from Hood River. There were no injuries amongst the 214 people on board the train. The line was closed until December 8.

== See also ==
- List of heritage railroads in the United States
