= Cooper Spur ski area =

Ski area in Oregon, United States

Cooper Spur
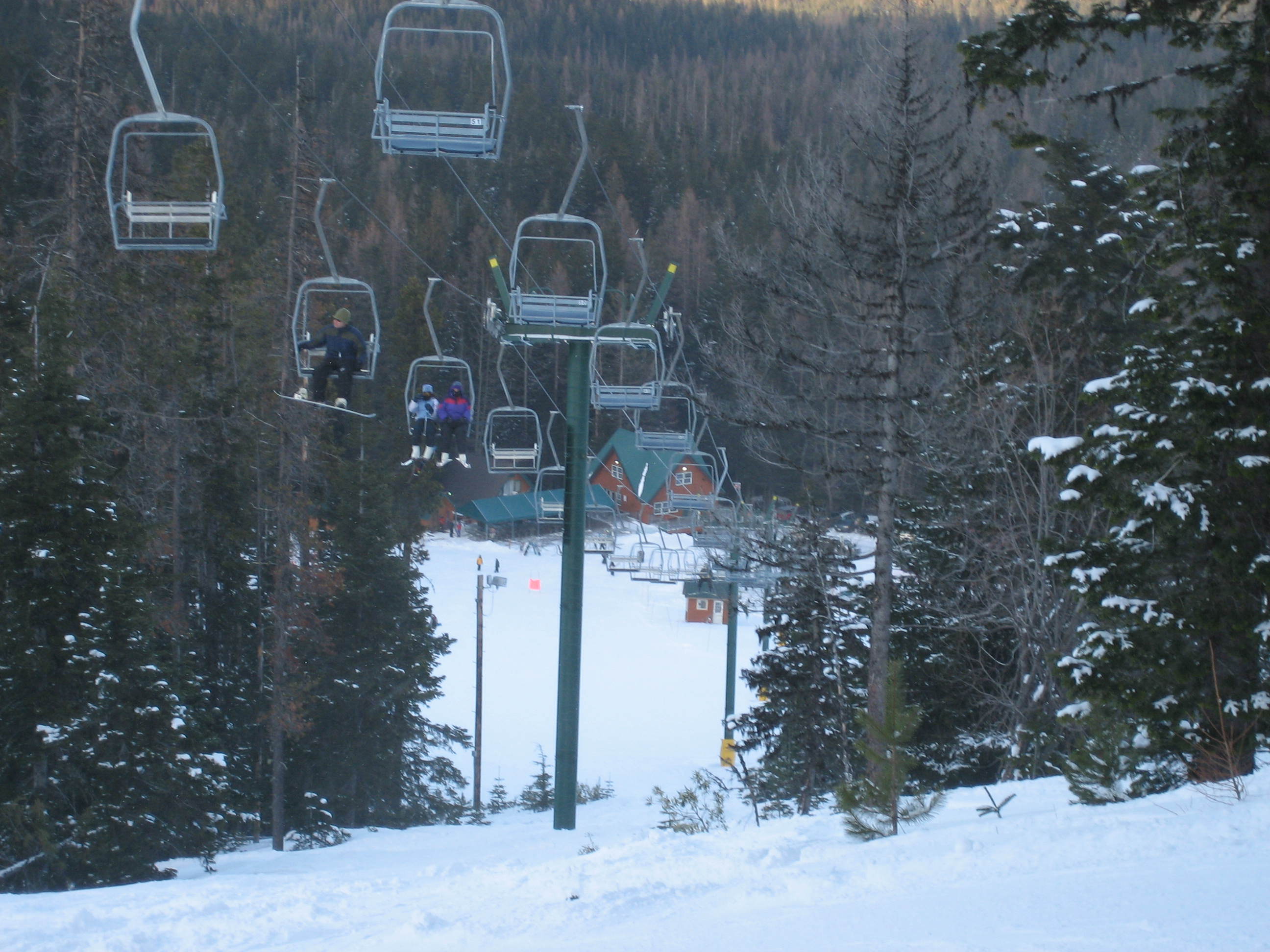
- Cooper Spur looking down the liftline

- Location in Oregon Cooper Spur (the United States)
- Location: Mount Hood, Oregon, US
- Nearest city: Hood River 23 miles (35 km) north, Portland 60 miles (100 km) west
- Coordinates: 45.41228°N 121.60501°W
- Top elevation: 4,350 ft (1,330 m)
- Base elevation: 4,000 ft (1,200 m)
- Skiable area: 50 acres (0.2 km^{2})
- Trails: 10
- Longest run: 0.25 m (9.8 in)
- Lift system: 1 chair, 1 rope tow, 2 tows for tubing
- Snowfall: 8.3 ft (2.5 m)
- Website: Cooper Spur

Cooper Spur ski area is a ski area located on northeast Mount Hood, Oregon, United States. The resort has one double chair ski lift serving ten runs, and a vertical drop of 110 meters (350 ft). There are 6.5 kilometres (4.0 mi) of cross-country skiing trails. The uphill capacity of the lift is 1,200 skiers per hour, and the summit rises to 1,326 metres (4,350 ft). The resort encompasses 0.2 square kilometres (49 acres) of terrain, and receives an average of 2.5 metres (98 in) of snow per year.

Cooper Spur Mountain Resort has 3.1 square kilometres (770 acres) of forest on which condos, log cabins, a restaurant, and a hotel are located.

== Expansion ==
In the summer of 2001, Cooper Spur was purchased by an affiliate of Mount Hood Meadows named Meadows North LLC, and announced its intention to develop the Cooper Spur area as a year round destination resort with additional lifts, runs, and accommodation. A July 18, 2001 proposal included developing a golf course, 450 housing units, a conference center, ice rink, swimming pool, amphitheater, shopping mall, and other developments. The development was opposed by groups which favor preserving and expanding wilderness areas of northern Mount Hood. Other concerns include potentially disrupting a key elk migration route, watershed disruption for two thousand nearby residents, and deforestation.

A controversial land swap was concluded with Hood River County by Meadows North LLC which increased the acreage adjacent to Cooper Spur owned by Meadows North LLC.

In the summer of 2002, the decades-old T-bar lift was replaced with a double chair, and excavation work created a tubing area.

After Meadows North LLC abandoned its initiative to develop Cooper Spur, a proposal was made to trade Cooper Spur's facilities, existing 770 acres (3.1 km^{2}), and its special-use permit which authorizes 1,350 acres (5.5 km^{2}) of development in exchange for 120 acres (0.49 km^{2}) of Forest Service land near Government Camp. The proposal became a provision of House Bill 5025 [109th] (Mount Hood Stewardship Legacy Act) and passed the House, but expired without senate approval. According to a GAO assessment, the value of lands were not appraised equivalently and probably not fairly.

== See also ==
- List of ski areas and resorts in the United States#Oregon
