= Mount Hood, Oregon =

Unincorporated community in the state of Oregon, United States

- Census-designated place
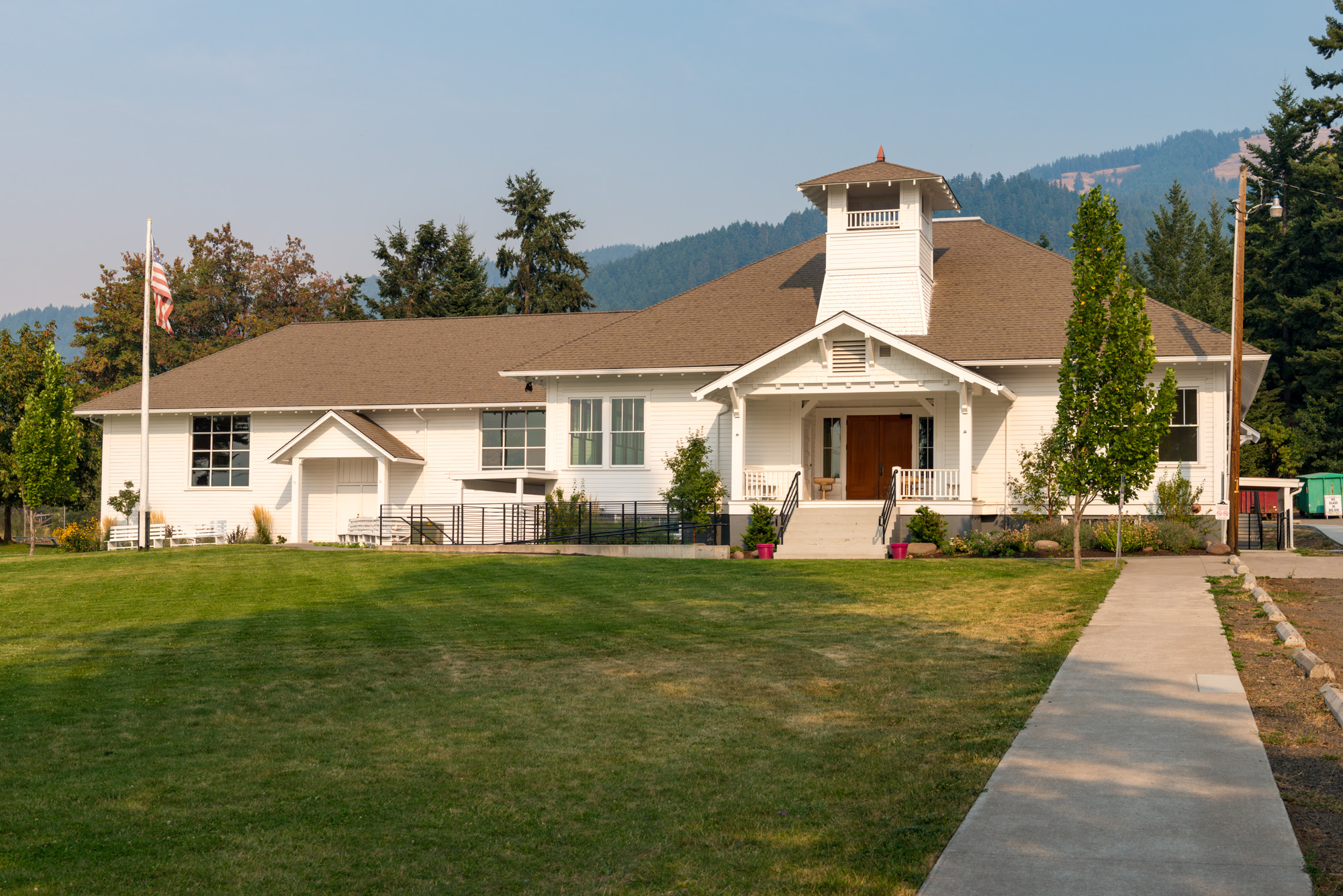
- Mount Hood School House

- Location within Oregon Location within the United States
- Coordinates: 45°32′02″N 121°33′58″W
- Country: United States
- State: Oregon
- County: Hood River

Area
  - Total: 1.92 sq mi (4.97 km^{2})
  - Land: 1.92 sq mi (4.97 km^{2})
  - Water: 0 sq mi (0.00 km^{2})
- Elevation: 1,565 ft (477 m)

Population (2020)
  - Total: 310
  - Density: 161.5/sq mi (62.37/km^{2})
- Time zone: UTC-8 (Pacific (PST))
  - Summer (DST): UTC-7 (PDT)
- ZIP code: 97041 (Mount Hood Parkdale)
- Area code: 541
- FIPS code: 41-50200
- GNIS feature ID: 2611768

Mount Hood is an unincorporated community and census-designated place (CDP) in Hood River County, Oregon, United States, about 3 miles (5 km) northeast of Parkdale on Oregon Route 35. As of the 2020 census, Mount Hood had a population of 310. Mount Hood is the terminus of Oregon Route 281, the Hood River Highway.

The community was developed on land owned by a settler named Tieman, and the post office was named for Mount Hood, the most notable object in the landscape.

In 1976, the United States Postal Service consolidated the post office with that of Parkdale, which was the larger community. Local residents preferred the name "Mount Hood", however, so the post office was named Mount Hood Parkdale.

There were two other localities with post offices named Mount Hood in Oregon, one in Wasco County and one in Yamhill County. The Wasco County post office ran from 1872–1878 and the Yamhill County post office ran from 1854–1862. Both places were probably named for their views of Mount Hood.

== Mt. Hood Town Hall ==
This historic building is the cultural gravitational center of the Mount Hood community, and features art shows, cooking and sewing classes, basketball and tennis contests, exercise classes, weddings, and community meetings.

== Demographics ==
Historical population
Census	Pop.	Note	%±
2020	310		—
U.S. Decennial Census

== Climate ==
This region experiences warm (but not hot) and dry summers, with no average monthly temperatures above 71.6 °F. According to the Köppen Climate Classification system, Mount Hood has a warm-summer Mediterranean climate, abbreviated "Csb" on climate maps.

Climate data for parkdale 1 nne, Longitude: -121.589, Latitude: 45.535 Average weather Mount Hood Parkdale, OR - 97041 - 1981-2010 normals
