= Hood River County, Oregon =

County in Oregon, United States

- County
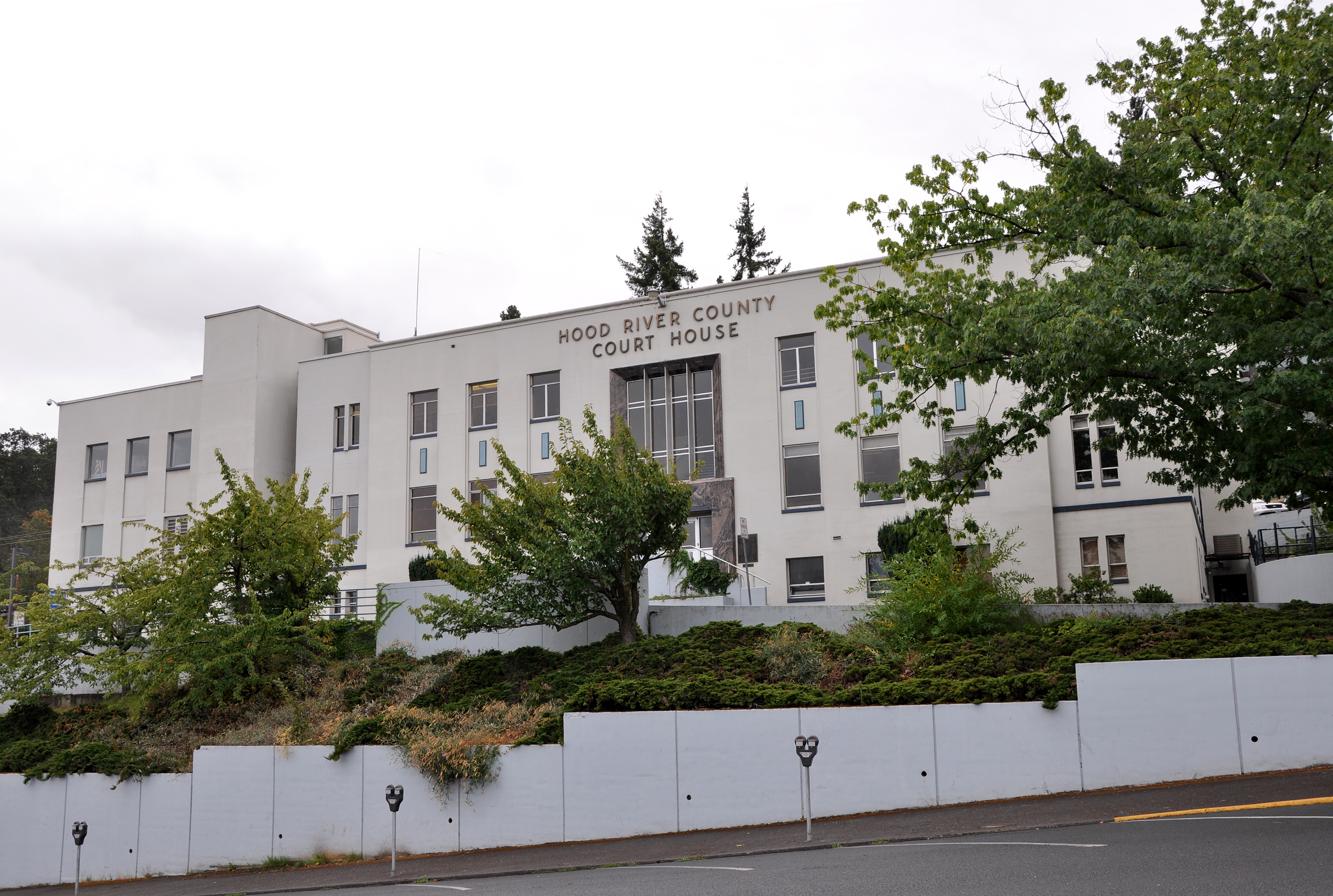
- Hood River County Courthouse in Hood River

- Location within the U.S. state of Oregon
- Coordinates: 45°31′03″N 121°38′58″W
- Country: United States
- State: Oregon
- Founded: June 23, 1908
- Named for: Hood River
- Seat: Hood River
- Largest city: Hood River

Area
  - Total: 533 sq mi (1,380 km^{2})
  - Land: 522 sq mi (1,350 km^{2})
  - Water: 11 sq mi (28 km^{2}) 2.1%

Population (2020)
  - Total: 23,977
  - Estimate (2025): 23,720 ▼
  - Density: 43/sq mi (17/km^{2})
- Time zone: UTC−8 (Pacific)
  - Summer (DST): UTC−7 (PDT)
- Congressional district: 3rd
- Website: hoodrivercounty.gov

Hood River County is one of the 36 counties in the U.S. state of Oregon. As of the 2020 census, the population was 23,977. The county seat is Hood River. The county was established in 1908 and is named for the Hood River, a tributary of the Columbia River. Hood River County comprises the Hood River, OR Micropolitan Statistical Area. The Hood River Valley produces apples, pears, and cherries. Situated between Mount Hood and the Columbia River in the middle of the Columbia River Gorge, Hood River County is a popular destination for outdoor enthusiasts, such as windsurfers, mountain-bikers, skiers, hikers, kayakers, and many more.

== History ==
The first permanent settlers in present-day Hood River County filed a donation land claim in 1854. The first school was built in 1863 and a road from The Dalles was completed in 1867. By 1880 there were 17 families living in the valley. By the latter part of the nineteenth century farmers of Japanese, Finnish, German, and French ethnicity had settled in the valley.

At the turn of the twentieth century, the people of the Hood River region in the northwest portion of Wasco County expressed a desire for political separation from the parent county. The passage of a statewide initiative established Hood River as the thirty-fourth county of the state. It was made official by a governor's proclamation on June 23, 1908. The Columbia River Highway was completed in 1922 from Portland to The Dalles, improving access between both those cities as well as to Hood River.

In response to controversy surrounding county approval of locating a destination resort at Cooper Spur ski area on Mount Hood, on November 5, 2003, 62% of the voters approved a measure requiring voter approval on residential developments of 25 units or more on land zoned for forest use. Opponents claimed that this measure was not enforceable and would end up in court.

== Geography ==
Hood River County is 533 square miles (1,380 km^{2}), of which 522 square miles (1,350 km^{2}) is land and 11 square miles (28 km^{2}) (2.1%) is water. It is the second-smallest county in Oregon by area. Elevation ranges from 60 feet (18 m) above sea level at Cascade Locks in the northwest to 11,235 feet (3,424 m) at the summit of Mount Hood, the highest point in Oregon.

The County lies in a transition zone in the Columbia River Gorge between the temperate rain forest of the Cascade range and dry desert of eastern Oregon. Precipitation varies considerably by longitude and elevation. Annual precipitation averages over 76 inches in Cascade Locks, but is less than 31 inches in the City of Hood River. At the highest reaches of the County on Mount Hood precipitation can be up to 150 inches annually.

The Gorge can have a moderating effect on air temperatures in the County near the Columbia River when maritime air moves in from the west. Major easterly flows, however, can occasionally cause extreme cold conditions as cold air moves west through the Gorge. Winds are generally from the west in the summer, resulting in strong and consistent winds on the Columbia River at Hood River County, making Hood River a world-renowned wind surfing location. Winter winds can blow from either the east or the west and can be of sufficient force to result in widespread damage.

Hood River County contains the entirety of the 217,337 acres (87,953 ha) Hood River watershed, which covers nearly two-thirds of the county. This watershed includes four main sub-basins: the West Fork Hood River, the Middle Fork Hood River, the East Fork Hood River, and the Hood River Mainstem (the lower river and its tributaries).

Sixty percent, or 209,385 acres (84,735 ha), of the county is federal land managed by the Mount Hood National Forest. Another 31,000 acres (13,000 ha), or 8.8 percent, is forestland owned and managed by Hood River County. The State of Oregon owns 3,894 acres (1,576 ha) within the county. Weyerhaeuser Company became a major private landowner in 2013 after purchasing Longview Timber LLC, including its forest holdings in Hood River County. 25,817 acres (10,448 ha), over seven percent of the county, is managed as private farmland. As of 2012 there were 554 farms, with a medium farm size of 19 acres (7.7 ha).

=== Adjacent counties ===
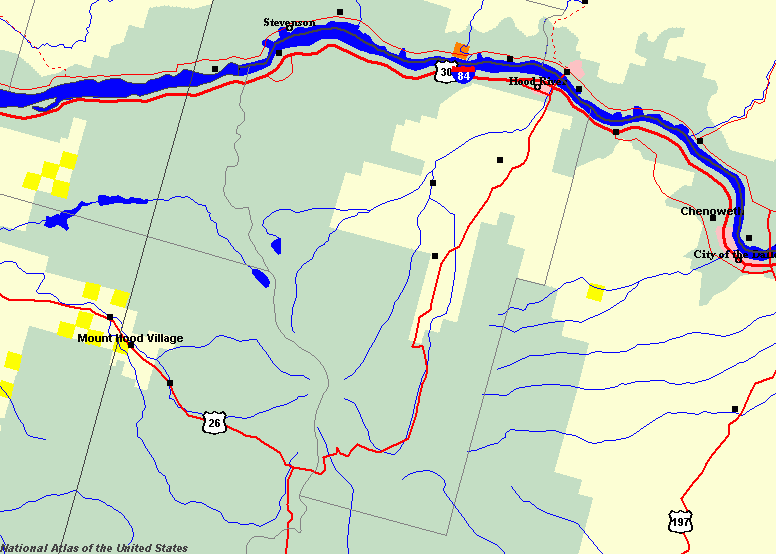
Map of Hood River County U.S. Forest Service land Bureau of Land Management land

- Skamania County, Washington - north
- Klickitat County, Washington - northeast
- Wasco County - southeast
- Clackamas County - southwest
- Multnomah County - west
- Wasco County, Oregon - east

=== National protected areas ===
- Badger Creek Wilderness
- Mark O. Hatfield Wilderness
- Mount Hood Wilderness
- Columbia River Gorge National Scenic Area

== Demographics ==
Historical population
Census	Pop.	Note	%±
1910	8,016		—
1920	8,315		3.7%
1930	8,938		7.5%
1940	11,580		29.6%
1950	12,740		10.0%
1960	13,395		5.1%
1970	13,187		−1.6%
1980	15,835		20.1%
1990	16,903		6.7%
2000	20,411		20.8%
2010	22,346		9.5%
2020	23,977		7.3%
2025 (est.)	23,720	▼	−1.1%
U.S. Decennial Census; 1790–1960 1900–1990; 1990–2000 2010–2020

=== 2020 census ===
As of the 2020 census, the county had a population of 23,977. Of the residents, 23.4% were under the age of 18 and 16.8% were 65 years of age or older; the median age was 40.2 years. For every 100 females there were 98.7 males, and for every 100 females age 18 and over there were 97.5 males. 48.2% of residents lived in urban areas and 51.8% lived in rural areas.

The racial makeup of the county was 68.3% White, 0.2% Black or African American, 1.1% American Indian and Alaska Native, 1.6% Asian, 0.2% Native Hawaiian and Pacific Islander, 13.1% from some other race, and 15.5% from two or more races. Hispanic or Latino residents of any race comprised 29.8% of the population. The table below reports the non-Hispanic breakdown from the same redistricting data.

Hood River County, Oregon – Racial and ethnic composition Note: the US Census treats Hispanic/Latino as an ethnic category. This table excludes Latinos from the racial categories and assigns them to a separate category. Hispanics/Latinos may be of any race.
Race / Ethnicity (NH = Non-Hispanic)	Pop 1980	Pop 1990	Pop 2000	Pop 2010	Pop 2020	% 1980	% 1990	% 2000	% 2010	% 2020
White alone (NH)	14,278	13,628	14,426	14,714	14,935	90.17%	80.62%	70.68%	65.85%	62.29%
Black or African American alone (NH)	38	36	66	63	47	0.24%	0.21%	0.32%	0.28%	0.20%
Native American or Alaska Native alone (NH)	158	186	177	144	149	1.00%	1.10%	0.87%	0.64%	0.62%
Asian alone (NH)	297	284	294	305	381	1.88%	1.68%	1.44%	1.36%	1.59%
Native Hawaiian or Pacific Islander alone (NH)	x	x	18	30	33	x	x	0.09%	0.13%	0.14%
Other race alone (NH)	22	17	31	25	119	0.14%	0.10%	0.15%	0.11%	0.50%
Mixed race or Multiracial (NH)	x	x	292	476	1,165	x	x	1.43%	2.13%	4.86%
Hispanic or Latino (any race)	1,042	2,752	5,107	6,589	7,148	6.58%	16.28%	25.02%	29.49%	29.81%
Total	15,835	16,903	20,411	22,346	23,977	100.00%	100.00%	100.00%	100.00%	100.00%

=== American Community Survey 2025 data ===
The United States Census Bureau estimated that in 2025, Hood River County’s population was 23.720. It was also estimated that the county's population was 61,33% Non-Hispanic White, 31,55% Hispanic or Latino, 0,44% Non-Hispanic Black, 1,70% Asian, 0,74% Native American, 0,14% Pacific Islander, and 4,10% Multiracial.

Total	Population	Percentage
Non-Hispanic White	14.547	61,33%
Hispanic or Latino	7.484	31,55%
Non-Hispanic Black	104	0,44%
Asian	404	1,70%
Native American	175	0,74%
Pacific Islander	34	0,14%
Non-Hispanic Multiracial	972	4,10%

There were 8,965 households in the county, of which 34.4% had children under the age of 18 living with them and 23.8% had a female householder with no spouse or partner present. About 23.7% of all households were made up of individuals and 10.8% had someone living alone who was 65 years of age or older.

There were 10,126 housing units, of which 11.5% were vacant. Among occupied housing units, 65.4% were owner-occupied and 34.6% were renter-occupied. The homeowner vacancy rate was 0.9% and the rental vacancy rate was 4.9%.

=== 2010 census ===
As of the 2010 census, there were 22,346 people, 8,173 households, and 5,659 families residing in the county. The population density was 42.8 inhabitants per square mile (16.5/km^{2}). There were 9,271 housing units at an average density of 17.8 per square mile (6.9/km^{2}). The racial makeup of the county was 83.1% white, 1.4% Asian, 0.8% American Indian, 0.5% black or African American, 0.2% Pacific islander, 10.9% from other races, and 3.2% from two or more races. Those of Hispanic or Latino origin made up 29.5% of the population. In terms of ancestry, 16.7% were German, 10.6% were English, 9.8% were Irish, and 3.8% were American.

Of the 8,173 households, 35.9% had children under the age of 18 living with them, 55.4% were married couples living together, 9.3% had a female householder with no husband present, 30.8% were non-families, and 23.8% of all households were made up of individuals. The average household size was 2.64 and the average family size was 3.14. The median age was 38.0 years.

The median income for a household in the county was $51,307 and the median income for a family was $57,644. Males had a median income of $37,901 versus $31,516 for females. The per capita income for the county was $23,930. About 7.5% of families and 9.5% of the population were below the poverty line, including 9.6% of those under age 18 and 9.1% of those age 65 or over.

=== 2000 census ===
As of the 2000 census, there were 20,411 people, 11.8 percent of a total of 9,271 housing units were vacant. Of the 8,173 occupied housing units, 62.9 percent were owner-occupied.

Median household income was $51,307 and median income for a family was $57,644. As of the 2010 census 2,235 persons, or 10.1 percent of the population, lived in poverty.

Of the 20,258 people in the population that are five years and older, 25.6 percent speak Spanish or Spanish Creole, and 69 percent of this group speak English less than "very well."

== Communities ==
=== Cities ===
- Cascade Locks
- Hood River (county seat)

=== Census-designated places ===
- Mount Hood
- Odell
- Parkdale

=== Unincorporated communities ===
- Clifton
- Dee
- Lenz
- Oak Grove
- Pine Grove
- Rockford
- Summit
- Trout Creek
- Winans
- Wyeth

=== Historical communities ===
- Bloucher
- Conway
- Dukes Valley
- Holstein
- Viento

== Government and infrastructure ==
Hood River is a home rule county with an administrative style of government. The county is governed by an elected board of five commissioners. Four commissioners are elected from four geographic districts, and the chair is elected at large.

The county operates two campgrounds at Toll Bridge Park and Tucker Park. The Forestry Department manages the 31,000 acre County Forest for timber sale revenue and to develop and maintain recreation trails. In fiscal year 2014 gross revenue from County timber sales was $3,851,646 while Forestry Department expenses where $1,049,648. Property taxes generated $3,071,038 in revenue in the same year.

The Northern Oregon Regional Corrections Facility (Norcor), a short-term jail, serves Hood River, Gilliam, Sherman, and Wasco counties.

Hood River County is currently one of 11 counties in Oregon in which therapeutic psilocybin is legal.

=== Presidential and statewide elections ===
Hood River County is a reliable state bellwether, having voted for Oregon's statewide winner in every presidential election since 1948, along with Benton County. The county can be considered an outlier among other rural counties in the state and across the nation, partly due to its close proximity to Portland.

Starting in 1988, Hood River County has become one of Oregon’s most reliably Democratic strongholds, supporting Democratic candidates for president and for statewide office often by wide margins.

In the Oregon House of Representatives, Hood River County is included in the 52nd House District, represented by Jeff Helfrich. In the Oregon State Senate, it is located within the 26th Senate District, which is represented by Christine Drazan. Both Helfrich and Drazan are registered Republicans.

United States presidential election results for Hood River County, Oregon
Year	Republican		Democratic		Third party(ies)	
Year	No.	%	No.	%	No.	%
1908	767	62.16%	359	29.09%	108	8.75%
1912	396	25.05%	519	32.83%	666	42.13%
1916	1,314	48.33%	1,188	43.69%	217	7.98%
1920	1,449	59.95%	761	31.49%	207	8.56%
1924	1,214	48.44%	683	27.25%	609	24.30%
1928	1,806	65.22%	905	32.68%	58	2.09%
1932	1,387	42.60%	1,685	51.75%	184	5.65%
1936	1,249	29.77%	2,759	65.77%	187	4.46%
1940	2,305	49.16%	2,367	50.48%	17	0.36%
1944	2,008	50.05%	1,960	48.85%	44	1.10%
1948	2,134	52.80%	1,761	43.57%	147	3.64%
1952	3,310	62.84%	1,930	36.64%	27	0.51%
1956	3,149	56.29%	2,445	43.71%	0	0.00%
1960	3,103	55.86%	2,450	44.10%	2	0.04%
1964	1,786	32.64%	3,564	65.13%	122	2.23%
1968	2,597	48.84%	2,385	44.86%	335	6.30%
1972	3,152	53.96%	2,330	39.89%	359	6.15%
1976	3,210	48.37%	3,114	46.93%	312	4.70%
1980	3,450	48.65%	2,924	41.23%	718	10.12%
1984	4,531	59.85%	3,022	39.92%	18	0.24%
1988	3,257	48.69%	3,275	48.96%	157	2.35%
1992	2,453	31.28%	3,106	39.61%	2,282	29.10%
1996	2,794	36.89%	3,654	48.24%	1,126	14.87%
2000	3,721	43.53%	4,072	47.63%	756	8.84%
2004	4,124	41.83%	5,587	56.67%	148	1.50%
2008	3,265	33.21%	6,302	64.11%	263	2.68%
2012	3,429	34.85%	6,058	61.58%	351	3.57%
2016	3,272	29.99%	6,510	59.67%	1,128	10.34%
2020	3,955	30.21%	8,764	66.95%	371	2.83%
2024	3,854	30.33%	8,364	65.82%	489	3.85%

== Economy ==
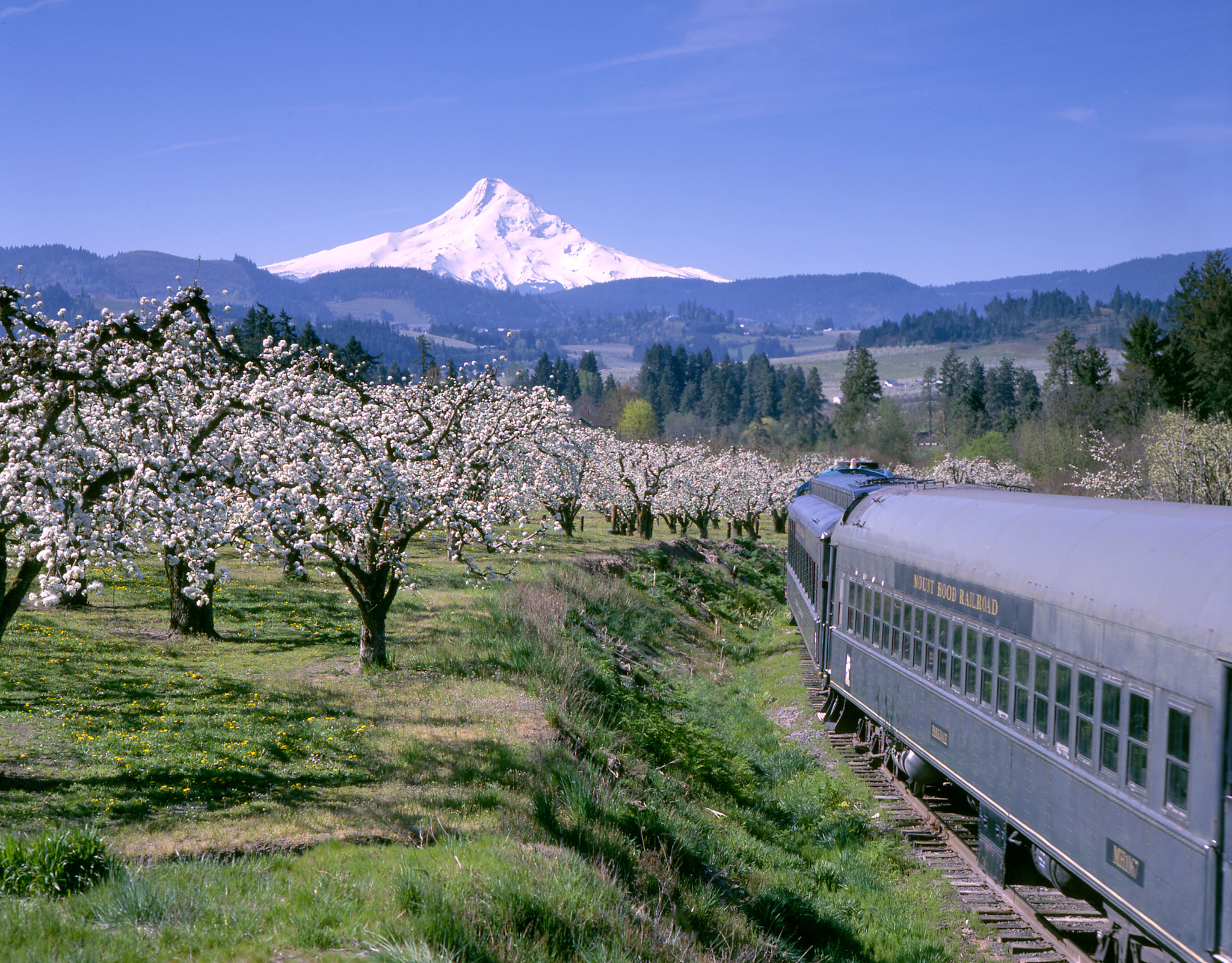
Mount Hood Railroad

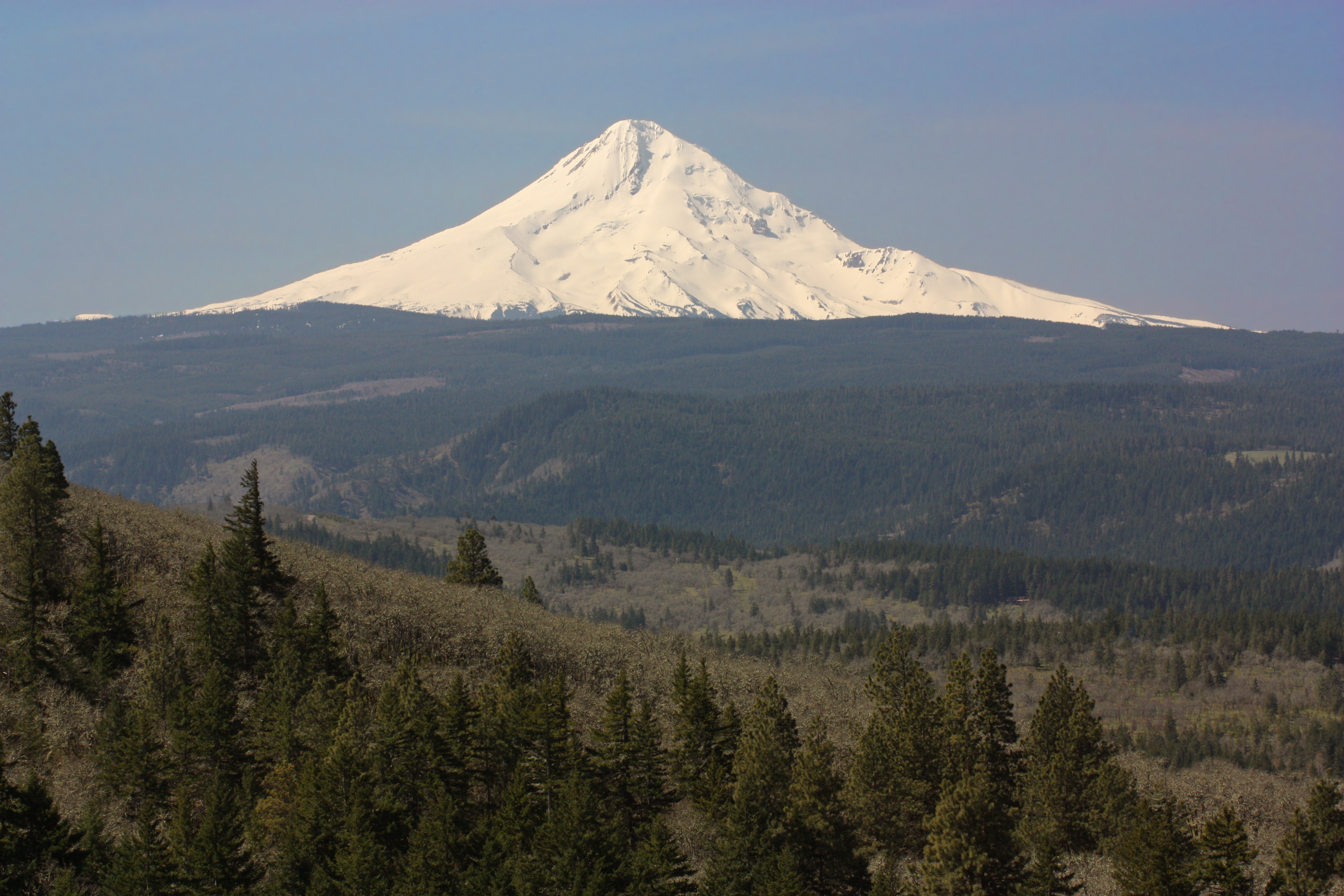
View from McCall Point across Hood River County to Mount Hood

Health Care and Social Assistance was the largest major NAICS industry sector in Hood River County in 2013, with 14 percent of earnings. Manufacturing, at 12 percent, was the second largest sector. Farm Earnings combined with Forestry, Fishing and Related Activities represented nearly 11 percent of earnings. The Professional, Scientific, and Technical Services sector, while accounting for seven percent of earnings in 2013, was the fastest growing sector between 2002 and 2013, growing at an average annual rate of over 11 percent, and increasing its relative share of total earnings by 6.45 percent. Earnings in the Health Care and Social Assistance sector grew at an average of over five percent per year during that period.

Despite a relatively small share of total earnings, farming, forestry and tourism are all important economic drivers in Hood River County. In 2013, Farm Earnings and Forestry, Fishing and Related Activities had location quotients of 8.57 percent and 12.09 percent, respectively, indicating an outsized concentration of these sectors within the county. The Arts, Entertainment, and Recreation industry, while comprising less than four percent of total earnings, had a location quotient of 3.27 percent, the highest of any county in the State of Oregon, indicating a highly concentrated tourism sector.

Agriculture, timber, lumber and recreation are important sources of revenue and industry. Fruit grown in the fertile valley is of such exceptional quality the county leads the world in Anjou pear production. A 1997 census recorded 15,553 acres (62.94 km^{2}) of commercial orchards growing pears, apples, cherries and peaches. Hood River County also has two ports and two boat basins, one serving local barge traffic, a steel boat manufacturing firm and Mid-Columbia yachting interests.

The Columbia River, which runs right by the city of Hood River, has become a premier windsurfing destination, attracting windsurfers from throughout the United States and around the world. Cool, moist coastal air is drawn through the Columbia River Gorge as the desert to the east heats up on warm days, creating winds between 15 and 35 knots most days in the summer. With the current in the Columbia River flowing from east to west, and the wind blowing from west to east, large swells are created on the river that windsurfers enjoy riding like waves. Windsurfing has affected the local economy in many ways: windsurfing-oriented businesses and upscale restaurants catering to visiting windsurfers have reinvigorated the downtown area, many people who first visited Hood River in search of wind and waves have settled in the area and become an integral part of the community, and the local economy has been infused with much needed tourist dollars.

The Mount Hood Railroad provides freight service, connecting with the Union Pacific at Hood River, Oregon, and operates excursion trains and dinner trains on a 22-mile (35 km) rail line running from Hood River to Parkdale. The line was completed in 1909, and operated as an independent company until acquired by Union Pacific Railroad in 1968. In 1987 a local group of investors purchased the line for $600,000, naming it the Mount Hood Railroad. In 2008 Mount Hood Railroad was acquired by Iowa Pacific Holdings, based in Chicago. The company leases storage on its lines for excess freight cars, in addition to, or at times in place of, operating recreational rides.

== See also ==
- National Register of Historic Places listings in Hood River County, Oregon
