= Odell, Oregon =

Unincorporated community in the state of Oregon, United States

- Census-designated place (CDP)
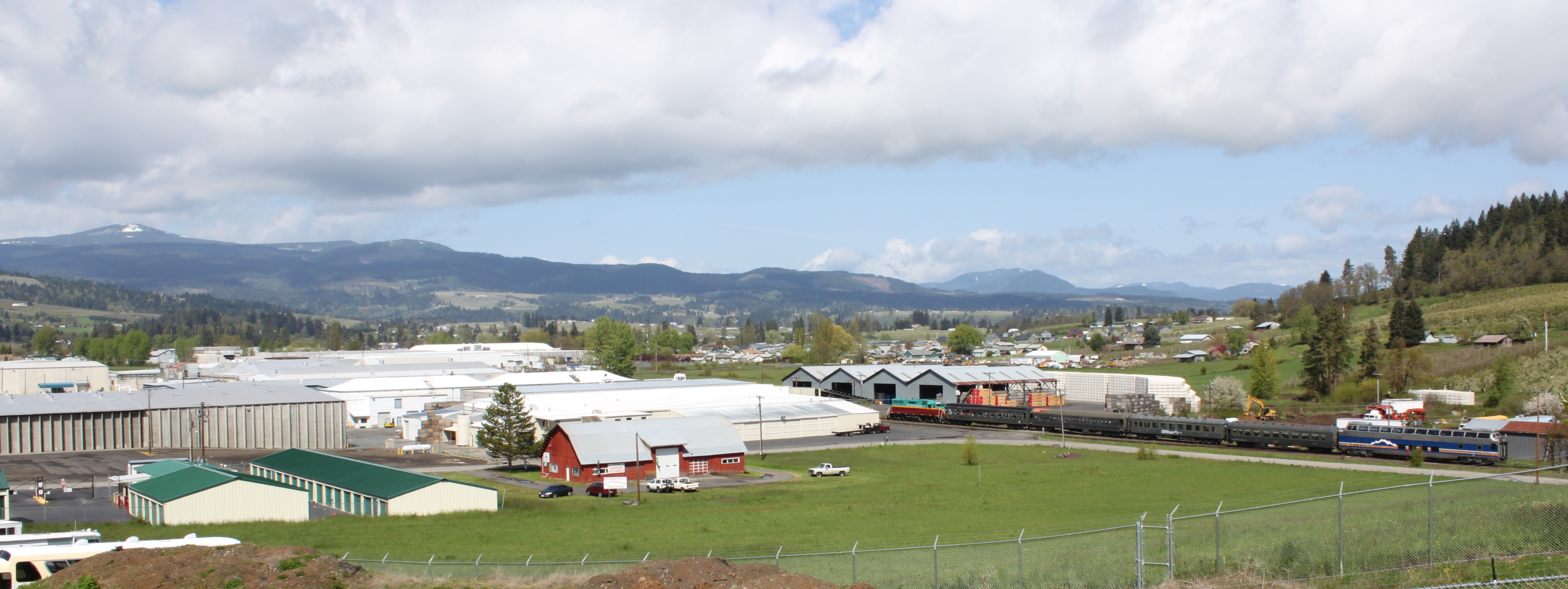
- Odell with the Mount Hood Railroad

- Location of Odell, Oregon
- Coordinates: 45°37′47″N 121°32′44″W
- Country: United States
- State: Oregon
- County: Hood River

Area
  - Total: 2.02 sq mi (5.23 km^{2})
  - Land: 2.02 sq mi (5.23 km^{2})
  - Water: 0 sq mi (0.00 km^{2})
- Elevation: 732 ft (223 m)

Population (2020)
  - Total: 2,328
  - Density: 1,153.2/sq mi (445.27/km^{2})
- Time zone: UTC-8 (Pacific (PST))
  - Summer (DST): UTC-7 (PDT)
- ZIP code: 97044
- Area code: 541
- FIPS code: 41-54550
- GNIS feature ID: 2408977

Odell is an unincorporated community and census-designated place (CDP) in Hood River County, Oregon, United States. As of the 2020 census, Odell had a population of 2,328.

== Geography ==
Odell is in northeastern Hood River County, in the valley of Odell Creek, a tributary of the Hood River. It is 7 miles (11 km) south of the city of Hood River, the county seat. According to the United States Census Bureau, the CDP has a total area of 2.0 square miles (5.2 km^{2}), all land.

=== Climate ===
This region experiences warm (but not hot) and dry summers, with no average monthly temperatures above 71.6 °F. According to the Köppen Climate Classification system, Odell has a warm-summer Mediterranean climate, abbreviated "Csb" on climate maps.

== Demographics ==
Historical population
Census	Pop.	Note	%±
2020	2,328		—
U.S. Decennial Census

As of the census of 2000, there were 1,849 people, 573 households, and 468 families residing in this unincorporated community. The population density was 923.2 inhabitants per square mile (356.4/km^{2}). There were 594 housing units at an average density of 296.6 per square mile (114.5/km^{2}). The racial makeup of this unincorporated community was 66.47% White, 0.49% Black or African American, 0.87% Native American, 0.43% Asian, 29.58% from other races, and 2.16% from two or more races. Hispanic or Latino of any race were 40.02% of the population.

There were 573 households, out of which 45.2% had children under the age of 18 living with them, 68.4% were married couples living together, 8.4% had a female householder with no husband present, and 18.2% were non-families. 14.1% of all households were made up of individuals, and 7.2% had someone living alone who was 65 years of age or older. The average household size was 3.19 and the average family size was 3.51.

In this unincorporated community the population was spread out, with 33.9% under the age of 18, 8.7% from 18 to 24, 29.9% from 25 to 44, 18.0% from 45 to 64, and 9.6% who were 65 years of age or older. The median age was 30 years. For every 100 females, there were 97.5 males. For every 100 females age 18 and over, there were 97.7 males.

The median income for a household in this unincorporated community was $36,991, and the median income for a family was $37,065. Males had a median income of $30,300 versus $16,983 for females. The per capita income for this unincorporated community was $18,023. About 11.1% of families and 12.9% of the population were below the poverty line, including 14.6% of those under age 18 and none of those age 65 or over.

== Notable people ==
Baseball player and evangelist Billy Sunday owned a fruit orchard in the Odell area.
