= Hilgard =

Hilgard may refer to:

== People ==
- Ernest Hilgard (1904 - 2001), American psychologist
- Eugene W. Hilgard (1833–1916), pedologist and first dean of the University of California College of Agriculture (1874–1904)
- Ferdinand Heinrich Gustav Hilgard, the birth name of German-born United States journalist and financier Henry Villard (1835-1900)
- Josephine R. Hilgard (1906—1989), American psychologist
- Julius Erasmus Hilgard (1825-1890), fifth superintendent of the United States Coast and Geodetic Survey (1881-1885)
- Theodore Erasmus Hilgard (1790-1873), lawyer and father of Eugene W. and Julius Erasmus

== Places ==
- Hilgard, Oregon, an unincorporated community in Union County
- Hilgard Junction State Recreation Area, a state park in the State of Oregon in the United States
- Hilgard Mountain, a mountain in Utah
- Hilgard Peak, the tallest mountain in the Madison Range in the State of Montana in the United States

== Ships ==
- USC&GS Hilgard (1942) a survey ship in commission in the United States Coast and Geodetic Survey from 1942 to 1967

== See also ==
- Hilgardite
