= Warren Creek Falls =

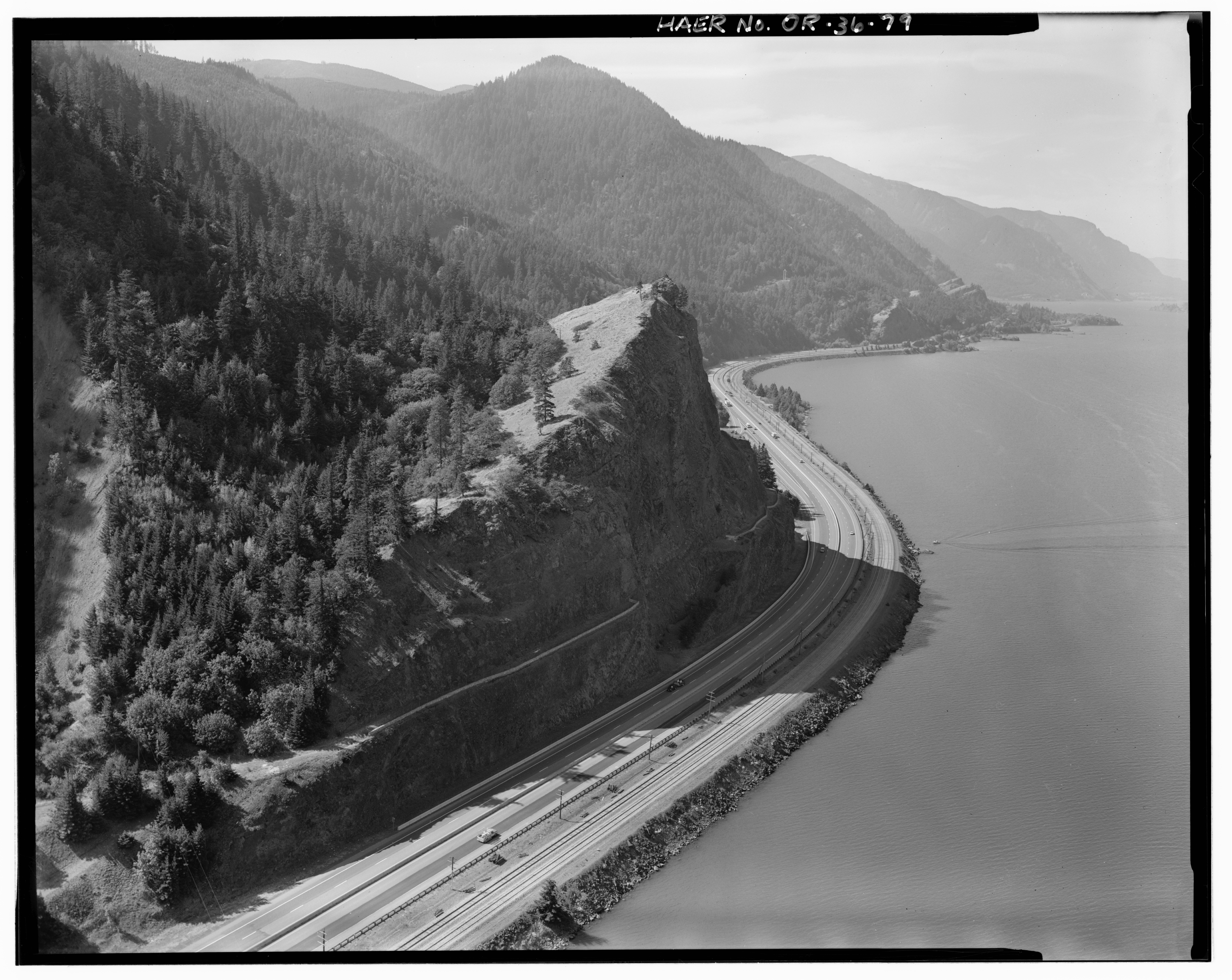
- Historic Columbia River Hwy, at Mitchell Point, the reason for Warren Creek Diversion
- Interactive map of Warren Creek Falls
- Location: Columbia River Gorge
- Coordinates: 45.685633°N 121.701511°W
- Type: Cascade
- Elevation: 220 ft (67 m)

Warren Creek Falls was a waterfall located in Starvation Creek State Park at the north skirt of the Columbia River Gorge, in Hood River County in the U.S. state of Oregon. It was located in a privileged area along the Historic Columbia River Highway, where several waterfalls are located in Starvation Creek State Park, including Cabin Creek Falls, Lancaster Falls, and Starvation Creek Falls—all within 2 miles (3 km) of each other. It is frequently referred to as the name for Hole-in-the-Wall Falls, a few yards downstream of Warren Creek.

The remaining bedrock and its river trail are surrounded by forests in the heart of the Columbia Plateau, off the western skirt of Viento Ridge. When water levels of the diversion tunnel reach over the crest, the overflowing waters run the old natural course of Warren Creek and a stream falls down the old site of the diverted cascade.

== History ==
Warren Creek Falls was formed as a result of the cataclysmic Missoula Floods, also known as Bretz Floods, about 13,000 years ago. In 1938 Warren Creek was diverted through a tunnel to prevent washouts of the newly constructed Columbia River Highway. The creation of the diversion shut off the natural cascade and formed Hole-in-the-Wall Falls downstream.

== See also ==
- List of waterfalls in Oregon
- Viento State Park
