= Interstate 84 in Oregon =

Interstate highway in Oregon

Interstate 84
- Vietnam Veterans Memorial Highway
- I-84 highlighted in red

Route information
- Maintained by ODOT
- Length: 378.01 mi (608.35 km)
- Existed: 1957–present
- History: Completed in 1975
- NHS: Entire route

Major junctions
- West end: I-5 / US 30 in Portland
- I-205 in Portland; US 197 in The Dalles; US 97 in Biggs Junction; I-82 near Hermiston; US 395 in Pendleton
- East end: I-84 at Idaho state line near Ontario

Location
- Country: United States
- State: Oregon
- Counties: Multnomah, Hood River, Wasco, Sherman, Gilliam, Morrow, Umatilla, Union, Baker, Malheur

Highway system
- Interstate Highway System; Main; Auxiliary; Suffixed; Business; Future; Oregon Highways; Interstate; US; State; Named; Scenic
← OR 82	→ OR 86

Interstate 84 (I-84) in the U.S. state of Oregon is a major Interstate Highway that traverses the state from west to east. It is concurrent with U.S. Route 30 (US 30) for most of its length and runs 378 miles (608 km) from an interchange with I-5 in Portland to the Idaho state line near Ontario. The highway roughly follows the Columbia River and historic Oregon Trail in northeastern Oregon, and is designated as part of Columbia River Highway No. 2 and all of the Old Oregon Trail Highway No. 6; the entire length is also designated as the Vietnam Veterans Memorial Highway. I-84 intersects several of the state's main north–south roads, including US 97, US 197, I-82, and US 395.

The freeway serves as the main east–west route through Portland and Gresham and continues into the Columbia River Gorge National Scenic Area. It passes through the cities of Hood River and The Dalles within the gorge and also serves several state parks and natural monuments. Near Pendleton, it leaves the Columbia River and runs southeasterly across the Blue Mountains via La Grande and Baker City. I-84 crosses the Snake River at Ontario, continuing southeast towards Boise, Idaho.

I-84 was established in 1957 and originally carried the designation of Interstate 80N (I-80N) until 1980, when this was changed to I-84 to prevent confusion with the southerly I-80. The earliest sections of the freeway incorporated the existing Banfield Freeway between Portland and Troutdale, opened in 1955, and upgraded other parts of US 30 to Interstate standards. New roads were built through the Columbia River Gorge in the 1960s and across northeastern Oregon in the 1970s. The final section of I-84, near Baker City, was opened to traffic on July 3, 1975.

== Route description ==
Interstate 84 is the longest freeway in Oregon, at over 378 miles (608 km) in length, and is the only Interstate to traverse the state from west to east. The highway connects the Portland metropolitan area to the Columbia River Gorge, the northeastern Columbia Plateau, and part of the Snake River Valley. As a component of the Interstate Highway System, I-84 is also designated as an important national highway under the National Highway System. It is officially named the Vietnam Veterans Memorial Highway and is mostly concurrent with US 30, which also carries part of the Columbia River Highway No. 2 and all of the Old Oregon Trail Highway No. 6 under Oregon's named route system.

I-84 is maintained by the Oregon Department of Transportation (ODOT), who conduct an annual survey of traffic volume that is expressed in terms of annual average daily traffic (AADT), a measure of traffic volume for any average day of the year. The highway is the busiest in Oregon, with a daily average of over 177,000 vehicles in eastern Portland; while the least-traveled section of I-84, south of Baker City, only carries 9,400 vehicles. The highway's route through the Columbia River Gorge is considered one of the most scenic sections of the Interstate Highway System and is visited by 4.5 million tourists annually.

=== Portland area ===
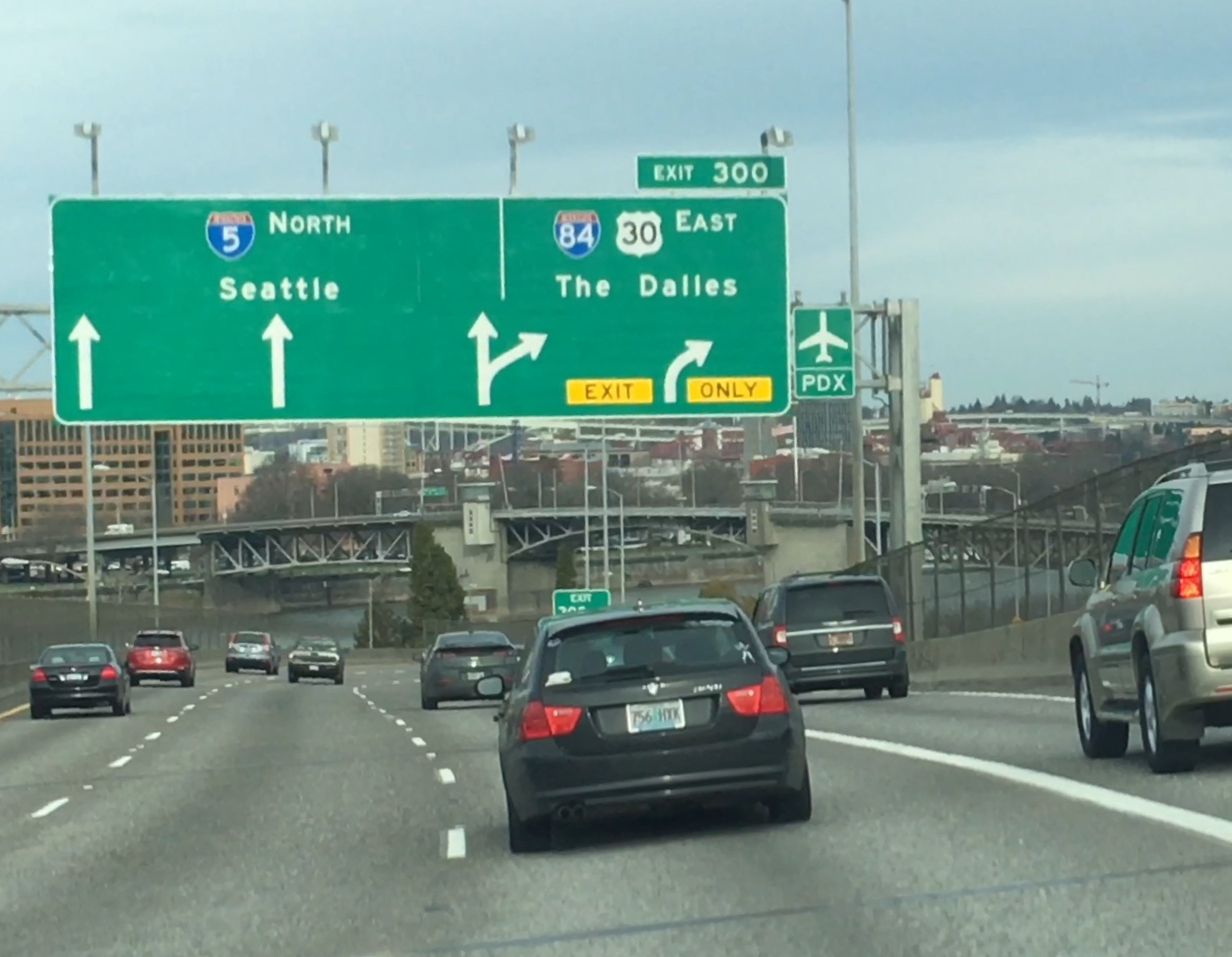
The northbound approach on I-5 near its interchange with I-84 in Portland

Interstate 84 begins across from downtown Portland at an interchange with I-5 on the east bank of the Willamette River, between the Burnside and Steel bridges and adjacent to the Oregon Convention Center complex. The interchange is also the terminus of the Banfield Freeway, officially the T.H. Banfield Expressway, which carries I-84 and US 30 through eastern Portland along a railroad grade. The freeway travels northeast through Sullivan's Gulch, passing under the twin overpasses of Oregon Route 99E (OR 99E), which also carries the Portland Streetcar's Loop lines that serve the Eastside district of the city. At an interchange near the Lloyd Center and Holladay Park, the Banfield Freeway is joined by MAX Light Rail trains, which stop along stations on the north side of the freeway.

I-84 serves several local interchanges, which often lack exits for both directions of the freeway, in the neighborhoods of Kerns, Hollywood, North Tabor, and Madison South while following the meandering gulch. After an interchange with OR 213, the freeway intersects the city's north–south bypass, I-205. The two freeways run parallel to each other for one mile (2 km), with I-205 and the MAX Light Rail tracks to the west, the railroad and a multi-use path in the center, and I-84 on the east, along the east side of Rocky Butte. At Fremont Street, I-84 splits from I-205 and the MAX Light Rail tracks to continue east along Sandy Boulevard (US 30 Bypass) through the city's easternmost suburban neighborhoods. The freeway briefly enters northern Gresham and passes through the neighboring cities of Fairview and Wood Village before reaching Troutdale. It passes north of downtown Troutdale and crosses over the Sandy River near Troutdale Airport, entering the Sandy River Delta nature reserve.

=== Columbia Gorge ===
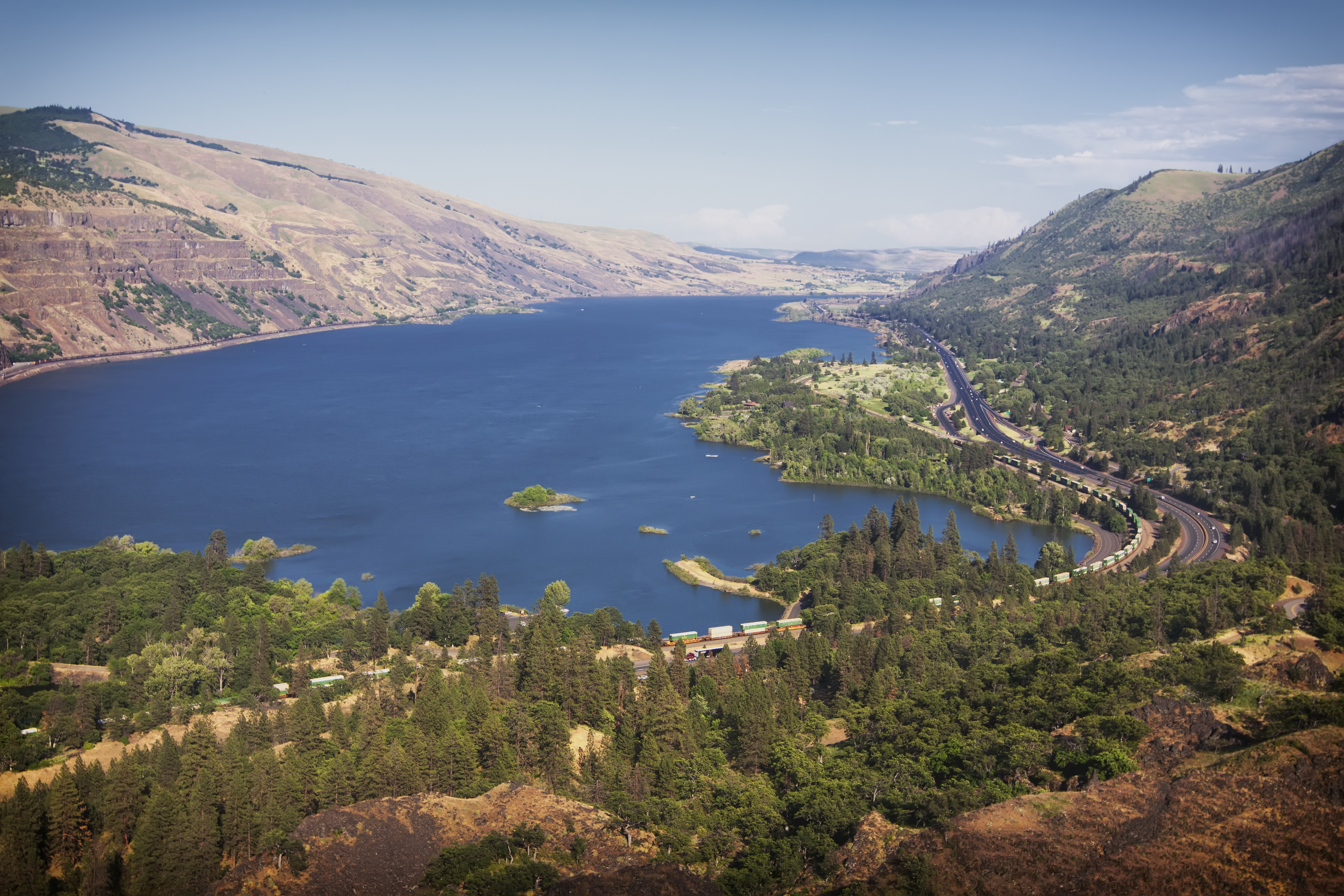
View of I-84 in the Columbia River Gorge, looking east from Rowena Crest

I-84 and US 30 emerge from the park at the south bank of the Columbia River, which it follows into the Columbia Gorge National Scenic Area. The freeway runs east along the foot of the gorge, passing through several state parks and scenic viewpoints connected via the Historic Columbia River Highway, including Multnomah Falls—the second-tallest year-round waterfall in the United States and one of the state's most visited tourist destinations. I-84 runs opposite from Washington State Route 14 (WA 14) on the north bank of the river, which also carries Amtrak's Empire Builder passenger trains, and several large mountains that are visible from the freeway. The highway reaches the Bonneville Dam, where it provides the main access to the visitors center on Bradford Island, and passes three regional fish hatcheries. Adjacent to the dam, the freeway reaches a basalt cliff under Tooth Rock, which it traverses using a tunnel for the eastbound lanes and a viaduct for the westbound lanes that overhangs the river. Further upriver from the dam in Hood River County, I-84 intersects the Bridge of the Gods, a toll bridge near Cascade Locks and the first public crossing of the Columbia River east of the Portland area. The bridge also carries the Pacific Crest Trail, a transcontinental hiking trail that follows the crest of the Cascade and Sierra Nevada mountain ranges.

From the bridge, I-84 briefly leaves the river's edge and travels around the south side of Cascade Locks, while US 30 splits from the freeway and runs through the town. The two highways are rejoined near Cascade Locks State Airport and return to the shore of the river near Government Cove. Near this area, the Confederated Tribes of Warm Springs proposed to build a large casino and resort, which was rejected by various governments several times and abandoned in 2013. I-84 then continues into Hood River, situated in an open valley with a mix of farmland and suburban housing. US 30 leaves the freeway at Cascade Avenue and runs through the city's downtown, which lies just south of the freeway and railroad. The freeway intersects a downtown street on the west side of the Hood River, just north of the city's historic train depot on the Mount Hood Railroad, where excursion trains depart for Parkdale near Mount Hood. Across the river, I-84 is rejoined by US 30 and intersects OR 35, part of the Mount Hood Scenic Byway, at the south end of the Hood River Bridge. The toll bridge crosses the Columbia River and connects Hood River to White Salmon, Washington and has a regular toll of $2 per vehicle. The freeway continues southeast along the Bingen Gap and enters Wasco County near Kobert Beach.

Upon reaching Mosier, US 30 splits from I-84 and travels inland along the Historic Columbia River Highway while I-84 remains near the riverbank, passing through Memaloose State Park. The two highways run parallel to each other and the Union Pacific Railroad through Rowena and turn south while approaching The Dalles. The highways pass the Columbia Gorge Discovery Center & Museum and through the suburban areas of the city, separated from the river by an industrial park that includes a major data center for Google. The freeway returns to the river near downtown The Dalles, crossing southeast over US 30 twice as it remains on city streets. US 30 returns to I-84 east of The Dalles at an intersection with US 197, which travels south towards Bend and north across The Dalles Bridge to WA 14 near Dallesport, Washington. The freeway passes The Dalles Dam and continues northeast around the foot of Signal Hill and Kaser Ridge to Celilo Village, where it intersects OR 206. OR 206 continues along the south side of the freeway as both roads cross the Deschutes River into Sherman County and travels southeasterly towards Condon.

The Deschutes River marks the eastern end of the Columbia Gorge National Scenic Area, though the gorge itself continues further northeast through the shrublands of the Columbia Plateau. I-84 and US 30 travel northeast to Biggs Junction, where it intersects US 97 at the south end of the Sam Hill Memorial Bridge, which continues across the river to Maryhill State Park in Maryhill—an early planned community by businessman Sam Hill that features a Stonehenge replica and had the first paved roads in the Northwest. US 97 also continues south from Biggs Junction to Bend and north to Goldendale and Yakima. The freeway continues northeast through Rufus and past the John Day Dam to the John Day River, where it crosses into Gilliam County.

=== Eastern Oregon ===
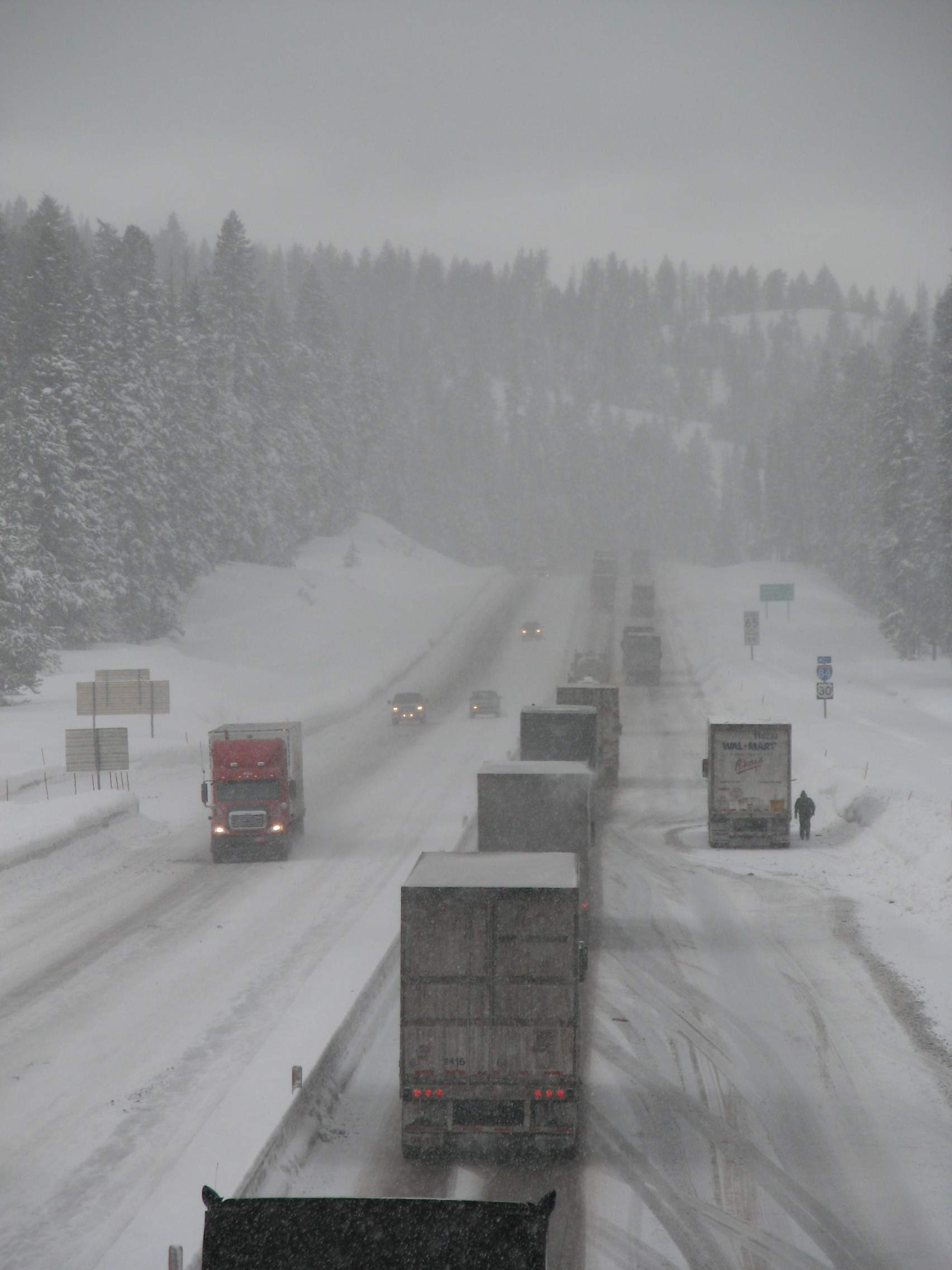
Trucks on a snowy section of I-84 near Meacham, Oregon

I-84 and US 30 continue east along the river, now the expanded Lake Umatilla, and reaches Arlington at the foot of Alkali Canyon. There, it intersects OR 19 in an interchange that is split into two halves by Earl Snell Memorial Park. OR 19 travels south to Columbia Ridge, a major landfill that serves Portland and Seattle, and the John Day Fossil Beds National Monument. From Arlington, I-84 runs northeast along the edge of the Shepherds Flat Wind Farm, the second-largest wind farm in the United States, and intersects OR 74 at Willow Creek. After reaching Morrow County, the terrain opens into wide rangelands, including the Boardman Naval Weapons Training Facility that the freeway passes to the north. I-84 continues through the city of Boardman and turns southeast, leaving the river to intersect US 730 and pass under the Umatilla Army Depot, which is planned to be redeveloped into industrial land and a wildlife refuge.

Formerly a 25,000-acre (10,000 ha) poplar tree farm was planted in rows for 6 miles (9.7 km) along I-84 just east of Boardman and was considered a scenic sight and a community fixture. The trees were cut down in 2016 and other crops were planted.

At the southeast corner of the Army depot near Hermiston in Umatilla County, I-84 intersects the southern terminus of I-82, a freeway connecting northeastern Oregon to Washington's Tri-Cities, Yakima, and I-90. The freeway goes on to intersect OR 27 south of Hermiston and US 395 near Stanfield, forming a concurrency with the latter. From Stanfield, I-84, US 30, and US 395 continue southeast along the Umatilla River and the old Oregon Trail to Pendleton, which lies in a valley formed by the river. West of the city, near the Eastern Oregon Regional Airport, US 30 leaves the concurrency to run through downtown on city streets. After passing the Eastern Oregon Correctional Institution and crossing the river, US 395 splits from I-84 at Southgate, heading south towards John Day. I-84 continues around the south edge of Pendleton and intersects OR 11, a connecting highway to Walla Walla, Washington, before being rejoined by US 30. The freeway travels southeast through a portion of the Umatilla Indian Reservation, passing the on-reservation resort casino, and begins its ascent into the Blue Mountains.

The easternmost 168 miles (270 km) of I-84 includes several sharp curves and steep grades, along with winter weather that causes frequent closures and collisions. The westbound and eastbound lanes are split by a wide median for 8 miles (13 km) as I-84 climbs 3,000 feet (910 m) up a series of switchbacks on Cabbage Hill (also known as Emigrant Hill), which have a maximum grade of 5 to 6 percent. This section of the freeway also has an additional passing lane for uphill travel, runaway truck ramps on descending slopes, chain-up zones, water refills for truck radiators, and variable-message signage for weather conditions. I-84 cuts northeast across Emigrant Hill and turns south after Deadman Pass, traveling towards the Emigrant Springs State Heritage Area near Meacham, located in the Umatilla National Forest. Near Kamela, I-84 crosses the Blue Mountain summit, the second highest point of any freeway in the state at 4,193 feet (1,278 m) above sea level.

I-84 descends from the central Blue Mountains along Railroad Canyon, named for the Union Pacific line that runs through it, and reaches a junction with OR 244 at Hilgard Junction. From Hilgard, the highway travels east along the meandering Grande Ronde River to La Grande, seat of Union County and home to Eastern Oregon University. US 30 splits from I-84 and runs through downtown, while I-84 bypasses the city on its northeast side, crossing over the Grande Ronde River and intersecting OR 82. I-84 and US 30 are reunited southeast of the city at an interchange with OR 203, just west of the La Grande/Union County Airport. The freeway continues south through the Grande Ronde Valley to Ladd Canyon, which it follows while gently ascending part of Craig Mountain at the edge of the Wallowa-Whitman National Forest. I-84 then descends into a wide valley and splits from US 30 at an interchange with OR 237 in North Powder. The two highways continue south into Baker County, but are separated by the Powder River and Coyote Point. I-84 intersects OR 86 and the south end of OR 203 near Baker City Municipal Airport, at the edge of Baker City.

The freeway passes the east side of Baker City, intersecting OR 7, and continues south through a cut in the city's southeastern hill. I-84 and US 30 are rejoined and follow Sutton and Alder creeks southeast through Pleasant Valley, an area notorious for inclement weather due to its microclimate. The surrounding area is marked by gravel mines and dry shrubland that runs over the ridges formed by various streams. At Durkee, the freeway begins to follow the Burnt River, passing Rattlesnake Springs State Park, Weatherby, and Lime. I-84 leaves the Burnt River valley west of Huntington and continues southeast to the Farewell Bend State Recreation Area in northeastern Malheur County, where it briefly follows the Snake River. The freeway leaves the river at an interchange with OR 201 near Huffman Island and continues southeast across several cuts and embankments dug into an arm of the Blue Mountains. I-84 continues into the Payette Valley and intersects OR 201 (co-signed with US 30 Business) in the northern outskirts of Ontario. The freeway continues along the Snake River, bypassing downtown Ontario to the north, and reaches an interchange with Idaho Avenue, where US 30 splits to cross into Fruitland, Idaho. I-84 travels south and passes Ontario's northbound welcome center, which receives up to 55,000 visitors annually, before crossing the Snake River into Idaho west of Fruitland. Within Idaho, I-84 travels east into the Treasure Valley (including Boise) and Magic Valley before continuing on towards Salt Lake City, Utah.

== History ==
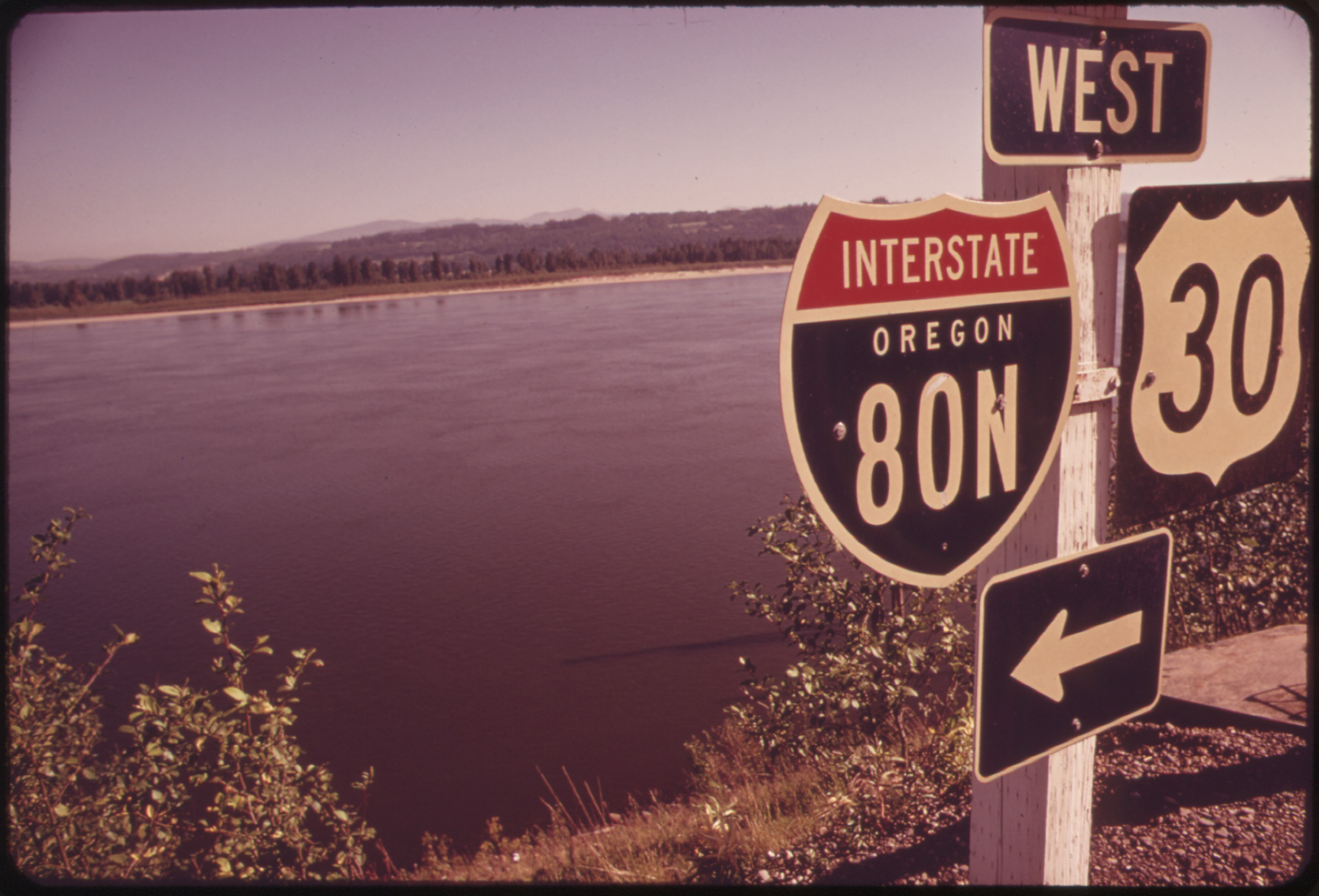
An Interstate 80N shield seen at Corbett in 1973

The Columbia River Gorge and overland crossing between The Dalles and Idaho were originally part of the Oregon Trail during the 19th century. The gorge itself was traversed via boat until the construction of a wagon road in the 1870s that was upgraded to a water-level route that opened in 1882. The wagon roads were replaced by the Columbia River Highway, built from 1913 to 1922 and paved with asphaltic concrete. The gorge road was incorporated into a longer highway from Astoria to Pendleton designated as Columbia River Highway No. 2 in 1917 as part of Oregon's first state highway system. The new system also included Old Oregon Trail Highway No. 6, which followed the historic Oregon Trail from Pendleton to Ontario on the Idaho state border, passing through La Grande and Baker City. The two highways were signed as US 30 under the national numbered highway system, approved in 1926 by the American Association of State Highway Officials (AASHO).

Improvements to the Columbia River Highway and Old Oregon Trail Highway had been planned since the early 1930s, primarily centered on a straighter alignment along the river, but World War II delayed further development until 1948. After the state legislature authorized construction of controlled-access highways in 1947, the Columbia River Highway was targeted for major rebuilding to grade-separated standards. The Oregon State Highway Division started rebuilding parts of the highway segment by segment beginning in 1948 as bond funding became available, and completed the "water level" route in 1954. One of the segments completed in the early 1950s was the Banfield Expressway in Portland.

After the passing of the Federal Interstate and Defense Highways Act in 1956, US 30 was scheduled to be superseded by a new freeway, on an alignment closer to the river on flat terrain. The segment between Portland and The Dalles was mostly complete by 1963, but it would take until 1968 for construction of the highway to meet Interstate highway standards. Several sections of the Historic Columbia River Highway were destroyed to accommodate the wider highway, including the iconic Mitchell Point Tunnel. Further work on the section in the eastern gorge, from The Dalles to Pendleton, began in the 1950s and was completed in 1964. Construction on the remaining segment between Pendleton and Ontario began in 1965 and continued until July 3, 1975, when the final section of I-84 opened near Baker City.

The highway was initially designated in 1957 as Interstate 82, but was renumbered as Interstate 80N in 1958 to correspond with US 30 and give Oregon a "transcontinental" number. Oregon leaders had originally requested the designation of Interstate 80, but accepted I-80N as a compromise. It remained as Interstate 80N until May 1, 1980, when it was changed to Interstate 84 to eliminate confusion with the western section of the non-suffixed I-80, which split from I-80N northeast of Salt Lake City and continued west to San Francisco. The changing of signs in Oregon cost $140,000 and was funded by the federal government, which approved the change in 1979.

The entire highway was dedicated as the Vietnam Veterans Memorial Highway in September 2014 by the state legislature, joining a similar designation in Idaho.

In November 2016, ODOT activated a variable speed zone on a 30-mile (48 km) stretch of Interstate 84 between Baker City and Ladd Canyon. The new electronic signs collect data regarding temperature, skid resistance, and average motorist speed to determine the most effective speed limit for the area before presenting the limit on the sign.

=== Banfield Freeway ===
The T.H. Banfield Expressway, commonly known as the Banfield Freeway, is the portion of Interstate 84 between its western terminus at Interstate 5 and its intersection at Interstate 205 in Portland, Oregon, United States. The expressway, originally built as part of US 30, is named for Thomas H. "Harry" Banfield (1885–1950), a former Oregon State Highway commissioner.

Prior to the creation of the Banfield, surface streets were the only routes from Portland to the country. Under President Dwight D. Eisenhower, the federal government had started providing federal assistance to expressway projects. As a result, planners designed a freeway system in Portland. The first step in building this new freeway system was to construct the Banfield, which would stretch from Portland to Troutdale. The first section of the Banfield Expressway from Northeast 42nd Street to Troutdale opened on October 1, 1955, as Oregon's first freeway. The full length, stretching 13 miles (21 km) from the Burnside Bridge to Troutdale, opened on January 24, 1958, with the completion of the section west of Northeast 42nd Avenue. The section through Sullivan's Gulch had been used by the Union Pacific Railroad beginning in 1882 and had a 40-to-100-foot (12 to 30 m) right of way for use by the freeway.

I-80N was planned to be moved from the Banfield, which did not meet full Interstate standards, to the Mount Hood Freeway under planning in the 1960s. The freeway would have connected to I-5 near the Marquam Bridge and run through southeastern Portland to I-205, requiring a concurrency to reach the Banfield near Parkrose. The proposal was later cancelled in 1974.

A pair of time-limited high-occupancy vehicle lanes were installed in December 1975 at an approximate cost of $500,000. They were available for buses and passenger vehicles with three or more occupants. The westbound lane was 1.7 miles (2.7 km) long and open 6:30 to 9:30 a.m.; the eastbound lane was 3.3 miles (5.3 km) and open from 3:30 to 6:30 p.m. In 1977, the lane had a passenger volume of 1,075 people in the peak hour of traffic with an average of 2.81 people per rideshare vehicle, compared to 2,272 passengers per hour and 1.18 passengers per car for the regular lanes. The lane was calculated to have 88 percent excess capacity in the peak hour of traffic, remaining relatively open. A report noted a 12 percent violation rate of the HOV lane and that enforcement of the lane was difficult because there was no shoulder for police to pull over a driver. The HOV lane was removed in 1982 for the start of freeway widening work and TriMet MAX construction.

The highway was widened to eight lanes during the 1980s, and the MAX Light Rail's Blue Line was added along the north side at the same time in 1986. Construction of the widened freeway and light rail line required the demolition and replacement of twelve overpasses and the closure of several ramps.

The Portland Bureau of Transportation built a 470-foot (140 m) pedestrian and bicycle bridge over a section of the Banfield Expressway in the early 2020s. The bridge, named the Earl Blumenauer Bicycle and Pedestrian Bridge, connects two ends of Northeast 7th Avenue (near Grand Avenue) between East Portland and the Lloyd District. It opened in July 2022 and cost $13.7 million to construct.

== Exit list ==
Note: Mileposts do not reflect actual mileage due to a gap. (Note: Specifically, there is a gap of 2.31 miles (3.72 km) in posted mileage between 7.40 to 9.71.)

County	Location	mi	km	Exit	Destinations	Notes
Multnomah	Portland	0.00	0.00	—	I-5 north / US 30 west – Seattle	West end of US 30 concurrency; westbound exit and eastbound entrance
Multnomah	Portland	0.19	0.31	—	Convention Center, Moda Center	Westbound exit only
Multnomah	Portland	0.37	0.60	—	I-5 south – Beaverton, Salem, OMSI, City Center	Westbound exit and eastbound entrance
Multnomah	Portland	0.66	1.06	—	OR 99E north (Grand Avenue)	Eastbound entrance only
Multnomah	Portland	1.19	1.92	1	Lloyd Center	Westbound exit and eastbound entrance
Multnomah	Portland	2.19	3.52	1	33rd Avenue	Eastbound exit and westbound entrance
Multnomah	Portland	2.57	4.14	2	César E. Chávez Boulevard	Eastbound exit and entrance
Multnomah	Portland	3.01	4.84	2	43rd Avenue	Westbound exit only; westbound entrance from Sandy Boulevard
Multnomah	Portland	3.49	5.62	3	58th Avenue	No westbound exit
Multnomah	Portland	4.29	6.90	4	68th Avenue	Eastbound exit only
Multnomah	Portland	5.03	8.10	5	OR 213 (82nd Avenue)	Eastbound exit and westbound entrance
Multnomah	Portland	5.45	8.77	6	I-205 south – Salem	Eastbound exit and westbound entrance
Multnomah	Portland	5.73	9.22	7	Halsey Street	Eastbound exit only
Multnomah	Portland	6.59	10.61	8	I-205 north / Lewis and Clark Trail – Seattle, Portland Airport	Eastbound exit only
Multnomah	Portland	6.72	10.81	9	102nd Avenue	Eastbound exit and westbound entrance
Multnomah	Portland	7.22	11.62	9	I-205 – Salem, Seattle	Westbound left exit and eastbound left entrance
Multnomah	Portland	10.08	16.22	10	122nd Avenue	Eastbound exit and entrance
Multnomah	Gresham	13.04	20.99	13	181st Avenue / Airport Way – Gresham	
Multnomah	Fairview	14.42	23.21	14	Fairview Parkway (207th Avenue)	
Multnomah	Wood Village	15.96	25.69	16	238th Drive – Wood Village	
Multnomah	Troutdale	16.65– 17.56	26.80– 28.26	17	Marine Drive / 257th Avenue	
Multnomah		17.85	28.73	18	Lewis and Clark State Park, Oxbow Regional Park	
Multnomah		22.12	35.60	22	Corbett	
Multnomah		24.97	40.19	25	Rooster Rock State Park	
Multnomah		28.10	45.22	28	Historic Columbia River Highway – Bridal Veil	Eastbound exit and westbound entrance
Multnomah		29.47	47.43	29	Dalton Point	Westbound exit and entrance
Multnomah		30.56	49.18	30	Benson State Recreation Area	Eastbound exit and entrance
Multnomah		31.17– 31.54	50.16– 50.76	31	Multnomah Falls	Left exit and entrance
Multnomah		35.16	56.58	35	Historic Columbia River Highway – Ainsworth State Park	
Multnomah		37.64	60.58	37	Warrendale	Westbound exit and eastbound entrance
Multnomah		40.27	64.81	40	Bonneville Dam National Historic Landmark	
Multnomah		41.43	66.68	41	Eagle Creek National Fish Hatchery, Eagle Creek Recreation Area	Eastbound exit and entrance
Hood River	Cascade Locks	43.62	70.20	44	US 30 east – Cascade Locks, Stevenson	East end of US 30 concurrency; eastbound exit and westbound entrance
Hood River	Cascade Locks	45.02	72.45	44	Weigh Station	No westbound entrance; exit unnumbered eastbound
Hood River	Cascade Locks	45.02	72.45	44	US 30 west – Cascade Locks	West end of US 30 concurrency; no westbound entrance
Hood River		47.32	76.15	47	Forest Lane – Herman Creek	Westbound exit and eastbound entrance
Hood River	Wyeth	51.01	82.09	51	Wyeth	
Hood River		54.77	88.14	55	Starvation Creek Trailhead, Historic Columbia River Highway State Trail	Eastbound exit and entrance; no trucks
Hood River		56.06	90.22	56	Viento State Park	
Hood River		58.35	93.91	58	Mitchell Point Overlook	Eastbound exit and entrance
Hood River		59.98	96.53	—	Mitchell Point Drive	Westbound exit and eastbound entrance; exit unsigned
Hood River		60.79	97.83	—	Morton Road	Westbound exit and entrance; exit unsigned
Hood River	Hood River	62.04	99.84	62	US 30 east / Westcliff Drive – West Hood River	East end of US 30 concurrency
Hood River	Hood River	63.92	102.87	63	Hood River City Center	
Hood River	Hood River	64.44	103.71	64	US 30 west / OR 35 (Mount Hood Highway) – White Salmon, Government Camp	West end of US 30 concurrency
Hood River		65.85	105.98	—	Koberg Beach State Recreation Site	Westbound exit and entrance
Wasco	Mosier	69.78	112.30	69	US 30 east – Mosier	East end of US 30 concurrency
Wasco		76.62	123.31	76	Rowena	
Wasco	The Dalles	82.07	132.08	82	Columbia Gorge Discovery Center, Wasco County Museum	
Wasco	The Dalles	83.45	134.30	83	West The Dalles (US 30)	No eastbound exit
Wasco	The Dalles	84.15	135.43	84	The Dalles City Center, National Historic Districts	Eastbound and westbound exits only
Wasco	The Dalles	85.49	137.58	85	The Dalles City Center	
Wasco	The Dalles	86.99	140.00	87	US 30 west / US 197 – Dufur, Bend	West end of US 30 concurrency
Wasco		88.83	142.96	88	The Dalles Dam	
Wasco		97.15	156.35	97	OR 206 – Celilo Park, Deschutes River State Recreation Area	
Sherman		104.56	168.27	104	US 97 – Yakima, Bend	
Sherman	Rufus	109.95	176.95	109	Rufus, John Day Dam	
Sherman		114.25	183.87	114	LePage Park, John Day River	
Gilliam		123.34	198.50	123	Philippi Canyon	
Gilliam		129.44	208.31	129	Blalock Canyon	
Gilliam		131.04	210.89	131	Woelpern Road	Eastbound exit and westbound entrance
Gilliam	Arlington	137.60– 138.49	221.45– 222.88	137	OR 19 south – Arlington, Condon	
Gilliam		147.36	237.15	147	OR 74 – Ione, Heppner	
Morrow		151.73	244.19	151	Threemile Canyon	
Morrow		159.30	256.37	159	Tower Road	
Morrow	Boardman	164.16	264.19	164	Boardman	
Morrow	Boardman	165.76	266.76	165	Port of Morrow	
Morrow		167.95	270.29	168	US 730 / Lewis and Clark Trail – Irrigon	
Morrow		171.11	275.37	171	Paterson Ferry Road	
Umatilla		177.99	286.45	177	National Guard Training Center	
Umatilla		179.01– 179.86	288.09– 289.46	179	I-82 west – Hermiston, Umatilla, Kennewick	
Umatilla		180.41	290.34	180	Westland Road – Hermiston	
Umatilla		182.86	294.28	182	OR 207 – Hermiston, Lexington	
Umatilla		188.84	303.91	188	US 395 north – Stanfield, Echo, Hermiston	West end of US 395 concurrency
Umatilla		193.54	311.47	193	Echo Road – Lexington	
Umatilla		198.54	319.52	198	Lorenzen Road / McClintock Road	
Umatilla		199.53	321.11	199	Yoakum Road – Stage Gulch	
Umatilla		202.89	326.52	202	Barnhart Road / Airport Road	
Umatilla	Pendleton	207.45	333.86	207	US 30 east – Eastern Oregon Regional Airport, Pendleton City Center, West Pendleton	East end of US 30 concurrency
Umatilla	Pendleton	209.53	337.21	209	US 395 south – Pendleton, John Day	East end of US 395 concurrency
Umatilla	Pendleton	208.63	335.76	210	OR 11 – Pendleton, Milton-Freewater	
Umatilla		213.04	342.85	213	US 30 west – Pendleton City Center, National Historic District	West end of US 30 concurrency; westbound exit and eastbound entrance
Umatilla		216.05	347.70	216	OR 331 – Milton-Freewater, Walla Walla	
Umatilla		224.72	361.65	224	Poverty Flat Road / Old Emigrant Hill Road	
Umatilla		228.94	368.44	228	Deadman Pass	Rest area
Umatilla		233.82– 235.29	376.30– 378.66	234	Emigrant Springs State Park	
Umatilla		238.76	384.25	238	Meacham, Kamela	
Umatilla		243.82	392.39	243	Summit Road – Mt. Emily	
Union		248.94	400.63	248	Spring Creek Road – Kamela	
Union		252.82	406.87	252	OR 244 – Starkey, Ukiah	
Union		256.38	412.60	256	Perry	Eastbound exit and westbound entrance
Union		257.23	413.97	257	Perry	Westbound exit and eastbound entrance
Union		259.33	417.35	259	US 30 east – La Grande	East end of concurrency with US 30; eastbound exit and westbound entrance
Union	La Grande	261.84	421.39	261	OR 82 – La Grande, Elgin	
Union		264.93	426.36	265	US 30 west / OR 203 – La Grande, Union	West end of concurrency with US 30
Union		268.26	431.72	268	Foothill Road	
Union		270.86	435.91	270	Ladd Creek Road	Eastbound exit and westbound entrance
Union		273.91	440.82	273	Frontage Road	
Union		278.64	448.43	278	Clover Creek	
Union		283.64	456.47	283	Wolf Creek Lane	
Union	North Powder	285.68	459.76	285	US 30 east / OR 237 – North Powder, Haines, Union	East end of US 30 concurrency
Baker		298.68	480.68	298	OR 203 – Baker City Airport, Medical Springs, Haines	
Baker		302.71	487.16	302	OR 86 east – North Baker City, Richland, Hells Canyon	
Baker	Baker City	304.14	489.47	304	OR 7 south – Geiser Grand Hotel, Baker City Center, Historic District	
Baker		306.57	493.38	306	US 30 west – Baker City, Haines	West end of US 30 concurrency
Baker		313.63	504.74	313	Pleasant Valley	Eastbound exit and westbound entrance
Baker		317.48	510.93	317	Pleasant Valley	Westbound exit and eastbound entrance
Baker		327.43	526.95	327	Durkee	
Baker		330.68	532.18	330	Cement Plant Road / Plano Road	
Baker		335.76	540.35	335	Weatherby	
Baker		338.07	544.07	338	Lookout Mountain	
Baker		340.42	547.85	340	Rye Valley	
Baker		342.91	551.86	342	Lime	Eastbound exit and westbound entrance
Baker		345.82	556.54	345	US 30 Bus. – Huntington, Lime	
Malheur		353.05	568.18	353	US 30 Bus. – Huntington	
Malheur		355.77– 356.60	572.56– 573.89	356	OR 201 – Weiser	
Malheur		362.15	582.82	362	Moores Hollow Road	
Malheur		371.43	597.76	371	Stanton Boulevard	
Malheur	Ontario	374.53	602.75	374	OR 201 / US 30 Bus. east to US 20 / US 26 – Ontario, Vale, Weiser	
Malheur	Ontario	376.74	606.30	376A	US 30 Bus. west – Ontario, Treasure Valley Community College	
Malheur	Ontario	376.74	606.30	376B	US 30 east – Fruitland, Payette	East end of US 30 concurrency
Malheur		378.01	608.35	—	I-84 east – Boise	Continuation into Idaho
1.000 mi = 1.609 km; 1.000 km = 0.621 mi: Closed/former; Concurrency terminus; Incomplete access

== Notes ==
Interstate 84
Previous state: Terminus	Oregon	Next state: Idaho
