= Hilgard, Oregon =

Unincorporated community in the state of Oregon, United States

Coordinates: 45.352074°N 118.228002°W

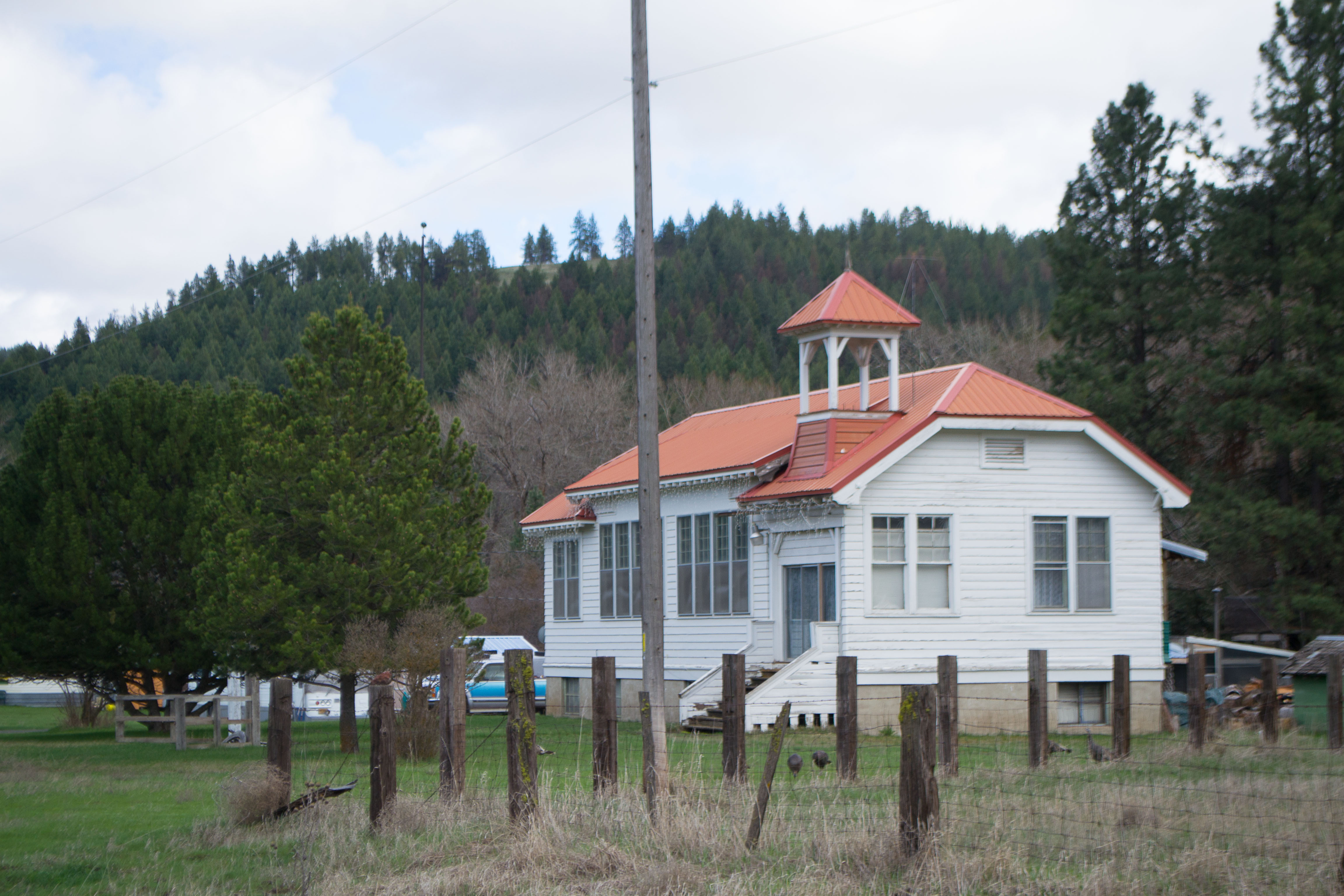
The former school in Hilgard, Oregon

Hilgard is an unincorporated community in Union County, Oregon, United States, at the junction of Oregon Route 244 with Interstate 84/U.S. Route 30, near the Grande Ronde River. It is also the site of a junction (wye) of the Union Pacific Railroad. Hilgard Junction State Recreation Area is across the river from the community.

The Oregon Trail passed through this location, where the covered wagons had to maneuver downhill from La Grande. Most emigrants camped at Hilgard before continuing back uphill towards Emigrant Springs or Meacham.

Hilgard was named for both Eugene W. Hilgard, dean of the College of Agriculture at the University of California, and for Henry Villard, whose name prior to immigrating to the United States was Ferdinand Heinrich Gustav Hilgard. Villard was Hilgard's cousin, and when he built the Oregon Railroad and Navigation Company railroad line over the Blue Mountains, he enlisted Hilgard to make an agricultural survey of the area. In July 1883, a post office named "Dan" was established. The name was changed to "Hilgard" in August of that year when the well-known Eugene Hilgard was in the Pacific Northwest. The office closed in 1943.

In the early 20th century, the Hilgard vicinity had several sawmills. The Mount Emily Lumber Company had a mill there in the 1920s.
