= Starvation Creek Falls =

Waterfall in Columbia River Gorge in Oregon, United States

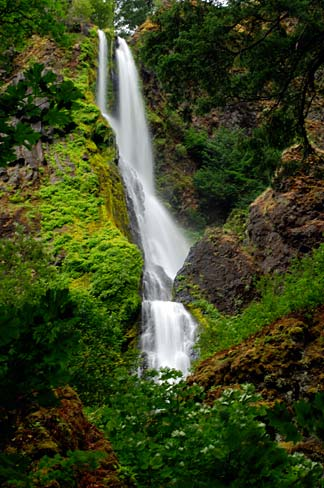
- Starvation Creek Falls in the Summer
- Interactive map of Starvation Creek Falls
- Location: Columbia River Gorge
- Coordinates: 45.68699°N 121.68836°W
- Type: Cascade
- Elevation: 483 ft (147 m)
- Total height: 227
- Number of drops: 2
- Average flow rate: 40 cu ft/s (1.1 m^{3}/s)

Starvation Creek Falls, is a two tier waterfall located in the Starvation Creek State Park at the north skirt of the Columbia River Gorge, in Hood River County, in the U.S. state of Oregon. It is located in a privileged area along the Historic Columbia River Highway, where four waterfalls are located in the Starvation Creek State Park: Cabin Creek Falls, Hole In the Wall Falls, Lancaster Falls, and Starvation Creek Falls—all within 2 miles from each other.

The cascade and its river trail are surrounded by forests in the heart of the Columbia Plateau, off the western skirt of Viento Ridge.

== History ==
The waterfall and the river that forms it were originally named Starveout from an incident in the winter of 1884–1885. Two Union Pacific Railroad trains were marooned in a blizzard for two weeks near the river. Supplies were delivered to the passengers and crew members by skis. The river was thus named starveout and later changed to Starvation Creek.

== See also ==
- List of waterfalls in Oregon
- Viento State Park
