= Hole-in-the-Wall Falls =

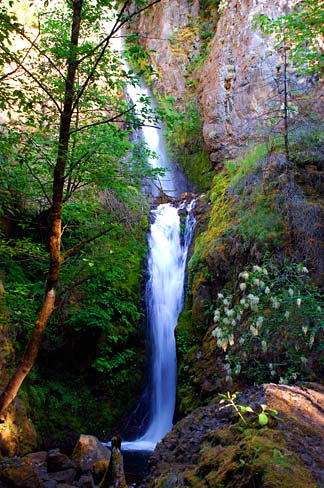
- Hole-in-the-Wall in the summer
- Interactive map of Hole-in-the-Wall Falls
- Location: Starvation Ridge trail
- Coordinates: 45.68616°N 121.70209°W
- Type: Tiered Plunges
- Elevation: 220 ft (67 m)
- Total height: 96 ft (29 m)
- Average flow rate: 35 cu ft/s (1 m^{3}/s)

Hole-in-the-Wall Falls, also known as Warren Falls, is a 96-foot man-made waterfall on Warren Creek in Starvation Creek State Park, Hood River County, Oregon, United States. Its main drop is 60 feet. It was created in 1938 when Warren Creek was diverted through a tunnel (hence its name) to prevent washouts of the Columbia River Highway. The creation of the falls shut off a natural cascade known as Warren Creek Falls named after the creek that formed it.

== See also ==
- List of waterfalls in Oregon
