= Oregon Highway 2 =

There is no present signed highway numbered 2 in the U.S. state of Oregon.

- For the former OR 2, see Oregon Route 2.
- For the unsigned Highway 2, see Columbia River Highway No. 2.
