= Hilgard Junction State Park =

State park in Hilgard, Oregon, United States

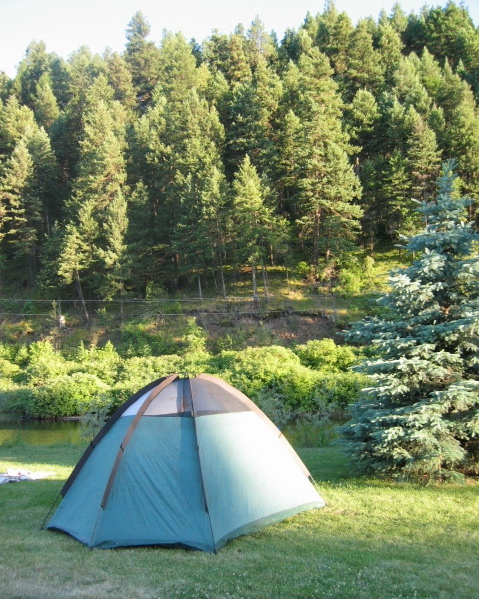
- Campground next to the Grande Ronde River

- Location within Oregon Location within the United States
- Type: Public, state
- Location: Union County, Oregon
- Nearest city: La Grande
- Coordinates: 45°20′24″N 118°14′24″W
- Area: 232.5 acres (0.941 km^{2})
- Operator: Oregon Parks and Recreation Department
- Open: March - October (campground)

Hilgard Junction State Park is a state park in Hilgard, Oregon, United States, administered by the Oregon Parks and Recreation Department. Located along the Grande Ronde River next to Interstate 84 at its intersection with Highway 244, the park has Full RV hook-up sites and tent camp sites with flush toilets and showers nearby.

The park takes its name from a nearby junction of the Union Pacific Railroad line that was named after E. W. Hilgard, former dean of the College of Agriculture of the University of California.

== See also ==
- List of Oregon state parks
