= Hilgard Mountain =

Mountain in Utah, United States

- Location within Utah

Highest point
- Elevation: 11,538 ft (3,517 m) NAVD 88
- Prominence: 2,093 ft (638 m)
- Coordinates: 38°41′03″N 111°32′38″W

Geography
- Location: Sevier County. Utah, U.S.
- Topo map: USGS Hilgard Mountain

Hilgard Mountain is a summit in Sevier County, Utah, in the United States. Its elevation is 11,538 feet (3,517 m) NAVD 88. The summit is in the Fishlake National Forest.

It was named for Julius Erasmus Hilgard, former superintendent of the United States Coast and Geodetic Survey.
