= Meacham, Oregon =

Unincorporated community in the state of Oregon, United States

Meacham
- Unincorporated community
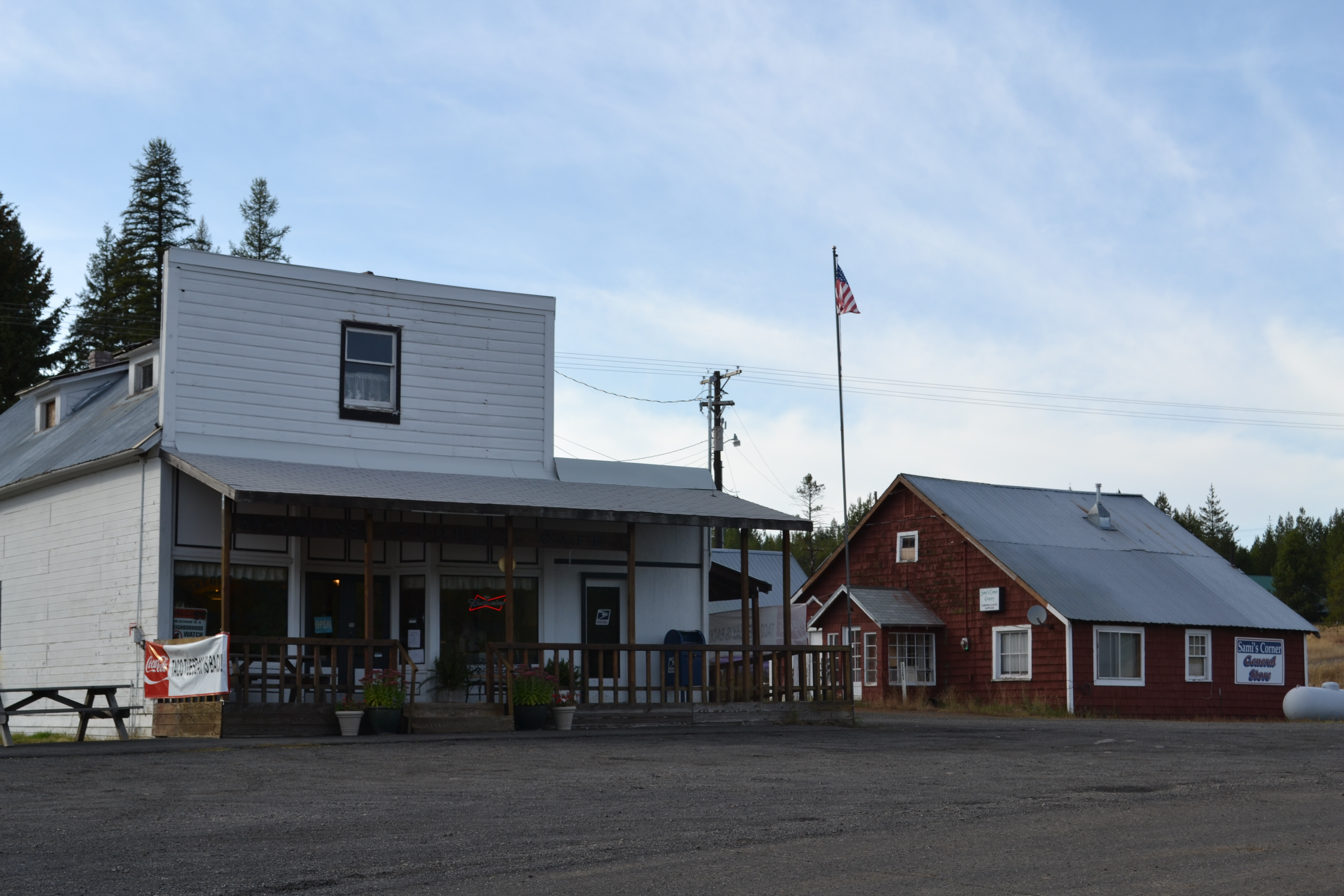

- Location within the state of Oregon Meacham (the United States)
- Coordinates: 45°31′23″N 118°26′22″W
- Country: United States
- State: Oregon
- County: Umatilla

Area
  - Total: 2.27 sq mi (5.87 km^{2})
  - Land: 2.27 sq mi (5.87 km^{2})
  - Water: 0 sq mi (0.00 km^{2})
- Elevation: 3,740 ft (1,140 m)

Population (2020)
  - Total: 85
  - Density: 37.5/sq mi (14.47/km^{2})
- Time zone: UTC-8 (Pacific (PST))
  - Summer (DST): UTC-7 (PDT)
- ZIP code: 97859
- Area codes: 458 and 541
- FIPS code: 41-46800
- GNIS feature ID: 2805457

Meacham is an unincorporated community in Umatilla County, Oregon. It is located on the old alignment of U.S. Route 30 off Interstate 84, in the Umatilla National Forest, near Emigrant Springs State Heritage Area and the route of the Oregon Trail. It is part of the Pendleton–Hermiston Micropolitan Statistical Area. As of the 2020 census, Meacham had a population of 85.

== Demographics ==
Historical population
Census	Pop.	Note	%±
2020	85		—
U.S. Decennial Census

== History ==
Meacham was a station on the Union Pacific Railroad, near the summit of the Blue Mountains. Major Henry A. G. Lee established a troop encampment, called Lee's Encampment, there in 1844. Meacham was named for Harvey J. and Alfred B. Meacham, who operated Meacham Station, a stage station, in the 1860s and 1870s. The first post office in the locality, established in 1862, was named "Encampment". The name was changed to "Meacham" in 1890.

On July 3, 1923, Meacham was visited by President Warren G. Harding, who stopped for the day during his Voyage of Understanding and participated in the exercises commemorating the eightieth anniversary of the Oregon Trail. Harding gave a speech in Pendleton on July 4, commemorating the Oregon Trail, at which time his wife, Florence Harding was presented with a Pendleton blanket shawl in a design that became popular as the "Harding design". According to local tradition, Harding in his speech said (or, as a historic marker tells it, "reporters noted") that the little town of Meacham was the nation's capital "all day long". However, the transcript of the event contains no such declaration.

== Climate ==
Meacham has a dry-summer humid continental climate (Köppen Dsb) with cold snowy winters and mild summers. It was widely reported that Meacham set the state record for lowest recorded temperature in February 1933 at −52 °F (−47 °C). Seneca, in Grant County, however, was colder at −54 °F (−48 °C).

Climate data for Meacham, Oregon, 1991–2020 normals, extremes 1948–present
Month	Jan	Feb	Mar	Apr	May	Jun	Jul	Aug	Sep	Oct	Nov	Dec	Year
Record high °F (°C)	57 (14)	61 (16)	75 (24)	81 (27)	89 (32)	103 (39)	103 (39)	105 (41)	99 (37)	84 (29)	71 (22)	64 (18)	105 (41)
Mean maximum °F (°C)	47.1 (8.4)	51.2 (10.7)	58.3 (14.6)	68.3 (20.2)	78.7 (25.9)	85.1 (29.5)	92.0 (33.3)	91.6 (33.1)	87.1 (30.6)	74.7 (23.7)	58.8 (14.9)	47.6 (8.7)	93.7 (34.3)
Mean daily maximum °F (°C)	36.7 (2.6)	39.9 (4.4)	45.7 (7.6)	52.3 (11.3)	61.0 (16.1)	68.4 (20.2)	78.9 (26.1)	78.6 (25.9)	70.3 (21.3)	56.7 (13.7)	43.3 (6.3)	35.4 (1.9)	55.6 (13.1)
Daily mean °F (°C)	28.8 (−1.8)	30.7 (−0.7)	35.0 (1.7)	40.6 (4.8)	47.7 (8.7)	53.7 (12.1)	60.2 (15.7)	59.1 (15.1)	52.4 (11.3)	43.1 (6.2)	34.5 (1.4)	27.8 (−2.3)	42.8 (6.0)
Mean daily minimum °F (°C)	21.0 (−6.1)	21.5 (−5.8)	24.4 (−4.2)	29.0 (−1.7)	34.4 (1.3)	39.0 (3.9)	41.5 (5.3)	39.6 (4.2)	34.4 (1.3)	29.4 (−1.4)	25.8 (−3.4)	20.2 (−6.6)	30.0 (−1.1)
Mean minimum °F (°C)	−2.5 (−19.2)	3.4 (−15.9)	9.4 (−12.6)	19.5 (−6.9)	25.2 (−3.8)	31.6 (−0.2)	35.3 (1.8)	34.7 (1.5)	28.0 (−2.2)	19.8 (−6.8)	10.2 (−12.1)	0.3 (−17.6)	−10.4 (−23.6)
Record low °F (°C)	−31 (−35)	−25 (−32)	−12 (−24)	5 (−15)	19 (−7)	25 (−4)	29 (−2)	27 (−3)	14 (−10)	−8 (−22)	−19 (−28)	−28 (−33)	−31 (−35)
Average precipitation inches (mm)	4.51 (115)	3.59 (91)	4.09 (104)	3.93 (100)	3.55 (90)	2.19 (56)	0.58 (15)	0.85 (22)	1.21 (31)	2.85 (72)	4.84 (123)	5.15 (131)	37.34 (950)
Average snowfall inches (cm)	32.1 (82)	13.1 (33)	14.0 (36)	8.4 (21)	0.8 (2.0)	0.7 (1.8)	0.0 (0.0)	0.0 (0.0)	0.0 (0.0)	1.8 (4.6)	14.2 (36)	28.1 (71)	113.2 (287.4)
Average precipitation days (≥ 0.01 in)	16.6	15.4	17.3	15.0	13.9	9.4	3.1	4.0	6.0	11.6	15.7	17.6	145.6
Average snowy days (≥ 0.1 in)	9.2	7.4	8.8	4.1	0.8	0.1	0.0	0.0	0.0	0.8	5.1	10.1	46.4
Source 1: NOAA
Source 2: WRCC (mean maxima and minima 1948–2022)
