= Frank Manly Thorn =

American journalist

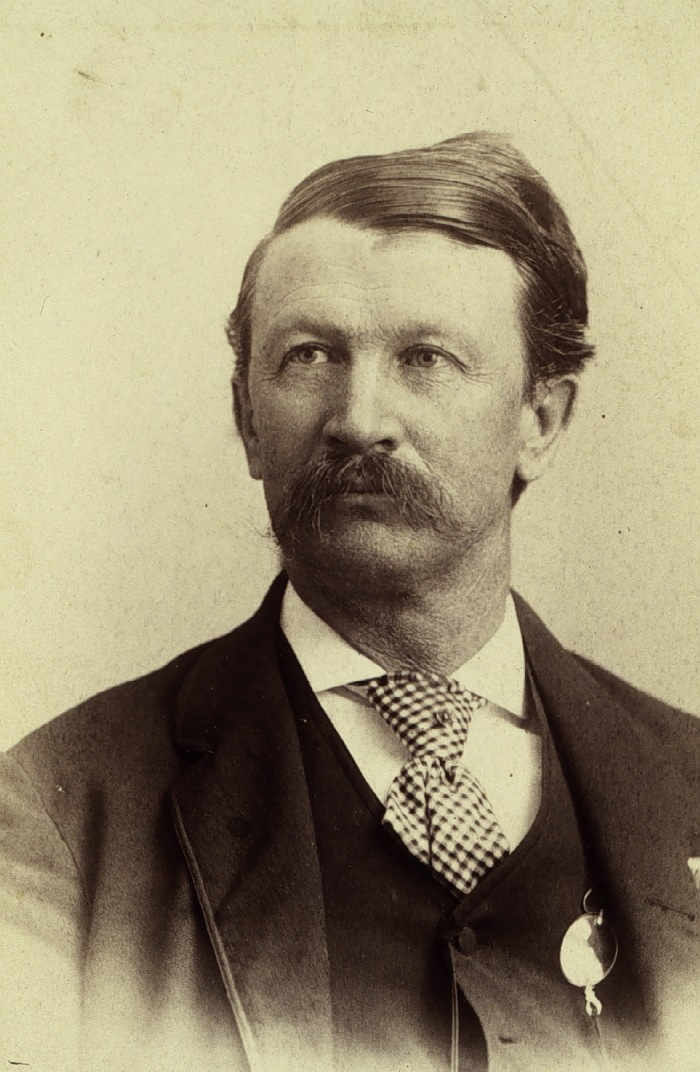

Superintendent, U.S. Coast and Geodetic Survey
- In office September 1, 1885 – June 30, 1889
- President: Grover Cleveland
- Preceded by: Julius Erasmus Hilgard
- Succeeded by: Thomas Corwin Mendenhall

Personal details
- Born: December 7, 1836 Collins (now North Collins), New York
- Died: April 17, 1907 (aged 70) Orchard Park, New York
- Party: Democratic
- Spouse(s): Eola Smith Thorn (1848-1923)
- Education: Fredonia Academy
- Profession: Lawyer, journalist

Frank Manly Thorn (December 7, 1836 – April 14, 1907) was an American lawyer, politician, government official, essayist, journalist, humorist, and inventor. He served as the sixth Superintendent of the United States Coast and Geodetic Survey. The first non-scientist to hold that position, he guided the Coast and Geodetic Survey through a critical period of reform following the exposure of improprieties under his predecessor, and he defended it from being abolished or diminished by its critics.

== Early life ==
Thorn was born in Collins, New York, on December 7, 1836, (Note: Although all sources give Thorn's birth date as "1836," "December 1836," or "December 7, 1836," a photograph of the headstone at his gravesite at Find-A-Grave: Frank Manly Thorn shows that the headstone gives his birth year as 1837, with no other date information.) the son of Abram Thorn and the former Phila M. Pratt; the portion of the town in which he was born later was split off from Collins in 1852 to become the town of North Collins. He attended local schools in Erie County, New York, and then enrolled in the Fredonia Academy in Fredonia, New York. He then attended law school in Albany, New York, and was admitted to the bar to practice law in the State of New York. From 1857 or 1858 (sources vary) to 1860, he was clerk of the Erie County, New York, Surrogate Court. In 1860, he moved to Pennsylvania, where he spent seven years working in the new petroleum industry there.

== Writing career ==
In 1867, Thorn returned to Erie County, New York. He settled in East Hamburg, New York, where he established a successful apple orchard and potato farm. He also began writing sketches and essays and performing as a humorous lecturer and after-dinner speaker. The Buffalo Express newspaper of Buffalo, New York, began to publish his essays under the pseudonym "Hy Slocum," the first of which appeared on March 31, 1868, and discussed the presidential campaign of 1868. The author Samuel Clemens, popularly known as Mark Twain, bought a one-third-interest in the Express in August 1869, and thereafter many readers began to assume incorrectly that "Hy Slocum"'s humorous columns actually were the work of Clemens. The last Slocum article appeared on October 2, 1870, but on November 12, 1870, an article by Thorn under the pseudonym "Carl Byng" was published in the Express, and additional "Byng" articles followed. Other American newspapers reprinted the "Slocum" and "Byng" articles, ascribing them to Clemens.

On January 7, 1871, the literary magazine Every Saturday accused Clemens of plagiarizing its material in a "Byng" article the Express had published on December 2, 1870. Deeply concerned that such mistaken charges of plagiarism would continue to follow him as long as "Slocum" or "Byng" published in the Express, Clemens asked the magazine to retract its accusation and banned "Slocum" and "Byng" from contributing to the newspaper.

Thorn then began contributing articles to the Buffalo Courier, a rival of the Express, under the pseudonym "Frank Clive." In November 1875, Scribner's Monthly reprinted a "Frank Clive" poem that originally had appeared in the Courier on April 18, 1871. After his success in appearing in the prestigious Scribnerʼs Monthly, Thorn dropped his pseudonyms and began writing under his own name.

== Political career ==
In 1870, Thorn was elected to the Erie County Board of Supervisors. Taking office in 1871, he served until 1875 and again from 1877 to 1880. In 1882, he campaigned for Grover Cleveland in Cleveland's successful run to become Governor of New York. Thorn again campaigned for Cleveland when Cleveland successfully ran for President of the United States in 1884. Cleveland took office on March 4, 1885, and rewarded Thorn for his support by appointing him as Chief Clerk of the Internal Revenue Bureau in Washington, D.C. Thorn arrived in Washington in late June 1885 and took up his duties on July 1.

== Coast and Geodetic Survey ==
=== Investigating improprieties ===
The United States Coast and Geodetic Survey, a component at the time of the United States Department of the Treasury, was the United States Government agency responsible for conducting hydrographic surveys of the coastal waters of the United States and generating maps and charts of those waters, as well as for geodetic work in the interior of the United States. As the premiere U.S. Government scientific agency at the time, it had been assigned numerous other scientific responsibilities, such as geophysics and oceanography, and also was responsible for employing its engineering expertise to improvements in communications and transportation. When Thorn arrived in Washington, the Coast and Geodetic Survey had been caught up in the increased scrutiny of U.S. Government agencies by politicians seeking to reform governmental affairs by curbing the spoils system and patronage common among office holders of the time. At the Coast and Geodetic Survey, scientists who were not prone to following bureaucratic requirements related to the funding of their projects, and their lax financial practices, had led to charges of mismanagement of funds and corruption.

The Allison Commission – a joint commission of the United States Senate and United States House of Representatives – had convened in 1884 to investigate the scientific agencies of the U.S. Government, namely the Coast and Geodetic Survey, the United States Geological Survey, the United States Army Signal Corps (responsible for studying and predicting weather at the time), and the United States Navy's United States Hydrographic Office. The commission looked into three main issues: the role of geodesy in the U.S. Government's scientific efforts and whether responsibility for inland geodetics should reside in the U.S. Coast and Geodetic Survey or the U.S. Geological Survey; whether the Coast and Geodetic Survey should be removed from the Department of the Treasury and placed under the control of the United States Department of the Navy, as it had been previously from 1834 to 1836; and whether weather services should reside in a military organization or in the civilian part of the government, raising the broader issue of whether U.S. government scientific agencies of all kinds should be under military or civilian control.

When Cleveland became president in 1885, James Q. Chenoweth became First Auditor of the Department of the Treasury, and he began to investigate improprieties at the U.S. Coast and Geodetic Survey, U.S. Geological Survey, and United States Commission of Fish and Fisheries, more commonly referred to as the U.S. Fish Commission. He had little impact on the Geological Survey or the Fish Commission, but at the Coast and Geodetic Survey he found many improprieties. Chenoweth found that the Coast and Geodetic Survey had failed to account for government equipment it had purchased, continued to pay retired personnel as a way of giving them a pension even though the law did not provide for a pension system, paid employees whether they worked or not, and misused per diem money intended for the expenses of personnel in the field by paying per diem funds to employees who were not in the field as a way of augmenting their very low authorized wages and providing them with fair compensation. Chenoweth saw these practices as embezzlement. Chenoweth also suspected embezzlement in the Survey's practice of providing its employees with money in advance for large and expensive purchases when operating in remote areas because of the Survey's inability to verify that the expenses were legitimate. Moreover, the Superintendent of the Coast and Geodetic Survey, Julius Hilgard, was exposed as a drunkard and forced to resign in disgrace along with four of his senior staff members at Survey headquarters.

On July 1, 1885, his first day as Chief Clerk of the Internal Revenue Bureau, Thorn became chairman of a three-man Department of the Treasury commission investigating the corruption Chenoweth believed he had uncovered in the Survey. Thorn remained with the committee through July 22. With the Survey's leadership in disgrace, Cleveland needed to find an outsider to reform its lax financial practices. He turned to Thorn, who already had met the Coast and Geodetic Survey staff during his three weeks of work on the Treasury committee investigating the organization. Cleveland made Thorn the Acting Superintendent of the Coast and Geodetic Survey on July 23, 1885, only 22 days after be began work for the federal government, and appointed him as its permanent superintendent on September 1, 1885.

=== Superintendency ===
Knowing of the management problems at the Coast and Geodetic Survey, Thorn at first approached its personnel with a degree of hostility, but during his three weeks on the Treasury investigative committee he determined that many of the accusations made against Survey personnel were petty or could not be substantiated, and concluded that in many cases the accusers were motivated by the potential for their own career advancement if they destroyed the careers of others. Upon assuming the superintendency, he quickly concluded that Coast and Geodetic Survey employees were largely innocent of wrongdoing and that he could manage the problems that did exist. He then set his mind to the issues of rebuilding the Survey's integrity and reputation and ensuring that it demonstrated its value to its critics. He knew that the Survey's improper financial and budgetary practices had to end and that increased scrutiny resulting from investigations into the Survey's operations would mean tight budgets in the future.

Thorn was the first non-scientist to be appointed superintendent of the Coast and Geodetic Survey, and Cleveland placed him in the position primarily to reform the lax financial practices that had come to permeate the organization rather than to provide scientific leadership. Thorn knew that he lacked knowledge of Coast and Geodetic Survey operations and the scientific concepts behind them, so he chose as his assistant Benjamin A. Colonna (1843-1925), who had performed extensive field work for the Survey before suffering severe injuries in an avalanche on Mount Olympus in Washington state in 1884, leaving him unable to walk without a cane and restricting him to office work. Colonna had experience in every scientific discipline undertaken in the Survey's operations and he and Thorn formed an effective team, with Colonna handling day-to-day operations of the Survey and any expert testimony required before the Allison Commission while Thorn dealt with the broader issues of restoring the Survey's credibility through sound accounting practices and scrupulously legal budgeting processes and by demonstrating practical value and efficiency in its operations. Thorn urged the agency's employees to set deadlines for maps and charts that they produced to ensure that production was timely, complete, and proceeded at a steady pace, and he urged even the Coast and Geodetic Survey's most noted scientists to publish their research in a timely manner. He also insisted that all people who had borrowed government-purchased equipment from the Coast and Geodetic Survey without legal authorization return it.

Thorn championed the importance of the Coast and Geodetic Survey's inland geodetic work and how it supported, rather than duplicated, the work of the Geological Survey and was in any event an important component of the Coast and Geodetic Survey's hydrographic work along the coasts. He also advocated civilian control of the Coast and Geodetic Survey, pointing out to Cleveland and others that earlier experiments with placing it under U.S. Navy control had fared poorly. Thorn described the Coast and Geodetic Survey's essential mission as, in its simplest form, to produce "a perfect map," and to this end he and Colonna championed the need for the Survey to focus on the broad range of geodetic disciplines Colonna identified as necessary for accurate chart- and mapmaking: triangulation, astronomical observations, levelling, tidal observations, physical geodesy, topography, hydrography, and magnetic observations. To those who advocated transfer of the Coast and Geodetic Survey's work to the Navy Hydrographic Office, Thorn and Colonna replied that although the Navy could perform hydrography, it could not provide the full range of geodetic disciplines necessary for scientifically accurate surveying and mapping work.

With Thorn's emphasis on production of "a perfect map," the Coast and Geodetic Survey redoubled its cartographic efforts during his superintendency. It achieved some of the greatest precision in triangulation, and over the longest distances in history, during work related to the arc of the 39th Parallel in the western United States, as well as in secondary and tertiary triangulation work that followed around Santa Cruz and Los Angeles, California, that set new standards for precision in Coast and Geodetic Survey triangulation efforts. The Survey's astronomical observations and their relation to vertical geodesy gained worldwide respect. Tidal observations related to levelling and aspects of hydrodynamics allowed the Survey to gain greater understanding of the movement of water in tides and its effect on tidal scouring and siltation of waterways than ever before in such critical commercial areas as New York Harbor. Thorn protected and defended Charles S. Peirce's gravity research – dismissed as impractical science by Chenoweth, and the one area of the Coast and Geodetic Survey's work that even Colonna did not claim was essential to making "a perfect map" – and gravity research by the Coast and Geodetic Survey's Erasmus Darwin Preston under Thorn's superintendency allowed the Survey to expand and deepen its relationship and cooperation with the Kingdom of Hawaii's Hawaiian Government Survey.

Although Chenoweth's critique of the advance funding of the Coast and Geodetic Survey's field work necessitated restricted budgets for topographic work during Thorn's tenure, Thorn was able to manage funding such that the Survey actually managed to increase its topographic output with reduced budgets. A singular achievement of the Survey during Thorn's tenure was the promulgation of a document entitled "Instructions and Memoranda for Descriptive Reports to Accompany Original Sheets" which detailed a new requirement for Survey personnel to include in the results of their field work a narrative describing all important aspects of the landscape and seascape in the vicinity of charted areas so as to improve the usefulness and quality of the Survey's charts, United States Coast Pilot publications, and sailing instructions, a great step forward in the quality of the Survey's output.

Under Thorn, the Coast and Geodetic Survey made significant contributions to oceanography in the Gulf Stream and Gulf of Mexico, especially in the design and employment of new equipment for recording the speed and direction of ocean currents reliably at great depths. In studying magnetism, the Survey made strides in the relatively new discipline of reconstructing the configurations of magnetic declination in and around North America in previous centuries and using these reconstructions to correlate historic azimuthal bearings and correct them to true north.

All of these efforts had broader applications than just to mapmaking, but they nonetheless led to an increase in the number and quality of charts and maps. This led to Thorn and Colonna establishing a new Chart Division at Coast and Geodetic Survey headquarters in 1887. The new division brought together various chartmaking responsibilities that had been scattered throughout the agency and allowed central management of the updating and production of new maps and charts for the first time. Thorn also made changes in office procedures for producing charts that allowed more rapid production at less cost.

In 1886, the Allison Commission wrapped up its investigation and published its final report. Although it determined that all topographic responsibility outside of coastal areas would henceforth reside in the U.S. Geological Survey, it approved of the Coast and Geodetic Survey continuing its entire program of scientific research, and recommended that the Coast and Geodetic Survey remain under civilian control rather than be subordinated to the U.S. Navy. It was a victory for Thorn and Colonna. Another victory followed in 1887, when Thorn headed off a congressional attempt to subordinate the Survey to the Navy despite the Allison Commission's findings, providing Cleveland with information on the previous lack of success of such an arrangement. In a letter of January 31, 1903, which in effect was the first memoir ever written by a superintendent of the Coast and Geodetic Survey, Thorn wrote to Otto Hilgard Tittmann, then superintendent of the Coast and Geodetic Survey, "I doubt if anybody but Colonna and myself knew how close to the wind the Survey sometimes sailed, or how desperately vicious, and even villainous, were some of the agencies employed to wreck it..."

=== Conclusion of superintendency ===
Cleveland lost the 1888 presidential election, and between Election Day on November 6, 1888, and the inauguration of his successor, Benjamin Harrison, on March 4, 1889, Congress passed the Sundry Civil Bill, which included a new requirement regarding the superintendency of the Coast and Geodetic Survey. Until Cleveland appointed Thorn in 1885, the United States Secretary of the Treasury had always selected the superintendent; Cleveland's appointment of Thorn opened the door to greater congressional involvement in the selection process. In the Sundry Civil Bill, Congress stipulated that henceforth the president would select the superintendent with the consent of the U.S. Senate. Thorn had never received Senate confirmation, and support for returning to having a scientist as superintendent – considered necessary to the prestige of the Coast and Geodetic Survey – had grown over the years of his superintendency; moreover, Thorn lost presidential support for his superintendency when Cleveland left office. After Harrison took office, Thorn stayed on briefly pending the appointment and confirmation of his successor, physicist and meteorologist Thomas Corwin Mendenhall. With Mendenhall poised to replace him, Thorn resigned his post on June 30, 1889.

Thorn's tenure was a controversial one; some contemporary observers and later historians criticized him as a non-scientist who favored bureaucratic procedure over science and whose agenda favored the transfer of power over the Coast and Geodetic Survey's spending and priorities to non-scientific Department of the Treasury officials and away from the pure scientists who had made those decisions previously; Coast and Geodetic Survey scientist Charles Peirce, for one, resigned in 1886, demoralized by Thorn's focus on what Peirce considered "red tape." However, toward the end of Thorn's superintendency, the New York Times evaluated his tenure, saying in a headline "Not So Bad for Layman: Three Years’ Management of the Coast Survey; President Cleveland's Appointment of Superintendent Thorn Fully Justified by Results." The government report Centennial Celebration of the United States Coast and Geodetic Survey, published in 1916, described Thorn as "a man of sterling integrity," adding, "he had the courage to revise the report of his commission [i.e., the three-man Treasury commission investigating the Coast and Geodetic Survey which he had chaired for three weeks in July 1885 before becoming acting superintendent of the Survey] by innumerable additions and annotations, practically vindicating the men against whom charges had been made, most of which were merely technical. During the nearly four years of his administration he learned much about the methods and requirements of such a service as the Coast and Geodetic Survey of which in the beginning he had been totally ignorant...In spite of the unwholesome conditions existing in the beginning of Thorn's administration, the operations of the Survey were continued without serious interruption and much important work was accomplished."

== Later life ==
After leaving the Coast and Geodetic Survey, Thorn returned to his home in Orchard Park, New York, where he continued to operate his farm. On October 12, 1886, while still superintendent, he had applied for a patent for a potato spinner he invented, and the United States Patent Office had granted the patent on July 5, 1887. After his return to Orchard Park, he filed for a patent for an improvement of the device on November 18, 1889, and was granted a patent on the improved version on September 30, 1890.

Thorn also busied himself as a political activist and banquet speaker in Erie County, New York, and was a frequent contributor of essays to local newspapers.

== Personal life ==
Thorn married the former Eola Smith (1848–1923). They had a daughter, Gertrude (1868– ? ), and three sons, Frank Bret (1871–1944), Channing C. (1873–1928), and Ralph (1875–1949).

== Death ==
Thorn eventually was diagnosed with progressive muscular atrophy. After a lengthy illness, he died at his home in Orchard Park on April 14, 1907. He was buried at Friends Cemetery in Orchard Park.

== Commemoration ==
Thorne Bay in Alaska is named for Thorn. The name of the bay was misspelled when published in the original record, and the spelling was never corrected to match the spelling of Thorn's last name.

== Notes ==
Government offices
Preceded by Julius Erasmus Hilgard	Superintendent, United States Coast and Geodetic Survey; 1885–1889	Succeeded by Thomas Corwin Mendenhall
