= Ukiah School =

Location
- 201 Hill Street; Ukiah, (Umatilla County), Oregon 97880; United States; 45.135775°N 118.933847°W

Information
- Type: Public
- Opened: 1926
- School district: Ukiah School District
- Superintendent: James B Reger
- Teaching staff: 3.00 (FTE)
- Grades: K-12
- Enrollment: 21 (2022-2023)
- Student to teacher ratio: 7.00
- Colors: Blue and gold
- Athletics conference: OSAA 1A-8 High Desert League
- Mascot: Cougar
- Team name: Cougars
- Website: Ukiah School Homepage

Ukiah School is a public K–12 school in Ukiah, Oregon, United States. It is the sole school of the Ukiah School District 80.

== Academics ==
In 2008, 100% of the school's seniors received a high school diploma. Of 14 students, 14 graduated and none dropped out.

In 2023, 100% of the school's seniors received a high school diploma. Of 2 students, 2 graduated and none dropped out.

== Athletics ==
Ukiah School athletic teams compete in the OSAA 1A-8 High Desert League (excluding Football which competes in 1A[8]-SD3).

=== State Championships ===
- Girls cross Country: 1984

== Exchange students ==
Ukiah school has a long history of receiving exchange students from countries all over the world, including the Netherlands, Germany and China.
