= Kamela, Oregon =

Unincorporated community in the state of Oregon, United States

Coordinates: 45°26′03″N 118°23′37″W

Kamela in snow, photographed in 1910 by Lee Moorhouse

Kamela is an unincorporated community in Union County, Oregon, United States. It is located west of Interstate 84 about 20 miles northwest of La Grande.

Kamela train station in snow photographed in 1910 by Lee Moorhouse

There are several stories about how the community got its name. Among the explanations are that it was made up by combining the initials of the civil engineers working on the local railroad construction, or that it is the Cayuse word for "tree". Another informant stated that when the locale was a stagecoach station, it was called "Summit Station", but when the Union Pacific Railroad was built through the area, a different name was needed. Local doctor W. C. McKay was asked to supply a number of names of Native American origin to be used for various stations along the line. Kamela was selected from this list. According to an interpreter at the Umatilla Agency, the word meant "tamarack" in the Nez Perce language. However, L. C. McKay, the daughter of Dr. McKay, was sure the word meant "summit". Another station on the line, Mikecha, was made up of the names of three civil engineers—Mink, Kennedy, and Chalk—and the compiler of Oregon Geographic Names believed that this name was confused with Kamela. Kamela post office ran from 1887 to 1949. Kamela is the highest railroad pass in the Blue Mountains, with an elevation of 4,206 feet (1,282 m). Kamela had a roundhouse and served as a wood and timber handling point for the railroad. In 1904, the population of the community was 220. In 1940 Kamela had a population of 27. At one time the community had a school. One of the last Oregon train robberies began in Kamela in 1914.

Kamela is the highest railroad pass in the Blue Mountains, with an elevation of 4,206 feet (1,282 m). Kamela had a roundhouse and served as a wood and timber handling point for the railroad. In 1904, the population of the community was 220. In 1940 Kamela had a population of 27. At one time the community had a school. One of the last Oregon train robberies began in Kamela in 1914.
