= Ukiah, Oregon =

- City
- Location in Oregon
- Coordinates: 45°08′04″N 118°55′59″W
- Country: United States
- State: Oregon
- County: Umatilla
- Incorporated: 1969

Area
  - Total: 0.24 sq mi (0.62 km^{2})
  - Land: 0.24 sq mi (0.62 km^{2})
  - Water: 0 sq mi (0.00 km^{2})
- Elevation: 3,356 ft (1,023 m)

Population (2020)
  - Total: 159
  - Density: 667.4/sq mi (257.67/km^{2})
- Time zone: UTC-8 (Pacific)
  - Summer (DST): UTC-7 (Pacific)
- ZIP code: 97880
- Area code: 541
- FIPS code: 41-75550
- GNIS feature ID: 2412126
- Website: www.cityofukiahoregon.com

Ukiah (/juːkaɪʌ/) is a city in Umatilla County, Oregon, United States. As of the 2020 census, Ukiah had a population of 159. It is part of the Hermiston-Pendleton Micropolitan Statistical Area. It was named by an early settler after the town of Ukiah, California.

Ukiah is tied with Seneca, in Grant County, for the coldest official temperature in Oregon. Ukiah dropped to −54 °F (−48 °C) on February 9, 1933, during a major cold snap across Siberia and North America. On February 10, Seneca also hit −54 °F, so the National Weather Service gives Seneca the record because it had the most recent occurrence of that temperature.

== History ==
The Camas Land Company platted Ukiah in August 1890. E. B. Gambee, who moved from Ukiah, California, to Oregon in 1881, suggested the name. DeWitt C. Whiting was the first postmaster in Ukiah, where a post office opened in September 1890.

== Geography ==
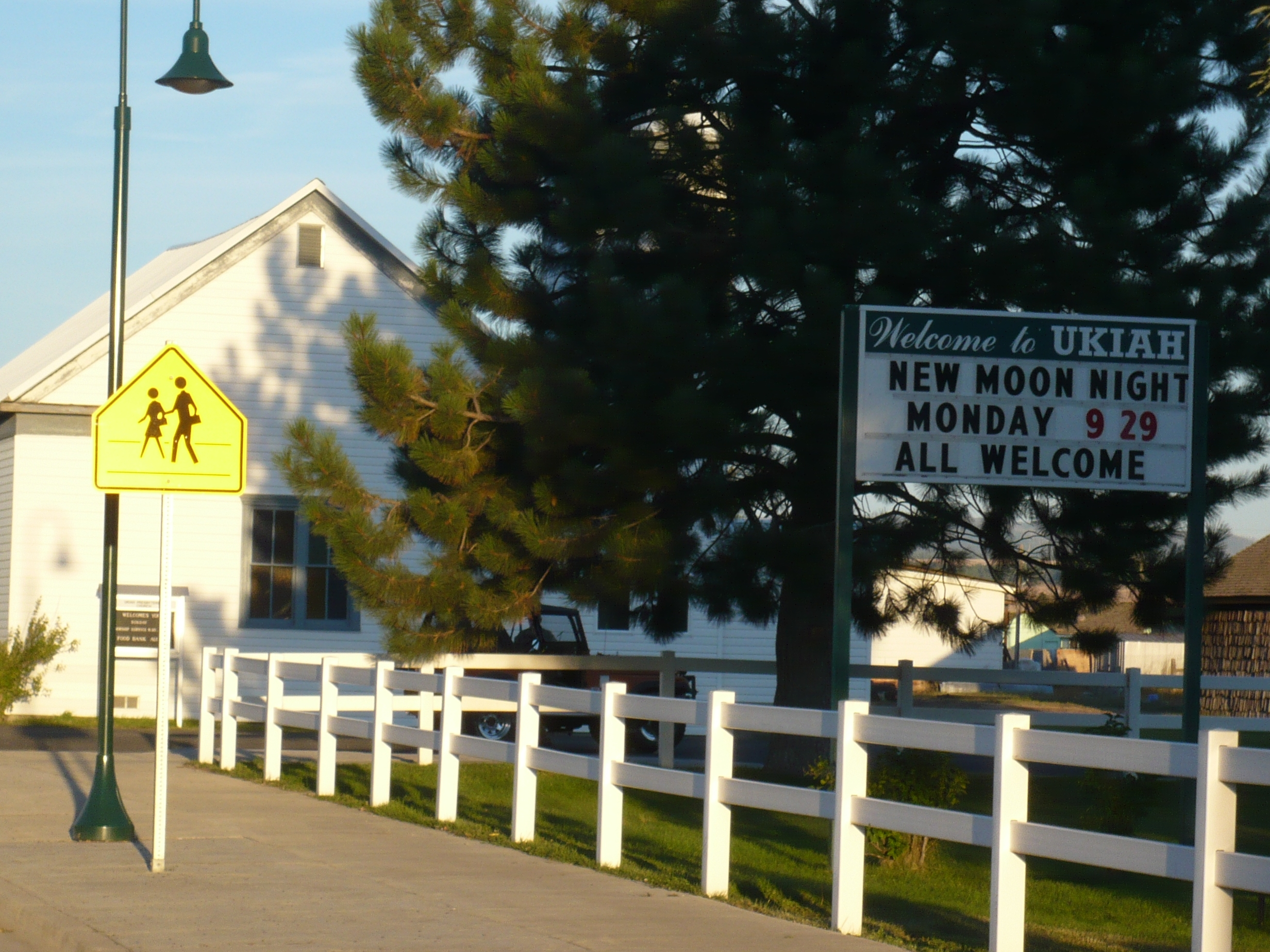
"Welcome to Ukiah" sign

Ukiah is in northeastern Oregon at the intersection of U.S. Route 395 and Oregon Route 244. The city is about 45 miles (72 km) south of Pendleton by highway and about 50 miles (80 km) southwest of La Grande. It lies along Camas Creek, which flows west from the Blue Mountains and through the Umatilla National Forest east of the city. Camas Creek is a tributary of the North Fork John Day River.

According to the United States Census Bureau, the city has a total area of 0.24 square miles (0.62 km^{2}), all of it land.

== Demographics ==
Historical population
Census	Pop.	Note	%±
1980	249		—
1990	250		0.4%
2000	255		2.0%
2010	186		−27.1%
2020	159		−14.5%
U.S. Decennial Census

=== 2020 census ===
As of the 2020 census, Ukiah had a population of 159. The median age was 43.8 years; 20.1% of residents were under the age of 18 and 23.9% were 65 years of age or older. For every 100 females there were 93.9 males, and for every 100 females age 18 and over there were 95.4 males age 18 and over.

0% of residents lived in urban areas, while 100.0% lived in rural areas.

There were 78 households in Ukiah, of which 37.2% had children under the age of 18 living in them. Of all households, 37.2% were married-couple households, 26.9% were households with a male householder and no spouse or partner present, and 23.1% were households with a female householder and no spouse or partner present. About 23.1% of all households were made up of individuals and 14.1% had someone living alone who was 65 years of age or older.

There were 106 housing units, of which 26.4% were vacant. Among occupied housing units, 53.8% were owner-occupied and 46.2% were renter-occupied. The homeowner vacancy rate was 10.6% and the rental vacancy rate was <0.1%.

Racial composition as of the 2020 census
Race	Number	Percent
White	151	95.0%
Black or African American	1	0.6%
American Indian and Alaska Native	2	1.3%
Asian	0	0%
Native Hawaiian and Other Pacific Islander	0	0%
Some other race	1	0.6%
Two or more races	4	2.5%
Hispanic or Latino (of any race)	4	2.5%

=== 2010 census ===
As of the census of 2010, there were 186 people, 79 households, and 48 families residing in the city. The population density was 775.0 inhabitants per square mile (299.2/km^{2}). There were 122 housing units at an average density of 508.3 per square mile (196.3/km^{2}). The racial makeup of the city was 90.3% White, 2.2% Native American, 3.2% Asian, 2.7% from other races, and 1.6% from two or more races. Hispanic or Latino of any race were 4.3% of the population.

There were 79 households, of which 25.3% had children under the age of 18 living with them, 46.8% were married couples living together, 7.6% had a female householder with no husband present, 6.3% had a male householder with no wife present, and 39.2% were non-families. 32.9% of all households were made up of individuals, and 10.2% had someone living alone who was 65 years of age or older. The average household size was 2.11 and the average family size was 2.58.

The median age in the city was 45 years. 28% of residents were under the age of 18; 8% were between the ages of 18 and 24; 14% were from 25 to 44; 29% were from 45 to 64; and 21% were 65 years of age or older. The gender makeup of the city was 53.2% male and 46.8% female.

=== 2000 census ===
As of the census of 2000, there were 255 people, 96 households, and 69 families residing in the city. The population density was 1,201.0 inhabitants per square mile (463.7/km^{2}). There were 124 housing units at an average density of 584.0 per square mile (225.5/km^{2}). The racial makeup of the city was 95.29% White, 2.75% Asian, 1.18% from other races, and 0.78% from two or more races. Hispanic or Latino of any race were 1.57% of the population.

There were 96 households, out of which 33.3% had children under the age of 18 living with them, 60.4% were married couples living together, 5.2% had a female householder with no husband present, and 27.1% were non-families. 19.8% of all households were made up of individuals, and 6.3% had someone living alone who was 65 years of age or older. The average household size was 2.52 and the average family size was 2.79.

In the city, the population was spread out, with 26.3% under the age of 18, 7.5% from 18 to 24, 27.5% from 25 to 44, 25.5% from 45 to 64, and 13.3% who were 65 years of age or older. The median age was 40 years. For every 100 females, there were 104.0 males. For every 100 females age 18 and over, there were 108.9 males.

The median income for a household in the city was $34,773, and the median income for a family was $35,313. Males had a median income of $31,250 versus $25,625 for females. The per capita income for the city was $13,945. About 10.7% of families and 18.5% of the population were below the poverty line, including 12.0% of those under the age of 18 and 16.0% of those 65 or over.

== Education ==
Ukiah School (K-12) is the sole school in Ukiah. It is in the Ukiah School District 80.

In 1969 the high school in Ukiah had 24 students, making it, along with the high school component of Jewell School, the high school in the state with the lowest enrollment.

== Climate ==
This region experiences warm (but not hot) and dry summers, with no average monthly temperatures above 62 °F (17 °C). According to the Köppen climate classification system, Ukiah has a dry-summer humid continental climate, abbreviated "Dsb" on climate maps.

Climate data for Ukiah
Month	Jan	Feb	Mar	Apr	May	Jun	Jul	Aug	Sep	Oct	Nov	Dec	Year
Record high °F (°C)	60 (16)	70 (21)	75 (24)	87 (31)	93 (34)	100 (38)	106 (41)	110 (43)	104 (40)	92 (33)	76 (24)	68 (20)	110 (43)
Mean daily maximum °F (°C)	35.6 (2.0)	42.1 (5.6)	49 (9)	57.2 (14.0)	64.4 (18.0)	72.5 (22.5)	83.2 (28.4)	82.4 (28.0)	74.2 (23.4)	63.2 (17.3)	46.8 (8.2)	37.9 (3.3)	59 (15)
Mean daily minimum °F (°C)	13.9 (−10.1)	18.8 (−7.3)	23.5 (−4.7)	28.2 (−2.1)	33.2 (0.7)	37.9 (3.3)	39.7 (4.3)	37.9 (3.3)	32.3 (0.2)	27.2 (−2.7)	23 (−5)	17.5 (−8.1)	27.7 (−2.4)
Record low °F (°C)	−46 (−43)	−54 (−48)	−17 (−27)	9 (−13)	12 (−11)	17 (−8)	21 (−6)	20 (−7)	8 (−13)	−2 (−19)	−32 (−36)	−38 (−39)	−54 (−48)
Average precipitation inches (mm)	1.92 (49)	1.5 (38)	1.43 (36)	1.41 (36)	1.73 (44)	1.67 (42)	0.54 (14)	0.67 (17)	0.84 (21)	1.34 (34)	1.92 (49)	2.14 (54)	17.1 (430)
Average snowfall inches (cm)	11.4 (29)	7.3 (19)	4.2 (11)	1.2 (3.0)	0.1 (0.25)	0 (0)	0 (0)	0 (0)	0.1 (0.25)	0.3 (0.76)	4.8 (12)	8.8 (22)	38.4 (98)
Average precipitation days	12	10	11	10	9	8	3	4	5	7	11	12	102
