= Oregon Route 244 =

State highway in northern Oregon, US

Oregon Route 244
- Route 244 highlighted in red

Route information
- Maintained by ODOT
- Length: 47.22 mi (75.99 km)

Major junctions
- West end: US 395 near Ukiah
- East end: I-84 / US 30 in Hilgard

Location
- Country: United States
- State: Oregon
- Counties: Umatilla, Union

Highway system
- Oregon Highways; Interstate; US; State; Named; Scenic
← OR 242	→ OR 245

Oregon Route 244 (OR 244) is an Oregon state highway running from Ukiah in Umatilla County to Hilgard in Union County. OR 244 is known as the Ukiah-Hilgard Highway No. 341 (see Oregon highways and routes). It is 47.22 miles (75.99 km) long and runs east–west.

== Route description ==
OR 244 begins at an intersection with U.S. Route 395 1 mile (1.6 km) west of Ukiah and continues east and northeast to Hilgard, where it ends at an intersection with Interstate 84.

== History ==
This is the 2nd Oregon Route to use the number 244. The first OR 244 was located in suburban Portland, connecting U.S. 99W near Tualatin with OR 43 in West Linn. That route later became part of an extended Oregon Route 212 but was deleted from the state highway system after Interstate 205 was completed.

== Major intersections ==
Milepoints are as reported by ODOT and do not necessarily reflect current mileage. Z indicates overlapping mileage due to construction longer than established route, and – indicates negative mileage behind established beginning point. Segments that are locally maintained may be omitted. For routes traversing multiple named state highways, each milepoint is preceded by the corresponding state highway number.

County	Location	Milepoint	Destinations	Notes
Umatilla	Ukiah	0.00	US 395 – Long Creek, John Day, Pendleton	Western terminus
Union	Hilgard	47.22	I-84 / US 30 – La Grande, Pendleton	Eastern terminus
1.000 mi = 1.609 km; 1.000 km = 0.621 mi
