= Theodore Erasmus Hilgard =

German lawyer, viticulturalist and Latin farmer

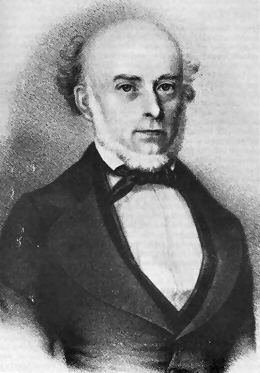
Theodor hilgard.jpg

Theodore Erasmus Hilgard (7 July 1790, Marnheim – 14 February 1873, Heidelberg) was a lawyer, viticulturalist and Latin farmer.

== Europe ==
He grew up during the Napoleonic Wars in a family very sympathetic to the principles of the French Revolution. He studied at the Universities of Heidelberg (1807), Göttingen (1808-9) and Paris (1810), and took a legal course in Coblenz (1811). During the time of the French rule, he practiced law in Trèves, and, on the restoration of the Rhine Province to Germany, settled in Zweibrücken, where he held the appointment of associate justice of the court of appeals from 1821 till 1835. He was also a member of the provincial assembly from 1821 till 1826. He resigned as justice because of reactionary and bureaucratic policies instituted by the Bavarian government in the administration of justice in the Palatinate. In 1816, he married Margarethe Pauli.

== United States ==
In 1835 he came to the United States and settled in St. Clair County, Illinois. He purchased a farm near Belleville and, in addition to managing it, focused on viticulture, becoming the first to introduce it in Illinois. At first, he tried to determine which of the Rhenish or French vines were best adapted to the climate, but he soon found the indigenous Catawba grape most suitable and produced a wine that acquired a high local reputation.

The town of West Belleville, which gradually surrounded his original homestead, was laid out on his property and under his direction. He profitably sold a large part of his land as house lots. Meanwhile, he gave special attention to the education of his children, whom he instructed personally in mathematics, languages, and philosophy.

== Return to Germany ==
In 1851 he returned to Germany, having been invited by the Bavarian government to take part in recasting the law of mortgages of that country into a more modern form. Subsequently, he came back to the United States, but, finding his family dispersed, in 1854 he again returned to Germany with his new wife Maria Theveny. He passed the remainder of his life quietly in Heidelberg.

== Works ==
While on his farm in the United States he revived an early taste for poetry, and devoted a portion of his leisure to making translations of ancient and modern poems into German, some of which were published and received with high commendation, notably Ovid's Metamorphoses and "The Fire-Worshipers" from Thomas Moore's Lalla Rookh. Besides numerous legal and historical articles and minor poems contributed to American and European periodicals, he published:

- Twelve Paragraphs on Pauperism (Heidelberg, 1847)
- Ten Paragraphs on Constitutional Monarchy, and Republics (1849)
- My Recollections, an autobiography (1858)
- The Hundred Days, an Epic Poem (1859)

== Family ==
Several of his children went on to noted careers:

- Julius Erasmus Hilgard (January 7, 1825 – May 9, 1890) was an engineer.
- Theodore Charles Hilgard (February 28, 1828 - March 5, 1875) was a physician.
- Eugene Woldemar Hilgard (January 5, 1833 – January 8, 1916) was an expert on soils.

He was a granduncle of United States journalist and financier Henry Villard.
