= Columbia Gorge Discovery Center & Museum =

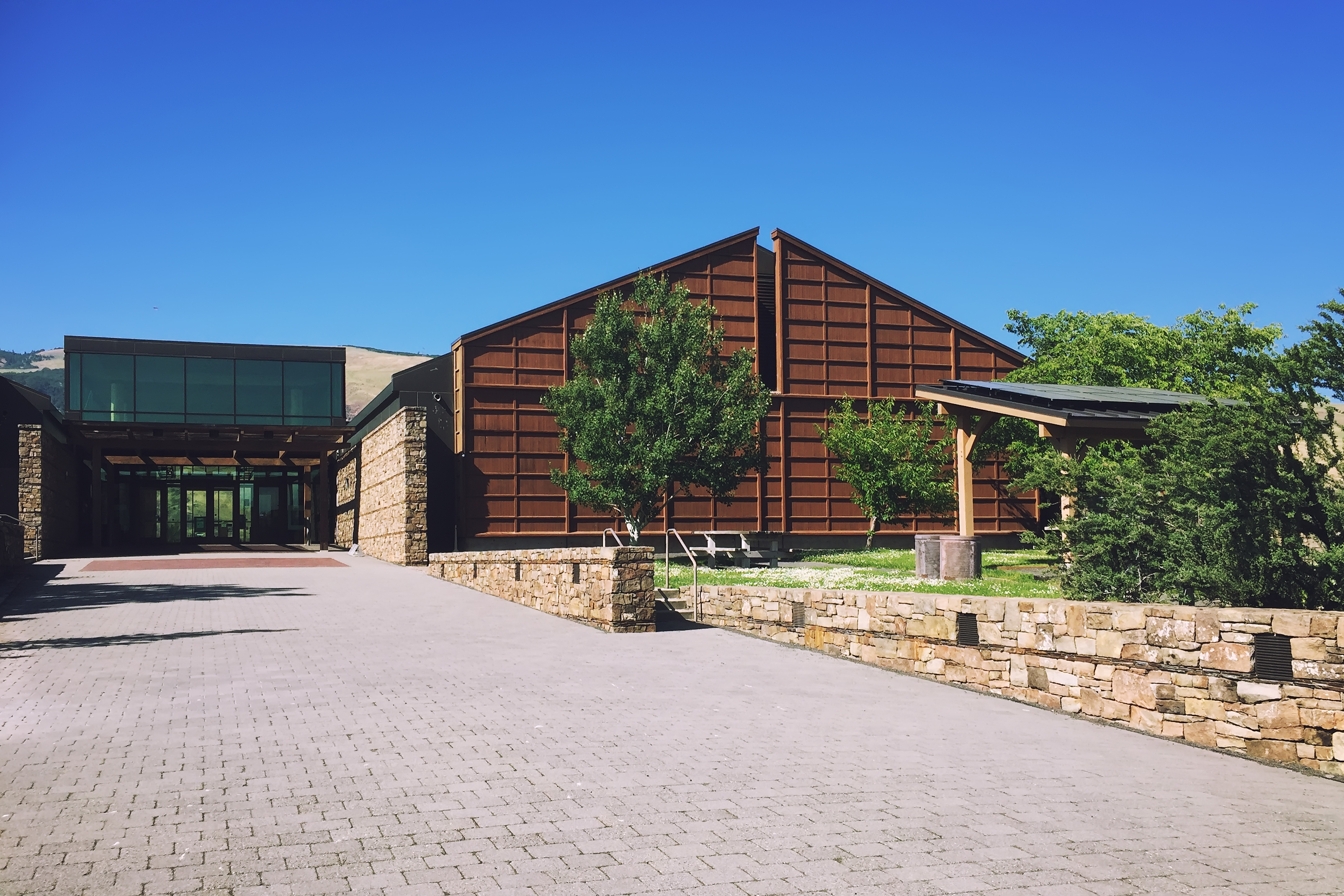
- Established: 1997
- Location: 5000 Discovery Drive; The Dalles, Oregon
- Coordinates: 45.6547°N 121.2105°W
- Website: www.gorgediscovery.org

The Columbia Gorge Discovery Center & Museum is the official interpretive center and history museum of the Columbia River Gorge, located on 54 acres (22 ha) in The Dalles, Oregon. Opened in 1997, the 48,200-square-foot (4,480 m^{2}) center features exhibits about the area's geology, Ice Age prehistory, Native American culture and basketry, exploration by Lewis and Clark and others on the Oregon Trail, settlement, transportation and natural history. The Wasco County Historical Museum is a 17,200 square-foot exhibit wing which tells the history of the people of Wasco County, Oregon.

The center also offers live raptor programs, a research library, meeting rooms, auditorium, gift shop and cafe. The site includes a wheelchair-accessible paved interpretive trail with vistas of the Columbia River Gorge and the Klickitat Hills.

== See also ==
- National Historic Trails Interpretive Center
- National Historic Oregon Trail Interpretive Center
