= Viento State Park =

State park in Oregon, United States

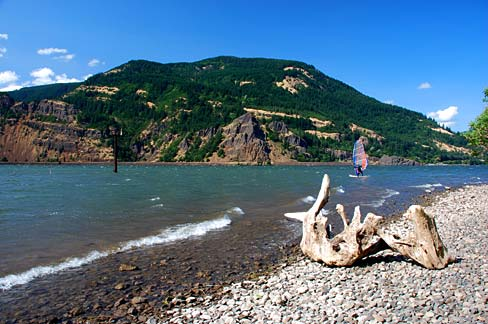
- A windsurfer on the Columbia River at Viento State Park.

- Location within Oregon Location within the United States
- Type: Public, state, camping
- Location: Hood River County, Oregon
- Nearest city: Hood River
- Coordinates: 45°41′38″N 121°40′04″W
- Operator: Oregon Parks and Recreation Department

Viento State Park is a state park in north central Hood River County, Oregon, near the city of Hood River. The park, named for the former Viento railroad station located there, is administered by the Oregon Parks and Recreation Department. The park is on the south bank of the Columbia River in the Columbia River Gorge. Interstate 84 and the Union Pacific Railroad pass through the park. It offers a seasonal, full-service campground, access to gorge hiking trails beyond park boundaries, a day-use area and river access for windsurfing and kiteboarding.

The park is in the Columbia River Gorge National Scenic Area. The name Viento was constructed using letters from the names of Henry Villard of the Northern Pacific Railroad; William Endicott, a Boston banker; and a contractor named Tolman.

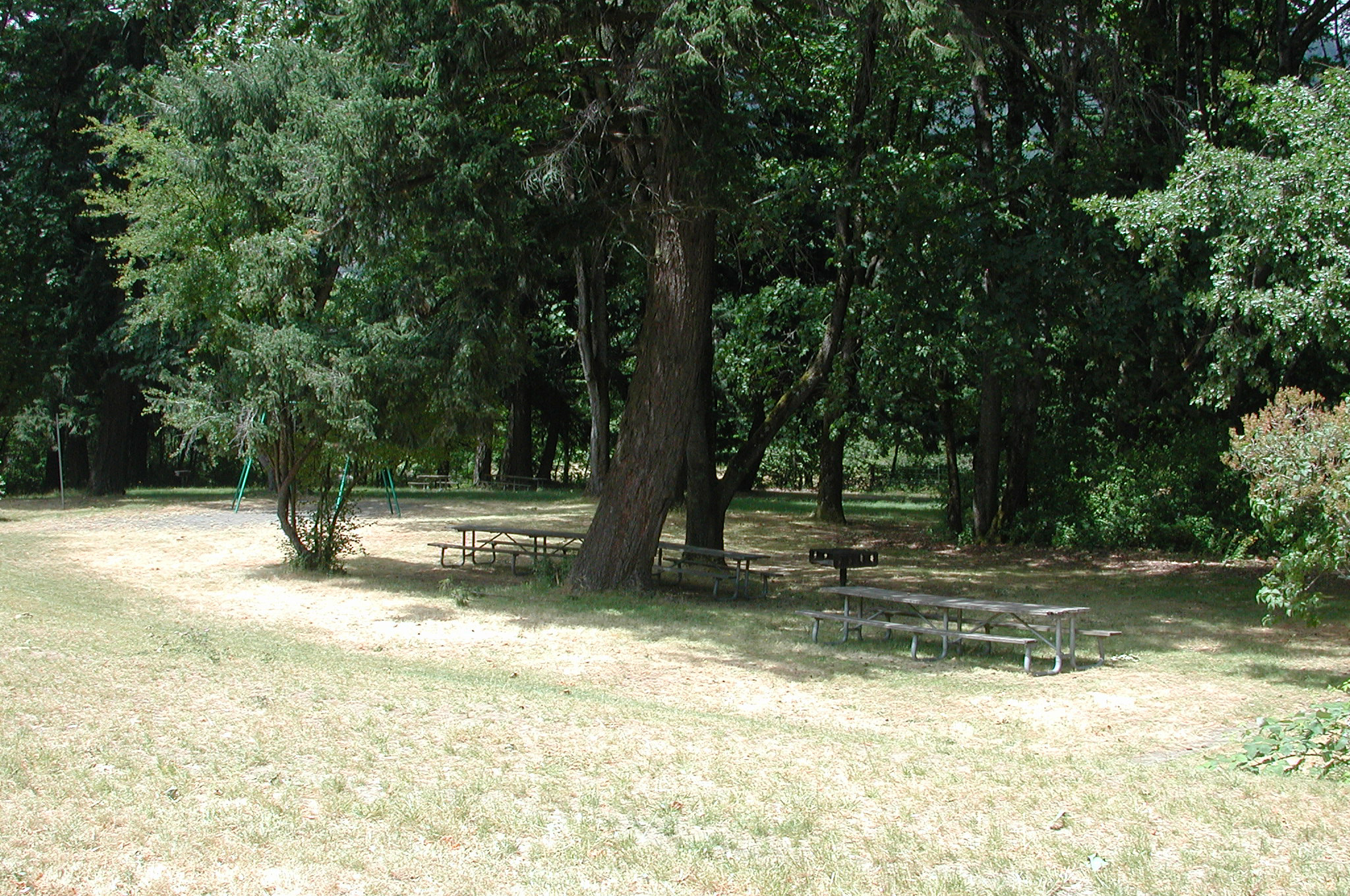
Picnic area near Interstate 84

== See also ==
- List of Oregon State Parks
- Starvation Creek State Park
- Historic Columbia River Highway
