= Herman Creek =

- Location of the mouth of Herman Creek in Oregon

Location
- Country: United States
- State: Oregon
- County: Hood River County

Physical characteristics
- Source
  - location: Hicks Lake near Chinidere Mountain
  - coordinates: 45°36′31″N 121°49′06″W
  - elevation: 3,882 feet (1,183 m)
- 2nd source
  - location: Mud Lake near Tomlike Mountain
  - coordinates: 45°35′55″N 121°47′21″W
  - elevation: 3,668 feet (1,118 m)
- Mouth: Columbia River at Cascade Locks
  - location: Oregon
  - coordinates: 45°40′56″N 121°51′40″W
  - elevation: 82 feet (25 m)

Basin features
- Progression: Herman Creek → Columbia River → Pacific Ocean

Herman Creek is a creek located in Multnomah County, Oregon, in the Columbia River Gorge. A tributary of the Columbia River, the creek flows for approximately 8 miles (13 km) from Hicks Lake to its mouth on the eastern edge of Cascade Locks. The East Fork Herman Creek is a major tributary that begins at Mud Lake and joins the main stem approximately halfway between Hicks Lake and the Columbia River, separated by Woolly Horn Ridge and Tomlike Mountain. The watershed is bounded by the Benson Plateau to the west, Nick Eaton Ridge and Green Point Mountain to the east, and Chinidere Mountain and Waucoma Ridge to the south.

The creek and the surrounding areas are located in the Mt. Hood National Forest and comprise a popular recreation destination. The Herman Creek Trail #406 runs for 10.5 miles along the East Fork from an Interstate 84 frontage road to a junction with the Pacific Crest Trail near Chinidere Mountain. Multiple other trails are also present on the surrounding ridges and mountains, providing connections to the rest of the Gorge's trail network.
