= Julius Erasmus Hilgard =

German-American engineer (1825 – 1891)

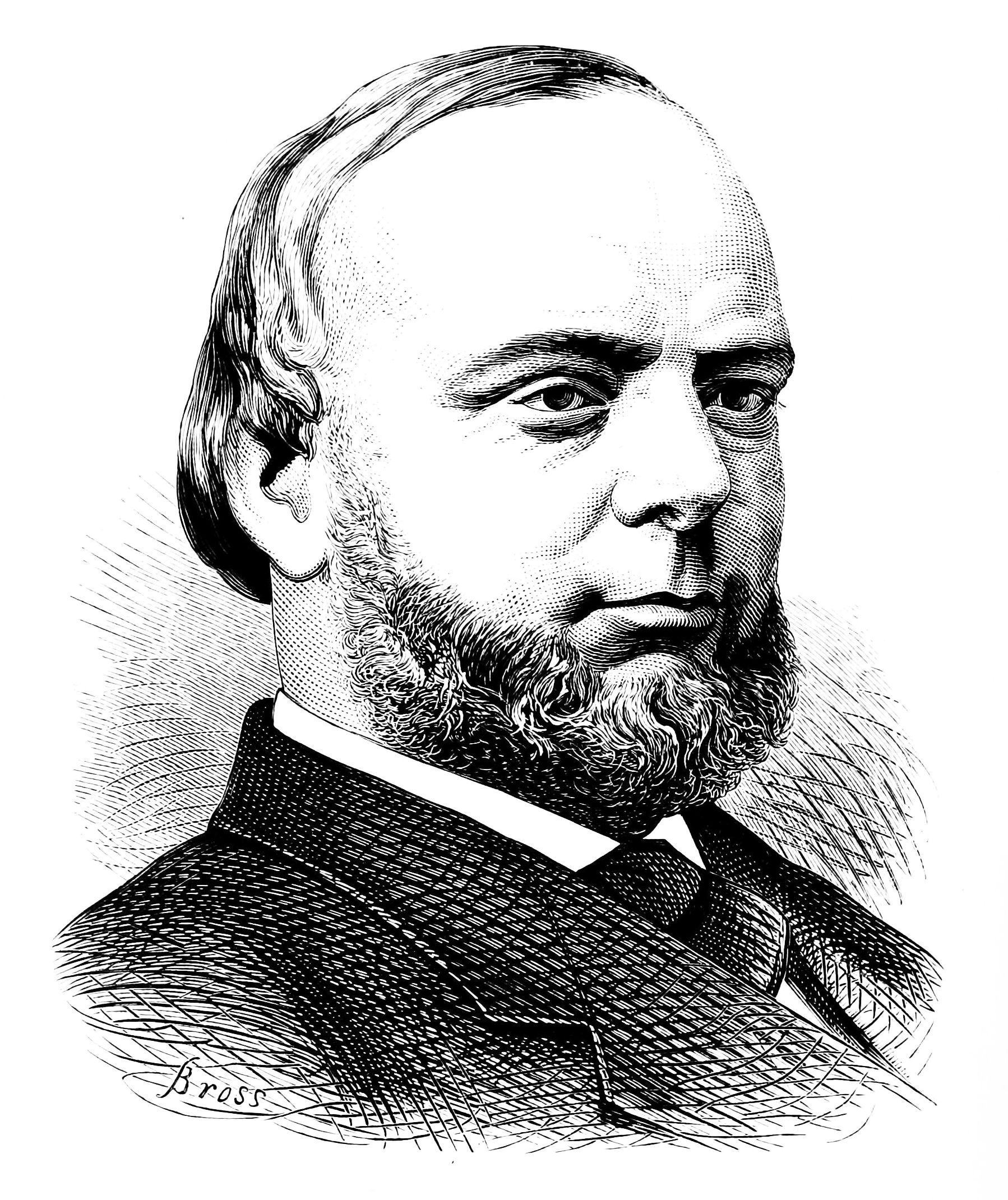
- Born: January 7, 1825; Zweibrücken, Kingdom of Bavaria
- Died: May 8, 1891 (aged 66); Washington, D.C.
- Occupation: Engineer

Julius Erasmus Hilgard (January 7, 1825 – May 8, 1891) was a Bavarian-American engineer.

== Biography ==
Julius Erasmus Hilgard was born at Zweibrücken, Rhineland-Palatinate, Kingdom of Bavaria on January 7, 1825. His father, Theodore Erasmus Hilgard, was for many years Chief Justice of the Court of Appeals, but on account of his liberal opinions was so dissatisfied with conditions in his native country that in 1835 he emigrated to America. The journey from his native place to Havre was made in wagons. After a voyage of 62 days, the family landed at New Orleans at Christmas, and journeyed up the Mississippi to St. Louis, and thence to a farm at Belleville, Illinois. As the oldest son, Julius gave valuable help by his practical talents. His education was carried on at home. Music, chemistry, ancient and modern languages and mathematics (the higher branches of the latter being studied without outside help), occupied his attention until 1843, when he went to Philadelphia to study engineering and to obtain employment. In that city he made the acquaintance of Professor Bache, and commenced a lifelong friendship with Elisha Kent Kane, the arctic explorer.

The first work obtained was in the preliminary surveys of the Bear Mountain Railroad. Soon, however, Professor Bache, recognizing his abilities, procured young Hilgard a position in the United States Coast Survey, in which service he continued, with short interruptions, until his death. In the field work, in computations and investigations in the office, in the publication of the records and results of the Survey, in his influence on political leaders, Mr. Hilgard rendered highly intelligent and valuable aid to the service. Throughout the American Civil War he served the Union Army and United States Navy by the construction of maps and charts and by surveys as well as by tidal and other information. During the failing health of Professor Bache, Hilgard, who was at that time the in charge of the U.S. Coast Survey office, was obliged to perform the duties of superintendent, which he did without extra compensation until the appointment of Benjamin Peirce to the position. Though it seems fitting that Hilgard should have become superintendent upon the death of Bache, he did not receive the appointment until 1881, by which time the agency had been renamed the United States Coast and Geodetic Survey. At that time his health was so impaired that, as he said, "it came too late." He was soon forced to resign. While assistant superintendent, his work in the Office of Weights and Measures gained him most favorable notice in Europe and he was invited to the directorship of an International Bureau of Weights and Measures about to be established in Paris. Declining this, but continuing his connection with the International Committee, a beautiful Sèvres vase was presented to him by President Theirs on behalf of the French Government in recognition of his services. He also had great satisfaction in being instrumental in bringing to a successful ending the operations for the telegraphic determination of transatlantic longitudes.

In 1863, Hilgard was elected as a member of the American Philosophical Society.

In 1872 he was one of the members of the International Metric Commission at Paris and was made a member of the permanent committee. In 1875, he was president of the American Association for the Advancement of Science. Among his other valuable services, Hilgard delivered in 1876 a course of twenty lectures at Johns Hopkins University on the subject of "Extended Territorial Surveying."

Resigning his position as superintendent of the U.S. Coast and Geodetic Survey in July 1885, he lived in retirement, and died at Washington, D.C., on May 8, 1891.

== Projects ==
One of the projects on which J.E. Hilgard worked, on behalf of the Smithsonian Institution and the U.S. Coast Survey, was the construction of a self-recording magnetometer of United States manufacture based on the design of Charles Brooke, and described in an 1860 report to the Smithsonian Institution. The significance of self-recording magnetometers, as they relate to geomagnetic storms was not fully understood until the late twentieth century and is not referenced in any of the nineteenth-century biographies of Hilgard. In 1859, the self-recording magnetometer at the Smithsonian Institution may have been only the second such device in operation, the original one being under the management of Balfour Stewart at the Kew Observatory in London. Unlike the instruments at the Kew Observatory, it is unlikely that the instruments at the Smithsonian were in continuous operation during any part of 1859. Alexander Dallas Bache was the superintendent of the U.S. Coast Survey at the time and sponsored many studies pertaining to terrestrial magnetism. Records show that Bache was in regular correspondence with the Royal Society and even coordinated magnetic surveys of North America with them.

== Sources ==
Government offices
Preceded by Carlile Pollock Patterson	Superintendent, United States Coast and Geodetic Survey; 1881–1885	Succeeded by Frank Manly Thorn
