= Emigrant Springs State Heritage Area =

State park in Oregon, United States

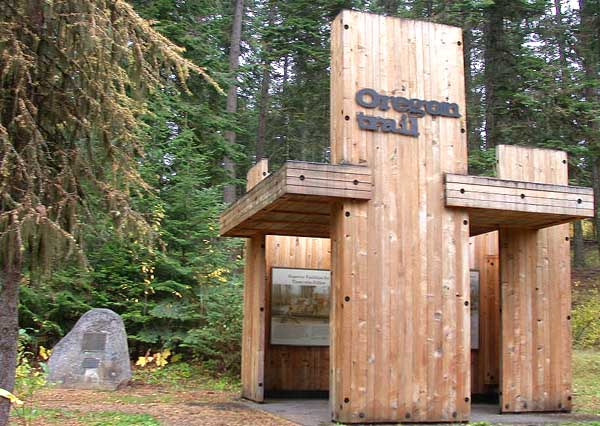
- Emigrant Springs State Heritage Area, showing Harding marker and interpretative center

- Location within Oregon Location within the United States
- Type: State park
- Location: Umatilla County, Oregon
- Nearest city: Pendelton
- Coordinates: 45°32′32″N 118°27′46″W
- Website: Official website

Emigrant Springs State Heritage Area is a state park located in central Umatilla County, Oregon, United States, approximately 15 mi (24 km) southeast of Pendleton. Located in old-growth forest near the summit of the Blue Mountains along Interstate 84, the park was the location of a well-used campsite by emigrants along the Oregon Trail in the middle 19th century.

The park is open year-round and provides a modern campground with hook-ups. The park also has cabins available for rent. During the summer months the park features historical recreations of trail life in the 1850s. The park also contains an Oregon Trail interpretative center. The center is next to a marker commemorating the visit by President Warren G. Harding in 1923, who had come to Eastern Oregon to commemorate the Oregon Trail.
