= Starvation Creek State Park =

State park in Oregon, United States

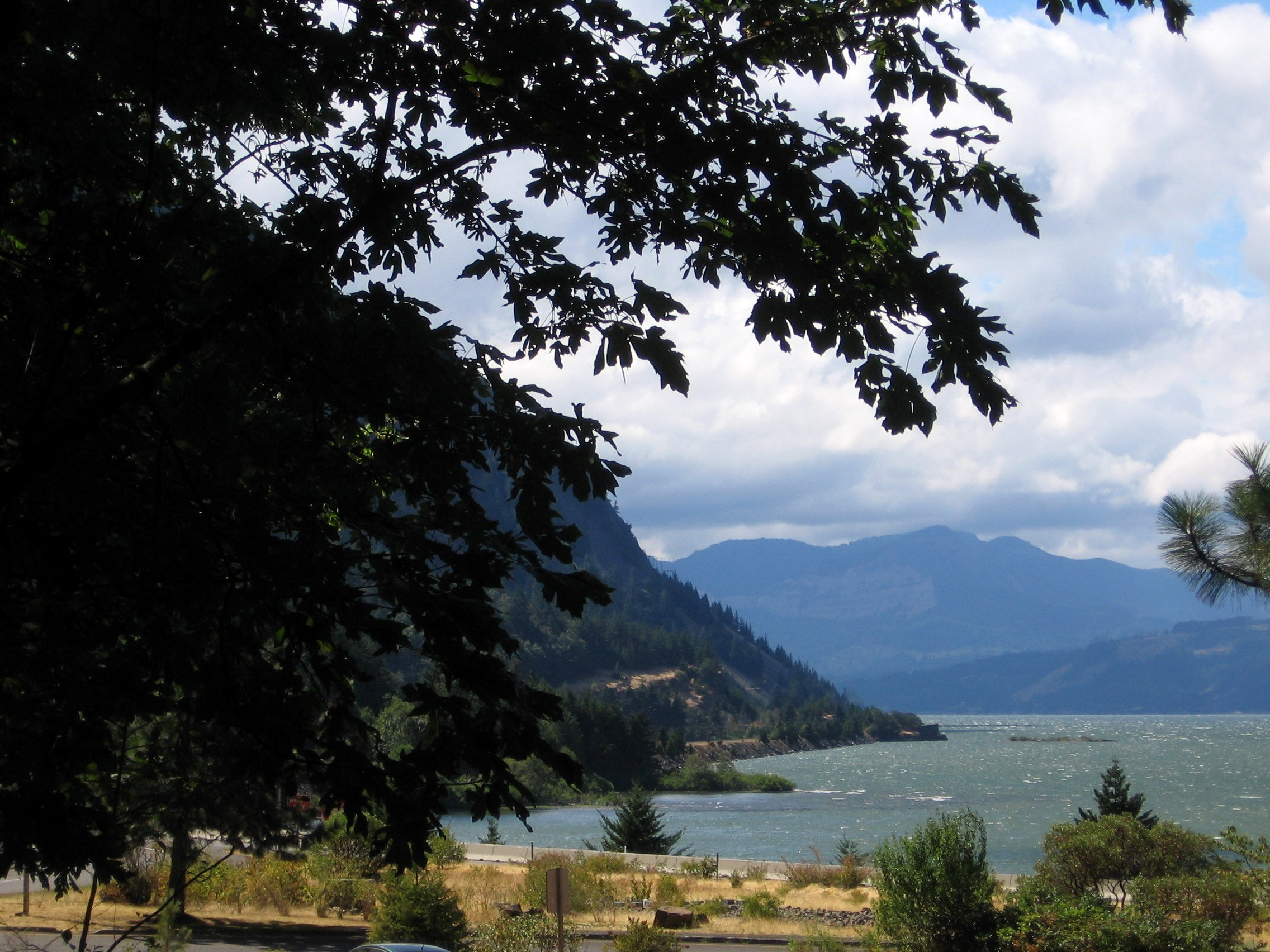

- Location within Oregon Location within the United States
- Type: Public, state
- Location: Hood River County, Oregon
- Nearest city: Hood River
- Coordinates: 45°41′17″N 121°41′21″W
- Operator: Oregon Parks and Recreation Department

Starvation Creek State Park is a state park located west of Hood River, Oregon in the Columbia River Gorge. It was named Starvation Creek because a train was stopped there by snow drifts and passengers had to dig out the train. No documented starvation took place.

Starvation Creek has a small waterfall and a trailhead for hiking.

== Images ==
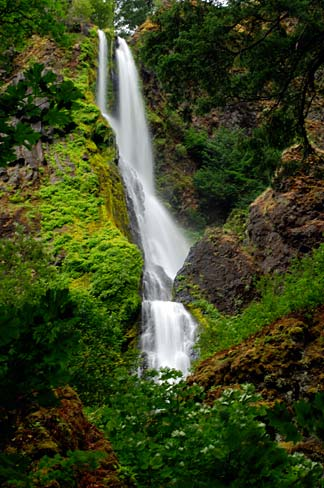
Starvation Creek Waterfall

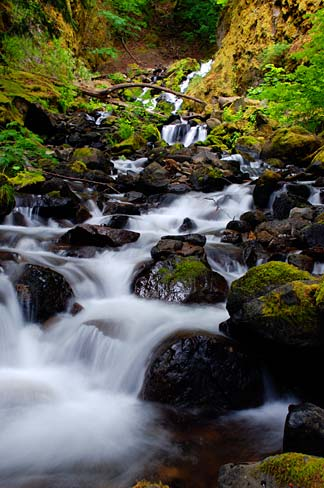
Starvation Creek Cascade

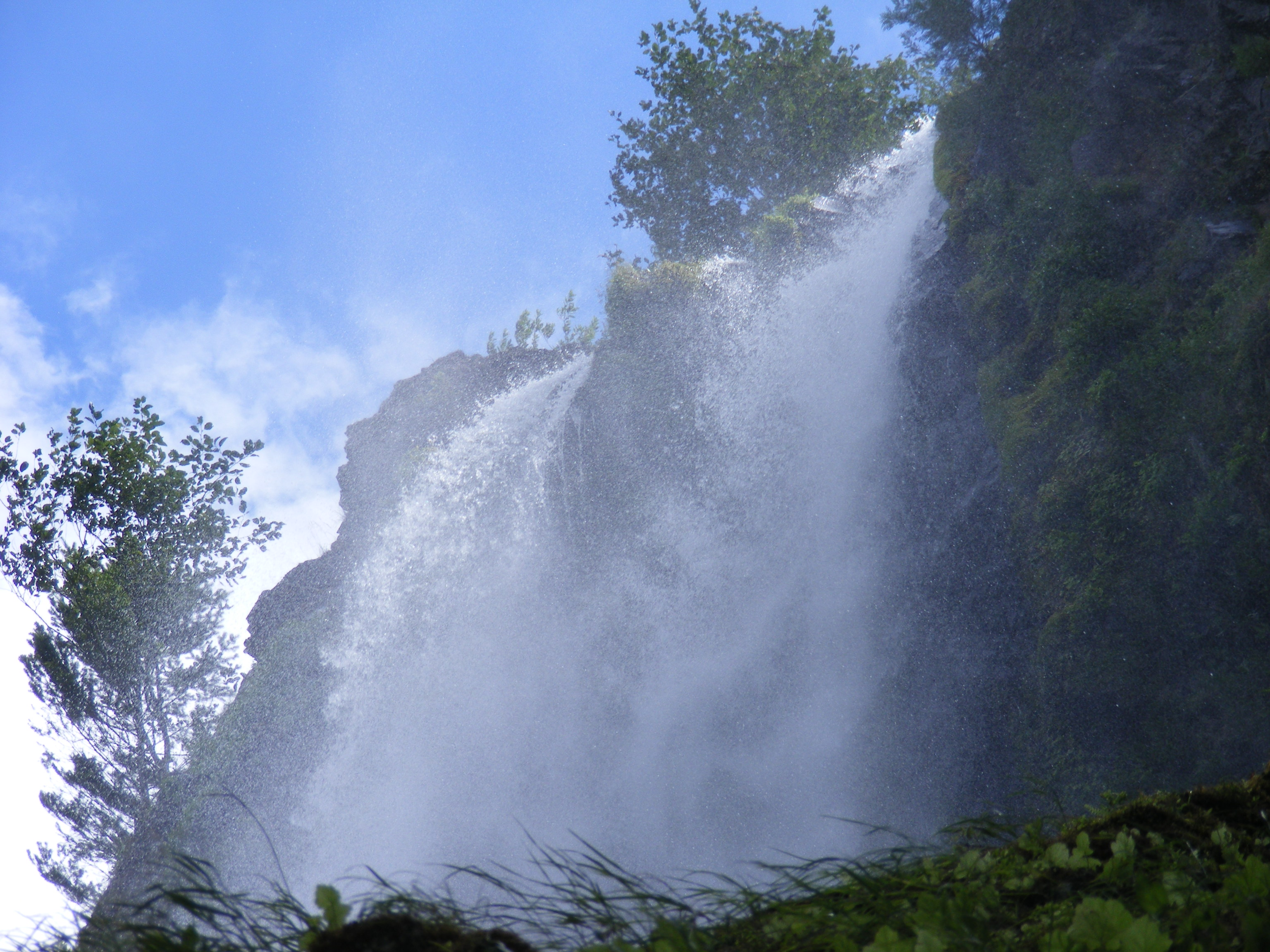
Upper Starvation Creek Falls

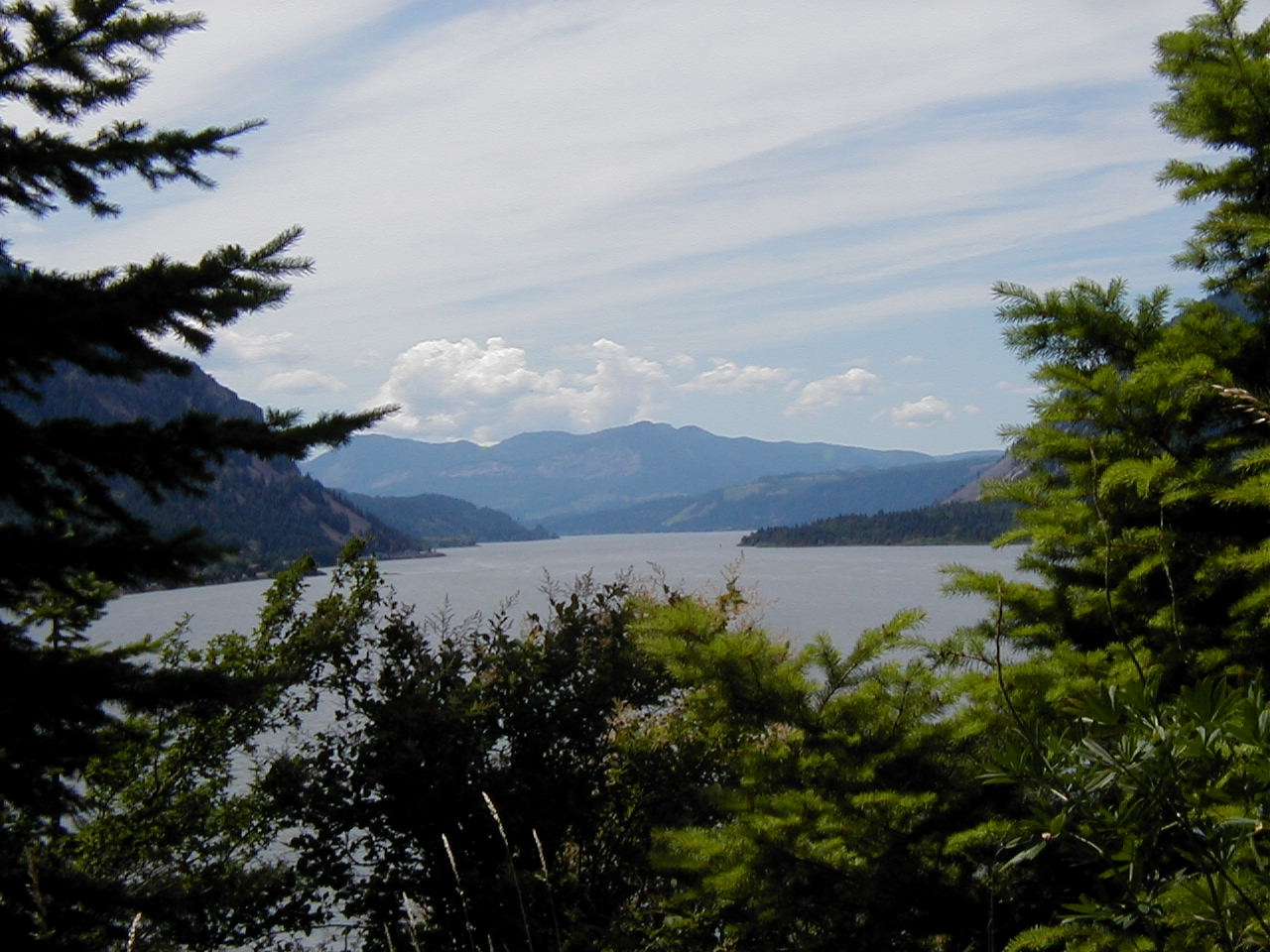
Mosier, Oregon near Starvation Creek, in the Columbia River Gorge
