= Roe–Parker House =

Historic house in Oregon, United States

- Formerly listed on the U.S. National Register of Historic Places
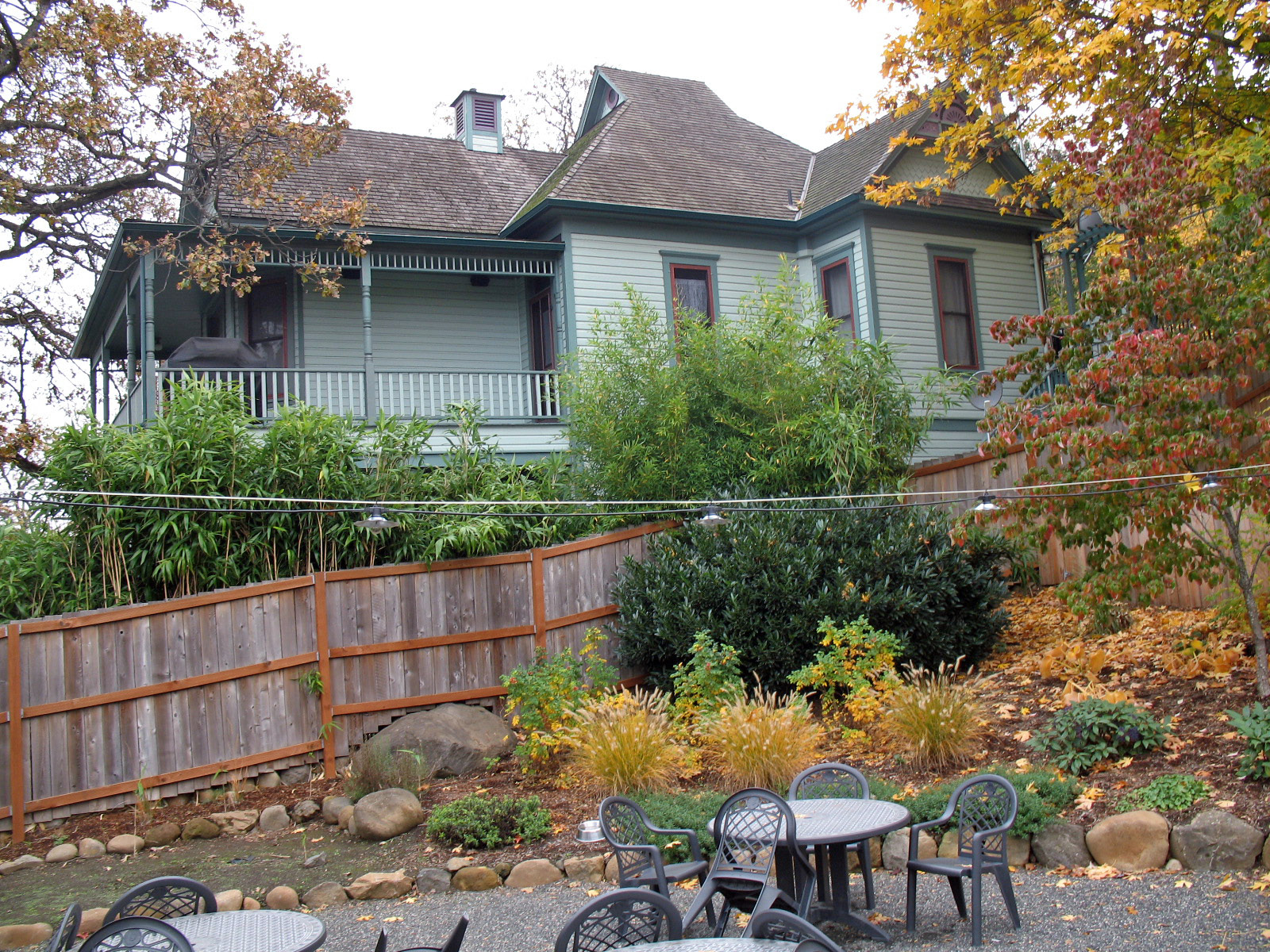
- The Roe–Parker House in 2009

- Location within Oregon
- Location: 110 Sherman Avenue (Note: The house's original address prior to its 2002 relocation was 416 State Street, coordinates 45°42′30″N 121°30′55″W.); Hood River, Oregon
- Coordinates: 45°42′28″N 121°30′43″W
- Built: ca. 1900
- Architectural style: Queen Anne/Eastlake
- NRHP reference No.: 88000085

Significant dates
- Added to NRHP: March 9, 1988
- Removed from NRHP: February 21, 2018

The Roe–Parker House is a historic house in Hood River, Oregon, United States.

The house was listed on the National Register of Historic Places in 1988. It was relocated from its original site adjacent to the Hood River Library in 2002, to make way for expansion of the library building. It was removed from the National Register in 2018.

== See also ==
- National Register of Historic Places listings in Hood River County, Oregon
