= Mount Hood Hotel Annex =

- U.S. National Register of Historic Places
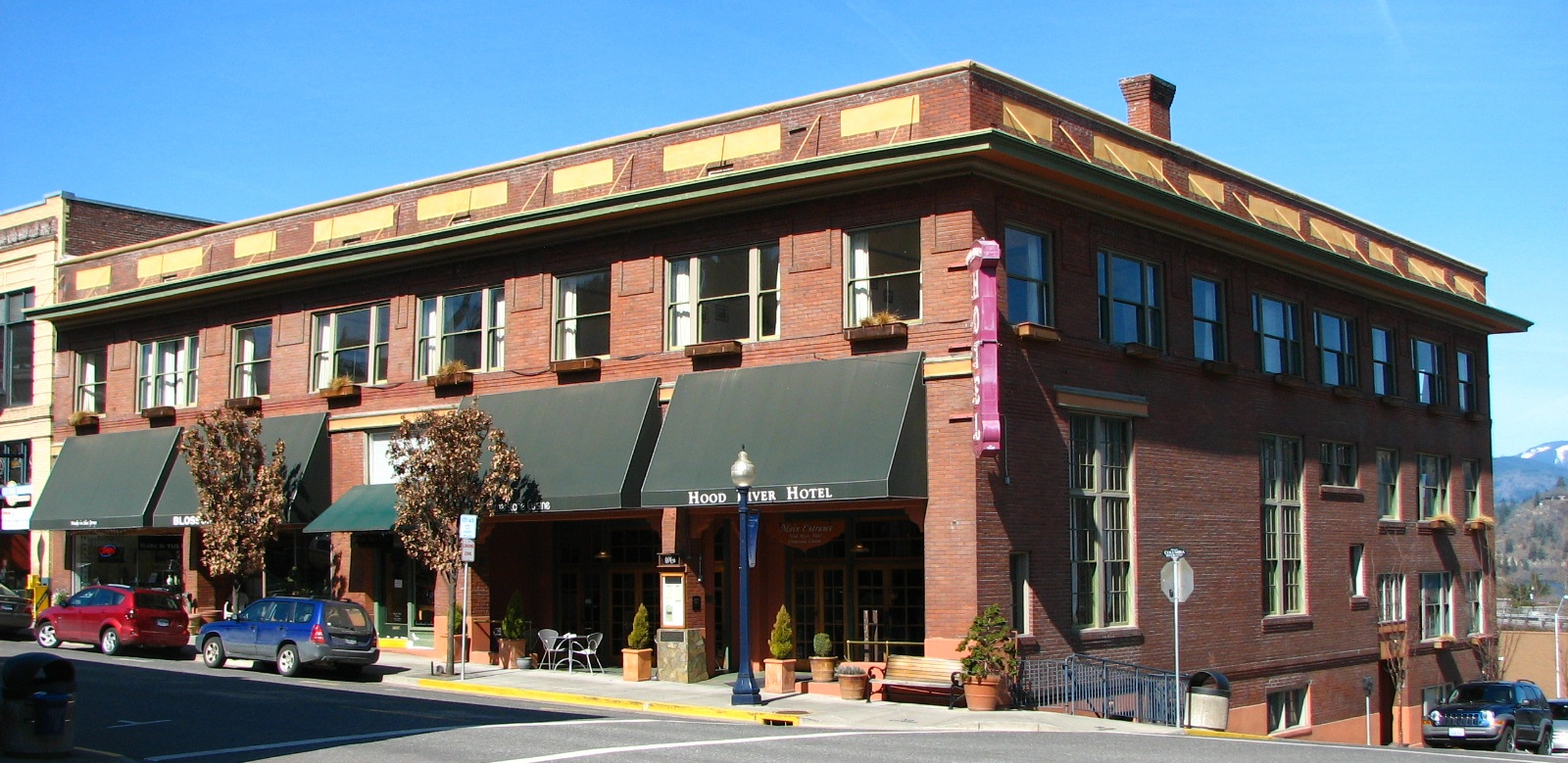
- The Mount Hood Hotel Annex in 2009

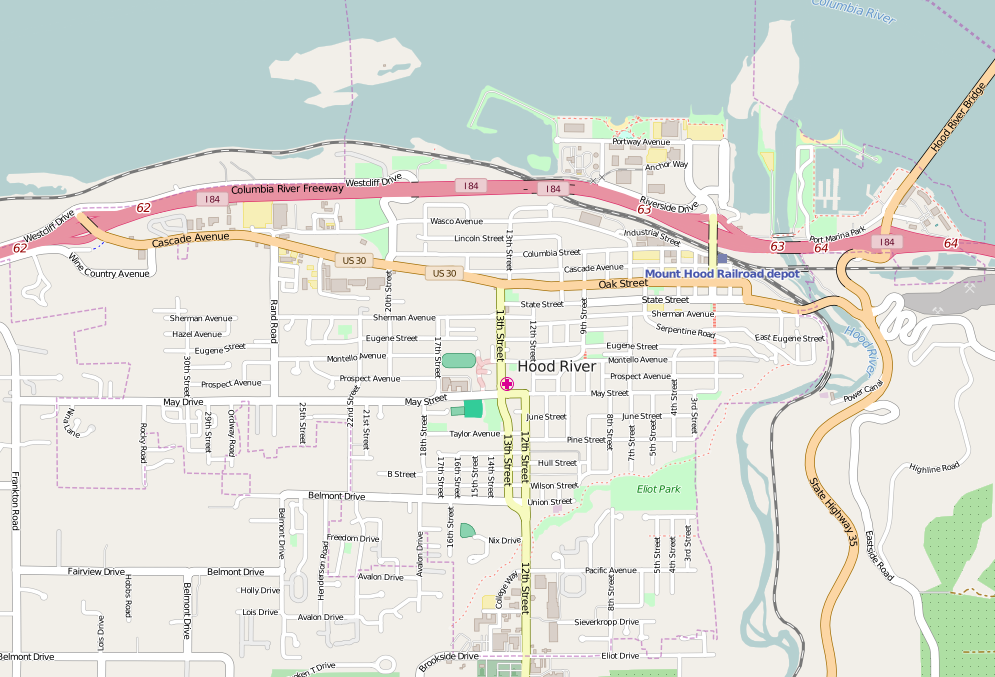
- Location within Hood River OR
- Location: 102–108 Oak Street; Hood River, Oregon
- Coordinates: 45°42′33″N 121°30′42″W
- Area: Approx. 0.25 acres (0.10 ha)
- Built: 1911–1912
- Built by: Mathison and Anderson; 1926 renovations by George M. Post
- Architectural style: Commercial style
- NRHP reference No.: 93001511
- Added to NRHP: January 21, 1994

The Mount Hood Hotel Annex (currently operates as the Hood River Hotel) is a historic hotel building in Hood River, Oregon, United States. The brick building occupies a 100 by 100 feet (30 m × 30 m) lot at the northwest corner of Oak and First Streets in Hood River. It was completed in 1912 as an expansion of the Mt. Hood Hotel on the next lot. The original hotel was built in 1881. The original hotel was expanded after 1886, to three stories. It had a mansard observation tower and an encircling double veranda. The original building fronted on first street and the Oregon-Washington Railroad and Navigation Company passenger station and the Columbia River just north. As travel moved to automobile travel, the premier hotel to the north, took a back seat to the annex. The original building was closed after 1926 and then removed circa 1930.

It was listed on the National Register of Historic Places in 1994.

== See also ==
- National Register of Historic Places listings in Hood River County, Oregon
