= National Register of Historic Places listings in Hood River County, Oregon =

Location of Hood River County in Oregon

This list presents the full set of buildings, structures, objects, sites, or districts designated on the National Register of Historic Places in Hood River County, Oregon, United States, and offers brief descriptive information about each of them. The National Register recognizes places of national, state, or local historic significance across the United States. Out of over 90,000 National Register sites nationwide, Oregon is home to over 2,000, and 38 of those are found partially or wholly in Hood River County.

This National Park Service list is complete through NPS recent listings posted August 1, 2025.

== Current listings ==
	Name on the Register	Image	Date listed	Location	City or town	Description
1	Barlow Road	Barlow Road	April 13, 1992 (#92000334)	Mount Hood National Forest (Note: The Barlow Road is a linear district that runs north of and roughly parallel to the line of the White and Salmon rivers from southwest of Wamic to Rhododendron. See also Wasco and Clackamas counties.); 45°13′50″N 121°34′47″W	Wamic to Rhododendron	Beginning with its construction by Sam Barlow in 1846, this toll road provided the first overland connection for wagons between The Dalles and Oregon City over Mount Hood, and offered a majority of Oregon Trail emigrants an alternative to the hazardous raft passage down the Columbia River from The Dalles to Fort Vancouver.
2	Butler Bank	Butler Bank	January 27, 2000 (#99001713)	301 Oak Street; 45°42′31″N 121°30′49″W	Hood River	This 1924 bank was designed by celebrated architect A. E. Doyle, his only Egyptian Revival building in Oregon. The bank was incorporated in 1905 and led by Leslie Butler, one of Hood River's most important businessmen and a prominent philanthropist statewide. The bank folded in 1932.
3	Cascade Locks Marine Park	Cascade Locks Marine Park	May 15, 1974 (#74001686)	On the Columbia River; 45°40′09″N 121°53′43″W	Cascade Locks	The opening of the Cascade Locks and Canal in 1896 improved river commerce by allowing Columbia River steamboats to bypass the treacherous and usually impossible run through the Cascades Rapids. The canal was rendered unnecessary and partly submerged by construction of the Bonneville Dam in 1938.
4	Cascade Locks Work Center	Cascade Locks Work Center	April 11, 1986 (#86000829)	Mount Hood National Forest; 45°40′55″N 121°50′41″W	Cascade Locks	
5	Cliff Lodge	Cliff Lodge	May 5, 2000 (#00000445)	3345 Cascade Avenue; 45°42′36″N 121°32′43″W	Hood River vicinity	
6	Cloud Cap Inn	Cloud Cap Inn	October 18, 1974 (#74001687)	Northeast flank of Mount Hood; 45°24′15″N 121°39′16″W	Parkdale vicinity	
7	Cloud Cap – Tilly Jane Recreation Area Historic District	Cloud Cap – Tilly Jane Recreation Area Historic District	March 22, 1981 (#81000485)	South of Parkdale; 45°24′35″N 121°38′55″W	Parkdale vicinity	
8	Ernest S. and Clara C. Colby House	Ernest S. and Clara C. Colby House	July 14, 2000 (#00000804)	1219 Columbia Street; 45°42′35″N 121°31′28″W	Hood River	
9	Columbia Gorge Hotel	Columbia Gorge Hotel	September 21, 1979 (#79003736)	4000 Westcliff Drive; 45°42′42″N 121°33′15″W	Hood River	
10	Columbia River Highway Historic District	Columbia River Highway Historic District	December 12, 1983 (#83004168)	Roughly along the south side of the Columbia River (Note: The Columbia River Highway Historic District is a linear district with the Sandy River Bridge, Troutdale, at its west end, and the Chenoweth Creek Bridge, The Dalles, at the east end. See also Multnomah and Wasco counties.); 45°42′25″N 121°34′55″W	Troutdale to The Dalles	Constructed between 1913 and 1922, this was the first scenic highway in the United States. Designed specifically to provide visitors access to the most outstanding of the scenic features of the Columbia River Gorge, the highway is also an outstanding example of modern highway development for its pioneering advances in road engineering.
11	Simpson Copple House	Simpson Copple House	March 6, 1987 (#87000362)	911 Montello Avenue; 45°42′19″N 121°31′14″W	Hood River	This 1906, late vernacular Queen Anne house is one of the best preserved examples of its style in Hood River. Its size, state of preservation, and fine detail work on its gables especially stand out from similar houses in the area.
12	Davidson–Childs House	Davidson–Childs House	October 30, 1989 (#89001864)	725 Oak Street; 45°42′31″N 121°31′07″W	Hood River	
13	Edward J. DeHart House	Edward J. DeHart House	February 23, 1990 (#90000276)	3820 Westcliff Drive; 45°42′47″N 121°32′50″W	Hood River	
14	John C. Duckwall House	John C. Duckwall House	June 16, 1989 (#89000512)	811 Oak Street; 45°42′31″N 121°31′10″W	Hood River	
15	First National Bank of Hood River	First National Bank of Hood River	January 26, 2006 (#05001555)	304 Oak Street; 45°42′33″N 121°30′49″W	Hood River	
16	Orrin B. Hartley House	Orrin B. Hartley House	October 30, 1989 (#89001860)	1029 State Street; 45°42′28″N 121°31′23″W	Hood River	
17	Heilbronner Block	Heilbronner Block	January 26, 2006 (#05001554)	100–118 3rd Street; 45°42′34″N 121°30′49″W	Hood River	
18	Martin and Carrie Hill House	Martin and Carrie Hill House	July 17, 2007 (#07000760)	2265 Highway 35; 45°39′28″N 121°30′47″W	Hood River vicinity	Built on Hood River Valley orchard land in 1910, this may be the finest and most ornate example of Dutch Colonial Revival architecture locally, incorporating many of the distinctive features of the style. The house also displays a high degree of historic integrity on both the exterior and interior, with only minor alterations.
19	Hood River County Library and Georgiana Smith Park	Hood River County Library and Georgiana Smith Park	May 29, 1998 (#98000605)	502 State Street; 45°42′29″N 121°30′55″W	Hood River	
20	Hood River High School	Hood River High School	May 5, 1999 (#99000534)	1602 May Street; 45°42′15″N 121°31′43″W	Hood River	
21	I.O.O.F. – Paris Fair Building	I.O.O.F. – Paris Fair Building	October 25, 1990 (#90001598)	315 Oak Street; 45°42′31″N 121°30′51″W	Hood River	
22	Robert and Mabel Loomis House	Robert and Mabel Loomis House	October 25, 1990 (#90001599)	1100 State Street; 45°42′30″N 121°31′23″W	Hood River	
23	Mount Hood Hotel Annex	Mount Hood Hotel Annex	January 21, 1994 (#93001511)	102–108 Oak Street; 45°42′33″N 121°30′42″W	Hood River	
24	Mount Hood Railroad Linear Historic District	Mount Hood Railroad Linear Historic District	January 24, 1994 (#93001507)	Along the Mount Hood Railroad right-of-way from Hood River to Parkdale, northern terminus at 110 Railroad Avenue, Hood River; 45°36′25″N 121°34′31″W	Hood River to Parkdale	
25	Mount Hood School House	Mount Hood School House	April 30, 1987 (#87000680)	Oregon Route 35; 45°32′21″N 121°34′00″W	Mount Hood (Note: The Mount Hood School House is located at the community of Mount Hood, rather than at the mountain for which the community was named.)	
26	Lester and Hazel Murphy House	Lester and Hazel Murphy House	October 25, 1990 (#90001600)	1006 Sherman Avenue; 45°42′26″N 121°31′18″W	Hood River	
27	Oak Grove Schoolhouse	Oak Grove Schoolhouse	March 5, 1979 (#79002062)	2121 Reed Road; 45°39′39″N 121°35′11″W	Hood River vicinity	
28	Oregon–Washington Railroad and Navigation Company Passenger Station	Oregon–Washington Railroad and Navigation Company Passenger Station	July 28, 1988 (#88001159)	Foot of 1st Street; 45°42′36″N 121°30′42″W	Hood River	
29	Parkdale Ranger Station	Parkdale Ranger Station	April 11, 1986 (#86000822)	45°31′12″N 121°35′26″W	Parkdale vicinity	
30	Miles B. and Eleanor Potter House	Miles B. and Eleanor Potter House	October 8, 1992 (#92001326)	4095 Belmont Drive; 45°41′35″N 121°33′30″W	Hood River vicinity	
31	Ries–Thompson House	Ries–Thompson House	October 8, 1992 (#92001327)	4993 Baseline Road; 45°31′11″N 121°35′56″W	Parkdale	
32	Shaw–Dumble House	Shaw–Dumble House	October 30, 1990 (#90001601)	318 9th Street; 45°42′27″N 121°31′14″W	Hood River	
33	J. E. Slade House	J. E. Slade House	February 23, 1989 (#89000065)	1209 State Street; 45°42′29″N 121°31′25″W	Hood River	
34	E. L. Smith Building	E. L. Smith Building	June 19, 1991 (#91000801)	213–215 Oak Street; 45°42′32″N 121°30′48″W	Hood River	
35	Clark Thompson House	Clark Thompson House	March 2, 1989 (#89000124)	22 NW Cragmont Avenue; 45°40′25″N 121°53′03″W	Cascade Locks	
36	Valley Theater	Valley Theater	June 1, 1990 (#90000842)	4945 Baseline Road; 45°31′10″N 121°35′49″W	Parkdale	
37	Waucoma Hotel	Waucoma Hotel	December 10, 1981 (#81000484)	102–108 2nd Street; 45°42′34″N 121°30′45″W	Hood River	

== Former listings ==
	Name on the Register	Image	Date listed	Date removed	Location	City or town	Description
1	Roe–Parker House	Roe–Parker House	March 9, 1988 (#88000085)	February 21, 2018	110 Sherman Avenue (Note: At the time it was listed on the National Register, the Roe–Parker House was still located at its original site at 416 State Street, coordinates 45°42′30″N 121°30′55″W, adjacent to the 1914 Hood River Library. It was relocated in 2002 to make way for expansion of the library building.); 45°42′28″N 121°30′43″W	Hood River	Relocated in 2002 for expansion of the Hood River library.

== See also ==
- National Register of Historic Places listings in Oregon
- Listings in neighboring counties: Clackamas, Klickitat, Multnomah, Skamania, Wasco
- List of National Historic Landmarks in Oregon
- Historic preservation
- History of Oregon
- Lists of Oregon-related topics
