= Hazel Murphy =

Hazel Murphy may refer to:

- Hazel Murphy, character on Sealab 2021
- Lester and Hazel Murphy House; see National Register of Historic Places listings in Hood River County, Oregon
