= Alco Apartments =

Historic building in Portland, Oregon, U.S.

- U.S. National Register of Historic Places
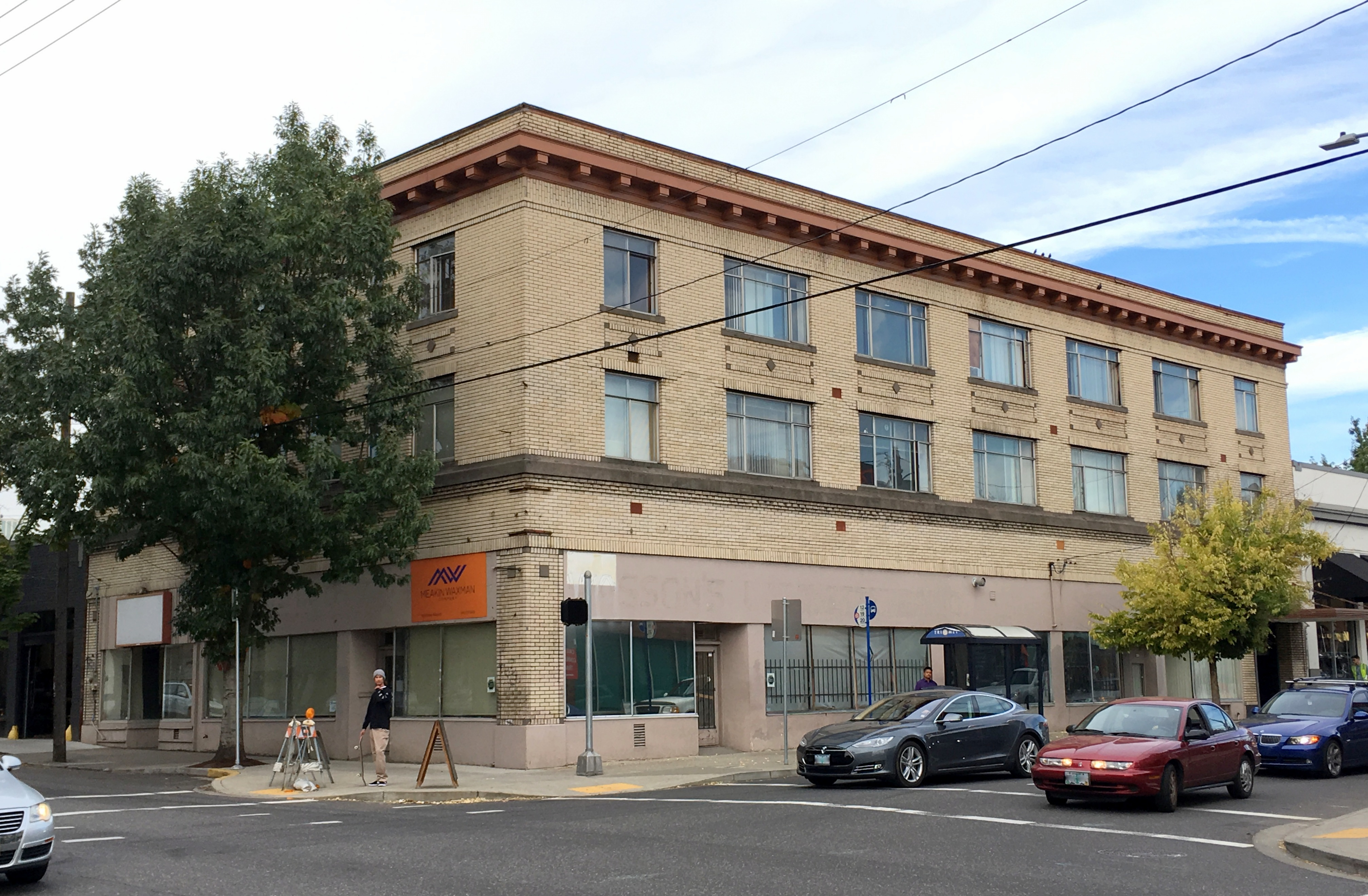
- The building's exterior in 2016

- Location within the United States Location within Oregon Location within Portland, Oregon
- Location: 100–110 NE Martin Luther King Jr. Boulevard; Portland, Oregon
- Coordinates: 45°31′26″N 122°39′41″W
- Built: 1912
- Architect: MacNaughton & Raymond (original construction); George M. Post (1939 renovation)
- Architectural style: Commercial style
- NRHP reference No.: 100000499
- Added to NRHP: January 17, 2017

The Vivian Apartments, originally known as the Alco Apartments, are a historic, commercial/apartment building located in Portland, Oregon, United States. Built in 1912 at the northern end of Portland's eastside commercial core, the building typifies the mixed-use commercial development that occurred along Portland's streetcar lines in the eastside area during the early 20th century. It was noted for quality design and construction when it was built, and retains significant character-defining characteristics, including transom windows and recessed entries in the commercial spaces, original fenestration on the rear elevation, a prominent apartment entrance and lobby, and decorative cornice and masonry. The building's significance is strongly echoed in the 21st-century renaissance of mixed-use construction and streetcars in Portland, with a new-generation streetcar line on Martin Luther King Jr. Boulevard immediately opposite the west elevation.

The Alco Apartments were listed on the National Register of Historic Places in 2017.

== See also ==
- National Register of Historic Places listings in Northeast Portland, Oregon
