= Shaw–Dumble House =

Historic house in Oregon, United States

- U.S. National Register of Historic Places
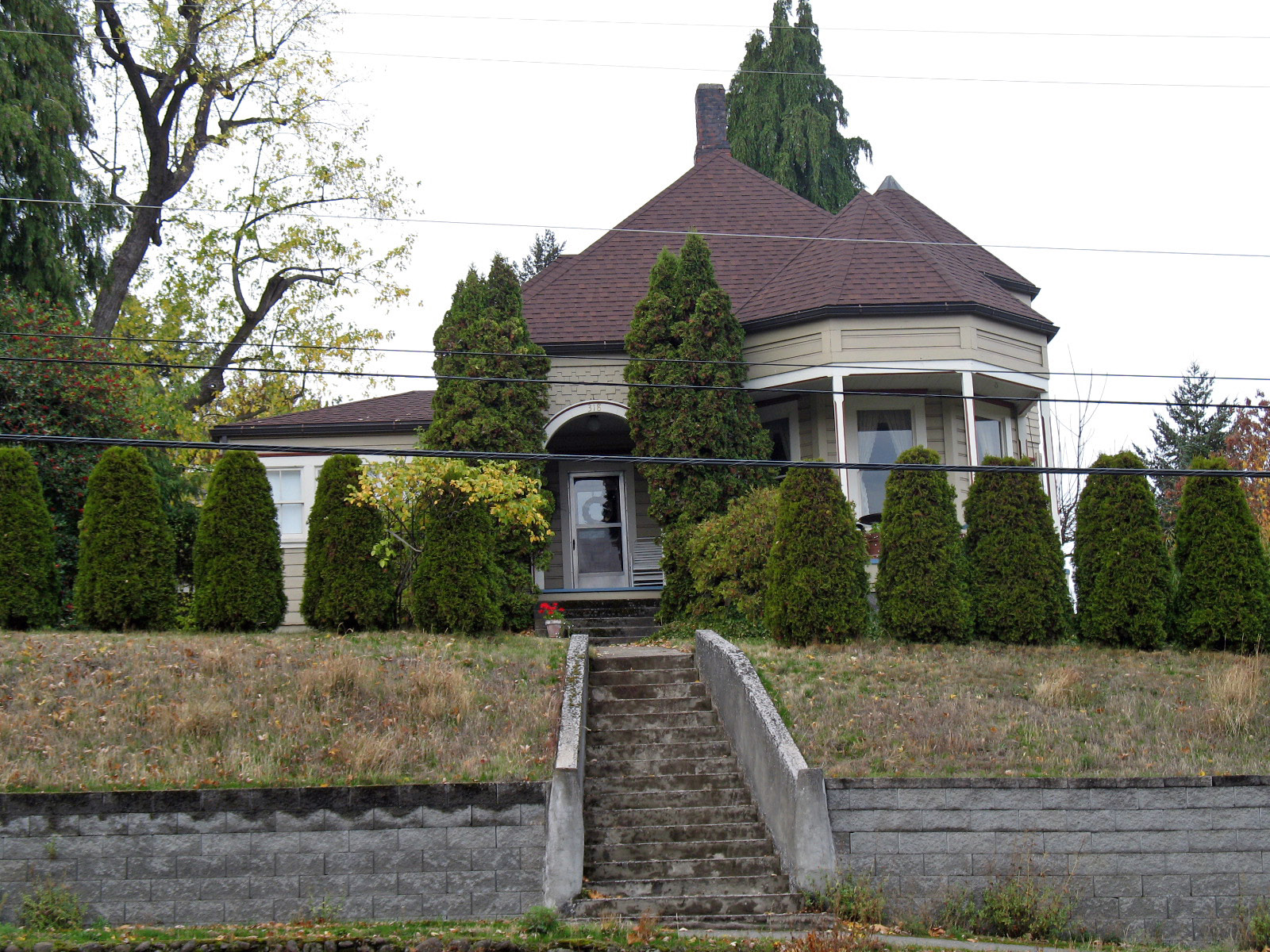
- The Shaw–Dumble House in 2009
- Location: 318 9th Street; Hood River, Oregon
- Coordinates: 45°42′27″N 121°31′14″W
- Area: 0.23 acres (0.093 ha)
- Built: 1898
- Architectural style: Queen Anne
- NRHP reference No.: 90001601
- Added to NRHP: October 30, 1990

The Shaw–Dumble House is a historic residence in Hood River, Oregon, United States.

The house was listed on the National Register of Historic Places in 1990.

== See also ==
- National Register of Historic Places listings in Hood River County, Oregon
