= Portland Subdivision =

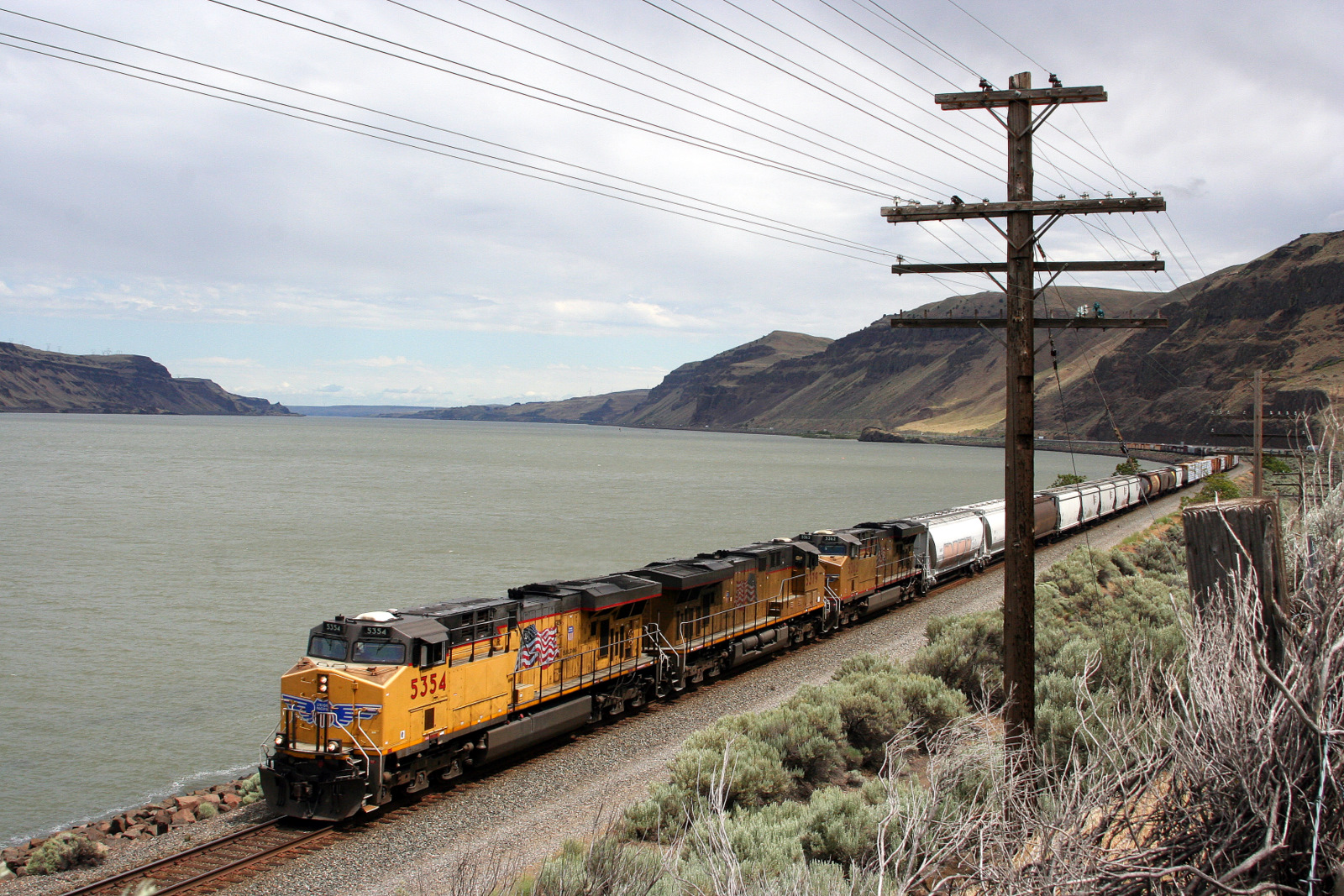
- A Union Pacific manifest freight on the line in 2010

Overview
- Owner: Union Pacific Railroad

Technical
- Line length: 185 mi (298 km)
- Track gauge: 1,435 mm (4 ft 8 1/2 in) standard gauge

The Portland Subdivision is a railway line in the state of Oregon in the United States. It is owned by the Union Pacific Railroad and runs 185 miles (298 km) from Portland, Oregon, to Hinkle, Oregon. The line runs east-west along the south bank of the Columbia River through the Columbia River Gorge.

== Route ==
The eastern end of the line is at Hinkle, Oregon, where it meets the La Grande Subdivision. The Oregon Trunk Subdivision of the BNSF Railway crosses over at Oregon Trunk Junction, 10 miles (16 km) east of The Dalles, Oregon. At Troutdale, on the eastern edge of Portland, the line splits: the Kenton Line continues northwest through northeast Portland, while the Graham Line heads due west into downtown Portland. The two lines meet at East Portland, just across the Willamette River from Portland Union Station. The line continues across the Willamette over the Steel Bridge to Union Station. There is no track connection between the Graham Line and the Steel Bridge.

== Operations ==
As of 2022, the Portland Subdivision hosts no passenger traffic, save for the small section in Portland from Union Station across to the Steel Bridge to the Brooklyn Subdivision. This hosts Amtrak Cascades and Coast Starlight, both of which operate between Portland and Eugene. The Pioneer, discontinued in 1997, provided service over the whole route, including stops in Hood River, the Dalles, and Hinkle.

As of 2003 the line handles between 22 and 24 freight trains daily.
