= Orrin B. Hartley House =

Historic house in Oregon, United States

- U.S. National Register of Historic Places
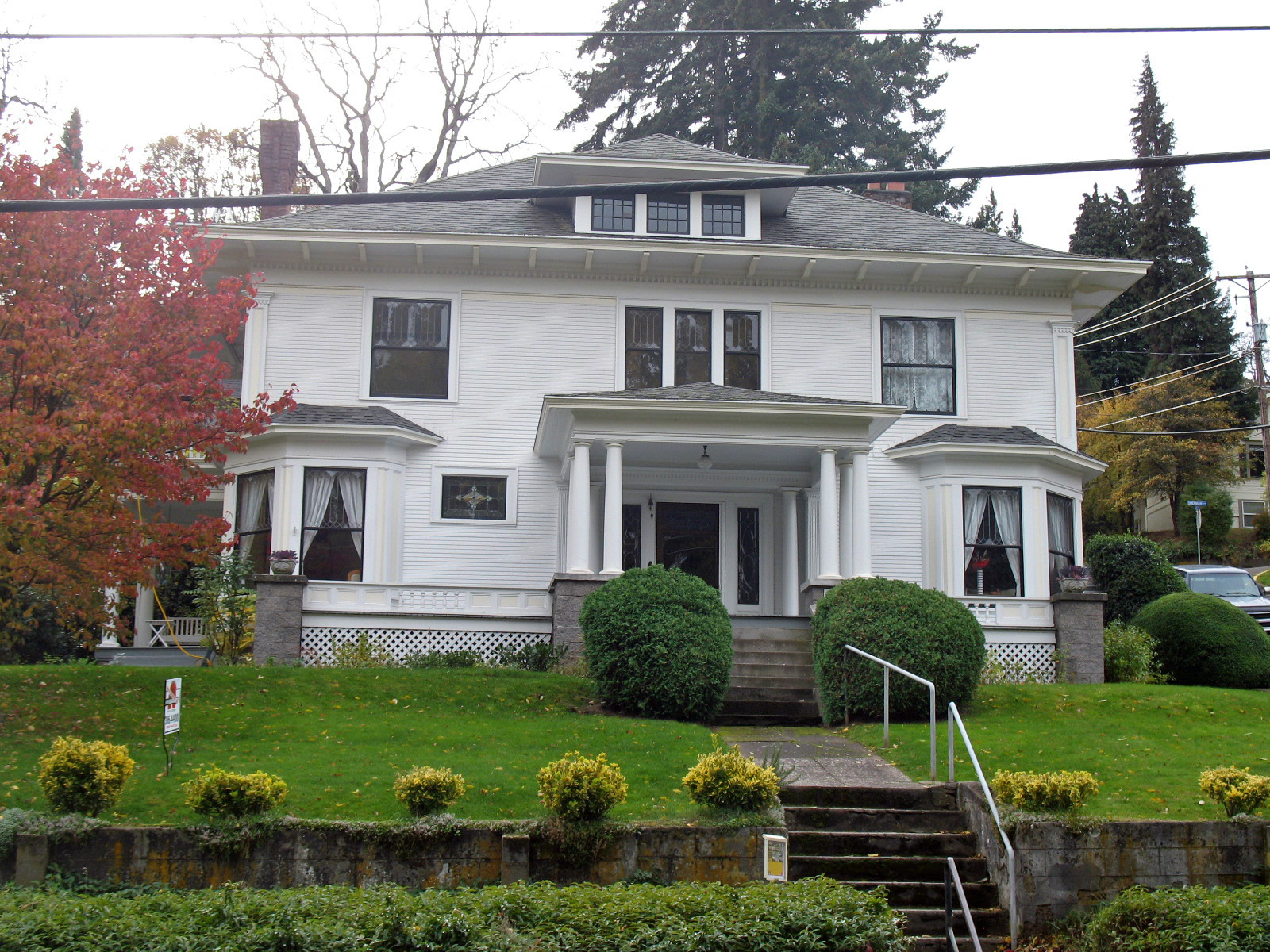
- The Hartley House in 2009

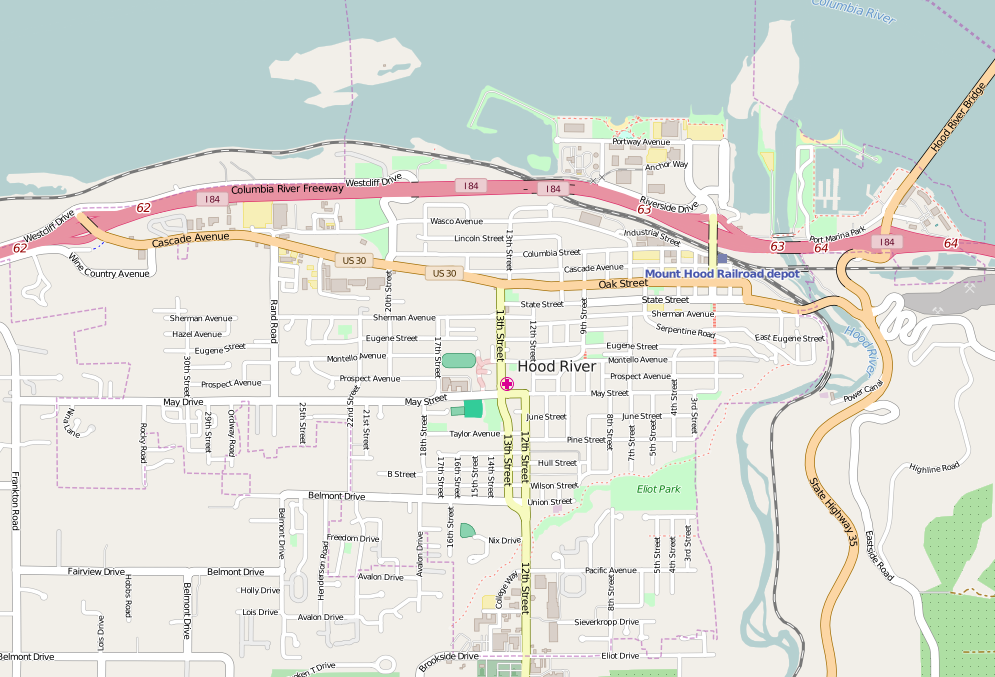
- Location within Hood River OR
- Location: 1029 State Street; Hood River, Oregon
- Coordinates: 45°42′28″N 121°31′23″W
- Area: 0.25 acres (0.10 ha)
- Built: 1907
- Built by: E. A. Jerome
- Architectural style: Colonial Revival
- NRHP reference No.: 89001860
- Added to NRHP: October 30, 1989

The Orrin B. Hartley House is a historic residence located in Hood River, Oregon, United States.

The house was listed on the National Register of Historic Places in 1989.

== See also ==
- National Register of Historic Places listings in Hood River County, Oregon
