= Waucoma Hotel =

United States historic place

- U.S. National Register of Historic Places
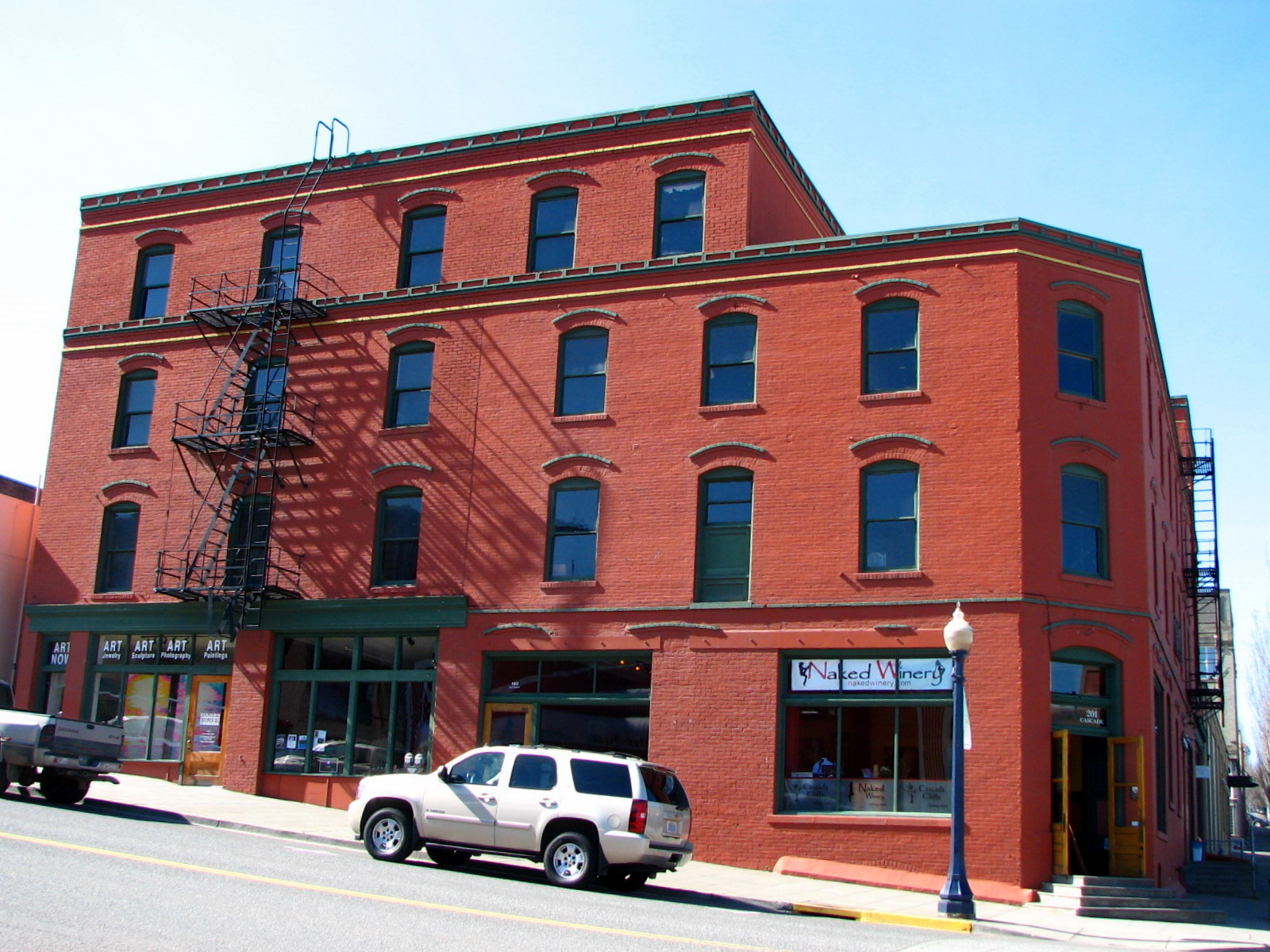
- The Waucoma Hotel in 2009

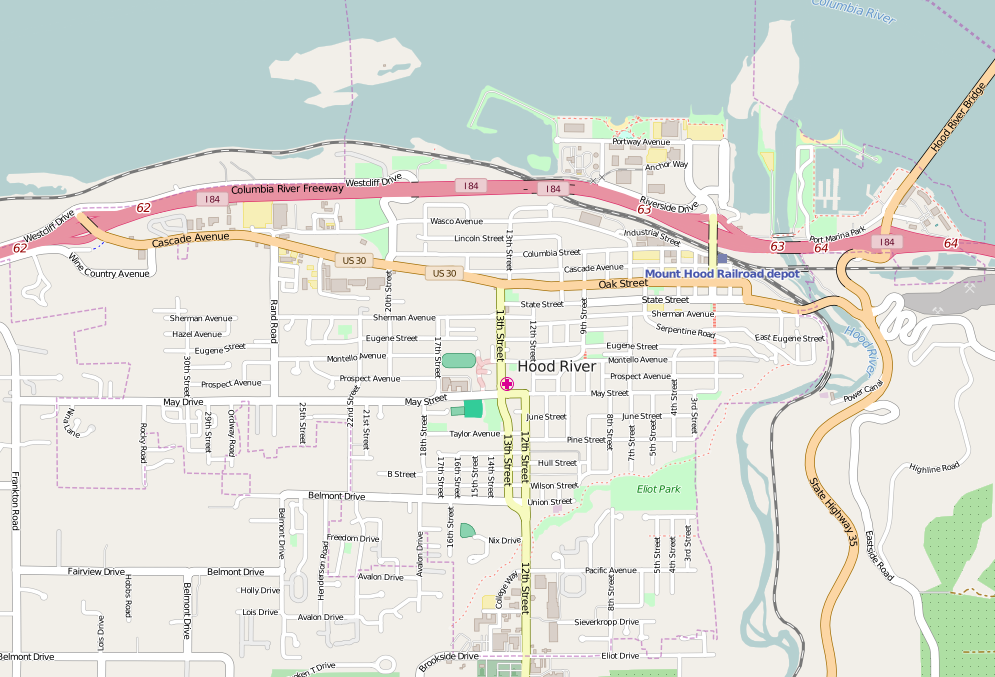
- Location within Hood River OR
- Location: 102–108 2nd Street; Hood River, Oregon
- Coordinates: 45°42′34″N 121°30′45″W
- Area: Less than 1 acre (0.40 ha)
- Built: 1904 (original), 1910 (addition)
- Architect: C. J. Crandall (original), R. R. Bartlett (addition)
- Architectural style: Commercial style
- NRHP reference No.: 81000484
- Added to NRHP: December 10, 1981

The Waucoma Hotel is a historic hotel building in Hood River, Oregon, United States.

The hotel was listed on the National Register of Historic Places in 1981.

The Waucoma Hotel was remodeled and reopened in 1910 as the Hotel Oregon. The hotel closed in 1973.

== Renovation and Reopening ==
In 2023, the Waucoma Hotel building began an extensive renovation to restore its original function as a hotel. The redevelopment, led by Carrington "Ceb" Barrs and Gabriel Genauer, aims to modernize the historic structure while preserving its architectural character. The project includes structural and seismic upgrades, expansion of the basement level, and the installation of a replica of the original rooftop trellis.

The updated hotel, renamed Lightwell Hotel and Spa, features 69 guest rooms, a rooftop bar, a Mediterranean restaurant, a large soaking pool and spa facilities offering massage services. The boutique hotel opened in November 2025.

== See also ==
- National Register of Historic Places listings in Hood River County, Oregon
