= Hood River station =

Railway station in Hood River, Oregon, United States

Hood River, OR
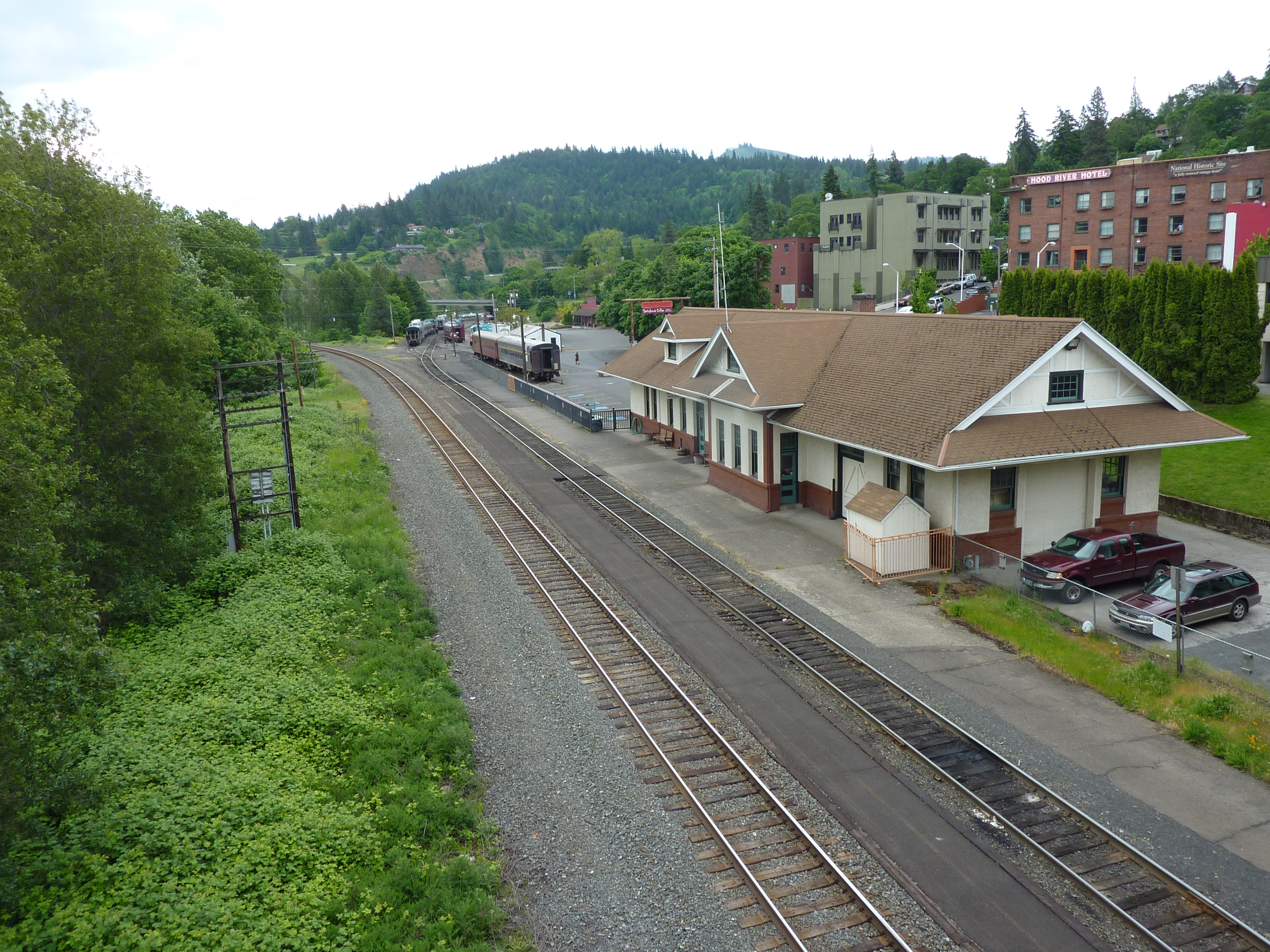
- A trackside view of the station in 2011, with Mount Hood Railway equipment in the background.

General information
- Location: 1st Street and Cascade Avenue; Hood River, Oregon 97031
- System: Former Union Pacific Railroad and Amtrak, current Mount Hood Railroad station
- Owner: Mount Hood Railroad
- Lines: Portland Subdivision; Mount Hood Railroad
- Platforms: 1 side, 1 island platform
- Tracks: 2

Construction
- Parking: Yes
- Accessible: Yes

Other information
- Station code: HOO

History
- Opened: 1882, 1977
- Closed: 1997 (Amtrak service)
- Rebuilt: 1911

Services
Preceding station	Heritage railroads	Following station
Terminus	Mount Hood Railroad	Pine Grove towards Parkdale

Former services
Preceding station	Amtrak	Following station
Portland toward Seattle	Pioneer	The Dalles toward Chicago
Cascade Locks 1981–1988 toward Seattle	Pioneer	The Dalles toward Chicago
Preceding station	Union Pacific Railroad	Following station
Lindsey toward Portland	Portland – Granger	Mosier toward Granger
- Oregon–Washington Railroad & Navigation Company Passenger Station
- U.S. National Register of Historic Places
- U.S. Historic district – Contributing property
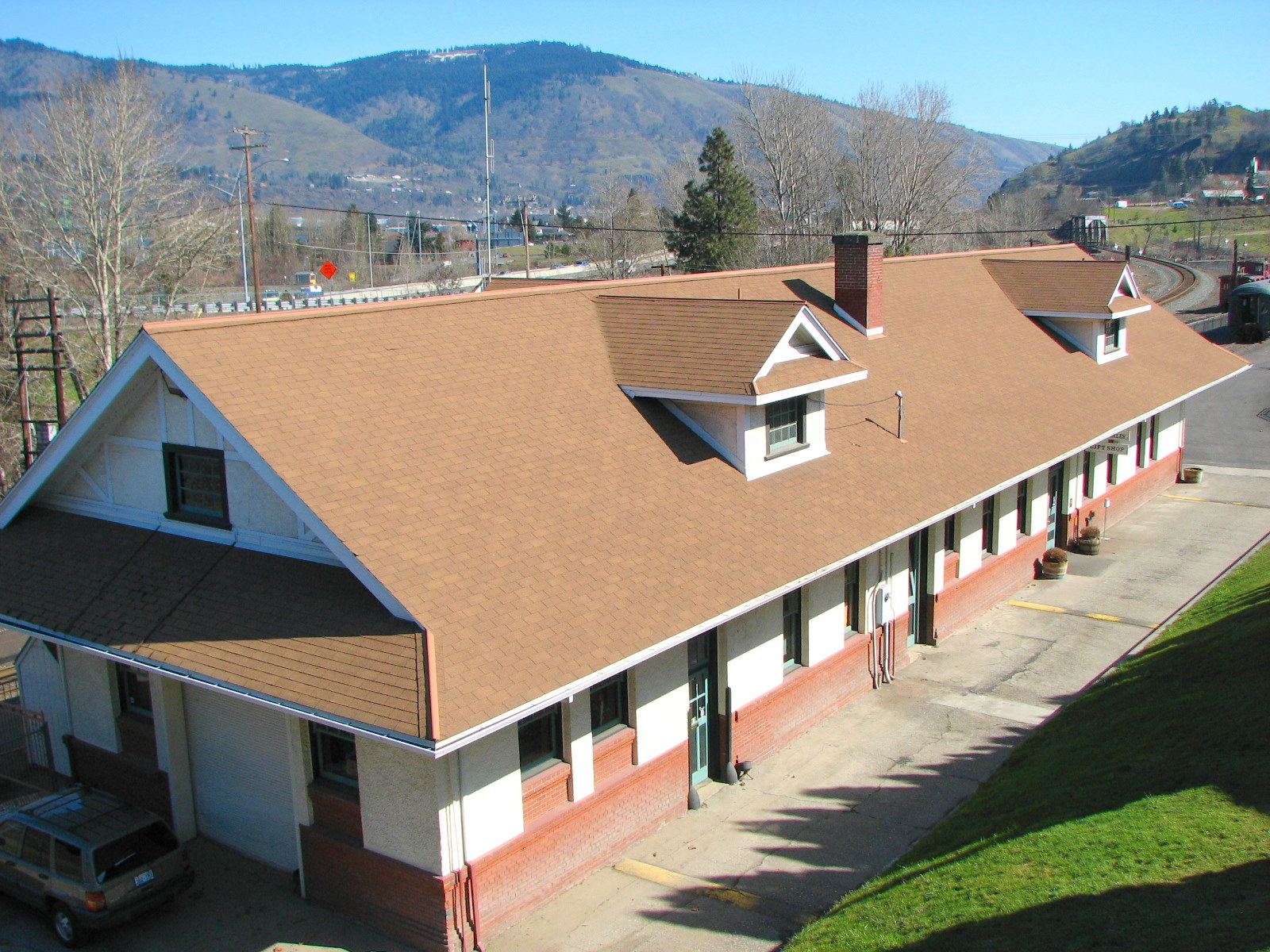
- The station in 2009.
- Location: Foot of First St., Hood River, Oregon
- Coordinates: 45°42′36″N 121°30′42″W
- Area: Less than 1 acre (0.40 ha)
- Built: 1911
- Architectural style: Bungalow/craftsman
- Part of: Mount Hood Railroad Linear Historic District (ID93001507)
- NRHP reference No.: 88001159
- Added to NRHP: July 28, 1988
Location

The Hood River station is a historic train station in Hood River, Oregon, currently serving the heritage Mount Hood Railroad. The station was listed on the National Register of Historic Places in 1988 as the Oregon–Washington Railroad and Navigation Company Passenger Station. The station was built by the Oregon–Washington Railroad and Navigation Company, a subsidiary of the Union Pacific Railroad, in 1911. Amtrak's Pioneer also used the station and nearby area from 1977 to 1997.

== History ==
The railroad first reached Hood River in 1882 with the arrival of the Oregon Railroad and Navigation Company (OR&N). The OR&N built eastward from Portland, eventually reaching Huntington in 1884, near the border with Idaho. In 1882, a two-story wooden depot was built at Hood River. As the town grew, a new station was seen as necessary. The current building was completed in 1911, on the same site as the previous depot. In 1918, a runaway locomotive struck the west side of the station.

After a series of corporate restructuring, the Oregon–Washington Railroad and Navigation Company was incorporated in 1910, still as a subsidiary of the Union Pacific Railroad. Over the next decades, the Union Pacific branding replaced the Oregon–Washington Railroad. It its heyday, the station served inter-city trains such as the City of Portland, Pacific Limited, Portland Rose, and The Spokane. These provided connections with Chicago, Omaha, and Spokane, among others. The NRHP nomination for the building listed passenger and freight service as ending in 1958, but timetables for the Union Pacific show service to Hood River as far as 1969. The previously independent Mount Hood Railroad was purchased by Union Pacific in 1967. This line to Parkdale met the Union Pacific main line just east of the section. The original Mount Hood Railroad depot, east of this station site, was torn down by the Union Pacific in 1971.

With the end of private inter-city rail in the United States and the formation of Amtrak on May 1, 1971, Hood River was initially not served. The station regained service with the formation of the Pioneer in 1977. Amtrak did not utilize the station building, and instead installed a 10 ft × 20 ft (3.0 m × 6.1 m) metal waiting shelter to the east. Union Pacific continued to use the building until 1984. On November 2, 1987, a group of local investors purchased the building and line to Parksdale from Union Pacific and formed the Mount Hood Railroad Corporation. The station was repurposed to serve as the headquarters of the corporation, and it is the present use of the station. Amtrak also began to use the station building in the early 1990s, but the Pioneer was discontinued in 1997. The Mount Hood Railway again sold to Iowa Pacific Holdings in 2008, and in 2019, county officials have indicated they are prepared to seize the property due to back taxes.

The station and surrounding area has been noted in a study by the Oregon Department of Transportation as being in good condition for possible reintroduction of Amtrak service. The station is noted as being accessible access to the building, but work would be required to upgrade the station's island platform that would be necessary for service. Greyhound Lines (and listed as Amtrak Thruway) provides service to Hood River between Portland–Boise, at a stop adjacent to the station.

== Station description ==
The 1911 built station was designed in a Craftsman style, and is one and a half stories tall. It is noted have dimensions of 126 ft × 30 ft (38.4 m × 9.1 m) in a rectangular shape. The interior of the station was initially built with two waiting rooms, one for women and one for men. These were later combined into one by the Union Pacific. The interior of the building also contains a ticket area, office space, and a baggage room.

== See also ==
- National Register of Historic Places listings in Hood River County, Oregon
