= Lester and Hazel Murphy House =

Historic house in Oregon, United States

- U.S. National Register of Historic Places
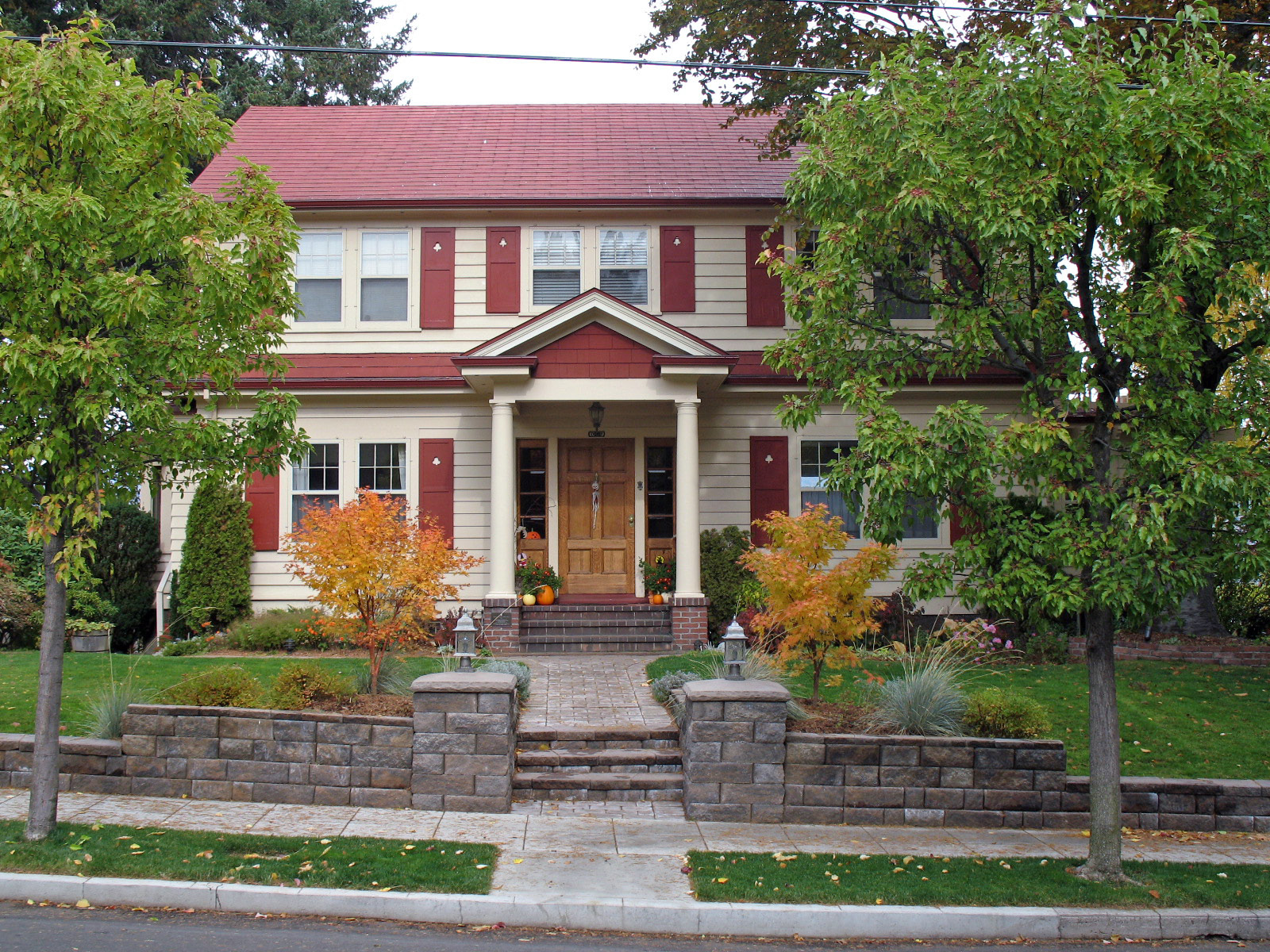
- The Murphy House in 2009

- Location within Oregon Location within the United States
- Location: 1006 Sherman Avenue; Hood River, Oregon
- Coordinates: 45°42′26″N 121°31′18″W
- Area: 0.34 acres (0.14 ha)
- Built: 1925
- Architectural style: Dutch Colonial Revival
- NRHP reference No.: 90001600
- Added to NRHP: October 25, 1990

The Lester and Hazel Murphy House is a historic house located in Hood River, Oregon, United States.

== Description and history ==
The 1 1/2-story house displays many of the distinctive characteristics of the Dutch Colonial Revival style, with its rectilinear form, bilateral symmetry, gambrel roof with eave returns, paired quarter-circle windows on the gable ends and continuous front and rear shed dormers. It was listed on the National Register of Historic Places on October 25, 1990.

== See also ==
- National Register of Historic Places listings in Hood River County, Oregon
