= John C. Duckwall House =

Historic house in Oregon, United States

- U.S. National Register of Historic Places
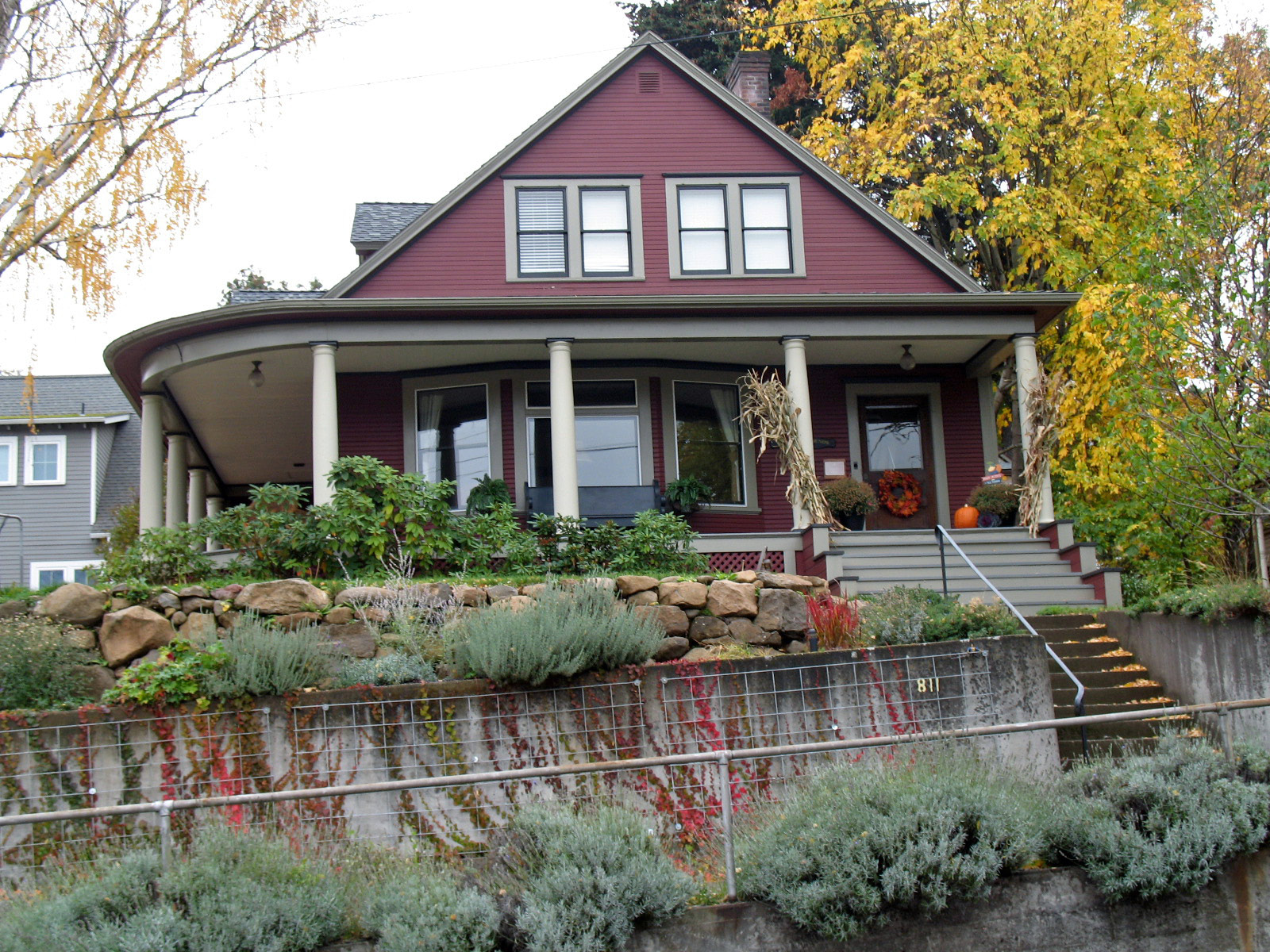
- The Duckwall House in 2009

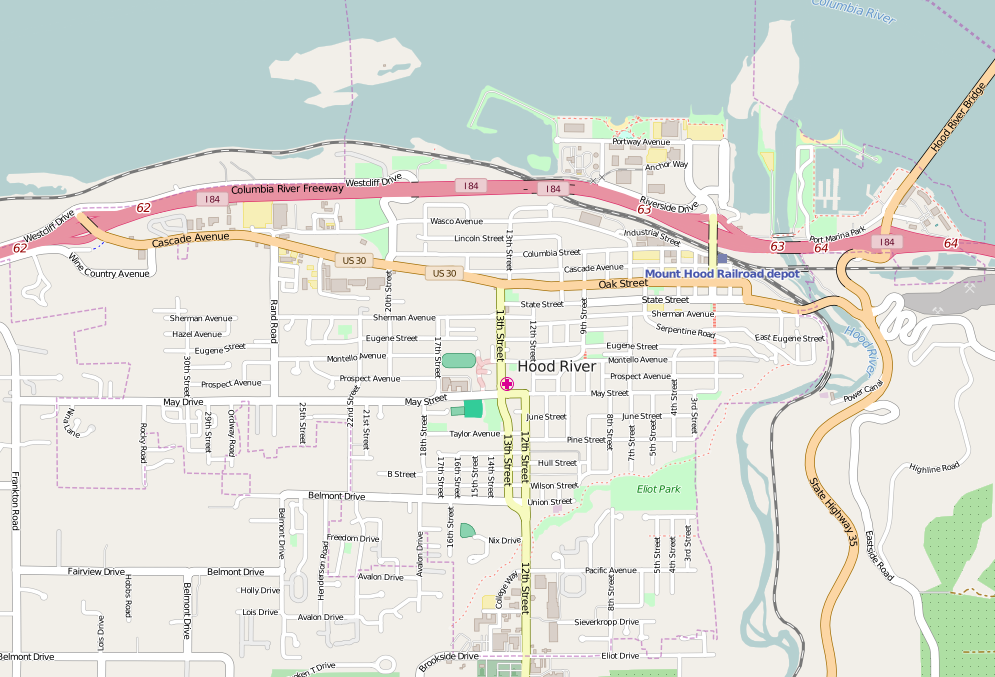
- Location within Hood River OR
- Location: 811 Oak Street; Hood River, Oregon
- Coordinates: 45°42′31″N 121°31′10″W
- Area: 0.41 acres (0.17 ha)
- Built: ca. 1906
- Architectural style: Vernacular, with Colonial Revival details
- NRHP reference No.: 89000512
- Added to NRHP: June 16, 1989

The John C. Duckwall House is a historic residence in Hood River, Oregon, United States.

The house was listed on the National Register of Historic Places in 1989.

== See also ==
- National Register of Historic Places listings in Hood River County, Oregon
