= Robert and Mabel Loomis House =

Historic house in Oregon, United States

- U.S. National Register of Historic Places
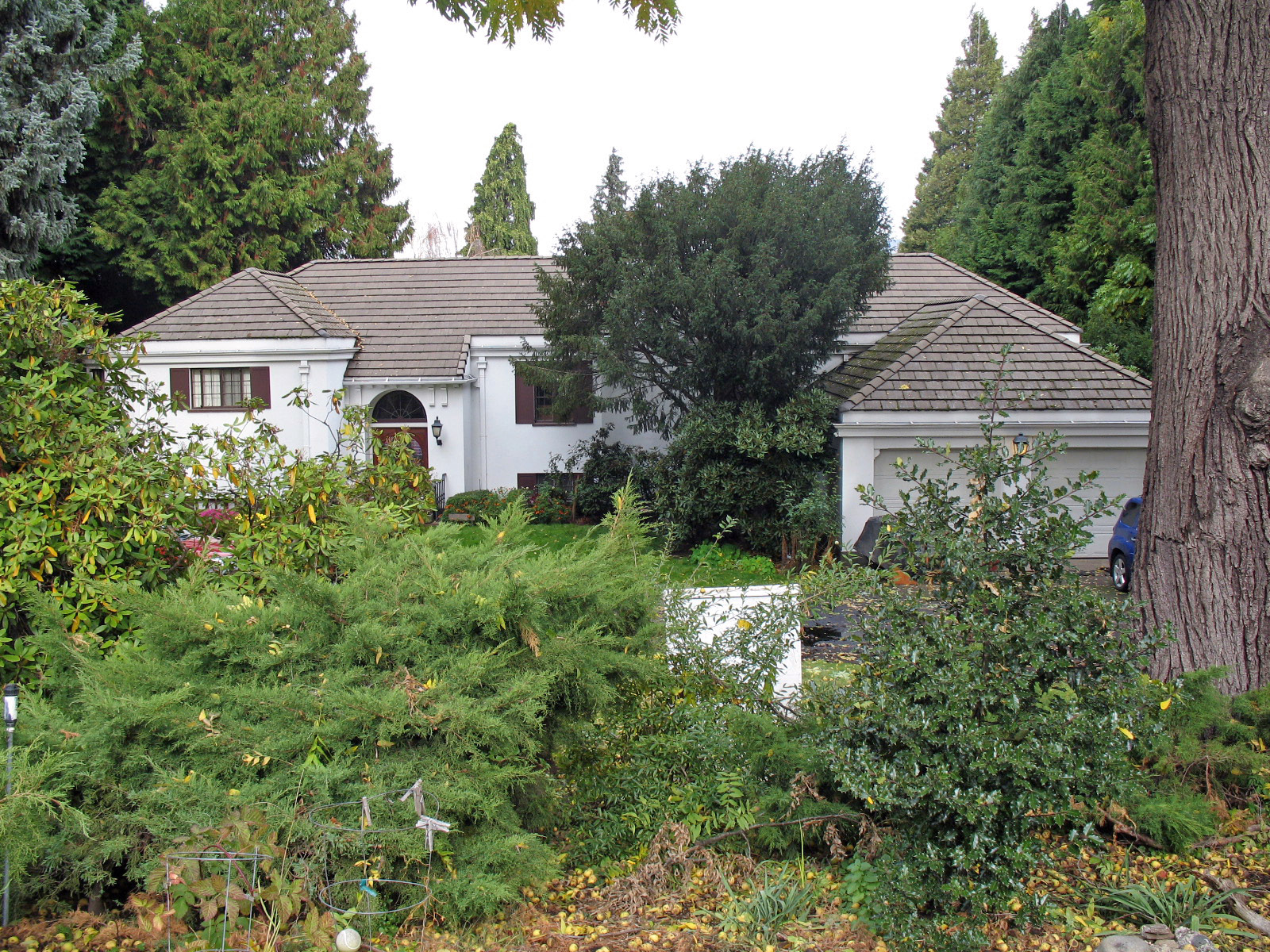
- The Loomis House in 2009

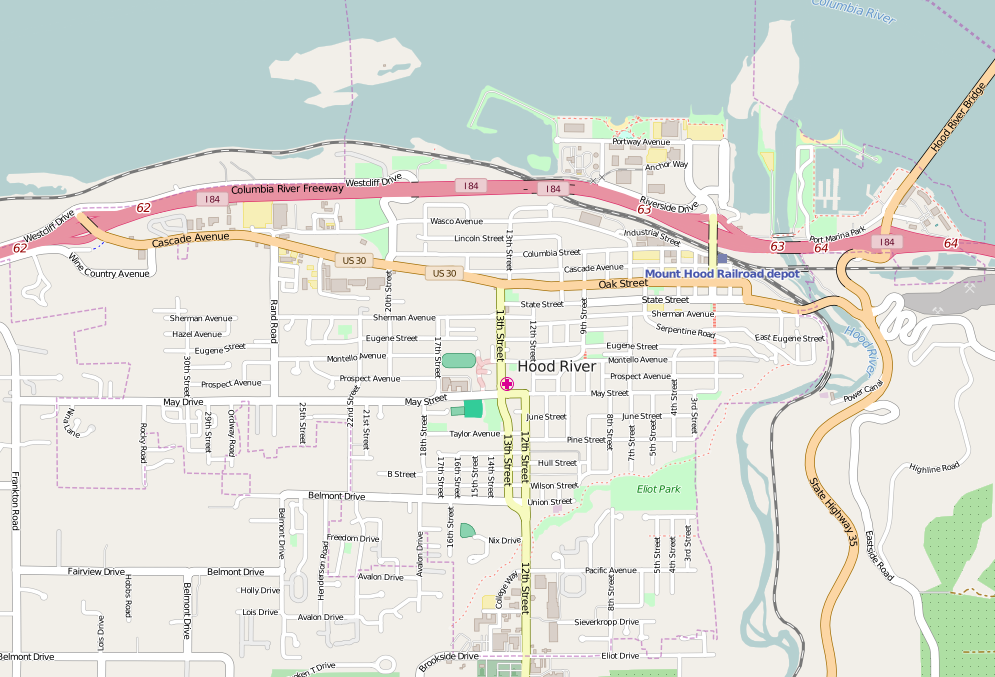
- Location within Hood River OR
- Location: 1100 State Street; Hood River, Oregon
- Coordinates: 45°42′30″N 121°31′23″W
- Area: 0.68 acres (0.28 ha)
- Built: 1938
- Architect: Percy D. Bentley
- Architectural style: Mediterranean Revival
- NRHP reference No.: 90001599
- Added to NRHP: October 25, 1990

The Robert and Mabel Loomis House is a historic residence located in Hood River, Oregon, United States.

The house was listed on the National Register of Historic Places in 1990.

== See also ==
- National Register of Historic Places listings in Hood River County, Oregon
