= Mount Hood Parkdale, Oregon =

Unincorporated community in the state of Oregon, United States

Coordinates: 45.519839°N 121.596742°W

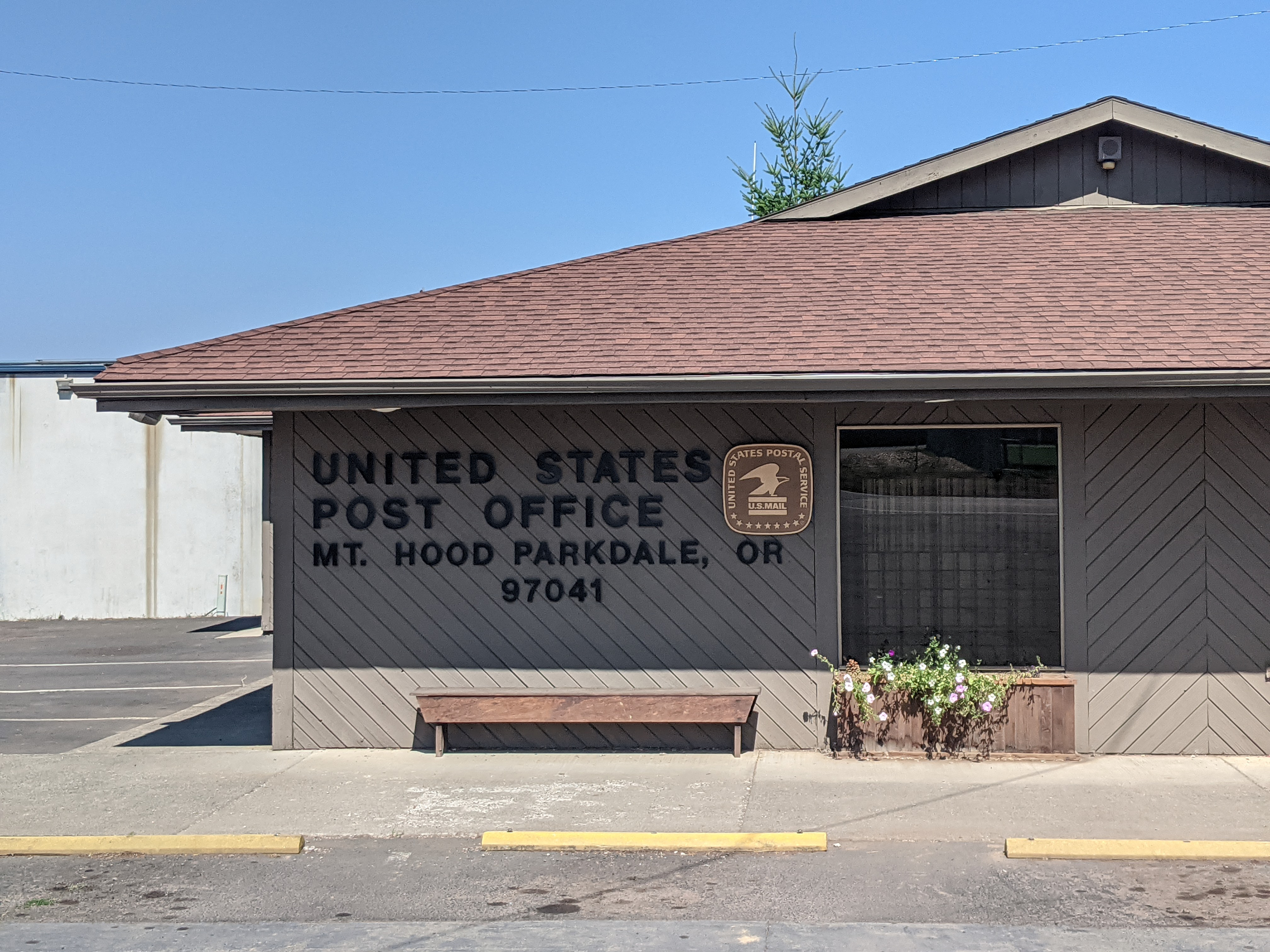
Post office for the US Postal Service-designated place of Mount Hood Parkdale

Mount Hood Parkdale is the official United States Postal Service-designated name of the combined post offices of the communities of Mount Hood and Parkdale in the U.S. state of Oregon. Its ZIP code is 97041.
