= Ernest S. and Clara C. Colby House =

Historic house in Oregon, United States

- U.S. National Register of Historic Places
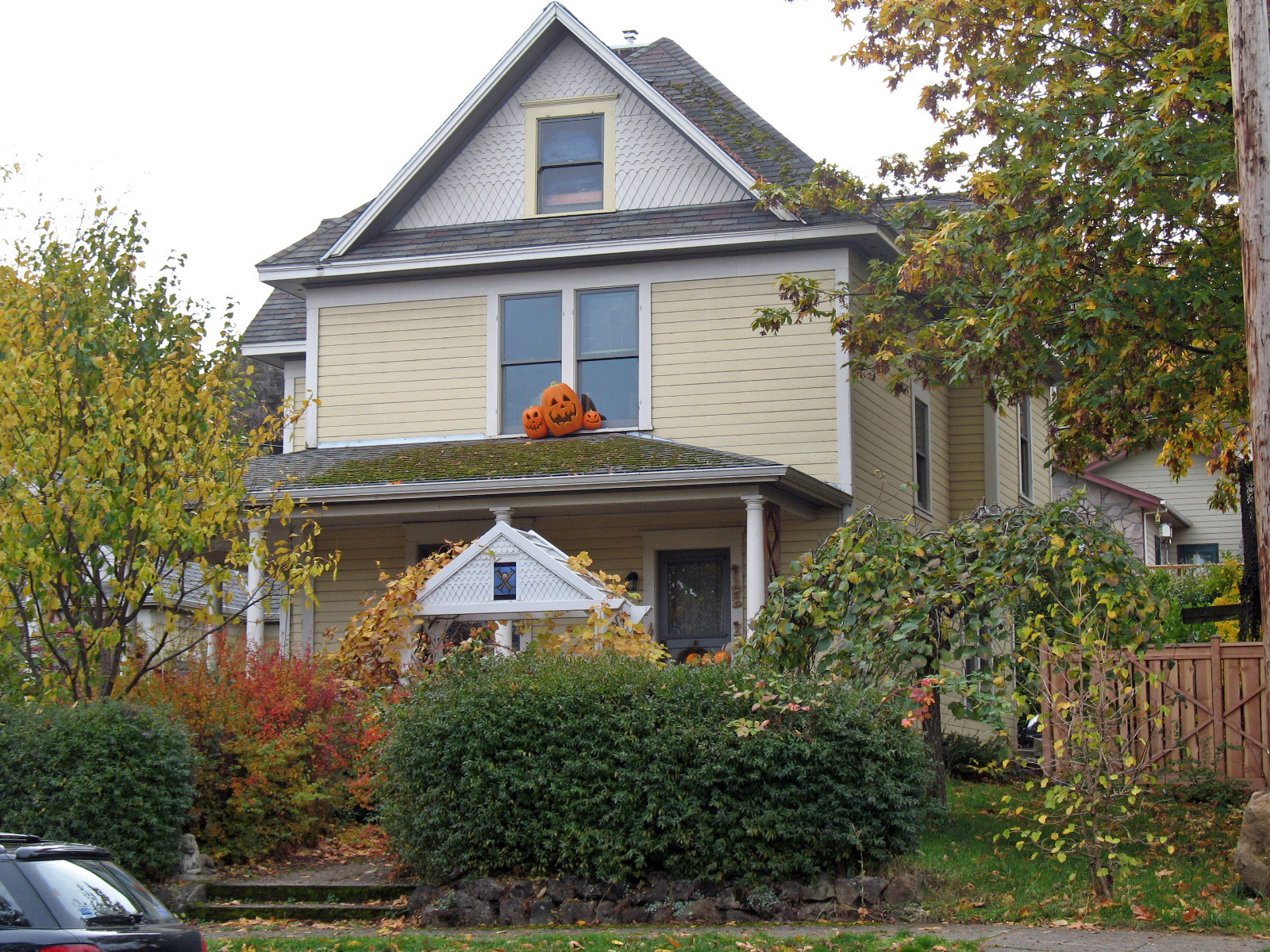
- The Colby House in 2009

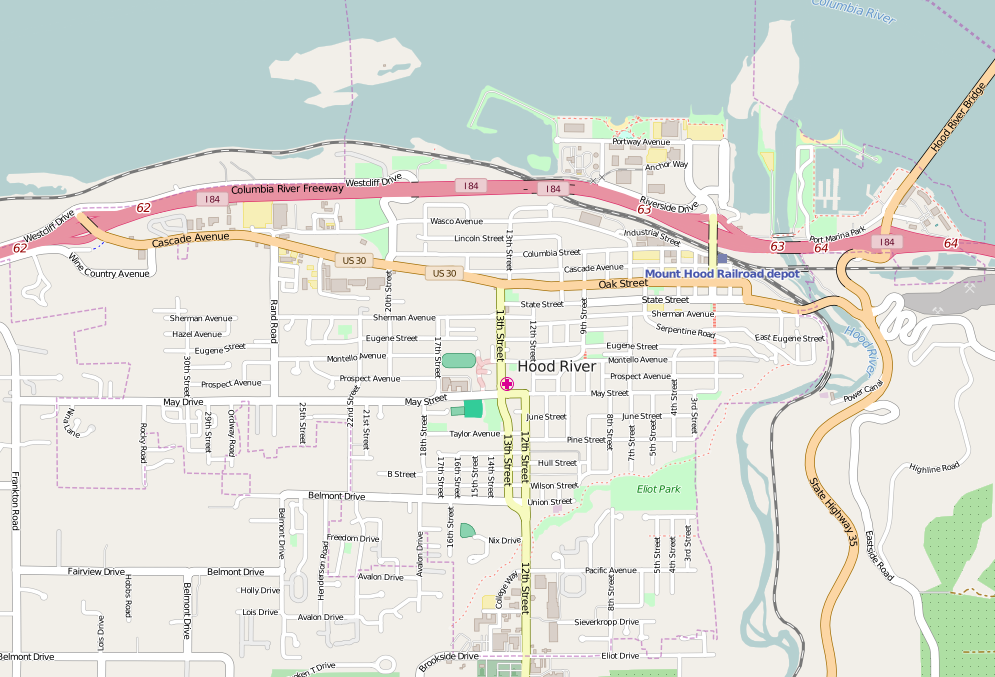
- Location within Hood River OR
- Location: 1219 Columbia Street; Hood River, Oregon
- Coordinates: 45°42′35″N 121°31′28″W
- Area: Lot: 7,950 square feet (739 m^{2})
- Built: ca. 1905
- Architectural style: Queen Anne
- NRHP reference No.: 00000804
- Added to NRHP: July 14, 2000

The Ernest S. and Clara C. Colby House is a historic residence in Hood River, Oregon, United States.

It was listed on the National Register of Historic Places in 2000.

== See also ==
- National Register of Historic Places listings in Hood River County, Oregon
