= Martin and Carrie Hill House =

Historic house in Oregon, United States

- U.S. National Register of Historic Places
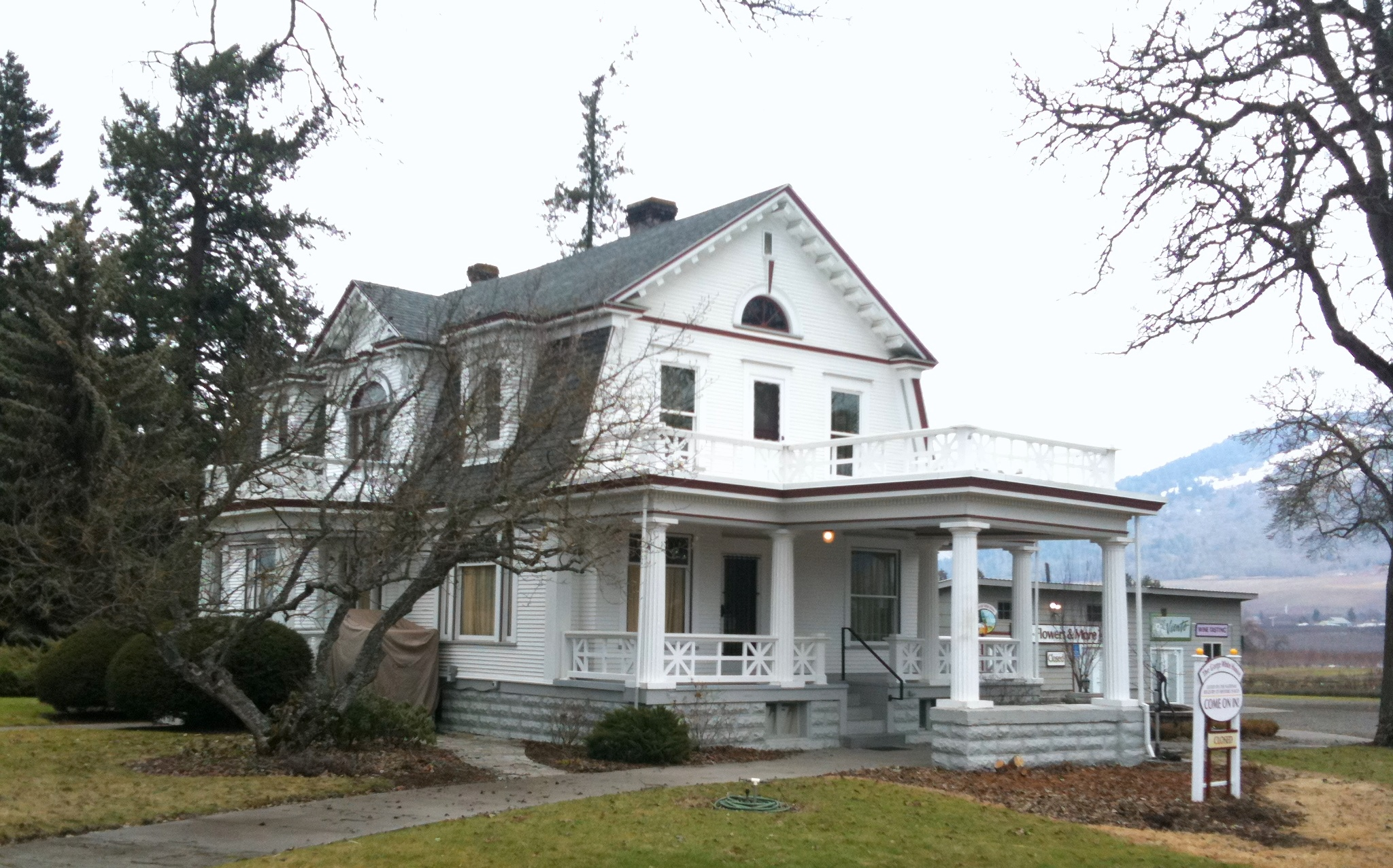
- The Hill House in 2010
- Location: 2265 Highway 35; Hood River, Oregon
- Coordinates: 45°39′28″N 121°30′47″W
- Area: 1 acre (0.40 ha)
- Built: 1910
- Architectural style: Dutch Colonial Revival
- NRHP reference No.: 07000760
- Added to NRHP: July 17, 2007

The Martin and Carrie Hill House, also known as The Gorge White House, is a historic residence located on rural orchard land near Hood River, Oregon, United States. It may be the finest and most ornate example of the Dutch Colonial Revival architectural style in the vicinity of Hood River, incorporating a large array of the distinctive features of the style. Characteristic elements include a gambrel roof, symmetric, rectilinear form, fanlights, dormers, dentils, balconies, window keystones, fluted columns, and others. The house also displays a very high degree of historic integrity on both the exterior and interior, with only minor alterations since its construction in 1910. Martin Hill (1869–1939) and his orchard property surrounding the house were prominent in the development of the apple industry in the Hood River Valley. He was active in business and community affairs, including service as a Hood River County Commissioner and Oregon state legislator. He built this elaborate house in 1910, several years after purchasing his orchard land in 1901, in order to reconcile his wife Carrie (d. 1916) to their relocation from Iowa.

The house was listed on the National Register of Historic Places in 2007. It was opened to the public as an agricultural tourism business that same year.

== See also ==
- National Register of Historic Places listings in Hood River County, Oregon
