= Simpson Copple House =

Historic house in Oregon, United States

- U.S. National Register of Historic Places
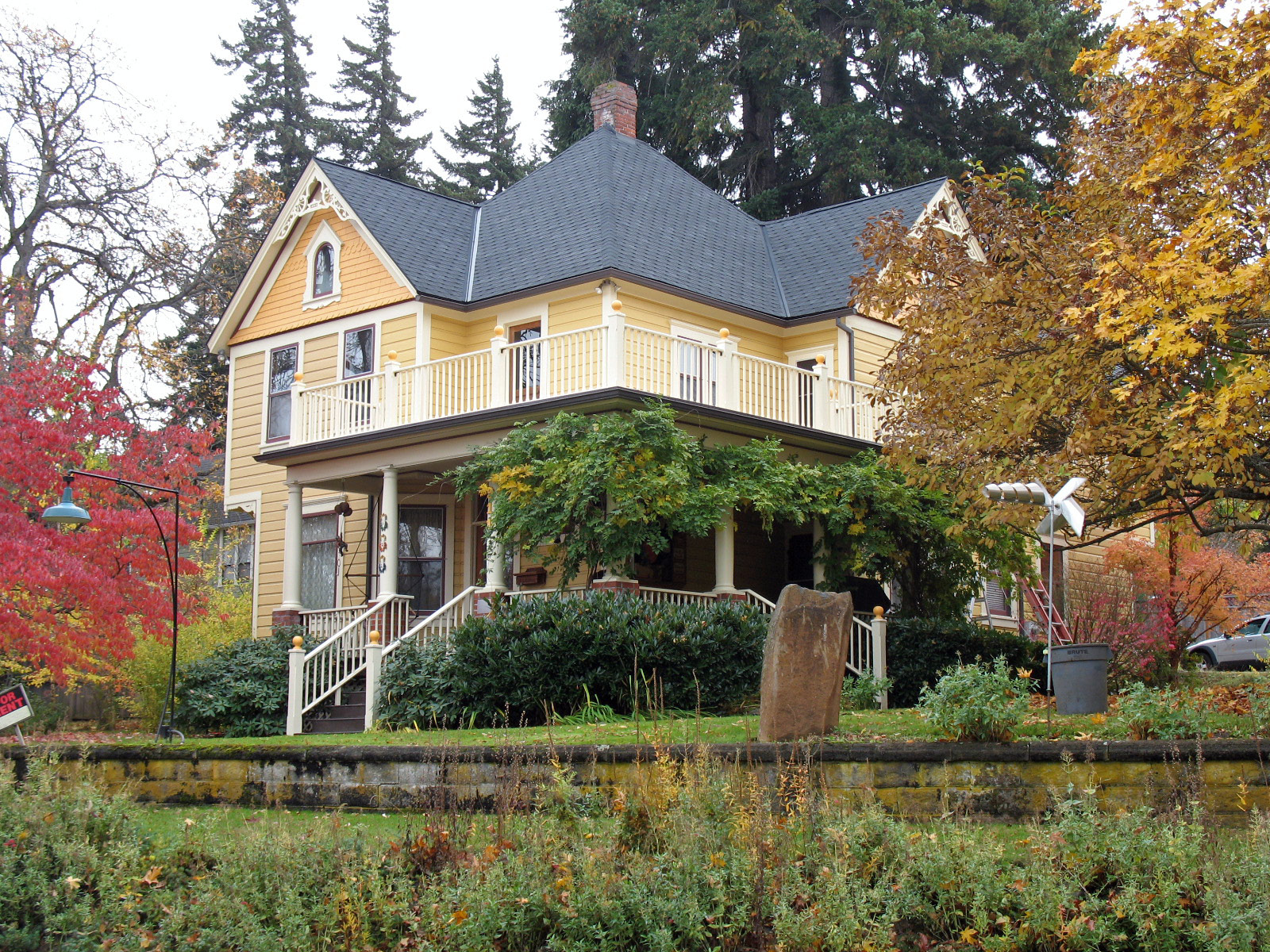
- The Copple House in 2009

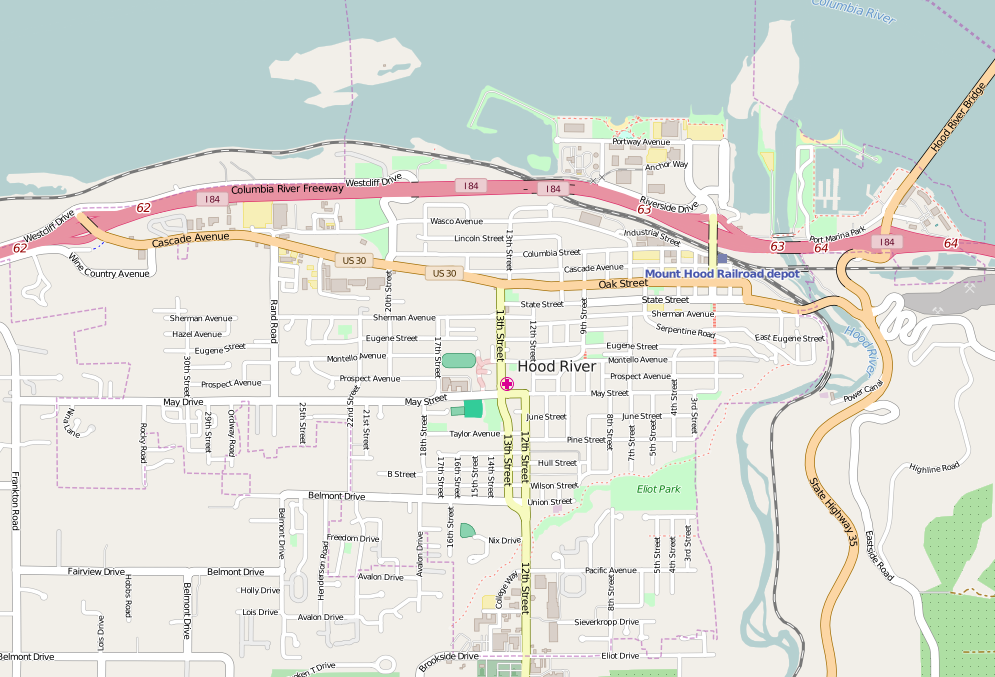
- Location within Hood River OR
- Location: 911 Montello Avenue; Hood River, Oregon
- Coordinates: 45°42′19″N 121°31′14″W
- Area: Less than 1 acre (0.40 ha)
- Built: 1906
- Architectural style: Vernacular Queen Anne, with a Colonial Revival porch
- NRHP reference No.: 87000362
- Added to NRHP: March 6, 1987

The Simpson Copple House is a historic residence in Hood River, Oregon, United States. Built in 1906 on a rise overlooking the Columbia River, it is one of the best preserved examples of the vernacular, late Queen Anne architectural style in Hood River. Its size, state of preservation, and fine detail work on its gables especially stand out from similar houses in the area. Simpson Copple (1842–1933) was a Civil War veteran and pioneer orchardist who was important in the growth of the apple industry in the Hood River Valley. He purchased the house shortly after its construction and lived there until his death.

The house was listed on the National Register of Historic Places in 1987.

== See also ==
- National Register of Historic Places listings in Hood River County, Oregon
