= Edward J. DeHart House =

Historic house in Oregon, United States

- U.S. National Register of Historic Places
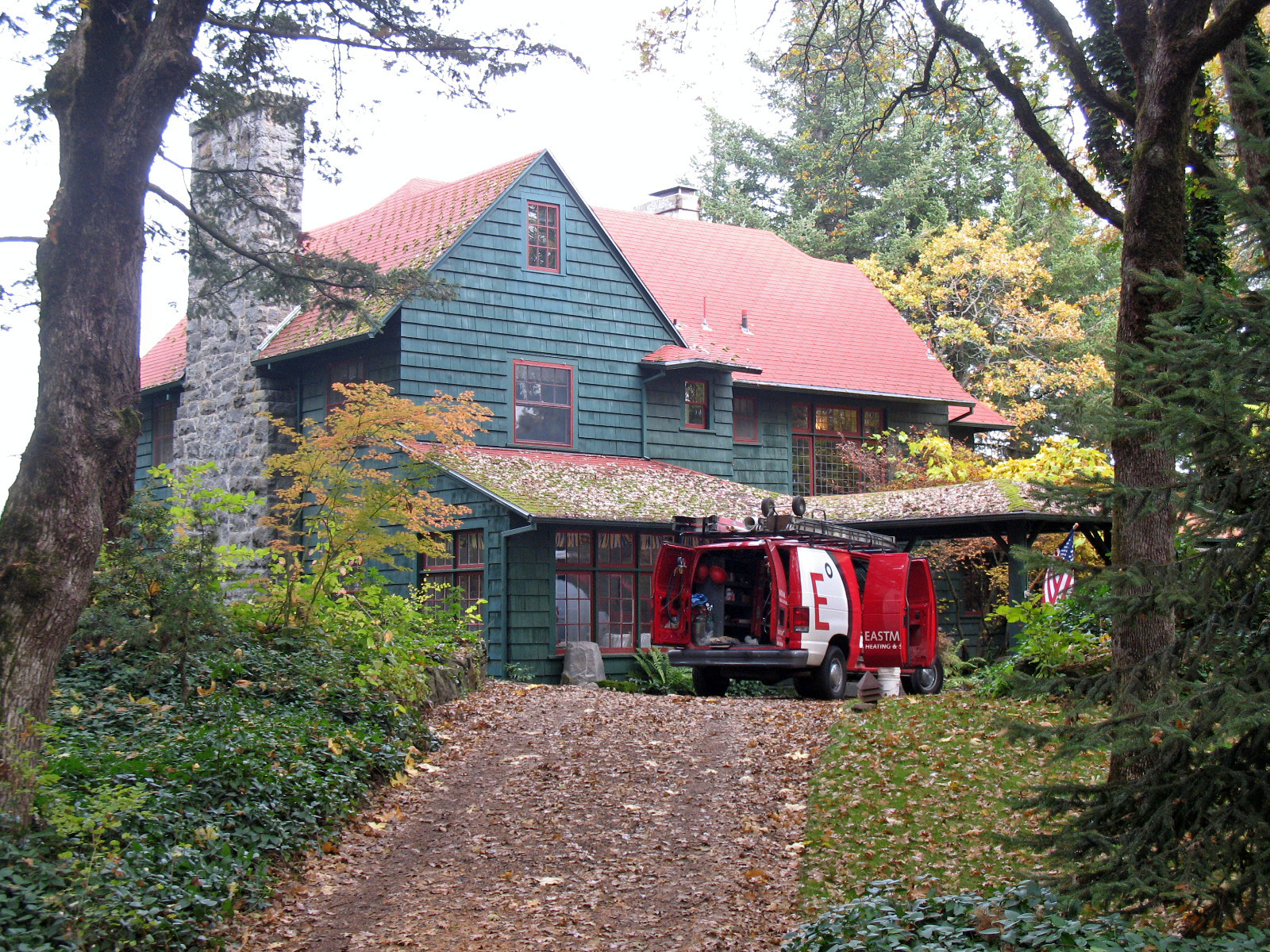
- The DeHart House in 2009

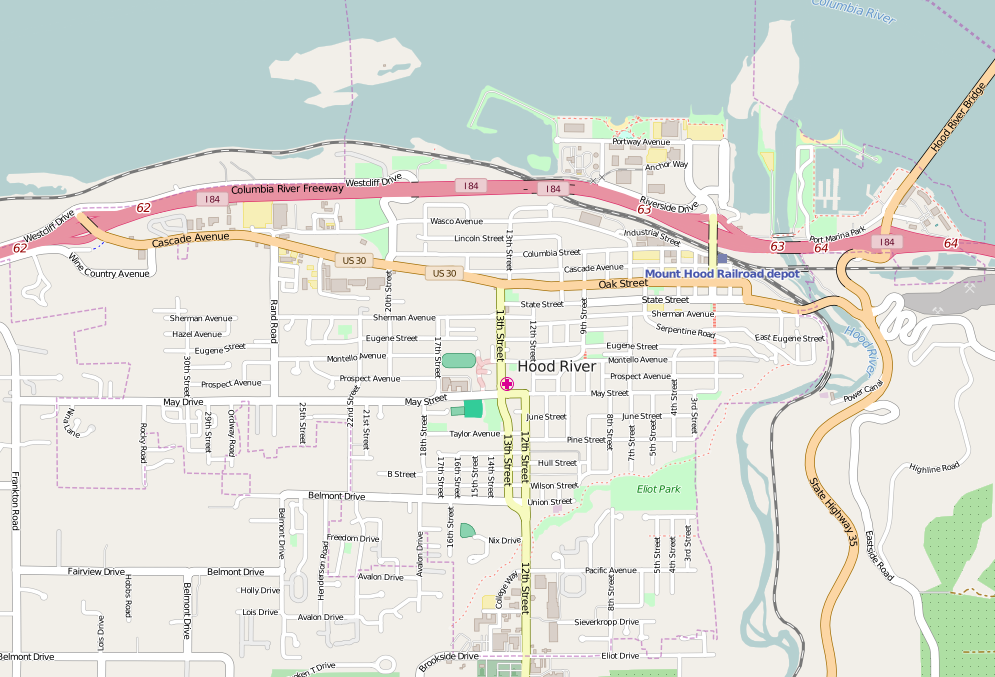
- Location within Hood River OR
- Location: 3820 Westcliff Drive; Hood River, Oregon
- Coordinates: 45°42′47″N 121°32′50″W
- Area: 3.5 acres (1.4 ha)
- Built: 1907–1908
- Built by: Albert Krieg
- Architect: A. E. Doyle
- Architectural style: Shingle style
- NRHP reference No.: 90000276
- Added to NRHP: February 23, 1990

The Edward J. DeHart House, also referred to as Lakecliff, is a historic residence located in Hood River, Oregon, United States.

The house was listed on the National Register of Historic Places in 1990.

== See also ==
- National Register of Historic Places listings in Hood River County, Oregon
