= Davidson–Childs House =

Historic house in Oregon, United States

- U.S. National Register of Historic Places
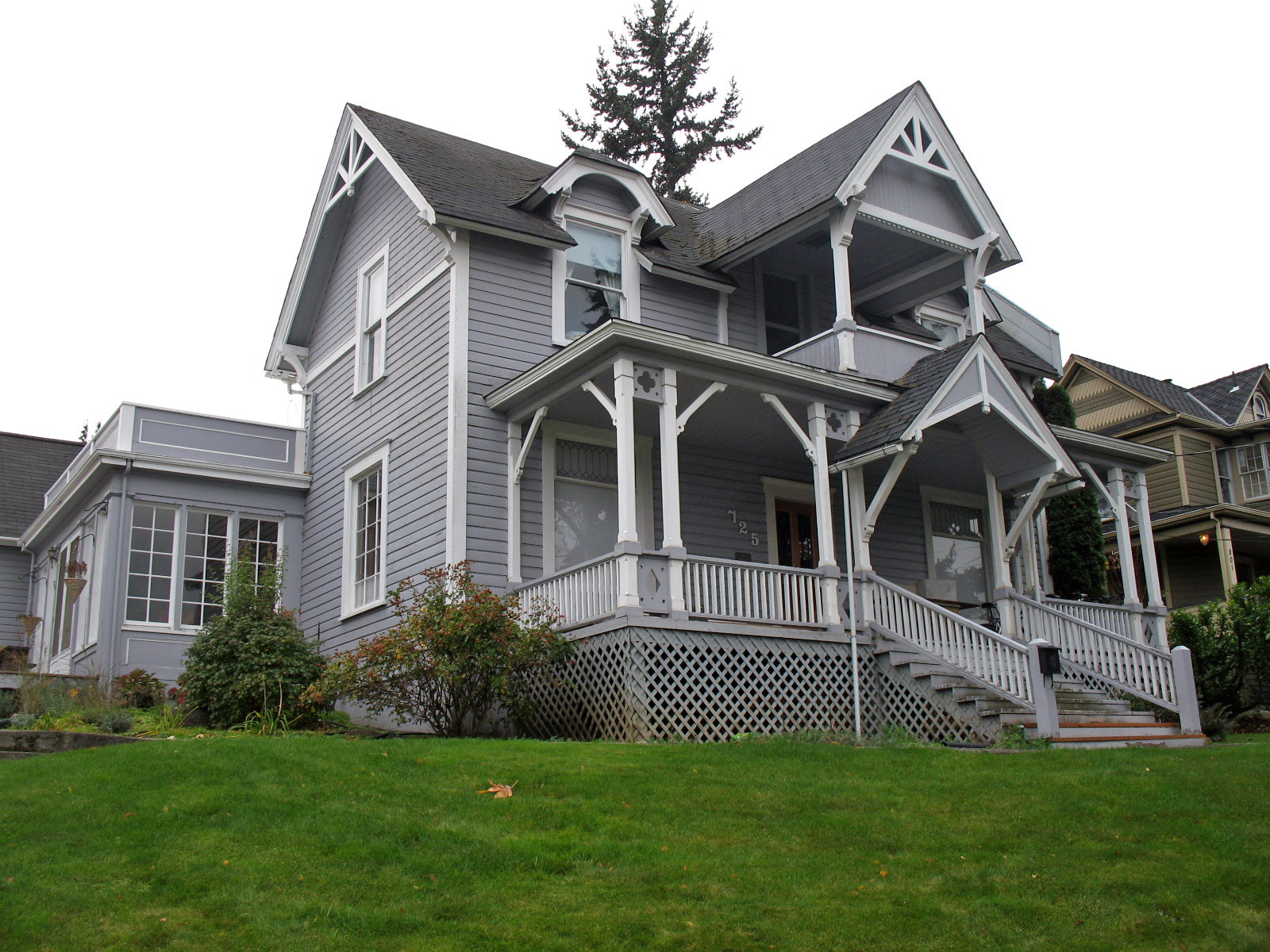
- The Davidson–Childs House in 2009
- Location: 725 Oak Street; Hood River, Oregon
- Coordinates: 45°42′31″N 121°31′07″W
- Area: Less than 1 acre (0.40 ha)
- Built: ca. 1904
- Built by: Payton Davidson
- Architectural style: Stick
- NRHP reference No.: 89001864
- Added to NRHP: October 30, 1989

The Davidson–Childs House is a historic residence in Hood River, Oregon, United States.

The house was listed on the National Register of Historic Places in 1989.

== See also ==
- National Register of Historic Places listings in Hood River County, Oregon
