= Cliff Lodge =

Historic house in Oregon, United States

- U.S. National Register of Historic Places
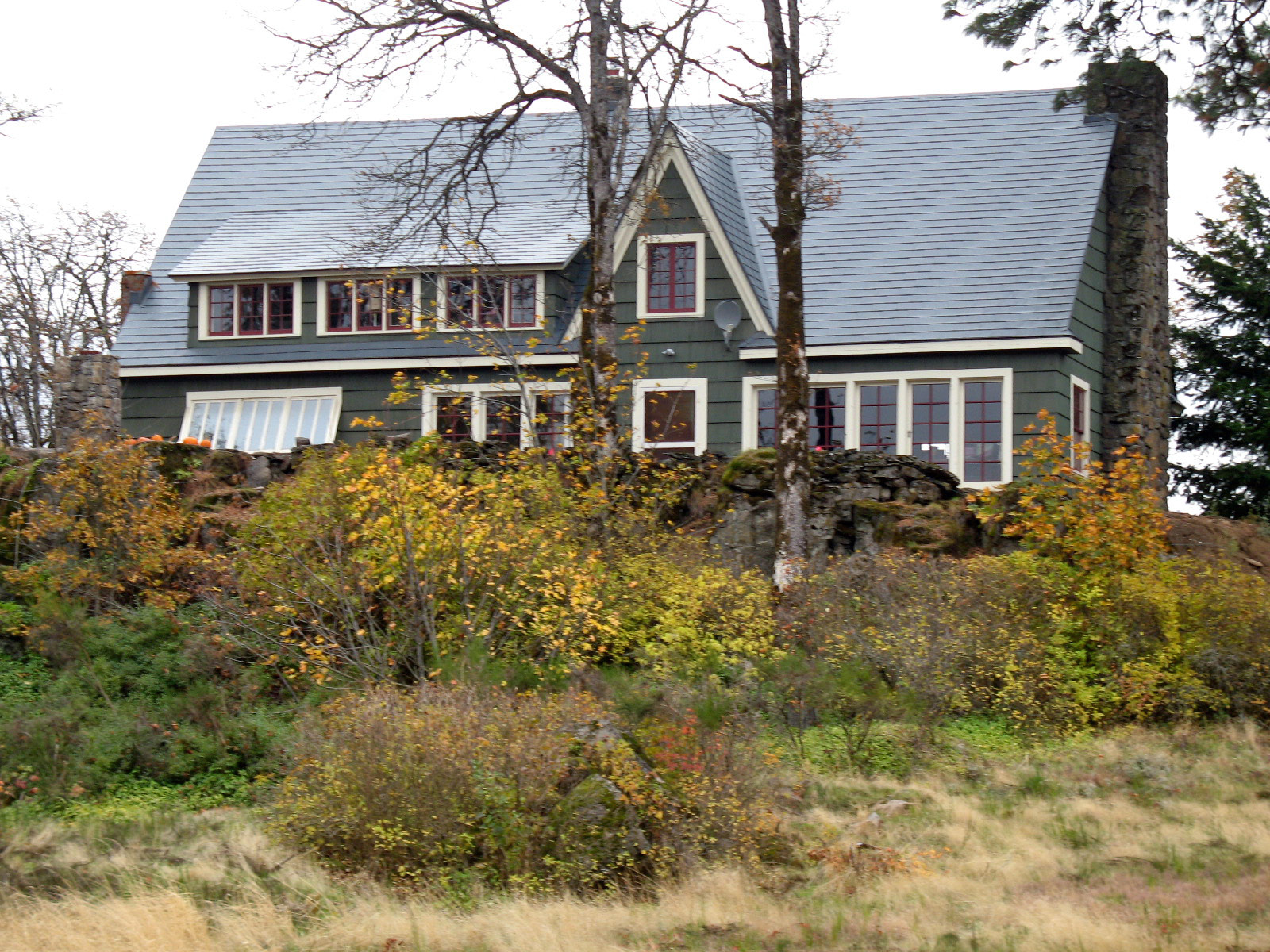
- Cliff Lodge in 2009

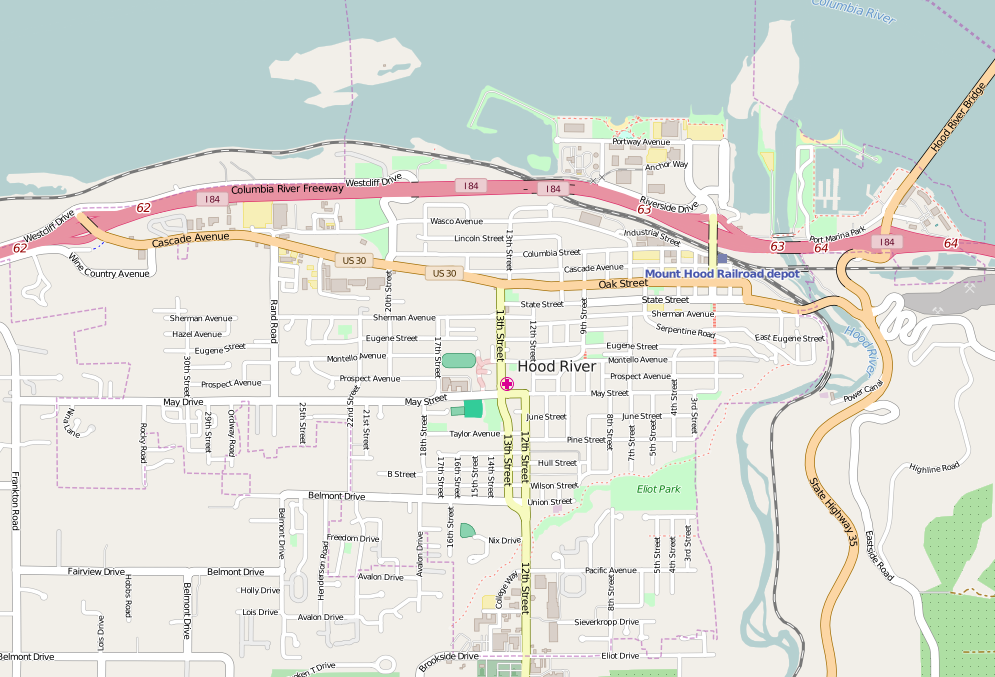
- Location within Hood River OR
- Location: 3345 Cascade Avenue; Hood River, Oregon
- Coordinates: 45°42′36″N 121°32′43″W
- Area: 2 acres (0.81 ha)
- Built: 1928
- Built by: George Stranahan
- Architectural style: Vernacular / Rustic Arts and Crafts
- NRHP reference No.: 00000445
- Added to NRHP: May 5, 2000

Cliff Lodge is a historic house located in Hood River, Oregon, United States.

The house was listed on the National Register of Historic Places in 2000.

== See also ==
- National Register of Historic Places listings in Hood River County, Oregon
