= George M. Post =

American architect

George Morrison Post (November 21, 1883 – January 21, 1966) was an American architect from Oregon. He worked primarily in Salem and Portland. A few of Post's works are listed on the National Register of Historic Places (NRHP).

== Life and career ==
Post was born on November 21, 1883, to Owen L. Post, a carriage maker, and Mary W. Post (née Palmer) in New London, Connecticut. Without any formal training, Post went to work for a local architect. By 1905 he was working for the local firm of Donnelly & Hazeltine. In 1907, he started a solo practice in Pittsburgh, Pennsylvania. He moved to Salem, Oregon in 1908 and worked with Louis R. Hazeltine, his former employer, until 1910, when Post again practiced alone. In 1912, he designed the Salem Carnegie library, which serves today as Willamette University's Oregon Civic Justice Center. In 1917, Post moved to Portland, joining Morris H. Whitehouse's firm. When the State of Oregon began licensing architects in 1919, the Oregon Board of Architect Examiners issued him license No. 1 under a grandfather clause. Post served as the board's secretary until 1926. He left the Whitehouse firm in 1923.

Post died on January 21, 1966, in Portland, aged 82, leaving a wife, Eliza, and a daughter.

== Works ==
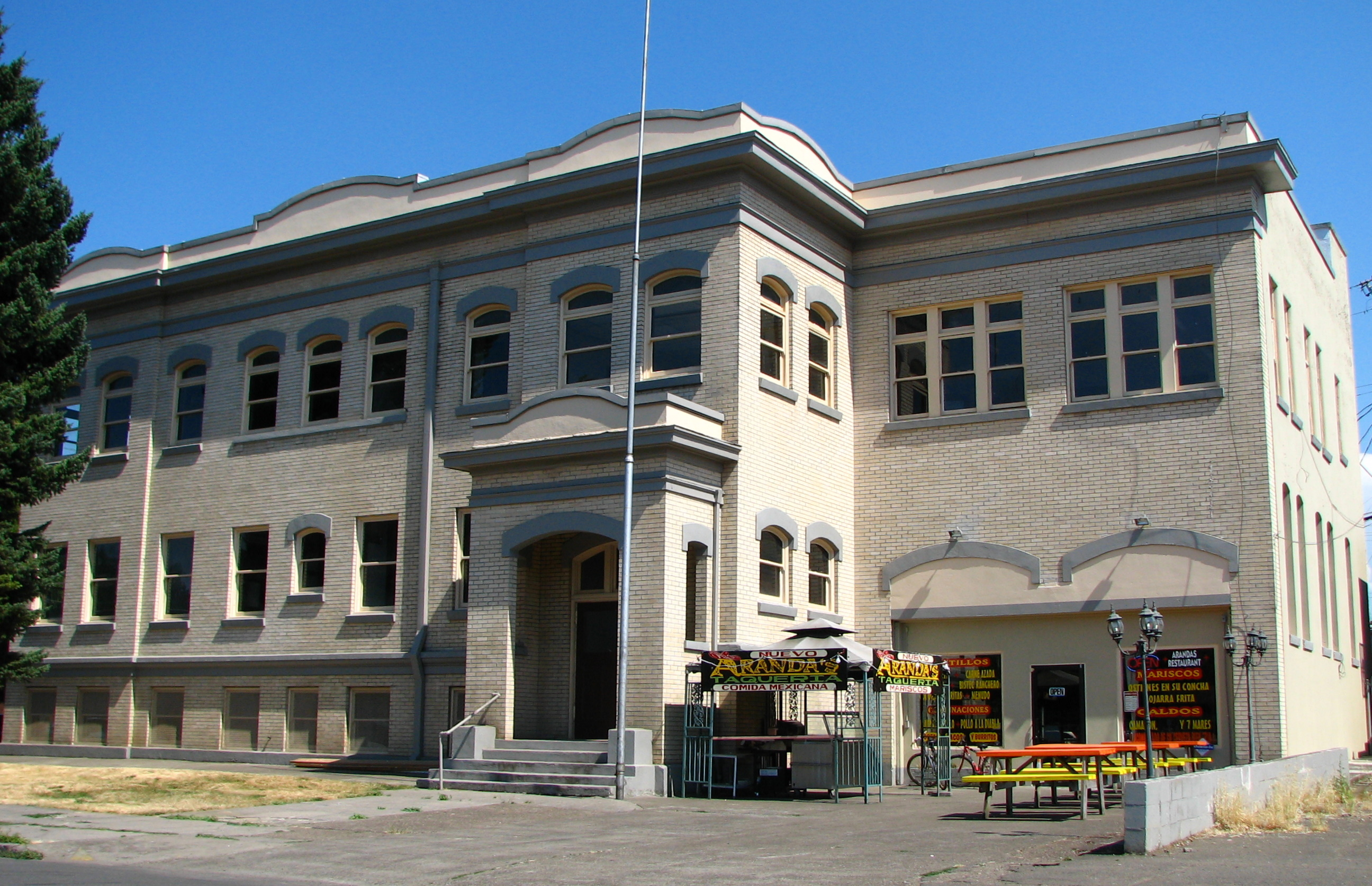
Old Woodburn City Hall

- Salem, Oregon Carnegie library (1912)
- The Majestic Theatre, Corvallis (1913)
- Old Woodburn City Hall, Woodburn (1914), NRHP
- The Derby Building, Salem (c. 1915), remodeled into the Senator Hotel (demolished in 1997, currently the site of Courthouse Square)
- McKinley Elementary School, Salem, Oregon (1915)
- Moore Building, Salem (1916), a contributing property of the Salem Downtown State Street – Commercial Street Historic District (NRHP)
- Morado Apartments, Portland (1925), a contributing property of the Alphabet Historic District (NRHP)
- Mount Hood Hotel Annex, Hood River (completed 1912, renovation by Post, 1926), NRHP
- William T. and Helen Werner House, Portland (1928)
- Eugene Walsh House, Portland (1929)
- Multi-family apartment, Portland (1930), a contributing property of the Irvington Historic District (NRHP)
- W. S. and Gladys Boutwell House, Lake Oswego (1931), NRHP
- Spokane, Portland & Seattle Railway Roundhouse, Portland (c. 1941), demolished
- Yard Master's Quarters, Portland (1944)
