= Hood River County Library and Georgiana Smith Park =

- U.S. National Register of Historic Places
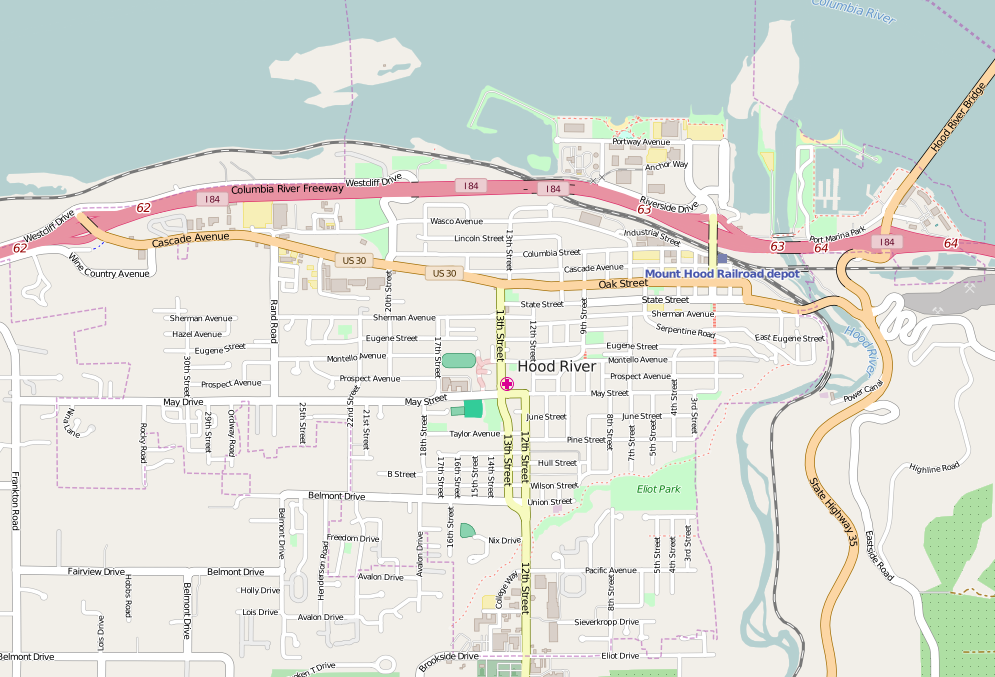
- Location within Hood River OR
- Location: 502 State St., Hood River, Oregon
- Coordinates: 45°42′32″N 121°30′52″W
- Area: 0.7 acres (0.28 ha)
- Built: 1913–14
- Architect: Sutton and Whitney, L.A. Woodward
- Architectural style: Jacobethan
- NRHP reference No.: 98000605
- Added to NRHP: May 29, 1998

The Hood River County Library and Georgiana Smith Park was listed on the National Register of Historic Places in 1998.

It was a community effort to get the library built, with a woman's club leading, and eventually securing a $17,500 Carnegie grant. The library was built in 1913–14. The Georgiana Smith Park was completed in 1935.
