= Parkdale, Oregon =

Unincorporated community in the state of Oregon, United States

- Census-designated place (CDP)
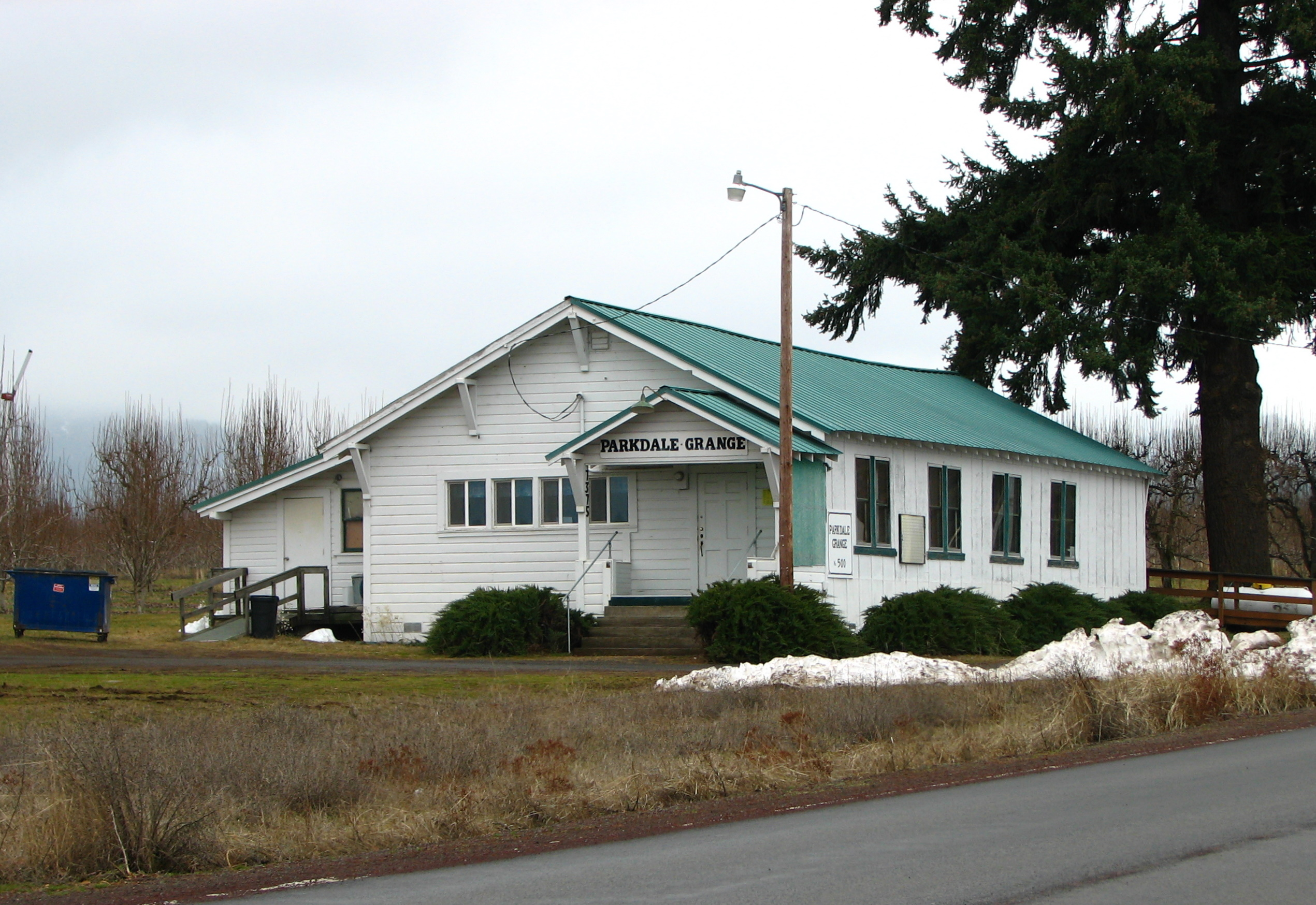
- Parkdale grange hall

- Location of Parkdale, Oregon
- Coordinates: 45°30′47″N 121°35′31″W
- Country: United States
- State: Oregon
- County: Hood River

Area
  - Total: 0.63 sq mi (1.62 km^{2})
  - Land: 0.63 sq mi (1.62 km^{2})
  - Water: 0 sq mi (0.00 km^{2})
- Elevation: 1,788 ft (545 m)

Population (2020)
  - Total: 299
  - Density: 478/sq mi (184.4/km^{2})
- Time zone: UTC-8 (Pacific (PST))
  - Summer (DST): UTC-7 (PDT)
- ZIP code: 97041
- Area codes: 458 and 541
- FIPS code: 41-56500
- GNIS feature ID: 2409028

Parkdale is an unincorporated community and census-designated place (CDP) in Hood River County, Oregon, United States. As of the 2020 census, Parkdale had a population of 299.

== History ==
Parkdale was founded by David Eccles and R. J. McIsaac in 1910 to serve as a terminus for the Mount Hood Railroad.

== Geography ==
Parkdale is located in central Hood River County in the Upper Hood River Valley. It is 2 miles (3 km) southwest of the neighboring community of Mount Hood and 16 miles (26 km) south of Hood River, the county seat. Oregon Route 281 is the main road through the community.

According to the United States Census Bureau, the Parkdale CDP has a total area of 0.62 square miles (1.6 km^{2}), all of it land.

== Climate ==
This region experiences warm (but not hot) and dry summers, with no average monthly temperatures above 71.6 °F. According to the Köppen Climate Classification system, Parkdale has a warm-summer Mediterranean climate, abbreviated "Csb" on climate maps.

Climate data for Parkdale
Month	Jan	Feb	Mar	Apr	May	Jun	Jul	Aug	Sep	Oct	Nov	Dec	Year
Record high °F (°C)	65 (18)	66 (19)	77 (25)	83 (28)	97 (36)	99 (37)	110 (43)	101 (38)	96 (36)	87 (31)	69 (21)	62 (17)	110 (43)
Mean maximum °F (°C)	56 (13)	58 (14)	67 (19)	75 (24)	84 (29)	89 (32)	95 (35)	94 (34)	89 (32)	77 (25)	62 (17)	54 (12)	97 (36)
Mean daily maximum °F (°C)	40.6 (4.8)	45.0 (7.2)	51.6 (10.9)	57.8 (14.3)	65.2 (18.4)	71.7 (22.1)	80.5 (26.9)	80.1 (26.7)	73.8 (23.2)	61 (16)	46.8 (8.2)	39 (4)	59.4 (15.2)
Daily mean °F (°C)	33.9 (1.1)	36.6 (2.6)	41.6 (5.3)	46.5 (8.1)	53.1 (11.7)	58.5 (14.7)	64.8 (18.2)	64.4 (18.0)	58.6 (14.8)	48.7 (9.3)	39.1 (3.9)	33.2 (0.7)	48.3 (9.0)
Mean daily minimum °F (°C)	27.3 (−2.6)	28.2 (−2.1)	31.5 (−0.3)	35.2 (1.8)	40.9 (4.9)	45.2 (7.3)	49.0 (9.4)	48.5 (9.2)	43.4 (6.3)	36.4 (2.4)	31.3 (−0.4)	27.3 (−2.6)	37.0 (2.8)
Mean minimum °F (°C)	13 (−11)	14 (−10)	21 (−6)	25 (−4)	29 (−2)	34 (1)	39 (4)	38 (3)	31 (−1)	23 (−5)	19 (−7)	12 (−11)	5 (−15)
Record low °F (°C)	−10 (−23)	−13 (−25)	10 (−12)	21 (−6)	24 (−4)	28 (−2)	34 (1)	34 (1)	15 (−9)	10 (−12)	−10 (−23)	−13 (−25)	−13 (−25)
Average precipitation inches (mm)	5.63 (143)	3.97 (101)	3.60 (91)	2.28 (58)	1.66 (42)	1.07 (27)	0.31 (7.9)	0.39 (9.9)	1.06 (27)	3.17 (81)	6.00 (152)	6.86 (174)	36 (913.8)
Average snowfall inches (cm)	16.6 (42)	9.1 (23)	4.1 (10)	1.0 (2.5)	0 (0)	0 (0)	0 (0)	0 (0)	0 (0)	0.2 (0.51)	5.7 (14)	18.2 (46)	54.2 (138)
Average precipitation days	16.2	12.3	14.1	13.3	9.8	6.6	2.1	2.5	4.1	11.0	17.6	16.7	126.3
Average snowy days (≥ 0.1 in)	6.1	4.0	2.3	0.5	0.0	0.0	0.0	0.0	0.0	0.2	2.8	7.7	23.6

== Geology ==
The geology of Parkdale is dominated by the geology of Mount Hood, a nearby stratovolcano about 10 miles (16 km) to the south of the town. A 6,000-year-old lava flow is named after the town. It flowed north from the Upper Hood River Valley.

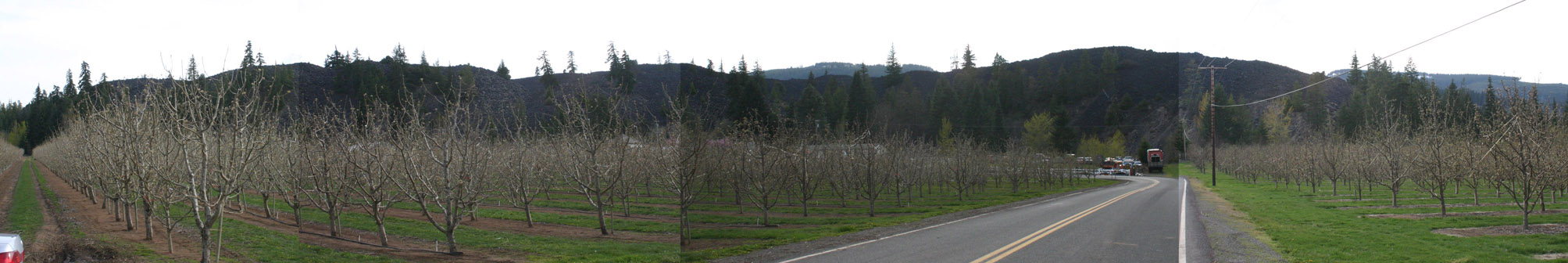
Panoramic view of the northern terminus of the Parkdale Lava flow from Lavabed Road, facing west to southwest

== Demographics ==
Historical population
Census	Pop.	Note	%±
2020	299		—
U.S. Decennial Census

As of the census of 2000, there were 266 people, 88 households, and 68 families residing in the CDP. The population density was 419.1 inhabitants per square mile (161.8/km^{2}). There were 92 housing units at an average density of 145.0 per square mile (56.0/km^{2}). The racial makeup of the CDP is 80.08% White, 4.51% Native American, 0.75% Asian, 11.65% from other races, and 3.01% from two or more races. Hispanic or Latino of any race were 23.31% of the population.

There were 88 households, out of which 43.2% had children under the age of 18 living with them, 58.0% were married couples living together, 10.2% had a female householder with no husband present, and 22.7% were non-families. 15.9% of all households were made up of individuals, and 4.5% had someone living alone who was 65 years of age or older. The average household size was 2.95 and the average family size was 3.21.

In the CDP, the population was spread out, with 30.5% under the age of 18, 10.2% from 18 to 24, 26.7% from 25 to 44, 21.8% from 45 to 64, and 10.9% who were 65 years of age or older. The median age was 34 years. For every 100 females, there were 133.3 males. For every 100 females age 18 and over, there were 122.9 males.

The median income for a household in the CDP was $31,786, and the median income for a family was $34,375. Males had a median income of $52,679 versus $30,313 for females. The per capita income for the CDP was $18,091. About 8.0% of families and 19.7% of the population were below the poverty line, including 33.3% of those under the age of eighteen and none of those 65 or over.

== See also ==
- Mount Hood Parkdale, Oregon
