= Bonne Femme =

Bonne Femme may refer to:

- Bonne Femme Creek (disambiguation)
- Bonne Femme Township, Howard County, Missouri, an inactive township

== See also ==
- Les Bonnes Femmes, a 1960 French comedic drama film directed by Claude Chabrol
