= Crescent Glacier (Mount Adams) =

Mountain glacier in Washington, United States

- Location within Washington (state) Location within the United States
- Type: Mountain glacier
- Location: Mount Adams, Yakima County, Washington, USA
- Coordinates: 46°10′01″N 121°29′14″W
- Area: 0.44 km^{2} (0.17 sq mi) in 2006
- Length: 0.25 mi (0.40 km)
- Terminus: Talus
- Status: Retreating

Crescent Glacier is located on the southeast slopes of Mount Adams in the U.S. state of Washington in Gifford Pinchot National Forest. A small subpeak of Mount Adams, named South Butte, rises nearby. Crescent Glacier is close to the Gotchen Glacier which is located just to the east. Crescent Glacier lies in a small south-facing cirque with a steep headwall. The glacier ranges in elevation from 8,400 ft (2,600 m) at the foot of the steep cliff to 7,900 ft (2,400 m) at the moraine. One arm of the glacier extends south down to 7,600 ft (2,300 m). Between 1904 and 2006, Crescent Glacier lost 6 percent of its surface area.

== See also ==
- List of glaciers in the United States
