= Salt Fork =

Salt Fork may refer to:

- Salt Fork (Bonne Femme Creek tributary), a stream in Missouri
- Salt Fork Arkansas River in Kansas and Oklahoma
- Salt Fork Brazos River in Texas
- Salt Fork Red River in Texas and Oklahoma
- Salt Fork Vermilion River in Illinois
- Salt Fork State Park in Ohio
