= Mazama Glacier =

Mazama Glacier may refer to:

- Mazama Glacier (Mount Adams), U.S. state of Washington
- Mazama Glacier (Mount Baker), U.S. state of Washington
