= Bonne Femme Creek =

Bonne Femme Creek may refer to:

- Bonne Femme Creek (Boone County, Missouri), a tributary of the Missouri River in Missouri
- Bonne Femme Creek (Howard County, Missouri), a tributary of the Missouri River in Missouri
