= Sugar Tree Branch =

Stream in the US state of Missouri

Coordinates: 39°14′13″N 92°38′04″W

Location
- Country: United States
- State: Missouri
- County: Howard

Physical characteristics
- Mouth: Bonne Femme Creek

Sugar Tree Branch is a stream in Howard County in the U.S. state of Missouri. It is a tributary of Bonne Femme Creek.

Sugar Tree Branch most likely was so named on account of sugar maple trees along its course.

== See also ==
- List of rivers of Missouri
