= Bonne Femme Creek (Howard County, Missouri) =

Stream in the U.S. state of Missouri

Bonne Femme Creek (/bɒnˈfæm/ bon-FAM) is a stream in Howard and Randolph counties in the U.S. state of Missouri. It is a tributary of the Missouri River.

The stream headwaters arise in Randolph County approximately two miles west of Higbee just southwest of the intersection of routes B and H at 39°18′11″N 92°32′35″W at an elevation of about 850 feet. The stream flows to the southwest entering Howard County and flows past the east side of Fayette and on past New Franklin where it enters the Missouri River floodplain. It flows to the southeast passing under U.S. Route 40 and on to its confluence with the Missouri approximately two miles east of Booneville. The confluence is at 38°58′41″N 92°39′57″W and an elevation of 574 feet.

Bonne Femme Creek is a French name signifying "good woman". The English and French names for the stream probably are accurate preservations of the Omaha language word for "good woman", i.e. the wife of their Indian religious leader.

Sugar Tree Branch, Salt Fork, Adams Fork, among others, flow into this creek.

== See also ==
- List of rivers of Missouri
