= Lava Glacier =

Glacier in Washington, United States

- Location within Washington (state) Location within the United States
- Type: Mountain glacier
- Location: Mount Adams, Yakima County, Washington, USA
- Coordinates: 46°13′40″N 121°29′34″W
- Area: 0.67 km^{2} (0.26 sq mi) in 2006
- Length: 0.75 mi (1.21 km)
- Terminus: Talus
- Status: Retreating

Lava Glacier is located on the north slopes of Mount Adams a stratovolcano in Gifford Pinchot National Forest in the U.S. state of Washington. The glacier descends from approximately 10,000 ft (3,000 m) to a terminus near 7,800 ft (2,400 m). Lava Glacier has been in a general state of retreat for over 100 years and lost 74 percent of its surface area between 1904 and 2006.

Lava Glacier was named by Harry Fielding Reid during his survey of Mount Adams' glaciers with C. E. Rusk in 1901.

== See also ==
- List of glaciers in the United States
