= Pinnacle Glacier (Mount Adams) =

Glacier in Washington, United States

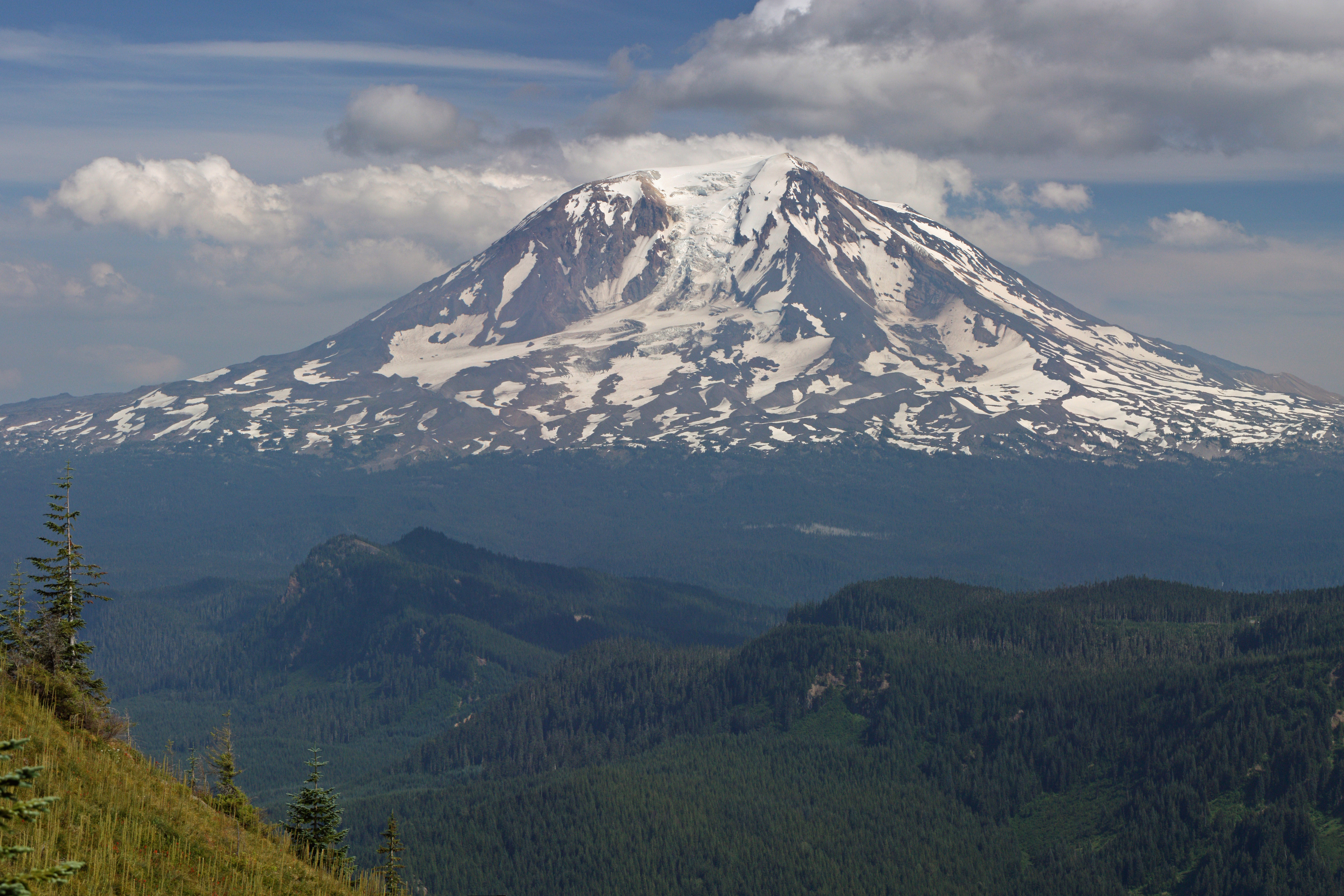
- Pinnacle Glacier in the large cirque on the right side of the mountain.

- Location within Washington (state) Location within the United States
- Type: Mountain glacier
- Location: Mount Adams, Yakima and Skamania Counties, Washington, USA
- Coordinates: 46°12′25″N 121°31′43″W
- Area: 1.41 km^{2} (0.54 sq mi) in 2006
- Length: 1.2 mi (1.9 km)
- Terminus: Talus
- Status: Retreating

Pinnacle Glacier is located on the west slopes of Mount Adams a stratovolcano in Gifford Pinchot National Forest in the U.S. state of Washington. The glacier descends from approximately 10,000 ft (3,000 m) to a terminus near 7,200 ft (2,200 m). Pinnacle Glacier lost 7 percent of its surface area between 1904 and 2006.

Pinnacle Glacier was named by Harry Fielding Reid during his survey of Mount Adams' glaciers with C. E. Rusk in 1901.

== See also ==
- List of glaciers in the United States
