= Klickitat Glacier =

Glacier in Washington, United States

- Location within Washington (state) Location within the United States
- Type: Mountain glacier
- Location: Mount Adams, Yakima County, Washington, USA
- Coordinates: 46°11′21″N 121°27′58″W
- Area: 2.93 km^{2} (1.13 sq mi) in 2006
- Length: 2 mi (3.2 km)
- Terminus: Talus
- Status: Retreating

Klickitat Glacier is located on the east slopes of Mount Adams a stratovolcano in the U.S. state of Washington. Though within the Mount Adams Wilderness, the glacier is situated within the boundaries of the Yakama Indian Reservation. The glacier descends from approximately 12,000 ft (3,700 m) to a terminus near 7,200 ft (2,200 m) below which an old lateral moraine once was the northern margin of the glacier. Klickitat Glacier has been in a general state of retreat for over 100 years and lost 46 percent of its surface area between 1904 and 2006.

== Climate ==
Piker's Peak is on the upper boundary of Klickitat Glacier.

Climate data for Piker's Peak 46.1950 N, 121.4872 W, Elevation: 11,188 ft (3,410 m) (1991–2020 normals)
Month	Jan	Feb	Mar	Apr	May	Jun	Jul	Aug	Sep	Oct	Nov	Dec	Year
Mean daily maximum °F (°C)	19.9 (−6.7)	19.2 (−7.1)	20.4 (−6.4)	24.2 (−4.3)	33.1 (0.6)	40.2 (4.6)	50.9 (10.5)	51.2 (10.7)	45.9 (7.7)	35.4 (1.9)	23.4 (−4.8)	18.8 (−7.3)	31.9 (−0.1)
Daily mean °F (°C)	13.9 (−10.1)	11.9 (−11.2)	12.0 (−11.1)	14.7 (−9.6)	22.4 (−5.3)	28.8 (−1.8)	37.9 (3.3)	38.3 (3.5)	33.7 (0.9)	25.5 (−3.6)	17.0 (−8.3)	13.1 (−10.5)	22.4 (−5.3)
Mean daily minimum °F (°C)	7.9 (−13.4)	4.6 (−15.2)	3.7 (−15.7)	5.2 (−14.9)	11.8 (−11.2)	17.4 (−8.1)	24.9 (−3.9)	25.3 (−3.7)	21.5 (−5.8)	15.5 (−9.2)	10.7 (−11.8)	7.3 (−13.7)	13.0 (−10.5)
Average precipitation inches (mm)	13.22 (336)	10.04 (255)	10.27 (261)	6.95 (177)	4.59 (117)	3.20 (81)	0.89 (23)	1.26 (32)	2.96 (75)	7.46 (189)	12.98 (330)	14.23 (361)	88.05 (2,237)
Source: PRISM Climate Group

== See also ==
- List of glaciers in the United States
