= Mazama Glacier (Mount Adams) =

Glacier in the state of Washington

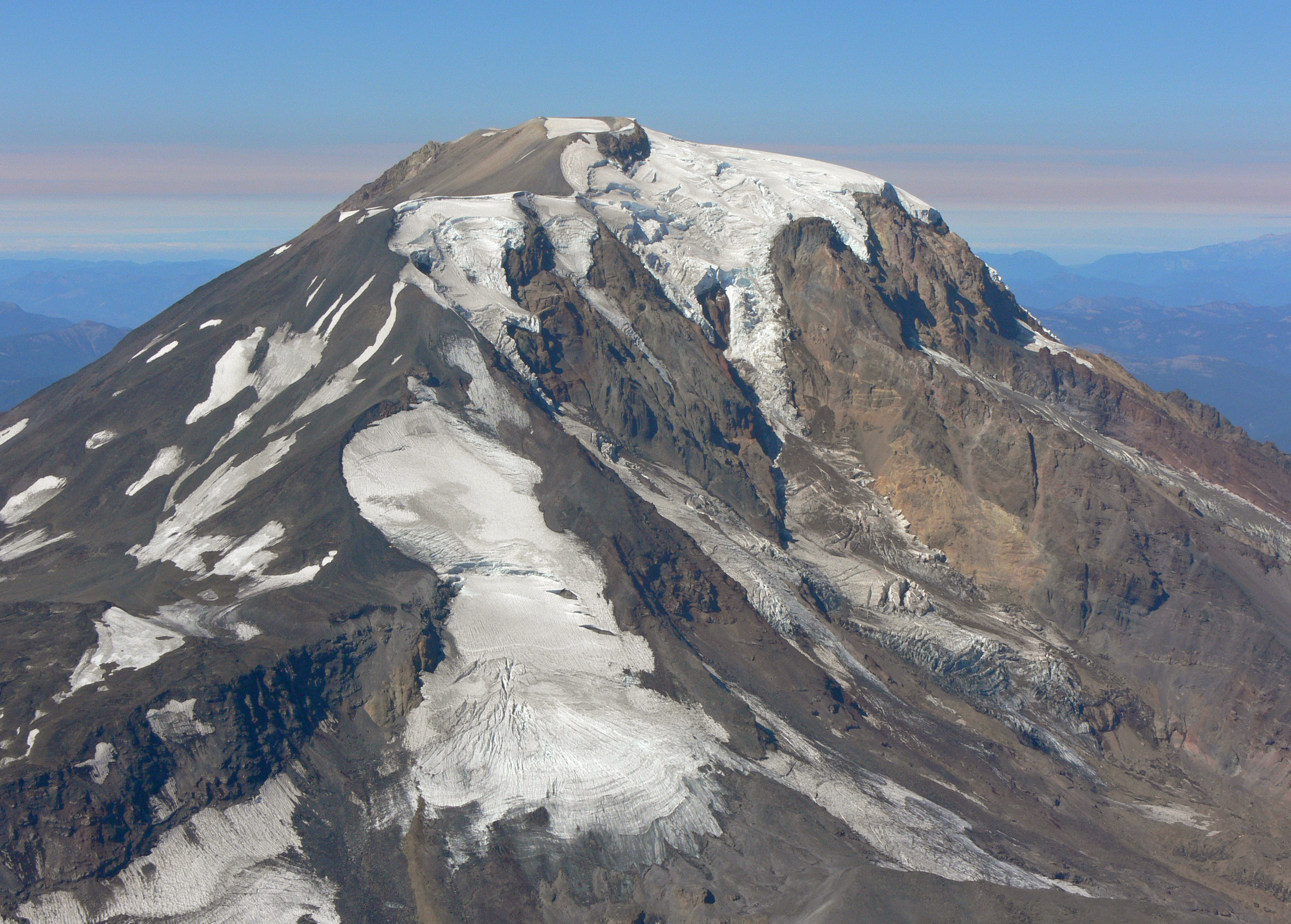
- Mazama Glacier at lower center of image

- Location within Washington (state) Location within the United States
- Type: Mountain glacier
- Location: Mount Adams, Yakima County, Washington, USA
- Coordinates: 46°10′49″N 121°28′12″W
- Area: 1.40 km^{2} (0.54 sq mi) in 2006
- Length: 1.10 mi (1.77 km)
- Terminus: Talus
- Status: Retreating

Mazama Glacier is located on the southeast slopes of Mount Adams, a stratovolcano in the U.S. state of Washington. Mazama Glacier is in the Yakama Indian Reservation. The glacier descends from approximately 10,800 ft (3,300 m) to a terminus near 7,600 ft (2,300 m). Mazama Glacier has been in a general state of retreat for over 100 years and lost 46 percent of its surface area between 1904 and 2006.

Originally known as Hell-roaring Glacier, the name was changed in 1895 by a group from the Mazamas club while they were on their second annual outing.

== Climate ==
Lunch Counter camp lies along the eastern edge of Mazama Glacier, upon Suksdorf Ridge at an elevation of 9,350 ft (2,850 m). There is no weather station, but this climate table contains interpolated data.

Climate data for Lunch Counter 46.1784 N, 121.4797 W, Elevation: 9,341 ft (2,847 m) (1991–2020 normals)
Month	Jan	Feb	Mar	Apr	May	Jun	Jul	Aug	Sep	Oct	Nov	Dec	Year
Mean daily maximum °F (°C)	25.1 (−3.8)	24.6 (−4.1)	25.9 (−3.4)	29.9 (−1.2)	38.7 (3.7)	45.7 (7.6)	56.7 (13.7)	57.1 (13.9)	51.5 (10.8)	40.6 (4.8)	28.5 (−1.9)	23.8 (−4.6)	37.3 (3.0)
Daily mean °F (°C)	19.6 (−6.9)	17.7 (−7.9)	17.9 (−7.8)	20.8 (−6.2)	28.6 (−1.9)	34.9 (1.6)	44.3 (6.8)	44.6 (7.0)	39.7 (4.3)	31.0 (−0.6)	22.5 (−5.3)	18.5 (−7.5)	28.3 (−2.0)
Mean daily minimum °F (°C)	14.0 (−10.0)	10.8 (−11.8)	10.0 (−12.2)	11.7 (−11.3)	18.5 (−7.5)	24.0 (−4.4)	32.0 (0.0)	32.2 (0.1)	27.9 (−2.3)	21.4 (−5.9)	16.5 (−8.6)	13.1 (−10.5)	19.3 (−7.0)
Average precipitation inches (mm)	14.05 (357)	10.88 (276)	11.12 (282)	7.50 (191)	5.05 (128)	3.45 (88)	0.97 (25)	1.37 (35)	3.29 (84)	8.02 (204)	13.81 (351)	15.38 (391)	94.89 (2,412)
Source: PRISM Climate Group

== See also ==
- List of glaciers in the United States
