= Salt Fork (Bonne Femme Creek tributary) =

Stream in the US state of Missouri

Coordinates: 39.194756°N 92.653238°W

Salt Fork is a stream in Howard and Randolph Counties in the U.S. state of Missouri. It is a tributary of Bonne Femme Creek.

Salt Fork was so named on account of brine springs in the area.

== See also ==
- List of rivers of Missouri
