= Bonne Femme Township, Howard County, Missouri =

Township in Howard County, Missouri, U.S.

Coordinates: 39.2142°N 92.5181°W

Bonne Femme Township is an inactive township in Howard County, in the U.S. state of Missouri.

Bonne Femme Township was erected in 1821.
