= Gotchen Glacier =

Glacier in Washington, United States

- Location within Washington (state) Location within the United States
- Type: Mountain glacier
- Location: Mount Adams, Yakima County, Washington, USA
- Coordinates: 46°09′49″N 121°28′24″W
- Area: 0.17 km^{2} (0.066 sq mi) in 2006
- Length: .20 mi (0.32 km)
- Terminus: Talus
- Status: Retreating

Gotchen Glacier is located on the south slopes of Mount Adams, a stratovolcano in the Gifford Pinchot National Forest in the U.S. state of Washington. The glacier descends from approximately 8,200 ft (2,500 m) to a terminus near 7,400 ft (2,300 m) below, where an old terminal moraine and proglacial lake exist. Gotchen Glacier has been in a general state of retreat for over 100 years and lost 78 percent of its surface area between 1904 and 2006.

== See also ==
- List of glaciers in the United States
