= Adams Fork =

Stream in Missouri, U.S.

Coordinates: 39°9′12.9″N 92°42′9.2″W

Adams Fork is a stream in Howard County, Missouri.

Adams Fork most likely derives its name from the surname Adams.

== See also ==
- List of rivers of Missouri
