= Olallie Lake (Skamania County, Washington) =

Alpine lake in Washington state

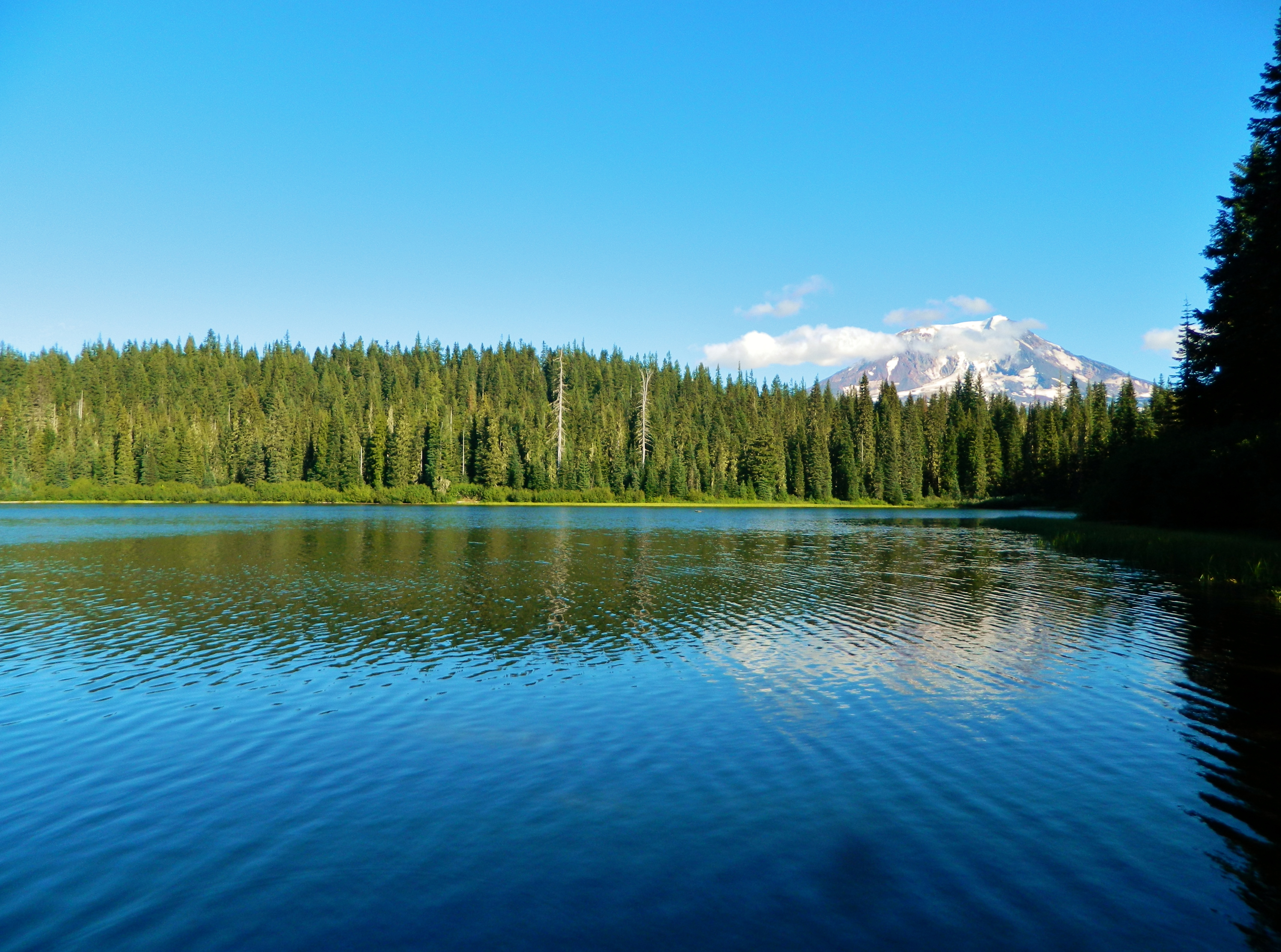
- Olallie Lake, in the High Lakes Area of Washington State

- Location within Washington (state) Location within the United States
- Location: Skamania County, Washington, United States
- Coordinates: 46°17′20″N 121°37′00″W
- Type: natural
- Primary inflows: runoff/snowmelt
- Primary outflows: Sheep Creek
- Catchment area: 0.038610 sq mi (0.10000 km^{2})
- Basin countries: United States
- Max. length: 1,210.5 ft (369.0 m)
- Max. width: 925.1 ft (282.0 m)
- Surface area: 15.8 acres (6.4 ha)
- Surface elevation: 4,242 ft (1,293 m)
- Islands: 0
- Settlements: (none)

Olallie Lake is an alpine lake and one of several in the area fed by streams coming off the glaciers from nearby Mount Adams. A small, but popular Olallie Lake Campground offers scenic camping as well as non-motorized boating and fishing experiences. It is located at 4,200 feet elevation in the Gifford Pinchot National Forest, in Washington state.

== History ==
Olallie Lake in Skamania County has been a popular recreational destination since the early 1900s and was known to Native Americans while berry picking in the Midway High Lakes Area.

== Recreation ==
The small, 15.8 acre lake is popular for fishing, camping, and photography, while offering outstanding views of Mount Adams and its sheer, glaciated northwest face as well as Adams Glacier, the second largest glacier in the contiguous United States. Adjacent Olallie Lake Campground is administered by the Cowlitz Ranger District of the Gifford Pinchot National Forest. The small, but semi-popular five site campground features a boat ramp allowing non-motorized boating and canoeing. The High Lakes Trail #116 and East Canyon Trail #265, are located near the lake and offers hikers and backpackers more views of the mountain as well as lakes, creeks, and scenic forests. The High Lakes Trail crosses the lower end of the Takh Takh Lava Flow after descending on several switchbacks down to Adams Creek. The lake is a popular summer destination, and can be accessed via Primary Road 23, to Road 5601 from Trout Lake at the southern side of Mount Adams. From Randle or Packwood in the north, it can be accessed via Primary Road 23, to Road 5601; or alternately from Packwood south on Primary Road 21, east on Road 2160, southwest on Road 56, and south on Road 2329. The loop from Packwood south to Takhlakh Lake and the surrounding Midway High Lakes including Olallie Lake, northwest along the scenic Cispus River to Randle, and back east to Packwood along US Route 12 makes up the High Lakes Loop (Scenic Driving) from the White Pass Scenic Byway.

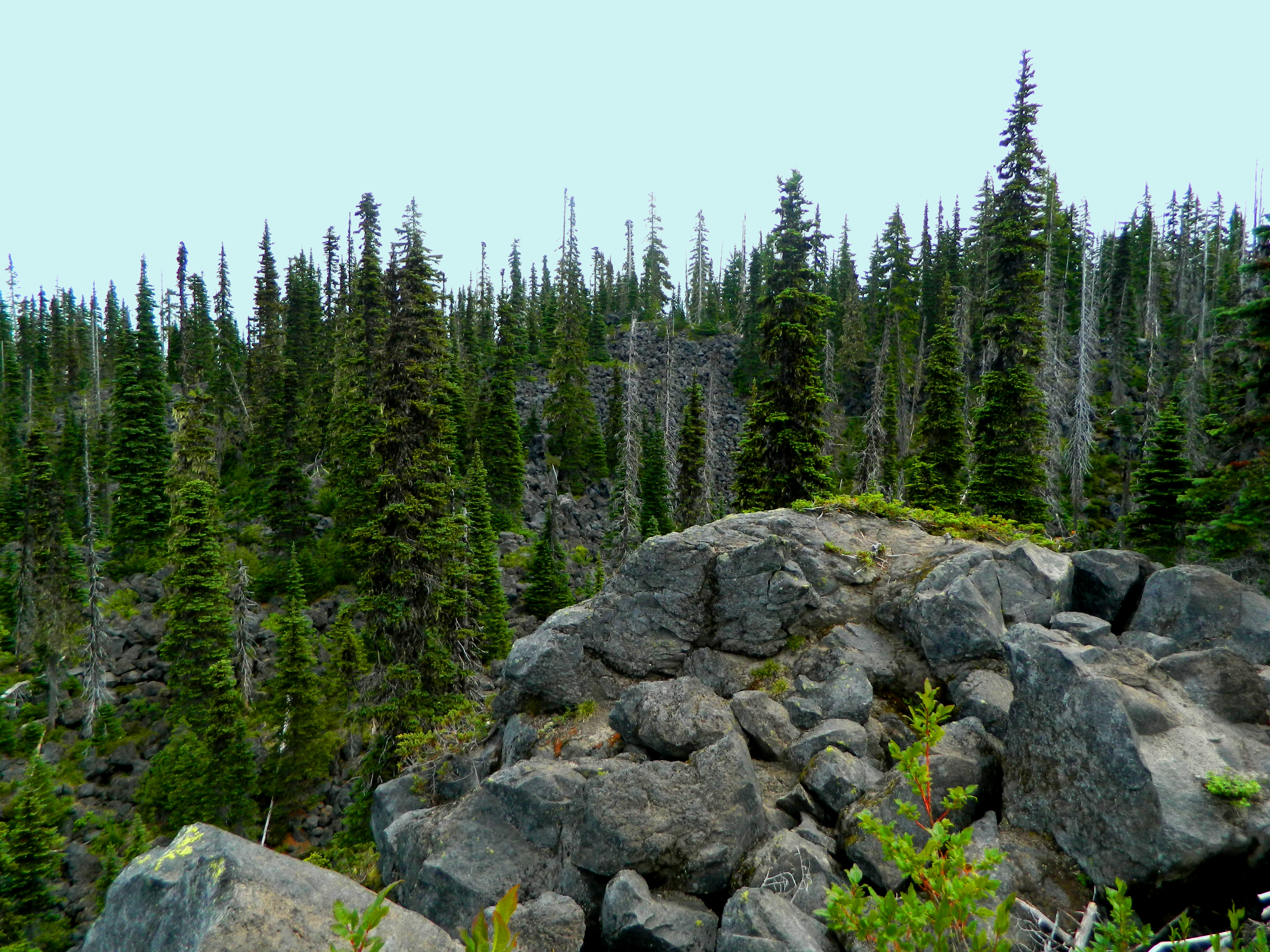
Takh Takh Lava Flow

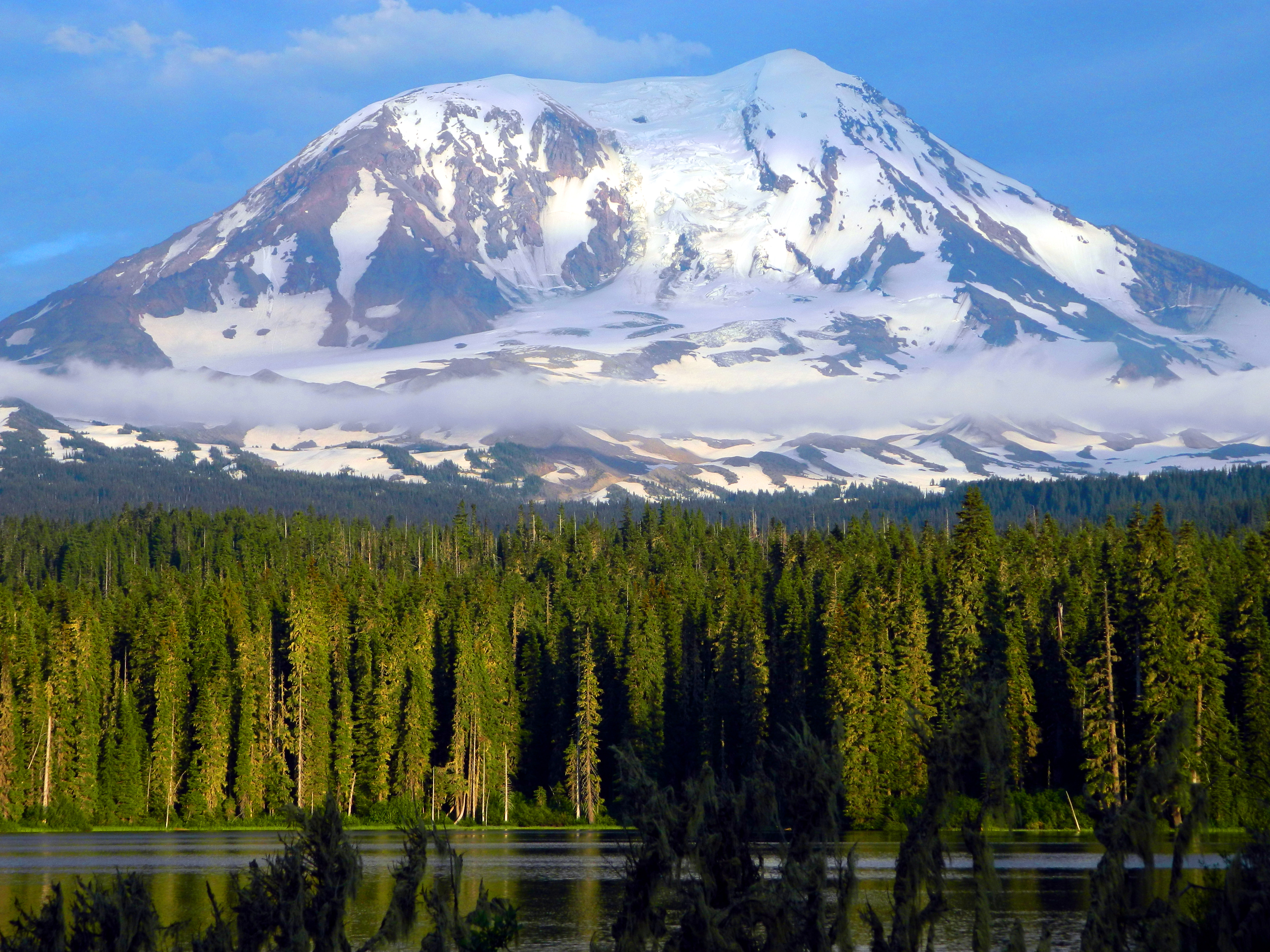
Adams Glacier cascades down the northwest face of Mount Adams in a series of icefalls.

== See also ==
- Mount Adams
- Gifford Pinchot National Forest
- Takhlakh Lake
- List of lakes in Washington
- Midway High Lakes Area
