= Babyshoe Pass =

High pass in Washington state, United States

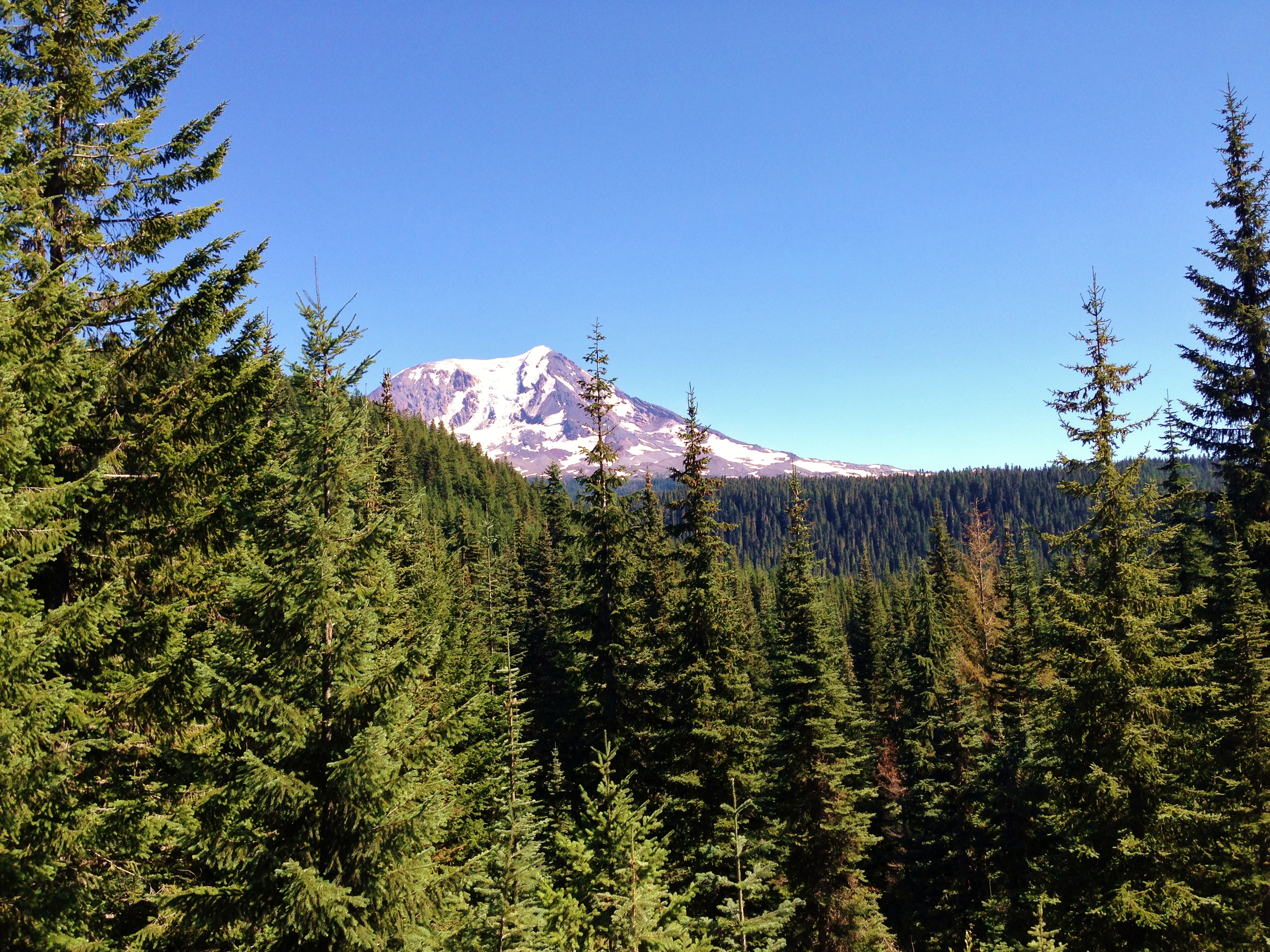
- The graveled section of Forest Route 23 traverses Babyshoe Pass, in the Midway High Lakes Area on the northwest side of Mount Adams.
- Interactive map of Babyshoe Pass
- Elevation: 4,350 feet (1,330 m)
- Traversed by: U.S. Forest Route 23

Third Approach
- Location: Skamania County, Washington, U.S.
- Range: Cascades
- Coordinates: Mapper 46°16′05″N 121°36′17″W

Babyshoe Pass, is a high pass within Gifford Pinchot National Forest. Forest Route 23 traverses the pass, northwest of Mount Adams in the State of Washington, between Mount Adams flank to the east and Babyshoe Ridge to the west. The pass separates the Lewis River Watershed and the Cispus River drainage. It was built to connect a Forest Highway (Forest Route 23) together, providing the main north-south access on the east side of the Gifford Pinchot National Forest and the many trails within or near the Mount Adams Wilderness and the Midway High Lakes Area.

The source of Babyshoe Falls is a stream that drains through the pass.

== Location ==
It is located at 4,350 feet (1,330 m) along with Primary Forest Route 23, between the Primary Forest Route 90 junction and the Primary Forest Route 21 junction. The pass is located in the Midway High Lakes Area of Mount Adams, offering five high-elevation lakes within a seven-mile radius, the most popular being Takhlakh Lake.

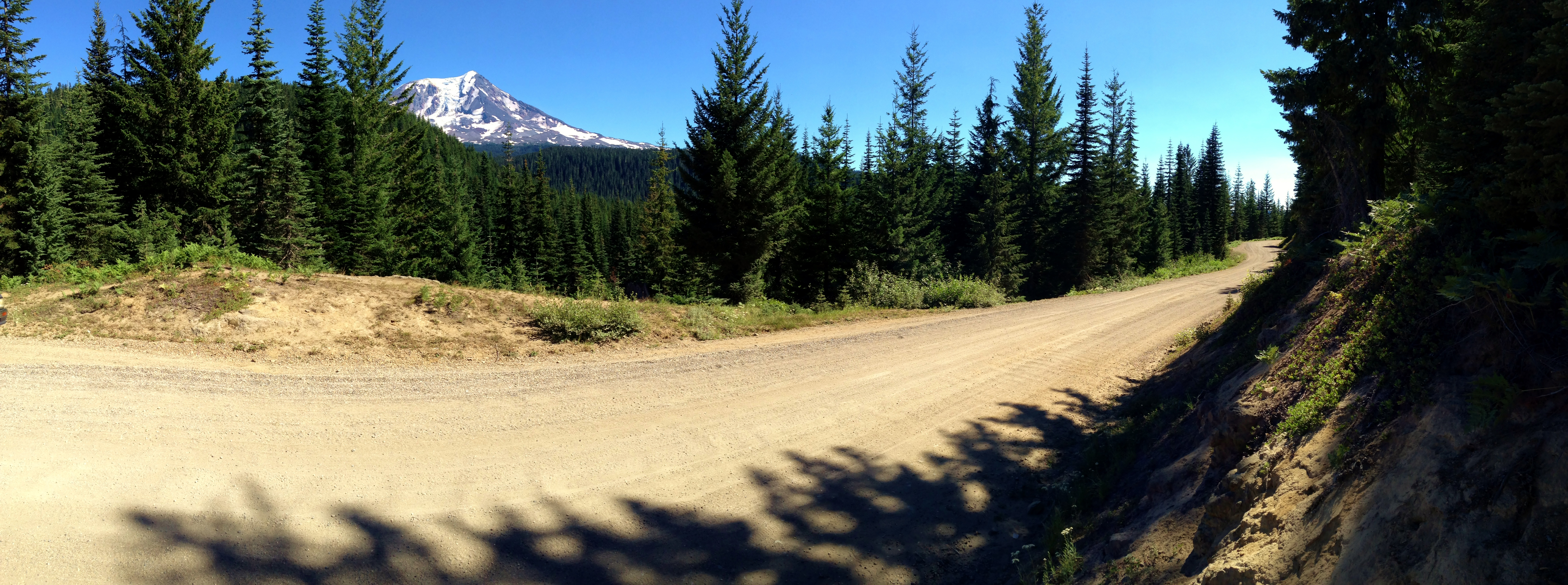
Babyshoe Pass Panorama

== See also ==
- Washington State Route 131
- Washington State Route 141
- Midway High Lakes Area
- Mount Adams
- Gifford Pinchot National Forest
