= Swampy Meadows Falls =

Waterfall in Washington State, USA

- Interactive map of Swampy Meadows Falls
- Location: Skamania County, Washington, United States
- Coordinates: 46.16222°N 121.62924°W
- Type: Tiered Horsetails
- Elevation: 3,750 ft (1,143 m)
- Total height: 52 ft (16 m)
- Number of drops: 2
- Longest drop: 30 ft (9 m)
- Total width: 25 ft (8 m)
- Average width: 25 ft (8 m)
- Watercourse: Runoff/Unnamed tributary of White Salmon River
- Average flow rate: 15 cu ft/s (0.42 m^{3}/s)

Swampy Creek Falls is a scenic, two-tiered horsetail waterfall along an unnamed tributary of the White Salmon River, originating from Swampy Meadows, on Mount Adams west slope, with a total height of 52 ft (16 m). Its main drop is about 30 ft (9 m) feet. It cascades down over an exposure of andesite, then veiling out over sloped ledges below, among a secluded forest. The falls are located not more than 800 feet from Forest Route 23, and is noted for having a secluded nature, seeming as if nothing is around for miles. It can be accessed while heading to the Midway High Lakes Area and Takhlakh Lake from Trout Lake or the Lewis River. From the road, viewers have to follow the Pacific Crest Trail for a few hundred feet, then crossing an unnamed stream on a footbridge. From here, hikers must follow the creek downstream to the top of the falls, then descending down to its base. The falls is managed by the Gifford Pinchot National Forest, of Washington state.

== See also ==
- Waterfalls
