= Claude Ewing Rusk =

American mountaineer and lawyer

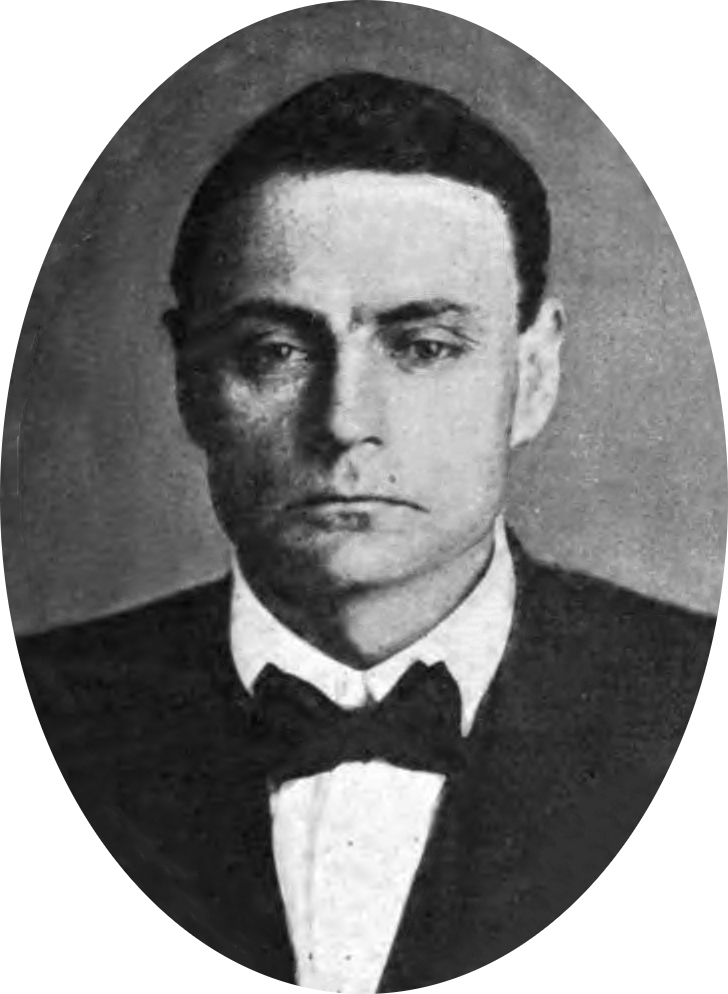
- Rusk, c. 1910
- Born: November 20, 1871; Knox County, Illinois, US
- Died: February 3, 1931 (aged 59); Grants Pass, Oregon, US
- Resting place: The Castle, Mount Adams, Washington; 46°12′07″N 121°28′56″W
- Occupations: Teacher; newspaper editor; lawyer; recipient of the US Land Office, Yakima, WA; author; justice of the peace, Grants Pass, OR
- Known for: First ascent direct up Boulder Ridge, Mount Baker; First ascent of the east side of Glacier Peak; First ascent of the east side of Mount Adams
- Notable work: Tales of a Western Mountaineer

Claude Ewing Rusk (November 20, 1871 – February 3, 1931), also known as C. E. Rusk, was an American mountaineer, lawyer, and writer from Washington who pioneered routes up Mount Adams, Mount Baker, and Glacier Peak. He also ascended many other peaks in Washington, Oregon, and California.

== Personal life ==
=== Early life ===
Rusk was born on November 20, 1871, in Knox County, Illinois to James A. and Josie A. Rusk. His family emigrated from Illinois to Washington Territory in the fall of 1874. They settled in eastern Klickitat County in an area known as Wood Gulch. In 1878, Rusk's only sibling, Leah, was born. Several years later, in 1879, they moved to the foot of the Columbia Hills in the lower Klickitat Valley near Warwick. Over the next year, Rusk's father built the Happy Home stage station. Rusk often went to the top of the Columbia Hills to gaze at the various peaks of the Cascade Range. They lived in this place until Rusk was 15. They then moved to a homestead on the banks of the Klickitat River near Soda Springs in January 1887.

=== Career ===
Rusk had received a public school education and in 1888, when he was 17, he began his career, teaching school at Camas Prairie in the Glenwood Valley. Later, he taught at the Crossroads School outside Goldendale until 1892 when he became the editor of the Goldendale Courier. This he did for a year and went back to teaching the next year. He also began studying law in the office of Nelson B. Brooks and Snover at about the same time. On October 30, 1898, Rusk married Rachel N. Gilmore, also the child of pioneers. In 1902, Rusk completed his law training and was admitted to the Washington State Bar Association. Also in 1902, Rusk became one of the founding members of the American Alpine Club. Rusk and his wife moved to Hamilton, Washington in 1903, but only stayed there for about a year before they moved to Lake Chelan and bought a home along a remote portion of the lake. Rusk became a member of the Mazamas club in 1904. Rusk practiced law in the town of Chelan until 1910. While they were living on Lake Chelan, on June 10, 1905, their only son, Rodney L. Rusk, was born.

In 1910, Rusk led an expedition to Mount McKinley and when he returned, they moved to the area of Grants Pass in Oregon where his parents were living. There, he helped his parents, working in their Lucky Spot gold mine. In 1912, he moved back to Washington, to the Yakima Valley. He became the editor of the Benton Independent published in Prosser, a position he held for a year before selling the paper and resuming law practice. He continued his practice until the spring of 1915 when he was appointed to a four-year term as the receiver for the United States Land Office in Yakima. During his time in the Yakima Valley, Rusk became a vocal conservationist. He was an admirer of Theodore Roosevelt and started a local campaign to get Mount Adams set aside as a national park. He felt that it was high time that it got the recognition it deserved and in 1919, he wrote the short booklet Mount Adams–Towering Sentinel of the Lower Columbia Basin, in which he laid out his case for the Yakima National Park as he called it. In 1920, Rusk was a founding member of the Cascadians mountaineering club and became its first president. Later, he also served as the chairman of the outing committee. Some of his closest friends he met while a member of the club. In 1922, the members of the Cascadians presented Rusk with a Swiss ice-axe as a gift for being an inspiring leader and being the first president of the club.

=== Later life ===
Rusk's father died in 1923 and Rusk moved back to Grants Pass. After the move, he started up his law practice again. In 1924, he wrote Tales of a Western Mountaineer, his only published book. Some time after his first book was published, Rusk wrote another book, Timberline Campfires. This collection of essays and short stories was never published except for one chapter, "The Wonderful Story of Abe Lincoln," which was published in the American Alpine Journal in 1946. After some time in Grants Pass, Rusk was appointed to the position of justice of the peace. He was known to be quite the prohibitionist and would throw the book at bootleggers. In addition to being justice of the peace, Rusk worked his father's Lucky Spot mine on the weekends, walking 14 miles there and back. In 1930, Rusk attempted to organize an expedition to Mount St. Elias; however, no one else was able to go with him and he went by himself. During this expedition, he contracted a cold, which lingered and, according to Rusk, strained his heart. Rusk died of heart disease on February 2, 1931, in Grants Pass, Oregon. Rusk, about two months prior, requested that some members of the Cascadians take his ashes and place them in a cairn on The Castle of his beloved Mount Adams. Clarence Truitt and Clarence Starcher completed this request on July 27, 1931. This small monument remains today.

== Mountaineering career ==
Rusk's mountaineering career took him all over the West Coast of the United States, beginning in 1889 and continuing to 1930. He met many other people on his many journeys; however, few people became close friends and learned about his personal life. The few who knew him described him as one of the most expert and daring mountaineers in the West. While Rusk had some close calls and got himself into some hair raising situations, he had very few accidents while climbing and often saved others from extreme danger. He was not braggadocious about his exploits and in fact would only give the most matter-of-fact answers about them. He was known to be tenacious in his exploits, yet tempered by his good sense and consideration for others with him. Rusk was most familiar with Mount Adams, climbing it many times and exploring the area around it extensively.

=== Early expeditions ===
Rusk began his mountaineering career in the summer following the completion of his first year of teaching school. He and his uncle W. A. Maxwell ascended Mount Adams via the South Climb. The next year, 1890, he, his mother Josie, and his sister Leah completed a circuit of Adams. This was the first recorded circuit by white women and likely the first recorded circuit by anyone. On this trip, he named Avalanche Valley and Rusk Glacier; however, the Rusk Glacier name was not official until 1901 when Rusk assisted Harry Fielding Reid in mapping Adams.

One of the novelties of mountaineering in the late 1800s and early 1900s was to burn a large red fire on the summit of the high peaks and so "illuminate" it. In 1891, Rusk and several others attempted to illuminate Adams, but were turned back at the false summit by a storm with hurricane force winds.

In 1895, he joined the party from the Mazamas mountaineering club for the first heliograph signaling between the peaks of the Cascades which included, from north to south, Mount Baker, Mount Rainier, Mount Adams, Mount Hood, Mount Jefferson, and Diamond Peak. This endeavor was only partially successful due to smoke and logistical problems and only the parties on Hood and Adams were able to communicate. Also on this expedition, three people from the Mazamas measured the altitude of Adams. Rusk, who had long held that Adams was one of the tallest in the range, was pleased to learn that it was over 12,000 feet (3,700 m).

Two years later, 1897, Rusk, his mother, and his sister climbed Adams again. Afterwards, they went to the Ridge of Wonders and his mother, awestruck by the scene, insisted that it should be known as such.

=== Mapping Mount Adams ===
For 14 days in 1901, Rusk assisted Harry Fielding Reid in mapping Mount Adams. Before they began, they ascended Adams with two others, Nelson B. Brooks and Dr. H. S. Goddard, and then circled the mountain with Rusk leading. As they came around the mountain, Rusk suggested names for several of the glaciers. He wanted to name Adams Glacier as Reid Glacier in honor of Reid; however, Reid insisted that it should be named something else because he thought it improper to place his own name on the map that he was making and the Mazamas were trying to name a glacier on Mount Hood after him. This eventually persuaded Rusk, but years later when he wrote Tales, Rusk repeated his wish that the glacier be known as Reid Glacier. Rusk also recommended that the Lyman Glacier be named as such in honor of William Denison Lyman, who had done some to the first research into Adams. Reid officially named Rusk Glacier after him.

=== 1902 Mazamas outing ===
The Mazamas returned to Adams in July 1902 and Rusk joined them with a small group from eastern Klickitat County. The Mazamas had some logistical problems and were not able to climb the day that Rusk and the rest of his party did. After Rusk's party reached the summit, one of them, whom he called Mrs. Blank to protect her identity, collapsed. They made use of a human toboggan to get her down the mountain. Two days later, Rusk joined the Mazamas party in their ascent.

=== Mount Baker climb ===
In 1903, after the Rusks had moved to Hamilton, Rusk and his wife attempted to climb Mount Baker. They were unsuccessful because poor weather turned them away. Later that same year, Rusk made another attempt with George G. Cantwell and W. A. Alexander. Rusk and Cantwell were successful in making the ascent, which was the seventh ascent of Baker and the first direct up the Boulder Ridge.

=== Gathering of the Mountain Clans ===
Rusk participated in a "gathering of the mountain clans" on Mount Rainier in 1905. Always a leader in the mountains, he went with a scouting party from Paradise Park around to the west side of Rainier, possibly up Kautz Cleaver, in an attempt to find a route that avoided the notorious rockfall on the normal Gibraltar route. Unsuccessful, the scouting party returned and rejoined the rest of the party for the ascent. Over 200 members from the Sierra Club, American Alpine Club, Mazamas, and the Appalachian Mountain Club were attempting the climb. Because there were so many attempting the climb, the clubs divided into two parties and climbed on succeeding days. Ninety-eight people completed the ascent including Rusk who volunteered as a leader of one of the groups.

=== Glacier Peak climb ===
Rusk climbed Glacier Peak in August 1906 with A. L. Cool. They were the third party to climb Glacier Peak and the first to climb the east side. The day before the climb, Rusk named Cool Glacier after Cool as he was the first person to set foot on it. The day after the climb, while they were exploring the lower slopes of Glacier Peak, Rusk named Chocolate Glacier after the chocolate colored water the emanated from it. A later mapping error switched the names from what Rusk had intended. With the ascent of Glacier Peak, Rusk became the first person to climb the four peaks of Washington over 10,000 feet (3,000 m).

=== McKinley expedition ===
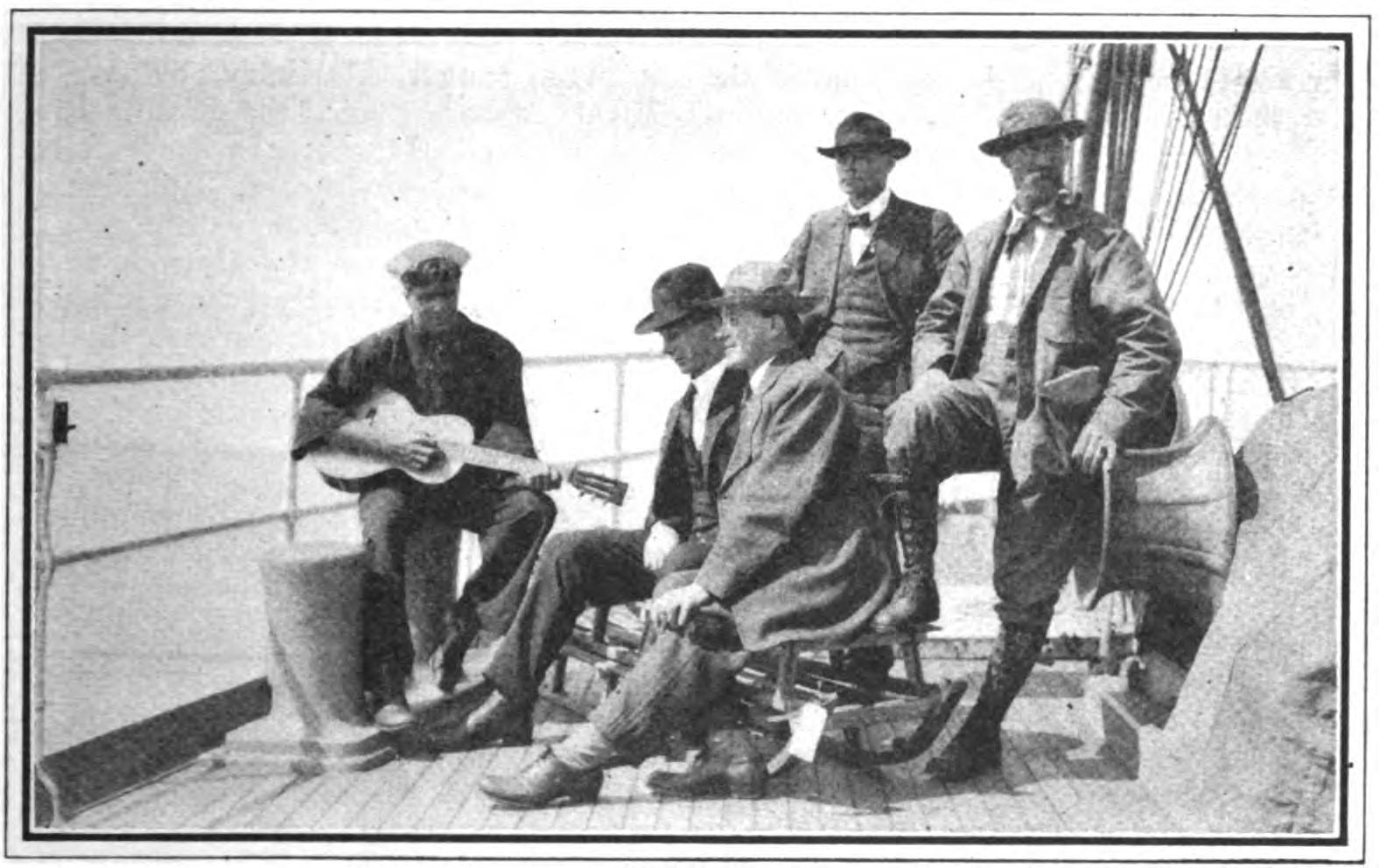
The four members of the Mazamas McKinley expedition being entertained by a musical member of the crew of the Tahoma. Right to left: A. L. Cool, Claude Ewing Rusk, Frank H. Rojec, and Joseph Ridley

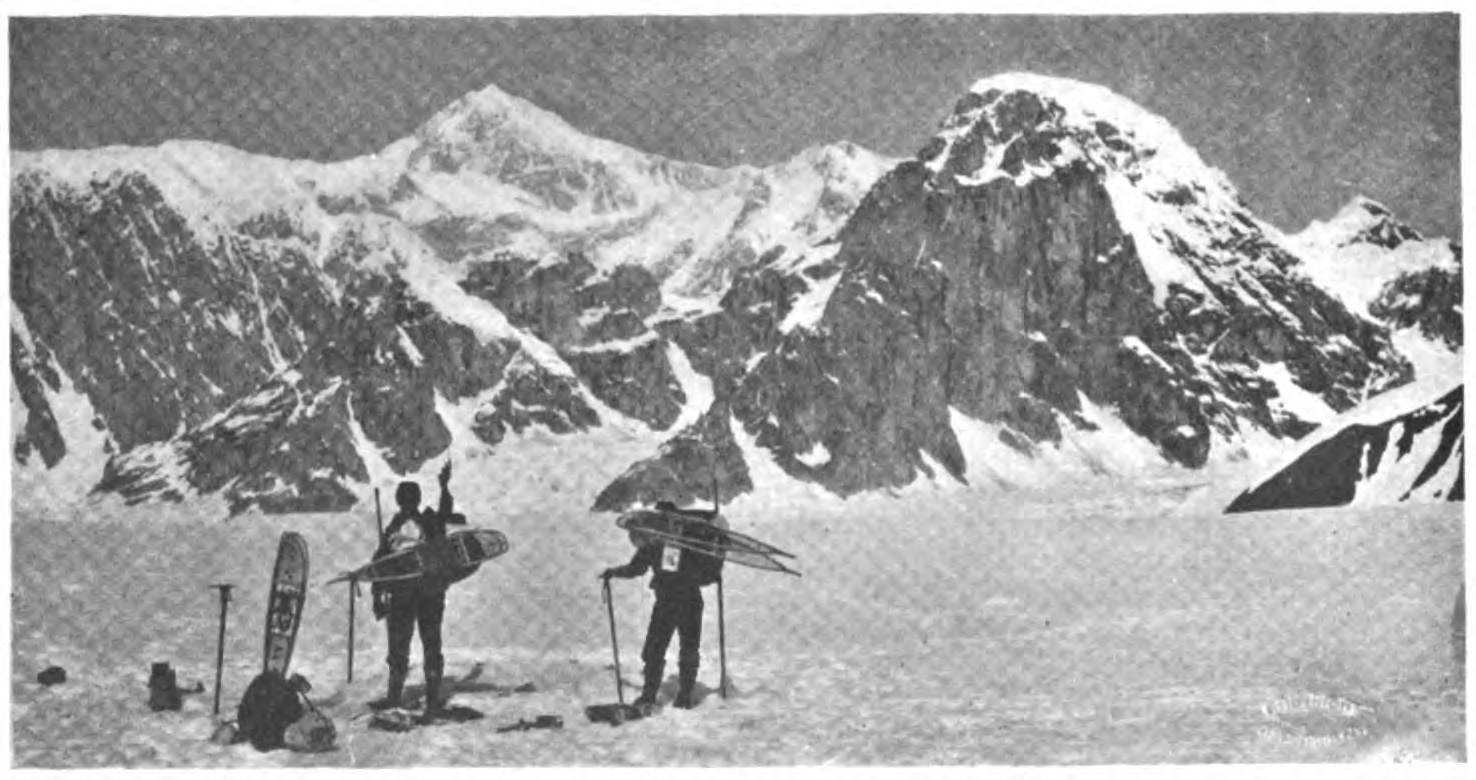
Members of the Mazamas McKinley expedition give a final salute to Mount McKinley as they prepare to leave. McKinley is the highest peak in the background.

In 1910, Rusk led an expedition to Mount McKinley sponsored by The Pacific Monthly, The Oregonian, the New York Herald, and members of the Mazamas club. Rusk initiated the expedition when he wrote to Charles H. Sholes of the Mazamas and asked Sholes to join him in an expedition to the mountain. Sholes was unable to join him, but shouldered the responsibility of organizing the expedition and raising funds for it. Eventually, there were three others who accompanied Rusk on the expedition, A. L. Cool, Joseph Ridley, and Frank H. Rojec. Cool was a good friend of Rusk's from the area around Lake Chelan who was well known as an expert mountaineer and guide. Ridley was a forest ranger on the Mount Baker National Forest who had done much exploring and mapping in the area around Mount Baker. Rojec, the photographer for the expedition, worked for the Kiser Photography Company and was well known for his pictures of Western scenery. Their mission was to establish whether Dr. Frederick Cook had indeed made it to the summit, as well as to reach the summit themselves. From Seattle, they took the United States revenue cutter Tahoma to Cook Inlet. From there, they took the sternwheeler Alice up the Susitna River to the mouth of the Chulitna River and then hired a local to guide them up the Chulitna and then two miles up the Tokositna River where they established a base camp. From there they worked their way to the toe of the Ruth Glacier and then up the Ruth Glacier toward McKinley. It was terribly difficult work because for each mile they advanced, they were required to travel five miles back and forth to get all their equipment up the glacier. They also had underestimated the amount of food they needed for the expedition so Cool returned to the base camp to wait for the return of their guide with more supplies. Rusk, from information given to him by S. P. Beecher, a member of the Cook expedition, and after some exploration up a tributary glacier opposite Mount Church, quickly became convinced that Cook had not actually climbed McKinley, but instead climbed a much shorter peak about 20 miles from McKinley. Rusk named four peaks at the head of this tributary glacier: Mounts Sholes, Mazama, Glisan, and Lee. Sholes, Glisan, and Lee were named after prominent members of the Mazamas club. From there they proceeded up the Ruth Glacier passing through The Great Gorge and into the Ruth Amphitheater. At this point, Rusk no longer had any doubts that Cook had not summited McKinley. As he wrote in his article detailing the expedition, they "realized that it would require perhaps weeks or months in which to explore a route to the summit, we realized how utterly impossible and absurd was the story of this man [Cook], who, carrying a pack, claims to have started from the mouth of the Tokositna on the eighth of September, and to have stood on the highest point of McKinley on the sixteenth of the same month. The man does not live who can perform such a feat!" At this point, their food supplies were too low for them to continue further and they were forced to retreat back down the glacier. There was another expedition led by Professor Herschel Clifford Parker and Belmore Browne attempting to summit McKinley at the same time. They also failed to reach the summit due to similar circumstances and later reinforced Rusk's conclusion by finding the very rock that Cook took his famous picture on. The Mazamas expedition had other problems as well. Sometime while they were on the Ruth Glacier, one of the members attempted to kill Rusk by hitting him with a snowshoe, but could not bring himself to finish the job.

=== Exploration of the East Side of Adams ===
Rusk returned to Adams in 1918, making a brief visit to the east side with Joe G. Hill and S. E. Sampson and verified the infeasibility of climbing the whole of Battlement Ridge. The next year he returned. This time he spent 10 days examining various possible routes with an inexperienced climber, J. Howard Green. During this trip, Rusk named the Wilson Glacier, Victory Ridge, and Roosevelt Cliff. The Wilson Glacier he named in honor of Woodrow Wilson for being the World War I president. He named Victory Ridge in honor of the victory achieved in World War I. Roosevelt Cliff he named in honor of Theodore Roosevelt, who had been a champion of conservation. In another error in cartography, the name was later moved from its intended landform. In Tales of a Western Mountaineer, Rusk describes his original intent as "[j]ust beyond the southernmost ice-fall of Wilson Glacier rises a high abrupt precipice and we agreed that it might as well be christened 'Roosevelt Cliff.'" This is the ridge that divides the Wilson Glacier in two. Rusk made three exploratory attempts up the east side of Adams. The first was up Victory Ridge. They climbed up the ridge to over 9,000 feet (2,700 m), but were blocked from further progress by a dangerously narrow section of the ridge. Rusk camped here for the night to test how a climbing party that might have to spend the night on the mountain would fare at that altitude. The next attempt was up the northern arm of the Wilson Glacier. On this attempt, Rusk was able to reach an elevation of about 10,000 feet (3,000 m), but turned back for fear of avalanches and his concern for Green's safety. As Rusk and Green continued to the north, they passed through the area of Devils Gardens and Rusk named it as such because of the curious lava formations. The final attempt was up the Lava Ridge. On this attempt, they reached the lower extreme of the summit ice cap somewhere near 10,500 feet (3,200 m), but were turned back again by falling rocks that Rusk described as hurtling "down the slope with the speed of a rifle-ball." Rusk felt that it would be dangerous to continue with his inexperienced companion, but he also felt that a well-equipped, experienced party could easily climb the route.

=== Mount Stuart climbs ===
Rusk first climbed Mount Stuart in 1920. When he first saw it in 1894, Rusk desired to climb it; however, other matters, including the McKinley expedition, prevented him from climbing it. That same year, 1920, the Cascadians mountaineering club was formed and with Rusk as a leading member, they decided that a record box should be taken to the summit. Rusk climbed Stuart with Rolfe Morse Whitnall in July and although Whitnall was unable to make the summit, Rusk was successful and placed the record box on the summit. Their success inspired the club to send another party later that year on Labor Day. This party consisted of Clarence Truitt, Harold Carey, Vern Mason, Joseph R. Vincent, Rolland Whitmore, Wayne E. and Fern Richardson, Rolfe and Alice Whitnall, and Rusk. The whole party made the summit, even though they had some close calls and were forced to bivouac part of the way down the mountain. Rusk climbed Stuart again the next year with Wayne Richardson, Truitt, Rolfe Whitnall, Max Hiscock, and Jimmie Frisque. That year, they climbed earlier in the season, May 29, than any party before and many thought that there was still too much snow to climb at that time in the season. All but Whitnall made the summit. Rusk led another much larger party up Stuart on May 29, 1922.

=== Conquest of the Great East Side ===
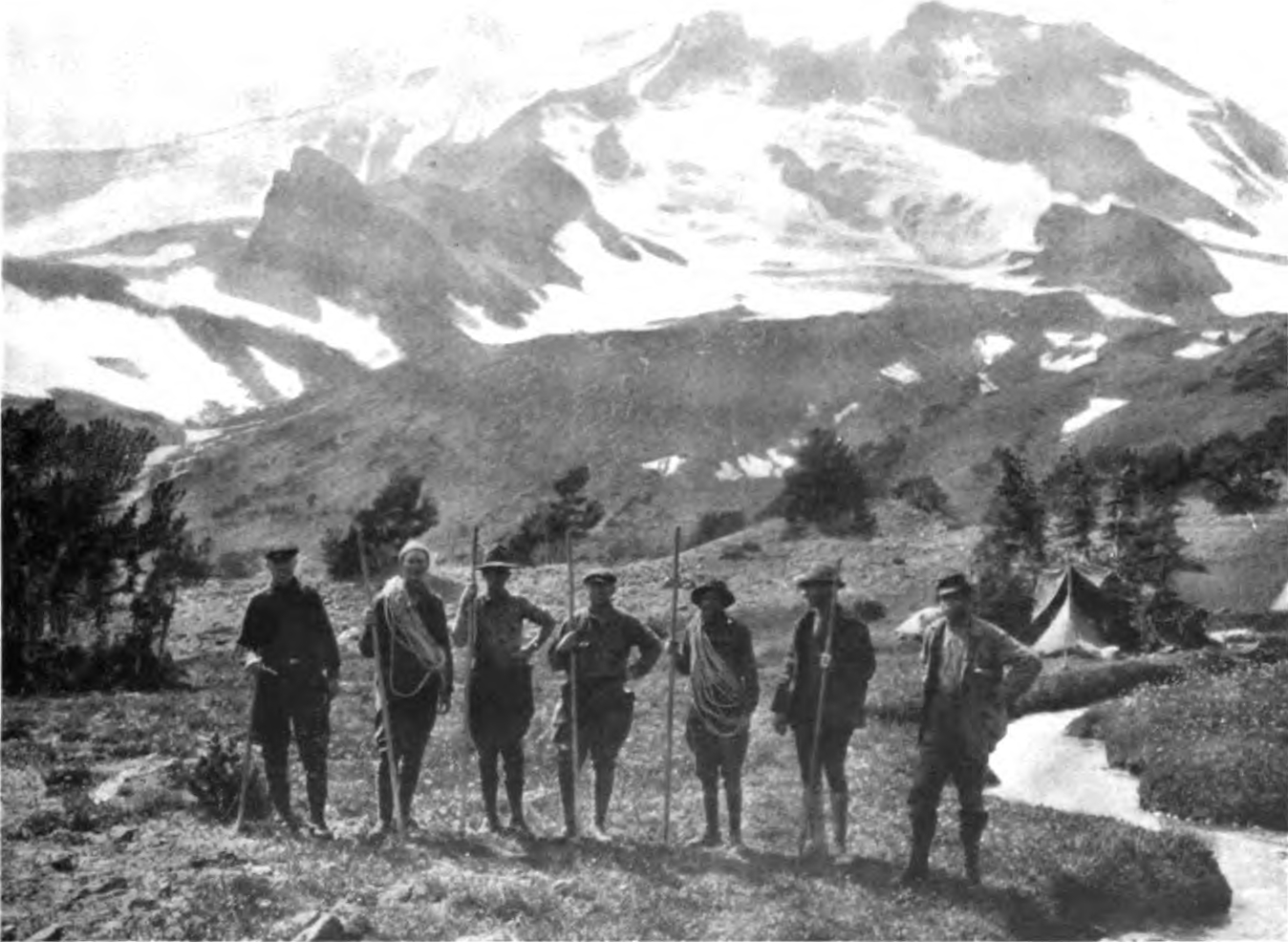
Cascadians Climbing Party on the east side of Adams after the ascent. Left to Right: Richardson, Starcher, Truitt, Williams, Whitmore, Coursen, Rusk

In 1921, in addition to climbing Mount Stuart, Rusk and a group from the Cascadians went on an expedition to Mount Adams. This expedition had as its primary goal to climb the "Great East Side" of Adams. They made their base camp in Avalanche Valley. Fifteen members of the Cascadians completed a climb up the south side of the mountain. However, the main climb was the ascent up the east side led by Rusk. The rest of those in this group were Edgar E. Coursen, Wayne Richardson, Clarence Truitt, Rolland Whitmore, Robert E. Williams, and Clarence Starcher. The route was very difficult for the climbing equipment that they had available, which was limited to two Swiss ice-axes, five alpenstocks, rope, and hobnailed boots. Their route took them up the Rusk Glacier to the base of the Battlement Ridge, up onto Battlement Ridge and over The Castle, and finally, through the maze of crevasses on the vast summit ice cap. The route was very difficult and it took a great amount of time to reach The Castle and required that they bivouac for the night on the west side of The Castle next to the summit ice cap. The route also made it clear that there was to be no easy retreat. The whole party completed the climb. Some climbers who had come up from the south side, who some in the Cascadians party knew, were incredulous and could not believe that they had made the climb from the east side.

=== Mount Hood climb ===
Mount Hood was one of the first mountains Rusk saw when he and his family came from Illinois; however, he did not get to climb it until much later, in 1922. This climb he made solo up the Cooper Spur route. Once he got to the top, he spent a long time with the fire lookout, Charles A. Phelps, who regaled him of many his adventures as the lookout. On the way back down, Rusk had one of his few climbing accidents, losing his footing and sliding quickly down the slope for a short distance.

=== Mount Shasta climbs ===
The last major Cascade Mountain to be conquered by Rusk that he wrote about was Mount Shasta. He and four members from the Cascadians made an attempt to climb the peak in 1922. The four from the Cascadians were Wayne and Fern Richardson, Clarence Truitt, and Rolfe Whitnall. They nearly made it to the summit, but were balked by sheets of ice in the last hundred feet or so. The next year Rusk made a solo ascent and this time he was successful. Rusk closed his Tales by stating "[m]y third of a century of mountaineering was more than rounded out, and, if this should be my last journey to the ice-bound heights, I could not complain."

=== Final expeditions ===
While Shasta was the last mountaineering adventure that Rusk wrote about, he would continue to climb peaks around his Grants Pass home including Mount Thielsen. However, Rusk most desired to return to Alaska and at last conquer Mount McKinley. Over the following years, Rusk promoted another expedition, but could not get any financial backing. Eventually, he decided to organize an expedition to Mount St. Elias instead. Several members of the Mazamas and Cascadians initially said they would go along, but all eventually backed out for various reasons. In 1930, Rusk went by himself to climb St. Elias. When he arrived in Yakutat, he hired a local native to go with him and they set out. However, the boat they took to reach the head of the bay that is the access point to climb the mountain accidentally dropped them off on an island. Rusk and his companion were trapped for weeks waiting for the return of the boat. This was the last expedition that Rusk would go on because he died in February the next year.

== Written works ==
Rusk was a very good writer, with beautiful flowing prose and fabulous descriptions that make the reader feel as if they are there with him. His writing has been compared to the English mountaineers Edward Whymper and Adolphus Warburton Moore. In addition to his book, Tales of a Western Mountaineer, he wrote several articles over the course of his life. "The Fourth of July on Mount Adams" and "Illuminating Mount Adams" describe the illumination attempt of Mount Adams. "On the Trail of Dr. Cook," published in three parts, is Rusk's account of the Mazamas McKinley expedition. "The Snow Peaks of the Cascades" describes the various peaks of the Cascade Range. Rusk's other book, Timberline Campfires, was never published except for one chapter, "The Wonderful Story of Abe Lincoln," published in the American Alpine Journal in 1946. His Mount Adams–Towering Sentinel of the Lower Columbia Basin promoted creating a national park protecting Mount Adams.

== Bibliography ==
- Rusk, Claude Ewing (1978) [1924]. Tales of a Western Mountaineer (1st ed.). Seattle, Washington: The Mountaineers. ISBN 0-916890-62-7. LCCN 78054427. OCLC 4667368. OL 11004497M.
- Lloyd, Darryl (1978). Portrait of C. E. Rusk (1st ed.). Seattle, Washington: The Mountaineers. ISBN 0-916890-62-7. LCCN 78054427. OCLC 4667368.
- Metcalfe, Gertrude (September 1910). Wells, William Bittle; Pease, Lute (eds.). "Mount McKinley and the Mazama Expedition". The Pacific Monthly. Vol. 24, no. 3. Portland, Oregon: Pacific Monthly Publishing Company. pp. 255–265.
- Rusk, Claude Ewing (October 1910). Wells, William Bittle; Pease, Lute (eds.). "On the Trail of Dr. Cook: Part I". The Pacific Monthly. Vol. 24, no. 4. Portland, Oregon: Pacific Monthly Publishing Company. pp. 430–442.
- Rusk, Claude Ewing (November 1910). Wells, William Bittle; Pease, Lute (eds.). "On the Trail of Dr. Cook: Part II". The Pacific Monthly. Vol. 24, no. 5. Portland, Oregon: Pacific Monthly Publishing Company. pp. 472–486.
- Rusk, Claude Ewing (January 1911). Wells, William Bittle; Pease, Lute (eds.). "On the Trail of Dr. Cook: Part III". The Pacific Monthly. Vol. 25, no. 1. Portland, Oregon: Pacific Monthly Publishing Company. pp. 48–62.
- Winchester, J. W. (March 1911). Wells, William Bittle; Pease, Lute (eds.). "Dr. Cook, Faker". The Pacific Monthly. Vol. 25, no. 3. Portland, Oregon: Pacific Monthly Publishing Company. pp. 251–256.
- Lyman, William Denison (1919). History of the Yakima Valley, Washington: Comprising Yakima, Kittitas, and Benton Counties (1st ed.). Seattle, Washington: The S. J. Clarke Publishing Co. pp. 741–742.
- "Rusk, Klickitat Pioneer, Passes". The Klickitat County Agriculturist. Goldendale, Washington. February 13, 1931.
- "Local News". The Goldendale Sentinel. Goldendale, Washington. February 12, 1931.
- Reid, Harry Fielding (July 1906). "Studies of the Glaciers of Mount Hood and Mount Adams". Zeitschrift für Gletscherkunde, für Eiszeitforschung und Geschicte des Klimas. Annales de Glaciologie. Annals of Glaciology. Annali di Glaciologia. 1 (2). Berlin, Germany: Verlag von Gebrüder Bokntraeger: 113–131.
- Reid, Harry Fielding (December 1905). "The Glaciers of Mt. Hood and Mt. Adams". Mazama. 2 (4). Portland, OR: Mazamas: 194–200.
- Coursen, Edgar E. (December 1921). "The Mount Adams Outing of the Cascadians". Mazama. 6 (2). Portland, OR: Mazamas: 46–47.
- Lyman, William Denison (July 1903). "Mount Adams Outing, 1902". Mazama. 2 (3). Portland, OR: Mazamas: 164–175.
- Rusk, Claude Ewing (July 1892). Harte, Bret (ed.). "The Fourth of July on Mount Adams". The Overland Monthly. Vol. 20, no. 115. San Francisco, California: Overland Monthly Publishing Company. pp. 92–97.
- Rusk, Claude Ewing (July 1892). "Illuminating Mount Adams". The Great Divide.
- Metcalfe, Gertrude (December 1905). "The Rainier Climb". Mazama. 2 (4). Portland, OR: Mazamas: 224–234.
- Metcalfe, Gertrude (March 1907). "List of Ascents of Mount Baker". Mazama. 3 (1). Portland, OR: Mazamas: 20–21.
- "Note and Comment". Mazama. 3 (1). Portland, OR: Mazamas: 75. March 1907.
- Rusk, Claude Ewing (May 1893). Redway, Jacques W. (ed.). "The Snow Peaks of the Cascades". Goldthwaites Geographical Magazine. Vol. 5, no. 5. The Goldthwaites. pp. 182–184.
- Nelson, L. A. (November 1910). "Record of Ascents of Glacier Peak" (PDF). The Mountaineer. 3. Seattle, WA: Mountaineers: 25–28.
- Zimmermann, T. C. Price (1979). "Book Reviews: Tales of a Western Mountaineer". American Alpine Journal. 22 (1). Golden, CO: American Alpine Club: 331.
- Meany, Edmond S. (April 1925). "Book Reviews: Tales of a Western Mountaineer" (PDF). The Washington Historical Quarterly. 16 (2). Seattle, WA: The Washington University State Historical Society: 153–154.
- Beckey, Fred (August 15, 2000). Cascade Alpine Guide: Climbing and High Routes. Vol. Columbia River to Stevens Pass (3rd ed.). Seattle, Washington: Mountaineers Books. pp. 56–76. ISBN 0-89886-577-8.
