= Horseshoe Lake (Skamania County, Washington) =

Lake in the State of Washington

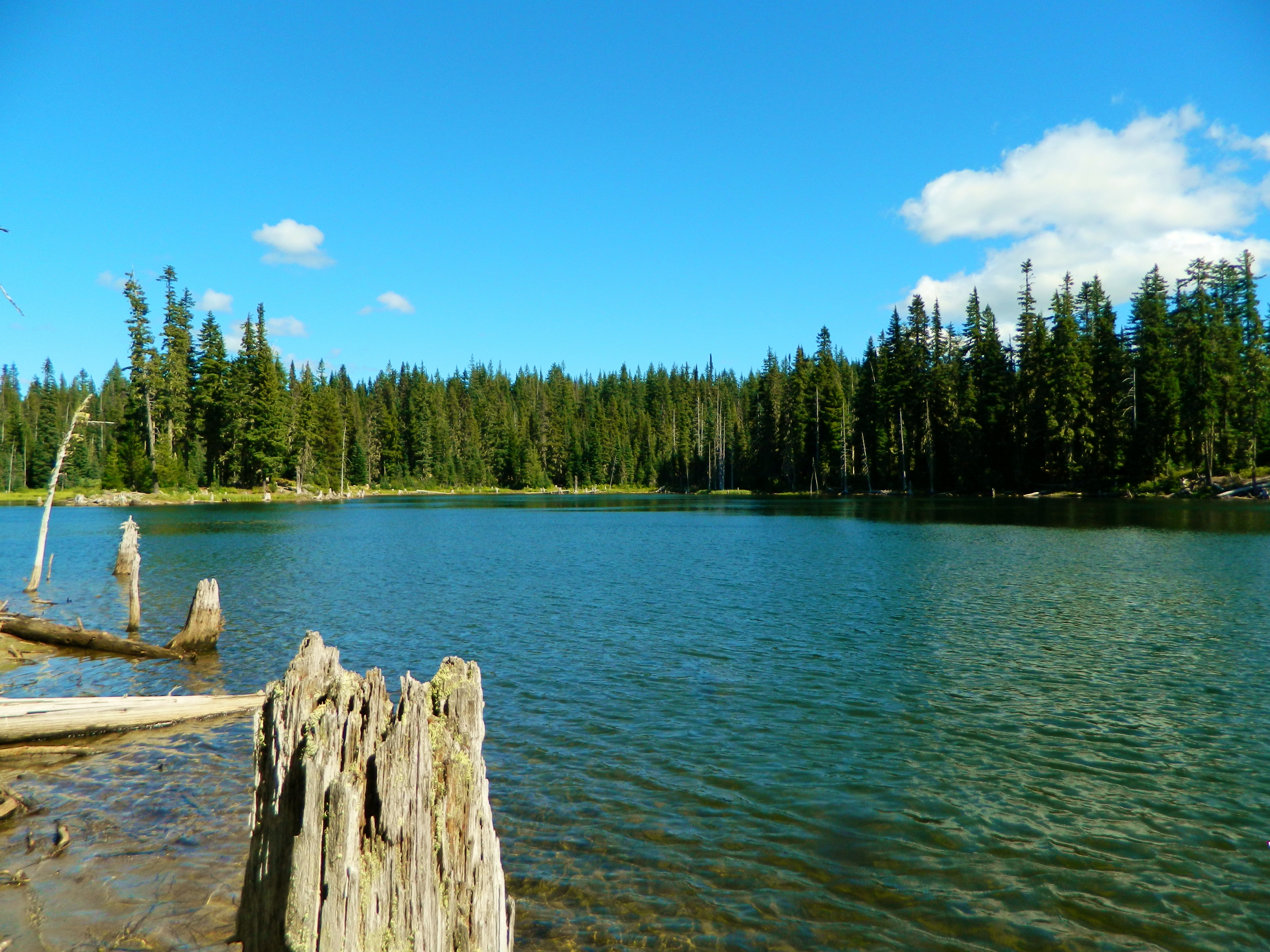

- Location within Washington (state) Location within the United States
- Location: Skamania County, Washington, United States
- Coordinates: 46°18′31″N 121°34′10″W
- Lake type: natural
- Primary inflows: seasonal tributary of Spring Creek, snowmelt/runoff
- Primary outflows: evaporation and seepage
- Basin countries: United States
- Max. length: 1,761 ft (537 m)
- Max. width: 1,141 ft (348 m)
- Surface area: 25 acres (10 ha)
- Surface elevation: 4,144 ft (1,263 m)
- Islands: one small island separated by a narrow isthmus

Horseshoe Lake is a lake situated in the east side of the Midway High Lakes Area below Mount Adams's northwest flank. The lake is popular for camping, quiet boating (electric motors or canoeing), hiking, and biking on a trail halfway around the lake. Other activities include scenic viewing and fishing. The lake offers an eleven-site campground, administered by the Gifford Pinchot National Forest in the State of Washington.

== Recreation ==
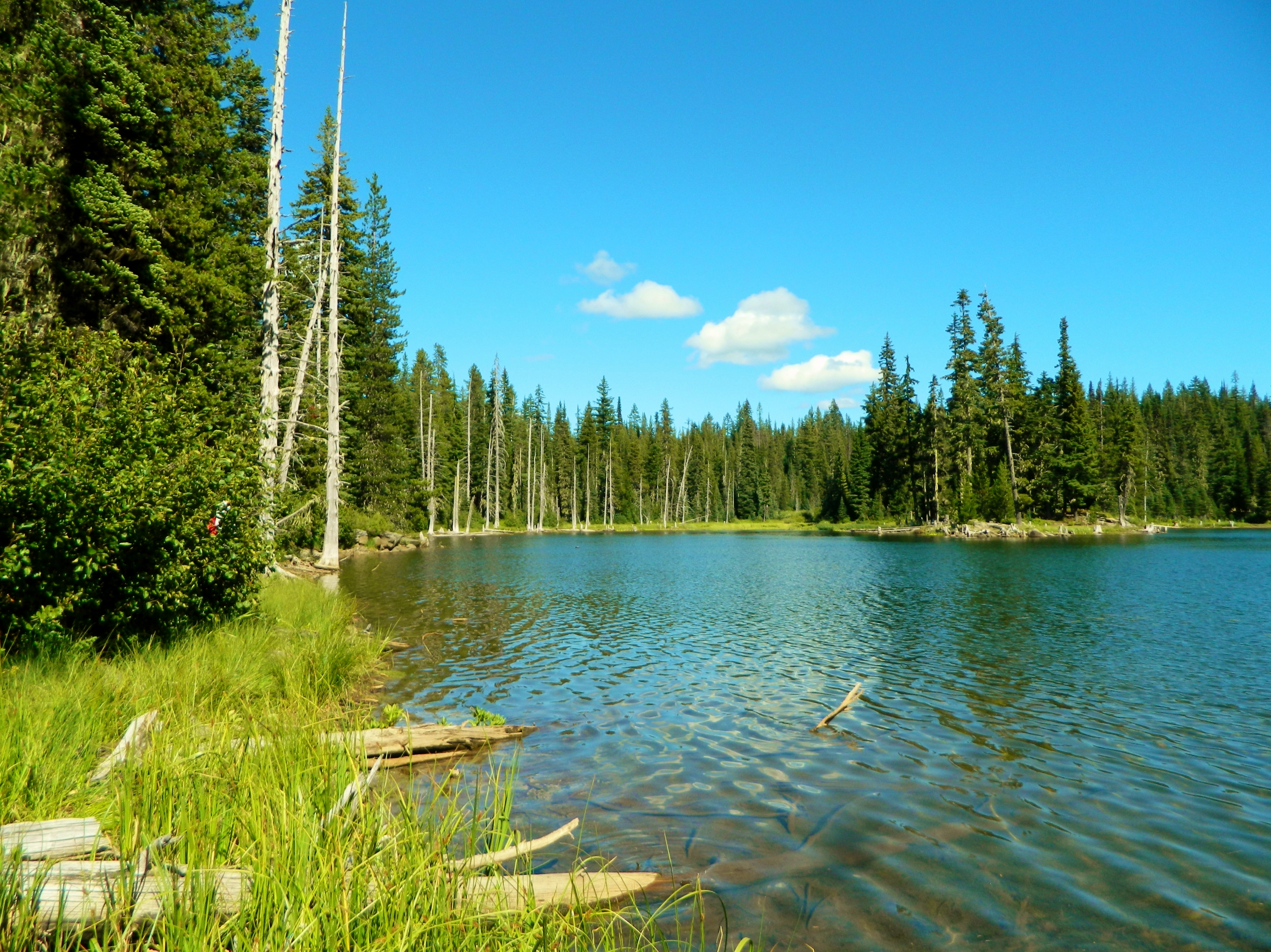
Sunny Shore of Horseshoe Lake

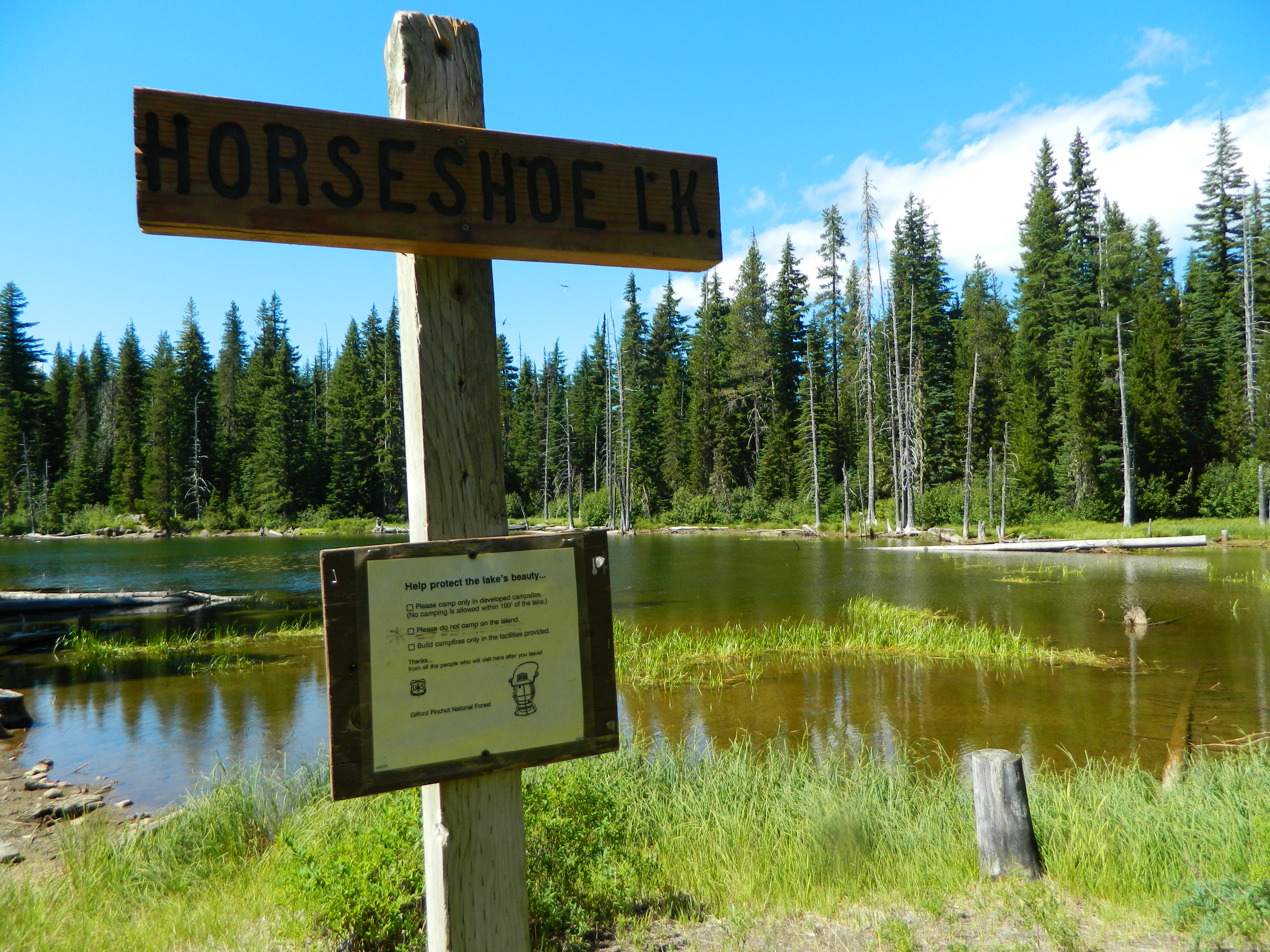
Peninsula Trail and Lake Sign

The lake is popular for fishing, camping, and boating, and often clearly reflects Mount Adams. Adjacent Horseshoe Lake Campground is administered by the Cowlitz Ranger District of the Gifford Pinchot National Forest. The popular eleven-site campground features the Green Mountain Trail, which halfway circles the lake, offering more views of the mountain, and up to the top of Green Mountain, offering outstanding views of Mount Adams and its sheer, glaciated northwest face as well as Adams Glacier, the second largest glacier in the contiguous United States. The lake is a popular summer destination, and can be accessed via Primary Road 23, to Road 5601, and Road 2329 from Trout Lake at the southern side of Mount Adams. From Randle or Packwood in the north, it can be accessed via Primary Road 23, to Road 5601, and 2329, or alternately from Packwood on Primary Road 21 to Road 2329. The loop from Packwood to Takhlakh Lake, Horseshoe Lake, and the surrounding Midway High Lakes, along the scenic Cispus River to Randle, and back to Packwood along US Route 12 makes up the High Lakes Loop (Scenic Driving) from the White Pass Scenic Byway.

== See also ==
- Gifford Pinchot National Forest
- Midway High Lakes Area
- List of lakes of Washington (state)
