= Big Spring Creek =

Big Spring Creek may refer to:

- Big Spring Creek (Montana)
- Big Spring Creek (Pennsylvania)
- Big Spring Creek Falls, a three-tiered waterfall along Big Spring Creek, originating high on Mount Adams, Washington
