= Wilson Glacier (Mount Adams) =

Glacier in the state of Washington

- Location within Washington (state) Location within the United States
- Type: Mountain glacier
- Location: Mount Adams, Yakima County, Washington, USA
- Coordinates: 46°12′45″N 121°28′00″W
- Area: 1.03 km^{2} (0.40 sq mi) in 2006
- Length: 0.85 mi (1.37 km)
- Terminus: Talus
- Status: Retreating

Wilson Glacier is located on the east slopes of Mount Adams, a stratovolcano in the U.S. state of Washington. The glacier is within the Yakama Indian Reservation. The glacier descends from approximately 10,600 ft (3,200 m) to a terminus near 7,400 ft (2,300 m). Wilson Glacier has been in a general state of retreat for over 100 years and lost 14 percent of its surface area between 1904 and 2006.

== History ==
Following his survey of Adams' glaciers, Harry Fielding Reid gave the glacier the name Little Muddy Glacier in his publication in the 1906 Annals of Glaciology. In an earlier publication in the Mazamas club journal he had left it unnamed. The present name of Wilson Glacier was given by Claude Ewing Rusk to honor President Woodrow Wilson for being the president during World War I. He also named the ridge that splits the glacier in half Roosevelt Cliff to honor his conservation hero and former President, Theodore Roosevelt. This name was later moved to the cliffs above the Rusk and Wilson Glaciers.

== See also ==
- List of glaciers in the United States
