= Babyshoe Falls =

Waterfall in Washington (state), United States

- Interactive map of Babyshoe Falls
- Location: Midway High Lakes Area, Skamania County, Washington, United States
- Coordinates: 46.25731°N 121.61433°W
- Type: Tiered Horsetails
- Elevation: 4,046 ft (1,233 m)
- Total height: 200 ft (61 m)
- Number of drops: 2
- Longest drop: 130 ft (40 m)
- Total width: ~10
- Average width: 10 ft (3 m)
- Watercourse: Unnamed (Part of the Lewis River Watershed)
- Average flow rate: 5 cu ft/s (0.14 m^{3}/s)

Babyshoe Falls drops 200 feet (61 m), with a main drop of 130 feet (40 m), in Babyshoe Pass. It is on an intermittent stream that drains a small marsh (0.25 square mile) on the south side of Babyshoe Pass, at an elevation of 4,046 feet (1,233 m). It is located in the Midway High Lakes Area northwest of Mount Adams, in the Gifford Pinchot National Forest of Washington state. The falls are seasonal, typically drying up in the summer, but starting to flow again after periods of prolonged rainfall or snow melt.

== Sources ==
- http://www.waterfallsnorthwest.com/nws/waterfall.php?st=&num=746
