= Lyman Glacier (Mount Adams) =

Glacier in Washington, United States

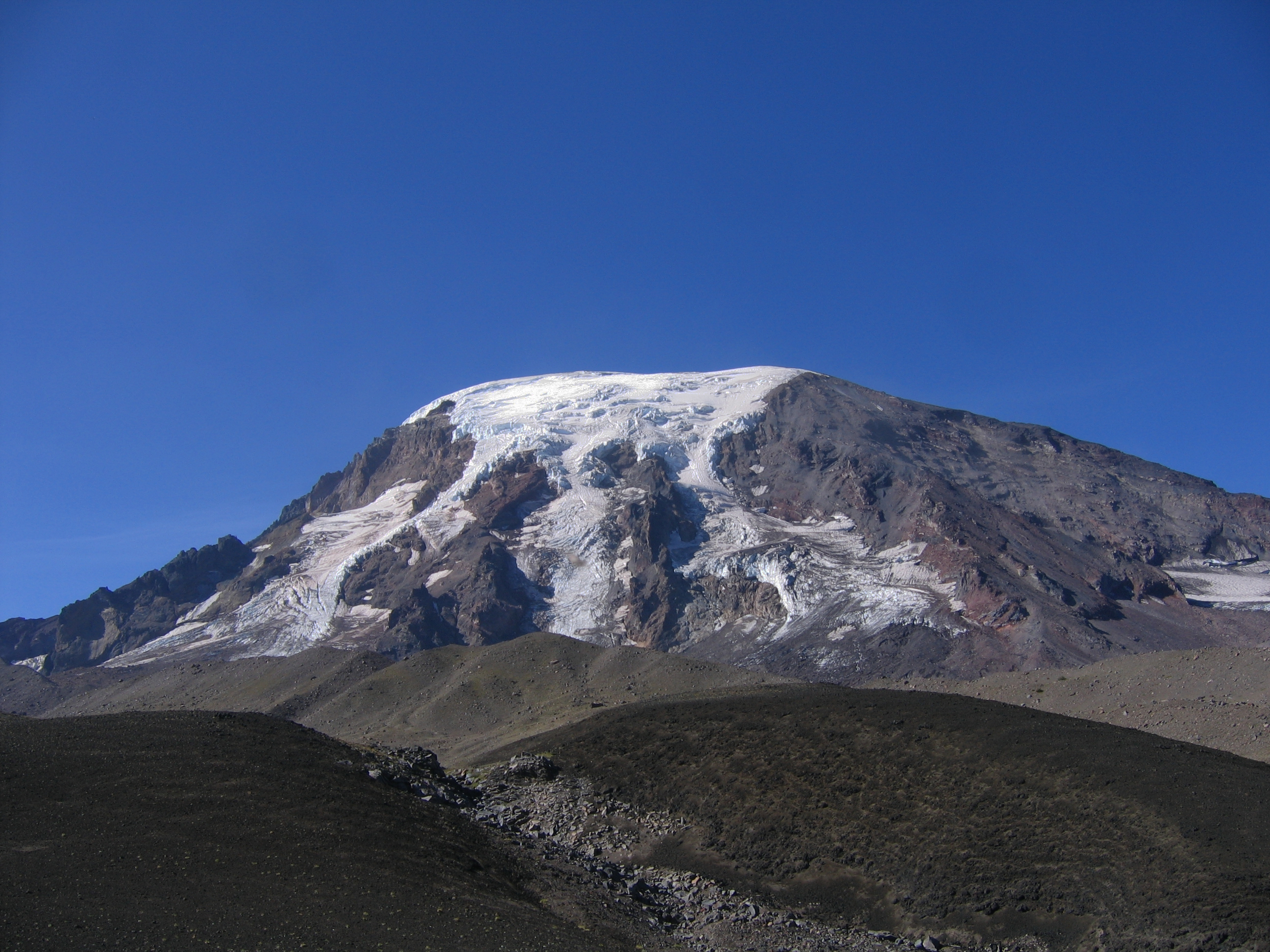
- Lyman Glacier cascading down from the summit of Mount Adams

- Location within Washington (state) Location within the United States
- Type: Mountain glacier
- Location: Mount Adams, Yakima County, Washington, USA
- Coordinates: 46°12′58″N 121°29′03″W
- Area: 1.62 km^{2} (0.63 sq mi) in 2006
- Length: 1.4 mi (2.3 km)
- Terminus: Talus
- Status: Retreating

Lyman Glacier is located on the north slopes of Mount Adams a stratovolcano in Gifford Pinchot National Forest in the U.S. state of Washington. The glacier is also within the Yakama Indian Reservation and descends from near the summit of Mount Adams at approximately 11,400 ft (3,500 m) to a terminus near 7,800 ft (2,400 m). Below 9,000 ft (2,700 m) the glacier splits into three distinct lobes. Lyman Glacier has been in a general state of retreat for over 100 years and lost 34 percent of its surface area between 1904 and 2006.

Lyman Glacier was named after William Denison Lyman by Claude Ewing Rusk because Lyman was one of the first to describe some of Mount Adams' features and history.

== See also ==
- List of glaciers in the United States
