= Big Spring Creek Falls =

Waterfall in Washington (state), United States

- Interactive map of Big Spring Creek Falls
- Location: Midway High Lakes Area, Skamania County, Washington, United States
- Coordinates: 46.23187°N 121.62483°W
- Type: Tiered Plunges
- Elevation: 3,598 ft (1,097 m)
- Total height: 49 ft (15 m)
- Number of drops: 3
- Longest drop: 25 ft (8 m)
- Total width: ~10
- Average width: 10 ft (3 m)
- Watercourse: Big Spring Creek
- Average flow rate: 40 cu ft/s (1.1 m^{3}/s)

Big Spring Creek Falls is a three-tiered waterfall along Big Spring Creek, originating high on Mount Adams, with a total height of 49 ft (15 m). Its main drop is 25 ft (8 m) feet. It cascades down among a dark forest, surrounded by mosses and ferns. The falls are located within eyesight of Forest Route 23, and is a popular stop for travelers passing by, heading to the Midway High Lakes Area and Takhlakh Lake from Trout Lake or the Lewis River. The falls is managed by the Gifford Pinchot National Forest.

== See also ==
- Waterfalls
- Midway High Lakes Area
