= Chocolate Glacier =

Glacier in Washington, United States

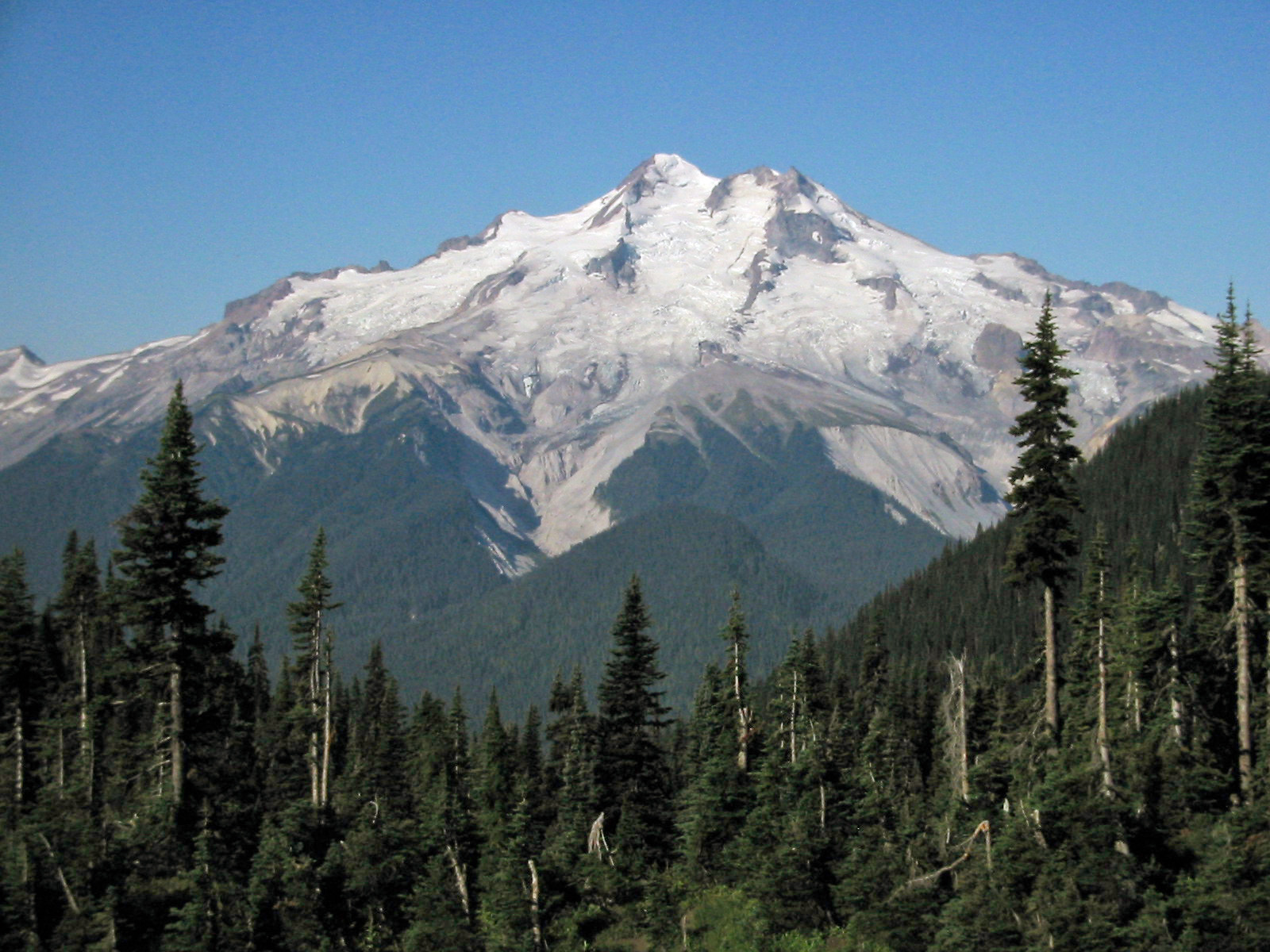
- Left to right, Cool, Chocolate, North Guardian and Dusty Glaciers on the east slopes of Glacier Peak

- Location within Washington (state)
- Type: Mountain glacier
- Location: Glacier Peak, Snohomish County, Washington, USA
- Coordinates: 48°07′01″N 121°05′04″W
- Length: 1.9 mi (3.1 km)
- Terminus: Talus
- Status: Retreating

Chocolate Glacier is located on east slopes of Glacier Peak in the U.S. state of Washington. The glacier descends from 10,400 ft (3,200 m) to 5,900 ft (1,800 m) and is partially connected to Cool Glacier which lies to its south just below the summit of Glacier Peak. As is true with all the glaciers found on Glacier Peak, Chocolate Glacier is retreating. Chocolate Glacier retreated approximately 1,380 m (4,530 ft) between 1906 and 1946, however during a cooler and wetter period from about 1950 to 1979, the glacier advanced 450 m (1,480 ft). Chocolate Glacier has resumed retreating since and has given back 350 m (1,150 ft), nearing its previously recorded minimal length. The current terminus at 1800 m is still the lowest of the east side glacier. Chocolate Glacier remains heavily crevassed and active to 1900 m. The lowest 300 m of the glacier are stagnant.

The Chocolate Glacier was given its name in 1906 by mountaineer Claude Ewing Rusk, who commented on the chocolate colored water flowing from the glacier terminus.

== See also ==
- List of glaciers in the United States
