= Cool Glacier =

Glacier in Washington, United States

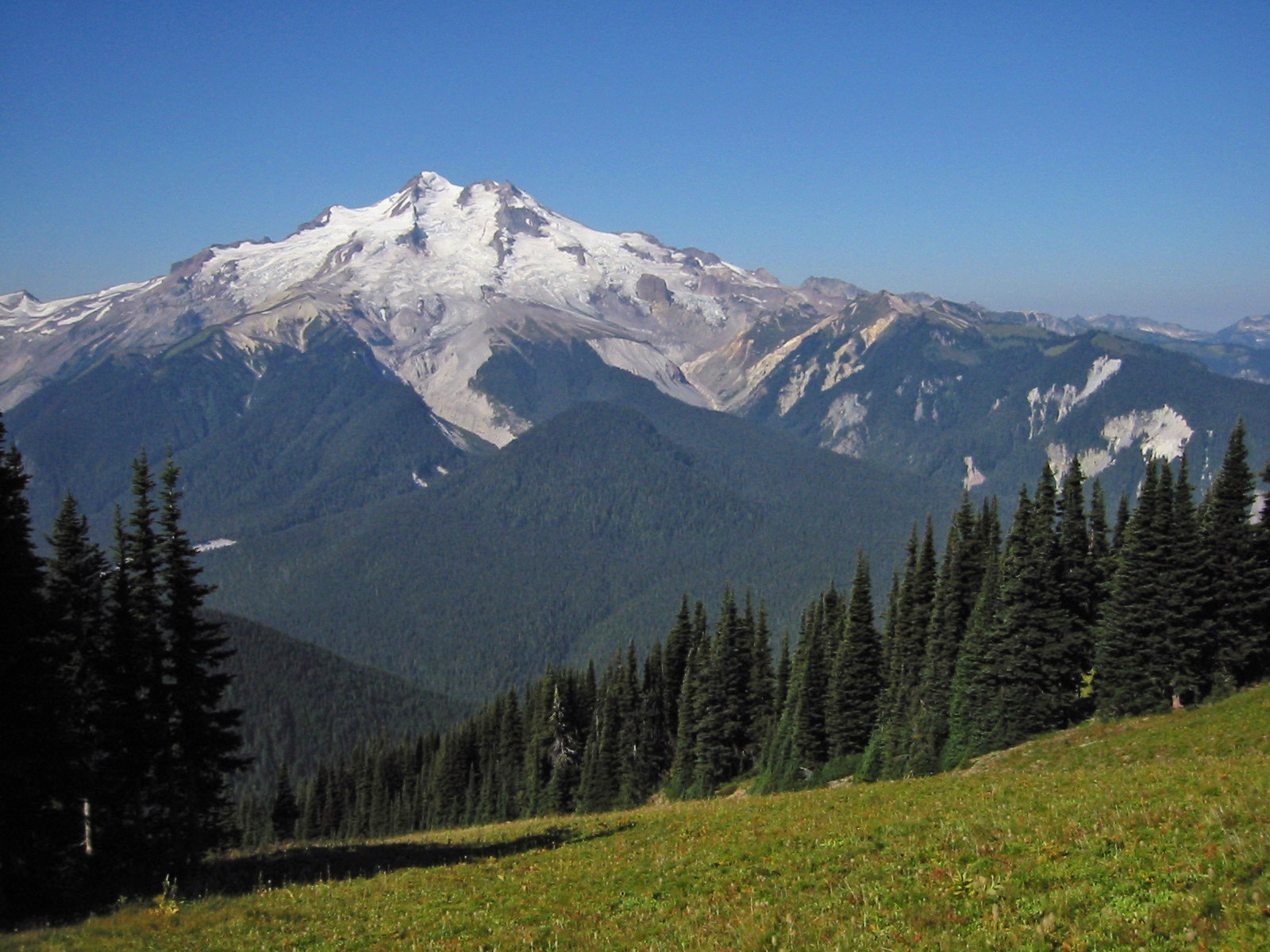
- Left to right, Cool, Chocolate, North Guardian and Dusty Glaciers on the east slopes of Glacier Peak

- Location within Washington (state)
- Type: Mountain glacier
- Location: Glacier Peak, Snohomish County, Washington, USA
- Coordinates: 48°06′28″N 121°06′07″W
- Length: 1.3 mi (2.1 km)
- Terminus: Barren
- Status: Retreating

Cool Glacier is located on east slopes of Glacier Peak in the U.S. state of Washington. The glacier descends from 10,200 ft (3,100 m) to 6,900 ft (2,100 m) and is partially connected to Chocolate Glacier which lies to its north just below the summit of Glacier Peak. As is true with all the glaciers found on Glacier Peak, Cool Glacier is retreating. Cool Glacier retreated approximately 1,500 m (4,900 ft) between 1850 and 1946, however during a cooler and wetter period from about 1950 to 1979, the glacier advanced. Since then Cool Glacier resumed retreating and by 2005 the glacier was within 40 m (130 ft) of its minimum length recorded in 1946.

The Cool Glacier was given its name in 1906 by mountaineer Claude Ewing Rusk for his climbing companion A.L. Cool.

== See also ==
- List of glaciers in the United States
