= Midway High Lakes Area =

Protected area in Washington State, US

Takhlakh Lake
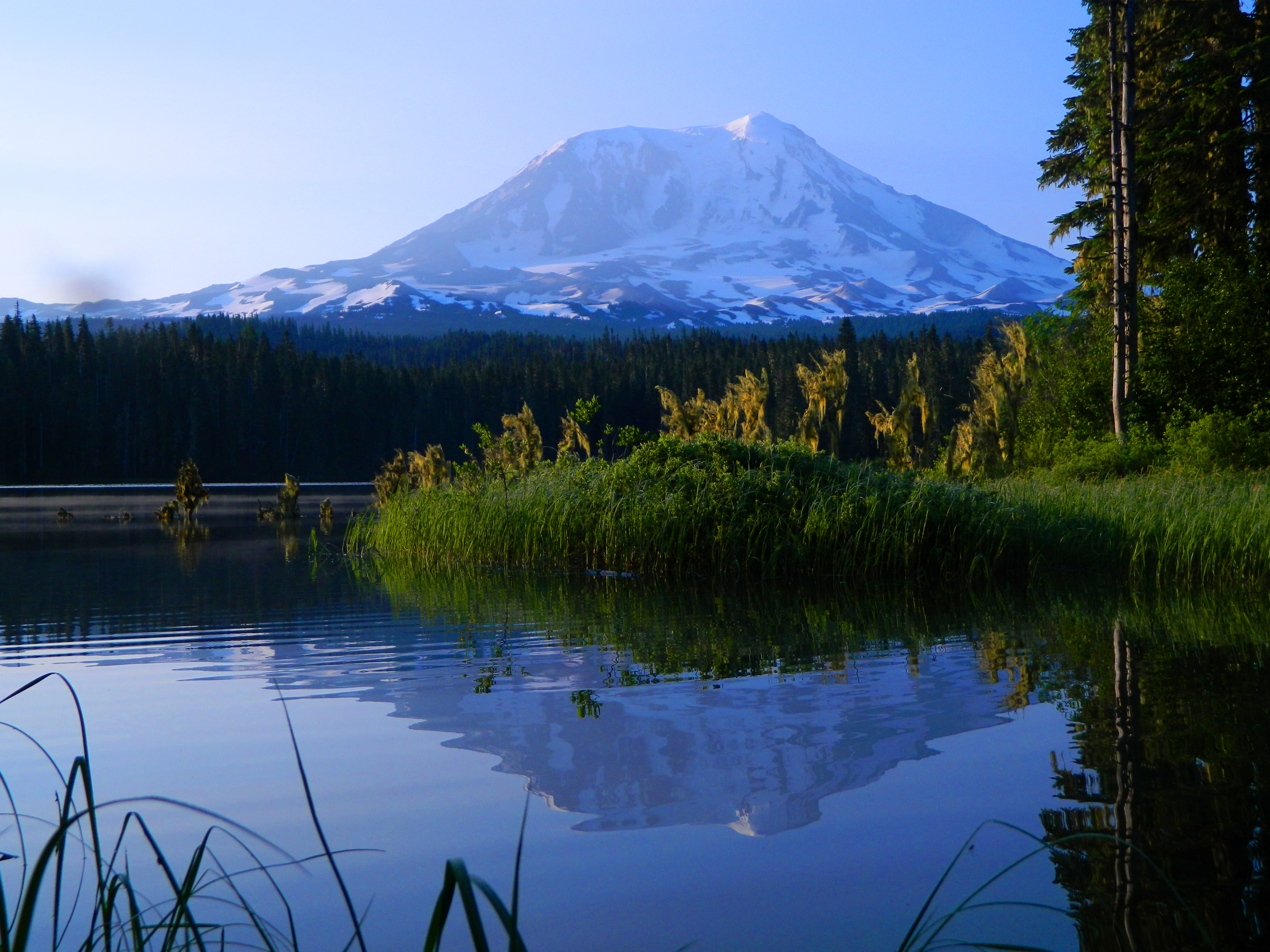
- Mount Adams seen from picturesque Takhlakh Lake

- Location within Washington (state) Location within the United States
- Location: Skamania County, Washington, United States
- Coordinates: 46°16′39″N 121°35′46″W
- Type: natural
- Primary inflows: unnamed inflow creeks
- Primary outflows: Canyon Creek (Tributary)
- Catchment area: 0.70295 sq mi (1.8206 km^{2})
- Basin countries: United States
- Max. length: 1,788 ft (545 m)
- Max. width: 1,129 ft (344 m)
- Surface area: 33 acres (13 ha)
- Surface elevation: 4,390 ft (1,340 m)
- Islands: 0
- Settlements: (none)

Midway High Lakes Area, also known as High Lakes Area, is a United States Forest Service–designated area located in Washington’s Cascade Mountains. It lies on a high plateau on Mount Adams' northwestern flank. It is between the Goat Rocks on the north and Mount Hood to the south and contains Takhlakh Lake along with several other lakes. The area offers five scenic high elevation lakes all within a seven-mile (11 km) radius. It is administered by the Gifford Pinchot National Forest. While even the most visited areas at Mount Adams pale in comparison to nearby St. Helens or Rainier, it is by its own standards one of the most popular recreational areas around Mount Adams. Some of the lakes offers photogenic views of Mount Adams from across the lake.

== Geography ==
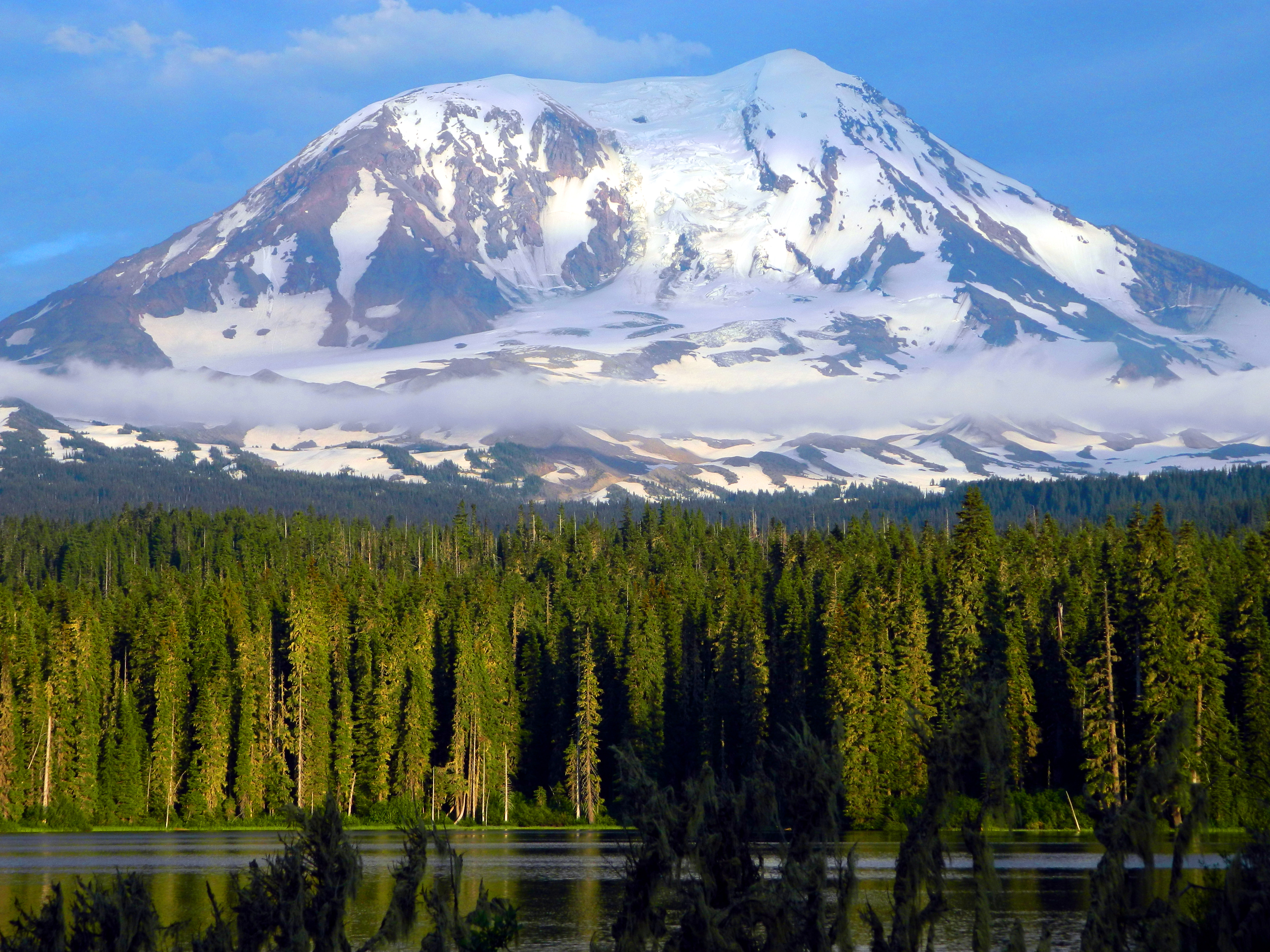
Adams Glacier cascades down the northwest face of Mount Adams in a series of icefalls, viewed from Takhlakh Lake.

The Midway High Lakes Area lies below the volcanic peak of 12,276 feet (3,742 m) Mount Adams, and Adams Glacier cascading from the summit in a series of icefalls. It is the second largest glacier in the State of Washington, after Carbon Glacier on Mount Rainier. The area is characterized by several volcanic features in addition to Mount Adams, such as the Takh Takh Lava Flow, the Muddy Fork Lava Flows, and Potato Hill, a small 200-foot (61 m) tall cinder cone below the Muddy Fork Lava Flows. There are some meadows and marshes, with Takh Takh Meadows being the most well known. Muddy Meadows is another named meadow in the High Lakes Area, near Riley Horse Camp and Muddy Meadows Trail accessing the Pacific Crest Trail and the Mount Adams Wilderness.

=== Major lakes ===
The table below lists the five major lakes within the Midway High Lakes Area.

	Lake	Surface Area	Elevation
1	Takhlakh Lake	33 acres (13 ha)	4,390 ft (1,340 m)
2	Olallie Lake	15.8 acres (6.4 ha)	4,242 ft (1,293 m)
3	Council Lake	43.7 acres (17.7 ha)	4,221 ft (1,287 m)
4	Horseshoe Lake	25 acres (10 ha)	4,140 ft (1,260 m)
5	Chain of Lakes	(All 12 small lakes) ~26.3 acres (10.6 ha)	~4,395 ft (1,340 m)
6	Green Mountain Lake	2.5 acres (1.0 ha)	4,042 ft (1,232 m)

== Recreation ==
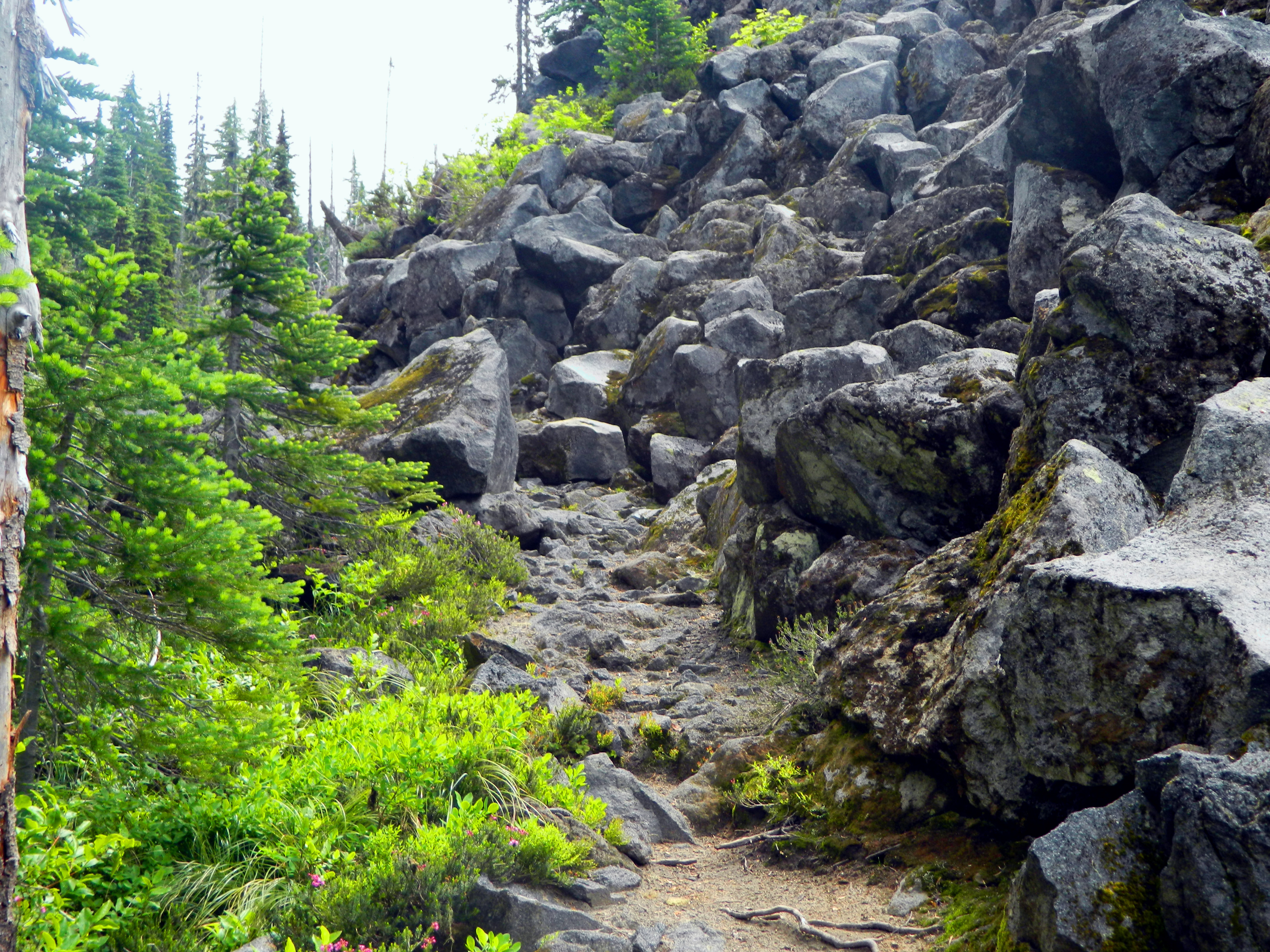
Trail along the Takh Takh Lava Flow, accessed from trails originating at Takhlakh Lake Campground

The High Lakes Area includes several lakes offering hiking, backpacking, fishing, non-motorized boating and canoeing, scenic driving, and developed and primitive camping experiences. The area offers several campgrounds including the popular Takhlakh Lake Campground. Other campgrounds are Olallie Lake Campground, Horseshoe Lake Campground, Killen Creek Campground, Council Lake Campground, Chain of Lakes Campground, Cat Creek Campground, Twin Falls Campground, and Adams Fork Campground. The popular and developed Walupt Lake Campground is also nearby, northeast of the Midway High Lakes Area at the southwestern base of the Goat Rocks. The area is the highlight of the 79-mile (127 km) High Lakes Loop, a scenic driving loop in the White Pass National Scenic Byway beginning at Randle.

There are several waterfalls nearby, including Twin Falls, Steamboat Falls, Babyshoe Falls, Big Spring Creek Falls, and Riley Creek Falls.

== In media ==
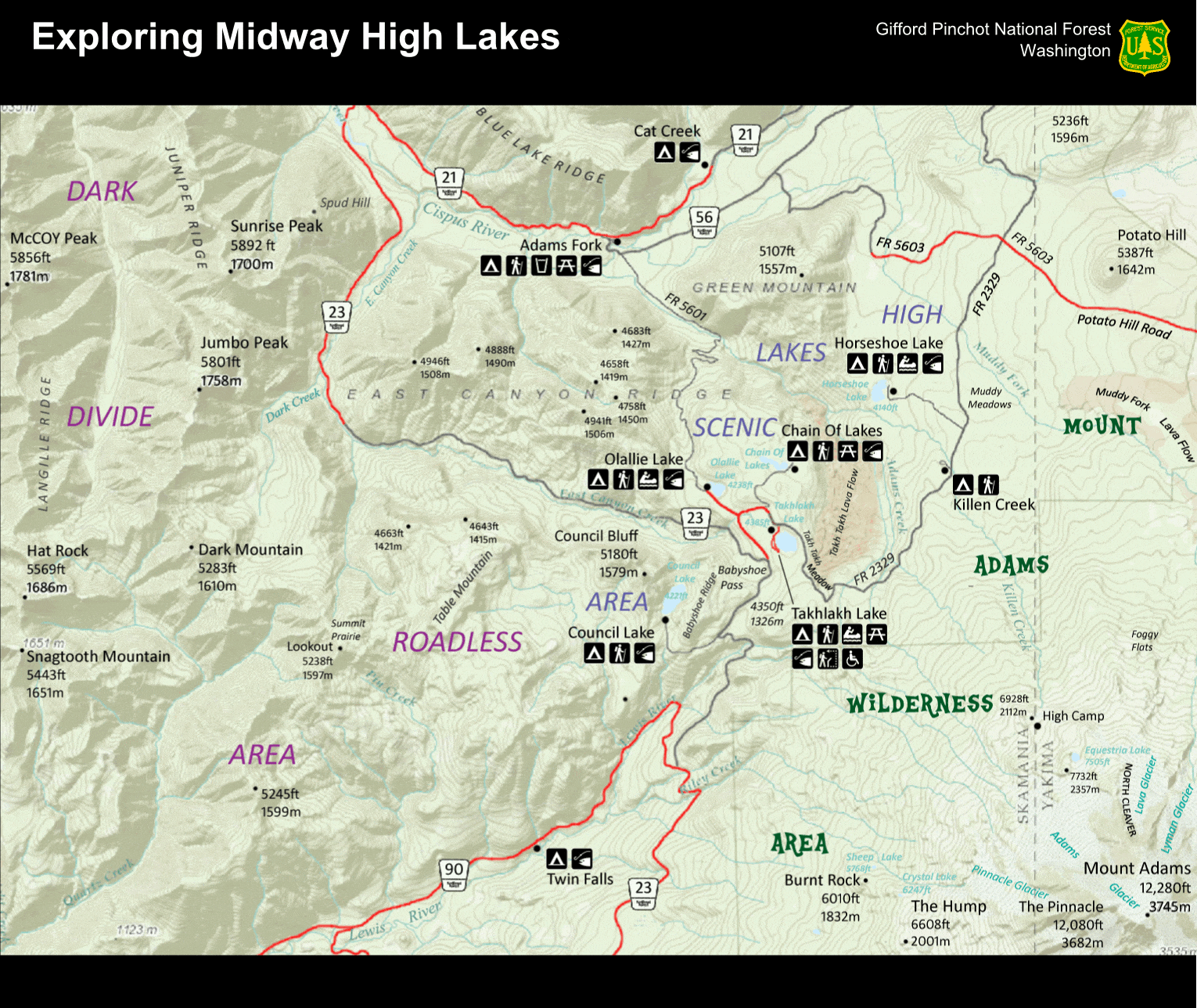
Map showing the Mount Adams Midway High Lakes Area

- In 1989, National Geographic featured a photograph showing vacationers playing at Takhlakh Lake. The photo was taken by James P. Blair for, but not published in, "Old Growth Forests: Will We Save Our Own?," September 1990, National Geographic magazine)
- In 2013, National Geographic featured Takhklakh Lake in a photograph titled: "Mount Adams reflected in Takhlakh Lake". It was one of the twenty places in the world chosen for National Geographic's Must-Do Trips, called "Ultimate Adventure Bucket List 2013". The post was entitled as "Must-Do Trip: Hike Around Mount Adams, Washington". The photo was taken by Randall J. Hodges, from Getty Images. In it, she recommends the 35-mile (56 km) circumnavigation of Mount Adams on a route hiking on several trails: the Highline, the Round the Mountain, and others (such as a portion of the Pacific Crest Trail); and includes some off-trail hiking at the east side of the mountain.

== See also ==
- Gifford Pinchot National Forest
- List of lakes in Washington (state)
- Mount Adams
