= William Denison Lyman =

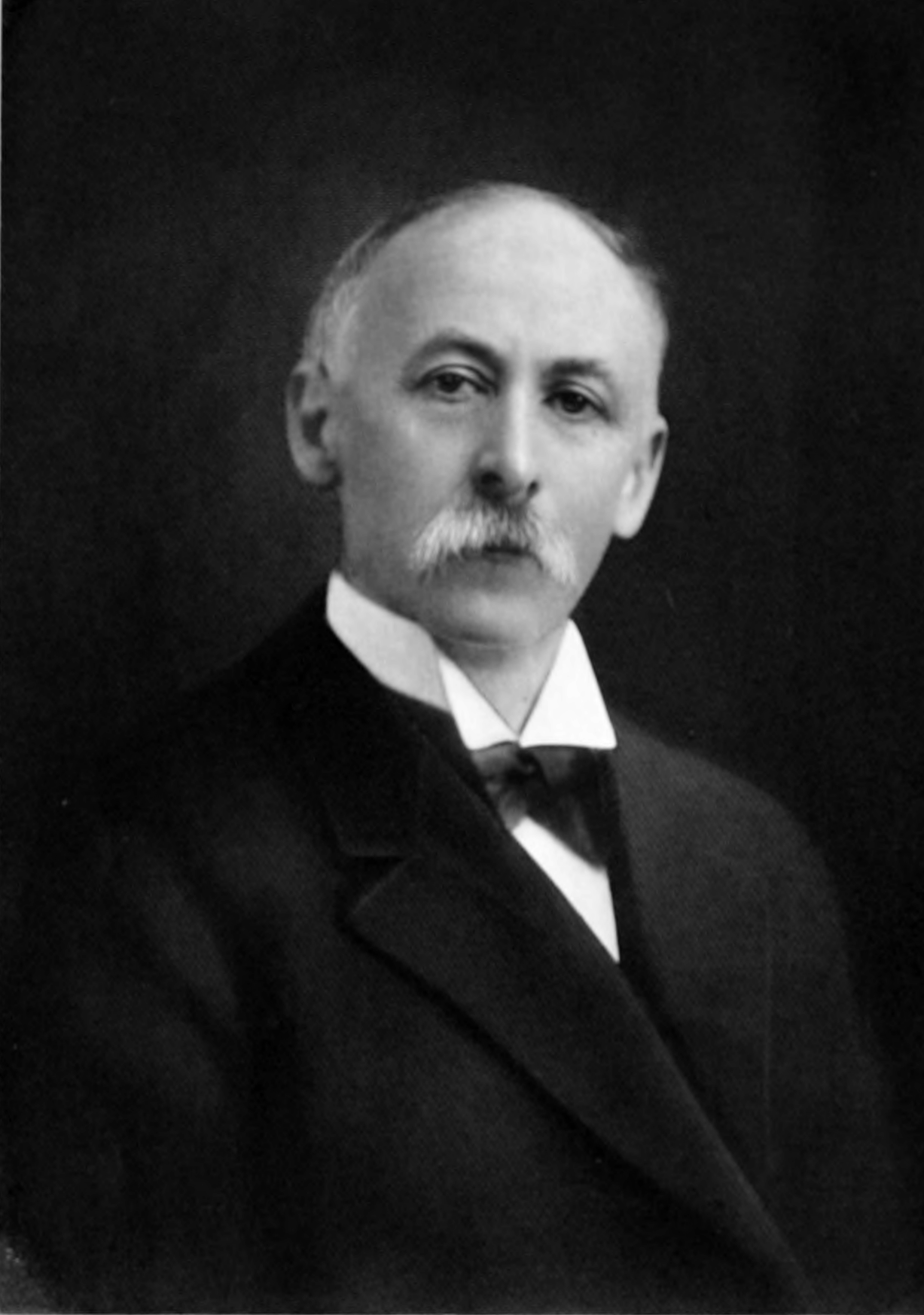
- Born: December 1, 1852; Portland, Oregon
- Died: June 21, 1920 (aged 67); Walla Walla, Washington

William Denison Lyman (December 1, 1852 – June 21, 1920) was an author, professor, and historian.

== Biography ==
Lyman studied at Tualatin Academy and Pacific University, graduating from the Pacific scientific course in 1873. He received a degree from Williams College in 1877.

After an attempt at farming and teaching at the University of New Mexico at Santa Fe, Lyman taught history and served as department head at Whitman College from 1888 until his death in 1920. Just before his death he became Professor Emeritus at the college. In 1890 and 1891 he went to Spokane to try to bootstap a new college. Lyman contributed published papers to the American Antiquarian Society. He also published several books, notably about the history of Walla Walla, Washington and the significance of The Columbia River.

Lyman climbed and documented many peaks in the Pacific Northwest.

== Legacy ==
Lyman House at Whitman College is named in his honor, as are the Lyman Glaciers on Mount Adams and in the North Cascades.

== Bibliography ==
- An illustrated history of Walla Walla County, State of Washington (1901)
- Lyman's History of old Walla Walla County, volumes 1 and 2 (1901)
- County of Walla Walla, Washington souvenir booklet, (1905)
- History of Snohomish and Skagit Counties (1906)
- The Columbia River: Its History, Its Myths, Its Scenery, Its Commerce by Lyman (1909)
- History of the Yakima Valley (1919)
