= Rusk Glacier =

Glacier in the state of Washington

- Location within Washington (state) Location within the United States
- Type: Mountain glacier
- Location: Mount Adams, Yakima County, Washington, USA
- Coordinates: 46°12′17″N 121°28′04″W
- Area: 1.47 km^{2} (0.57 sq mi) in 2006
- Length: 1 mi (1.6 km)
- Terminus: Talus
- Status: Retreating

Rusk Glacier is located on the eastern face of Mount Adams in the U.S. state of Washington. Starting at an elevation of over 10,200 ft (3,100 m) at just below The Castle, the glacier flows eastward down slope. A significant portion of the glacier is covered by rock debris and in the middle of the glacier, at about 9,200 ft (2,800 m), there is a small ice-free island of rock. The glacier terminates at about 7,500 ft (2,300 m) at its rock-covered moraine. The glacier has decreased in surface area by 23 percent between 1904 and 2006.

== History ==
The glacier was named for Claude Ewing Rusk, who made the first ascent of The Castle in 1921, by Harry Fielding Reid.

== See also ==
- List of glaciers in the United States
