= Takhlakh Lake =

Lake in the U.S. state of Washington

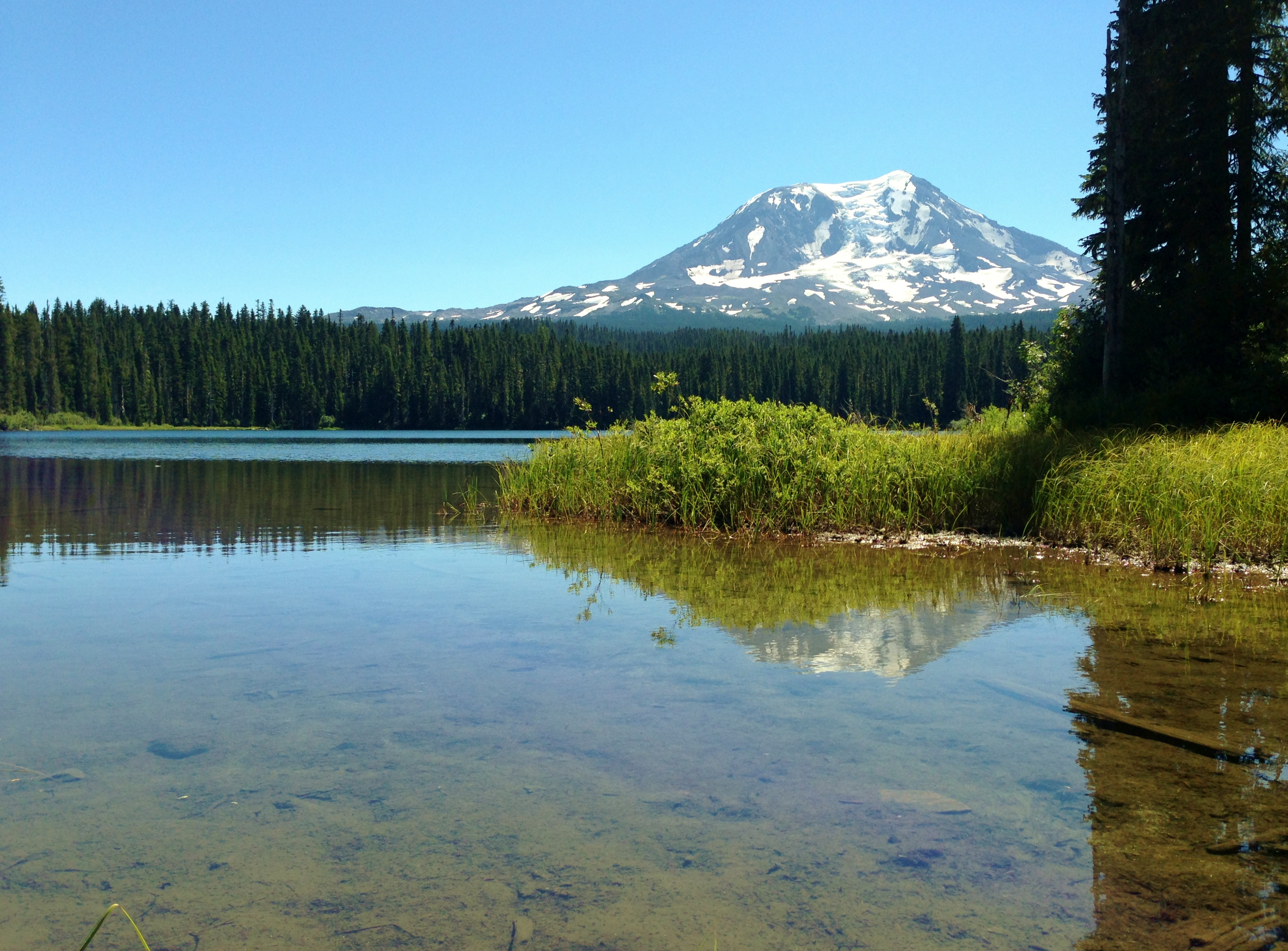
- Mount Adams seen from the lake

- Location within Washington (state) Location within the United States
- Location: Skamania County, Washington, United States
- Coordinates: 46°16′39″N 121°35′46″W
- Lake type: natural
- Primary inflows: unnamed inflow creeks
- Primary outflows: Canyon Creek (Tributary)
- Catchment area: 0.70295 sq mi (1.8206 km^{2})
- Basin countries: United States
- Max. length: 1,788 ft (545 m)
- Max. width: 1,129 ft (344 m)
- Surface area: 33 acres (13 ha)
- Surface elevation: 4,390 ft (1,340 m)
- Islands: 0

Takhlakh Lake is a lake situated 7.3 miles (11.7 km) northwest of Mount Adams in the U.S. state of Washington. It is fed by a few small unnamed inflow creeks originating near Takh Takh Meadows, tributary to the Cispus River. A popular 53-site campground on the west side of the lake brings summer and early fall campers as well as hikers hiking the Takhlakh Loop Trail and the Takh Takh Meadows Trail, and nearby trails in the Mount Adams Wilderness. A day use area offers a picnic area and provides a boat ramp as well. The lake is one of the five lakes, all within a seven-mile radius, in the Midway High Lakes Area. It is managed by the Gifford Pinchot National Forest.

== History ==
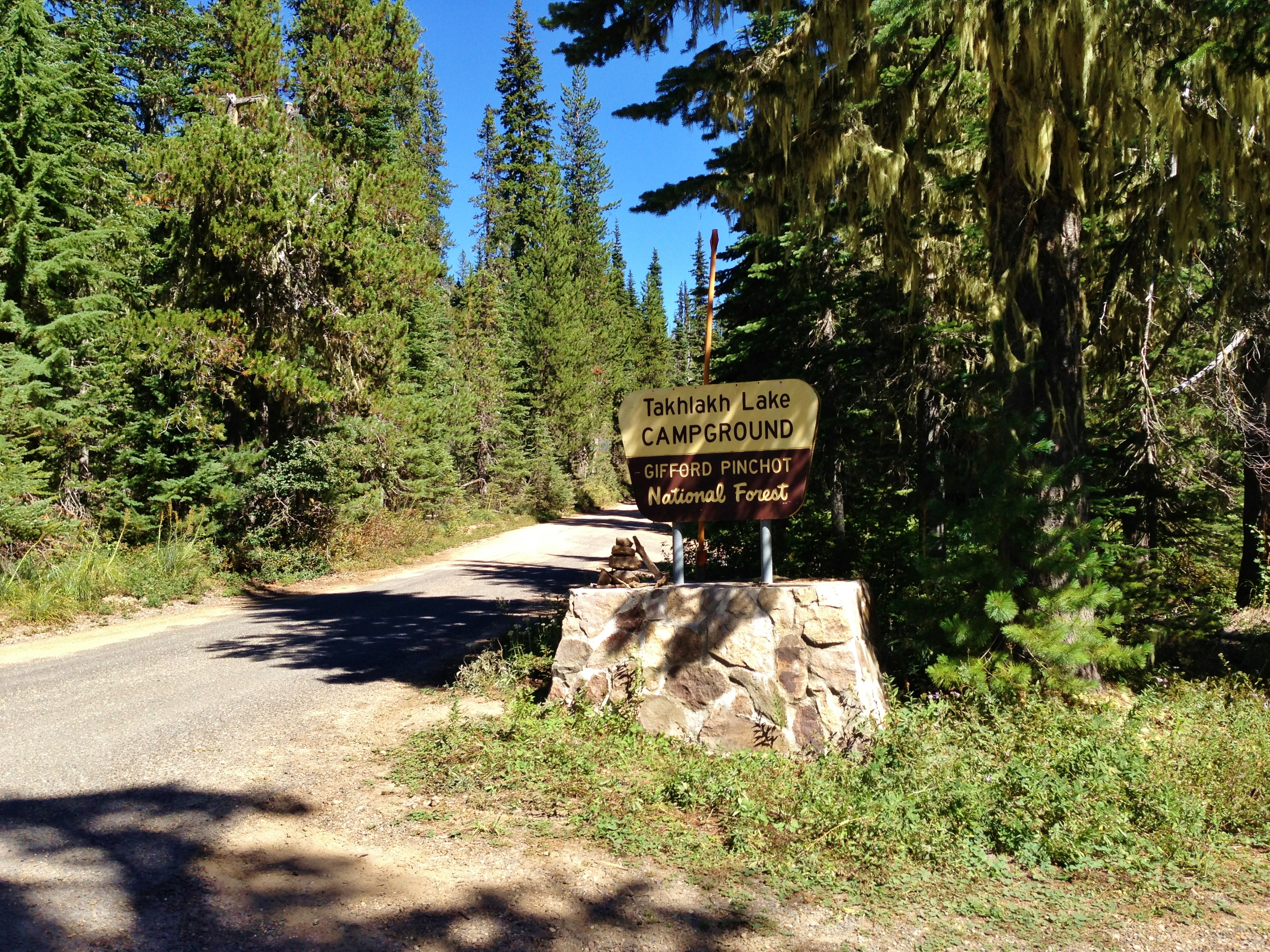
Takhlakh Lake Campground Sign

The name Takhlakh comes from a Native American word "takh", which means meadows. Takh Takh Meadows was also named after this word, since flowers are particularly abundant in and around the Takh Takh Lava Flow area.

== Recreation ==
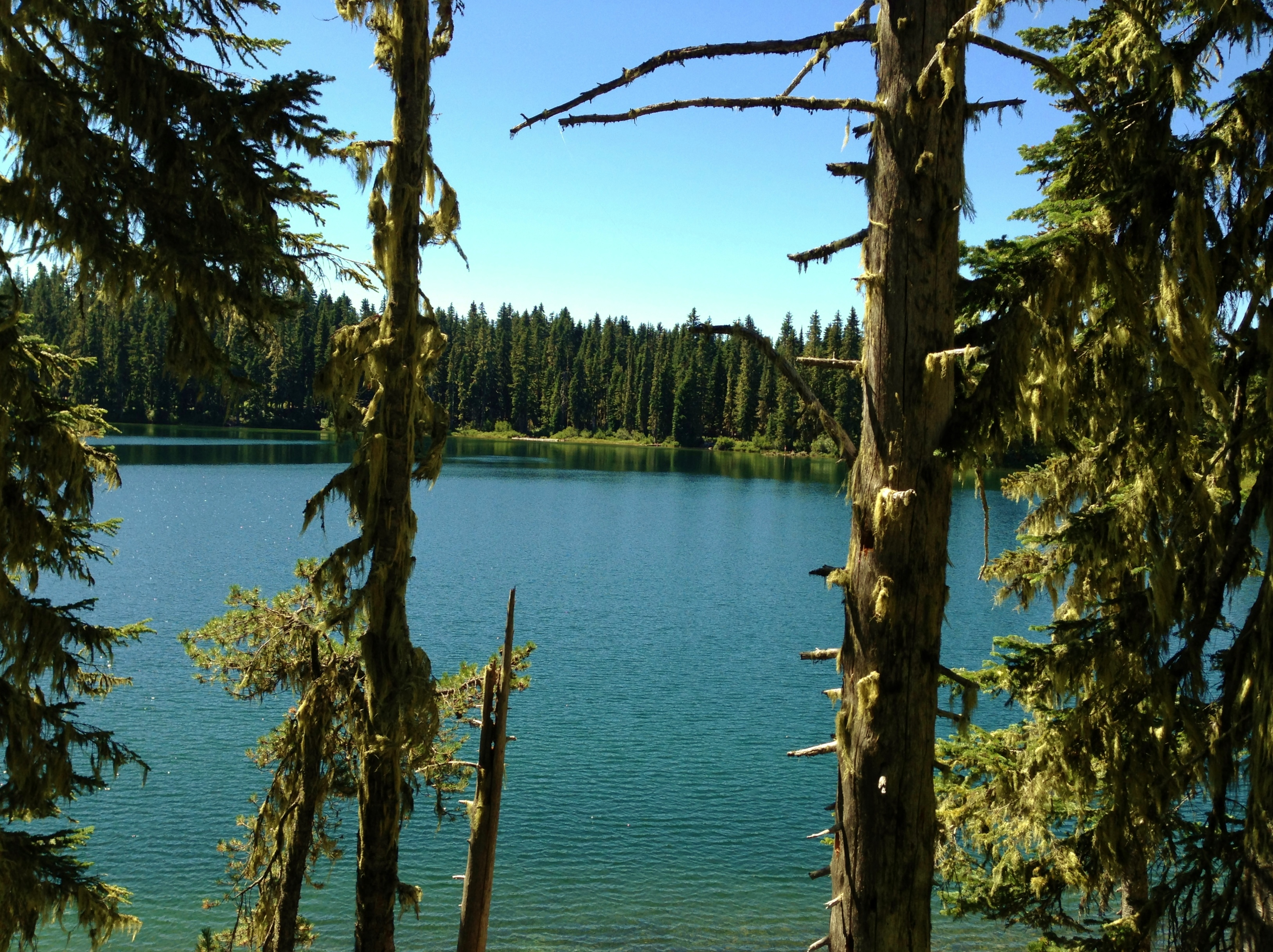
Takhlakh Lake between the Trees

The lake is popular for fishing, camping, and photography, often clearly reflecting Mount Adams. Adjacent Takhlakh Lake Campground is administered by the Cowlitz Ranger District of the Gifford Pinchot National Forest. The popular campground features a boat ramp and wheelchair-accessible Takhlakh Loop Trail #134, which encircles the lake, offering more views of the mountain, and accesses the Takh Takh Meadows Interpretive Trail #136 (foot only) that climbs up into the edge of the Takh Takh Lava Flow and Takh Takh Meadows, offering outstanding views of Mount Adams and its sheer, glaciated northwest face as well as Adams Glacier, the second largest glacier in the contiguous United States. The lake is a very popular summer destination, and can be accessed via Primary Road 23, to Road 5601, and Road 2329 from Trout Lake at the southern side of Mount Adams. From Randle or Packwood in the north, it can be accessed via Primary Road 23, to Road 5601, and 2329, or alternately from Packwood on Primary Road 21 to Road 2329. The loop from Packwood to Takhlakh Lake and the surrounding Midway High Lakes, along the scenic Cispus River to Randle, and back to Packwood along US Route 12 makes up the High Lakes Loop (Scenic Driving) from the White Pass Scenic Byway.

== Media and Notability ==
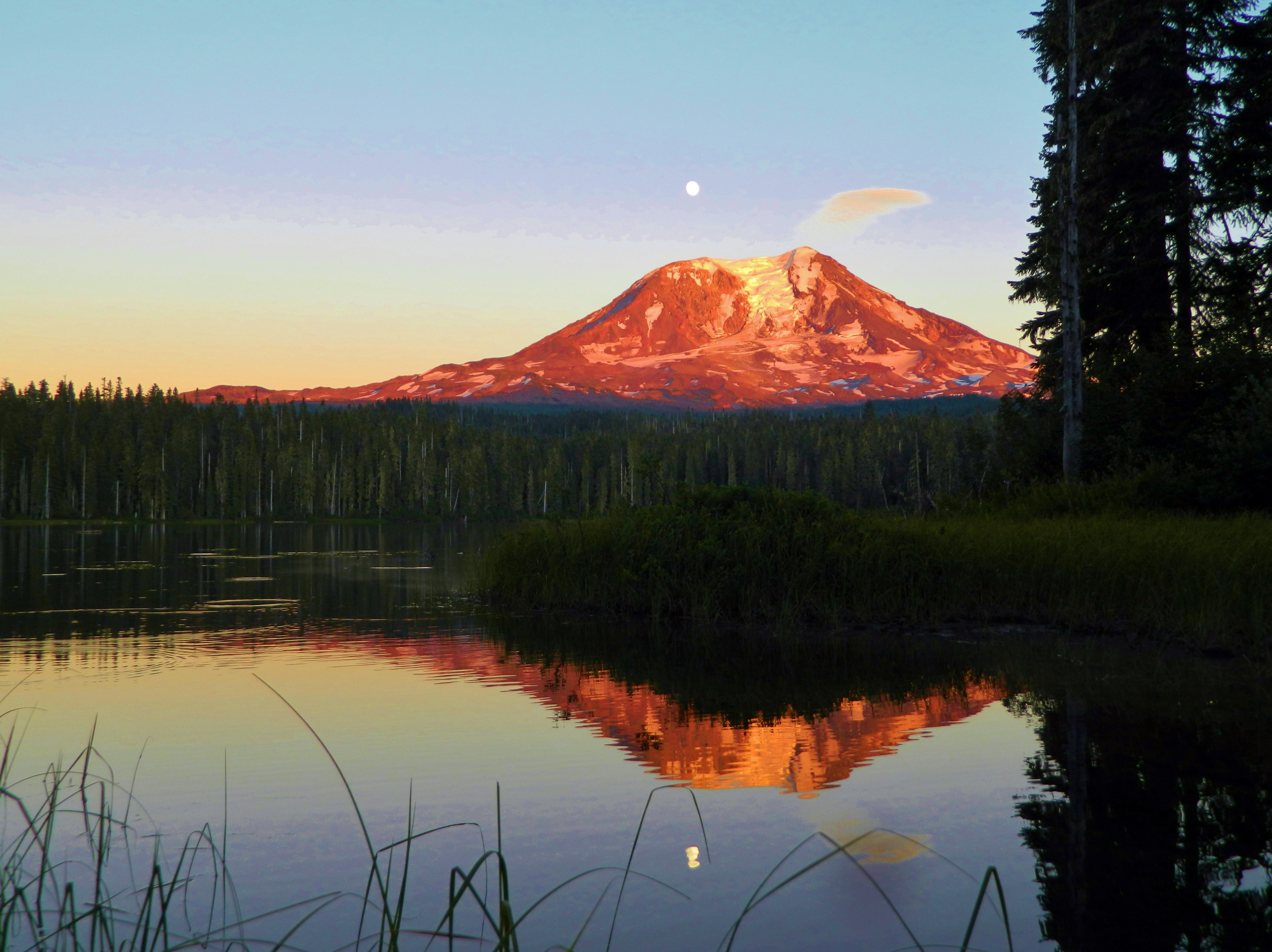
Sunset Reflection

- In 1989, National Geographic featured a photograph showing vacationers playing at Takhlakh Lake. The photo was taken by James P. Blair for, but not published in, "Old Growth Forests: Will We Save Our Own?," September 1990, National Geographic magazine)
- In 2013, National Geographic featured Takhklakh Lake on a photograph titled: "Mount Adams reflected in Takhlakh Lake". It was one of the twenty places in the world chosen for National Geographic's Must-Do Trip's, called "Ultimate Adventure Bucket List 2013". The post was entitled as "Must-Do Trip: Hike Around Mount Adams, Washington". The photo was taken by Randall J. Hodges, from Getty Images. In it, she recommends the 35-mile circumnavigation of Mount Adams on a route hiking on several trails: the Highline, the Round the Mountain, and others (such as a portion of the Pacific Crest Trail); and includes some off-trail hiking at the east side of the mountain.

== See also ==
- List of lakes in Washington
