= Adams Glacier (Mount Adams) =

Glacier in Washington state

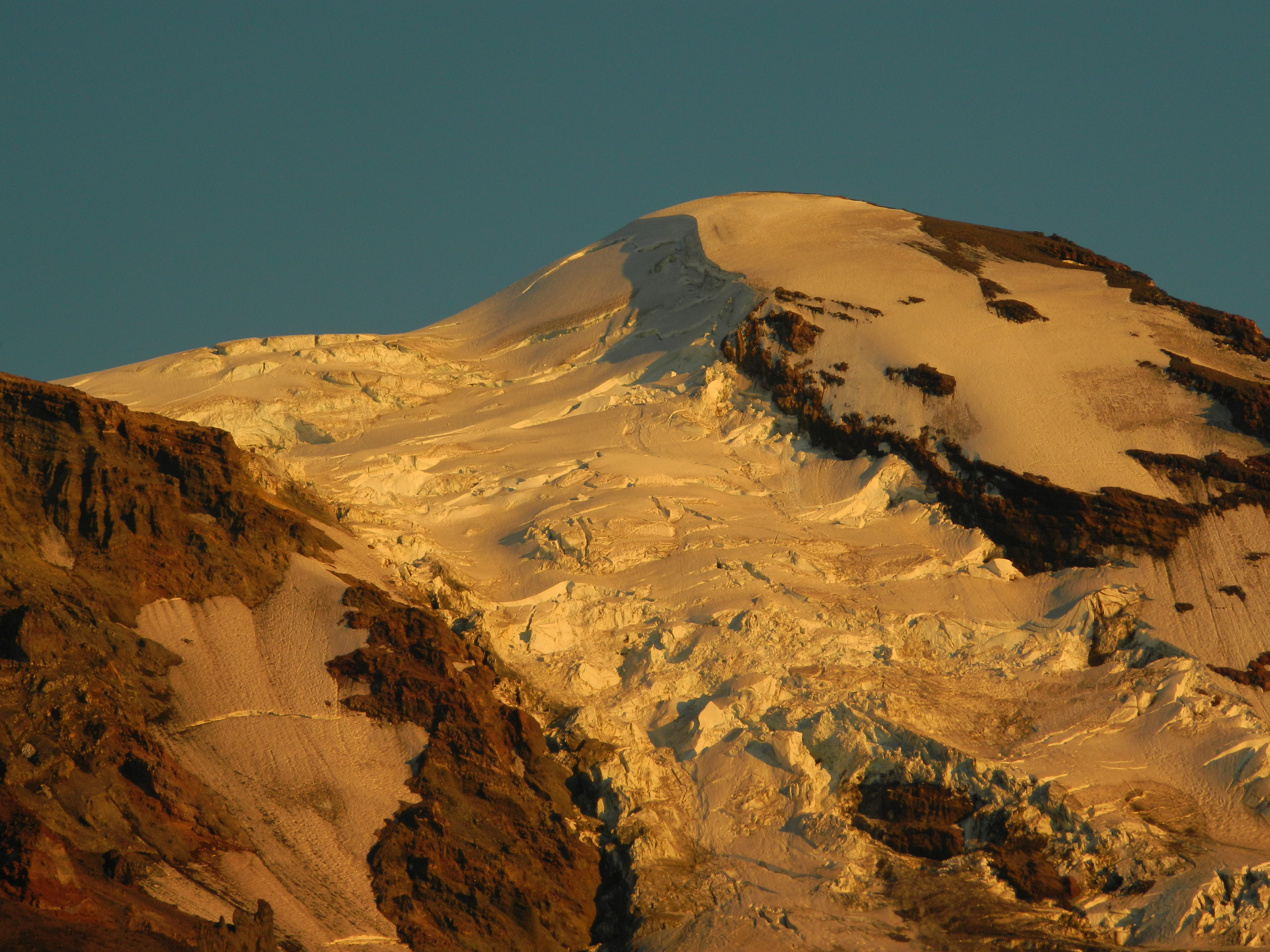
- Adams Glacier from the northwest

- Location within Washington (state) Location within the United States
- Type: Mountain glacier
- Location: Mount Adams, Yakima / Skamania counties, Washington, United States
- Coordinates: 46°13′2″N 121°30′42″W
- Area: 3.68 km^{2} (1.42 sq mi) in 2006
- Length: 2.5 miles (4.0 km)
- Terminus: Moraines
- Status: Retreating

Adams Glacier is situated on the northwest flank of Mount Adams, a 12,281-foot (3,743 m) stratovolcano in the U.S. state of Washington. Much of it becomes the source of Adams Creek, a tributary of the Cispus River. However, the glacier is also the source of the Lewis River. It is the largest glacier on Mount Adams. It flows down from the summit ice cap at over 12,000 feet (3,700 m) for over 2.5 miles (4.0 km) to a terminus near 7,000 feet (2,100 m).

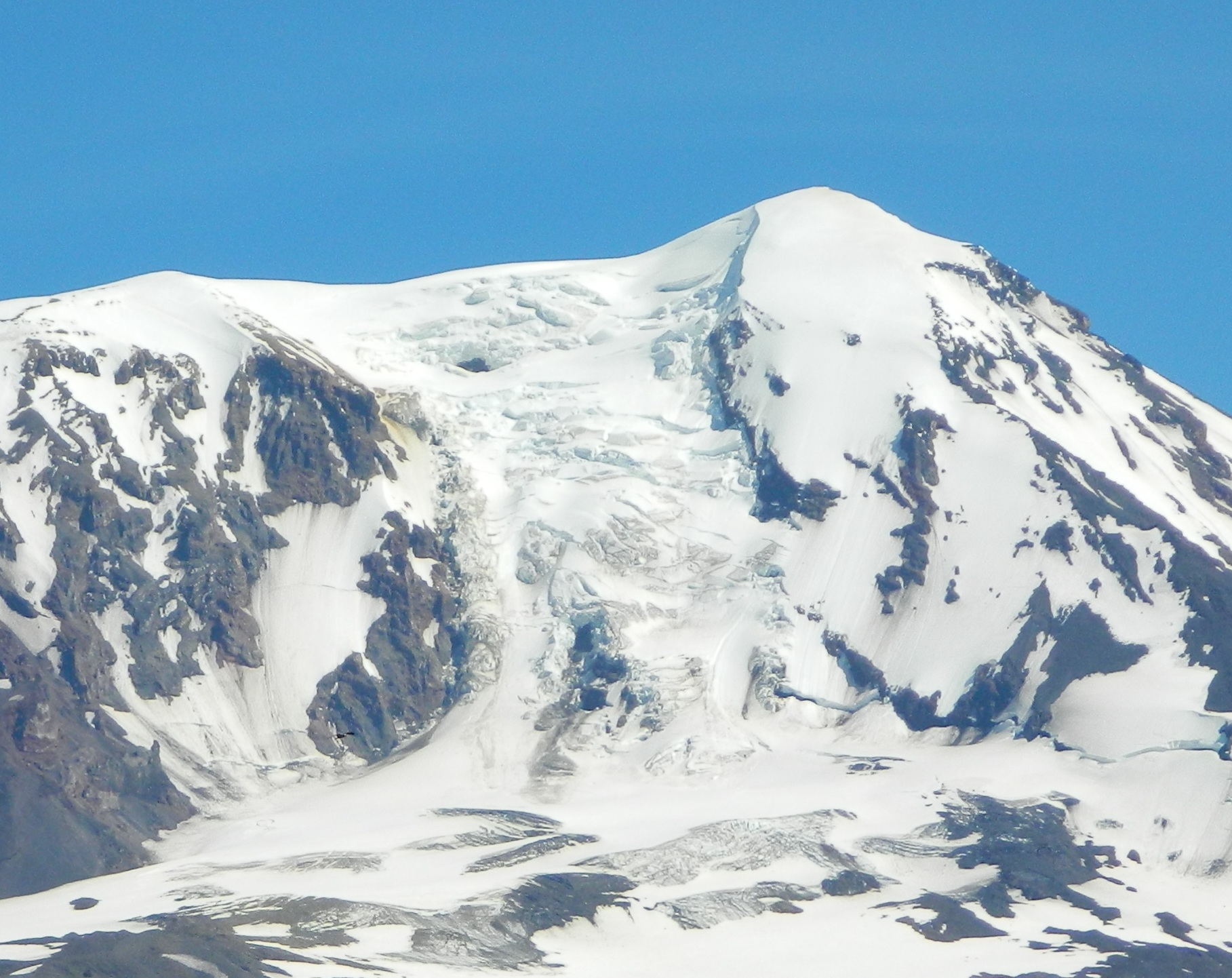
Adams Glacier, cascading down the 12,281 ft. summit.

Between 11,800 and 9,200 feet (3,600 and 2,800 m), the glacier flows through a steep icefall that provides challenging climbing through a maze of seracs. The first ascent of the glacier was by Fred Beckey, Dave Lind, and Robert Mulhall in July 1945.

Below 8,400 feet (2,600 m), the glacier spreads into a broad sheet with five separate tongues of ice extending out to termini between large moraines. On its easternmost tongue, it ends at a glacial tarn, or small ice-choked lake above High Camp.

In 1904, the area was approximately 6.93 km^{2} and in 2021 the area was 2.2 km^{2} representing an area loss of 68%.

In 1901, when Mount Adams was being mapped and its glaciers named by Harry Fielding Reid, Reid's companion and guide, Claude Ewing Rusk, wanted to name the glacier Reid Glacier in honor of Reid; however, Reid insisted that it should be named something else because he thought it improper to place his own name on the map that he was making and the Mazamas were trying to name a glacier on Mount Hood after him. This eventually persuaded Rusk and he conceded to name the glacier Adams Glacier.

== See also ==
- List of glaciers in the United States
