= Washington State Route 141 =

State highway in Klickitat County, Washington

State Route 141
- SR 141 highlighted in red, SR 141 Alt. in blue

Route information
- Auxiliary route of SR 14
- Maintained by WSDOT
- Length: 29.25 mi (47.07 km)
- Existed: 1964–present

Major junctions
- South end: SR 14 in Bingen
- SR 141 Alt. near White Salmon
- North end: FR 24 at Klickitat–Skamania county line

Location
- Country: United States
- State: Washington
- Counties: Klickitat

Highway system
- State highways in Washington; Interstate; US; State; Scenic; Pre-1964; 1964 renumbering; Former
← SR 131	→ SR 142

State Route 141 (SR 141) is a state highway in Klickitat County, Washington, United States. It runs north–south for 29 miles (47 km), connecting SR 14 in Bingen to White Salmon and Trout Lake. The highway follows the White Salmon River towards the base of Mount Adams, terminating at the Skamania County border at the entrance to the Gifford Pinchot National Forest, where it becomes Forest Road 24 (Carson Guler Road). SR 141 is a state scenic highway that provides access to recreation areas on the south side of Mount Adams.

The original road along the White Salmon River was built in the 1920s by local residents and designated by the state government in 1937 as Secondary State Highway 8D (SSH 8D). The highway was renumbered to SR 121 in 1964 and then SR 141 in 1967. The highway has a signed alternate route that connects it to SR 14 at Underwood, bypassing Bingen and White Salmon.

== Route description ==
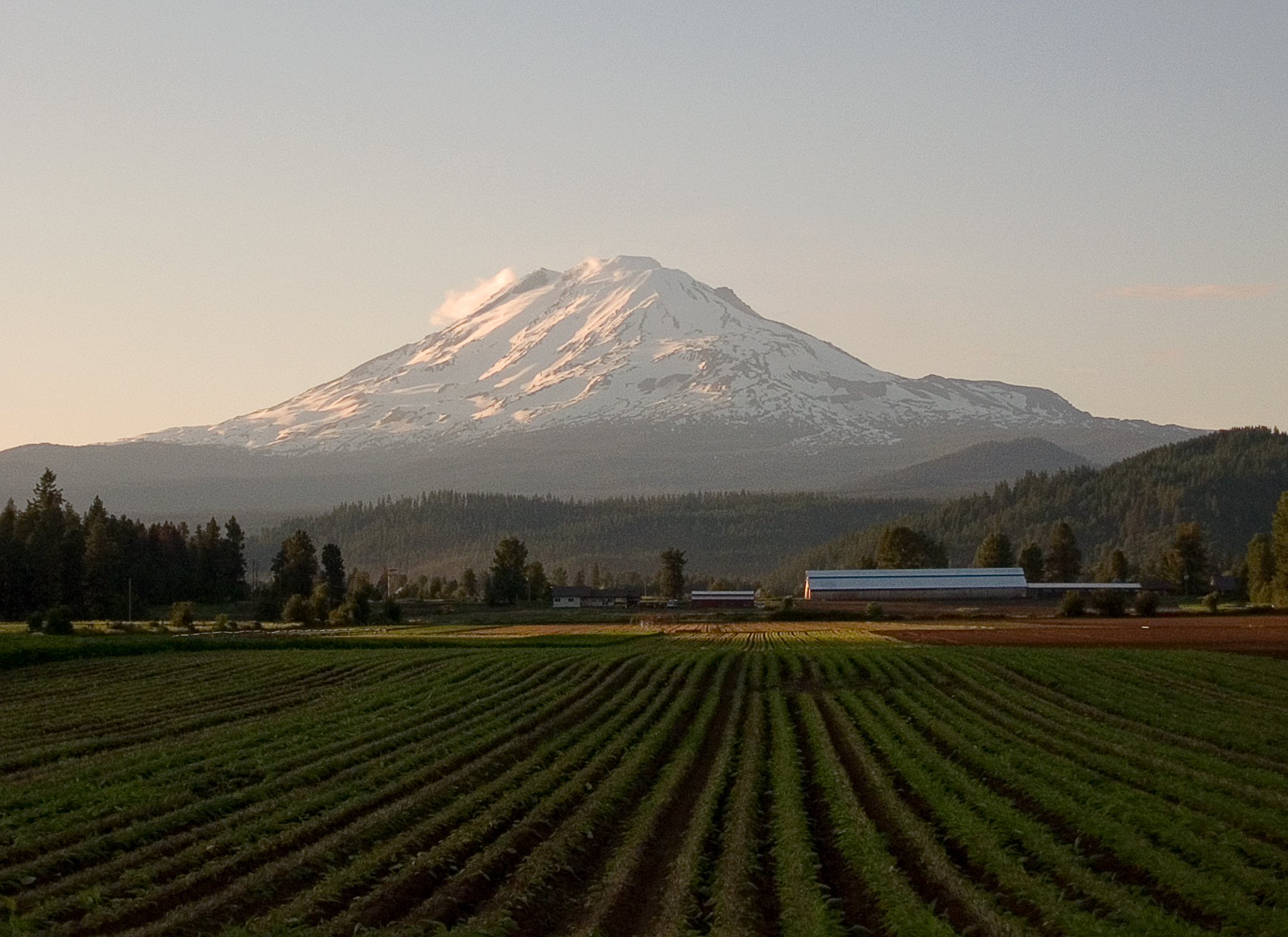
View of Mount Adams from SR 141

SR 141 begins in downtown Bingen at an intersection with SR 14 near the city's Amtrak train station. It travels north through Bingen as Oak Street and turns northwest to ascend a ridge and enter the adjacent settlement of White Salmon. The highway travels west through White Salmon on Jewett Boulevard and continues along the ridge overlooking SR 141 and the Hood River Bridge crossing the Columbia River. SR 141 enters a rural area on the outskirts of White Salmon and descends towards a plateau, making a sharp turn west over a stream and north to follow Winebarger Road. The highway continues its descent towards the White Salmon River, intersecting an alternate route with access to SR 14.

The highway follows the White Salmon River upstream to Husum, where it crosses over below Husum Falls on a historic steel and concrete truss bridge. SR 141 continues north along the west bank of the river, passing through farmland and forestland that is dominated by Ponderosa pine. At BZ Corner, it intersects a local highway that travels northeast to Glenwood and the Conboy Lake National Wildlife Refuge. The highway travels north through the expanded White Salmon River Valley and reaches the town of Trout Lake near Mount Adams, where it turns west towards the Cascade Mountains, following Cave Creek. SR 141 terminates at the Klickitat–Skamania county line, which also marks the boundary of the Gifford Pinchot National Forest. The road continues west as Forest Road 24 on Carson Guler Road towards the Guler Ice Caves and the Indian Heaven Wilderness Area; the forest road is closed annually from December 1 to March 31 with limited access for winter recreation use.

SR 141 is designated as part of the Washington State Scenic and Recreational Highways system and provides access to the south side of Mount Adams, which includes the Mount Adams Wilderness and Mount Adams Recreation Area. SR 141 is maintained by the Washington State Department of Transportation (WSDOT), which conducts an annual survey on state highways to measure traffic volume in terms of annual average daily traffic. Average traffic volumes on the two-lane highway in 2016 ranged from a minimum of 180 vehicles near Gifford Pinchot National Forest to a maximum of 6,400 vehicles in downtown Bingen.

== History ==
The Klickitat County government began planning a road along the upper White Salmon River in the 1910s after a request from residents of Glenwood to build a road. Local residents volunteered to build the road in the 1920s under supervision from the county government, using private donations to fund their cause. The early road was added to the state highway system in 1937 as Secondary State Highway 8D (SSH 8D), a branch of Primary State Highway 8 (PSH 8) along the Columbia River. The state government funded several improvements to the road, including a steel truss bridge across the White Salmon River at Husum Falls that opened in 1940. The state legislature created a western branch of SSH 8D in 1951 that would bypass Bingen and White Salmon.

The state highway system was renumbered and restructured as "sign routes" (later "state routes") in 1964. Under the new system, SSH 8D was initially designated as State Route 121 (SR 121), an auxiliary route of SR 12, the successor to PSH 8. The extension of U.S. Route 12 (US 12) across Washington in 1967 caused SR 12 to be renumbered to SR 14, and SR 121 became SR 141 as a result. The former SR 141 was absorbed into US 12 during a relocation caused by the Mossyrock Dam's construction, while SR 121 was re-used for another highway in Thurston County.

Traffic congestion on SR 141 during peak months has risen due to an increase in the number of visitors to recreational facilities on the corridor, requiring lowered speed limits to prevent vehicle–pedestrian collisions. A shoulder rumble strip on the highway was removed and replaced with a fog stripe during a chip sealing project in 2014, causing local residents and recreational users to protest. In response, WSDOT installed a 6-inch (150 mm) rumble strip along the shoulder line to improve safety for pedestrians and bicyclists using SR 141. Despite the improvements, a majority of respondents to a local survey in 2015 stated that they felt it was not safe to walk or bike on SR 141.

== Major intersections ==
County	Location	mi	km	Destinations	Notes
Klickitat	Bingen	0.00	0.00	SR 14 – Vancouver, Kennewick	
Klickitat		4.69	7.55	SR 141 Alt. south	
Klickitat–Skamania county line		29.23	47.04	FR 11 – Atkisson Sno-Park	
Klickitat–Skamania county line		29.25	47.07	FR 24 (Carson Guler Road)	Continuation beyond northern terminus
1.000 mi = 1.609 km; 1.000 km = 0.621 mi

== Alternate route ==
State Route 141 Alternate
- Location: Klickitat County
- Length: 2.16 mi (3.48 km)
- Existed: 1970–present

A designated alternate route connects SR 141 to SR 14 in Underwood, bypassing Bingen and White Salmon. The highway follows the White Salmon River to its mouth at the Columbia River, traveling for 2.16 miles (3.48 km). It was established in 1970 as part of SR 141, becoming the successor to the west branch of SSH 8D. The alternate route carried average daily traffic volumes of 3,200 vehicles in 2016.

=== Major intersections ===
The entire highway is in Klickitat County.

Location	mi	km	Destinations	Notes
Underwood	0.00	0.00	SR 14 – Vancouver, Kennewick	
	2.16	3.48	SR 141 – BZ Corner, Trout Lake, Glenwood, White Salmon	
1.000 mi = 1.609 km; 1.000 km = 0.621 mi
