= Trout Lake Mudflow =

Lahar in Washington, United States

Coordinates: 45.9973°N 121.5280°W

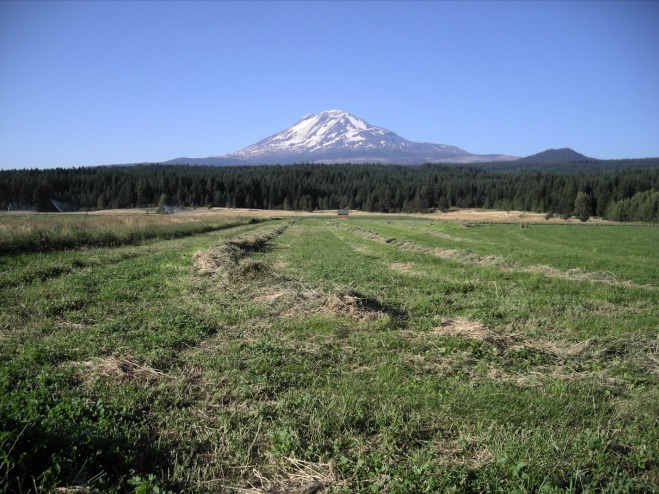
View of Mount Adams from the broad, flat-floored, middle White Salmon River valley near Trout Lake. All of the fields in this view are underlain by a thick deposit of the Trout Lake Mudflow.

The Trout Lake Mudflow was a lahar in the U.S. state of Washington that descended from Mount Adams about 6,000 years ago. It was the largest lahar at Mount Adams since the end of the last ice age, having emplaced about 66,000,000 m^{3} (2.3×10^{9} ft^{3}) of mud and rock in a deposit covering more than 16 km^{2} (6.2 mi^{2}) of the White Salmon River valley near Trout Lake. The mudflow began as a slope failure high on the southwest flank of Mount Adams where the accumulation zone of the White Salmon and Avalanche glaciers are now located, flowed down tributaries to the White Salmon River, then followed the river valley southward. Husum, an unincorporated community nearly 60 km (37 mi) downstream from Mount Adams, marks the maximum known extent of the mudflow.

The mudflow deposit is poorly sorted, unstratified, not graded, and contains abundant clasts of hydrothermally altered andesite. Veneer deposits, up to several tens of centimeters thick, crop out at scattered localities on hillsides and high terraces in valleys below timberline. Along Cascade Creek, between Salt Creek and the White Salmon River, younger lahars obscure the Trout Lake Mudflow at most localities. No deposits of the Trout Lake Mudflow have been found in the upper narrows of the White Salmon River although it flowed through that reach. The most extensive deposit of the Trout Lake Mudflow, a lode nearly 12 km (7.5 mi) long and a maximum of 2 km (1.2 mi) wide, underlies the Trout Lake lowland.

The Trout Lake Mudflow changed the courses of both the White Salmon River and Trout Lake Creek in the Trout Lake lowland. Emplacement of the mudflow dammed Trout Lake Creek to form Trout Lake. The original lake is now a complex of interconnected ponds and marshland. The White Salmon River returned to its former channel incised in bedrock near the distal margin of the Trout Lake lobe. An ancient White Salmon River channel in the upper Trout Lake lowland is located at a base level about 15 m (49 ft) below and 100 m (330 ft) farther west of its present location. In the upper Trout Lake lowland, the White Salmon River and Trout Lake Creek flow along the margin of the lahar where its surface is slightly convex in the upper Trout Lake lowland; near the confluence they have incised into the lahar. The White Salmon River has dissected the mudflow and underlying alluvium throughout much of the lowland; locally it is incised into 1 to 2 m (3.3 to 6.6 ft) of the basalt of Ice Cave.
