= Bingen, Washington =

Bingen
- City
- Coordinates: 45°42′50″N 121°28′13″W
- Country: United States
- State: Washington
- County: Klickitat
- Founded: 1892
- Incorporated: April 18, 1924

Government
  - Mayor: Catherine Kiewit

Area
  - Total: 0.89 sq mi (2.30 km^{2})
  - Land: 0.62 sq mi (1.61 km^{2})
  - Water: 0.26 sq mi (0.68 km^{2}) 11.43%
- Elevation: 98 ft (30 m)

Population (2020)
  - Total: 778
  - Estimate (2022): 774
  - Density: 1,191.6/sq mi (460.07/km^{2})
- Time zone: UTC-8 (Pacific (PST))
  - Summer (DST): UTC-7 (PDT)
- ZIP code: 98605
- Area code: 509
- FIPS code: 53-06085
- GNIS feature ID: 2409850
- Website: bingenwashington.org

Bingen is a city in Klickitat County, Washington, United States. The population was 778 at the 2020 census.

== History ==
Bingen was founded by P.J. Suksdorf in 1892, and named by him for Bingen am Rhein in Germany. Bingen was officially incorporated on April 18, 1924.

The name of the town is pronounced /ˈbɪndʒən/ (BIN-jen), despite the fact that its German namesake is pronounced /ˈbɪŋən/ (BING-en).

== Geography ==
According to the United States Census Bureau, the city has a total area of 0.70 square miles (1.81 km^{2}), of which 0.62 square miles (1.61 km^{2}) is land and 0.08 square miles (0.21 km^{2}) is water.

=== Climate ===
Bingen has a warm-summer Mediterranean climate (Köppen: Csb) characterized by very warm and dry summers, and cold, rainy or snowy winters. Bingen experiences much hotter summers than locations near the coast such as Portland, but retains the high winter rainfall associated with coastal locations. Daytime highs in summer are representative for areas with hot-summer Mediterranean climates, but is moderated by cool nights, causing high diurnal temperature variation.

Average temperatures range from 39 °F (3.9 °C) in January to 68 °F (20 °C) in July. Bingen on average has wet winters and dry summers, also representative for the region. Temperatures above 90 °F (32.2 °C) happen frequently in summertime.

Summer highs are extremely hot when compared to areas that are affected by coastal fog.

Climate data for Bingen, Washington
Month	Jan	Feb	Mar	Apr	May	Jun	Jul	Aug	Sep	Oct	Nov	Dec	Year
Mean daily maximum °F (°C)	45.0 (7.2)	50.0 (10.0)	56.0 (13.3)	61.0 (16.1)	68.0 (20.0)	73.0 (22.8)	80.0 (26.7)	79.0 (26.1)	74.0 (23.3)	64.0 (17.8)	53.0 (11.7)	46.0 (7.8)	62.4 (16.9)
Daily mean °F (°C)	39.0 (3.9)	43.0 (6.1)	48.0 (8.9)	52.0 (11.1)	58.0 (14.4)	63.0 (17.2)	68.0 (20.0)	68.0 (20.0)	63.0 (17.2)	55.0 (12.8)	46.0 (7.8)	41.0 (5.0)	53.7 (12.0)
Mean daily minimum °F (°C)	34.0 (1.1)	36.0 (2.2)	39.0 (3.9)	42.0 (5.6)	48.0 (8.9)	58.0 (14.4)	57.0 (13.9)	57.0 (13.9)	52.0 (11.1)	46.0 (7.8)	40.0 (4.4)	36.0 (2.2)	45.4 (7.5)
Average precipitation inches (mm)	6.2 (160)	4.4 (110)	3.8 (97)	2.0 (51)	1.4 (36)	1.1 (28)	0.3 (7.6)	0.5 (13)	1.0 (25)	2.9 (74)	6.4 (160)	7.1 (180)	37.1 (941.6)
Average snowfall inches (cm)	14.3 (36)	7.5 (19)	3.0 (7.6)	0.4 (1.0)	0 (0)	0 (0)	0 (0)	0 (0)	0 (0)	0.1 (0.25)	4.8 (12)	16.4 (42)	46.5 (117.85)
Average rainy days	15	12	13	10	8	5	2	2	4	9	16	16	112
Source 1:
Source 2:

== Demographics ==
Historical population
Census	Pop.	Note	%±
1930	365		—
1940	600		64.4%
1950	736		22.7%
1960	636		−13.6%
1970	671		5.5%
1980	644		−4.0%
1990	645		0.2%
2000	672		4.2%
2010	712		6.0%
2020	778		9.3%
2022 (est.)	774		−0.5%
U.S. Decennial Census; 2020 Census

=== 2020 census ===
As of the 2020 census, Bingen had a population of 778. The median age was 38.2 years, with 19.7% of residents under the age of 18 and 13.1% 65 years of age or older. For every 100 females there were 118.5 males, and for every 100 females age 18 and over there were 122.4 males age 18 and over.

The 2020 census recorded 100.0% of residents living in urban areas and 0.0% in rural areas.

The 2020 census counted 291 households in Bingen, of which 34.7% had children under the age of 18 living in them. Of all households, 37.1% were married-couple households, 27.5% were households with a male householder and no spouse or partner present, and 25.1% were households with a female householder and no spouse or partner present. About 29.5% of all households were made up of individuals and 11.7% had someone living alone who was 65 years of age or older.

The 2020 census counted 337 housing units, of which 13.6% were vacant. The homeowner vacancy rate was 0.0% and the rental vacancy rate was 11.2%.

Racial composition as of the 2020 census
Race	Number	Percentage
White	442	56.8%
Black or African American	0	0.0%
American Indian and Alaska Native	39	5.0%
Asian	11	1.4%
Native Hawaiian and Other Pacific Islander	0	0.0%
Some other race	198	25.4%
Two or more races	88	11.3%
Hispanic or Latino (of any race)	294	37.8%

=== 2010 census ===
As of the 2010 census, there were 712 people, 286 households, and 161 families living in the city. The population density was 1,148.4 inhabitants per square mile (443.4/km^{2}). There were 313 housing units at an average density of 504.8 per square mile (194.9/km^{2}). The racial makeup of the city was 72.2% White, 0.3% African American, 1.3% Native American, 0.3% Asian, 0.1% Pacific Islander, 19.0% from other races, and 6.9% from two or more races. Hispanic or Latino of any race were 28.1% of the population.

There were 286 households, of which 35.3% had children under the age of 18 living with them, 37.1% were married couples living together, 11.5% had a female householder with no husband present, 7.7% had a male householder with no wife present, and 43.7% were non-families. 34.3% of all households were made up of individuals, and 5.9% had someone living alone who was 65 years of age or older. The average household size was 2.46 and the average family size was 3.15.

The median age in the city was 35.2 years. 26.3% of residents were under the age of 18; 8% were between the ages of 18 and 24; 31.9% were from 25 to 44; 24.8% were from 45 to 64; and 9% were 65 years of age or older. The gender makeup of the city was 53.8% male and 46.2% female.

== Transportation ==
Bingen is located along State Route 14, which connects it to other communities along the north bank of the Columbia River. The Hood River Bridge is located west of the city and connects State Route 14 to Hood River, Oregon, and Interstate 84. Bingen is also the terminus of State Route 141, a highway that connects it to White Salmon, Trout Lake, and the base of Mount Adams.

The city is home to Bingen–White Salmon station, which is served by daily Amtrak trains on the Empire Builder between Portland, Oregon, and Chicago. Mount Adams Transportation Service provides bus service.
