= Mount Adams Recreation Area =

Recreation area in Washington, U.S.

- IUCN category III (natural monument or feature)
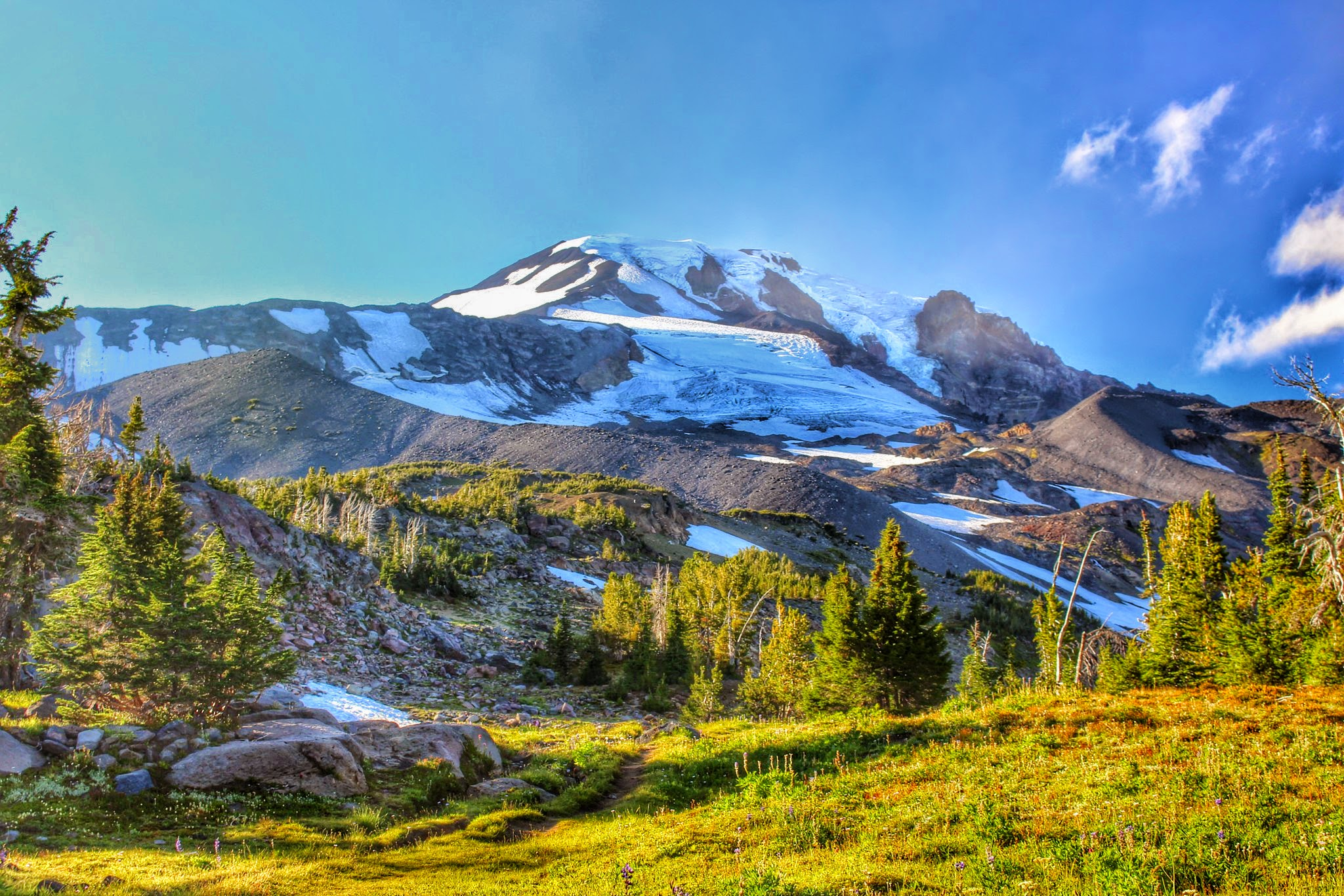

- Location within the United States
- Location: Yakima County, Washington, U.S.
- Nearest city: Glenwood, Washington
- Coordinates: 46°09′42″N 121°25′35″W
- Area: 47,708 acres (19,307 ha)
- Established: 1972
- Governing body: Yakama Indian Nation

The Mount Adams Recreation Area is a 21,000-acre (8,500 ha) recreation area in the U.S. state of Washington managed by the Yakama Nation Tribal Forestry Program. The area encompasses an ecologically complex and geologically active landscape. The region features the most rugged side of Mount Adams, including canyons and the Great Gap section of the Mount Adams circumnavigation route, a three-mile trail-less section over two great canyons and many difficult glacial creeks. At 12,276 feet (3,742 m), Mount Adams is one of the major Cascade mountains. The recreation area is on the east side of the mountain and is part of the Yakama Indian Reservation and includes the popular Bird Creek Meadows area.

== Recreation ==
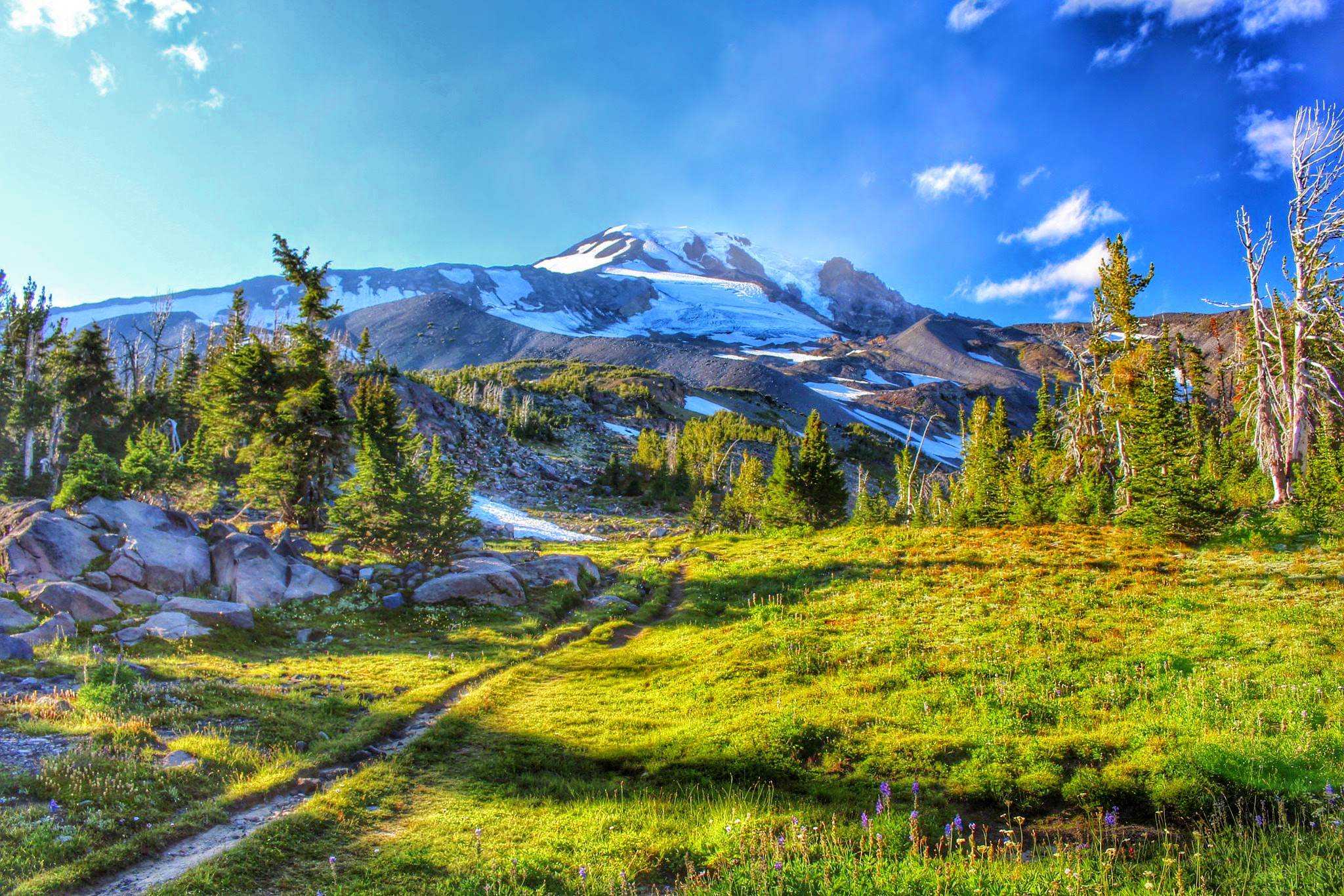
Bird Creek Meadows

The Mount Adams Recreation Area offers activities such as hiking, camping, backpacking (at specific campsites), picnicking, and fishing. The area features Bird Creek Meadows, a popular picnic and hiking area noted for its outstanding display of wildflowers, and exceptional views of Mount Adams and its glaciers, as well as Mount Hood to the south.

=== Hiking ===
At Bird Creek Meadows, hikers can access the Hellroaring Overlook, where they can view Hellroaring Meadows, a glacial valley about 1,000 feet (300 m) down from the viewpoint precipice. From here, hikers can gaze up 5,800 feet (1,800 m) at Mount Adams, the Klickitat Glacier, and various waterfalls tumbling off of high cliffs below the glaciers terminus. There are many loop trails at Bird Creek Meadows, including the Trail of the Flowers. Trails travel through meadows, streams, and waterfalls, including Crooked Creek Falls. Bird Creek Meadows was closed in 2015 due to the Cougar Complex fire and was not yet opened as of summer 2018.

Little Mount Adams (6,821 ft [2,079 m]) is a symmetrical cinder cone on top of the Ridge of Wonders, and rises from the northeast end of Hellroaring Meadow and the Hellroaring Creek valley. It offers a trail to the east base of the peak. To reach the top, hikers must traverse rocky terrain; and if there are, user-made trails.

==== The Around the Mountain – Highline Circuit ====
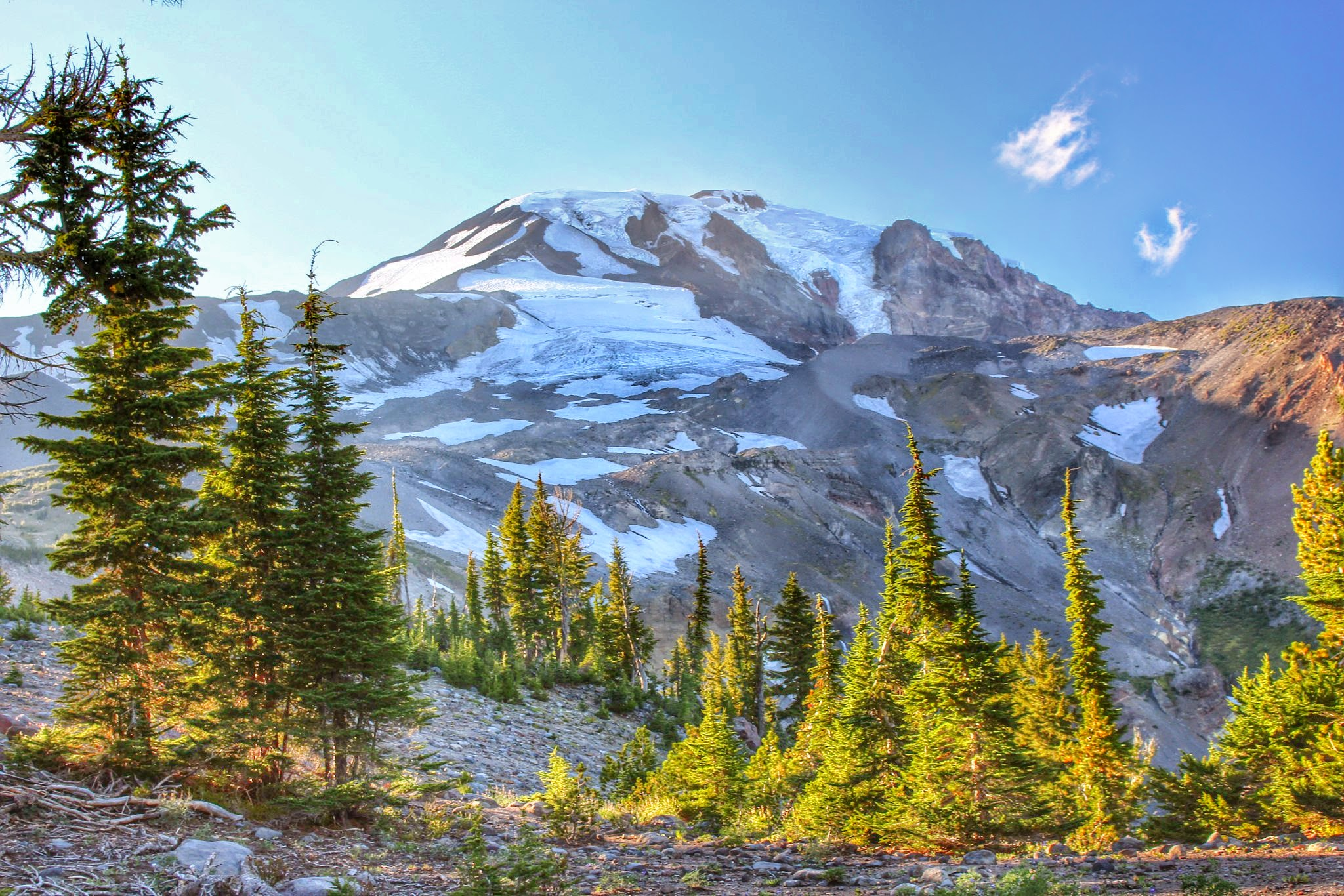
Mount Adams along Trail #20 just above Hellroaring Overlook, on the way to Iceberg Lake and Sunrise Camp

The Round the Mountain Trail, the Pacific Crest Trail, and the Highline Trail when joined almost completely encircle the mountain, save for a four-mile section known as "The Gap" on the east side of the Mountain in the Mount Adams Recreation Area. The Round the Mountain Trail extends from the Pacific Crest Trail on the southwest side of the Mount Adams Wilderness, and travels east over the A.G. Aiken Lava Bed before crossing into the Yakama Nation Mount Adams Recreation Area. It then proceeds to pass through Bird Creek Meadows before ending at the western edge of Hellroaring Canyon. Hikers can continue the round the mountain circuit by following Trail #20 to Hellroaring Overlook, then continue following the (now poorly defined) trail to Sunrise Camp, perched between the Mazama and Klickitat Glaciers at 8,000 feet. North of Sunrise Camp it is completely trail-less and suited only for experienced backcountry travellers. Hikers have to negotiate dangerous creek crossings, 1,000-foot-deep canyons and valleys, and a glacier-crossing of the Klickitat Glacier. At the north end, hikers rejoin the Highline Trail which ends at Avalanche Valley in the Mount Adams Recreation Area.

=== Camping ===
There are three campgrounds in the Mount Adams Recreation Area. A campground is located each at Bird Lake, Mirror Lake, and Bench Lake. The area is accessed from Trout Lake via the Mount Adams Recreation Highway, northeast on Forest Road 82, to Forest Road 8225, and on Tribal Route 285 (Bench Lake Road), passing the Bird Creek Meadows Parking Area, and ending at Bench Lake. Bird Lake Road leads off of Bench Lake Road, and heads north to Bird Lake. All of the roads after the short section known as the Mount Adams Recreation Highway is gravel and dirt, and is known to be extremely rough and often only suitable for trucks or high clearance vehicles.

=== Climbing ===
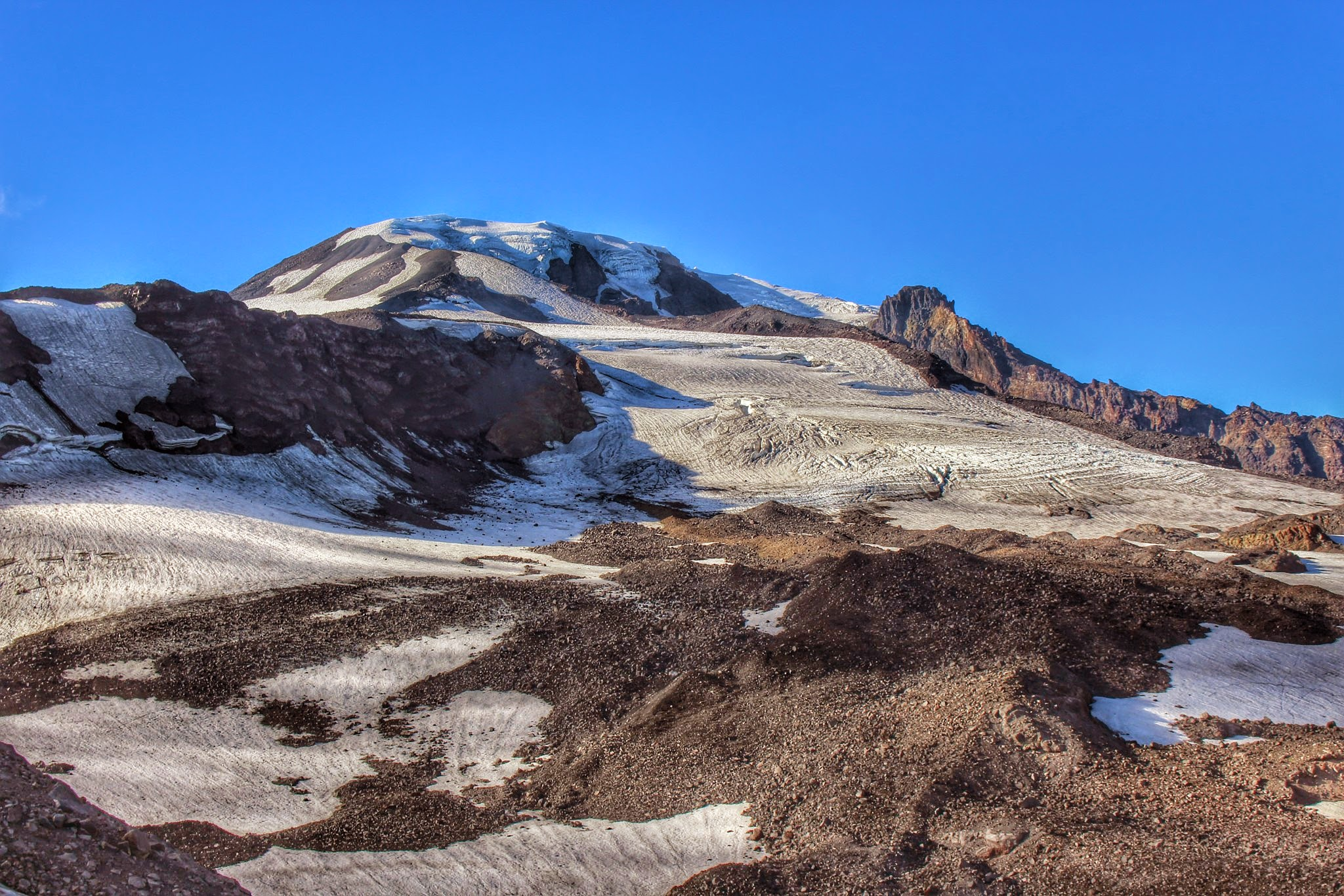
Heavily crevassed glaciers seen from the Bird Creek Meadows area of the recreation area

Each year, hundreds of people attempt to summit Mount Adams, but few attempt the faces within the Mount Adams Recreation Area. Crampons, ice axes, and ropes are needed on all routes here because of the glaciers, crevasses, and jagged cliffs found on Mount Adams' rugged east side. Climbing Mount Adams can be dangerous for a variety of reasons and people do die in pursuit of the summit.
