= Underwood, Washington =

Unincorporated community in Washington, United States

- Unincorporated community
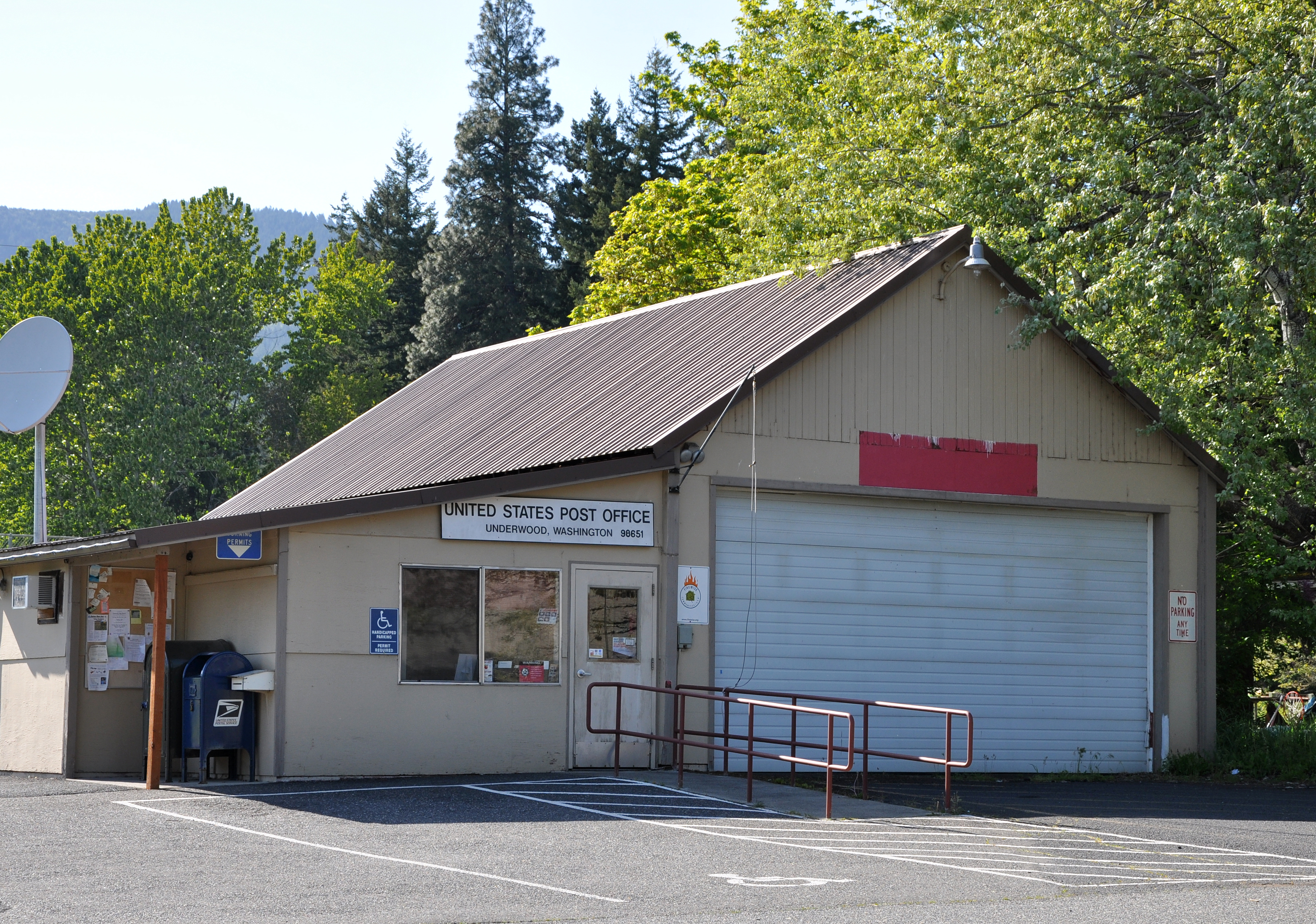
- Post office in Underwood

- Location within Washington (state)
- Coordinates: 45°43′46″N 121°31′34″W
- Country: United States
- State: Washington
- County: Skamania
- Elevation: 128 ft (39 m)
- Time zone: UTC-8 (Pacific (PST))
  - Summer (DST): UTC-7 (PDT)
- ZIP code: 98651
- Area code: 509
- GNIS feature ID: 1512748

Underwood is an unincorporated community within the Columbia River Gorge National Scenic Area along the Columbia River in Skamania County, Washington, United States.

== History ==
The community's moniker comes from Amos Underwood, a pioneer settler. Amos and his brother, Edward Underwood, settled at the mouth of the White Salmon River in 1865.

A post office called Underwood has been in operation since 1900.

== Geography ==
Underwood is located along Washington State Route 14 at the confluence of the White Salmon and Columbia Rivers. The community lies at the southeastern corner of Skamania County. Underwood is across the Columbia River from Hood River, Oregon, and 2 miles (3.2 km) west of White Salmon, Washington. Mount Hood in Oregon can be seen on a clear day

== See also ==
- List of unincorporated communities in Washington
