= Condit Hydroelectric Project =

Former dam in Washington, United States

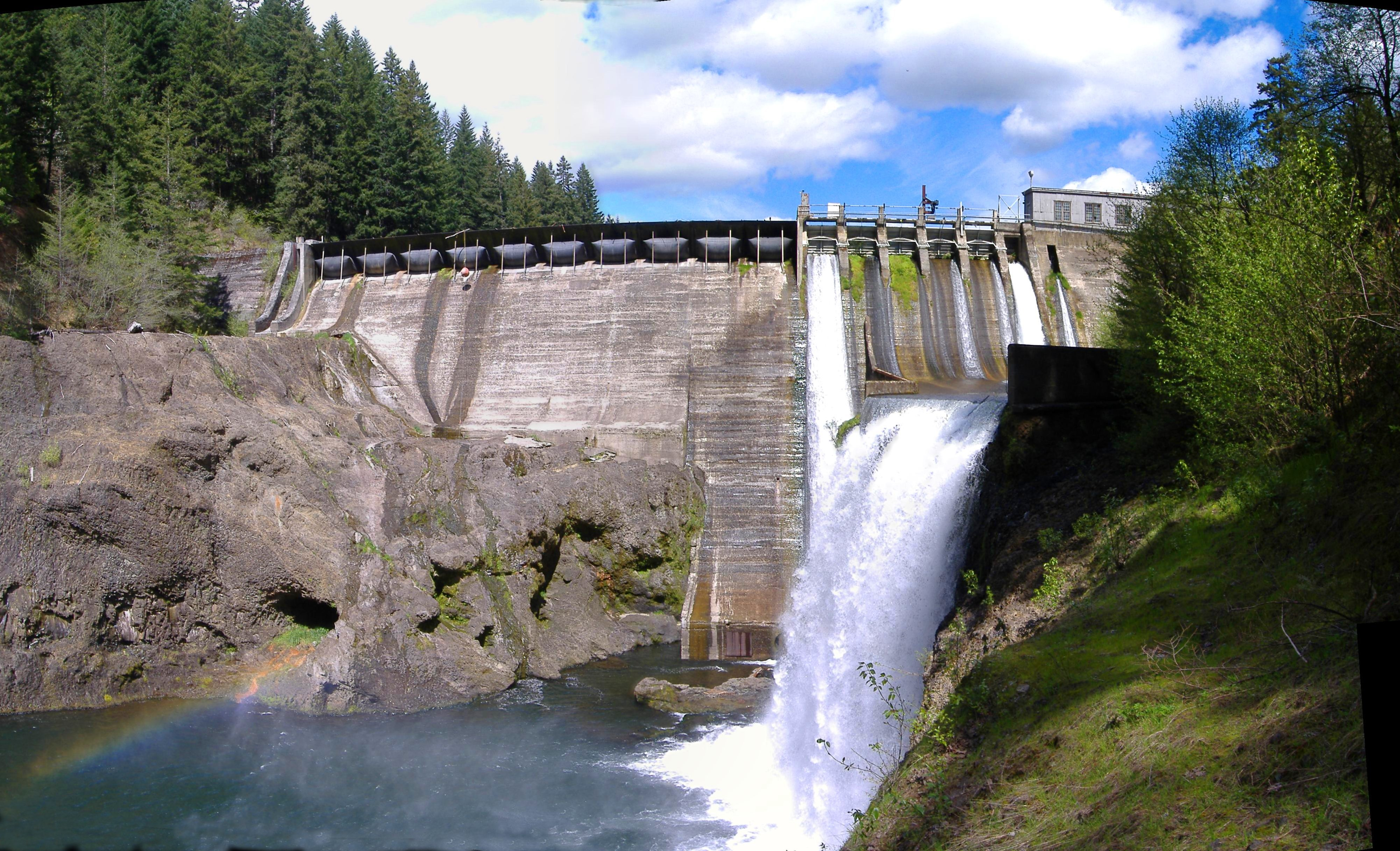
Condit Dam

Condit Hydroelectric Project was a development on the White Salmon River in the U.S. state of Washington. It was completed in 1913 to provide electrical power for local industry, and is listed in the National Register of Historic Places as an engineering and architecture landmark.

PacifiCorp decommissioned the project due to rising environmental costs, and the dam was intentionally breached on October 26, 2011. Condit Dam was the largest dam ever removed in the United States until the Elwha Ecosystem Restoration Project on the Olympic Peninsula removed the larger Elwha Dam and Glines Canyon Dam.

== Overview and history ==
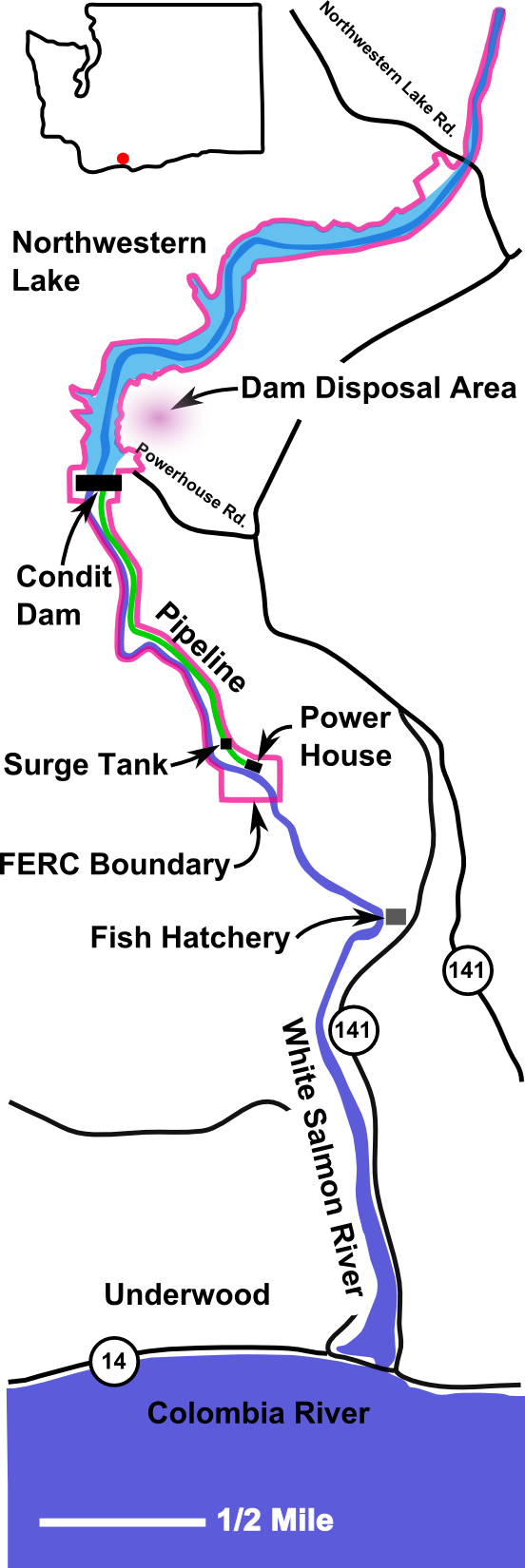
Map of the Condit Hydroelectric Project

The White Salmon is a glacier-fed river originating on the slopes of Mount Adams and emptying into the Columbia River. Condit Dam is about 3.3 miles (5.3 km) upstream of the confluence. The area below the dam is part of the Columbia River Gorge National Scenic Area, while parts of the river upstream belong to the National Wild and Scenic Rivers system. The area is famous for its natural environment and recreational activities such as whitewater rafting and fishing. Impoundment of the river in 1911 removed 33 miles (53 km) of steelhead habitat and 14 miles (23 km) of salmon habitat.

The Condit Hydroelectric Project, named after its lead engineer B.C. Condit, was built by Northwestern Electric Company in 1913. During the construction, all 242 workers at the project went on strike and voted unanimously for the strike to be managed by the Industrial Workers of the World. Their demands were 25-cent per day pay raise, better food and accommodations, and an end to discrimination against the workers.

Once complete, electricity was primarily supplied to the Crown Willamette Paper Company in Camas, Washington, and surplus power was sold to Portland customers via a power line across the Columbia River. The project was acquired in 1947 by its current owner, PacifiCorp.

The facility consisted of Condit Dam 45°46′02″N 121°32′16″W in Klickitat County, and its impoundment, Northwestern Lake; a woodstave pipeline that transported water to a surge tank and auxiliary spillway; two penstocks; and the powerhouse. Two horizontally mounted Francis turbines and generators produced electrical power, and the exhausted water rejoined the river about a mile downstream of the dam.

The original design had fish ladders, which were twice destroyed by floods shortly after the dam's completion. The Washington State Fisheries Department then required Northwestern Electric to participate in a fish hatchery instead of rebuilding the fish ladders. This ended natural salmonid migration on the river.

In 1996, the federal government ordered PacifiCorp to alter the dam and add fish ladders to meet environmental codes. PacifiCorp deemed the modifications too expensive, and asked to decommission the dam, instead. The project operated under annual license extensions until the Federal Energy Regulatory Commission (FERC) approved decommissioning. The dam was breached at noon (Pacific Time) on October 26, 2011 then was removed completely.

At the time, it was the largest U.S. dam to be removed. The Elwha Ecosystem Restoration Project on the Olympic Peninsula has since removed the larger Elwha and Glines Canyon Dams.

== Plant operations and specifications ==
=== River flow ===
Condit Dam was required to discharge at least 15 ft³/s (0.4 m³/s) to keep the river channel viable. Surplus water was used by the turbines for electrical power generation and returned to the river about a mile downstream. Additional flow beyond what the turbines could use was discharged through five tainter gates and two sluice gates. The dam crest had a pneumatically actuated hinged crest gate, which was designed to fail catastrophically as a safety relief when flow exceeds 18000 ft³/s (510 m³/s). The river averages 1125 ft³/s (32 m³/s), with flows up to 3500 ft³/s (99 m³/s) being fairly common.

=== Power production ===
The two turbines could use a maximum of 1,400 ft³/s (40 m³/s) and operate efficiently with as little as 1,100 ft³/s (31 m³/s). In this flow range, the plant operated as a run-of-river project. Inflow equaled outflow, and both turbines operated continuously to supply base load electricity.

When river flow was not quite enough for two turbines, operation was cycled between running one and both turbines, based on a daily reservoir draw-down and refill cycle. The cycling was timed to meet peak electrical demands; both turbines operated during hours of high electrical demand and the reservoir was drawn down. A single turbine operated during low electrical demand hours while the reservoir refilled. A similar cycle was used when inflow was less than enough for a single turbine. A weekly cycle was superimposed on the daily cycle that tended to draw down the reservoir during the week and allowed it refill during the weekend. In these cases, known as load factoring, the plant operated as a peaking plant. This mode of operation was greatly reduced through the 1980s and 1990s to appease lakefront cabin owners.

=== Licensing ===
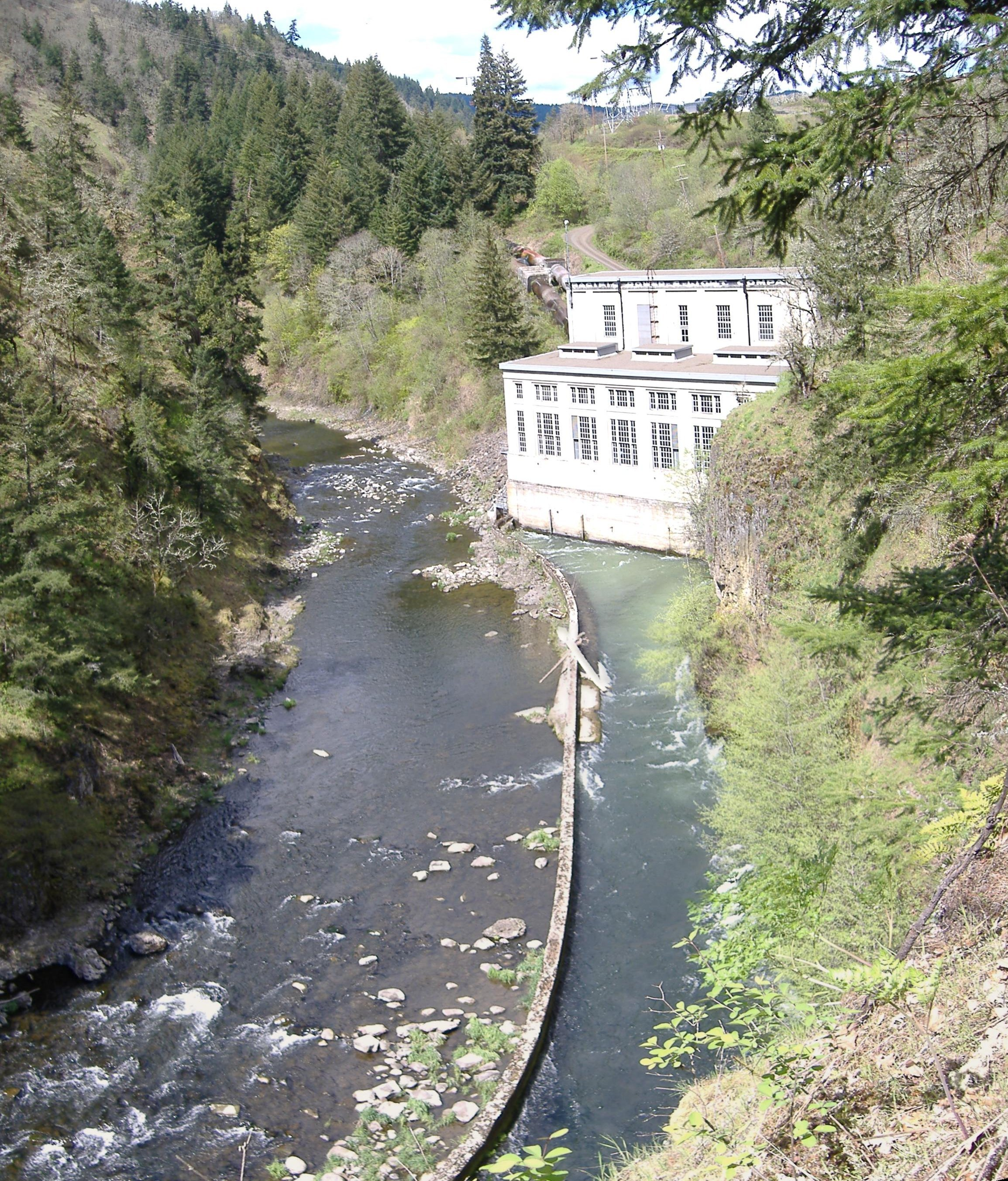
Condit Powerhouse

According to Federal Power Act of 1920, hydropower producers are periodically required to apply for license renewal from FERC. Condit's license was last reviewed in 1991, when it failed approval, and expired in 1993. From 1993 until 2011, PacifiCorp operated the plant under annual license extensions while it sought approval from FERC for the decommissioning.

In December 2005, PacifiCorp filed an appeal of FERC's 1991 license rejection under the Bush administration's 2005 energy bill, which allows power producers to challenge licensing requirements retroactively. PacifiCorp explained the appeal as a backup plan in case decommissioning application failed.

Specifications
| FERC number | 2342 |
| Dam type | Gravity dam, 471 feet (144 m) long, 125 feet (38 m) high |
| Location | Mile 3.3 (km 5.3) |
| Concrete used for construction | 30,000 cubic yards (23,000 m³) |
| Floodgates | Five Tainter, two sluice, one hinged crest gate |
| Pipeline | 13.5 ft (4.1 m) dia, 5,100 ft (1,600 m) long, wood stave |
| Penstocks | 2 x 9 ft (2.7 m) dia x 650 ft (200 m), steel and wood stave |
| Turbines | 2 x Francis |
| Tailrace | concrete lined, 350 ft (110 m) |
| Maximum generating capacity | 14.7 MW |
| Maximum turbine hydraulic capacity | 1400 ft³/s (40 m³/s) |
| Hydraulic head | 167.8 ft (51.1 m) |
| Operation modes | peaking or baseload, depending on available flow |
| Normal lake maximum elevation above SL | 295.2 |
| Reservoir capacity | 1,300 acre⋅ft (1.6 million m^{3}) |
| Useful reservoir storage capacity | 665 acre⋅ft (820 thousand m^{3}) |
| Surface area | 92 acres (370 thousand m^{2}) |
| Average annual energy production (1936–1989) | 79,700 MWh |
| Annual operating costs | $400,000 |
| Annual power benefits | $2,896,000 |
| Annual value of power at consumer rates | $4.8 million ($0.06/kWh) |

== Decommissioning ==
=== FERC proposals ===
After PacifiCorp's license application failed in 1993, FERC prepared an environmental impact statement that proposed installation of a state-of-the-art fish passage system as conditions for license renewal. The enhancements were to include fish ladders to allow upstream migrations of spawning salmon, and other modifications of the dam and operating procedures to allow a 95% survival rate of downstream migrating salmon. These conditions were based on National Marine Fisheries Service requirements. FERC's report also reviewed options to decommissioning the project, which it estimated would cost twice as much as the fish passage system.

The investment needed to comply with the new requirements was estimated at $30 to $50 million, while at the same time reducing the amount of water available for power production. PacifiCorp decided the project was no longer economically viable, and began negotiations for decommissioning. In 1999, PacifiCorp announced an agreement had been reached, at which point they applied to FERC for approval. The plan called for dam removal to begin in 2006 and capped PacifiCorp's liability at $17.5 million. In 2005, they applied for an operating extension to 2008, to earn another $3.3 million to help offset the cost of dam removal. The main parties involved in negotiations were federal regulatory bodies such as the National Marine Fisheries Service, Native American tribal governments with interests in the area, and a number of local and national environmental groups.

=== PacifiCorp proposal ===
PacifiCorp's decommissioning plan differed from FERC's decommissioning proposal in how the sediment behind the dam is treated. FERC's plan was to dredge or bypass the sediment while PacifiCorp's plan used the demolition of the dam to quickly flush as much sediment as possible, thereby minimizing the amount of time the sediment plume harmed downstream aquatic life.

Breaching the dam involved cutting a 12 x 18 x 100-foot (30 m) tunnel in its base; the final 15 feet (4.6 m) was drilled and blasted. A dredge removed woody sediment from the dam's inside face, and when breached, the reservoir was expected to drain within six hours, but actually drained much faster, in only about 30 minutes. The rest of the dam was cut into blocks and removed for disposal or recycling on-site. As of the date of demolition, Condit dam was the largest dam ever removed for environmental reasons and the largest dam ever removed in the United States.

The quick drainage of the reservoir flushed a large amount of sediment quickly, helping to create a new river channel above the dam. The remaining sediment will continue to erode until vegetation takes root. The sediment plume will harm the aquatic ecosystem temporarily; in the case of bull trout, it will be a negative influence for two years, after which it will be a positive influence due to improved ecosystem nutrition. Also, a new sand bar is expected to form at the mouth of the White Salmon River, interfering with Native American fishing rights, for which PacifiCorp will pay a settlement.

=== Controversy ===
Opposition to the dam removal came from Klickitat and Skamania County governments. Objections revolved around the loss of lake-front property and water recreation, loss of wetlands and water habitat, and a perception that PacifiCorp was choosing the cheapest way to abandon the project, rather than paying for FERC's preferred solution (a fish passage system), which some believed was the best solution for all parties.

The Klickitat Public Utility District Board of Commissioners investigated acquiring the project from Pacificorp to continue its operation as a power plant. A 2002 study commissioned from CH2M Hill calculated that purchasing and upgrading as required by FERC would have led to power production at $64 per MWh, and that for the project to be economically viable, it would have to have produced power at $45 to $50 per MWh. The report further stated that power produced at Condit would have been more expensive than a gas-fired plant for more than 20 years after its acquisition.

In July 2006, KPUD and Skamania County announced a new effort to acquire the project from PacifiCorp and preserve the dam. Their plan relied on trucking spawning salmon around the dam as a less expensive alternative to fish ladders. This type of proposal was previously rejected by FERC.

The sediment plume was expected to kill some aquatic life below the dam and displace fish as far downstream as Bonneville dam. It could also harm several generations of a threatened chum salmon population.

Most environmental groups involved with the decommissioning plan, as well as the National Forest Service, believed that the long-term benefits of removing the dam far outweighed the short-term damage done by flushed sedimentation. Some fish and environmental advocates see this case as an important precedent for dam removals to restore free-flowing rivers.
