= Conboy Lake National Wildlife Refuge =

National Wildlife Refuge in Washington, US

- IUCN category IV (habitat/species management area)
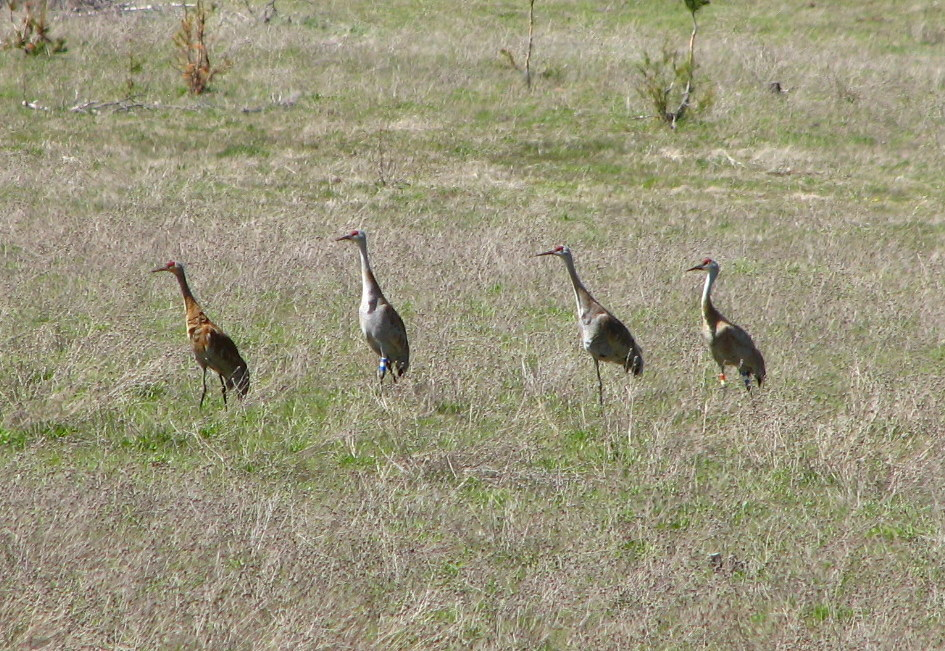
- Sandhill cranes on the refuge

- Location within Washington (state)
- Location: Klickitat County, Washington
- Nearest town: Trout Lake, Washington
- Coordinates: 45.9581777°N 121.3178548°W
- Area: 7,071.70 acres (2,861.82 ha)
- Established: 1964
- Governing body: U.S. Fish and Wildlife Service
- Website: Conboy Lake National Wildlife Refuge

Conboy Lake National Wildlife Refuge is located on the east slope of the Cascade Mountains at the base of 12,281-foot (3,743 m) Mount Adams in southern Washington state.

It encompasses 7,071.70 acres (2,861.82 ha) on the lakebeds of the historic Conboy and Camas lakes, a shallow marshy wetland area drained by early settlers. Conifer forests, grasslands, shallow wetlands, and deep water provide homes for raccoon, deer, marten, elk, coyote, muskrat, skunk, cougar, beaver, porcupine, river otter, small rodents, and 150 species of birds, as well as numerous amphibians, reptiles, and fish.

Bald eagle, greater sandhill crane, and the Oregon spotted frog are species of concern. Refuge visitors enjoy the scenery, hike the Willard Springs trail, and observe wildlife from the county roads that surround and cross the refuge.

Each spring, juvenile sandhill cranes, called colts, can be observed from near the refuge headquarters and from the nearby roads. When the birds are very young they are difficult to see because the adult birds try to hide their offspring from predators. Visitors are encouraged to observe from a distance and in such a way that their presence does not threaten the survival of the birds.
