= Mount Adams Wilderness =

Wilderness area in Washington, United States

- IUCN category Ib (wilderness area)
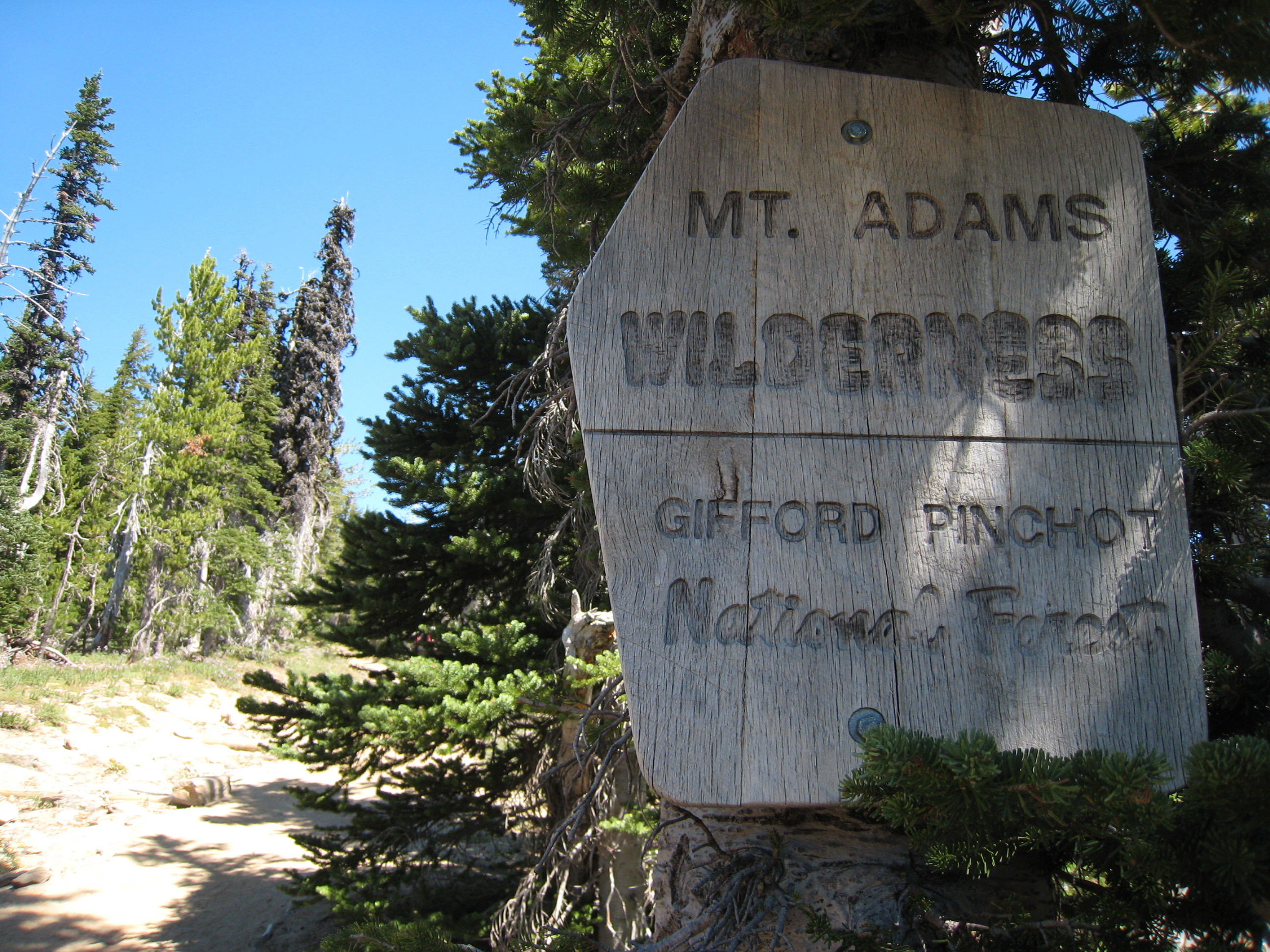

- Location within the United States
- Location: Yakima / Skamania counties, Washington, USA
- Nearest city: Trout Lake, WA
- Coordinates: 46°12′8.68″N 121°29′27.22″W
- Area: 47,708 acres (19,307 ha)
- Established: 1964
- Governing body: United States Forest Service
- Website: Mount Adams Wilderness

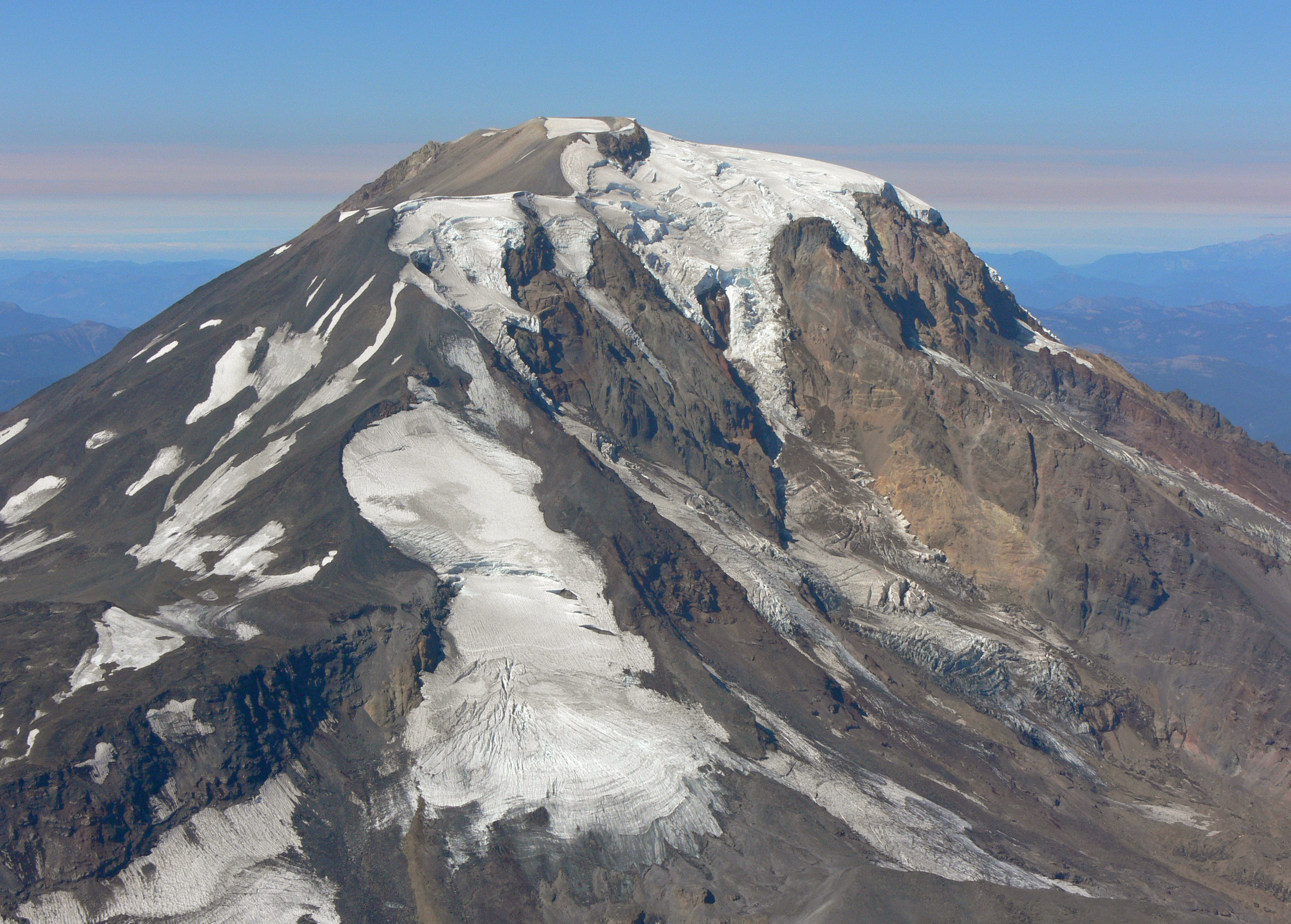
The South Climb, or South Spur climbing route on Mount Adams along Suksdorf Ridge

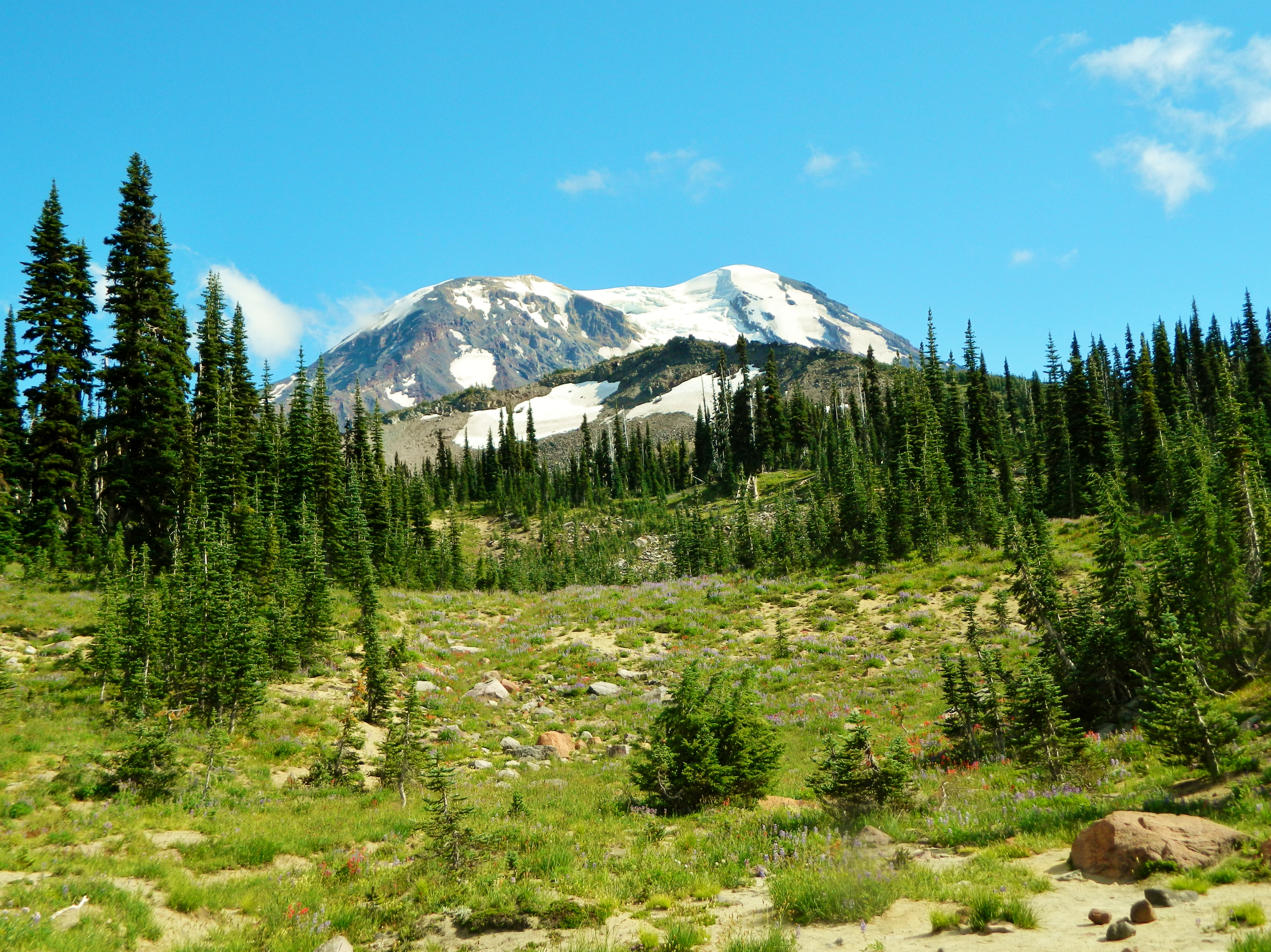
Meadows at Mount Adams Wilderness

The Mount Adams Wilderness is a 47,708-acre (19,307 ha) wilderness area in the U.S. state of Washington managed by the U.S. Forest Service. The wilderness encompasses an ecologically complex and geologically active landscape. Weather differs between the dry eastside and moist westside of the mountain. At 12,276 feet (3,742 m), Mount Adams is the second tallest mountain in Washington State and one of the tallest in the Cascade Range. The wilderness area is on the west side of the mountain and is part of the Gifford Pinchot National Forest. The east side of the mountain is part of the Yakama Nation, with the southeast side part of the Mount Adams Recreation Area, and includes Bird Creek Meadows.

== Recreation ==
Recreation includes hiking, backpacking, mountain climbing, and equestrian sports. A Volcano Pass from the U.S. Forest Service is required for activities above 7,000 feet (2,100 m). Some areas of the mountain in the Yakama Nation are open for recreation, while other areas are open only to members of the tribe. The wilderness includes about 21 miles (34 km) of the Pacific Crest National Scenic Trail, which passes to the west and north Mount Adams.

=== Climbing ===
Each year, hundreds of people attempt to summit Mount Adams. Crampons and ice axes are needed on many routes because of the glaciers and how steep they are. But it is possible to climb with just boots and ski poles on the south side of the mountain in the summer, via the South Climb Spur, partway on the South Climb Trail #183. The biggest hazard is the loose rocks and boulders which are easily dislodged and a severe hazard for climbers below. Climbing Mount Adams can be dangerous for a variety of reasons and people do die in pursuit of the summit.

=== Hiking ===
The Mount Adams Wilderness has a number of hiking trails. Trails in the wilderness pass through dry east-side and moist west-side forests, with views of Mt. Adams and its glaciers, streams, open alpine forests, parklands, and wildflowers which speckle the lava flows and rimrocks.

Many trails access the Round the Mountain trail. On the south, the Shorthorn Trail leaves from near the Morrison Creek Campground and the South Climb Trail starts as Cold Springs Campground and heads up the South Spur, a common climbing route to the summit. On the west side, there are three trails going up: the Stagman Ridge Trail, Pacific Crest Trail, and the Riley Creek Trail. On the north side are the Divide Camp, Killen Creek, Muddy Meadows trails, and the Pacific Crest Trail as it heads down the mountain. These trails generally gain between 1,500 feet (460 m) and 3,000 feet (910 m) in between 3 miles (4.8 km) and 6 miles (9.7 km). Trails are mostly snow-covered from early winter until early summer. The Round the Mountain Trail, the Pacific Crest Trail, and the Highline Trail almost completely encircle the mountain, save for a 4-mile section known as "The Gap" on the east side of the Mountain, in the Mount Adams Recreation Area. Other trails in the Mount Adams Wilderness include the Lookingglass Lake Trail, High Camp Trail #10, Salt Creek Trail #75, Crofton Butte Trail #73, and the Riley Connector Trail #64A.

== Climate ==
Potato Hill is a cinder cone on Adams' north side that was created in the late Pleistocene and stands 800 feet (240 m) above its lava plain. It has a weather station that was monitored monthly from 1950 to 1976 and was replaced in 1982 with the automated precipitation sensor. It was upgraded in 1983 to report snow water equivalent and it was upgraded again in 2006 to report snow depth.

By April, there is, on average, 87 inches (220 cm) of snow on the ground at Potato Hill. The average monthly snow depth at Potato Hill has not changed much from the records collected from 1950 to 1976, with only a small decrease in January, February, and May and a small increase in March and April. The snowpack at Potato Hill starts building in late October to early November and the last of the snow generally melts by the beginning of June, but occasionally lingers into July.

Temperatures and precipitation can be highly variable around Adams, due in part to its geographic location astride the Cascade Crest, which gives it more of a continental influence than some of its neighbors. At Potato Hill, December is the coldest month with an average high of 45 °F (7 °C) and an average low of 6 °F (−14 °C). July is the hottest month with an average high of 84 °F (29 °C) and an average low of 33 °F (1 °C). The highest recorded temperature is 95 °F (35 °C) on June 29, 2021, and the lowest is −16 °F (−27 °C) on November 24, 2010. Average annual precipitation is 66.8 inches (1,700 mm) with January being the wettest month at 10.3 inches (26 cm), slightly more than November and December. Potato Hill averages 159 precipitation days with 53 snow days.

Climate data for Potato Hill, WA, elev. 4,510 feet (1,375 m) 46.35°N 121.51°W
Month	Jan	Feb	Mar	Apr	May	Jun	Jul	Aug	Sep	Oct	Nov	Dec	Year
Record high °F (°C)	56 (13)	68 (20)	64 (18)	74 (23)	82 (28)	95 (35)	90 (32)	91 (33)	88 (31)	78 (26)	65 (18)	56 (13)	95 (35)
Mean daily maximum °F (°C)	47.5 (8.6)	48.3 (9.1)	55.1 (12.8)	62.7 (17.1)	72.1 (22.3)	78.5 (25.8)	83.8 (28.8)	83.8 (28.8)	78.4 (25.8)	66.0 (18.9)	52.8 (11.6)	45.3 (7.4)	64.5 (18.1)
Mean daily minimum °F (°C)	7.8 (−13.4)	4.9 (−15.1)	11.5 (−11.4)	16.3 (−8.7)	24.8 (−4.0)	30.0 (−1.1)	33.0 (0.6)	31.7 (−0.2)	29.0 (−1.7)	21.7 (−5.7)	12.4 (−10.9)	5.5 (−14.7)	19.0 (−7.2)
Record low °F (°C)	−7 (−22)	−12 (−24)	4 (−16)	3 (−16)	17 (−8)	24 (−4)	28 (−2)	25 (−4)	21 (−6)	12 (−11)	−16 (−27)	−14 (−26)	−16 (−27)
Average precipitation inches (mm)	10.3 (260)	7.58 (193)	7.51 (191)	4.82 (122)	3.91 (99)	2.50 (64)	0.83 (21)	1.04 (26)	2.52 (64)	5.65 (144)	10.0 (250)	10.1 (260)	66.79 (1,696)
Average snowfall inches (cm)	35.6 (90)	41.6 (106)	33.1 (84)	17.6 (45)	6.4 (16)	1 (2.5)	0 (0)	0 (0)	0 (0)	5.1 (13)	30.1 (76)	47 (120)	217.1 (551)
Average precipitation days (≥ 0.01 in)	19	16	19	15	14	9	4	4	8	13	19	19	159
Average snowy days (≥ 0.1 in)	9	9	9	5	1	0	0	0	0	2	7	11	53
Source: Natural Resources Conservation Service (1982–2022)
