= Avalanche Glacier =

Glacier in Washington, United States

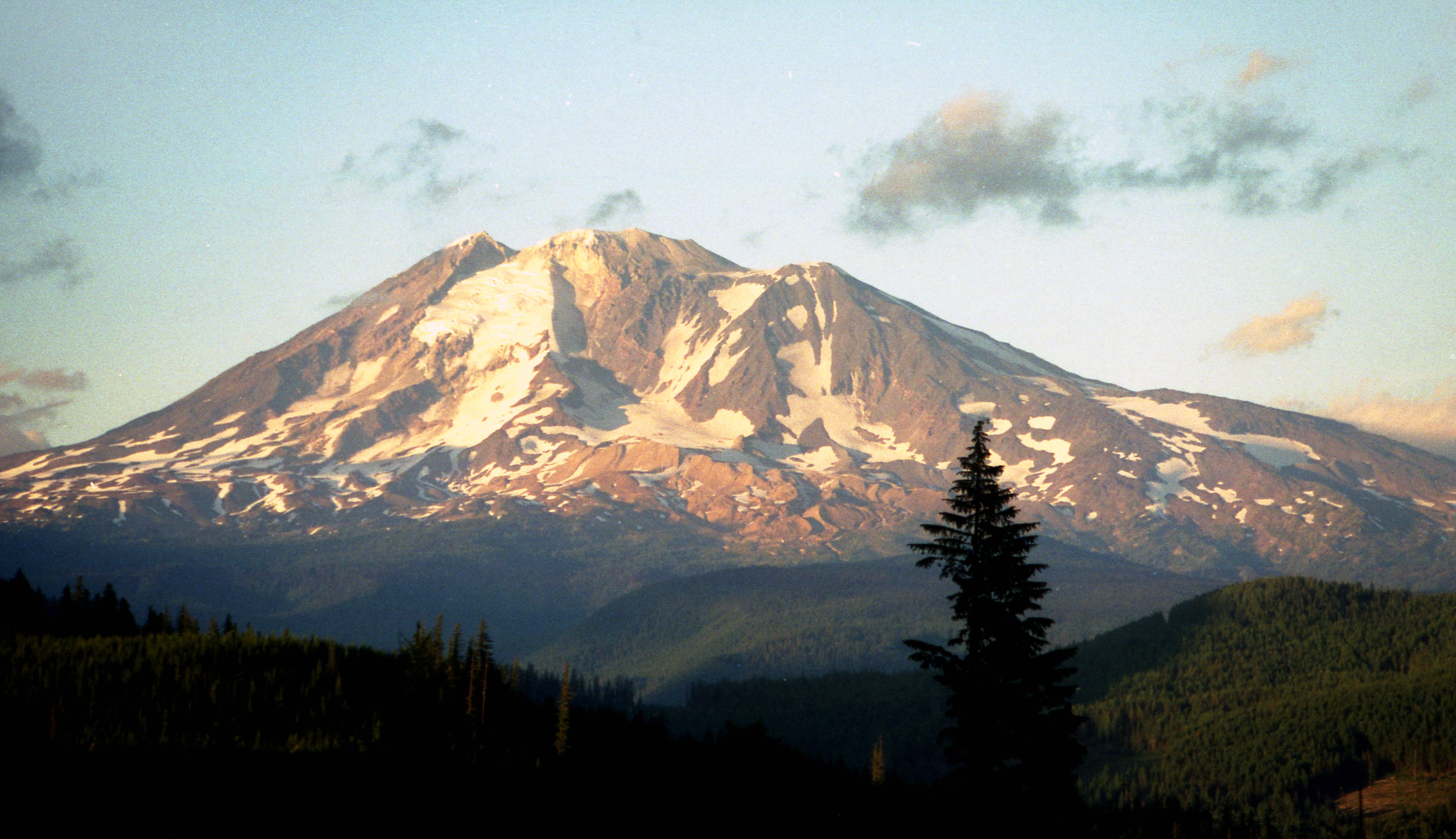
- Avalanche Glacier can be seen in the center of the photo. It is fed by the White Salmon Glacier, which is located to the upper-left of Avalanche Glacier.

- Location within Washington (state) Location within the United States
- Type: Mountain glacier
- Location: Yakima County, Washington, USA
- Coordinates: 46°11′04″N 121°30′36″W
- Area: 0.86 km^{2} (0.33 sq mi) in 2006
- Length: 1 mi (1.6 km)
- Terminus: Talus
- Status: Retreating

Avalanche Glacier is located on the west to southwest slopes of Mount Adams a stratovolcano in the Gifford Pinchot National Forest in the U.S. state of Washington. The glacier descends from the White Salmon Glacier at 10,200 ft (3,100 m) to a terminus near 7,600 ft (2,300 m). Avalanche Glacier has been in a general state of retreat for over 100 years and lost 59 percent of its surface area between 1904 and 2006. Avalanche Glacier is also known for its yellowish-brown rocks that descend along the glaciers path.

== See also ==
- List of glaciers in the United States
