= White Salmon Glacier (Mount Adams) =

Glacier in Washington, United States

- Location within Washington (state) Location within the United States
- Type: Mountain glacier
- Location: Mount Adams, Yakima County, Washington, USA
- Coordinates: 46°11′59″N 121°30′10″W
- Area: 0.51 km^{2} (0.20 sq mi) in 2006
- Length: .60 mi (0.97 km)
- Terminus: Icefall
- Status: Retreating

White Salmon Glacier is located on Mount Adams in the U.S. state of Washington. The glacier starts southwest of the summit crater at an elevation of 11,600 ft (3,500 m). Ice flows southwest downhill until the glacier's terminus at about 9,600 ft (2,900 m) elevation. The glacier also contributes ice to the much larger Avalanche Glacier at an elevation of 10,200 ft (3,100 m). White Salmon Glacier has decreased in surface area by 86 percent between 1904 and 2006.

== See also ==
- List of glaciers in the United States
