= Husum, Washington =

Unincorporated community in Washington, United States

- Unincorporated community
- Location within Washington (state) Location within the United States
- Coordinates: 45°47′57″N 121°29′13″W
- Country: United States
- State: Washington
- County: Klickitat
- Elevation: 413 ft (126 m)
- Time zone: UTC-8 (Pacific (PST))
  - Summer (DST): UTC-7 (PDT)
- ZIP code: 98623
- Area code: 509
- GNIS feature ID: 1515932

Husum is an unincorporated community in the White Salmon River Valley in the state of Washington.

Under the bridge in Husum, Washington, just miles from Hood River, Oregon and the scenic Columbia Gorge, Husum Falls is a vertical 10-foot (3.0 m) Class V waterfall.
