= Glenwood, Klickitat County, Washington =

Unincorporated community in Washington, United States

Glenwood, Washington
- Census-designated place
- Location within Washington (state) Location within the United States
- Coordinates: 46°01′22″N 121°17′33″W
- Country: United States
- State: Washington
- County: Klickitat
- Elevation: 1,919 ft (585 m)
- Time zone: UTC-8 (Pacific (PST))
  - Summer (DST): UTC-7 (PDT)
- ZIP code: 98619
- Area code: 509
- FIPS code: 53-27226
- GNIS feature ID: 2585643

Glenwood is an unincorporated community and census-designated place (CDP) in Klickitat County, Washington, United States. It is 26.5 miles (42.6 km) west-northwest of Goldendale and has a post office with ZIP code 98619. The community is on land whose jurisdiction is disputed between the Yakama Nation and Klickitat County.

The community was named for the glen and woods near the original town site.

Glenwood was the site of a fatal black bear attack of four year old Victoria Valdez near her home in 1974.

The population of Glenwood in 2020 was 179.

== Climate ==
Glenwood has a warm-summer Mediterranean climate (Csb) according to the Köppen climate classification system.

Climate data for Glenwood, Washington, 1991–2020 normals: 1902ft (580m)
Month	Jan	Feb	Mar	Apr	May	Jun	Jul	Aug	Sep	Oct	Nov	Dec	Year
Mean daily maximum °F (°C)	41.2 (5.1)	45.7 (7.6)	52.1 (11.2)	58.3 (14.6)	68.5 (20.3)	74.3 (23.5)	83.6 (28.7)	83.9 (28.8)	76.6 (24.8)	63.3 (17.4)	49.0 (9.4)	39.7 (4.3)	61.4 (16.3)
Daily mean °F (°C)	32.4 (0.2)	35.4 (1.9)	39.9 (4.4)	44.3 (6.8)	52.2 (11.2)	57.3 (14.1)	63.6 (17.6)	63.3 (17.4)	56.0 (13.3)	45.9 (7.7)	37.8 (3.2)	31.8 (−0.1)	46.7 (8.1)
Mean daily minimum °F (°C)	23.6 (−4.7)	25.1 (−3.8)	27.8 (−2.3)	30.3 (−0.9)	35.9 (2.2)	40.2 (4.6)	43.6 (6.4)	42.7 (5.9)	35.5 (1.9)	28.6 (−1.9)	26.6 (−3.0)	23.8 (−4.6)	32.0 (0.0)
Average precipitation inches (mm)	5.25 (133)	3.50 (89)	3.08 (78)	1.28 (33)	1.41 (36)	0.58 (15)	0.27 (6.9)	0.46 (12)	0.91 (23)	2.79 (71)	4.18 (106)	6.09 (155)	29.8 (757.9)
Average snowfall inches (cm)	22.20 (56.4)	7.10 (18.0)	6.00 (15.2)	0.10 (0.25)	0.00 (0.00)	0.00 (0.00)	0.00 (0.00)	0.00 (0.00)	0.00 (0.00)	0.30 (0.76)	6.20 (15.7)	23.40 (59.4)	65.3 (165.71)
Source: NOAA

== Land dispute ==
Ownership of this area has been in dispute dating back to the Treaty of 1855. An 1890 survey of the Yakama Reservation, accepted by the United States General Land Office, did not include the area known as "Tract-D". The original treaty map, which included the Tract-D area, was found in 1930 after being misplaced for decades. In the meantime 98,000 acres (400 km^{2}) of the Glenwood Valley had passed into private ownership. Another 21,000 acres (85 km^{2}) were part of the Gifford Pinchot National Forest administered by the United States Department of Agriculture. After more than 100 years of dispute, in 1972 President Richard Nixon by Executive Order 11670 authorized the return of the 21,000 acre portion of Mt. Adams, including the summit, to the Yakama Nation. The area returned to the Yakama Nation did not include the 98,000 acres of Tract D in the Glenwood Valley. The Yakama Nation accepted $2.1 million in 1970 for their claims.

In 2022, Klickitat County’s claim that Glenwood is not part of the Yakama reservation was rejected by the United States Supreme Court.

== Demographics ==
Historical population
Census	Pop.	Note	%±
2020	179		—
U.S. Decennial Census

Glenwood CDP, Washington – Racial and ethnic composition Note: the US Census treats Hispanic/Latino as an ethnic category. This table excludes Latinos from the racial categories and assigns them to a separate category. Hispanics/Latinos may be of any race.
Race / Ethnicity (NH = Non-Hispanic)	Pop 2020	2020
White alone (NH)	144	80.45%
Black or African American alone (NH)	1	0.56%
Native American or Alaska Native alone (NH)	19	10.61%
Asian alone (NH)	0	0.00%
Native Hawaiian or Pacific Islander alone (NH)	0	0.00%
Other race alone (NH)	0	0.00%
Mixed race or Multiracial (NH)	3	1.68%
Hispanic or Latino (any race)	12	6.70%
Total	179	100.00%
