= White Salmon, Washington =

White Salmon
- City
- White Salmon, Washington
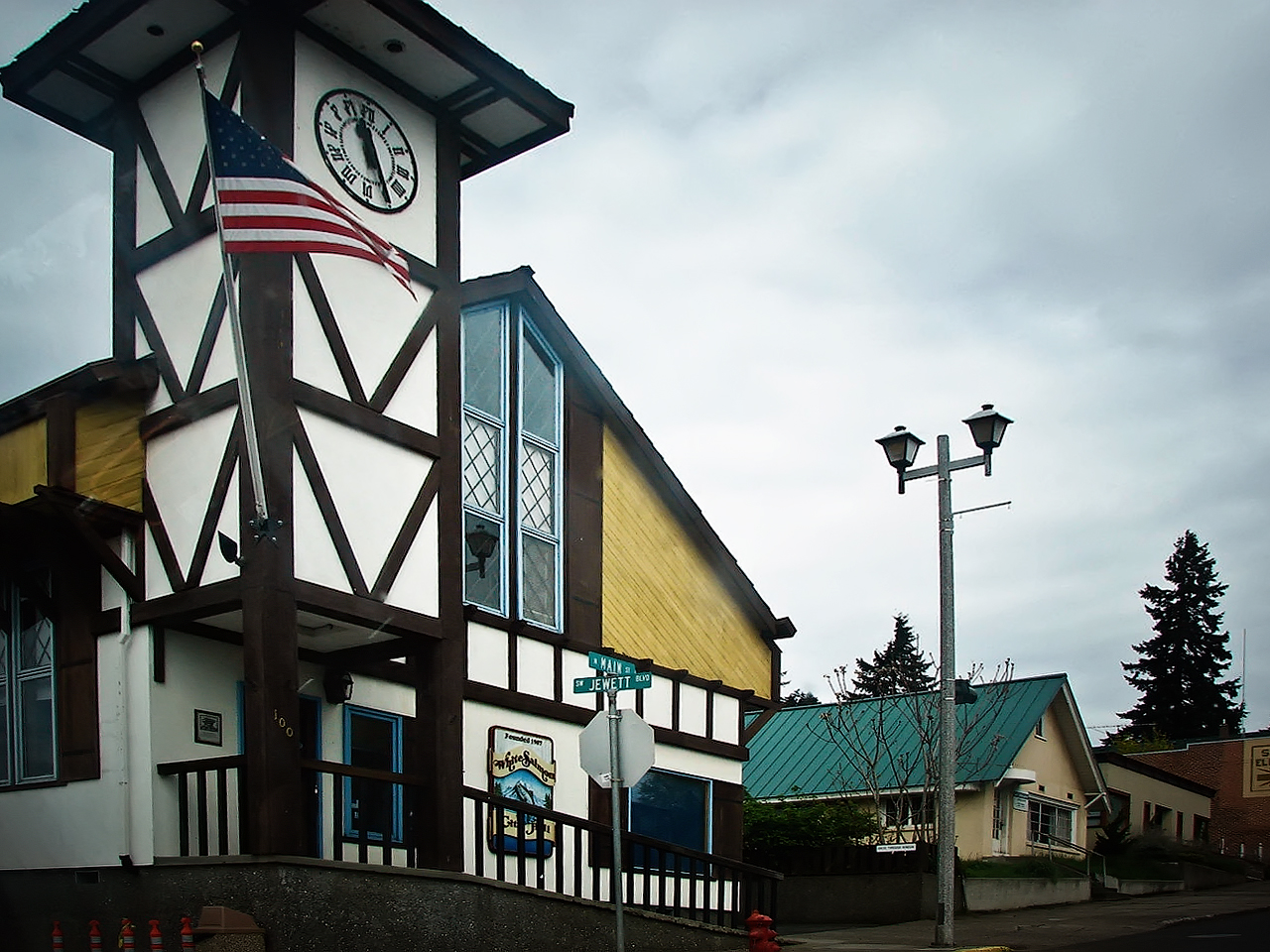
- White Salmon City Hall.
- Nickname: The Land Where The Sun Meets The Rain
- Coordinates: 45°43′44″N 121°29′1″W
- Country: United States
- State: Washington
- County: Klickitat

Government
  - Type: Mayor–council
  - Mayor: Marla Keethler

Area
  - Total: 1.54 sq mi (3.98 km^{2})
  - Land: 1.54 sq mi (3.98 km^{2})
  - Water: 0 sq mi (0.00 km^{2})
- Elevation: 620 ft (190 m)

Population (2020)
  - Total: 2,485
  - Density: 1,620/sq mi (624/km^{2})
- Time zone: UTC-8 (Pacific (PST))
  - Summer (DST): UTC-7 (PDT)
- ZIP code: 98672
- Area code: 509
- FIPS code: 53-78330
- GNIS feature ID: 2412254
- Website: City of White Salmon

White Salmon is a city in Klickitat County, Washington, United States. It is located in the Columbia River Gorge. The population was 2,193 at the 2000 census, increased 1.4% to 2,224 at the 2010 census, and increased 11.7% to 2,485 at the 2020 census.

== History ==
White Salmon was first settled in 1852 by Erastus Joslyn and his wife. White Salmon was officially incorporated on June 3, 1907.

White Salmon was part of the home of the Klickitat Tribe, now a part of the Yakama Confederated Nations. The Klickitat Tribe sold some land to the Joslyns. They were generally Native advocates for the time. The area was thrown open on October 31, 1858, for white settlement after the Klickitat and Yakama lost the fight for their homelands in the Yakama War. Within the same year, the region was very rapidly and heavily settled by white immigrants making land claims. The Klickitat were forced to relocate to the Yakama Reservation.

White Salmon was named after the White Salmon River.

== Government ==
White Salmon's current city government includes Mayor Marla Keethler, first elected in 2019 and re-elected to a four-year term in November 2023.

Current city council members, elected to four-year terms, include Patty Fink (Position 1), David Lindley (Position 2), Jason Hartmann (Position 3), Jim Ransier (Position 4) and Ben Giant (Position 5).

== Geography ==
According to the United States Census Bureau, the city has a total area of 1.22 square miles (3.16 km^{2}), all of it land.

The city is located opposite Hood River, Oregon on the Columbia River.

=== Climate ===
Climate data for White Salmon, Washington
Month	Jan	Feb	Mar	Apr	May	Jun	Jul	Aug	Sep	Oct	Nov	Dec	Year
Record high °F (°C)	63 (17)	68 (20)	81 (27)	90 (32)	102 (39)	105 (41)	115 (46)	108 (42)	100 (38)	89 (32)	69 (21)	66 (19)	115 (46)
Mean daily maximum °F (°C)	42 (6)	47 (8)	55 (13)	61 (16)	69 (21)	74 (23)	82 (28)	82 (28)	76 (24)	64 (18)	50 (10)	40 (4)	62 (17)
Mean daily minimum °F (°C)	31 (−1)	31 (−1)	35 (2)	39 (4)	45 (7)	51 (11)	55 (13)	54 (12)	46 (8)	38 (3)	34 (1)	30 (−1)	41 (5)
Record low °F (°C)	−20 (−29)	−21 (−29)	9 (−13)	23 (−5)	26 (−3)	32 (0)	37 (3)	36 (2)	26 (−3)	15 (−9)	−5 (−21)	−10 (−23)	−21 (−29)
Average precipitation inches (mm)	5.32 (135)	4.06 (103)	3.01 (76)	1.76 (45)	1.30 (33)	0.87 (22)	0.28 (7.1)	0.31 (7.9)	0.92 (23)	2.29 (58)	5.39 (137)	5.91 (150)	31.42 (797)

== Demographics ==
Historical population
Census	Pop.	Note	%±
1910	682		—
1920	619		−9.2%
1930	798		28.9%
1940	985		23.4%
1950	1,353		37.4%
1960	1,590		17.5%
1970	1,585		−0.3%
1980	1,853		16.9%
1990	1,861		0.4%
2000	2,193		17.8%
2010	2,224		1.4%
2020	2,485		11.7%
U.S. Decennial Census

=== 2020 census ===
As of the 2020 census, White Salmon had a population of 2,485. The median age was 42.0 years. 20.1% of residents were under the age of 18 and 20.1% of residents were 65 years of age or older. For every 100 females there were 96.1 males, and for every 100 females age 18 and over there were 94.0 males age 18 and over.

99.4% of residents lived in urban areas, while 0.6% lived in rural areas.

There were 1,082 households in White Salmon, of which 27.5% had children under the age of 18 living in them. Of all households, 46.9% were married-couple households, 19.2% were households with a male householder and no spouse or partner present, and 25.2% were households with a female householder and no spouse or partner present. About 30.3% of all households were made up of individuals and 11.4% had someone living alone who was 65 years of age or older.

There were 1,214 housing units, of which 10.9% were vacant. The homeowner vacancy rate was 1.7% and the rental vacancy rate was 4.2%.

Racial composition as of the 2020 census
Race	Number	Percent
White	1,920	77.3%
Black or African American	2	0.1%
American Indian and Alaska Native	26	1.0%
Asian	22	0.9%
Native Hawaiian and Other Pacific Islander	2	0.1%
Some other race	224	9.0%
Two or more races	289	11.6%
Hispanic or Latino (of any race)	419	16.9%

=== 2010 census ===
At the 2010 census there were 2,224 people in 921 households, including 559 families, in the city. The population density was 1,823.0 inhabitants per square mile (703.9/km^{2}). There were 1,039 housing units at an average density of 851.6 per square mile (328.8/km^{2}). The racial makeup of the city was 78.8% White, 0.3% African American, 1.4% Native American, 0.9% Asian, 14.7% from other races, and 3.9% from two or more races. Hispanic or Latino of any race were 24.4%.

Of the 921 households 31.5% had children under the age of 18 living with them, 45.7% were married couples living together, 10.7% had a female householder with no husband present, 4.2% had a male householder with no wife present, and 39.3% were non-families. 33.1% of households were one person and 14.3% were one person aged 65 or older. The average household size was 2.41 and the average family size was 3.09.

The median age was 38.1 years. 25.6% of residents were under the age of 18; 6.5% were between the ages of 18 and 24; 26.8% were from 25 to 44; 25.2% were from 45 to 64; and 15.8% were 65 or older. The gender makeup of the city was 48.6% male and 51.4% female.

=== 2000 census ===
At the 2000 census there were 2,193 people in 887 households, including 590 families, in the city. The population density was 1,759.2 people per square mile (677.4/km^{2}). There were 948 housing units at an average density of 760.5 per square mile (292.8/km^{2}). The racial makeup of the city was 83.08% White, 0.23% African American, 1.14% Native American, 0.73% Asian, 0.09% Pacific Islander, 12.04% from other races, and 2.69% from two or more races. Hispanic or Latino of any race were 16.83%.

Of the 887 households 34.4% had children under the age of 18 living with them, 50.1% were married couples living together, 12.3% had a female householder with no husband present, and 33.4% were non-families. 29.7% of households were one person and 14.2% were one person aged 65 or older. The average household size was 2.46 and the average family size was 3.03.

The age distribution was 28.7% under the age of 18, 7.0% from 18 to 24, 28.2% from 25 to 44, 20.4% from 45 to 64, and 15.7% 65 or older. The median age was 37 years. For every 100 females, there were 93.0 males. For every 100 females age 18 and over, there were 84.7 males.

The median household income was $34,787 and the median family income was $39,653. Males had a median income of $33,021 versus $20,417 for females. The per capita income for the city was $17,995. About 13.0% of families and 16.7% of the population were below the poverty line, including 23.6% of those under age 18 and 12.8% of those age 65 or over.
