= White Salmon River =

American river in the state of Washington

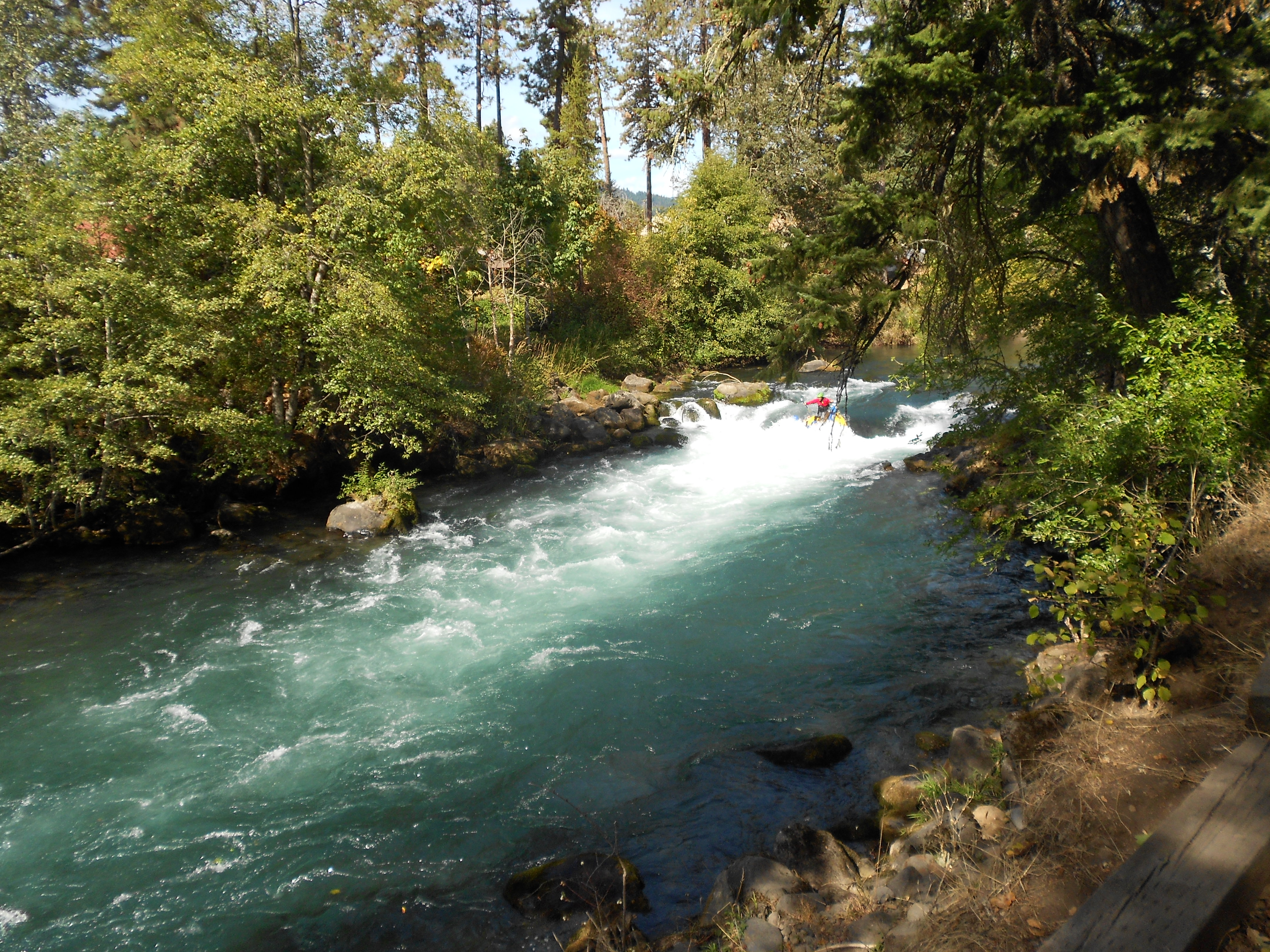

- Location of the mouth of the White Salmon River in Washington

Location
- Country: United States
- State: Washington
- County: Klickitat, Skamania

Physical characteristics
- Source: Mount Adams Wilderness
  - location: Gifford Pinchot National Forest, Klickitat County, Cascade Range
  - coordinates: 46°11′10″N 121°35′05″W
  - elevation: 5,381 ft (1,640 m)
- Mouth: Columbia River
  - location: Columbia River Gorge near Underwood, Skamania County
  - coordinates: 45°43′43″N 121°31′16″W
  - elevation: 79 ft (24 m)
- Length: 44.3 mi (71.3 km)
- Basin size: 400 sq mi (1,000 km^{2})
- Discharge
  - location: Underwood, Washington
  - average: 1,075 cuft/s
  - minimum: 482 cuft/s
  - maximum: 2,612 cuft/s

National Wild and Scenic River
- Type: Wild, Scenic
- Designated: November 17, 1986

The White Salmon River is a 44-mile (71 km) tributary of the Columbia River in the U.S. state of Washington. Originating on the slopes of Mount Adams, it flows into the Columbia Gorge near the community of Underwood. Parts of the river have been designated Wild and Scenic. The principal tributaries of the White Salmon River include Trout Lake and Buck, Mill, Dry, Gilmer, and Rattlesnake Creeks.

== Wild and Scenic ==
In 1986, the lower White Salmon River was designated Wild and Scenic between Gilmer Creek and Buck Creek. In 2005, the upper river between the headwaters and the boundary of the Gifford Pinchot National Forest was added to the designation. The two reaches, which are not contiguous, total 27.7 miles (44.6 km), of which 6.7 miles (10.8 km) are "wild" and 22.3 miles (35.9 km) are "scenic." On the upper stretches of the White Salmon River near the Trout Lake Farming Community there are a few irrigation dams on the White Salmon River. These irrigation dams may be full/partial barriers to resident trout populations.

== Recreation ==
The White Salmon River is used for whitewater boating nearly year-round. A popular spot to launch a raft or kayak is the public put-in at the unincorporated community of BZ Corner. The day-use area at the put-in includes parking, restrooms, and toilets. Full day whitewater tours will also take visitors rafting through the former Condit Dam/Northwestern Lake portion of the White Salmon River and to the Columbia River confluence. Guided whitewater trips can be arranged with commercial outfitters with special-use permits for the White Salmon.

== Condit Dam demolition ==
On October 26, 2011, the Condit Dam on the White Salmon River was intentionally breached as part of the dam's decommissioning by PacifiCorp. The breach allowed the river to flow unimpeded for the first time in nearly a century.

== See also ==
- List of Washington rivers
- List of National Wild and Scenic Rivers
- Condit Hydroelectric Project
- Tributaries of the Columbia River
- Trout Lake Mudflow
