= Trout Lake, Washington =

- Census-designated place
- Location of Trout Lake in Klickitat County, Washington
- Coordinates: 45°59′44″N 121°31′14″W
- Country: United States
- State: Washington
- County: Klickitat

Area
  - Total: 6.98 sq mi (18.08 km^{2})
  - Land: 6.94 sq mi (17.97 km^{2})
  - Water: 0.042 sq mi (0.11 km^{2})
- Elevation: 1,900 ft (580 m)

Population (2020)
  - Total: 672
  - Density: 96.9/sq mi (37.4/km^{2})
- Time zone: UTC-8 (Pacific (PST))
  - Summer (DST): UTC-7 (PDT)
- ZIP code: 98650
- Area code: 509
- FIPS code: 53-72450
- GNIS feature ID: 2409351

Trout Lake is an unincorporated community and census-designated place (CDP) in Klickitat County, Washington, United States. The population was 672 at the 2020 census. The town is notable for its organic dairy and herb farms, and as an access point to Mount Adams and the Gifford Pinchot National Forest.

== Geography ==
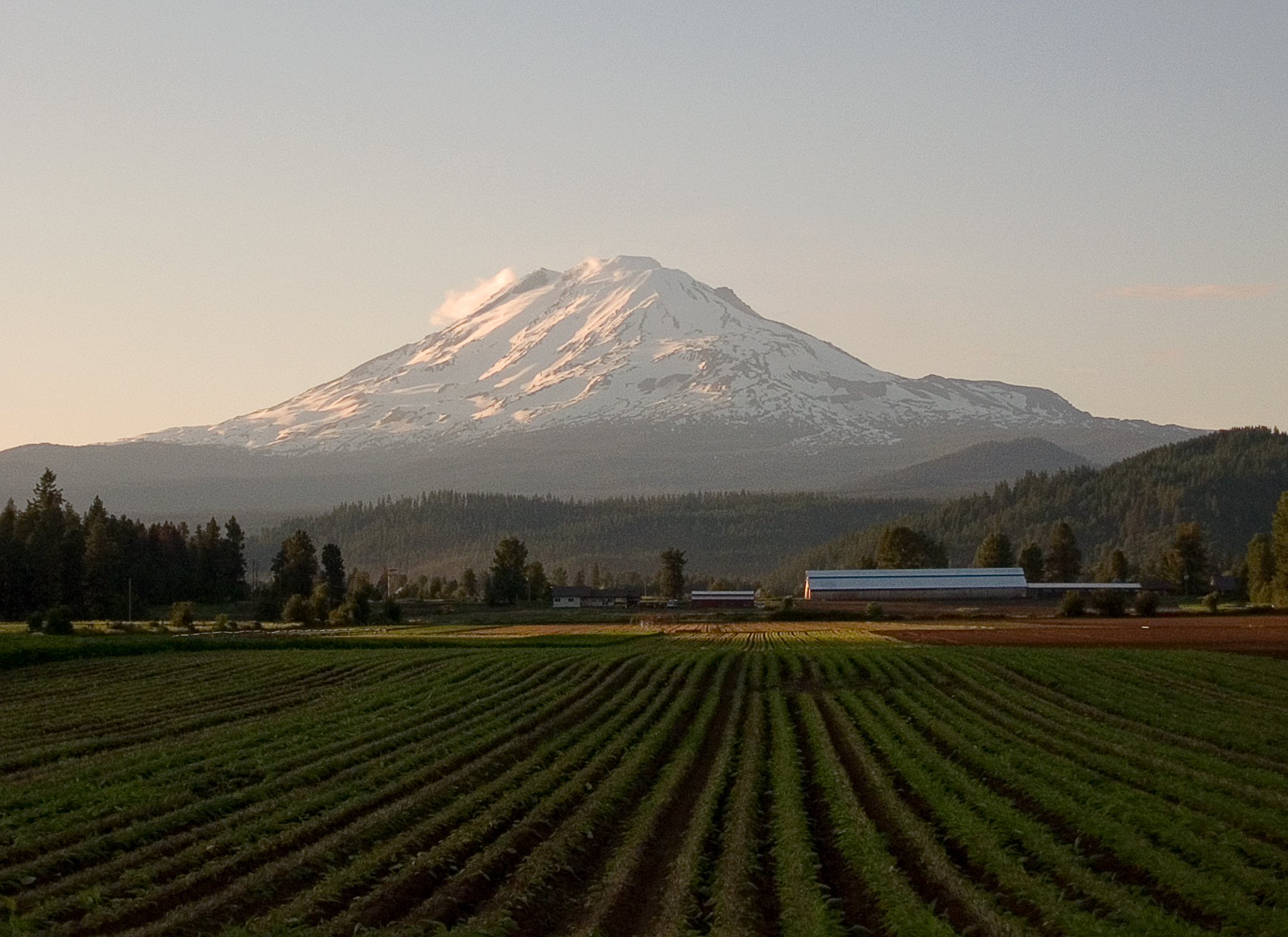
Mount Adams from Trout Lake Highway

Trout Lake is in the northwest corner of Klickitat County, 14 miles (23 km) south of the 12,276-foot (3,742 m) summit of Mount Adams. State Route 141 passes through the community, traveling 22 miles (35 km) south to the town of White Salmon and 5 miles (8 km) west to its terminus at Gifford Pinchot National Forest.

According to the United States Census Bureau, the Trout Lake CDP has a total area of 7.0 square miles (18.1 km^{2}), of which 0.04 square miles (0.1 km^{2}), or 0.61%, are water. The community sits in the Trout Lake Valley, drained to the southeast by Trout Lake Creek which flows to the White Salmon River, a south-flowing tributary of the Columbia River.

=== Climate ===
Climate data for Mount Adams Ranger Station, Washington, 1991–2020 normals: 1950ft (594m)
Month	Jan	Feb	Mar	Apr	May	Jun	Jul	Aug	Sep	Oct	Nov	Dec	Year
Mean daily maximum °F (°C)	38.6 (3.7)	43.2 (6.2)	49.3 (9.6)	58.0 (14.4)	67.6 (19.8)	73.9 (23.3)	83.9 (28.8)	83.7 (28.7)	75.2 (24.0)	59.8 (15.4)	45.2 (7.3)	36.8 (2.7)	59.6 (15.3)
Daily mean °F (°C)	32.2 (0.1)	34.8 (1.6)	39.3 (4.1)	45.6 (7.6)	53.7 (12.1)	59.4 (15.2)	66.9 (19.4)	66.4 (19.1)	58.8 (14.9)	47.5 (8.6)	37.5 (3.1)	31.1 (−0.5)	47.8 (8.8)
Mean daily minimum °F (°C)	25.8 (−3.4)	26.5 (−3.1)	29.3 (−1.5)	33.2 (0.7)	39.9 (4.4)	44.9 (7.2)	49.8 (9.9)	49.1 (9.5)	42.4 (5.8)	35.1 (1.7)	29.8 (−1.2)	25.3 (−3.7)	35.9 (2.2)
Average precipitation inches (mm)	7.63 (194)	5.14 (131)	5.50 (140)	2.44 (62)	1.65 (42)	1.27 (32)	0.45 (11)	0.65 (17)	1.11 (28)	3.91 (99)	7.78 (198)	8.63 (219)	46.16 (1,173)
Average snowfall inches (cm)	34.0 (86)	15.4 (39)	8.4 (21)	1.3 (3.3)	0 (0)	0 (0)	0 (0)	0 (0)	0 (0)	0.1 (0.25)	7.2 (18)	28.0 (71)	94.4 (240)
Source 1: NOAA
Source 2: WRCC (precipitation & snowfall)

== Demographics ==
Historical population
Census	Pop.	Note	%±
2000	494		—
2010	557		12.8%
2020	672		20.6%
U.S. Decennial Census; 1990 2000 2010 2020

Trout Lake first appeared as a census designated place in the 2000 U.S. census.

=== Racial and ethnic composition ===
Trout Lake CDP, Washington – Racial and ethnic composition Note: the US Census treats Hispanic/Latino as an ethnic category. This table excludes Latinos from the racial categories and assigns them to a separate category. Hispanics/Latinos may be of any race.
Race / Ethnicity (NH = Non-Hispanic)	Pop 2000	Pop 2010	Pop 2020	% 2000	% 2010	% 2020
White alone (NH)	459	506	553	92.91%	90.84%	82.29%
Black or African American alone (NH)	0	1	2	0.00%	0.18%	0.30%
Native American or Alaska Native alone (NH)	5	5	12	1.01%	0.90%	1.79%
Asian alone (NH)	4	4	5	0.81%	0.72%	0.74%
Native Hawaiian or Pacific Islander alone (NH)	1	0	0	0.20%	0.00%	0.00%
Other race alone (NH)	2	0	1	0.40%	0.00%	0.15%
Mixed race or Multiracial (NH)	7	12	49	1.42%	2.15%	7.29%
Hispanic or Latino (any race)	16	29	50	3.24%	5.21%	7.44%
Total	494	557	672	100.00%	100.00%	100.00%

=== 2010 census ===
As of the 2010 United States census, there were 557 people, 224 households, and 171 families residing in the CDP. The population density was 78.5 people per square mile. There were 290 housing units at an average density of 40.8/sq mi. The racial makeup of the CDP was 92.6% White, 0.2% Black, 0.9% Native American, 0.7% Asian, 2.5% from other races, and 3.1% from two or more races. Hispanic or Latino of any race were 5.2% of the population.

There were 224 households, out of which 28.1% included children under the age of 18, 64.7% included a married husband and wife, 4.0% included a male householder with no wife present, 7.6% had a female householder with no husband present, and 23.7% were non-families. The average household size was 2.46 and the average family size was 2.81.

The demographic spread included 130 (23.3%) under the age of 18, 329 (59.1%) aged 20 to 64, and 85 (15.3%) who were 65 years of age or older. By gender, the population was 51.7% (288) male and 48.3% (269) female. The median age was 44.8 years.

In 2011, the American Community Survey estimated a median income of $31,563 (adjusted for inflation, 2011 dollars) for an individual, and $56,250 for a household.
