= Goose Lake (Washington) =

Lake in Skamania County, Washington, United States

- Location within Washington (state) Location within the United States
- Location: Skamania County, Washington, United States
- Coordinates: 45°56′28″N 121°45′54″W
- Lake type: natural
- Primary inflows: unnamed inflow creeks
- Primary outflows: unnamed outflow creek; evaporation and seepage
- Basin countries: United States
- Max. length: 3,028 ft (923 m)
- Max. width: 1,441 ft (439 m)
- Surface area: 58 acres (23 ha)
- Surface elevation: 3,110 ft (950 m)
- Islands: 0
- Settlements: (none)

Goose Lake, in the U.S. state of Washington, is located within the Gifford Pinchot National Forest. Goose Lake is situated on a dirt road, along Forest Road 60, also called the Carson Guler Road, ideal because it is typically free of snow by late June. It is fed by several streams, Goose Lake was dammed by a lava flow from Big Lava Bed, which erupted about 8200 years ago, directly to the south of the lake. The lake is 58 acres in size and includes a boat launch and a campground with 18 primitive campsites. Popular for fishing in summer and early fall, Goose Lake contains brook, brown, and coastal cutthroat trout.

== History ==
Goose Lake formed when the Big Lava Bed dammed up a nearby stream. The blocked stream formed the lake. On the southeast side of the lake, there is a ghostly stand of dead trees rising from the water.

== Recreation ==
The lake is a popular spot for brook, brown and coastal cutthroat trout fishing. Goose Lake Campground offers a concrete boat ramp for launching small boats, kayaks and canoes. The campground also offers activities such as camping, hiking, and berry picking. Nearby places include the Big Lava Bed, south of the campground; a trail takes hikers through a landscape dotted with pine forest and basalt lava formations. The Indian Heaven Wilderness is located nearby and is known for its abundant huckleberries, meadowlands and pine forests, lakes, and a variety of wildlife. Huckleberry picking is a popular pastime too.

== Accessibility ==
The lake is reached via 8 miles of narrow gravel road from the east of Trout Lake on State Route 141 north from SR 14, to the town of Trout Lake. Continue through the town on State Route 141 to where it ends and Forest Route 24 begins. Drive on Forest Route 24 to the junction with Forest Route 60 and follow Forest Route 60 for 1 mile to Goose Lake.

From the West, Carson, take the Wind River Highway, north to the Old State Highway. Heading towards Panther Creek Campground, continue past the campground on Forest Route 65 to the 4 corners, junction of Forest Route 65 and 60. From here, turn right on Forest Route 60, and continue on to Goose Lake.

== See also ==
- Lakes of Washington
- Skamania County, Washington
- Gifford Pinchot National Forest
