= Trapper Creek Wilderness =

Wilderness area in Washington, United States

- IUCN category Ib (wilderness area)
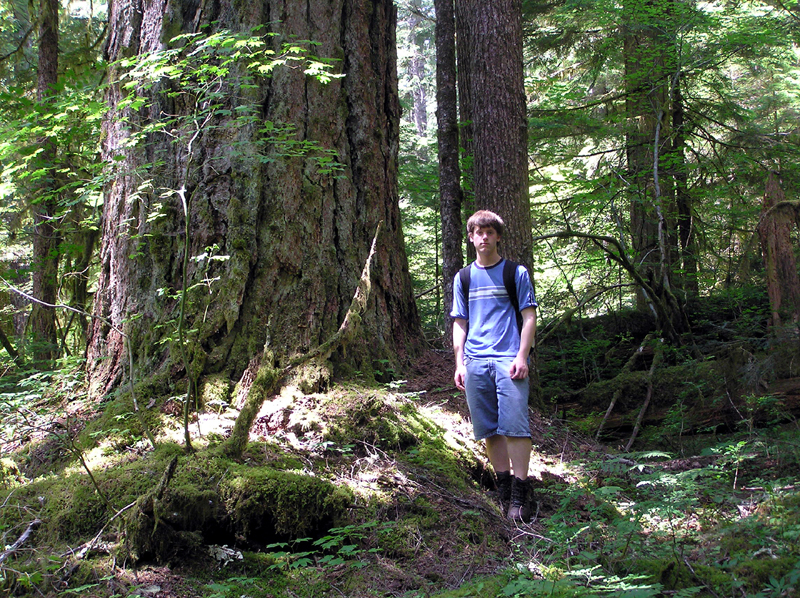
- Old growth with hiker in Trapper Creek Wilderness

- Location within the United States
- Location: Skamania County, Washington, United States
- Nearest city: Stabler, Washington
- Coordinates: 45°54′14″N 122°01′40″W
- Area: 5,969 acres (2,416 ha)
- Established: 1984
- Governing body: U.S. Forest Service
- Website: Trapper Creek Wilderness

The Trapper Creek Wilderness is a designated wilderness consisting of 5,969 acres (2,416 ha) in the Gifford Pinchot National Forest in southern Washington. The wilderness covers nearly the entire Trapper Creek drainage and is the only pristine anadromous fish habitat in the Wind River watershed. The terrain is very steep and rugged and holds many streams and waterfalls—one as tall as 100 ft (30 m). It is one of the few sizeable blocks of low-elevation old-growth forest remaining in southern Washington.

== Wildlife ==
Animals inhabiting the wilderness include Roosevelt elk, which can often be found near dry creek in the winter and spring while remaining higher up, close to the ridge trail, just below Observation Peak during summer and fall. Spotted owls inhabit the wilderness as well as barred owls, pileated woodpeckers, and goshawks. Other animals commonly seen in the area include black-tail deer and black bear. Cougar, bobcat, and pine marten can be seen occasionally.

== Hiking ==
There are many relatively popular and well maintained hiking trails in the wilderness area. Trails #132, #132A, #133, and a short portion of #192 were constructed by the Forest Service and are maintained annually. All other trails in the area were constructed and are maintained by the Mazamas, a mountaineering organization based out of Portland, Oregon. The Mazamas trails are classified as primitive, are steep and sometimes difficult to follow. The top of Observation Peak offers panoramic views of Mount Hood, Mount Adams, Mount Rainier, Mount Jefferson and the Goat Rocks.

== See also ==
- List of U.S. Wilderness Areas
- List of old-growth forests
