= Langfield Falls =

Waterfall in Washington, USA

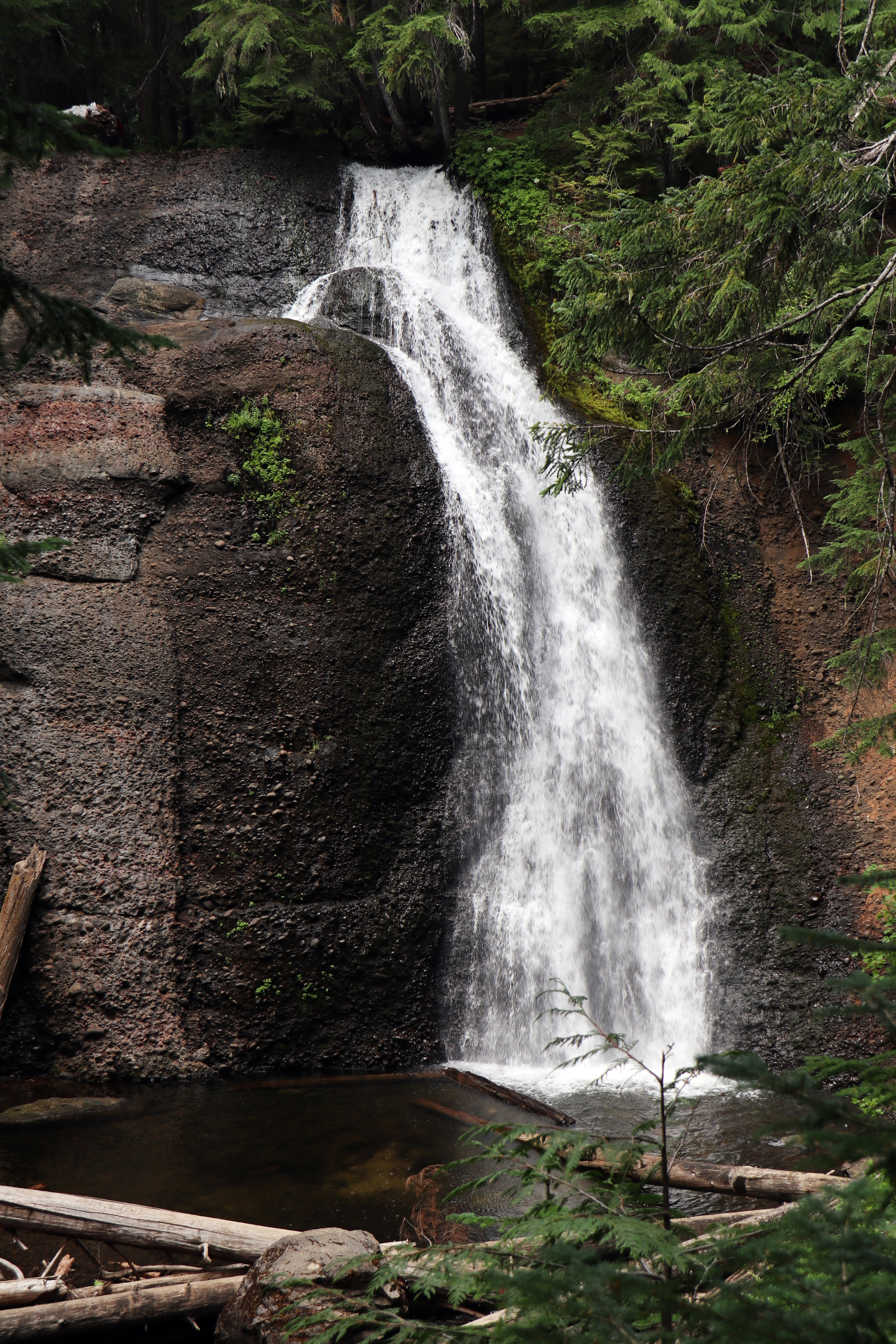
- Interactive map of Langfield Falls
- Coordinates: 46.0964667°N 121.7152108°W
- Total height: 57 feet (17 m)
- Watercourse: Trout Lake Creek

Langfield Falls is a waterfall in the United States, located in Skamania County, Washington, in the Gifford Pinchot National Forest. Langfield Falls was named after Karl C. Langfield, a United States Forest Service ranger.

== See also ==
- List of waterfalls
