= Carson National Fish Hatchery =

Fish hatchery in Washington, United States

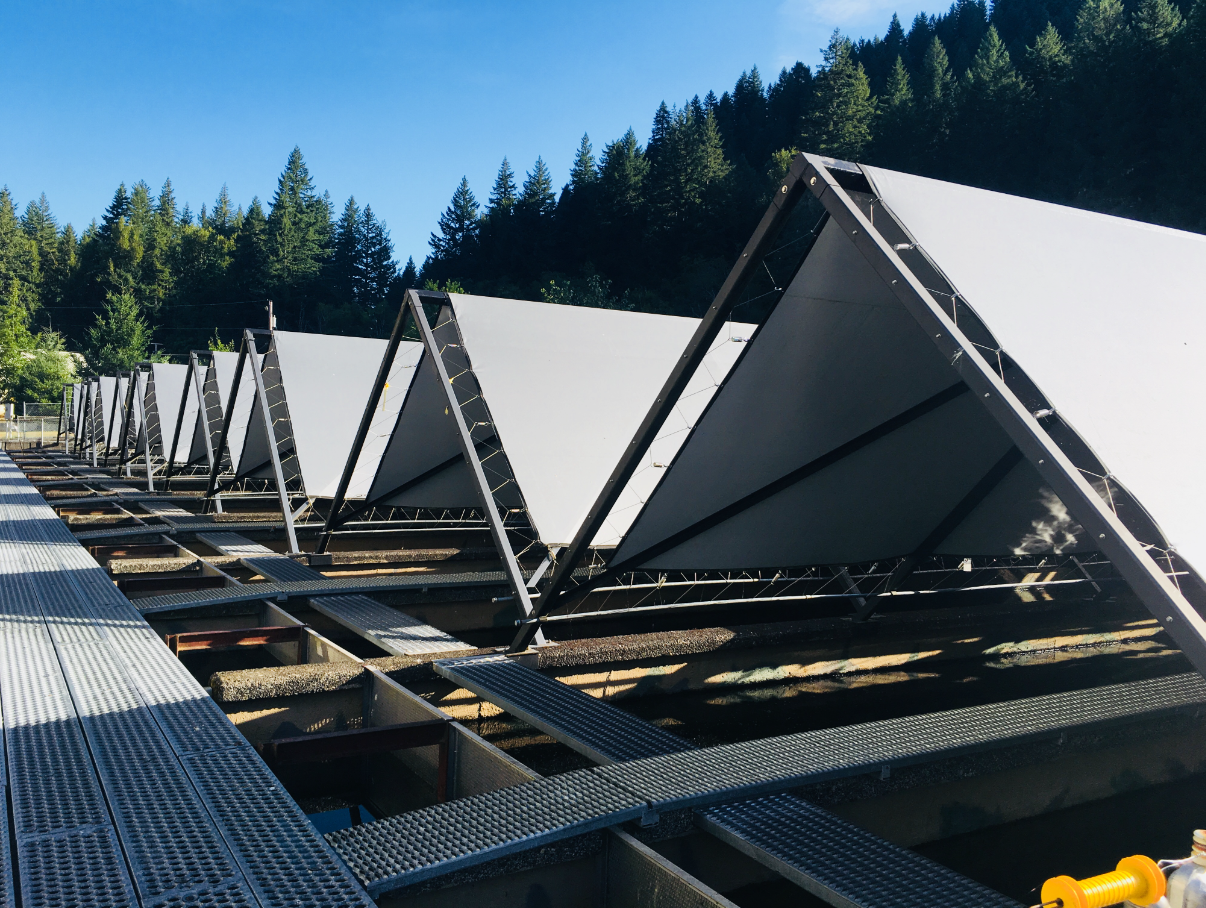
- Covered raceways at the hatchery.

- Location within Washington (state) Location within the United States
- Location: Skamania County, Washington, United States
- Coordinates: 45.86802251329663°N 121.97394535857686°W
- Area: 20 acres (8.1 ha)
- Established: 1937 or 1938 (see text); Constructed 1937 or 1938 (see text)
- Named for: Carson, Washington
- Governing body: United States Fish and Wildlife Service
- Website: www.fws.gov/fish-hatchery/carson

The Carson National Fish Hatchery is a fish hatchery located 13 miles (21 km) northwest of Carson in Skamania County, Washington, in the United States. It is about 60 miles (97 km) east of Portland, Oregon. It is managed and operated by the United States Fish and Wildlife Service. Like other components of the National Fish Hatchery System, the hatchery's mission is to conserve, protect, and enhance fish, wildlife, plants, and their habitats, as well to cooperate with like-minded partners to further these goals. Specifically, the hatchery produces spring Chinook salmon (Oncorhynchus tshawytscha) for stocking in the Wind River, a tributary of the Columbia River, as well as Chinook salmon eggs for hatching at other fish hatcheries.

== Management ==
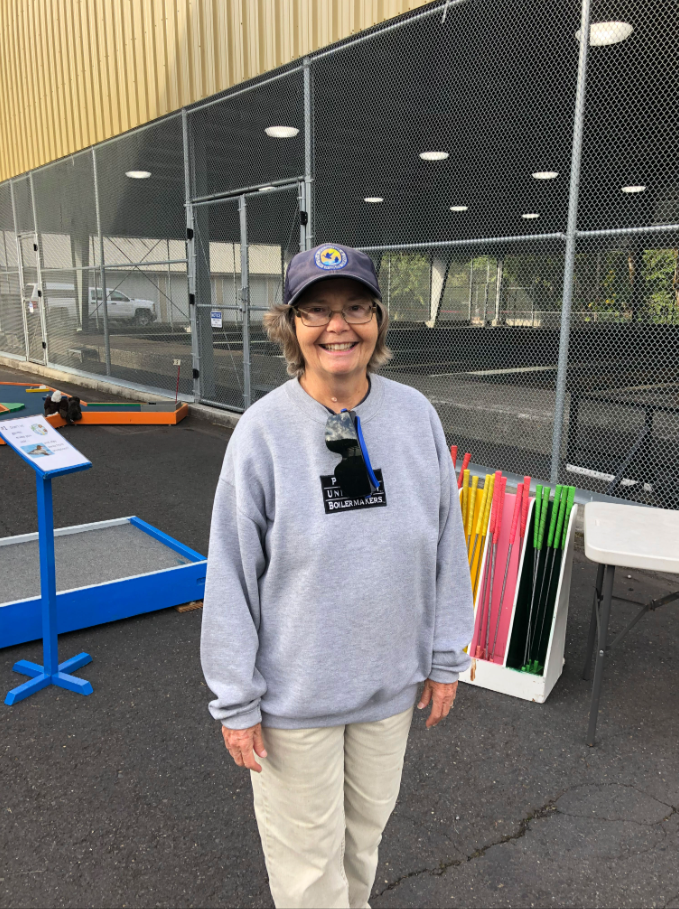
A Hatchery Host program participant on duty at the hatchery on November 9, 2021.

The Carson National Fish Hatchery receives its primary funding through the Mitchell Act, passed by the United States Congress in 1938 to advance the conservation of salmon and steelhead fishery resources in the Columbia River Basin by supporting the establishment, operation, and maintenance of hatchery facilities in Idaho, Oregon, and Washington, as well as the monitoring and evaluating of hatchery programs, the screening of irrigation intakes, and improvements in fish passage. The National Oceanic and Atmospheric Administration's National Marine Fisheries Service administers funding authorized annually under the act. The Carson National Fish Hatchery's funding specifically is allocated to the spring Chinook salmon-rearing program. The hatchery also receives some additional funding to produce salmon as prey for southern resident orcas (Orcinus orca, also known as killer whales) in accordance with the Pacific Salmon Treaty.

The Carson National Fish Hatchery is managed and operated by the United States Fish and Wildlife Service. In addition to its staff of U.S. Fish and Wildlife Service employees, it makes use of volunteers, offering them both daily and long-term volunteering opportunities. Daily volunteers assist the hatchery's staff with special events, fish production, and light maintenance activities. The hatchery also offers the Hatchery Host program, in which volunteers agree to spend three to four months on station providing 20 hours per week of assistance in groundskeeping, fish production, light maintenance, and greeting people at visitor contact stations in exchange for the free use of an RV pad. The hatchery has two RV pads for Hatchery Host program participants, each of which provides electrical, water, sewer, and telephone hook-ups and access to an on-site laundry.

The hatchery is a component of the U.S. Fish and Wildlife Service's Columbia River Gorge National Fish Hatchery Complex, a complex of hatcheries along the Columbia River Gorge that partners with Native American tribes to hatch and release over 22.5 million or over 25 million (according to different sources) salmon per year to mitigate fishery losses, restore fish populations, and provide tribes with an important cultural resource. The other hatcheries in this complex are the Eagle Creek, Little White Salmon, Spring Creek, Warm Springs, and Willard National Fish Hatcheries.

== Facilities ==
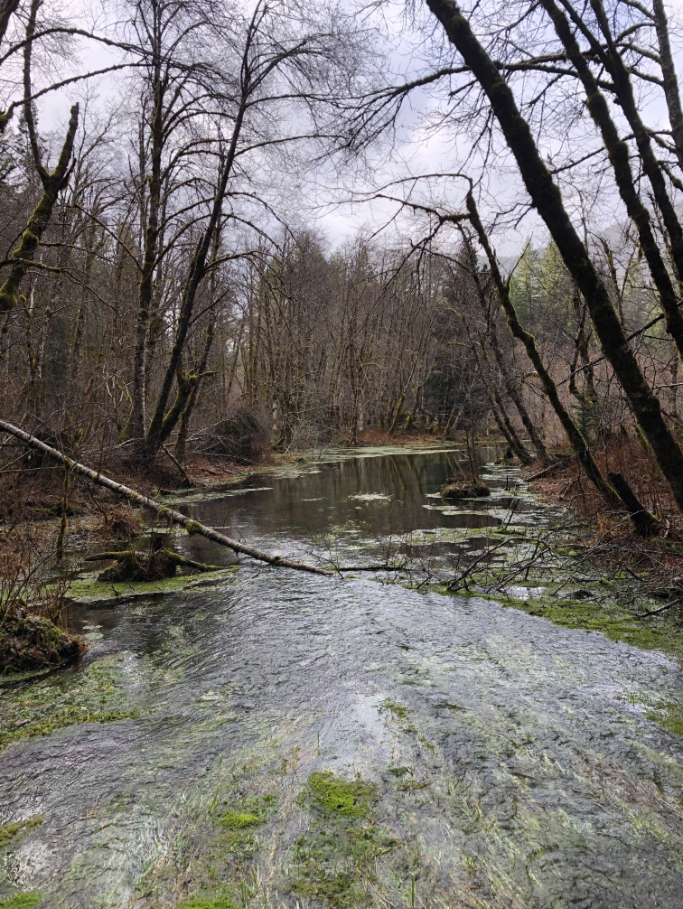
Tyee Springs — the hatchery's water source — on October 21, 2021.

The Carson National Fish Hatchery lies on 20 acres (8.1 hectares) (Note: Rowlen (October 3, 2022) claims the hatchery's grounds have an area of 220 acres (89 hectares).) of developed river bottom at river mile 18 on the Wind River — a tributary of the Columbia River — at the Wind River's confluence with Tyee Creek. The Wind River enters the Columbia River 10 miles (16 km) upriver from Bonneville Dam and 155 miles (249 km) upriver from the Pacific Ocean. The hatchery's water source is Tyee Springs, which lies on the hatchery grounds.

== Activities ==
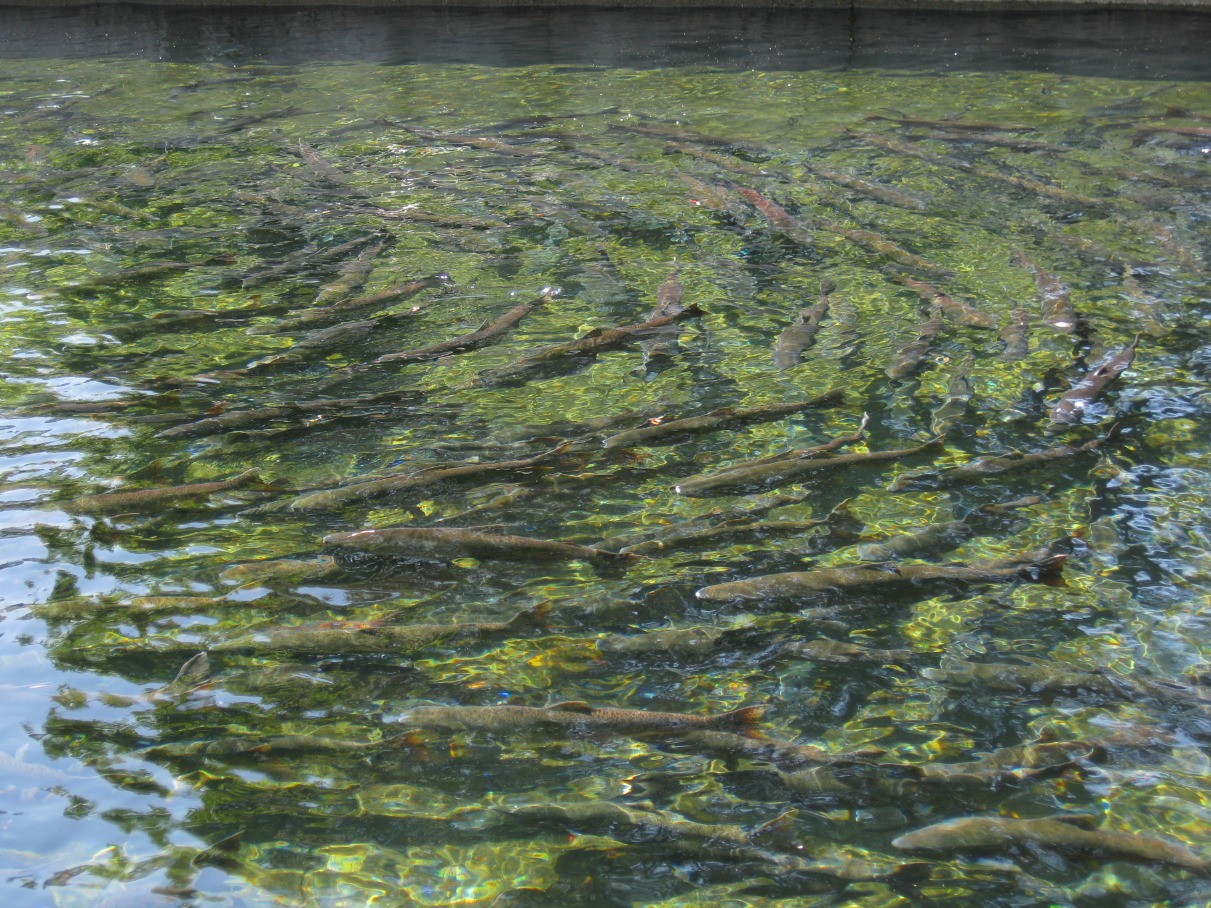
Adult spring Chinook salmon (Oncorhynchus tshawytscha) at the hatchery on November 9, 2021.

The Carson National Fish Hatchery raises and releases spring Chinook salmon (Oncorhynchus tshawytscha) — i.e., Chinook salmon which enter rivers in late winter and spring to spawn (in contrast to fall Chinook salmon, which make their spawning runs in late summer and fall) — to mitigate fishery losses resulting from the construction of hydroelectric dams on the Columbia River. The hatchery specifically focuses on the conservation of Columbia River spring Chinook salmon upriver from Bonneville Dam. As of 2025, its annual production goal is 1.52 million spring Chinook salmon, which it releases directly into the Wind River. After between one and five years in the Pacific Ocean, adult spring Chinook salmon hatched and raised at the hatchery return to the hatchery in the spring of each year. The hatchery then keeps them in its adult fish holding ponds until spawning them each August.

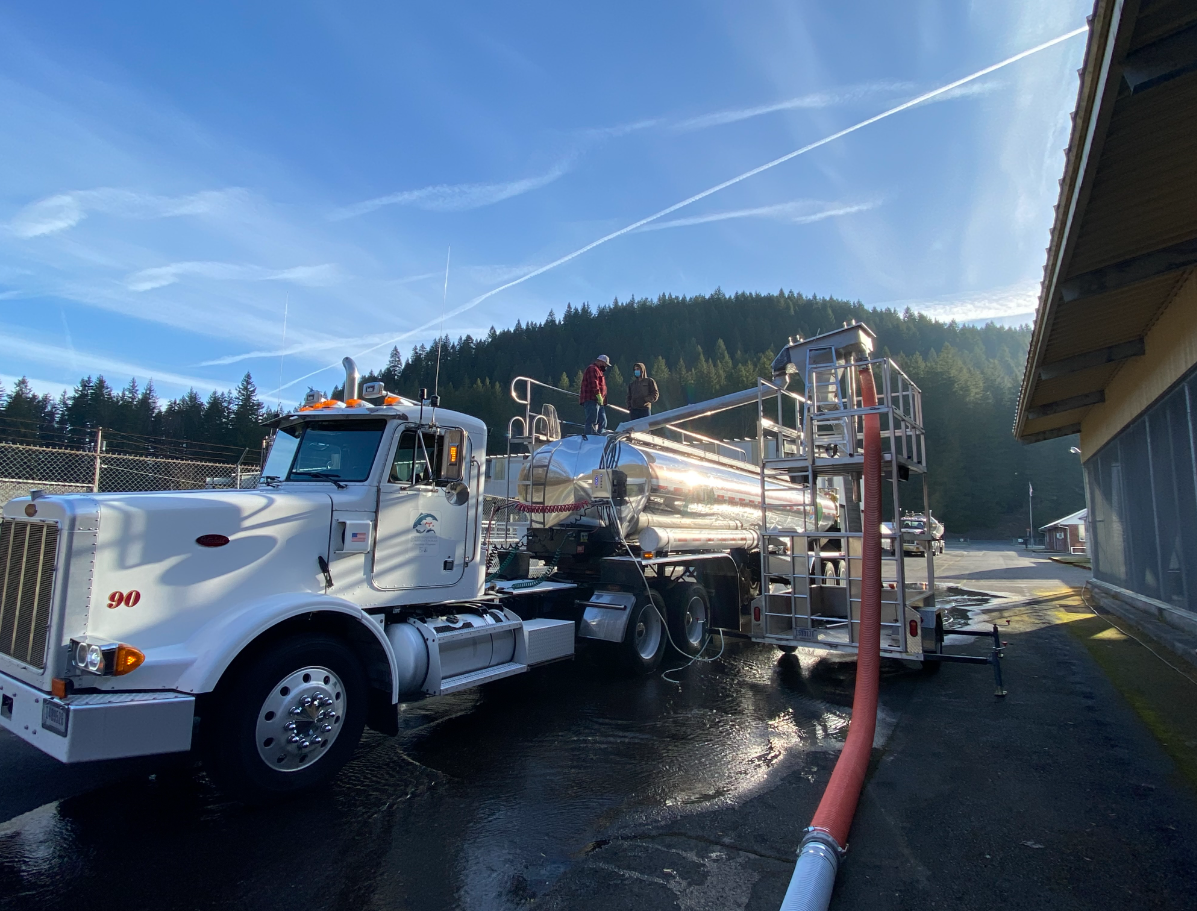
A hatchery distribution truck transfers fish to the Umatilla Indian Reservation on October 20, 2021.

In addition to raising and releasing fish, the hatchery provides 250,000 spring Chinook salmon eggs each year to the Washington Department of Fish and Wildlife's Lyons Ferry Fish Hatchery for stocking in the Touchet River, a tributary of the Walla Walla River in eastern Washington. The Carson National Fish Hatchery transfers the eggs to the Lyons Ferry Fish Hatchery after they become "eyed," i.e., after the fish within the eggs develop visible eyes. The hatchery also provides up to 400,000 spring Chinook salmon eggs to the Walla Walla Fish Hatchery Production Program of the Confederated Tribes of the Umatilla Indian Reservation for the reintroduction of the species into the Walla Walla River.

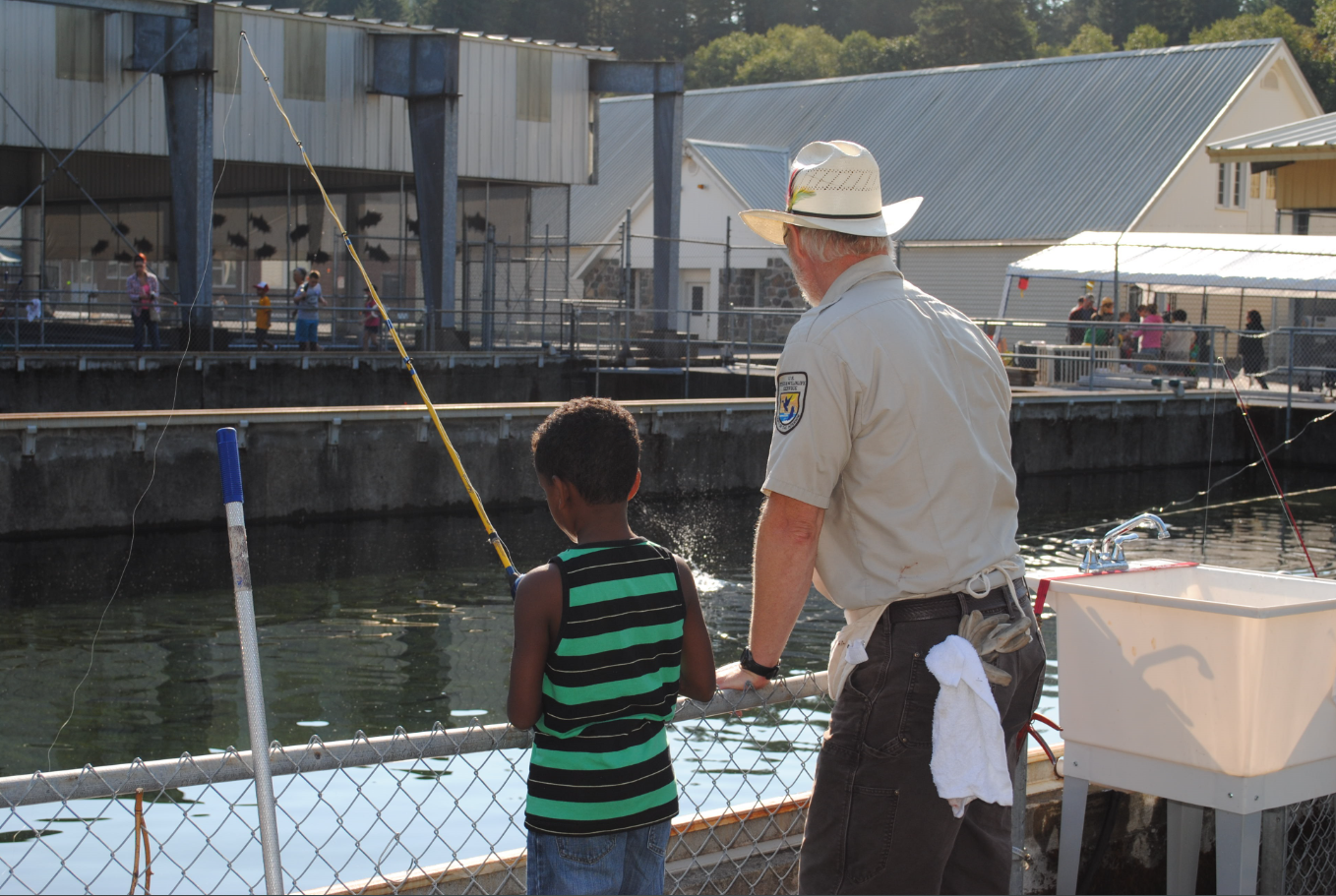
A staff member helps a boy fish during an outreach event at the hatchery.

The hatchery is active in the Columbia River Gorge National Fish Hatchery Complex's Outreach and Education Program, as part of which the complex's Education Office offers a very popular "Salmon in the Classroom" program to schools in the Columbia River Gorge and beyond. Under the program, students visit one of the complex's hatcheries to see the spawning process and learn about the importance of fish hatcheries. The hatchery then delivers eggs to a classroom it equips with a fish tank, a chiller, and display materials, and students subsequently make daily observations of the development of the eggs and the fish that hatch from them. Staff from the hatchery's Information and Education Office also visit the classrooms to provide lessons on salmon anatomy, watershed health, and adaptations.

The hatchery conducts tours for school groups to educate students about the role fish hatcheries play in restoring and maintaining fish populations. In addition, the hatchery's outreach staff offer a variety of outdoor learning opportunities each spring and summer that include field days, archery, stream surveys, summer camps, and special events.

== History ==
Sources disagree regarding details of the origins of the Carson National Fish Hatchery; one claims that the United States Government established it in 1937 and that it began producing fish that year, while others assert that it was authorized in 1938 under the Mitchell Act — which the United States Congress passed that year to mitigate the negative effects of the construction of the Bonneville Dam on commercial, sport, and Native American tribal fisheries — and that the Civilian Conservation Corps constructed the hatchery in 1938. In any case, the hatchery — originally known as the Tyee Substation of the United States Bureau of Fisheries — initially raised fall Chinook salmon as well as other species of salmon and trout. In 1940, the U.S. Bureau of Fisheries merged with other agencies to form the United States Department of the Interior's Fish and Wildlife Service. From around 1940 until the early 1960s, the hatchery raised and released brook trout (Salvelinus fontinalis), native to the eastern United States, in waters in the Pacific Northwest to support recreational fishing; it later became apparent that stocking waters with non-native fish damaged ecosystems, and the hatchery ceased the practice.

Soon after the hatchery began operations, populations of spring Chinook salmon in the lower Columbia River plummeted due to losses of spawning habitats, the construction of dams that blocked the salmon from reaching their spawning areas, and other environmental degradation due to construction and development along the river and its tributaries. In response, the hatchery began raising spring Chinook salmon in the 1950s and was remodeled in 1956 — the same year the Fish and Wildlife Service underwent a major reorganization to become the United States Fish and Wildlife Service — to optimize the hatchery for collecting and incubating spring Chinook salmon eggs, rearing juvenile salmon, and releasing them into the Wind River. The first adult spring Chinook salmon returned to the hatchery to spawn in 1960. In 1981, the hatchery discontinued all other fish production to focus exclusively on hatching, raising, and releasing spring Chinook salmon.

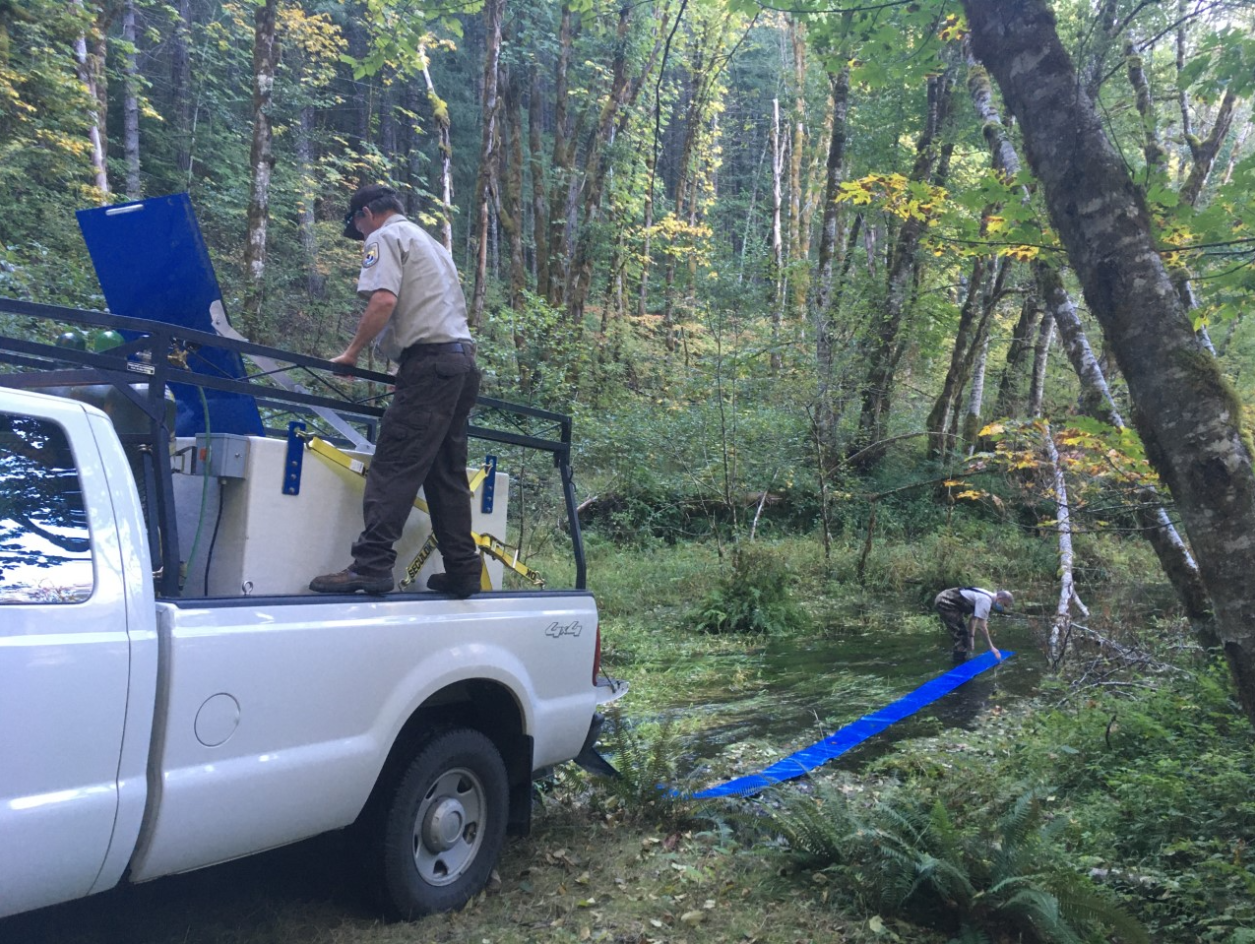
Stocking Tyee Springs with YY male brook trout (Salvelinus fontinalis) on September 22, 2022.

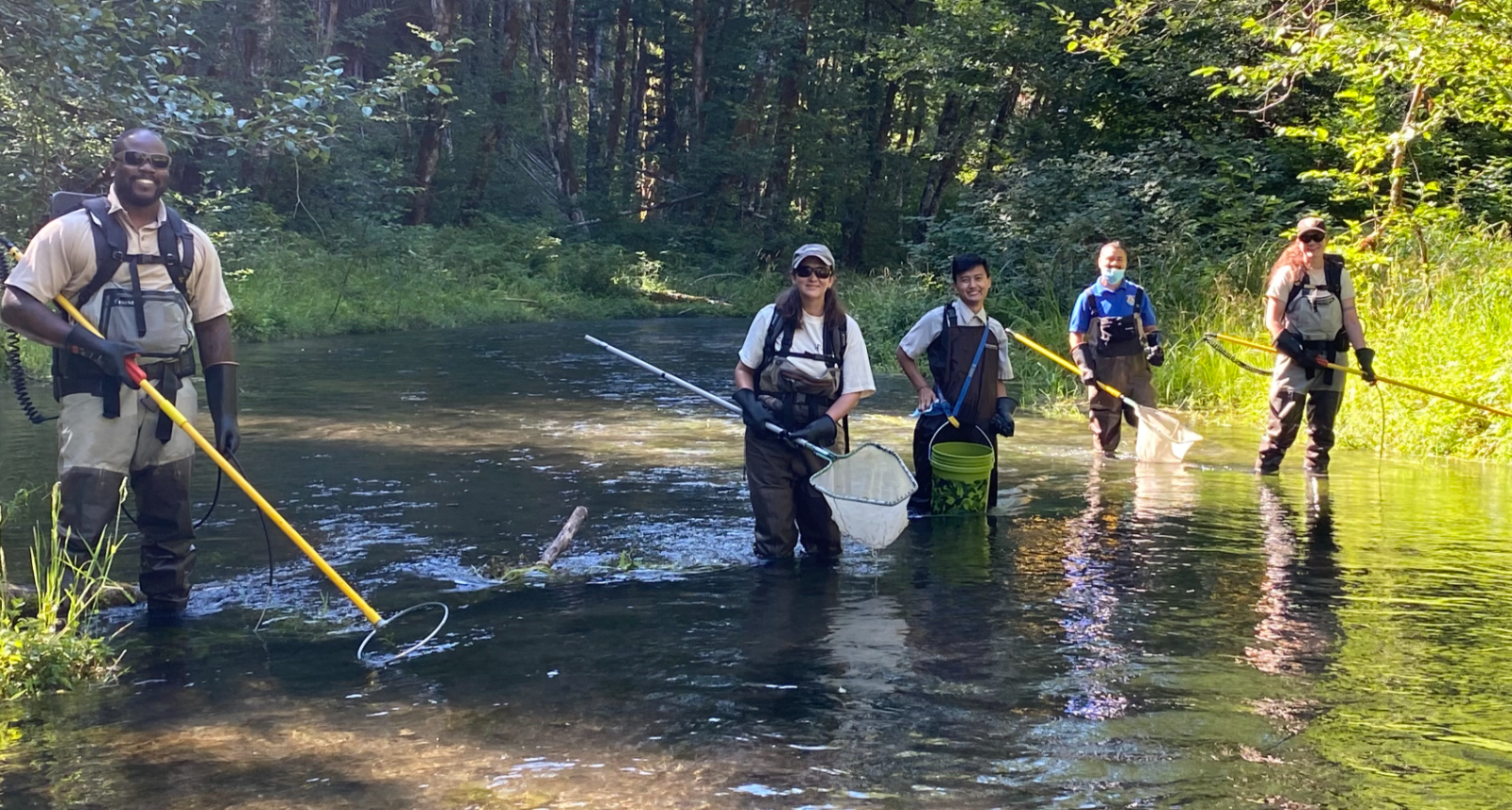
U.S. Fish and Wildlife employees electrofishing for invasive brook trout (Salvelinus fontinalis) in Tyee Springs during the summer of 2022.

Thanks to the introduction of brook trout into waters in the Pacific Northwest in the 19th and 20th centuries, a thriving population of the species developed in Tyee Springs, which is directly upstream from the hatchery and is its source of water. Like many non-native species, brook trout lack predators and tend to outcompete native species in the areas in which they are introduced, with destructive effects on ecosystems. Moreover, brook trout are a potential source of bacterial kidney disease and whirling disease, either of which can devastate salmon populations, making their presence in Tyee Springs a threat to salmon at the hatchery itself and in the waters in which the hatchery releases fish; because of such concerns, 21st-century hatchery management practices require a "fishless" water source. Concerned about the existence of brook trout in Tyee Springs and having had no success in previous efforts to eradicate them, the Carson National Fish Hatchery partnered with the U.S. Fish and Wildlife Service's Columbia River Fish and Wildlife Conservation Office and Abernathy Fish Technology Center in 2020 to begin a long-term eradication program. One part of the program involves capturing and removing brook trout in Tyee Springs: During the first two years of the program, the hatchery removed 1,145 brook trout (an estimated 15 percent of the population) in 2020 and 2,314 (an estimated 46 percent of the population) in 2021. The other part involves introducing male brook trout bred to have YY chromosomes rather than the normal XY chromosomes; when YY males breed with the resident females, all the offspring produced are males, leading eventually to an all-male population which cannot breed and therefore dies out entirely. The Fish and Wildlife Service introduced 600 one-year-old YY males (all tagged and marked with clipped fins for future identification) into Tyee Springs in 2020 and 1,923 YY males less than a year old (999 of them tagged and clipped) in 2021. Monitoring of the fish between 2020 and 2022 suggested poor over-winter survival rates for YY males. A 2019 population model projected that the program would result in the eradication of females from the population in 2033 and the subsequent complete collapse of the population, but monitoring of the fish continues and may result in changes to the model as the Fish and Wildlife Service judges the effectiveness of the eradication program.

== Recreation ==
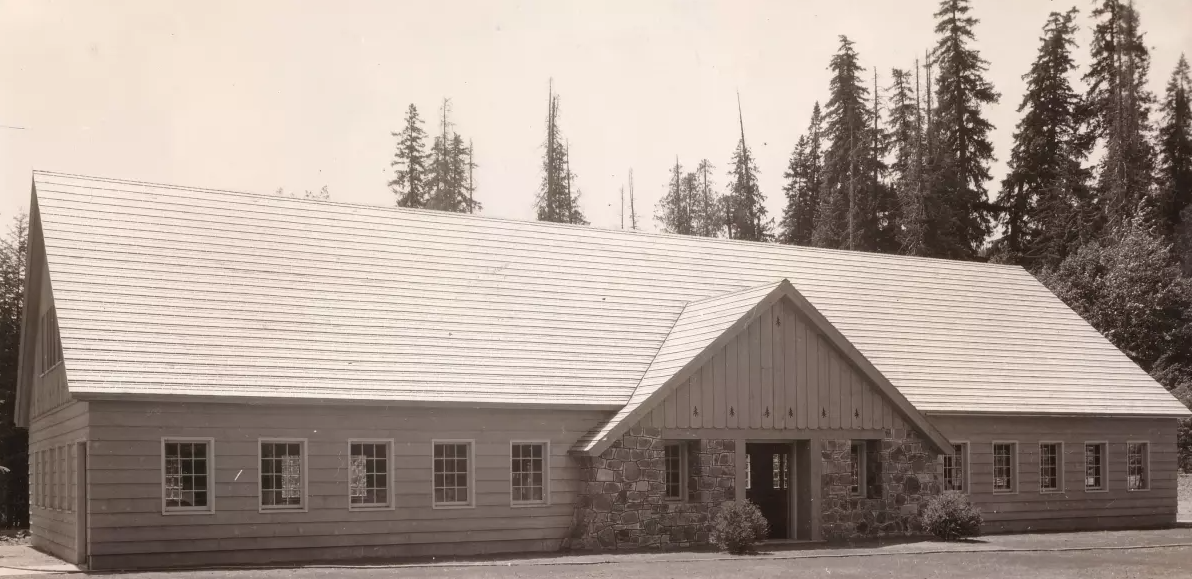
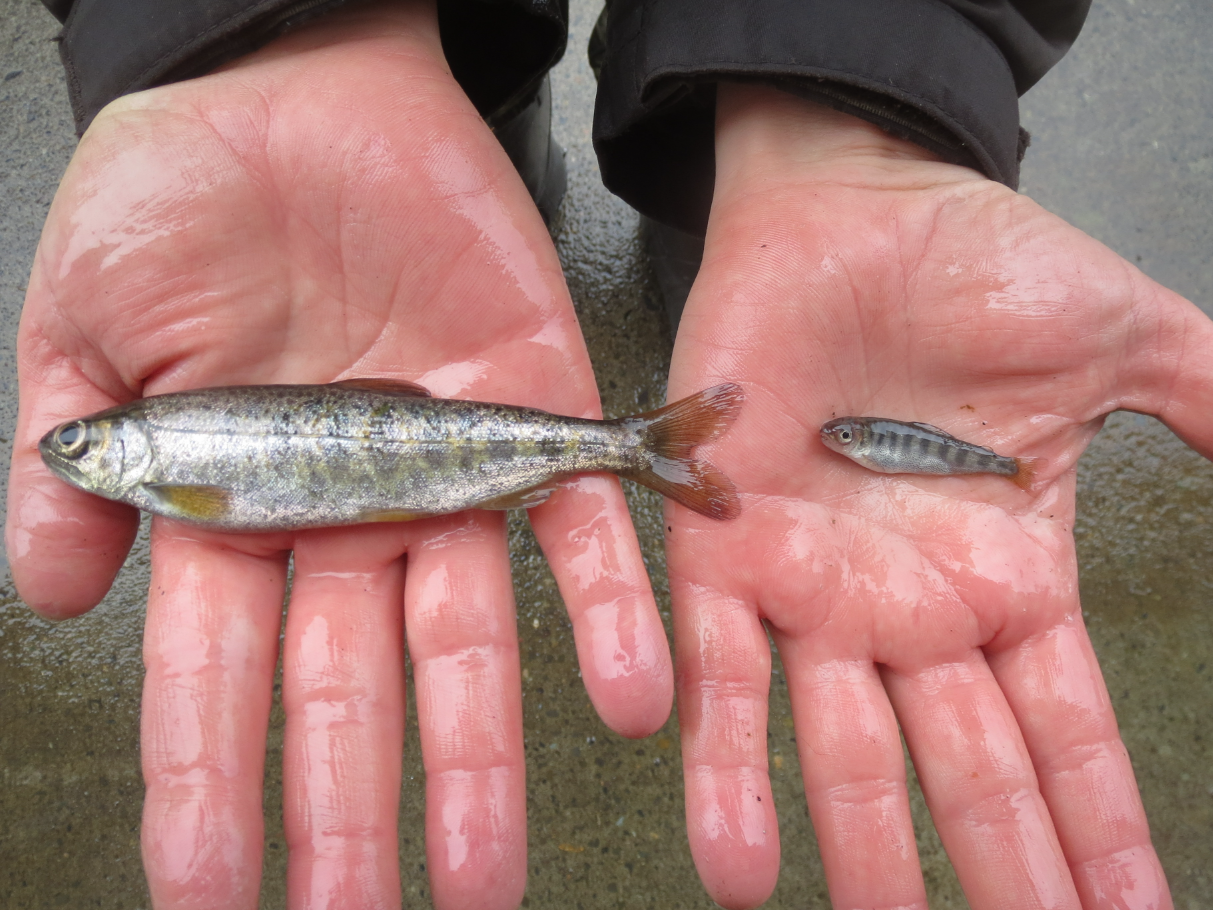
LEFT: The hatchery's nursery building. RIGHT: Two age classes of juvenile spring Chinook salmon at the hatchery on December 1, 2021.
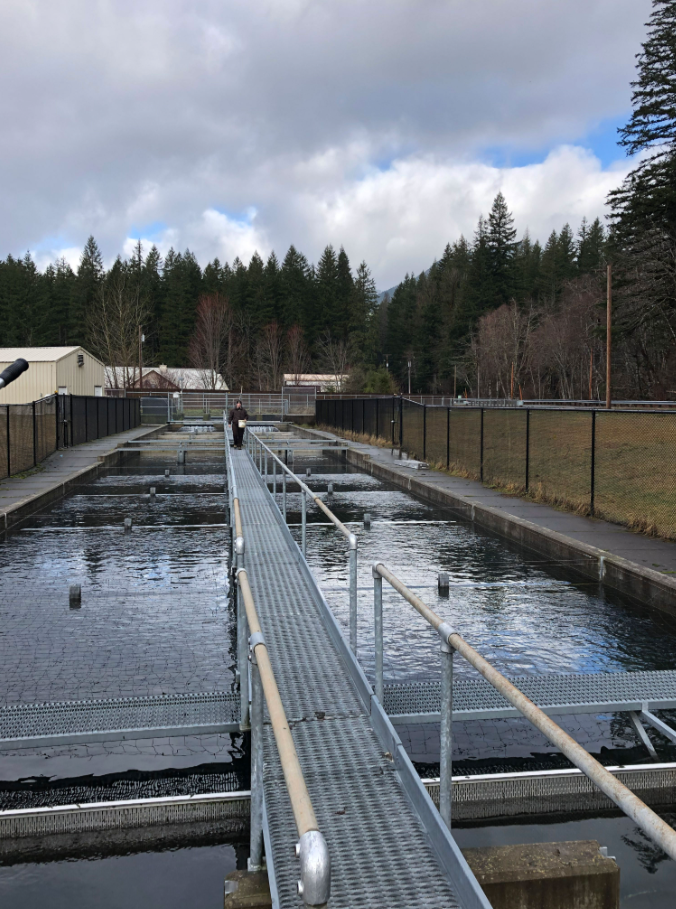
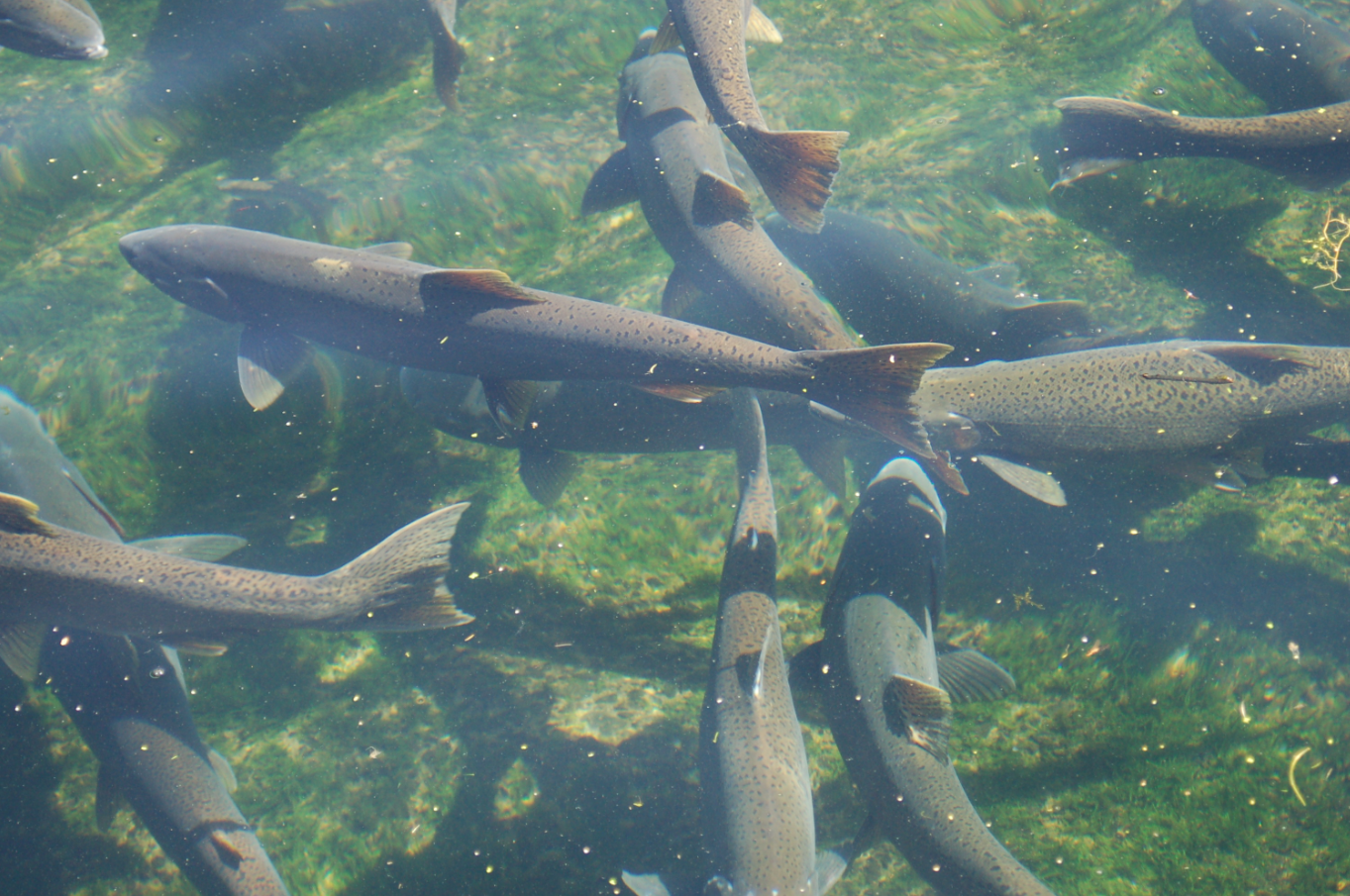
LEFT: Raceways at the hatchery on October 21, 2021. RIGHT: Adult spring Chinook salmon at the hatchery.

The Carson National Fish Hatchery lies in a scenic location in a heavily forested valley within the Gifford Pinchot National Forest. Hatchery visitors thus have an opportunity to view the national forest's scenery on their way to and from the hatchery.

The hatchery is open to visitors on weekdays. Its fish ladder opens in early May each year, affording visitors an opportunity to view returning spring Chinook salmon until August. Visitors also can see adult spring Chinook salmon in the hatchery's holding ponds from April or May (according to different sources) to August each year and eggs, sac-fry, and fry in the nursery building from October to December; visitor access to the nursery building is permitted only during specific visiting hours and only when accompanied by a hatchery employee. Juvenile fish are available for viewing in the hatchery's raceways all year, and visitors may view them without a hatchery escort and at any time.

The hatchery grounds include two public picnic areas equipped with tables, grills, and a water supply. Both areas offer views of the Gifford Pinchot National Forest.

The hatchery grounds themselves and the surrounding national forest provide wildlife viewing, birdwatching, and wildlife photography opportunities. A resident elk (Cervus canadensis) herd lives in the national forest near the hatchery grounds, and deer (family Cervidae), small mammals, and wild turkeys (Meleagris gallopavo) and a variety of other birds often are seen in the vicinity.

The hatchery grounds have no hiking trails. However, the surrounding national forest has a variety of public trails.

== See also ==
- National Fish Hatchery System
- List of National Fish Hatcheries in the United States
