= Gifford Pinchot National Forest =

Protected area in the state of Washington, United States

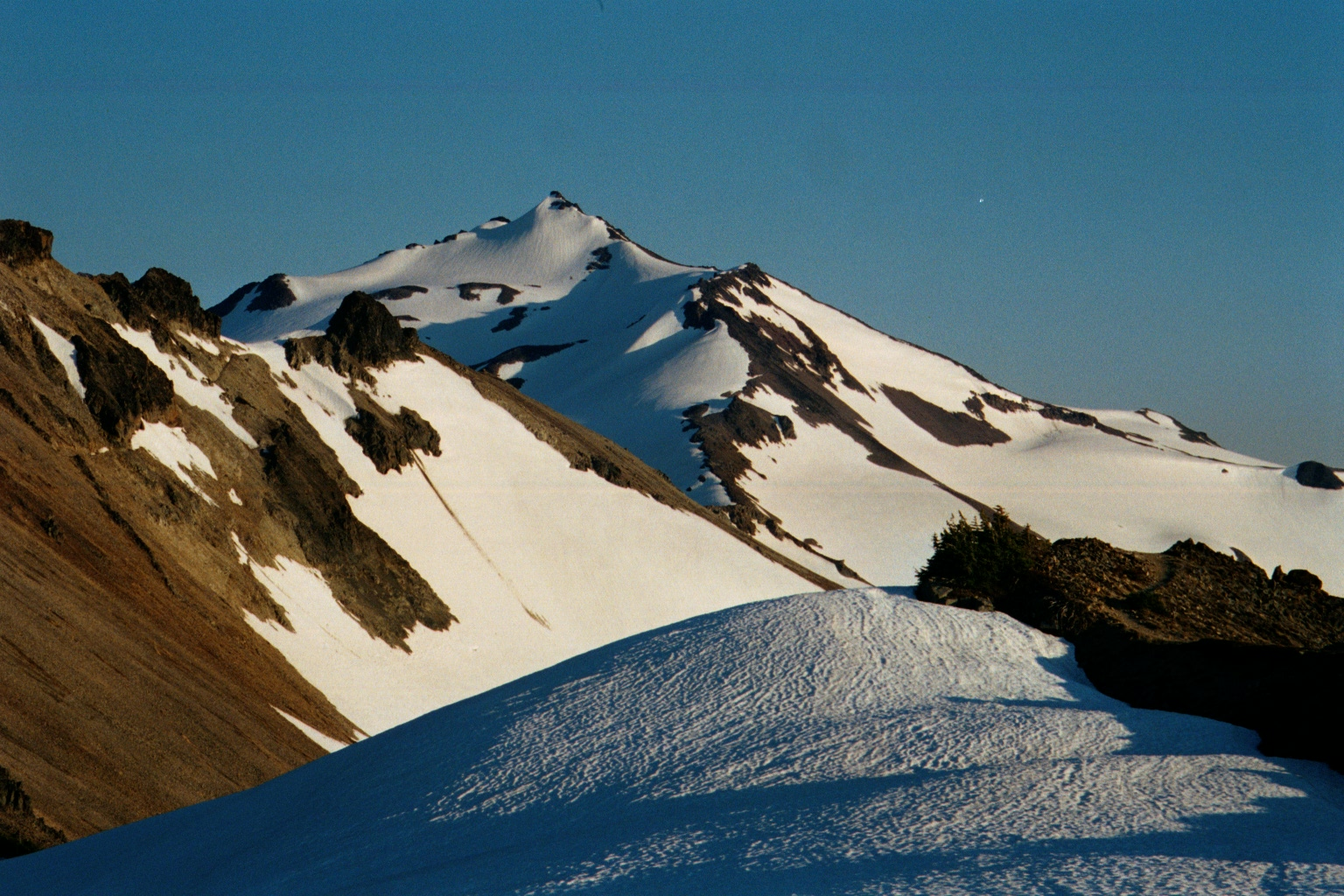
- Old Snowy Mountain in Goat Rocks Wilderness

- Location within Washington (state) Location within the United States
- Location: Washington, US
- Nearest city: Amboy, Washington
- Coordinates: 46°10′N 121°49′W
- Area: 1,321,506 acres (5,347.95 km^{2})
- Established: July 1, 1908
- Visitors: 1,800,000 (in 2005)
- Governing body: U.S. Forest Service
- Website: https://www.fs.usda.gov/r06/giffordpinchot

Gifford Pinchot National Forest is a national forest located in southern Washington, managed by the United States Forest Service. With an area of 1.32 million acres (5,300 km^{2}), it extends 116 km (72 mi) along the western slopes of Cascade Range from Mount Rainier National Park to the Columbia River. The forest straddles the crest of the South Cascades of Washington State, spread out over broad old-growth forests, high mountain meadows, several glaciers, and numerous volcanic peaks. The forest's highest point is at 12,276 ft (3,742 m) at the top of Mount Adams, the second-tallest volcano in the state after Rainier. Often found abbreviated GPNF on maps and in texts, it includes the 110,000-acre (450 km^{2}) Mount St. Helens National Volcanic Monument, established by Congress in 1982.

== History ==
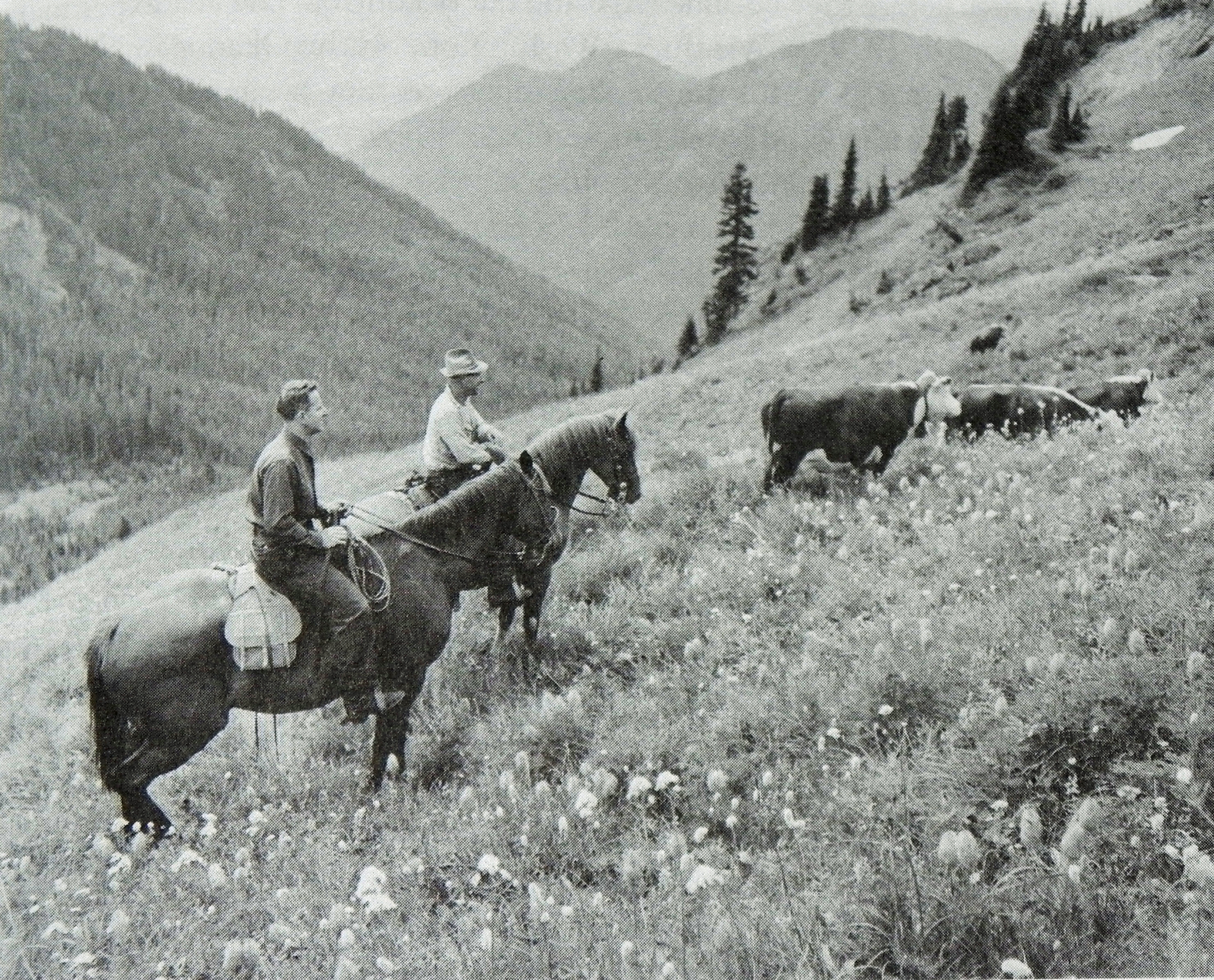
A U.S. Forest Service ranger and cattle grazer permittee on a hillside with cattle in Gifford Pinchot National Forest, Washington in 1949

Gifford Pinchot National Forest is one of the older national forests in the United States. Included as part of the Mount Rainier Forest Reserve in 1897, 941,440 acres (3,809.9 km^{2}) were set aside as the Columbia National Forest on July 1, 1908.

In 1855, the US government commissioned Washington Territory to negotiate land cession treaties with tribes around the forest. The Yakama tribe signed a treaty agreement that stipulated their moving to a reservation while maintaining off-reservation resource rights; however, the original treaty was then broken in 1916 when the Washington State Supreme Court ruled that Yakamas hunting off the reservation had to subscribe to state fish and game laws. Many tribes have continued to use the area's resources while encountering non-Native hunters, fishers, and recreation users.

It was later renamed the Gifford Pinchot National Forest during a dedication ceremony at La Wis Wis Campgrounds on June 15, 1949, in honor of Gifford Pinchot, one of the leading figures in the creation of the national forest system of the United States. His widow, fellow conservationist Cornelia Bryce Pinchot, was one of the speakers who addressed the audience assembled that day. In 1985 the non-profit Gifford Pinchot Task Force formed to promote conservation of the forest.

Part of the Pacific Crest Trail runs through the forest.

== Geography ==
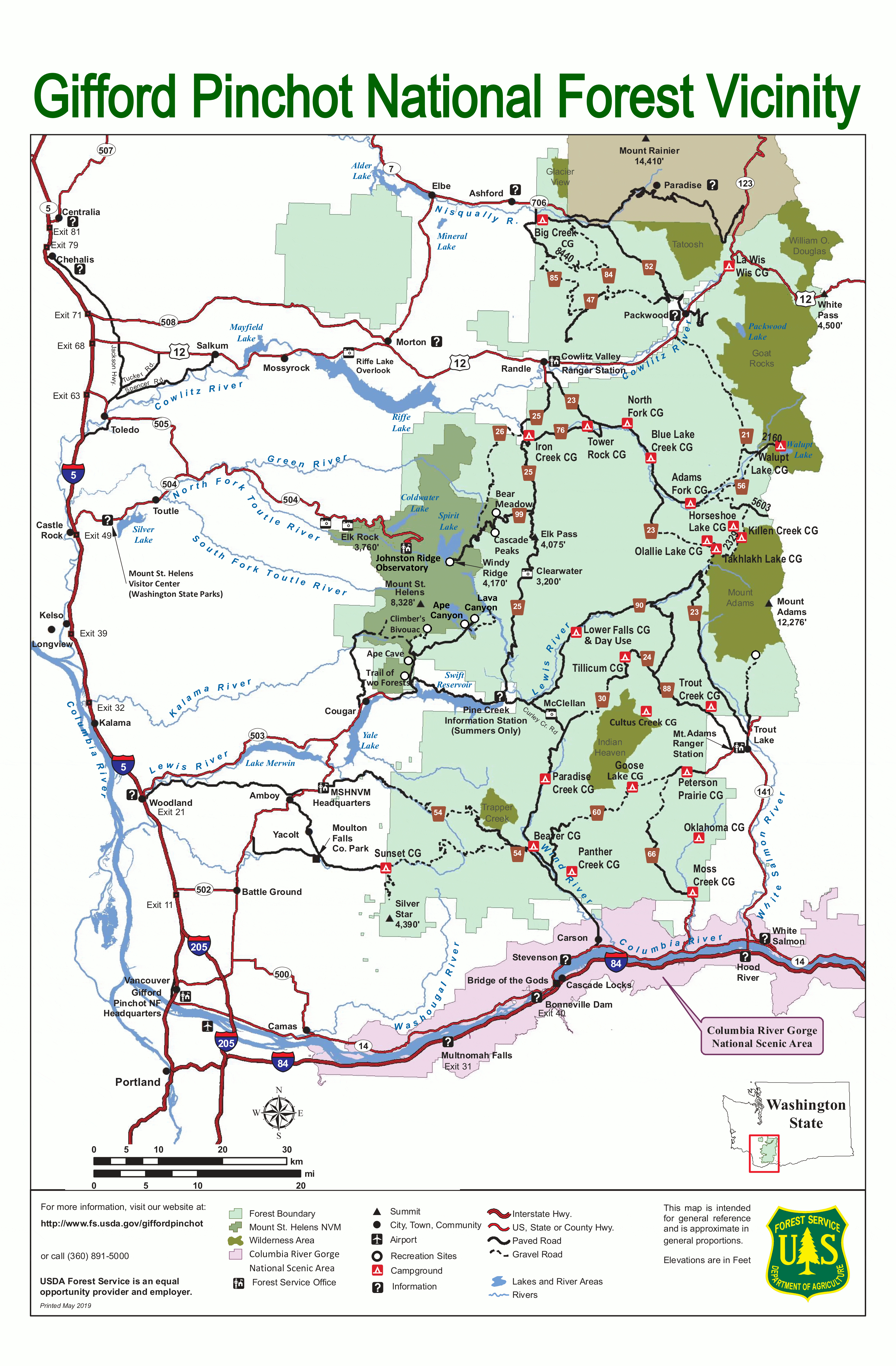
Map of Gifford Pinchot National Forest

Gifford Pinchot National Forest is located in a mountainous region approximately between Mount St. Helens to the west, Mount Adams to the east, Mount Rainier National Park to the north, and the Columbia River to the south. This region of Southwest Washington is noted for its complex topography and volcanic geology. About 65 percent of the forest acreage is located in Skamania County. In descending order of land area the others are Lewis, Yakima, Cowlitz, and Klickitat counties.

=== Major rivers ===
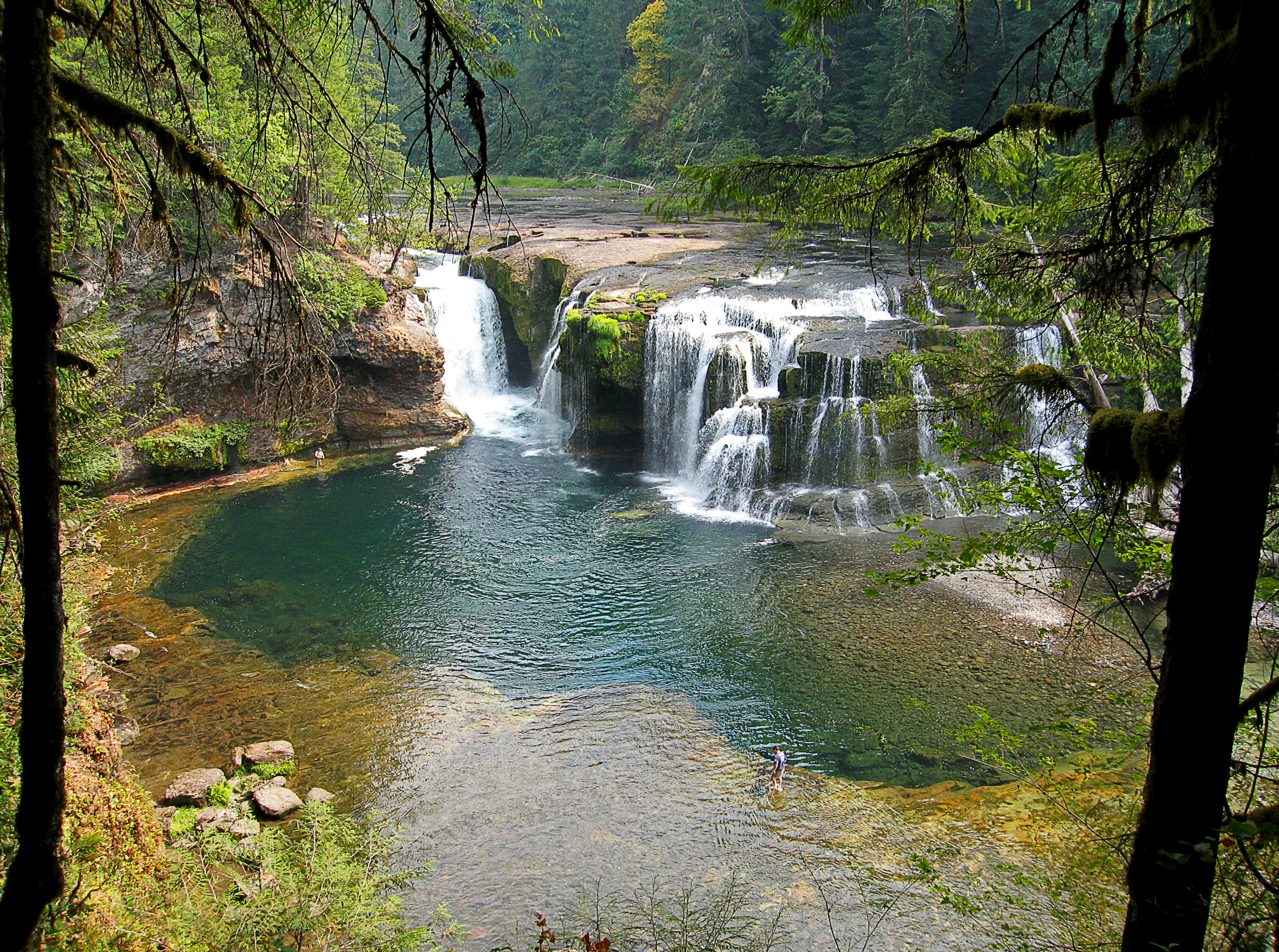
Lower Falls of the Lewis River

The Pacific Northwest brings abundant rainfall to the Gifford Pinchot National Forest, feeding an extensive network of rivers. The forest has only one river currently designated as Wild and Scenic, the White Salmon River, fed from glaciers high on Mount Adams. The Gifford Pinchot National Forest recommends adding four rivers to the Wild and Scenic System. They are the Lewis River, the Cispus River, the Clear Fork, and the Muddy Fork of the Cowlitz River. There are an additional thirteen rivers in the forest being studied for consideration into the National Wild and Scenic River System.

The following listed are the major streams and rivers of the Gifford Pinchot National Forest. Many of these provide excellent fishing.

- Cispus River
- Cowlitz River
- White Salmon River
- Little White Salmon River
- Wind River
- Lewis River
- Muddy River
- East Canyon Creek
- Skate Creek
- Iron Creek
- Trout Lake Creek
- Cultus Creek
- Quartz Creek
- Butter Creek
- Clear Creek
- Siouxon Creek
- Canyon Creek
- Johnson Creek

=== Major lakes ===
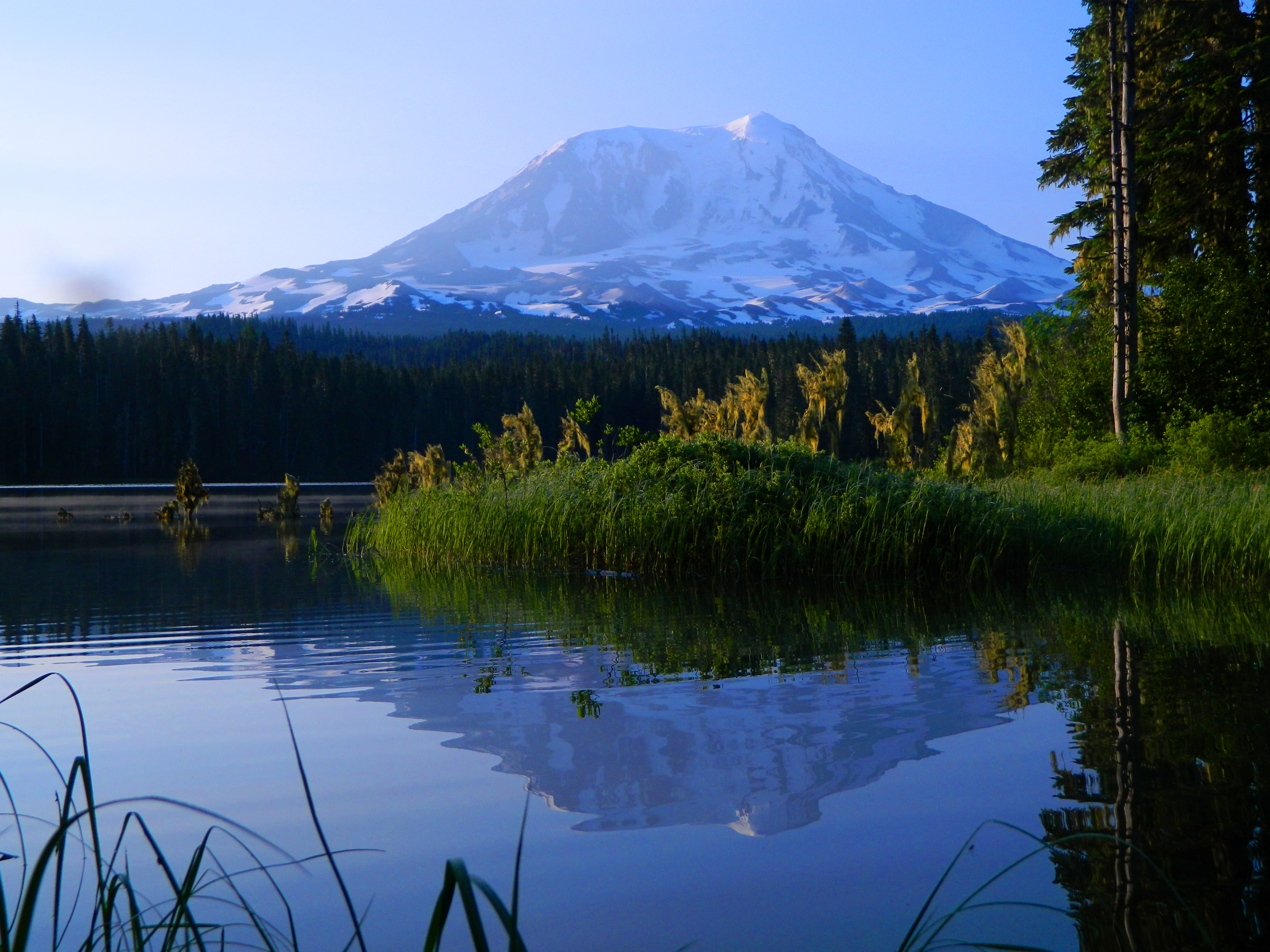
Mount Adams early morning reflection at Takhlakh Lake

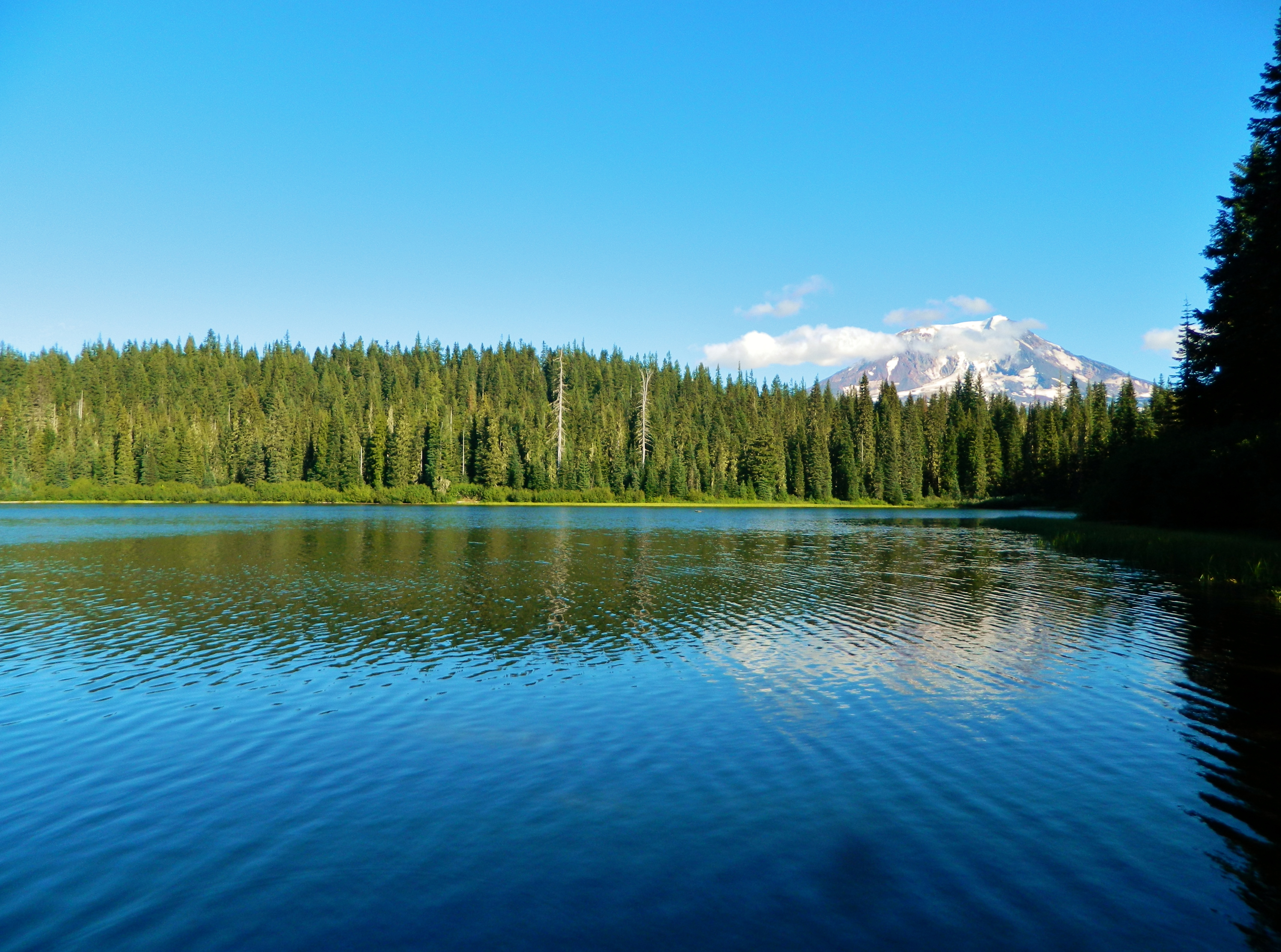
Mount Adams above Olallie Lake

The Gifford Pinchot National Forest includes many popular and secluded backcountry lakes. Most of the lakes offer excellent fishing. Goose Lake is known for the best fishing in the State of Washington.

The following table lists the major lakes of the Gifford Pinchot National Forest:

	Lake	Area
1	Spirit Lake	Mount St. Helens National Volcanic Monument
2	Blue Lake	Cispus River Valley
3	Walupt Lake	Base of Goat Rocks
4	Takhlakh Lake	Midway High Lakes Area, below Mount Adams
5	Forlorn Lakes	Indian Heaven Volcanic Field Area
6	Steamboat Lake	Between Indian Heaven Wilderness to the south and Lewis River to the north
7	Goose Lake	Indian Heaven Volcanic Field
8	Indian Heaven Wilderness Lakes	Indian Heaven Wilderness
9	Soda Peaks Lake	Trapper Creek Wilderness
10	Mt. Margaret Backcountry Lakes	Mount St. Helens National Volcanic Monument
11	Mosquito Lakes	North of Indian Heaven Wilderness and Indian Heaven Volcanic Field
12	Lake Scanewa	5 miles (east) from Taidnapam Park (at the west end of Riffe Lake)
13	Riffe Reservoir	Cowlitz River
14	Swift Reservoir	Lewis River
15	Mayfield Reservoir	Cowlitz River
16	Olallie Lake	Midway High Lakes Area, below Mount Adams
17	Horseshoe Lake	Midway High Lakes Area, below Mount Adams
18	Council Lake	Midway High Lakes Area, below Mount Adams
19	Tatoosh lakes	Tatoosh Wilderness, south of Mount Rainier National Park
20	Goat Lake	Goat Rocks Wilderness
21	Packwood Lake	large lake at the edge of Goat Rocks Wilderness

== Congressional action ==
Since 1964, Congressional action has established one national monument and seven wilderness areas in the Gifford Pinchot National Forest.

=== National Monuments ===
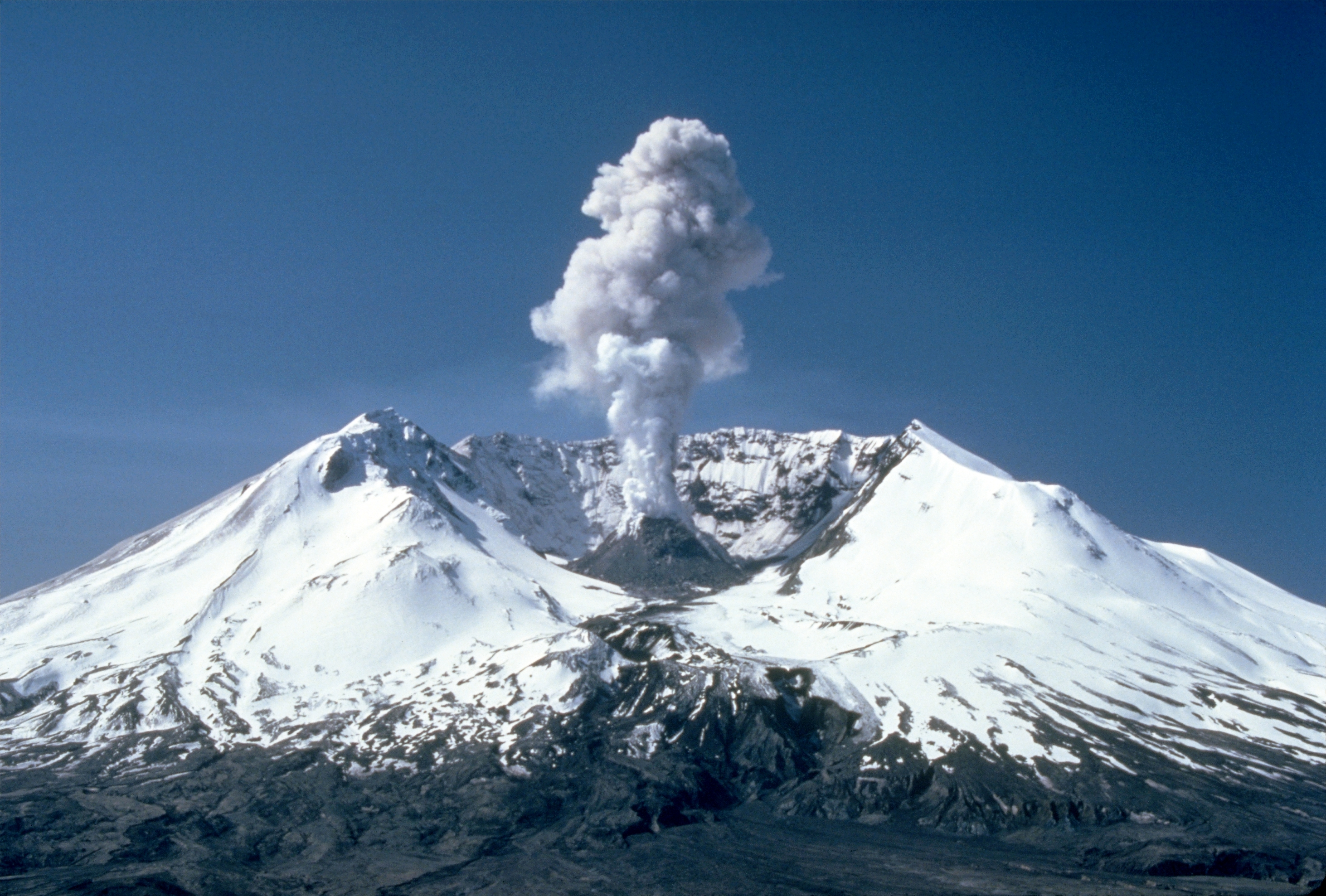
3,000 ft (1 km) steam plume of Mount St. Helens on May 19, 1982, two years after its major eruption

On August 26, 1982, congressional action established the Mount St. Helens National Volcanic Monument, after the cataclysmic eruption of Mount St. Helens in 1980.

=== Wilderness Areas ===
Congressional action since 1964 has established the following wilderness areas:

- Glacier View Wilderness – 3,060 acres (12.4 km^{2})
- Goat Rocks – 108,020 acres (437.1 km^{2}), part of which lies in neighboring Wenatchee NF
- Indian Heaven – 20,782 acres (84.1 km^{2})
- Mount Adams – 47,078 acres (190.5 km^{2})
- Tatoosh – 15,725 acres (63.6 km^{2})
- Trapper Creek – 5,969 acres (24.2 km^{2})
- William O. Douglas – 168,955 acres (683.7 km^{2}), most of which lies in neighboring Wenatchee NF
- The Shark Rock Wilderness was proposed in the mid-1970s by E.M. Sterling for the 75,000 acre Dark Divide Roadless Area in his book, The South Cascades. It is the largest unprotected roadless area (allowing motorized access) in the Washington Cascades, featuring sharp peaks, deep canyons, old-growth forests, and delicate subalpine meadows.

=== Points of interest ===
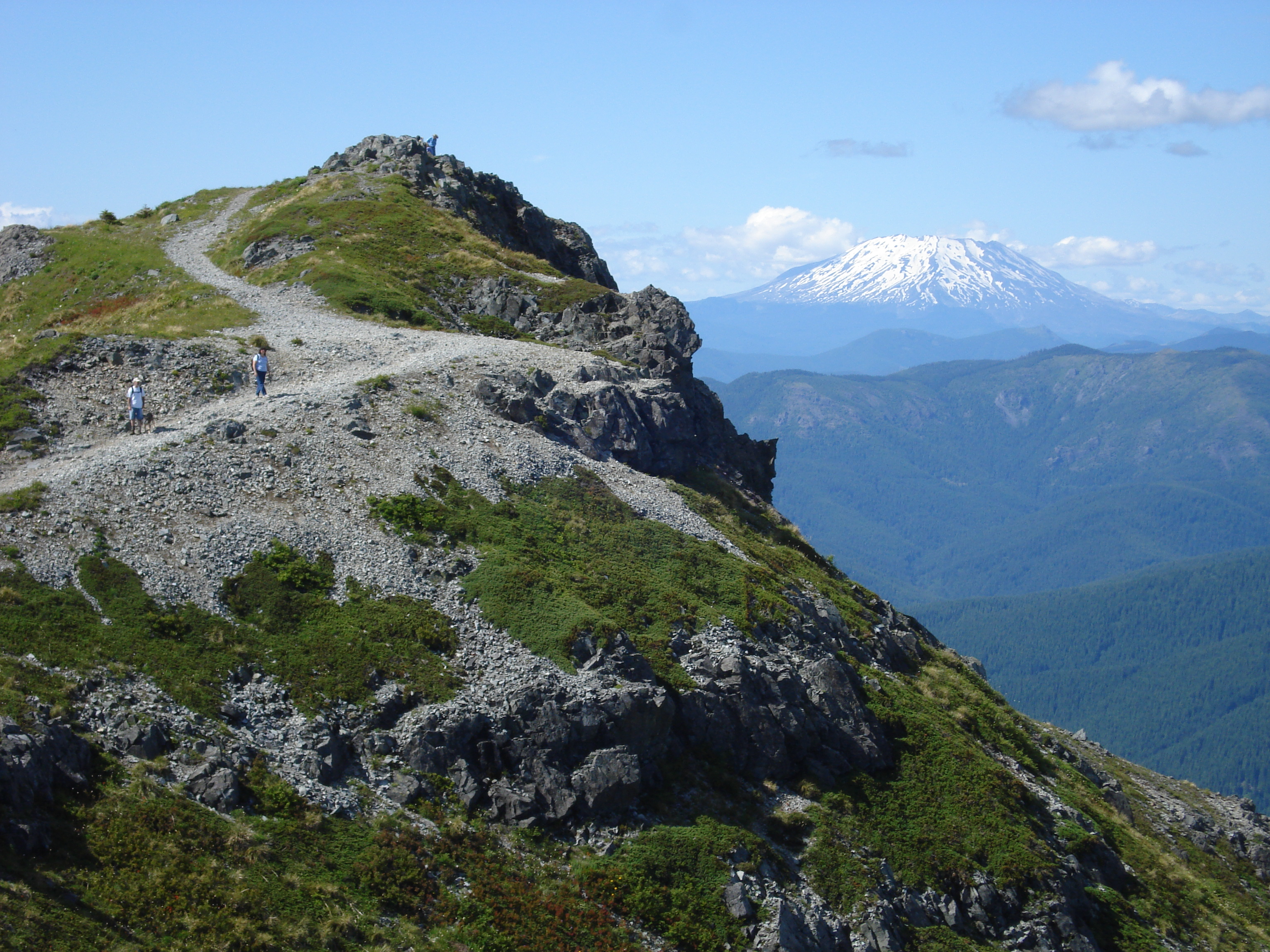
Summit of Silver Star with Mount St. Helens in the background

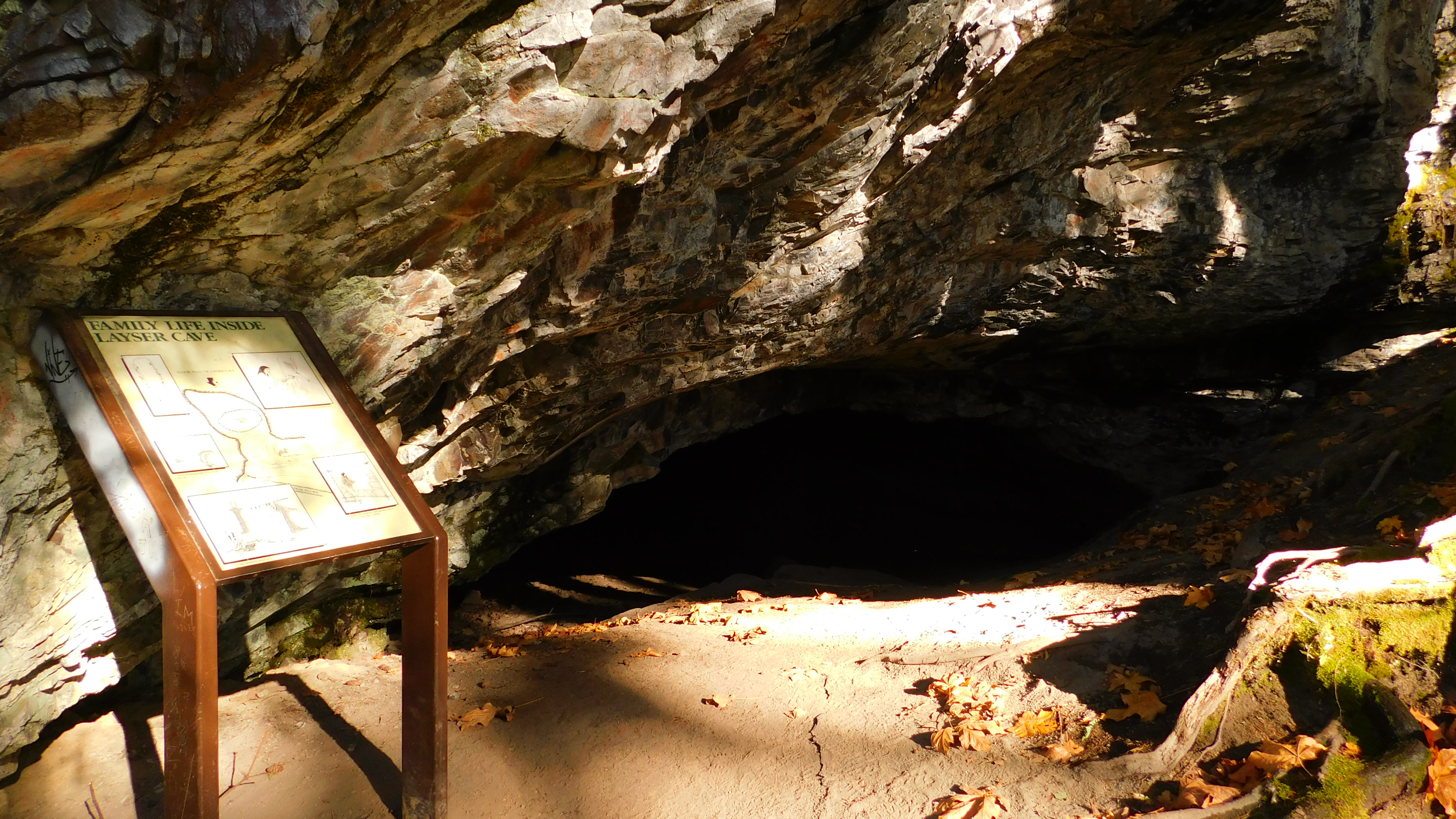
Layser Cave, 2023

The forest also offers the following special areas and points of interest:

- Ape Caves
- Big Lava Bed
- Carson National Fish Hatchery
- Dark Divide Roadless Area
- Lava tubes, caves, and casts (notably the Ice Caves)
- Layser Cave, a dwelling for Native Americans 7,000 years ago and a former archeological site.
- Lone Butte Wildlife Emphasis Area
- Midway High Lakes Area
- Packwood Lake
- Sawtooth Berry Fields, huckleberry fields reserved for Yakama tribe use. Designated in 1932 through a handshake agreement between forest supervisor J.R. Bruckart and Yakama Chief William Yallup.
- Silver Star Scenic Area

== Forest Service management ==
The forest supervisor's office is located in Vancouver, Washington. There are local ranger district offices in Randle, Amboy, and Trout Lake. The forest is named after the first chief of the United States Forest Service, Gifford Pinchot. Washington towns near entrances of the forest include Cougar, Randle, Packwood, Trout Lake, and Carson.

In August 2024, the Williams Mine fire burned over 11,900 acres of land within the Gifford Pinchot forest. In response, firefighters with the Mount St. Helen's Forest District deployed protective wrappings to preserve several historic buildings that were more than 100 years old. This included the Gotchen Creek Guard Station - the oldest building in the forest.

== Ecology ==
A 1993 Forest Service study estimated that the extent of old growth in the Forest was 198,000 acres (80,000 ha), some of which is contained within its wilderness areas.

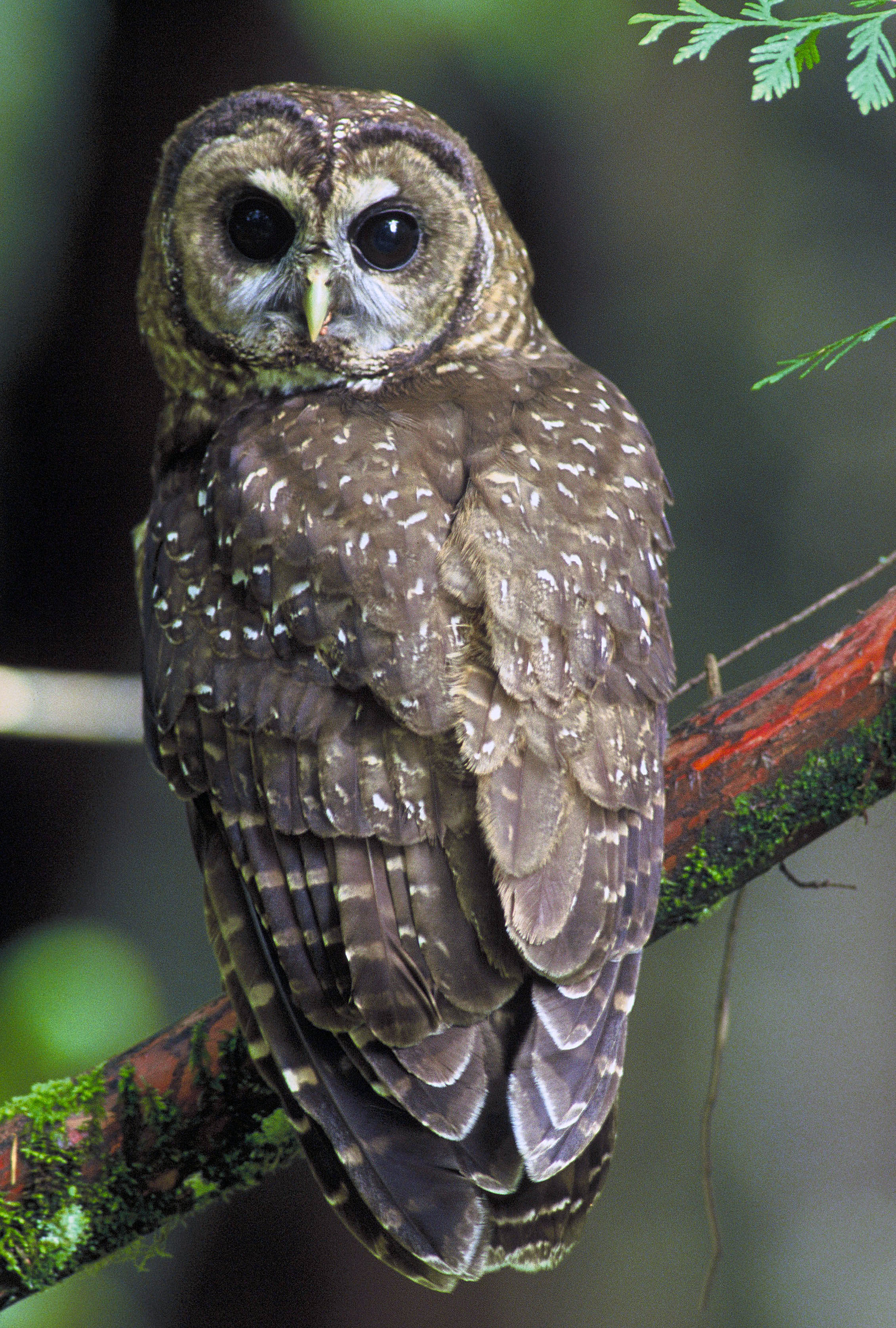
Northern Spotted Owl, found in the Gifford Pinchot National Forest

The Gifford Pinchot National Forest is the native habitat for several threatened species which include the spotted owl (threatened 2012) as well as multiple species of Northwest fish like the bull trout (threatened 1998), chinook salmon (threatened 2011), coho salmon (threatened 2011) and steelhead (threatened 2011).

The area is also home to several large predators including black bears and mountain lions. The US Forest Service advises visitors to follow bear country and cougar country protocols such as properly disposing of trash and food scraps.

People for over 6,000 years have made an impact on the ecology of the Gifford Pinchot National Forest. Native Americans hunted in high meadows below receding glaciers. The natives then began to manage the forest to meet their own needs. One method they used was to burn specific areas to help in the huckleberry production. About 338 spots, more than 6,000 culturally modified trees were identified, of which 3,000 are now protected. Archaeological investigations are supported by the United States Forest Service.

The forest was home to the Big Tree at the southern flank of Mt Adams, one of the world's largest Ponderosa Trees.

== Huckleberry harvesting ==
Gifford Pinchot National Forest operates the only large-scale commercial huckleberry harvesting program among the region's national forests. Huckleberries have proven challenging to cultivate, so consequently they are harvested commercially each summer from wild populations. Historically, treaties with Native American tribes protected huckleberry patches for tribal use, such as the Treaty of 1855 with the Yakama. After the establishment of the Forest Service in 1905 lands in the Gifford Pinchot were declared public and the berries were considered a "special forest product" that could be publicly harvested. In 1932, the Forest Service agreed in a handshake agreement that collection in 2,800 acres of Sawtooth fields would be exclusively for River People. Signs on Forest Road 24 mark this area to the east of the road. The increased activity of commercial harvesters has made it challenging to locate undisturbed, productive berry patches, which were once primarily utilized by local pickers.

In the National Forest, buyers purchase huckleberries from harvesters at $27.50 per gallon. The forest issues seasonal permits to commercial pickers, priced at $105, which allow a maximum harvest of 70 gallons. An alternative two-week permit costs $60, with no specified gallon limit. The forest sold 928 permits the previous year, generating a total revenue of $83,445.

== See also ==
- List of national forests of the United States
- Wind River Arboretum
