= Big Tree (Washington tree) =

Former pine tree in Washington

Coordinates: 46.0588°N 121.5296°W

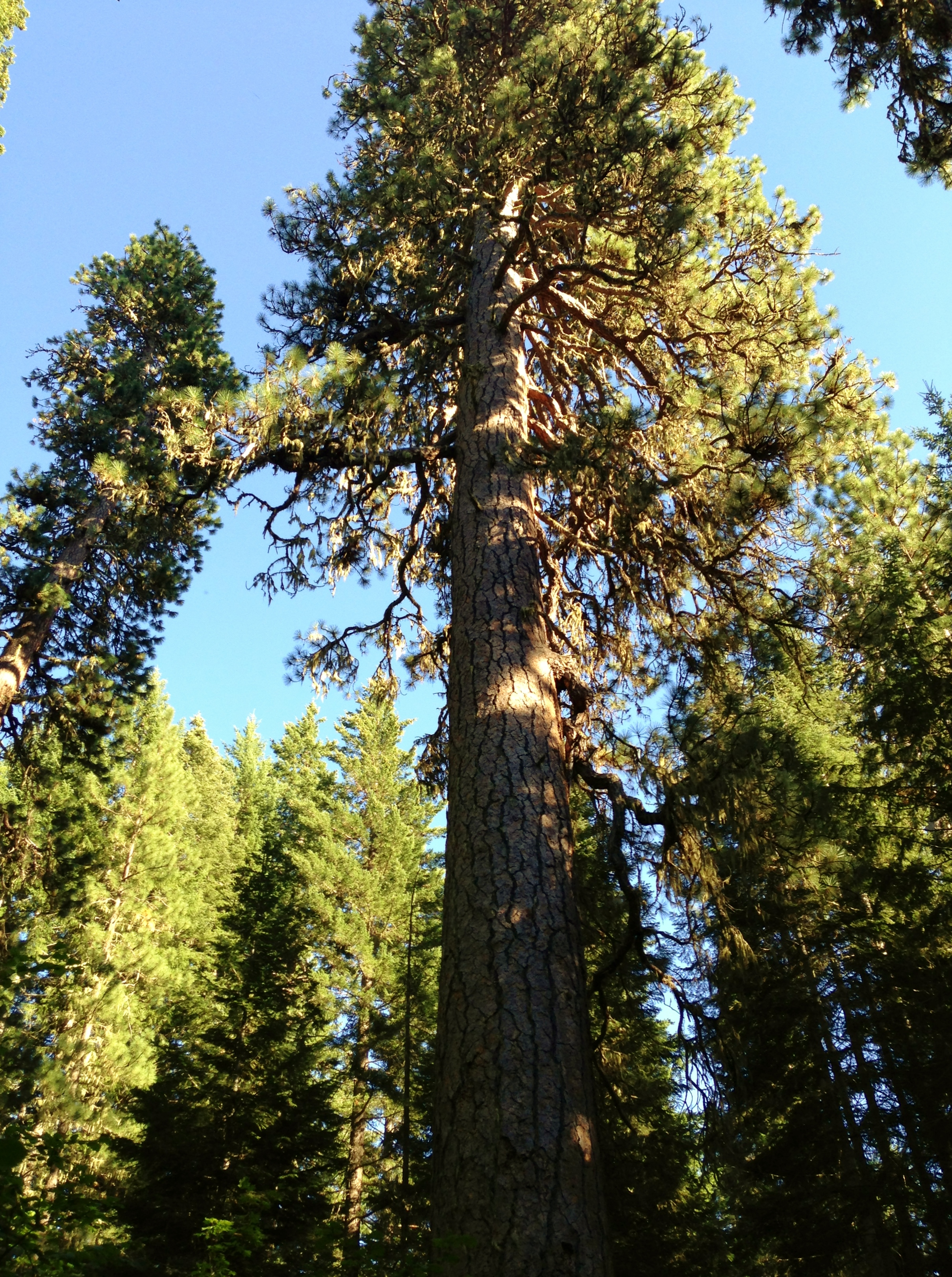
Trout Lake Big Tree in 2013

The Big Tree (also known as the Trout Lake Big Tree) was a massive Ponderosa pine tree in an old-growth pine and fir forest in southern Washington state, at the southern base of Mount Adams. The area is managed by the Mount Adams Ranger District of the Gifford Pinchot National Forest. The tree was 202 feet (62 m) tall with a diameter of 7 feet (210 cm), and was one of the largest known Ponderosa pines in the world. After stress by attacks from mountain pine beetles its death in 2015 was confirmed the following year.

== Accessibility ==
From the small farming community of Trout Lake, the Big Tree Interpretive Site can be accessed via Forest Road 80 and 8020. The interpretive site offers the opportunity to view or picnic at the base of the tree.

== Age ==
Its age was unknown, partially because of rot in its center sections.

Despite having immense tracts of old growth conifers, the State of Washington is one of two states that lacks a state coordinator to find, track and keep current records on important trees.

== See also ==
- List of individual trees
