= William Yallup =

Yakama leader

William Yallup is a name shared by several generations of leaders from the Yakama Nation of Washington. Chief William Yallup led all Native Americans on the Columbian River from the 1920s to the 1950s. His grandson, William Yallup Sr., was a Yakama tribal councilman who supported the recovery of the salmon population, as well as the rights of tribal fisherman along the river. His great-grandson, Bill Yallup Jr., whose Yakama name is Tamaask, became chief of the Cowlitz Indian Tribe in 2008.

== William Yallup Sr. ==
William Yallup Sr. (born September 1926, Ellensburg, Washington - died June 17, 2006, Toppenish, Washington) was a longtime Yakama tribal councilman. A direct descendant of treaty signer Wish-Och-Kmpits, he was born in a tepee at the annual Labor Day Rodeo. He was raised with traditional Yakama teachings and spoke both Yakama and English. As a young man he joined the Army and spent 12 years in the Marine Corps Reserves.

He began serving in tribal government in 1960 and was elected as a Tribal Councilman in 1972. During his tenure, he served as the Chief Judge of the Yakama Tribal Court and on nearly every Tribal Council committee, and was well known for his commitment to preserving tribal resources and the Yakamas' traditional rights reserved in their 1855 treaty. Yallup also sat on regional boards dealing with resource preservation and Northwest tribes and for a time was the state Indian Affairs Commissioner.
