= Wind River (Washington) =

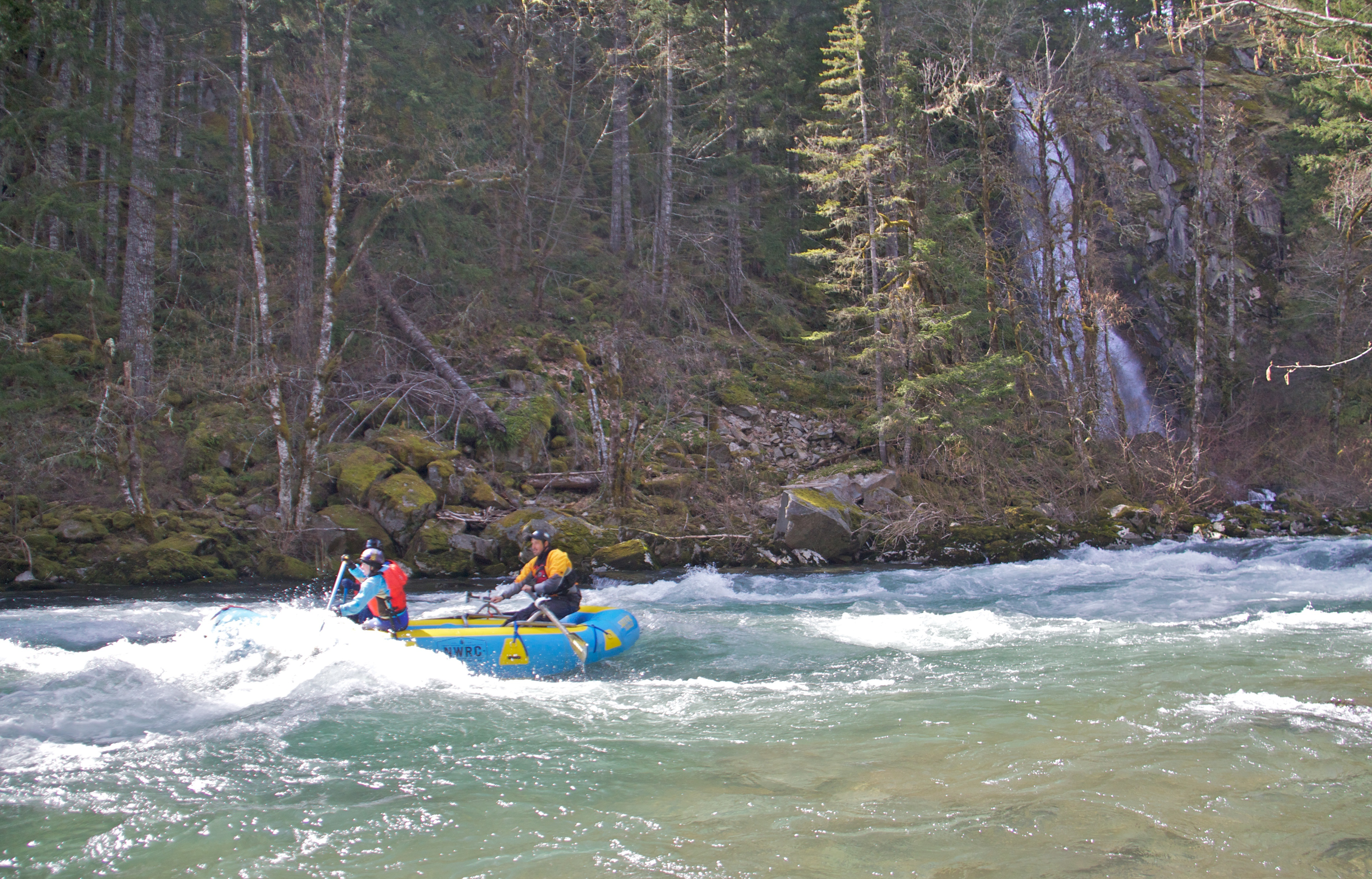
- Rafting the Wind River

- Location of the mouth of the Wind River in Washington Wind River (Washington) (the United States)

Location
- Country: United States
- State: Washington

Physical characteristics
- Source: Cascade Range
  - location: McLellan Meadows, Gifford Pinchot National Forest
  - coordinates: 46°00′11″N 121°53′48″W
  - elevation: 2,987 ft (910 m)
- Mouth: Columbia River
  - location: Carson
  - coordinates: 45°42′47″N 121°47′37″W
  - elevation: 79 ft (24 m)
- Length: 30 mi (48 km)
- Basin size: 224 sq mi (580 km^{2})
- Discharge
  - location: Near Carson, WA
  - average: 1,209 cuft\s

The Wind River is a tributary of the Columbia River, in the U.S. state of Washington. Its entire course of 30 miles (48 km) lies within Skamania County. Crusattes River is an old variant name.

When Lewis and Clark passed by the river on October 29, 1805, they called it the ‘New Timbered River’ after the Oregon Ash trees in the area.

== Course ==
The Wind River originates in the Cascade Range, south of Mount Adams and Mount St. Helens. It flows generally south through Gifford Pinchot National Forest, joining the Columbia River near Carson, in the Columbia River Gorge.

== See also ==
- List of rivers of Washington (state)
- List of tributaries of the Columbia River
