= Palmer Glacier =

Glacier on Mount Hood, Oregon, United States

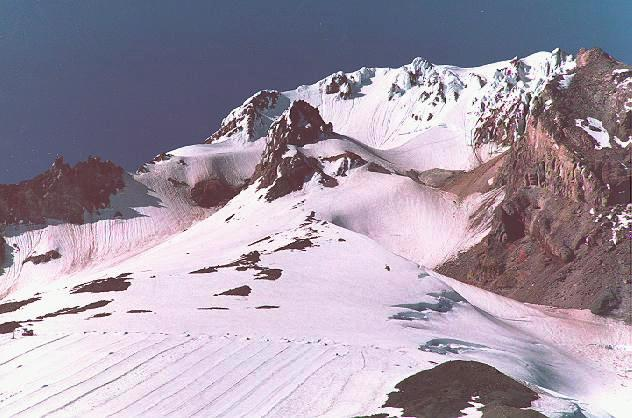
- Mount Hood summit and Palmer Glacier

- Location within Oregon
- Type: Mountain snowfield/extinct glacier
- Location: Clackamas County, Oregon, United States
- Coordinates: 45°21′09″N 121°42′27″W
- Length: .8 mi (1.3 km)
- Terminus: Talus
- Status: Extinct

Palmer Glacier is an extinct glacier on the south slopes of Mount Hood in the U.S. state of Oregon. With glacial ice movement having stopped in the mid-1980s, it is now considered a snowfield rather than an active glacier. The former glacier, now snowfield, is situated at an elevation range of 9,300 to 6,200 feet (2,800 to 1,900 m), and was named for Joel Palmer, an Oregon pioneer. Palmer Glacier is the most well-known of the twelve glaciers on the mountain, despite no longer technically qualifying as a glacier, and is a popular destination for snowsports enthusiasts as it is the only US resort that consistently runs its chairlifts from winter through summer.

Much of the lower section of the snowfield is within the Timberline ski area, and can be accessed by Sno-Cat or chairlift, conditions permitting. Palmer chairlift, which ascends to an elevation of 8,500 feet (2,590m) provides lift assisted access to the snowfield and runs from spring to early fall when conditions allow. High wind and copious upper mountain snow prevent Palmer lift from being run in the winter. The lift also provides easier access to upper mountain terrain for those seeking to summit Mt. Hood, instead of requiring a full hike to the summit. Skis or a snowboard are required to board Palmer lift, however the Magic Mile lift which accesses the lower snowfield can be ridden at a discounted price without skis or a snowboard.

The glacier is a remnant of the massive glaciers that formed during the last ice age, and is the only location in North America that can provide skiing and snowboarding all twelve months of the year. However the ski and snowboard season typically ends in September or August and is dependent on snowfield conditions, it is rare for the season to extend beyond September.

The glacier was considered a snowfield until a Mazama committee (Note: The Mazamas committee consisted of Rodney L. Glisan, L. A. Nelson, Earl A. Marshall, Raymond Smith, Fred McNeil, Everett Philpoe, T. Raymond Conway, and Fred W. Stadter.) investigated on October 19, 1924, and determined it was, in fact, a glacier and should be named on maps. For some time after that it was known as Salmon River Glacier as it is the headwaters of the Salmon River. Significant salting of the snowfield occurs yearly to allow prolonged skiing and snowboarding which leads to increased pollution of the Salmon River along with general trash and waste left at the ski resort flowing down the river.

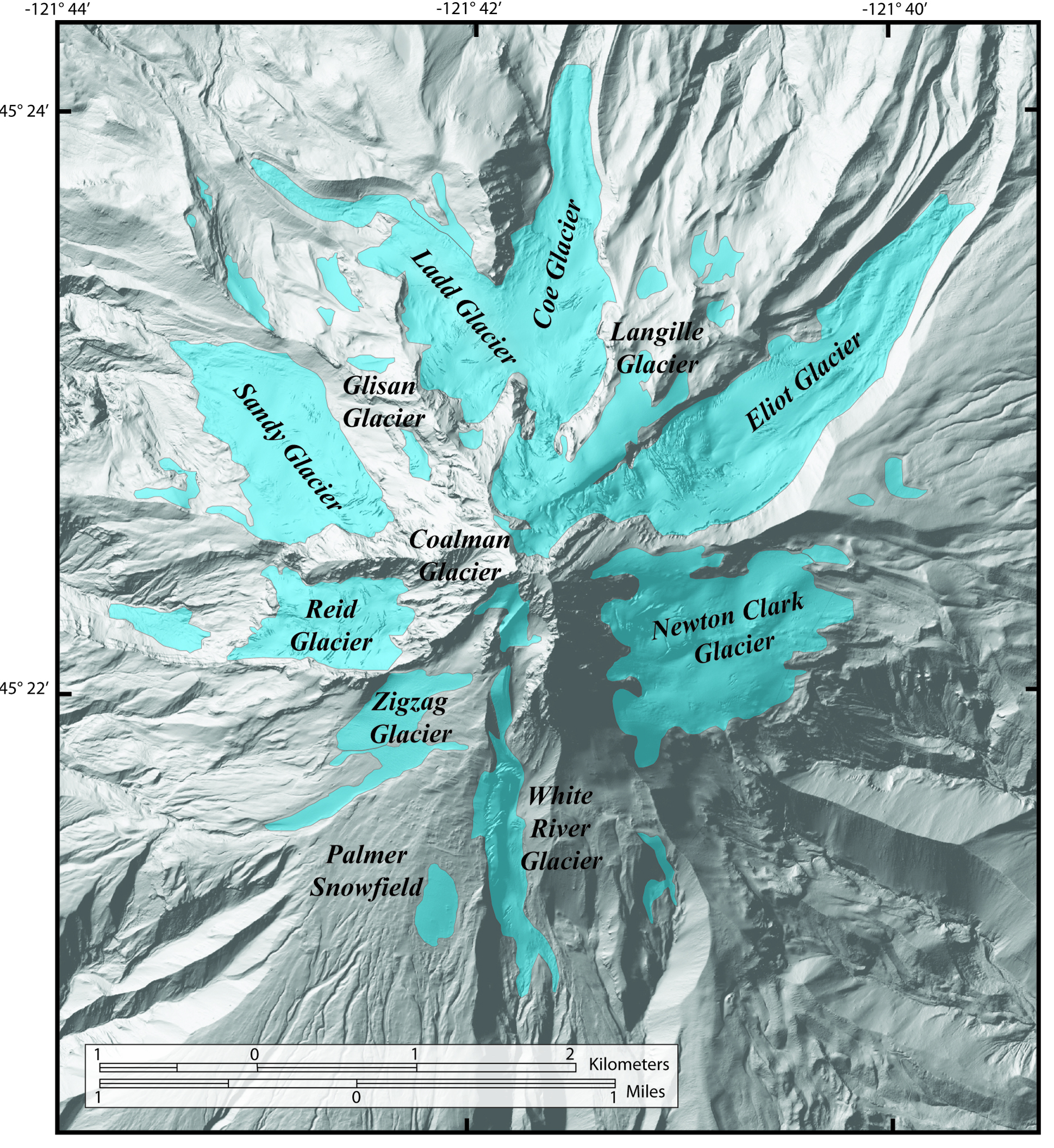
Modern LiDAR map of Mt. Hood reflecting its snowfield status

Palmer likely began as a snowfield that thickened into a glacier over time. In 1981, the U.S.G.S. determined it had reached over 200 feet thick, but by the mid-1980s all measured ice movement had stopped completely and the glacier was declared dead. It has since been considered a snowfield in modern U.S.G.S. LiDAR maps. The snowfield is shrinking annually and continues to retreat due to climate change and global heating trends.

Silcox Hut is a small lodge originally built as a warming hut for skiers and climbers, but is now available for group rental for events and rustic overnight accommodation. It is located near the base of the glacier, about 1,000 feet (300 m) vertically up from Timberline Lodge near the upper terminal of the Magic Mile ski lift.

The snowfield is bounded on the east by a ridge shared with White River Canyon (which contains White River Glacier) and on the west by Zigzag Glacier and Zigzag Canyon, the source of the Zigzag River. The upper glacier narrows to a vertex near the base of Steel Cliff, an area known as Triangle Moraine. Below the glacier, the snowfield varies significantly seasonally, varying in length by almost 2 miles (3.2 km).

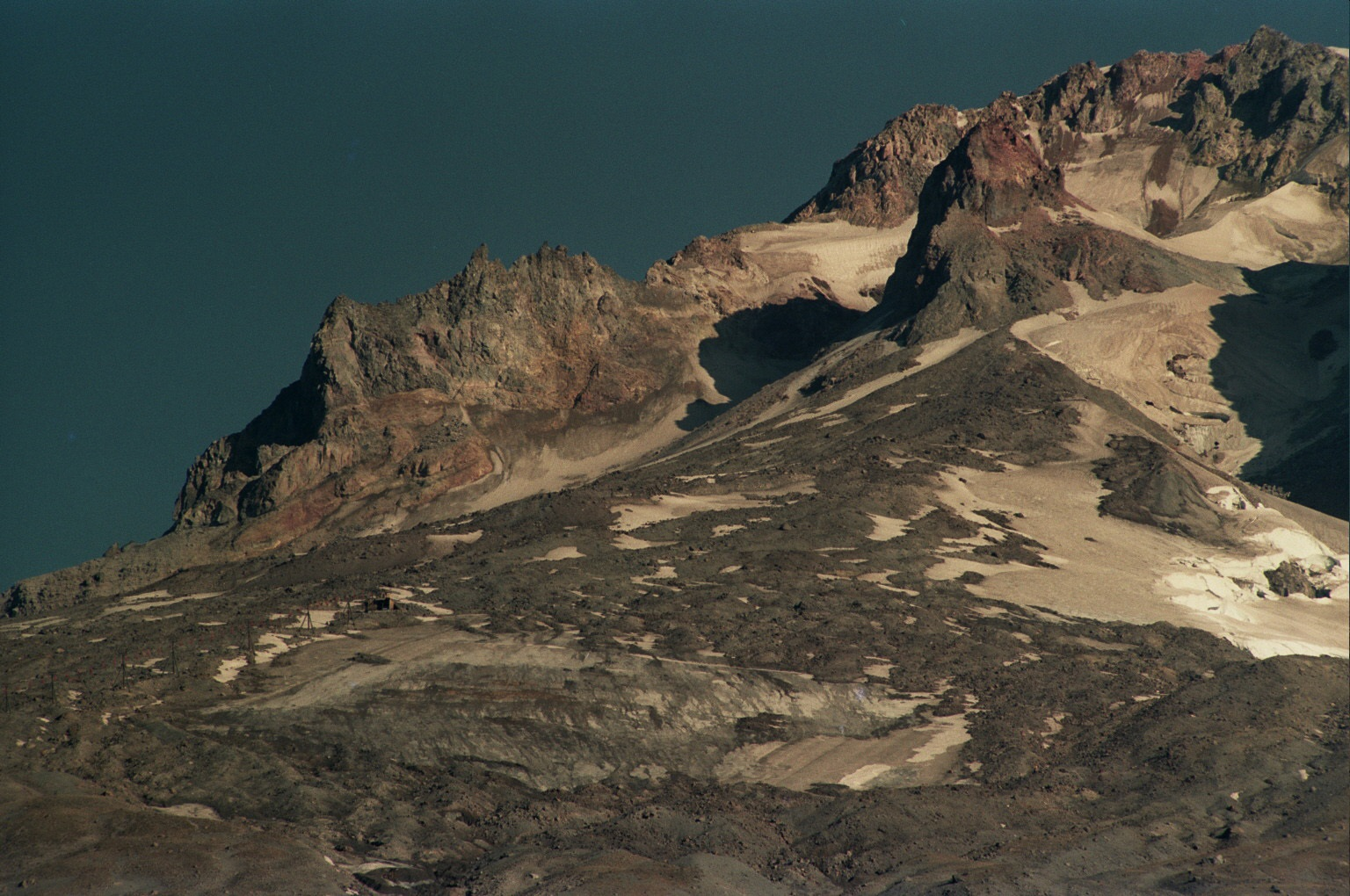
Palmer Glacier in mid-autumn

During the summer ski season (approximately May through September), the upper half of the Palmer Chairlift terrain is divided into lanes. Lanes nearest the lift are open to the public, while the others are allocated to ski and snowboard camps, ski coaches, and other organizations. Typically the camps and coaches begin their skiing/boarding earlier in the day and finish before public closure which allows the public to access the entirety of the terrain.

Between late summer and the first snowfalls of autumn, the glacier is generally unusable for skiing and riding.

== Climate ==
Climate data for Palmer Express Top 45.3588 N, 121.7062 W, Elevation: 8,468 ft (2,581 m) (1991–2020 normals)
Month	Jan	Feb	Mar	Apr	May	Jun	Jul	Aug	Sep	Oct	Nov	Dec	Year
Mean daily maximum °F (°C)	28.7 (−1.8)	28.0 (−2.2)	28.9 (−1.7)	32.5 (0.3)	41.2 (5.1)	48.1 (8.9)	59.2 (15.1)	59.5 (15.3)	54.2 (12.3)	43.5 (6.4)	31.9 (−0.1)	27.3 (−2.6)	40.3 (4.6)
Daily mean °F (°C)	23.3 (−4.8)	21.4 (−5.9)	21.3 (−5.9)	23.9 (−4.5)	31.5 (−0.3)	37.6 (3.1)	47.2 (8.4)	47.6 (8.7)	43.0 (6.1)	34.4 (1.3)	26.0 (−3.3)	22.2 (−5.4)	31.6 (−0.2)
Mean daily minimum °F (°C)	17.9 (−7.8)	14.7 (−9.6)	13.8 (−10.1)	15.3 (−9.3)	21.8 (−5.7)	27.2 (−2.7)	35.2 (1.8)	35.7 (2.1)	31.7 (−0.2)	25.2 (−3.8)	20.2 (−6.6)	17.0 (−8.3)	23.0 (−5.0)
Average precipitation inches (mm)	16.43 (417)	12.39 (315)	13.05 (331)	10.35 (263)	6.78 (172)	5.44 (138)	1.31 (33)	1.87 (47)	4.39 (112)	9.95 (253)	16.14 (410)	17.33 (440)	115.43 (2,931)
Source: PRISM Climate Group

== See also ==
- List of glaciers in the United States
