= Riblet Tramway Company =

Former Charlift Manufacturer

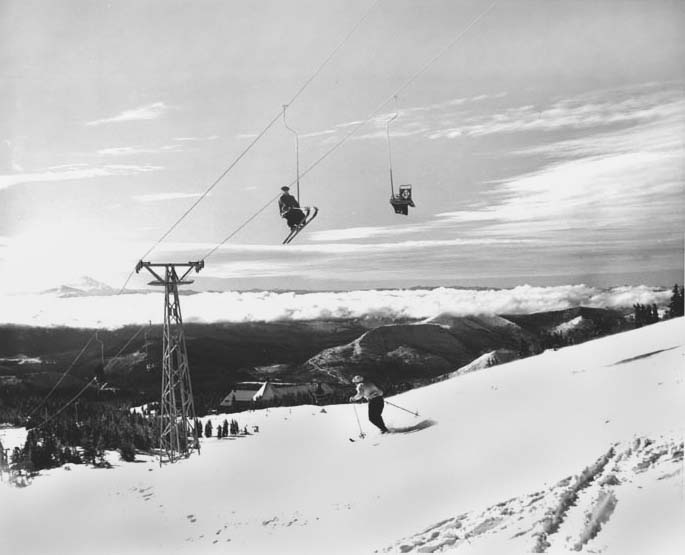
- Riblet's first chairlift, the Magic Mile at Timberline, as seen in the early 1940s. In the background is Timberline Lodge.
- Company type: Private
- Founded: 1908; 117 years ago
- Founders: Byron Christian "BC" Riblet; Royal N. Riblet
- Defunct: 2003
- Headquarters: Spokane, Washington, United States
- Products: Chairlifts; Aerial tramways; Gondola lifts

The Riblet Tramway Company of Spokane, Washington, which operated from 1908 to 2003, was once the largest ski chairlift manufacturer in the world.

== History ==
The company was founded by Byron Christian Riblet, who was born in Osage, Iowa, in 1865 and earned a degree in Civil Engineering. Arriving in Spokane in 1885, his first work was laying out railway and streetcar lines. He also built dams and irrigation projects.

In 1896, Riblet was contracted to erect an ore tramway designed by the Finlayson company at the Noble Five silver mine in Sandon, British Columbia, to assist in moving ore down Reco Mountain to the mill at Cody. Apparently Riblet thought he was coming to build a streetcar line. Even so, Riblet decided he could improve the mining tram performance. Over time, Riblet raised more aerial tramways in the booming mining district, building 30 in the next decade. Riblet returned to Spokane in 1908, after working in the Kootenays, to found the Riblet Tramway Company. The company, which specialized in mining tramways, built them in Alaska, Canada, the western United States, and South America.

Riblet built its first chairlift in 1938 at Mount Hood, Oregon. Byron Riblet died in 1952, but the company boomed with the postwar rise of ski resorts. Skiing gained in popularity, and soon ski lifts became the major part of the Riblet Tramway Company's business. They built more than 400 lifts, particularly in Washington, Oregon, and California, and as far away as Australia, New Zealand and Chile; one secondhand American lift has also been relocated to Pakistan. They have the most double chair lifts operating in the U.S.

=== 1974 World's Fair ===
During Expo '74 Riblet built both the skyride a Gondola tramway over Spokane Falls and the A&W SkyFloat a chairlift that went over the fairgrounds.

After the World's Fair, the chairlift was dismantled and went to Schweitzer Mountain. The Gondola became one of the attractions at Riverfront Park and was replaced by a new Gondola system in 2005.

=== Decline ===
The company only built fixed-grip lifts, whose chair grip is woven into the haul rope rather than clamped onto it. But other technologies eventually proved more popular. In early 2003, the firm announced that it was no longer viable and would go out of business.

== See also ==
- Detachable chairlift: the technological successor to the fixed-grip chairlift
- Magic Mile, Riblet's first chairlift

== Sources ==
Martin J. Wells (December 2005). Tramway Titan: Byron Riblet, Wire Rope and Western Resource Towns. Trafford Publishing, Victoria. ISBN 978-1-4120-5093-7.
