= Cloud Cap Inn =

Historic building in Oregon, United States

- U.S. National Register of Historic Places
- U.S. Historic district – Contributing property
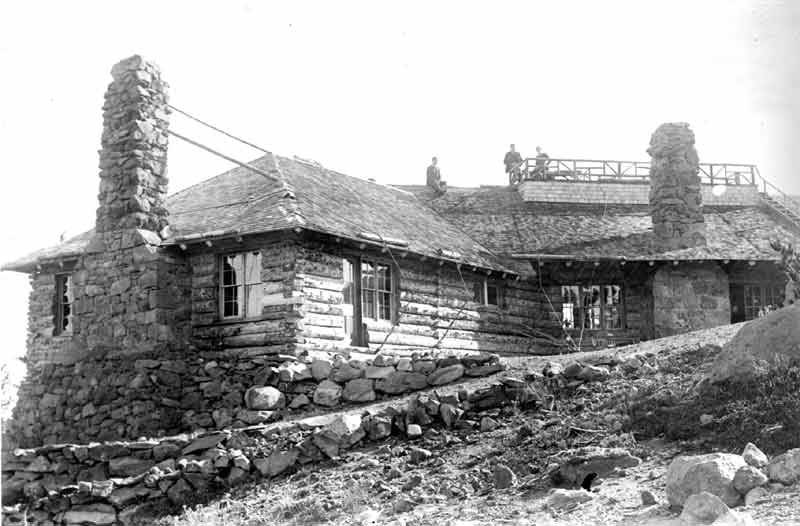
- Cloud Cap Inn ca. 1889
- Location: Mount Hood National Forest, on the northeast flank of Mount Hood
- Nearest city: Parkdale, Oregon
- Coordinates: 45°24′15″N 121°39′16″W
- Area: 1 acre (0.40 ha)
- Built: 1889
- Architect: William H. Whidden
- Part of: Cloud Cap – Tilly Jane Recreation Area Historic District (ID81000485)
- NRHP reference No.: 74001687
- Added to NRHP: October 18, 1974

The Cloud Cap Inn is a historic building located high on Mount Hood, Oregon, United States. It was a luxury inn for mountain climbers that included telephones as early as 1894.

The inn opened in 1889 and closed as a business in 1946.

Since the 1950s, the Crag Rats search and rescue group has used and maintained the inn.

The building was listed on the National Register of Historic Places in 1974.

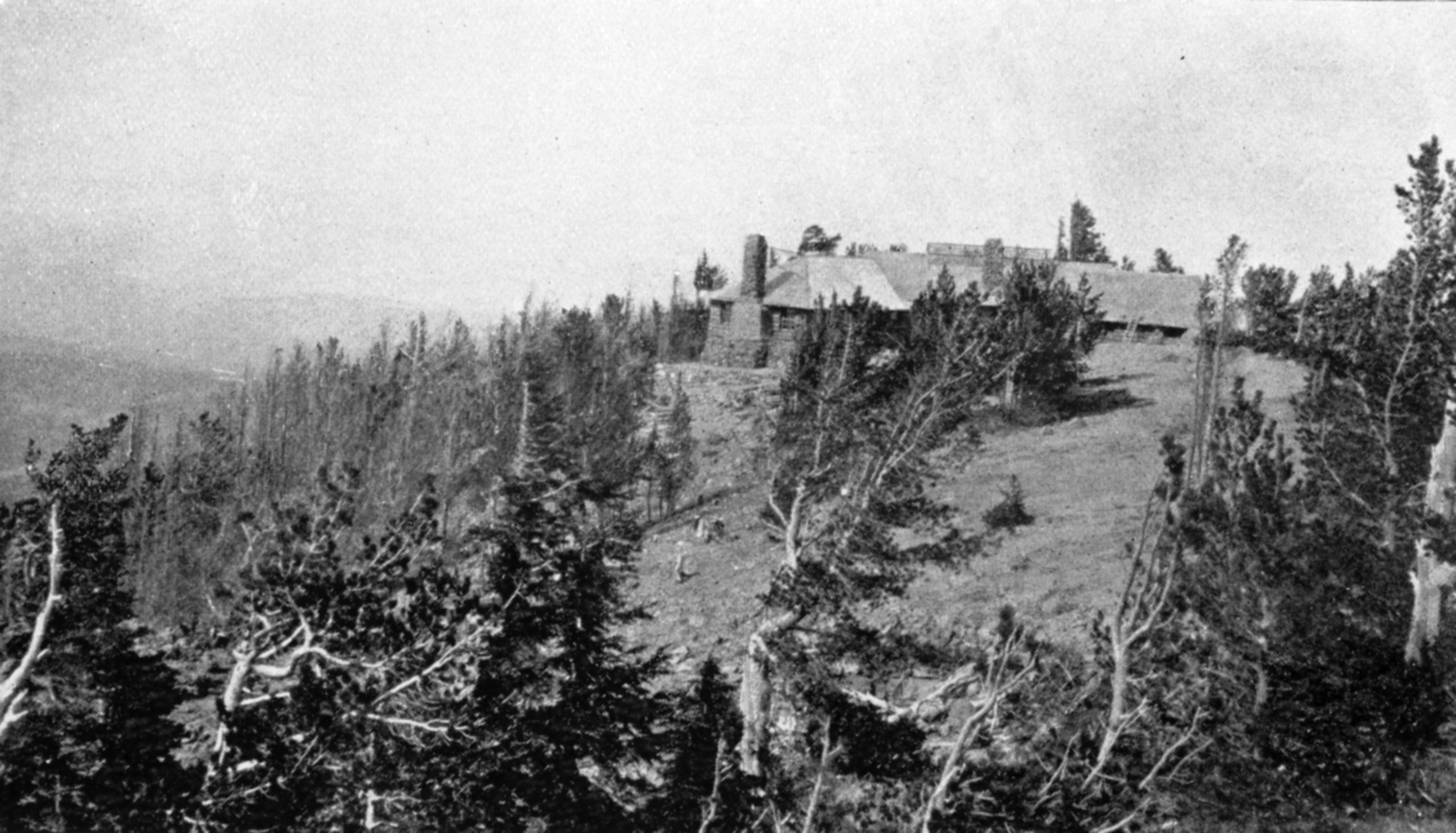
Cloud Cap Inn as depicted in Frances Fuller Victor's Atlantis Arisen (1891).

== See also ==
- National Register of Historic Places listings in Hood River County, Oregon
- Silcox Hut
- Timberline Lodge
