= Summit Pass (Oregon) =

Ski area in Oregon, United States

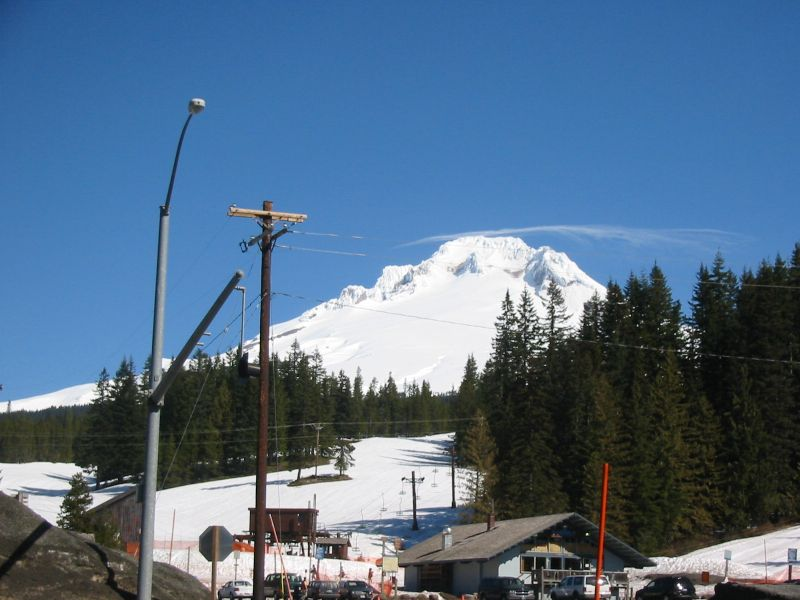
- Summit Pass in winter

- Location in Oregon Summit Pass (the United States)
- Location: Mount Hood, Oregon, US
- Nearest city: Government Camp, Portland (60 miles west)
- Coordinates: 45°18′10.8″N 121°44′49.92″W
- Website: Summit Pass

Summit Pass (formerly Summit Ski Area) is a small ski area located on Mount Hood, alongside the Mount Hood Highway (U.S. Route 26) in Government Camp, Oregon. Built in 1927, it is the oldest ski area in the Pacific Northwest. In addition to downhill skiing and snowboarding, Summit also offers snow tubing and Nordic trails. The resort has a double chairlift, called "Homestead Lift," and a rope tow.

In 2018, R.L.K, and Company, who own Timberline Lodge Ski Area, purchased Summit Ski Area for an undisclosed sum. In 2019, Timberline submitted a master development plan to the U.S. Forest Service, detailing proposed upgrades to the ski area, including a gondola connecting it to Timberline Lodge and an upgraded boundary area and lift. On October 1, 2021, the ski area officially became part of Timberline.

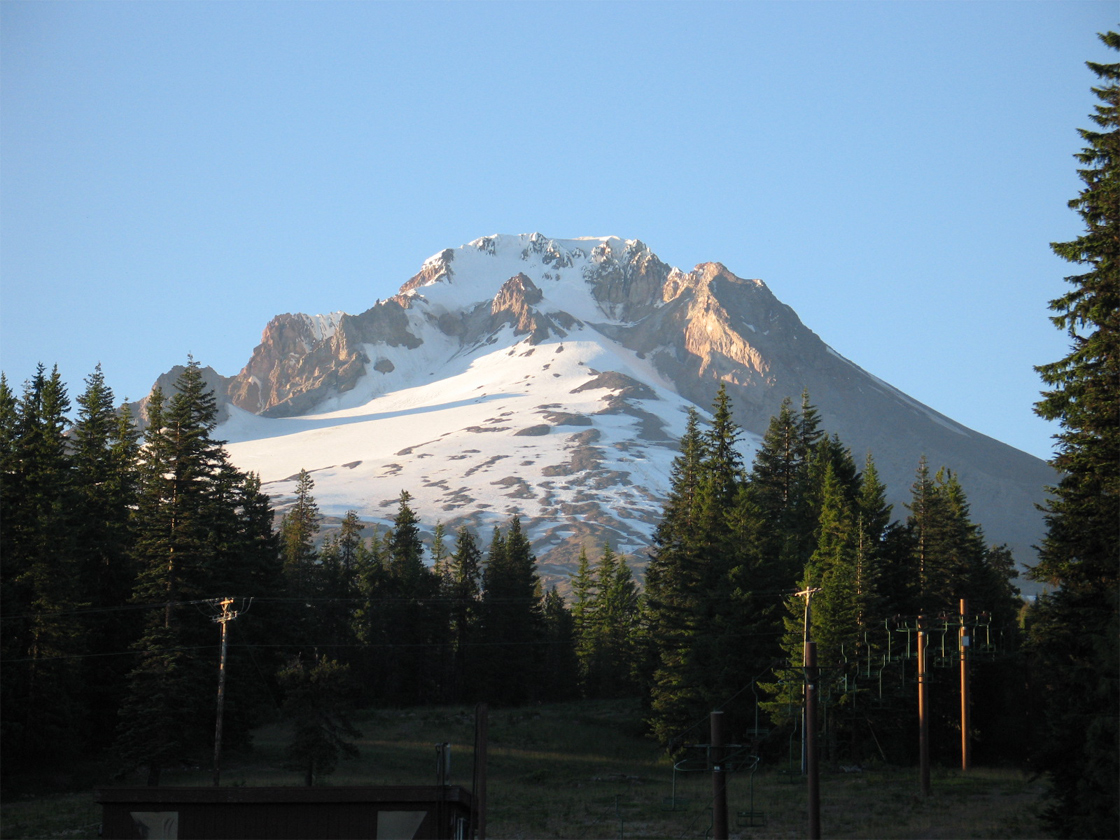
Summit Pass in summer (foreground)
