= Christopher Van Tilburg =

American physician and author

- Crisis on Mount Hood, Stories from 100 Years of Mountain Rescue
- Occupations: Physician; Author
- Awards: Finalist, Nonfiction Narrative, Banff Festival of Mountain Books, 2008; Finalist, Nonfiction Narrative, Oregon Book Awards, 2008; Bill Barry Award, Nonfiction, Far West Ski Association, 2014; Dian Simpkins Award for Service, Wilderness Medical Society, 2011; Humanitarian Research Award, Wilderness Medical Society 2012; Ice Axe Award for Service, Wilderness Medical Society, 2014
- Website: christophervantilburg.com

Christopher Van Tilburg is an American physician and author specializing in emergency, wilderness, travel, environmental, occupational, and public health medicine. He is author of 11 books on outdoor recreation, wilderness medicine, and international travel, including two memoirs on mountain rescue Mountain Rescue Doctor: Wilderness Medicine in the Extremes of Nature and Search and Rescue: A Wilderness Doctor's Life-and-Death Tales of Risk and Reward.

== Early life and education ==
Van Tilburg grew up in Ridgefield, Washington, USA. He earned a BS magna cum laude in Science Communication from University of Portland and an MD from University of Washington School of Medicine. He completed an internship in internal medicine from University of Utah in Salt Lake City and a family medicine residency at Family Medicine of Southwest Washington in Vancouver, Washington. He holds a Certificate of Travel Health and he is a Fellow of the Academy of Wilderness Medicine.

== Career ==
Van Tilburg is on staff at Providence Hood River Memorial Hospital in Hood River, Oregon, USA, where he works at Occupational and Travel Medicine, in the Emergency Department, and at the Providence Mountain Clinic at Mount Hood Meadows Ski Resort. In addition, he works as a physician on expeditions around the world, on cruise ships, on humanitarian medical relief programs, and as an expert witness on wilderness medicine. He is also a mountain rescue doctor with Hood River Crag Rats, the oldest mountain rescue team in the United States, established in 1926 in Hood River, Oregon, USA. He is medical director for four search and rescue teams: Hood River Crag Rats, Pacific Northwest SAR, Clackamas County SAR, and Portland Mountain Rescue. He serves as Public Health Officer in Oregon for Hood River County and North Central Public Health District. He serves as a Medical Examiner for Hood River, Gilliam, Sherman, Wasco, and Wheeler Counties in Oregon.

== Writing ==
Van Tilburg's parallel career of writing began with his first paid job at age 16 as a sports reporter for the Lewis River News. In addition to 11 books and frequent contributions to medical and non-medical publications, he has held multiple editorships including Editor-in-Chief of Wilderness Medicine, Contributing Editor for Columbia Gorge and Gorge Magazine, and as Editor-in-Chief of Travel Medicine News.

== Awards and honors ==
Van Tilburg has been honored three times by the Wilderness Medical Society. He received the Dian Simpkins Award for Service, the Haiti Humanitarian Research Award, and the Ice Axe Award for Service.

His book Mountain Rescue Doctor: Wilderness Medicine in the Extremes of Nature was shortlisted for the Banff Mountain Book Festival and the Oregon Book Awards in 2007 and was Reader's Digest Editor's Pick for November 2007.

His book Adrenaline Junkie's Bucket List: 100 Extreme Adventures to Do Before You Die received the Far West Ski Association Bill Berry Award for outstanding printed media in 2014.

== Published works ==
Van Tilburg is a prolific author whose work spans books, medical papers, adventure travel magazine articles, equipment reviews, book reviews, and blogs. His eleventh book Crisis on Mount Hood: Stories from 100 Years of Mountain Rescue (Mountaineers Books, 2025) chronicles the history of the Hood River Crag Rats, America’s oldest mountain rescue team, and his own three decades in search and rescue. The book examines the mounting pressures on the 11,249-foot peak, where growing crowds, inexperienced climbers, and social media have driven a record number of rescues. It traces the pioneers of mountain rescue, shifts in climbing culture, and the effects of climate change, with particular attention to the volunteers who sustain the work.

=== Books ===
- Backcountry snowboarding. Seattle: The Mountaineers Books, 1998.
- Canyoneering: beginning to advanced techniques. Seattle: The Mountaineers Books, 2000.
- Backcountry Ski Oregon: classic descents for skiers & snowboarders, including southwest Washington. Seattle: Sasquatch Books, 2001.
- Emergency survival: a pocket guide: quick information for outdoor safety. Seattle: The Mountaineers Books, 2001.
- First Aid: A pocket Guide: quick Information for Mountaineering and Backcountry Use. Seattle: The Mountaineers Books, 2001.
- Watersports Safety and Emergency First Aid: A handbook for Boaters, Angles, Kayakers, River Runners, and Surfriders. Guilford, CT: Falcon Press. 2002.
- Introducing your kids to the outdoors. Mechanicsburg, PA: Stackpole Books, 2005.
- Mountain rescue doctor: wilderness medicine in the extremes of nature. New York: St. Martin's Press, 2007.
- Backcountry ski & snowboard routes: Oregon. Seattle: The Mountaineers Books, 2011.
- The adrenaline junkie bucket list: 100 extreme outdoor adventures to do before you die. New York: St. Martin's Press, 2013.
- Search and rescue stories: a wilderness doctor's life-and-death tales of risk and reward. Guilford, CT: Falcon Press, 2017.

=== Medical papers ===
Van Tilburg was the lead author for the Wilderness Medical Society Practice Guidelines for Prevention and Management of Avalanche and Nonavalanche Snow Burial Accidents, a multinational effort published in 2017 and updated in 2024.

== Service ==
Van Tilburg also has a history of volunteering. He served as a member of the board of directors for Wilderness Medical Society from 2000 to 2006. He has made five trips to Haiti for medical relief with Health Corps Haiti. He served as Mountain Rescue Association Medical Committee Chair from 2013 to 2023 and he is a current American delegate to International Commission for Alpine Rescue. He has volunteered as a rescue mountaineer since 2000 for Hood River Crag Rats Mountain Rescue.

== External Websites ==
- Hood River News article about WMS Avalanche Practice Guidelines
- Hood River News Article about Crag Rats Mountain Rescue
- Dr. Van Tilburg's Peer Recognition Awards
- Oregonian story about rescues on Mount Hood
- Outside Magazine articles by Dr. Van Tilburg
