= William Irving Turner =

American architect

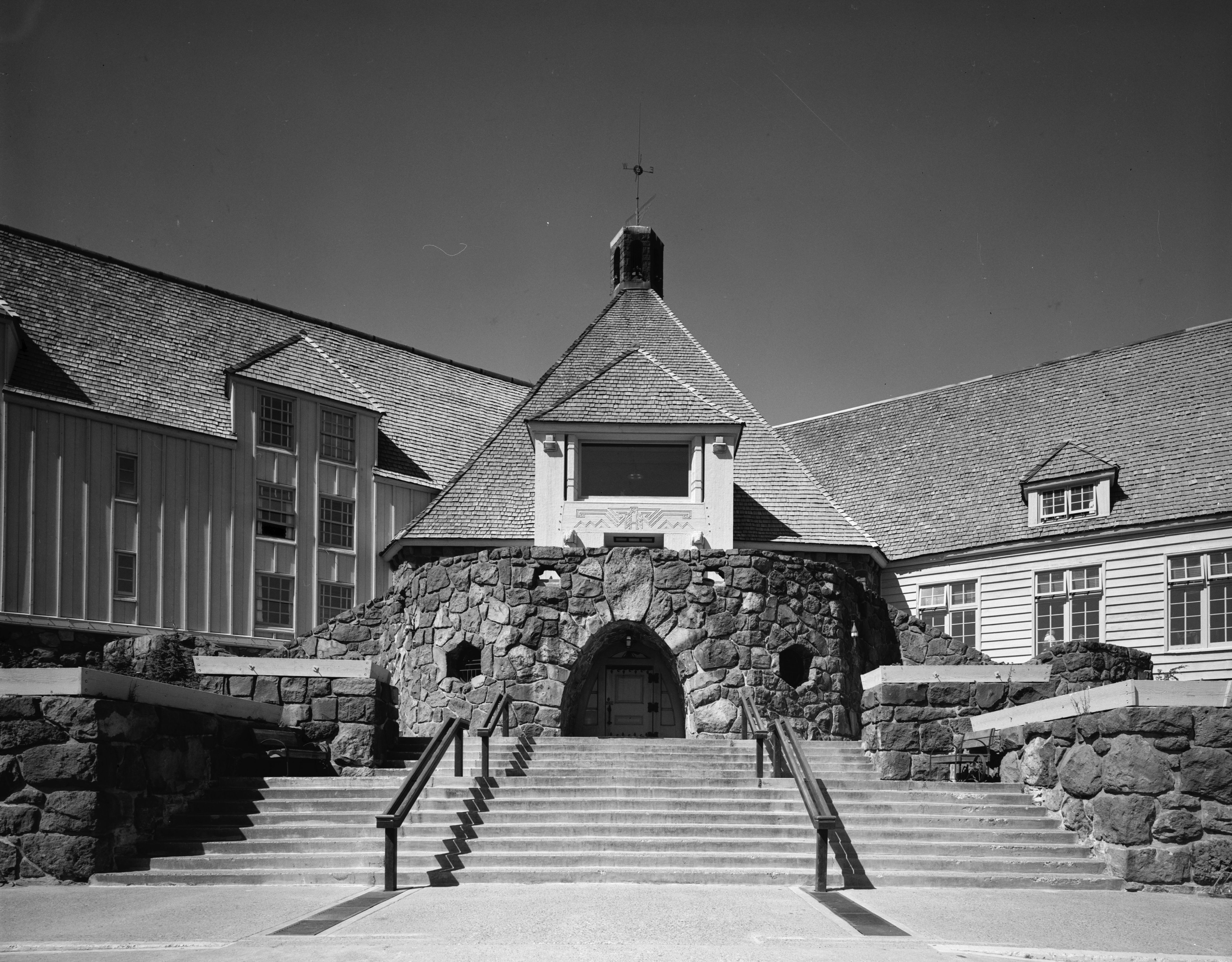
Timberline Lodge in 1994

William Irving Turner (1890–1950), commonly known as Tim Turner or W.I. Turner, was an American architect. He served as a U.S. Forest Service architect and is credited with much of the design of Timberline Lodge on Mount Hood in Oregon, an important and influential work.

He is given individual credit for design of Cascadian Rustic Silcox Hut (alone) and Timberline Lodge (with others as "et al") in their listings in the U.S. National Register of Historic Places. He contributed to many works that are listed on the National Register with attribution to USDA Forest Svce. Architecture Group.

It is believed that Turner's use of Picturesque style in the Timberline Lodge plans was influenced by architect A.E. Doyle's works.

With others he was recognized national Forest Service consulting architect W. Ellis Groben for developing the Cascadian Rustic style.

Earlier in his career he worked for architect Victor W. Voorhies, including on the Vance Building.
