= Hjalmar Hvam =

Norwegian-American Nordic combined skier

Hjalmar Petterson Hvam (16 November 1902 – March 30, 1996) was a competitive Norwegian-American Nordic skier and inventor of the first safety ski binding.

== Early life ==
Hvam was born in Kongsberg, Norway where he excelled at skiing as a youth, winning a ski jumping contest at the age of 12. He emigrated to Canada in 1923 before moving to Portland, Oregon, U.S. in 1927.

== Early career and competition ==
In Oregon, Hvam co-founded the Cascade Ski Club in 1928 and soon established himself as a strong skiing competitor. On April 26, 1931, Hvam and two fellow members of the Cascade Ski Club, Arne Stene and André Roch, became the first to descend on skis from the summit of Mount Hood. In 1932, he won the first U.S. Nordic combined championship held at Lake Tahoe, California, taking first in jumping and cross-country racing.

Though originally a Nordic skier, Hvam soon became a competitive alpine skier as well, winning both runs of his very first slalom race at the 1933 Oregon state championships on borrowed skis. He continued to race competitively throughout the Pacific Northwest in the early 1930s, winning event at Mount Rainier and all four disciplines (ski jumping, cross-country, slalom, and downhill) on Mount Baker in 1936. He qualified for the 1936 U.S. Olympic team, but as a Norwegian citizen, could not compete, and did not want to compete in Hitler's Germany. In 1936, Hvam was the first winner of the nation's oldest ski race, the Golden Rose Ski Classic at Timberline Lodge ski area, and repeated his victory in 1937.

== Saf-Ski bindings ==
Hjalmar Hvam displaying the mini-ski, another of his inventions.

While celebrating his 1937 repeat victory in the Golden Rose, Hvam, like many skiers of his era, broke his leg. Hvam, who had been trained as a mechanical draftsman, had been working for years on a design that would reliably release a ski boot in a fall, but remain in place for normal skiing maneuvers. While laid up in the hospital, he had an inspiration for a new design, which became the Saf-Ski, the world's first ski safety bindings. The bindings made it to Europe for use by the 10th Mountain Division in World War II.

After the war, the design caught on and became popular around the world into the 1960s. Hvam sold and rented thousands of pairs until the early 1970s, when insurance premiums for sale of the bindings became too expensive and the Saf-Ski disappeared from the market.

== Later years ==
Hvam coached the U.S. Nordic combined teams at the 1952 Winter Olympics in his native Norway, where he found he could still outjump the athletes he coached. He continued to operate ski shops in Portland and on Mount Hood until he retired in 1962. He continued to ski recreationally into his mid-80s. He was inducted into the United States National Ski Hall of Fame in 1967, the Oregon Sports Hall of Fame in 1992, and is a member of the Northwest Ski Hall of Fame and the U.S. Ski Business Hall of Fame.

Hvam suffered a heart attack at his Beaverton home and died on March 30, 1996.
