= West Margin Press =

American book publishing company

Graphic Arts Center Publishing Company
- Company type: Private
- Industry: Publishing
- Founded: 1968
- Headquarters: Berkeley, California, USA
- Products: books, calendars
- Parent: Turner Publishing
- Website: https://www.westmarginpress.com/

West Margin Press is a book publishing company.

Using two additional imprints — Graphic Arts Books and Alaska Northwest Books — West Margin publishes books that focused on lifestyle and place.

== History ==
Graphic Arts Center Publishing started in 1967 as a division of Graphic Arts Center, Inc., Oregon's largest printer. The publishing house was one of the pioneers in publishing large-format, full-color print books. These became known as "coffee table books." Their first book in this format was the popular Oregon, a book of photographs by Ray Atkeson, which became a series that includes Oregon 2 and Oregon III.

In the mid 1980s, Graphic Arts began to diversify from photographic books into subjects like children's fiction and non-fiction. In 1993, Graphic Arts acquired Alaska Northwest Books, the largest trade book publisher in the Alaskan market.

In 1998, Graphic Arts started its third imprint, WestWinds Press, to launch a series of Western titles and photography books.

Graphic Arts Center was one of the Northwest's largest book publishers, publishing about 40 books annually and selling over 500 titles to the U.S., Canada, United Kingdom, and Europe.

In April 2006, the company filed for Chapter 11 bankruptcy. In October 2006, Ingram Content Group invested in Graphic Arts as part of a bankruptcy reorganization plan. In January 2007, Graphic Arts Center Publishing Company emerged from bankruptcy. The company again filed for bankruptcy in order to liquidate in November 2009. Ingram became the owner of Graphic Arts.

In 2012, Graphic Arts acquired Pruett Publishing. In 2014, Graphic Arts acquired Companion Press. In 2019, Graphic Arts was renamed West Margin Press, with Graphic Arts remaining as an imprint and the WestWinds Press replaced by West Margin. Turner Publishing acquired West Margin from Ingram in 2022.
