= Ray Atkeson =

American photographer (1907–1990)

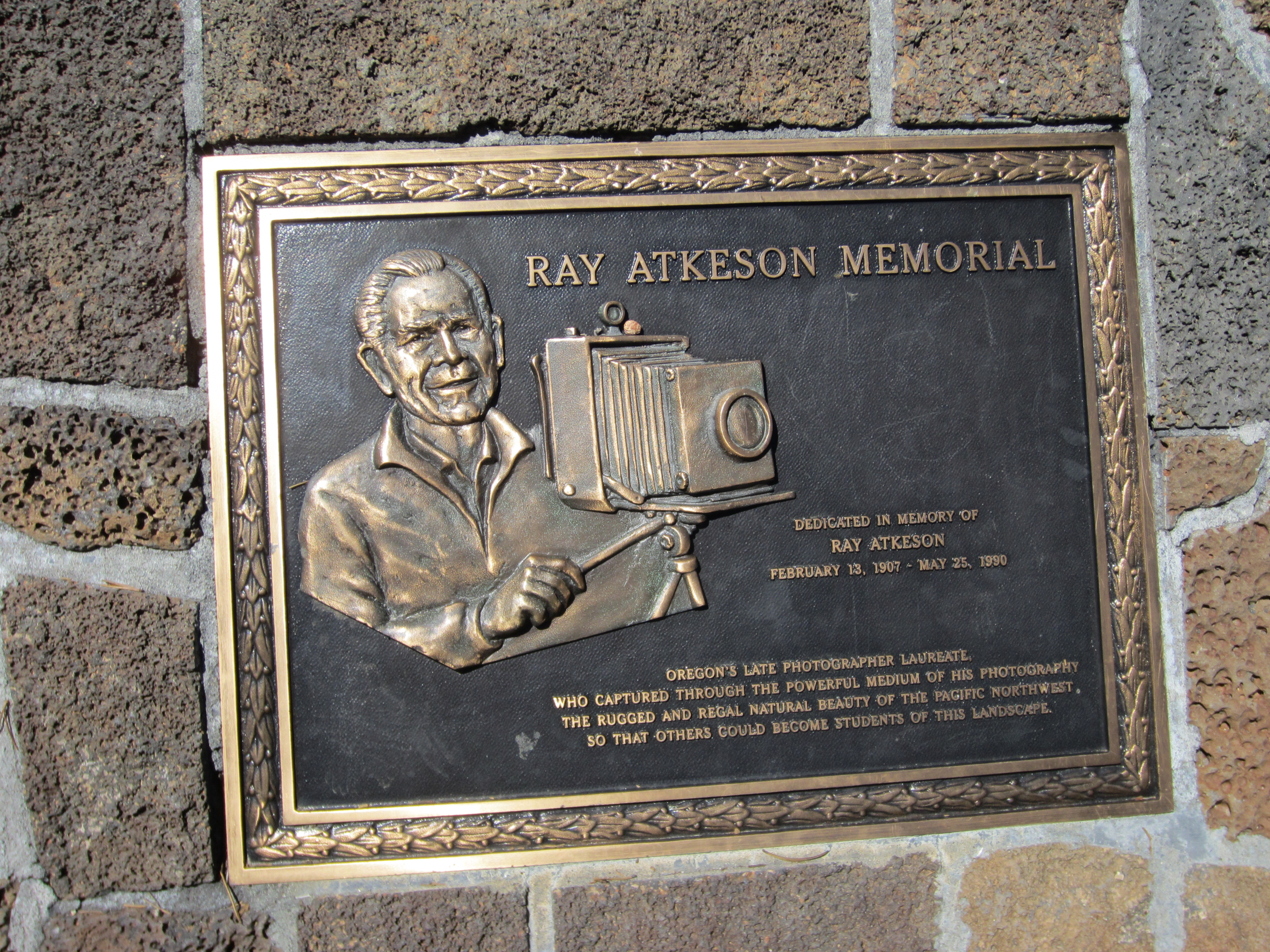
- Memorial at Sparks Lake, Oregon
- Born: Raymond Adelbert Atkeson; February 13, 1907; Grafton, Illinois
- Died: May 25, 1990 (aged 83); Portland, Oregon
- Occupation: Photographer
- Years active: 1928–1987
- Known for: U.S. Northwest landscapes
- Website: www.rayatkeson.com

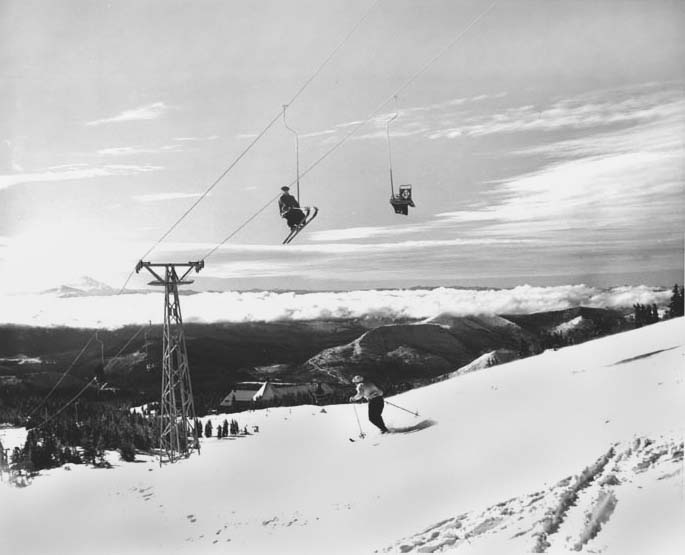
A Ray Atkeson photo of the 1940s Magic Mile chairlift on Mount Hood is preserved in the US Forest Service archives

Ray Atkeson (February 13, 1907 – May 25, 1990) was an American photographer best known for his landscape images, particularly of the American West. His best known photographs are black and white prints, many still popular in galleries, stores, books, traveling art exhibitions, and screensavers.

== Career ==
Ray Atkeson was a commercial photographer in Portland, Oregon for eighteen years 1928–1946 after arriving in Oregon in 1927. His industrial photographs captured activity at the Columbia Steel Casting Company to women building warships for World War II. From 1946 to 1973 he was a free lance photographer and published several photo compilations. The photobooks are mostly of Oregon and Washington, but later work included California.

Atkeson lugged around heavy 4x5 Speed Graphic camera equipment to photograph winter mountain scenes before the chairlift was invented. Among his subjects were Errol Flynn, Yosemite, and many of the Oregon and Washington Cascade mountains. Alan Engen called Atkeson "the finest ski photographer ever." In his later years his granddaughter Karen Schmeer assisted him with his work, including driving him to photo-shoot locations after his eyesight began to fail.

Atkeson maintained two homes: one on the Oregon Coast, the other in Portland.

Atkeson was one of the chief petitioners for the successful Oregon Ballot Measure 7 (1988) which added 500 miles (800 km) to the Oregon Scenic Waterway System.

== Legacy ==
A Ray Atkeson Memorial Trail is marked at Sparks Lake, Oregon.

The Ray Atkeson Photography Collection was donated to the University of Oregon in 2018. It contains over 250,000 negatives which are available to researchers.

His photographs were featured in a 2021–2022 exhibit "Freeze the Day! A History of Winter Sports in Oregon" at the Oregon Historical Society.

== Awards ==
- 1977 Distinguished Citizen of Oregon
- Honorary Doctorate of Fine Arts from Linfield College
- 1986 Oregon Governor's Art Award
- Oregon state Photographer Laureate (1987–1990)

== Books ==
- Ray Atkeson; Merle W. Manly (1933). When winter comes ... West Coast Print. & Binding Co. OCLC 55672937.
- Ray Atkeson (1960). Ski and Snow. New York: U.S. Camera Publishing. OCLC 3297328.
- Ray Atkeson (1968). Oregon. Graphic Arts Center Publishing. ISBN 978-0-912856-00-1.
- Atkeson, Ray (1969). Northwest Heritage: The Cascade Range. Portland, Oregon: Charles H. Belding. ISBN 978-0-912856-01-8.
- Calvin Kentfield (1971). The Pacific Coast. Photos by Ray Atkeson. Rand McNally & Company. ISBN 9780528818707.
- Atkeson, Ray (January 1972). Oregon Coast. Portland, Oregon: Charles H. Belding. ISBN 978-0-912856-06-3.
- Ray Atkeson; Paul M. Lewis (1974). Colorful California. Eugene, Oregon: Beautiful West Pub. Co. OCLC 1505477.
- Archie Satterfield (1974). Oregon II. Photos by Ray Atkeson. Portland, Oregon: Charles H. Belding. ISBN 9780912856155.
- Ross, Richard (June 1987). Oregon III. Photos by Ray Atkeson. Graphic Arts Center Publishing. ISBN 978-0-932575-28-9.
- Ray Atkeson (September 1989). Western Images. Graphic Arts Center Publishing. ISBN 978-1-55868-011-1.
- Ray Atkeson (1998). Oregon, My Oregon. Graphic Arts Center Publishing. ISBN 1-55868-321-6.
- Warren A. Miller (November 2000). Ski and Snow Country: The Golden Years of Skiing in the West, 1930s–1950s. Photos by Ray Atkeson. Graphic Arts Center Publishing. ISBN 978-1-55868-538-3.
- Ray Atkeson (2020). Vintage Skiing: nostalgic images from the golden age of skiing. Familius. ISBN 9781641702768.
