= Timberline Lodge ski area =

Ski area in Oregon, United States

Timberline Lodge

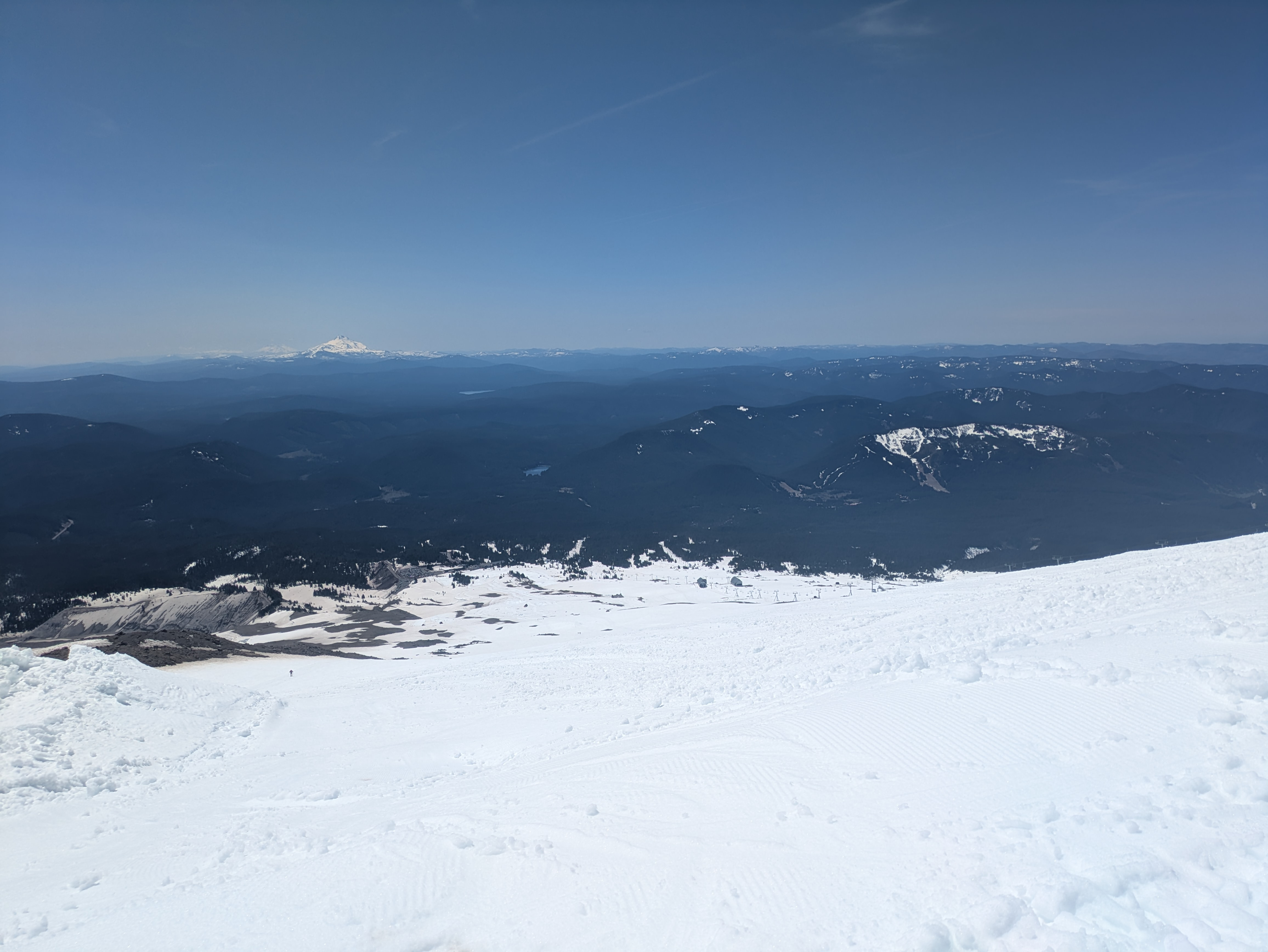
- The ski area viewed from its highest point skier's left of the Palmer lift, with the Timberline base area in the center and Mount Hood Skibowl off to the right

- Location in Oregon Timberline Lodge (the United States)
- Location: Mount Hood, Clackamas County, Oregon, US
- Nearest city: Government Camp 5 miles (8 km) south, Portland 60 miles (100 km) west
- Coordinates: 45.33°N 121.71°W
- Vertical: 4,540 ft (1,384 m)
- Top elevation: 8,540 ft (2,603 m)
- Base elevation: 4,000 ft (1,219 m)
- Skiable area: 1,685 acres (682 ha)
- Trails: 35
- Longest run: 3.12 m (10.2 ft)
- Lift system: 7 chairlifts, 1 rope tow, 1 magic carpet
- Lift capacity: 8,100 persons per hour
- Terrain parks: Yes
- Snowfall: yearly snowfall: 45 ft (14 m) average pack: 15 ft (4.6 m)
- Night skiing: Yes, 3 chairlifts
- Website: Timberline Lodge

Timberline Lodge ski area is the ski and snowboarding area of Timberline Lodge, a National Historic Landmark in the U.S. state of Oregon. It is one of a few ski areas in the United States with most of the skiable terrain below the main lodge. It is located on the south face of Mount Hood, about 60 miles (95 km) east of Portland, accessible via the Mount Hood Scenic Byway.

== History ==
The lodge was constructed between 1936 and 1938 as a Works Progress Administration project during the Great Depression. That year, Timberline opened as Oregon's first destination ski resort with a portable rope tow. The next year, the Magic Mile chairlift opened, as well as Silcox Hut, which sits about one thousand vertical feet (300 m) and a mile (1.6 km) above the main lodge, and was the original unloading and warming hut.

Summer skiing and summer race camps began at Timberline in 1956. Before the Palmer chairlift was constructed in 1983 (which provides access above the 7,000-foot (2,100 m) level), the conditions at Timberline allowed skiing from the Mile from November through July or August. With the Palmer, a skiable surface is available year-round. Timberline is the only ski area in the states with lift accessed skiing and snowboarding all twelve months of the year. Ski and snowboard camps draw thousands of people to the slopes during the months of June, July and August.

=== Early history ===
The Magic Mile chairlift was the longest chairlift in the world, and the second chairlift, of those built to be a chairlift when it opened in 1939. Financial troubles operating the Lodge and World War II closed it for several years during the 1940s and 1950s. The ski area has successfully operated since 1956.

=== Palmer chairlift ===
The original Palmer chairlift opened for 1978 summer ski season on May 8. It was a fixed double chair in basically the same location as the present chair, with the base station near Silcox Hut.

The current Palmer chairlift was completed in 1996, and is built to withstand wind gusts of over 100 miles per hour (160 km/h) and 200 inches (510 cm) of snow. Its construction time was less than six months due to a limited building season imposed by the local weather conditions.

=== Recent history ===
The Jeff Flood Express detachable high speed quad chair opened for the 2007-2008 ski season. With the new lift, Timberline added the Still Creek Basin to skiable terrain on the lower mountain which almost doubles the area below the timberline, which provides much needed capacity on days with wind or limited visibility when the Magic Mile and Palmer are unable to open. Jeff Flood also improves connectivity to Stormin' Normin and Magic Mile lifts from the lower mountain.

Thanks to the added terrain accessible from Jeff Flood, if the Palmer lift is open, it is possible to ski a non-stop run over 3.5 miles (5.6 km) in length with elevation change of about 4,000 feet (1,200 m).

As of 2019, information has been leaked that there will eventually be a gondola that connects Summit Ski Area to Timberline Lodge. Not much is known about this project, except for the fact that it could be completed in the next 10 years.

In 2020, the Pucci chairlift, which used to be a triple fixed-grip lift, was replaced with a quad detachable lift.

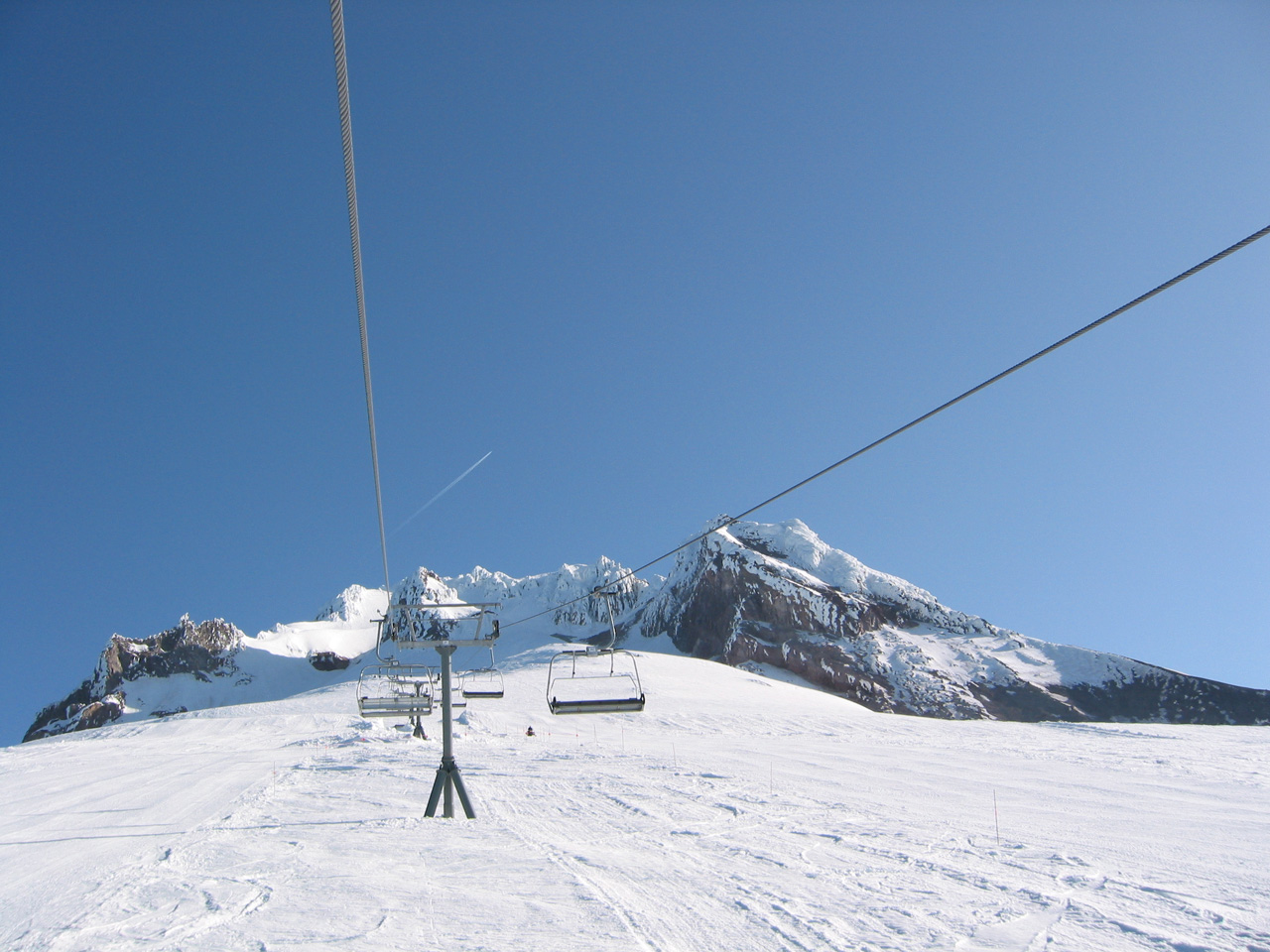
The Palmer chairlift below the summit of Mount Hood

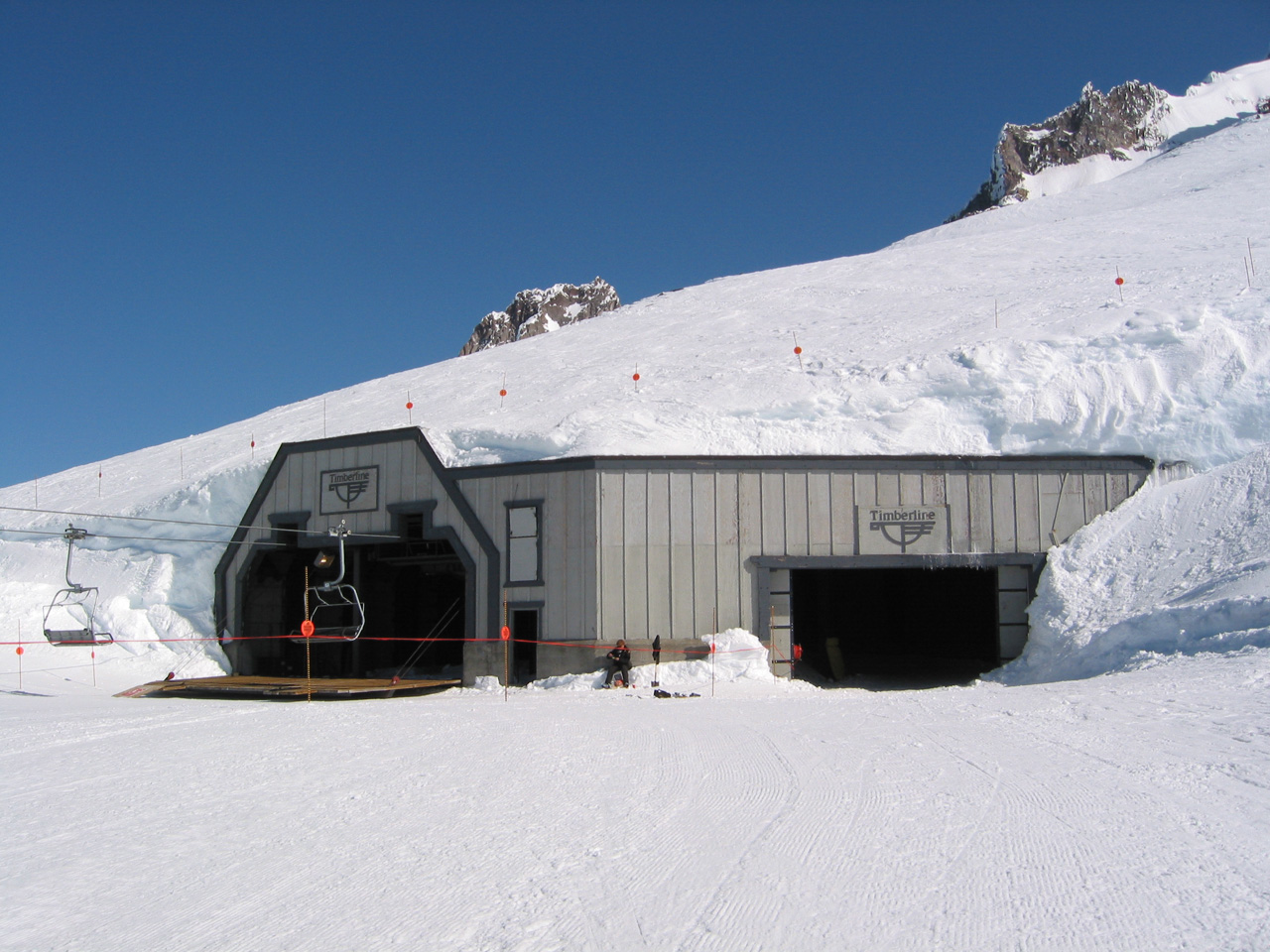
The upper terminal of the Palmer chairlift buried in snow

== Statistics ==
=== Vertical ===
- 4,540' Winter (using chairlifts, Palmer SnowCAT and Resort Shuttle Service)
- 2,166' Winter (only using chairlifts)
- 2,500' early Summer (April - July)
- 1,530' late Summer (July - October)

=== Terrain ===
Timberline categorizes the terrain as beginner 20%, intermediate 50%, advanced 30%. However, the Forest Service published an environmental impact statement containing more detailed information:

Terrain categorization by area and comfortable guest usage based on industry standard terrain density

		Full ski area (Winter)			Upper mountain closed (40% of Winter days)		
Terrain type	Terrain definition slope gradient	Acres	Rider capacity †	Capacity distribution	Acres	Rider capacity †	Capacity distribution
Beginner	8% to 12%	1.4 acres (5,700 m^{2})	42.6	1%	1.4 acres (5,700 m^{2})	42.6	3%
Novice	to 25% (30% short pitches)	37.6	677.2	14%	37.6	677.2	48%
Low Intermediate	to 30% (35% short pitches)	136.8	1,914.8	40%	23.6	329.8	23%
Intermediate	to 40% (45% short pitches)	55.5	555.3	12%	19.0	189.7	13%
Advanced Intermediate	to 50% (55% short pitches)	223.5	1,564.4	33%	24.1	168.6	12%
Expert	over 50%	1.3	3.9	0%	1.3	3.9	0%
Total		456.1	4,758.2	100%	106.9	1,411.8	100%

† Rider capacity is the number of snowboarders and skiers the terrain area comfortably handles, and is not a measure of lift capacity. Page 7 of the reference details the industry standard, which ranges from 2-5 expert skiers per acre up to 25-35 beginners per acre.

=== Lifts ===
- 7 chairlifts, including 6 high speed detachable quads and one bunny slope double
- 1 magic carpet for ski school use

Chairlift detail

Lift Name	Type	Top elevation (ft)	Bottom elevation	Vertical rise	Length (ft)	Slope (%)	Capacity (rides/hr)	Speed (ft/min)	Lift Manufacturer	Year installed
Bruno	fixed double	5,885	5,840	45	368	12%	630	300	Poma	1987
Molly's Express	detach quad	5,835	4,990	845	5,244	16%	1200	1000	Doppelmayr	2000
Pucci	detach quad	5,920	5,350	570	3,398	17%	1800	1000	Doppelmayr	2020
Stormin' Norman	detach quad	6,245	5,460	785	4,396	18%	1500	1000	Doppelmayr	2000
Magic Mile	detach quad	6,990	5,915	1,075	5,359	20%	1600	950	Poma	1992
Palmer Express	detach quad	8,470	6,940	1,530	5,468	29%	1800	1000	Doppelmayr	1996
Jeff Flood Express (Still Creek Basin)	detach quad	6,020	4,850	1,170	6,506	18%	1800	1000	Doppelmayr	2007

== Summer skiing ==
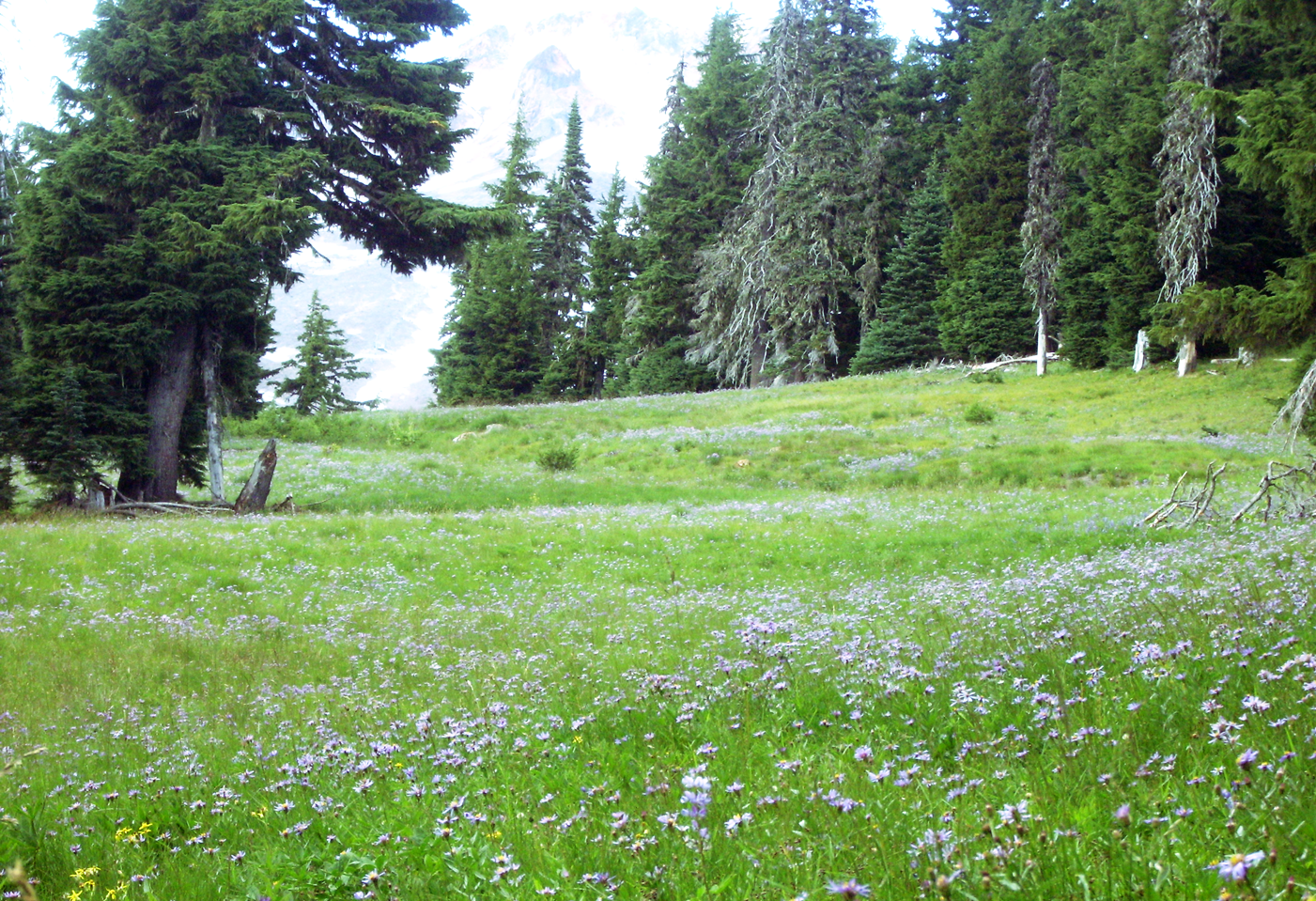
Late summer in the lower ski area brings wildflowers. The upper lifts still have skiable snow.

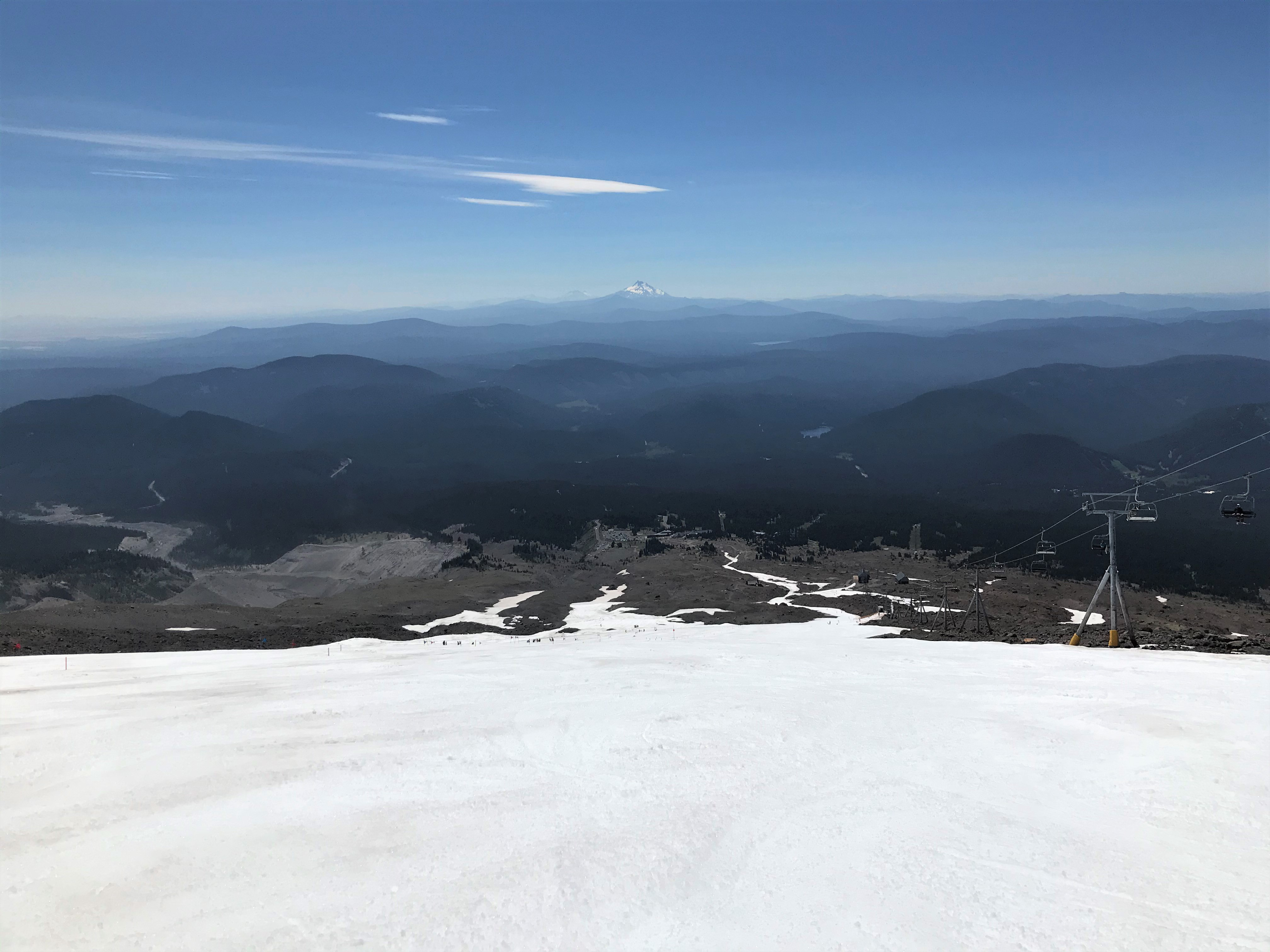
View from top of Magic Mile Ski Run, August 2020

Timberline is one of two ski areas in North America to offer year round skiing, the other one being the indoor ski area Big Snow American Dream in New Jersey. It is scheduled for two weeks closure each September for maintenance. Skiers, snowboarders, and sightseers ride up the Magic Mile chairlift to the Palmer Glacier and its lift, where most of the summer skiing takes place, particularly later in the season. In contrast to winter operations, the lifts are the busiest during the summer ski season Monday through Friday, mostly due to ski and snowboard camps. Besides organized clinics and camps, any intermediate or more advanced member of the public is welcome to ski or snowboard.

Summer ski hours are 7 am to 1:30 pm. During summer ski season, there is no novice or beginner terrain; low-intermediate terrain is available along the Mile. After approximately mid-June, it is necessary to walk at least part of the way to reload the Magic Mile, and feasible to ski to within a few hundred feet of the parking lot until mid-August. On warm days, most skiers leave by late morning due to soft and wet snow conditions. Public skiing is available, but rental gear may be limited. The Palmer lift is limited to skiers and snowboarders only (no foot passengers), with intermediate or greater skills.

=== Summer camps ===
Timberline hosts dozens of summer camps enrolling thousands of athletes throughout the summer: a busy mid-week, mid-season day has as many as 1,500 riders. Virtually every snow sport is offered in camps. Ski racing is the most popular, but snowboard and freeski camps are also popular. Mount Hood Summer Ski Camps have been a mainstay in the summer, hosting campers since the 1970s.

The summer camps are mostly organized as week-long sessions, with on-snow activities in the morning and a variety of other activities in the afternoon, such as river rafting, mountain biking, hiking, trampoline, wind surfing, etc.

=== Events ===
- The Golden Rose Ski Classic is an annual race which began in 1936; World War II called off the event between 1942 and 1945. It is the oldest known organized ski race in America, and is the only USSA-sanctioned summer race. It normally occurs early June as part of the Portland Rose Festival and attracts the world's top skiers. Previous winners include ski safety binding inventor Hjalmar Hvam (1937), 1948 Olympic gold medalist Gretchen Fraser (1938), John Frazer (1950), Howard Hermanson (1952), Christian Pravda (1954), Chris Ditfurth (1956), Ron Hebron (1957, 1961, 1963 and 1965), Kiki Cutter (1968), Steve Mahre (1974), Bill Johnson (1979 and 1981), Mary Mathews (1982), Phil Mahre (1983), Debbie Armstrong (1983), Eva Twardokens (1984), David Lyons (1984), Tamara McKinney, and David Lyons (1985).
- The Masters Summer Fun in the Sun is a ski race held mid-July.

== See also ==
- List of ski areas and resorts in the United States#Oregon
