= Crag Rats =

Oregon mountain rescue team

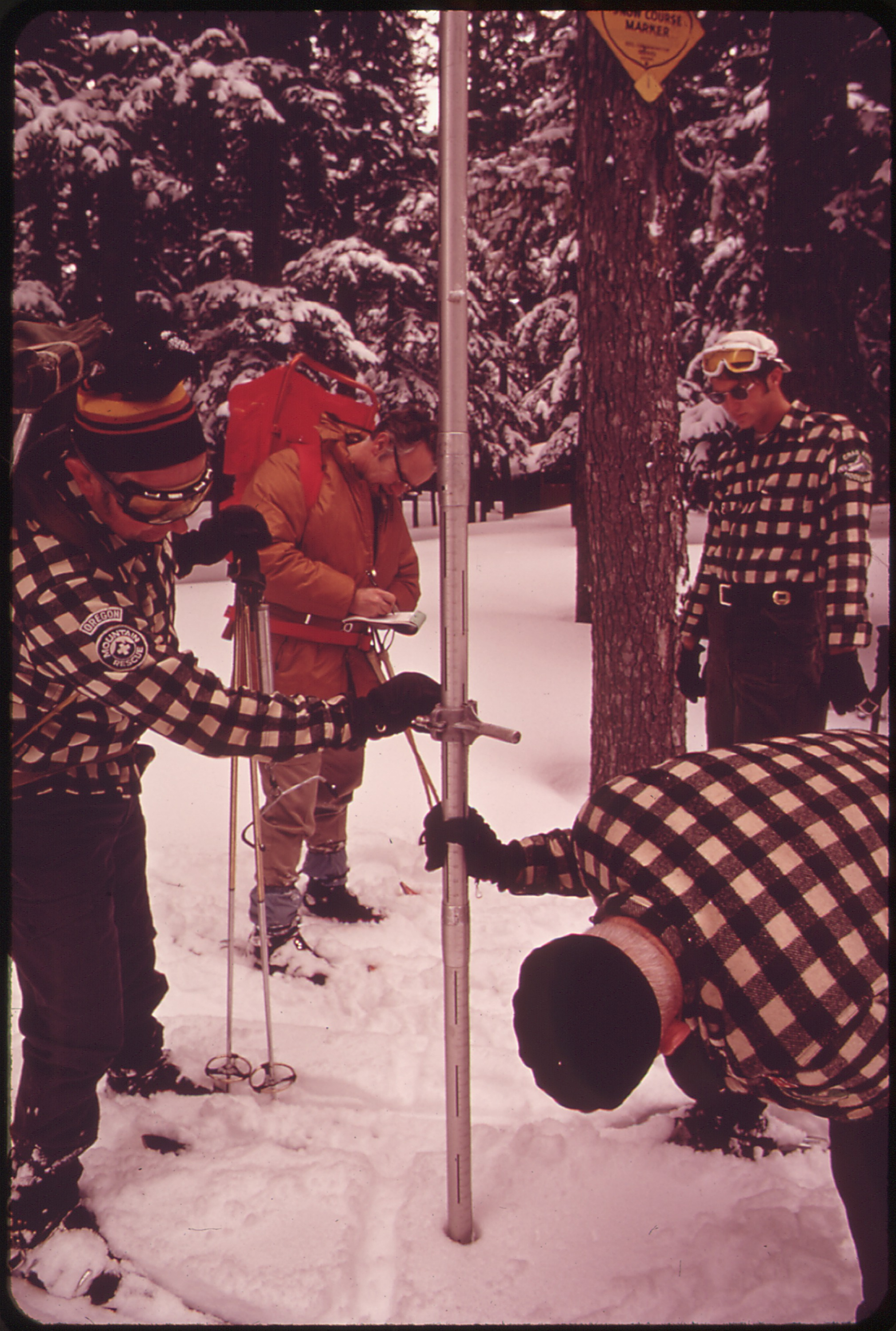
- Crag Rats wearing traditional black-and-white check flannels measure snow levels, 1973
- Founded: 1926
- Founder: A. L. Anderson
- Type: search and rescue
- Location: Hood River, Oregon
- Region served: Mount Hood and Columbia River Gorge

Formed in 1926, the Crag Rats are the oldest volunteer mountain search and rescue organization in the United States. Based in Hood River, Oregon, the Crag Rats are an all-volunteer, nonprofit rescue agency that primarily covers Mount Hood and the Columbia River Gorge.

== History ==
As a charter member of the Mountain Rescue Association, they were founded in 1926 by A.L. Anderson, a lumberman from Hood River, after a search for a missing seven year old on Mt. Hood. Their name originates from a wife of a founding member, who stated that the men spent so much time on the crags of the mountain that they were like "crag rats".

== Operations ==
Working under the direction of local authorities like the Hood River County Sheriff's office, they regularly conduct rescue operations for those lost, stranded, or injured in the popular recreation areas surrounding the Columbia River Gorge National Scenic Area and Mount Hood National Forest. In 2022, they responded to a record 60 days of rescue efforts. Since the 1950s, the club has maintained Cloud Cap Inn on the mountain as a base.
