= Magic Mile =

Aerial chairlift in Oregon, United States

Coordinates: 45.33103°N 121.71358°W

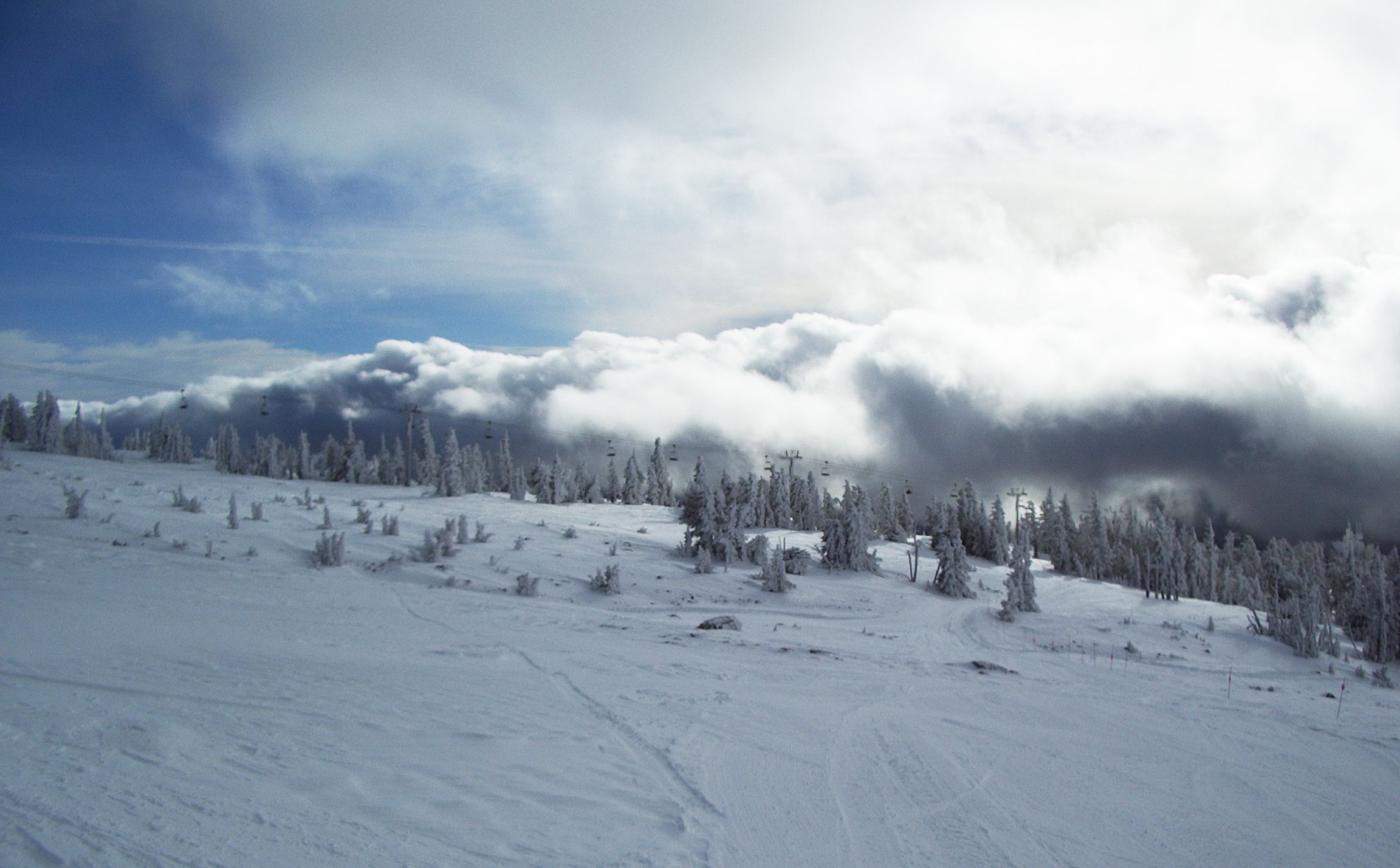
The present-day Magic Mile chairlift rises out of the clouds and above the tree line

The Magic Mile

The Magic Mile is an aerial chairlift at Timberline Lodge ski area, Mount Hood, Oregon, U.S. It was named for its unique location above the tree line and for its original length. When constructed by Byron Riblet in 1938, it was the longest chairlift in existence, the second in the world to be built as a passenger chairlift, and the first to use metal towers.

The chairlift has been replaced twice, in 1962 and 1992.

Like its predecessors, the current chairlift loads near the lodge at 5,950 feet (1829 m) and unloads at 7,000 foot (2134 m), up an average gradient of 20%. Except for the very lowest part of the route, the lift is not protected by trees or land features and faces the full force of snow storms. Heavy winds frequently produce huge snowdrifts and copious and dense snow challenge lift crews to keep the lift open. The lift is generally closed when winds exceed 50–60 miles per hour (80–97 km/h) or dense fog reduces visibility below about 25 feet (7.6 m) — in all, about 40% of winter days.

== First chairlift, 1938–1962 ==
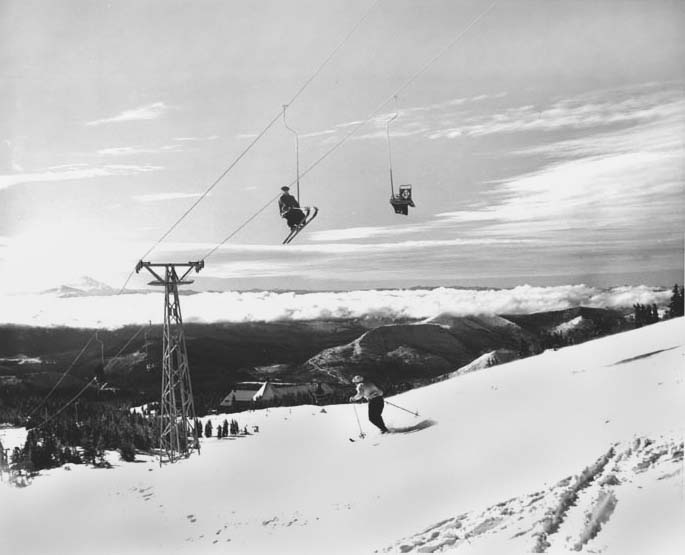
1940s image of the Magic Mile just above Timberline Lodge (center) taken by Ray Atkeson

Construction of the original Magic Mile began in mid-1938, a few months after Timberline Lodge opened for business with a portable rope tow. (The tow remained in operation for at least several years.) The chairlift was the first built by the Riblet company, which drew heavily on its designs for aerial trams for mining companies.

Completed in late 1939, it loaded its first passengers on November 17, 1939, and was dedicated by the Crown Prince and Princess of Norway (later King Olaf).

The original chairlift was a single — each chair held one rider. The ride took 11 minutes and carried 225 passengers per hour. It was as popular a summer tourist attraction then as it is now.

The lift line was slightly east of the present chair. The upper bullwheel was inside Silcox Hut, which is 212 m (700 ft) ESE and 40 ft (12 m) lower in elevation. The bottom was east of the lodge about 377 m (1236 ft, one quarter mile) ENE at essentially the same elevation as the present chair.

Timberline Lodge shut down for World War II and struggled financially through the 1940s and early 1950s. Mounting disrepair, vandalism, neglect and unpaid taxes closed it February 17, 1955, at which time the Magic Mile was nonfunctional. The lodge reopened late that year under the management of Richard Kohnstamm, whose family still manages the resort. The Mile was made functional again, and in the following summer, ski racing camps began.

== 1950 Sky Riding Bus Tramway ==
In 1950, a cable car system began operation between 3,800 feet (1,200 m) and the Timberline Lodge at 6,000 feet (1,800 m), a 3-mile (4.8 km) trip that took 10 minutes. Each 36-person "bus" pulled itself up the mountain along the cable.

== Second chairlift, 1962–1992 ==
By 1962, the Magic Mile had long been a challenge to maintain, so the Timberline's operator replaced it with a double Riblet lift. The new lift had a midway station for loading and unloading, which allowed the lower mountain to remain open when harsh winter weather closed the upper mountain, and the upper mountain to remain open for mid-to-late summer skiing when little snow remained on the lower mountain.

The full ride up this second Magic Mile ride took about the same time as the original, 10 to 12 minutes, but tighter chair spacing and two riders per chair increased the capacity about 800 to 1,000 per hour.

The bottom of the Mile was placed at the west side of the lodge for easy access, and for skier convenience from the top of the Pucci chairlift, which was installed in 1956.

The Palmer chairlift, which opened July 1, 1980, was situated for convenient skier and snowboard transport from the top of the Mile. The Palmer was upgraded to a high-speed quad in 1996.

== Third chairlift, 1992–present ==
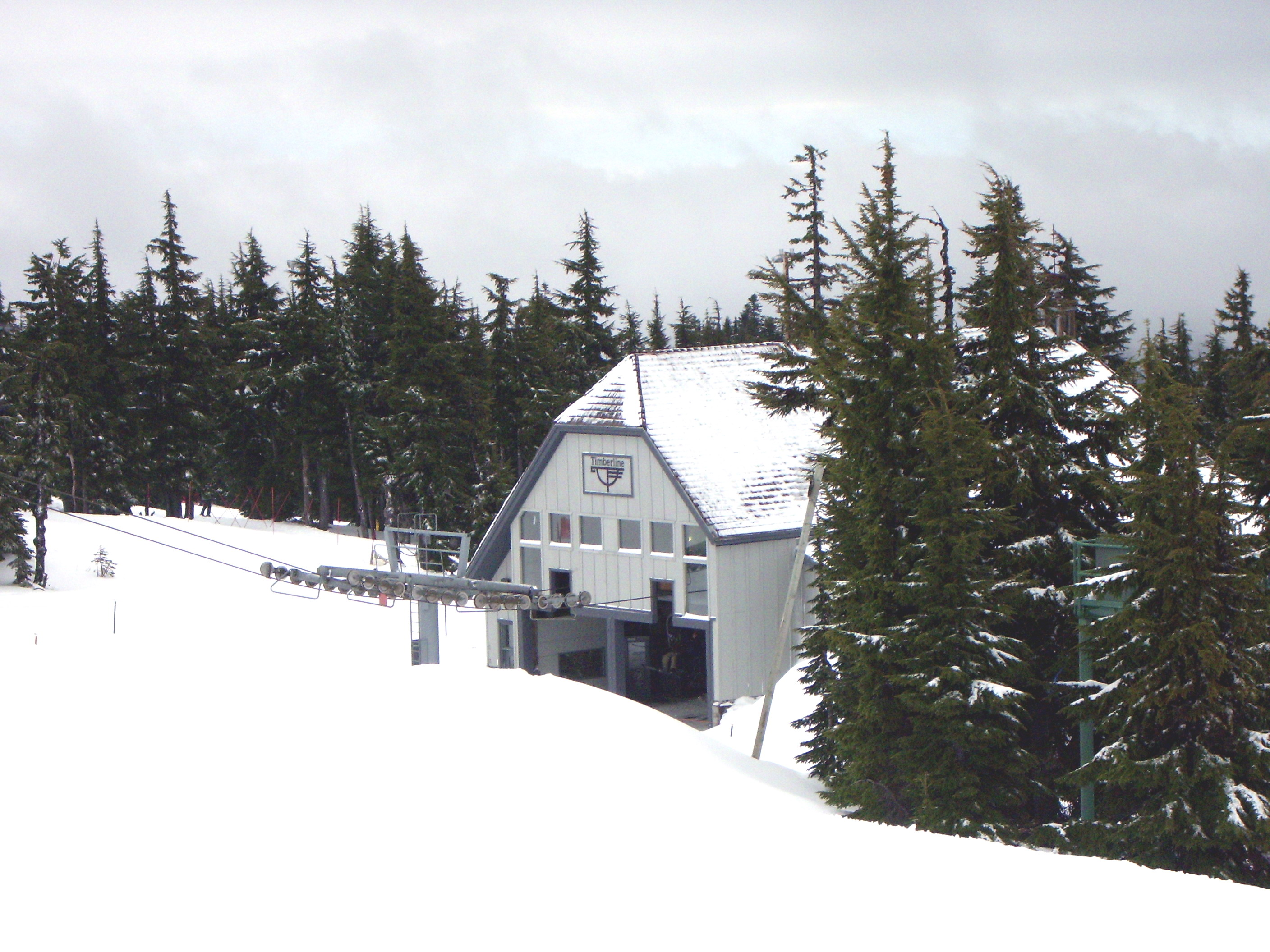
The Magic Mile's lower terminal sits just below the tree line.

In 1992, the Magic Mile chairlift was upgraded from a fixed grip double to a detachable high speed quad. The midway station was removed, and a new top station built slightly higher than its predecessor, lengthening its run to 5,500 feet (1,700 m).

This Poma-built chair can move 3,000 passengers per hour, but is operated at 1,600 passengers per hour, with a ride time of just under 6 minutes.

The use of a detachable chairlift reduces maintenance needed to clear the haul rope. When bad weather is expected, the chairs are removed and stored in the lower lift house. The rope runs at low speed to prevent the buildup of snow and ice. The chairs are redeployed in an automatic operation which takes about 30 minutes.

== See also ==
- Sun Valley, Idaho: First destination ski resort and first chairlift (1936)
