= Silcox Hut =

- U.S. National Register of Historic Places
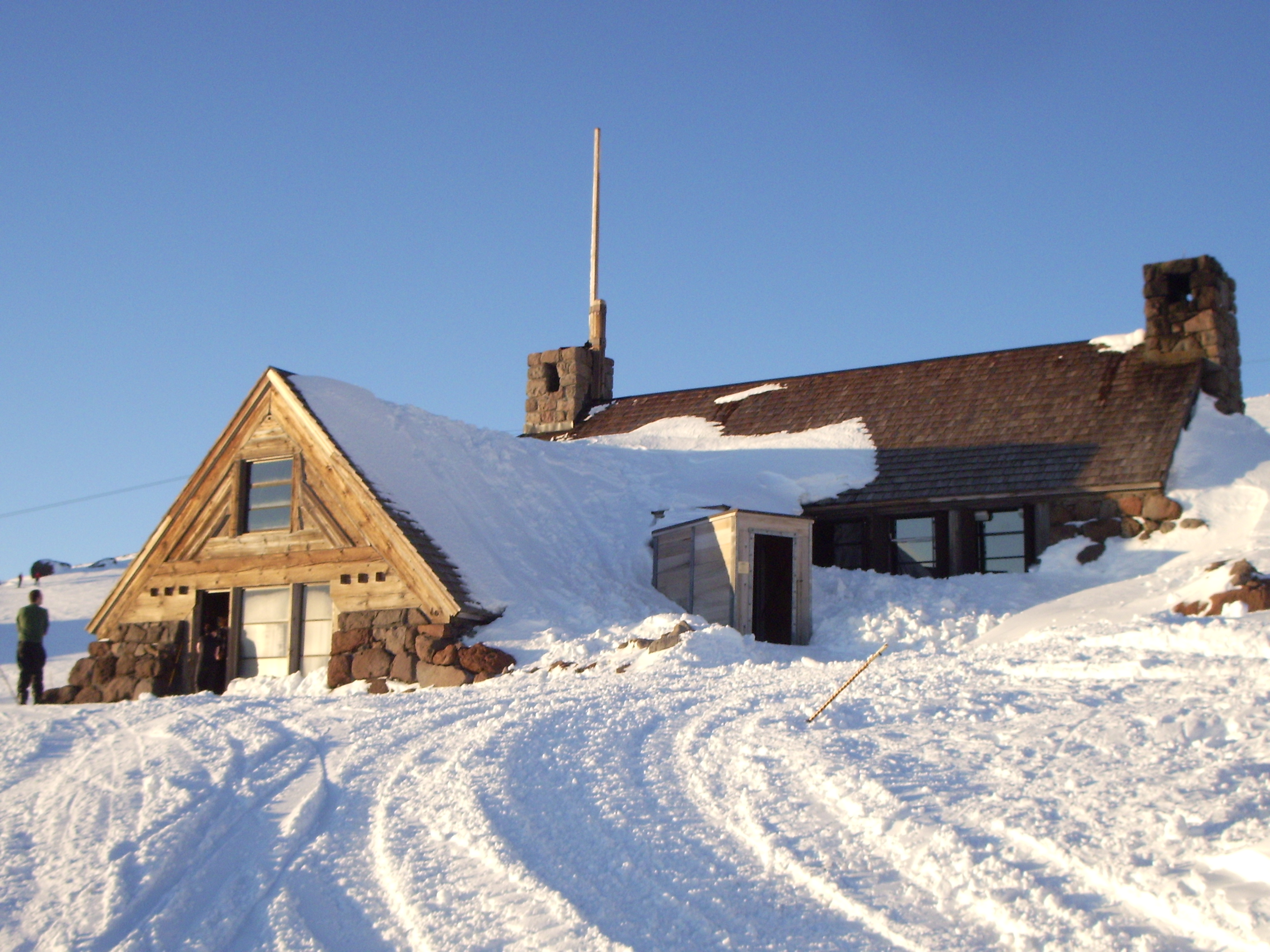
- A low winter snow pack reveals the sleeping area window. The entrance is through the wooden tunnel at center.
- Location: Mount Hood, Oregon, U.S.
- Coordinates: 45.344562°N 121.709521°W
- Built: 1939
- NRHP reference No.: 85000144
- Added to NRHP: 1985

The Silcox Hut is a small rustic mid-mountain lodge located at 6,950 feet (2,120 m) elevation on Mount Hood, Oregon, United States. It is approximately 1,000 feet (300 m) vertical above Timberline Lodge and roughly one mile distance directly up the mountain.

Silcox Hut was built by the WPA and finished in 1939. It was named after Ferdinand Silcox, the fifth Chief of the Forest Service, 1933–1939. The hut was the upper terminal of the original Magic Mile chairlift and housed the lift's upper bullwheel in what is now the guest sleeping quarters. It was also intended as a warming hut and starting point for climbers. After the chairlift was relocated in 1962, it was abandoned and became derelict due to vandalism and fierce mountain weather.

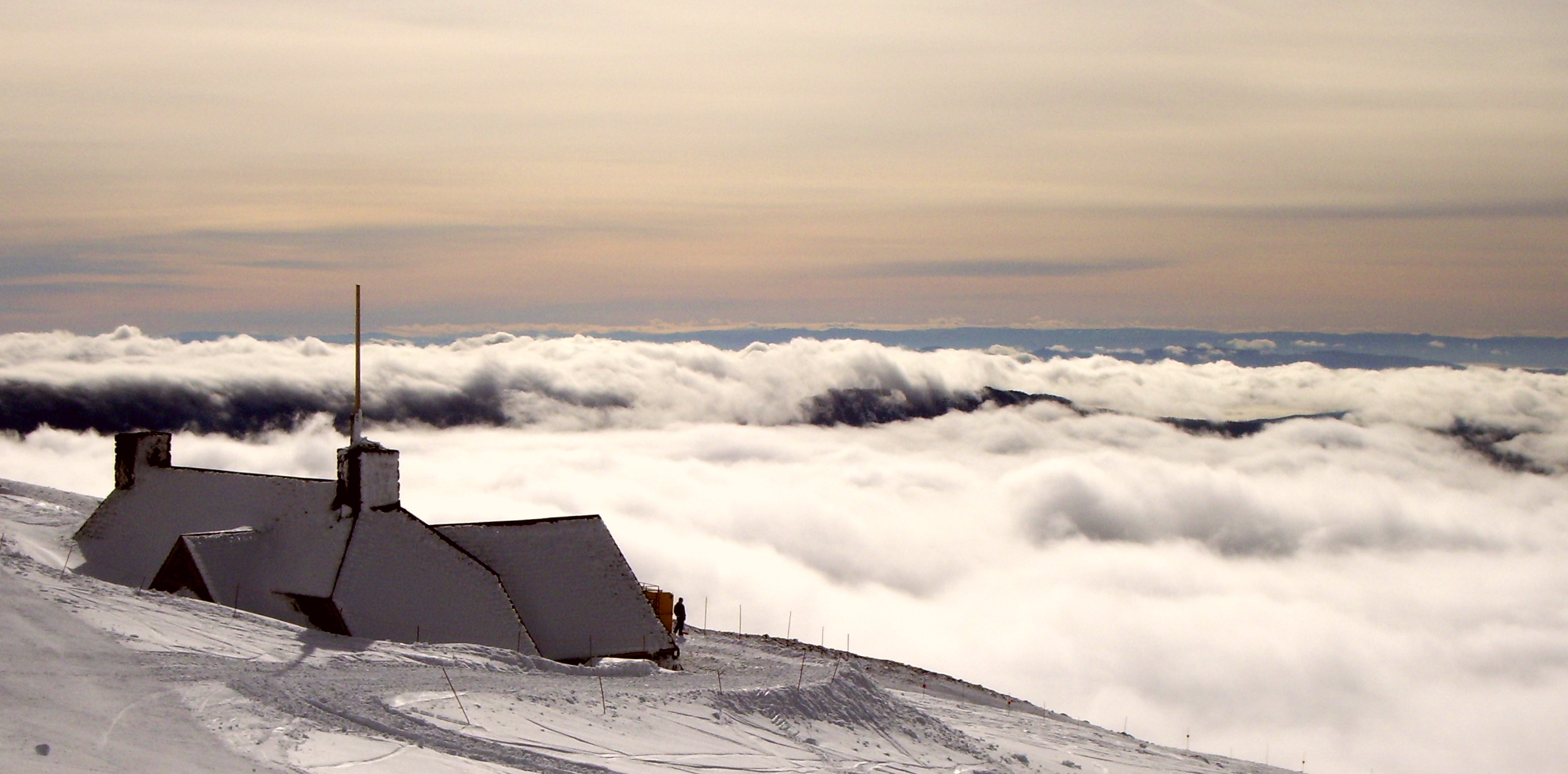
Vista from Silcox above cloud-covered central Oregon

In 1966, the Portland State University Outdoor Program leased the Hut. The students of the Program made a few improvements to the hut including repairs to the fireplace hearth and new window shutters. Program Alumni consider this lease the first action taken to save Silcox Hut. There was discussion between the US Forest Service and Timberline Lodge to burn down the hut because of its condition. Even though the Program enjoyed access to the mountain provided by Silcox Hut, they could not counter the seemingly constant vandalism and had to relinquish the lease.

Silcox Hut was added to the National Register of Historic Places in 1985. In the same year, the Friends of Silcox Hut was created as a non-profit organization. The initial restoration proposal was made by climbing enthusiasts and guides, and it was their intention to operate the facility.

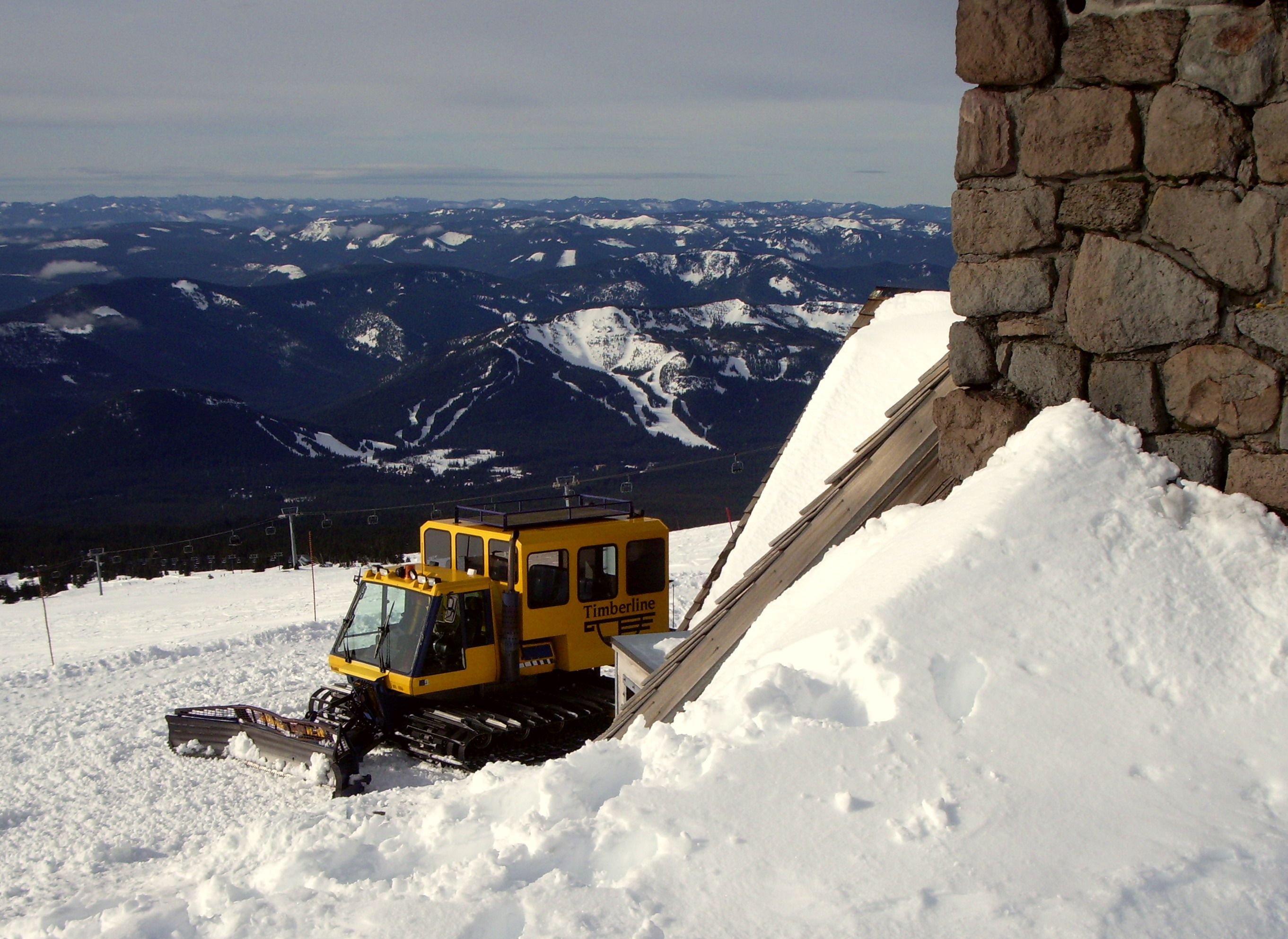
Snowcat transports overnight guests. Skibowl and much of the Cascade Range is visible

Over the course of the late 1980s and early 1990s, The Friends of Silcox Hut renovated and reopened Silcox to the public in 1993. Although they intended it partially as an overnight hostel and restaurant for climbers, it is now rented out to groups of up to 24 for overnight lodging and hearty meals by RLK, the operators of Timberline Lodge. It is available for group day use such as weddings and anniversaries.

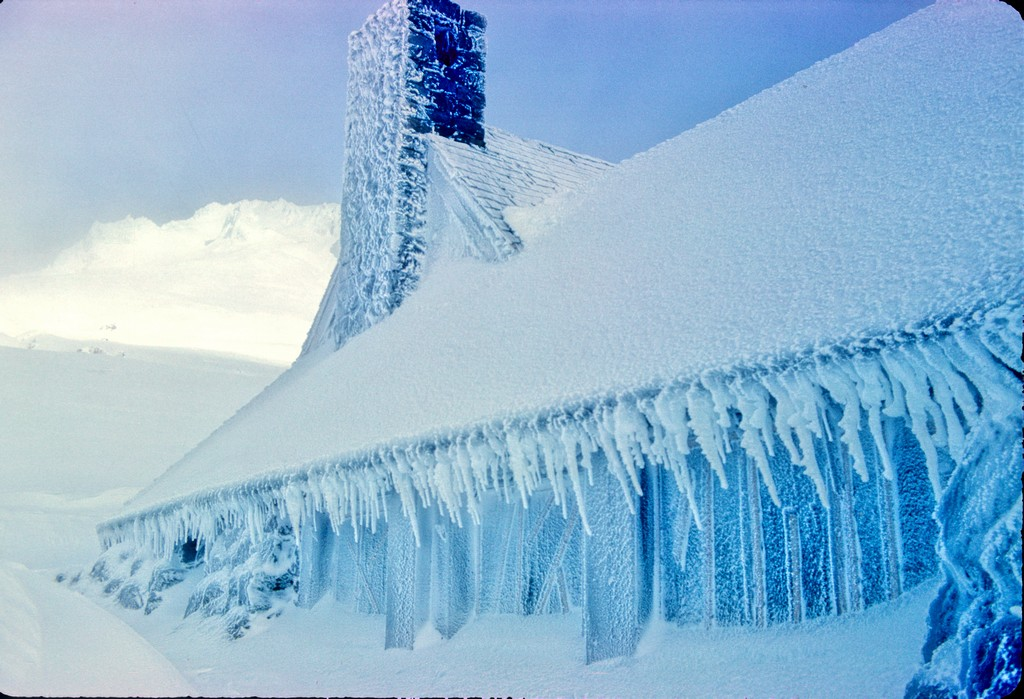
Silcox Hut, Thanksgiving, 1966

The Friends of Silcox received several awards for its restoration, including the People's Choice Award and the Craftsmanship Award from the Portland AIA Awards Program in 1993.

The Friends of Silcox Hut carries on as a non-profit maintenance and special projects group to protect the integrity of the restoration. Its board is entirely made up of architects and craftsmen and others deeply involved in the original restoration. Lifetime and annual memberships are available with all proceeds supporting restoration efforts.

Recent special projects included a snow tunnel for the south entrance engineered to withstand 25 feet of compacted snow.

== Climate ==
Climate data for Silcox Hut 45.3452 N, 121.7097 W, Elevation: 6,950 ft (2,120 m) (1991–2020 normals)
Month	Jan	Feb	Mar	Apr	May	Jun	Jul	Aug	Sep	Oct	Nov	Dec	Year
Mean daily maximum °F (°C)	31.2 (−0.4)	31.3 (−0.4)	33.3 (0.7)	36.5 (2.5)	44.8 (7.1)	51.1 (10.6)	61.9 (16.6)	62.4 (16.9)	56.4 (13.6)	44.9 (7.2)	34.9 (1.6)	29.9 (−1.2)	43.2 (6.2)
Daily mean °F (°C)	25.9 (−3.4)	25.0 (−3.9)	26.0 (−3.3)	28.7 (−1.8)	36.0 (2.2)	41.8 (5.4)	51.2 (10.7)	51.8 (11.0)	46.7 (8.2)	37.3 (2.9)	29.3 (−1.5)	24.8 (−4.0)	35.4 (1.9)
Mean daily minimum °F (°C)	20.6 (−6.3)	18.6 (−7.4)	18.8 (−7.3)	20.9 (−6.2)	27.2 (−2.7)	32.5 (0.3)	40.5 (4.7)	41.2 (5.1)	37.1 (2.8)	29.7 (−1.3)	23.7 (−4.6)	19.7 (−6.8)	27.5 (−2.5)
Average precipitation inches (mm)	17.74 (451)	13.37 (340)	14.01 (356)	11.13 (283)	7.20 (183)	5.87 (149)	1.36 (35)	1.99 (51)	4.64 (118)	10.36 (263)	17.46 (443)	17.58 (447)	122.71 (3,119)
Source: PRISM Climate Group
