= Timberline Lodge =

Hotel in Mount Hood, Oregon

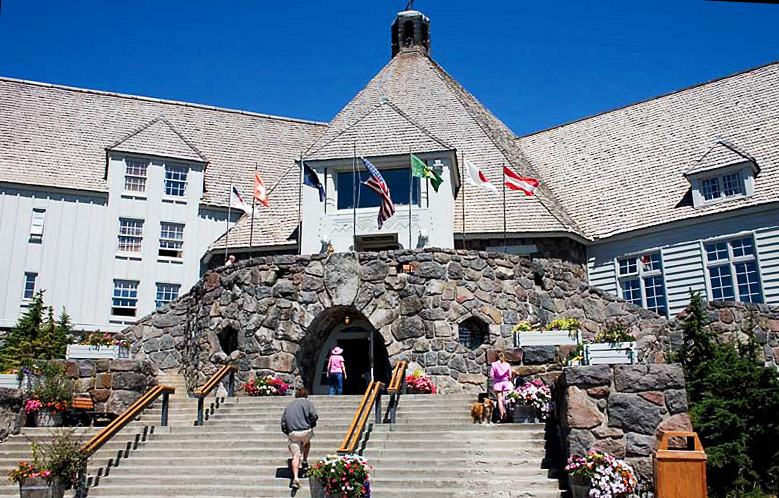
- Timberline Lodge in Summer 2006
- Interactive map of the Timberline Lodge area

General information
- Architectural style: Rustic Cascadian Neovernacular
- Location: Mount Hood, Clackamas County, Oregon
- Coordinates: 45°19′52″N 121°42′36″W
- Year built: 1936–1938
- Owner: U.S. Forest Service

Design and construction
- Architects: Gilbert Stanley Underwood; W. I. Turner; Linn A. Forrest

U.S. National Historic Landmark
- Designated: December 22, 1977

U.S. National Register of Historic Places
- Designated: November 12, 1973
- Reference no.: 73001572

Timberline Lodge is a mountain lodge on the south side of Mount Hood in Clackamas County, Oregon, United States, about 60 miles (97 km) east of Portland. Constructed from 1936 to 1938 by the Works Progress Administration, it was built and furnished by local artisans during the Great Depression. Timberline Lodge was dedicated September 28, 1937, by President Franklin D. Roosevelt.

The National Historic Landmark sits at an elevation of 6,000 feet (1,829 m), within the Mount Hood National Forest and is accessible through the Mount Hood Scenic Byway. Publicly owned and privately operated, Timberline Lodge is a popular tourist attraction that draws two million visitors annually. It is notable in film for serving as the exterior of the Overlook Hotel in The Shining (1980).

The lodge and its grounds host a ski resort, also known as Timberline Lodge. It has the longest skiing season in the U.S., and is open for skiers and snowboarders all 12 months of the year. Activities include skiing, snowboarding, snowshoeing, hiking, biking, and climbing.

== Design and construction ==
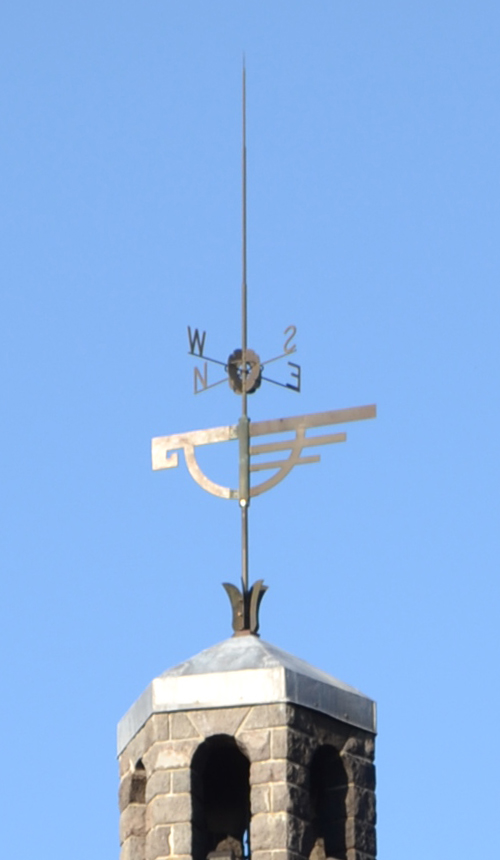
Bronze "snow goose" weather vane above the head house

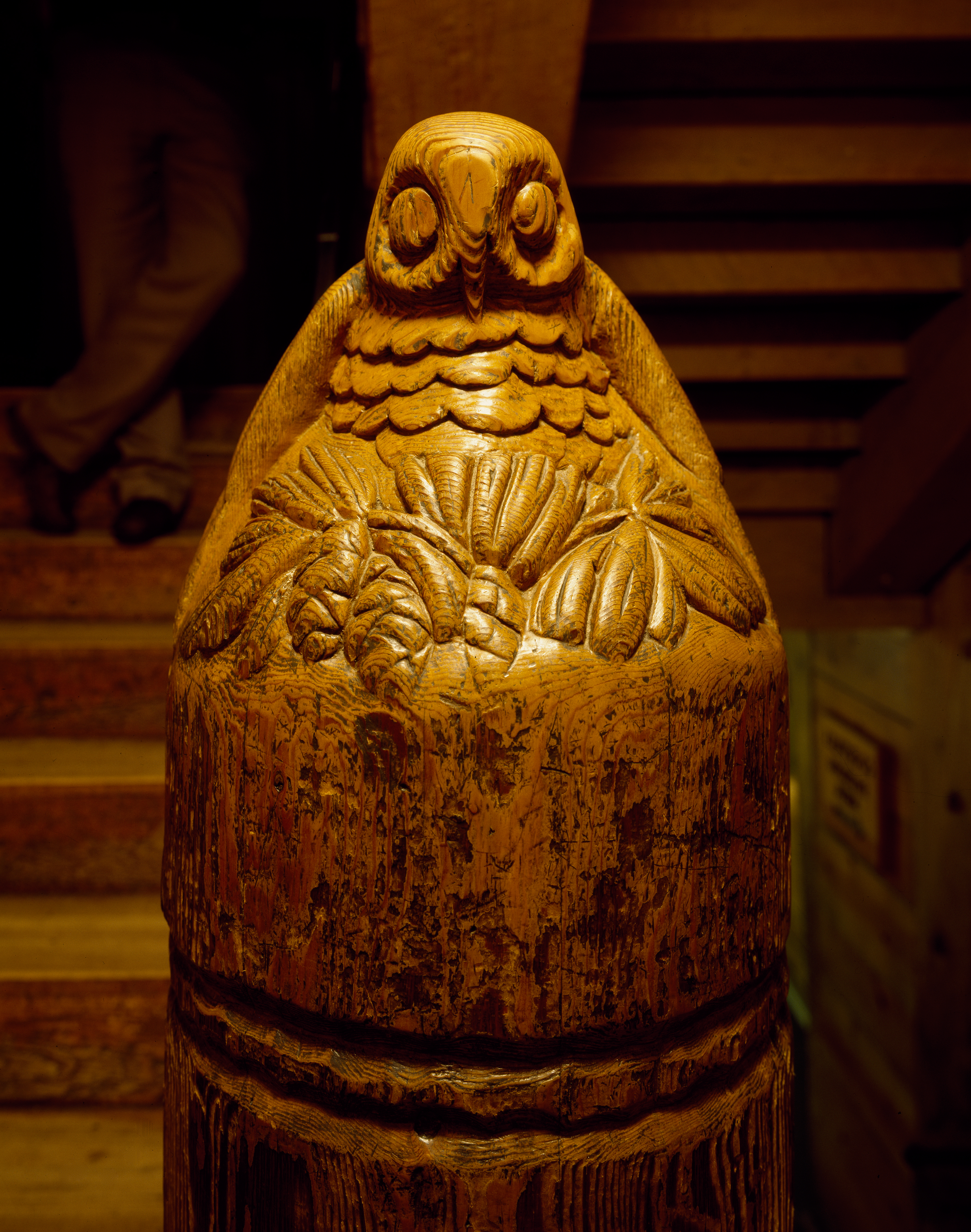
Purchased for $2.10 each, discarded cedar utility poles were repurposed as newel posts—19 of them crowned with carvings of area wildlife.

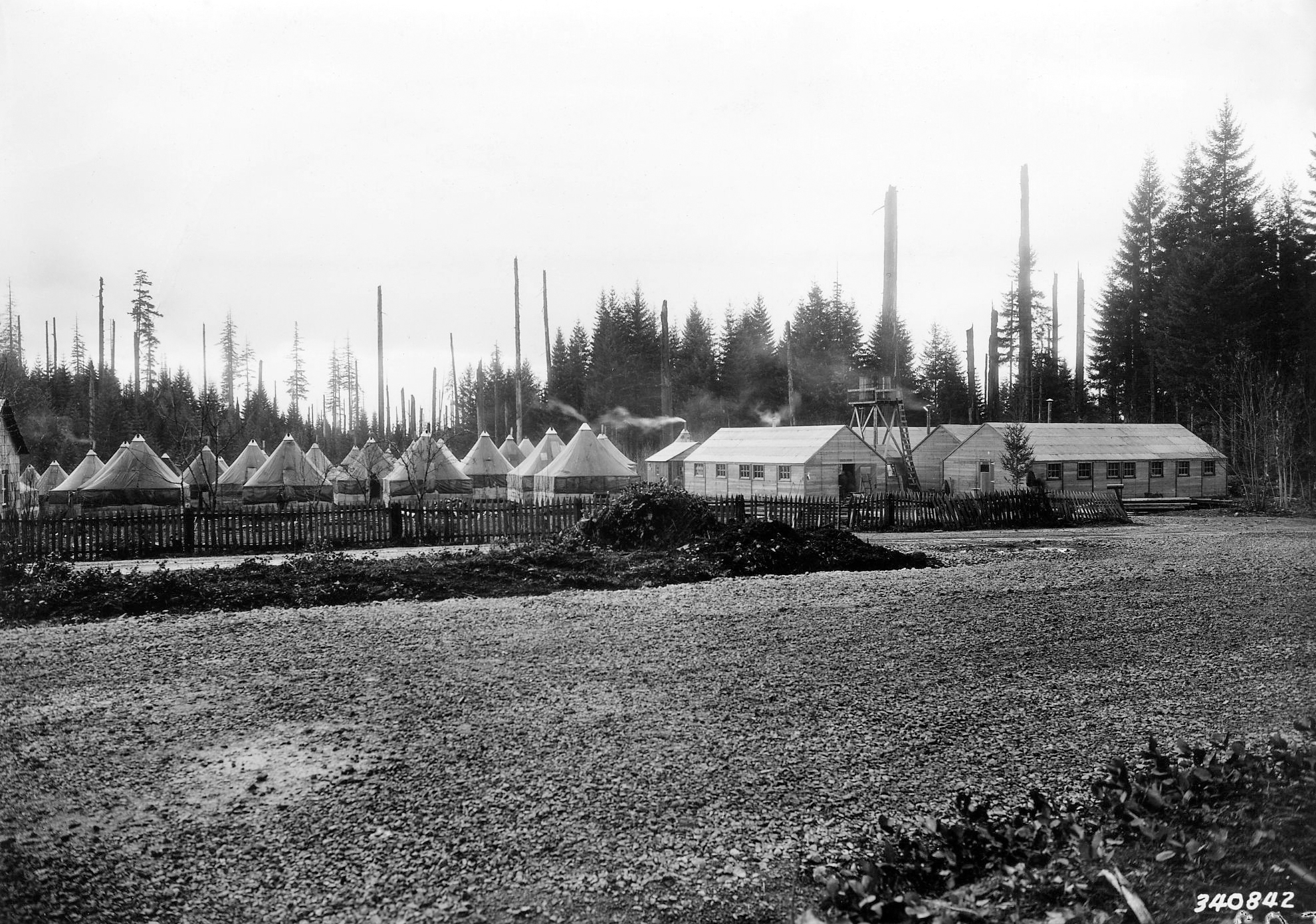
WPA workers lived in a nearby tent city while building Timberline Lodge (1936).

Each workman on Timberline Lodge gained proficiency in manual arts. He was a better workman, a better citizen, progressing by infinitely-slow steps to the degree above him.

— The Builders of Timberline Lodge, Federal Writers' Project

Timberline Lodge, a mountain lodge and resort hotel, is a four-story structure of about 40,000 square feet (3,700 m^{2}). The ground-level exterior walls are heavy rubble masonry, using boulders from the immediate area, and heavy timber is used from the first floor up. The central head house section is hexagonal and sixty feet (18 m) in diameter, with a six-sided stone chimney stack ninety feet (27 m) high and fourteen feet (4.3 m) in diameter. Each of the six fireplace openings—three on the ground floor, three on the first floor—is five feet (1.5 m) wide and seven feet (2.1 m) high. Two wings, running west and southeast, flank the head house. Oregon woods used throughout the building include cedar, Douglas fir, hemlock, western juniper and ponderosa pine.

The architect of Timberline Lodge is Gilbert Stanley Underwood, noted for the Ahwahnee Hotel and other lodges in the U.S. national park system. He produced the designs. Then, his central head house was modified from an octagon to a hexagon by U.S. Forest Service architect W. I. (Tim) Turner and the team of Linn A. Forrest, Howard L. Gifford and Dean R. E. Wright. A recent graduate of the University of Washington, forest service engineer Ward Gano was structural designer.

Timberline Lodge was constructed between 1936 and 1938 as a Works Progress Administration project during The Great Depression. Eighty percent of the WPA's $695,730 total expenditure on building costs went toward labor. Skilled building trade workers received ninety cents an hour; unskilled laborers received fifty-five cents an hour. Some of the skilled stonemasons on the project were Italian immigrants brought in after working on The Historic Columbia River Highway and other roads in Oregon. About a hundred construction workers were on site at a given time, and lived at a nearby tent city. Jobs were rotated to provide work.

Materials costs were minimized by the skillful use of recycled materials. Women wove draperies, upholstery, and bedspreads. Hooked rugs were made from strips of old Civilian Conservation Corps camp blankets. Discarded cedar utility poles became newel-posts with their crowns hand-carved into birds, bears, and seals. Fireplace screens were fashioned from tire chains. Andirons and other iron work were forged from railroad tracks. WPA workers used large timbers and local stone from the site.

"All classes, from the most elementary hand labor, through the various degrees of skill to the technically-trained, were employed," reported the WPA's Federal Writers' Project. "Pick and shovel wielders, stonecutters, plumbers, carpenters, steam-fitters, painters, wood-carvers, cabinet-makers, metal workers, leather-toolers, seamstresses, weavers, architects, authors, artists, actors, musicians, and landscape planners, each contributed to the project, and each, in his way, was conscious of the ideal toward which all bent their energies."

=== Federal Art Project ===
Federal Art Project contributions to the project were directed by Margery Hoffman Smith, Oregon Arts Project administrator. Smith created many designs for textiles and rugs. She designed the iconic "snow goose", the 750-pound (340 kg) bronze weather vane above the head house. Smith based the abstract forms incised into the lodge chimney on the art of the local Tenino people. Likely-acquainted with William Gray Purcell, a fellow resident of Portland, Smith saw the Prairie School aesthetic carried through in tables, chairs, sectional sofas, columns, bedspreads, draperies, lampshades, and pendant lighting fixtures. She commissioned murals, paintings and carvings from Oregon's WPA artists.

== Dedication ==
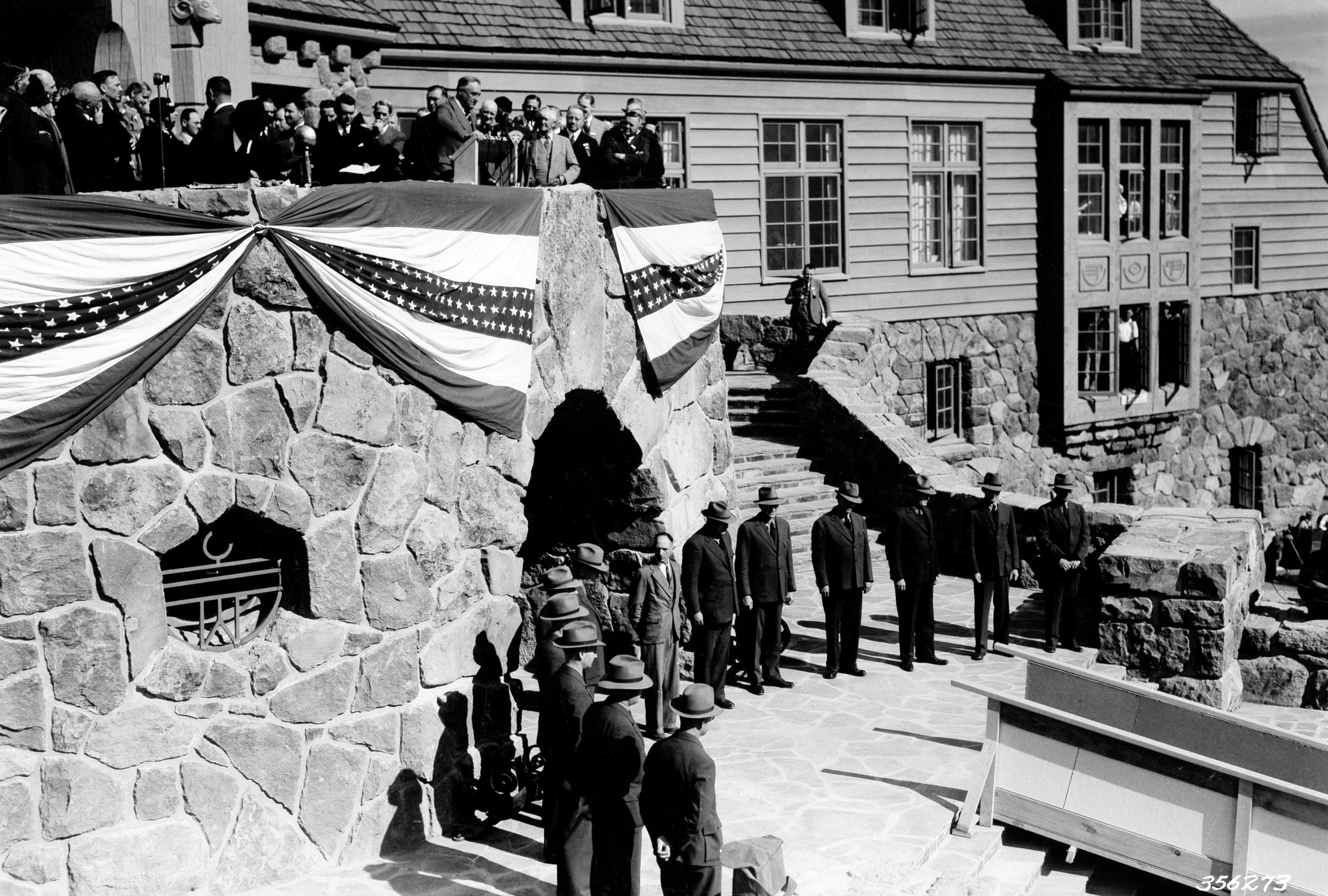
Franklin D. Roosevelt at lectern, dedicating Timberline Lodge (September 28, 1937)

During an inspection tour of government activities in the western U.S., President Franklin D. Roosevelt dedicated Timberline Lodge on September 28, 1937. In his speech, he said:

This Timberline Lodge marks a venture that was made possible by WPA, emergency relief work, in order that we may test the workability of recreational facilities installed by the Government itself and operated under its complete control.

Here, to Mount Hood, will come thousands and thousands of visitors in the coming years. Looking east toward eastern Oregon with its great livestock raising areas, these visitors are going to visualize the relationship between the cattle ranches and the summer ranges in the forests. Looking westward and northward toward Portland and the Columbia River, with their great lumber and other wood using industries, they will understand the part which National Forest timber will play in the support of this important element of northwestern prosperity.

Those who will follow us to Timberline Lodge on their holidays and vacations will represent the enjoyment of new opportunities for play in every season of the year. I mention specially every season of the year because we, as a nation, I think, are coming to realize that the summer is not the only time for play. I look forward to the day when many, many people from this region of the Nation are going to come here for skiing and tobogganing and various other forms of winter sports."

He dedicated the lodge, saying, "I am here to dedicate the Timberline Lodge and I do so in the words of the bronze tablet directly in front of me on the coping of this wonderful building: 'Timberline Lodge, Mount Hood National Forest dedicated September 28, 1937, by the President of the United States as a monument to the skill and faithful performance of workers on the rolls of the Works Progress Administration'".

FDR and Eleanor Roosevelt enjoyed a celebratory luncheon including salmon and huckleberry pie. In her My Day column, Mrs. Roosevelt praised the lodge's architectural features: "It is built exclusively of native products and by WPA labor. The interesting central fire place with its many openings is a feature I have seen in no other building of its kind and no where have I seen such big timbers used. All the furniture, all the hangings, all the iron work as well, were made by WPA workers. Here is a group of workers who have the makings of a handcraft organization, and I hope their work will be appreciated. Mr. Griffith, the state WPA administrator, must be happy over the work done here."

Most work was complete at the time of the dedication. After some interior details were finished, the lodge opened to the public February 4, 1938.

== Operation ==
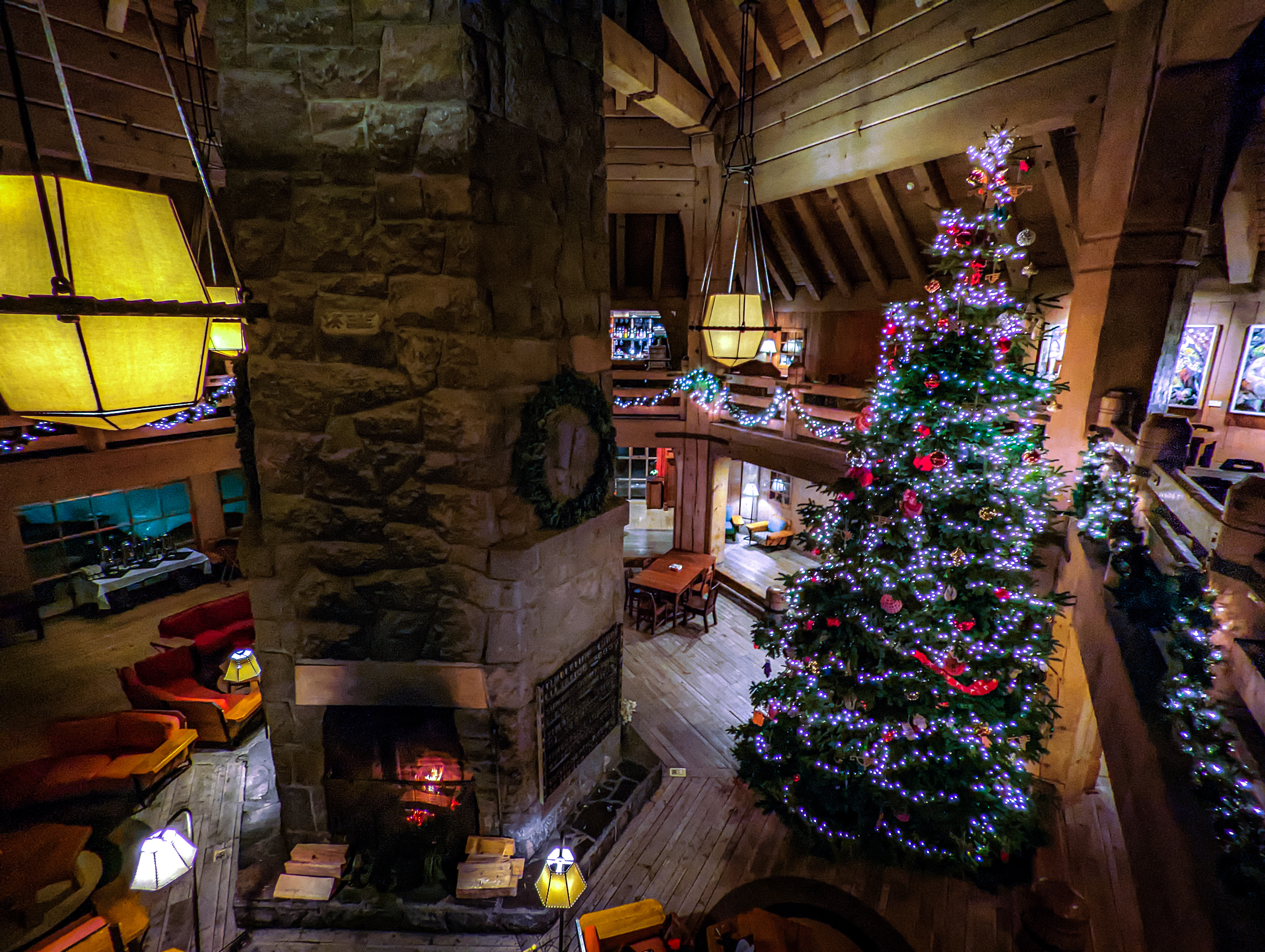
View of the Headhouse in the lodge during the holiday season

Franklin Roosevelt's vision of winter sports at Timberline Lodge took hesitant steps the following year. A portable rope tow was installed, and construction began on the Magic Mile chairlift, which opened November 1939.

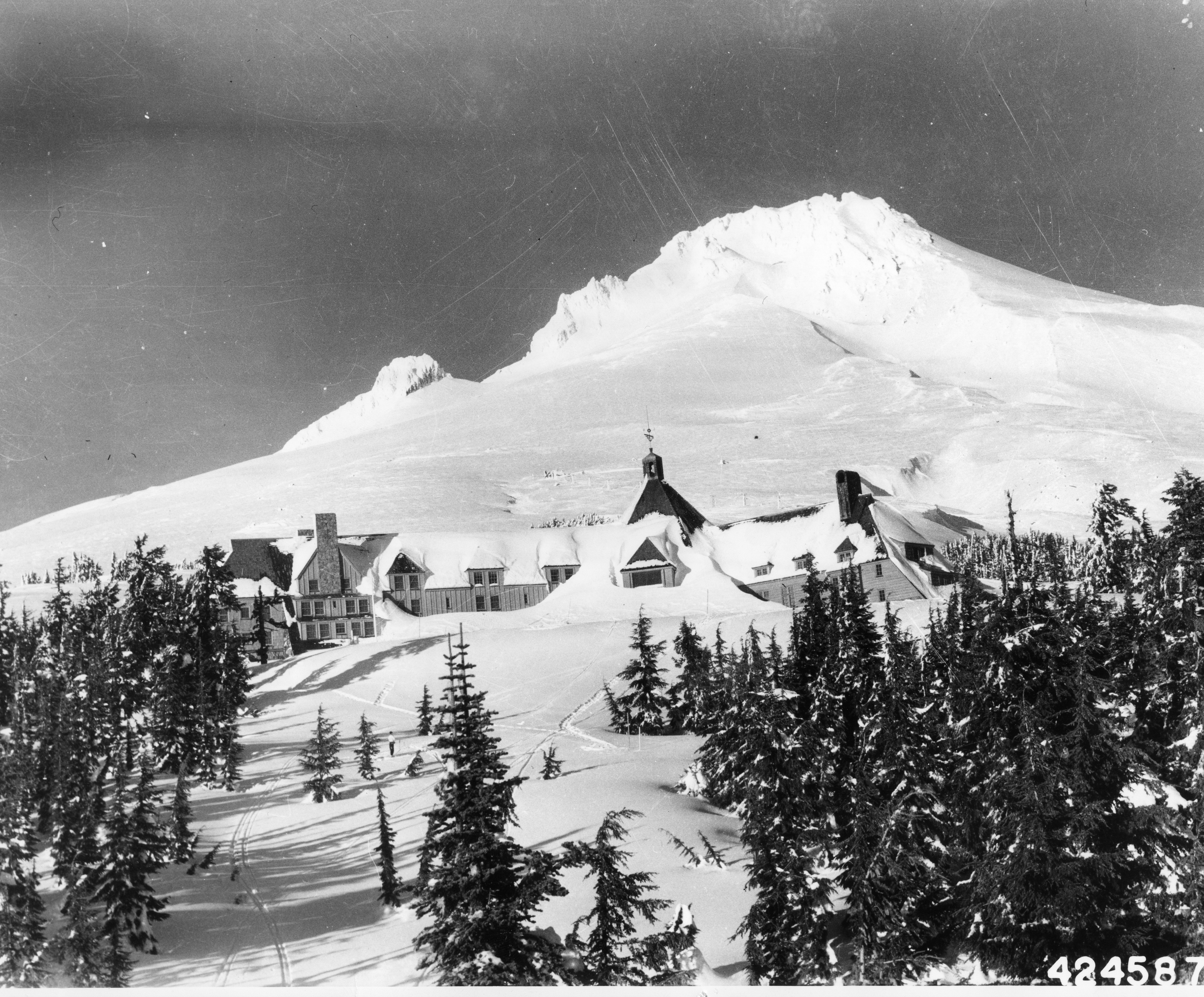
Closed during the winter of 1942–43 because of World War II, Timberline Lodge fell into decline.

In the lodge's early years, none of its four operators were willing or able to maintain it. By 1955, Timberline Lodge was closed.

Richard Kohnstamm, the next operator, recalled difficulties due to financing problems because the government claimed they owned it. Kohnstamm decided to maintain the place as if he owned it; he lost money during his first five years of operation, but his timing was fortuitous. He took over only a few years before skiing exploded in popularity in the late 1950s. That popularity helped the family generate a profit starting in 1960. Kohnstamm, "the man who saved Timberline", died at the age of 80 on April 21, 2006. Kohnstamm's son Jeff is the Area Operator of Timberline Lodge.

=== As a shooting location ===
==== Film ====
Exterior views of Timberline Lodge were used in The Shining (1980), Stanley Kubrick's film adaptation of Stephen King's 1977 novel set at the fictional Overlook Hotel. The staff and owners were concerned that guests would be reluctant to stay in Room 217 if it were featured in a horror movie; the management requested the room number be changed to the fictional Room 237, which Kubrick granted.

Other feature films shot at or around Timberline Lodge include Jingle Belles (1941), Bend of the River (1952), All the Young Men (1960), Lost Horizon (1973), Ski School (1991), Hear No Evil (1993), and Wild (2014).

==== Television ====
Brief exterior views of a snowy Timberline Lodge were used as a stand-in for a "Bavarian Ski Resort" in multiple episodes of Hogan's Heroes. Director Boris Sagal was killed in an accident on the third day of filming the NBC-TV miniseries World War III (1982), after he walked into the tail rotor blades of a helicopter in Timberline Lodge's parking lot. Palm Royale S2.E8 "Maxine Hits the Slopes" (2025) features extensive scenes shot throughout the hotel, including common areas, rooms, and outdoor scenes of Mnt Hood with downhill skiing.

== Events ==
In 2017, the inaugural Overlook Film Festival was held at Timberline Lodge. The following year, the festival moved to New Orleans, Louisiana.

On April 18, 2024 a fire broke out at the lodge requiring multiple fire agencies to respond.

== Climate ==
Climate data for Timberline Lodge 45.3319 N, 121.7102 W, Elevation: 6,001 ft (1,829 m) (1991–2020 normals)
Month	Jan	Feb	Mar	Apr	May	Jun	Jul	Aug	Sep	Oct	Nov	Dec	Year
Mean daily maximum °F (°C)	33.4 (0.8)	34.1 (1.2)	36.5 (2.5)	39.6 (4.2)	47.9 (8.8)	54.2 (12.3)	64.9 (18.3)	65.4 (18.6)	59.1 (15.1)	47.3 (8.5)	37.2 (2.9)	32.4 (0.2)	46.0 (7.8)
Daily mean °F (°C)	28.1 (−2.2)	27.8 (−2.3)	29.2 (−1.6)	32.0 (0.0)	39.2 (4.0)	45.0 (7.2)	54.3 (12.4)	54.8 (12.7)	49.7 (9.8)	39.9 (4.4)	31.7 (−0.2)	27.3 (−2.6)	38.3 (3.5)
Mean daily minimum °F (°C)	22.8 (−5.1)	21.5 (−5.8)	22.0 (−5.6)	24.4 (−4.2)	30.5 (−0.8)	35.8 (2.1)	43.7 (6.5)	44.3 (6.8)	40.2 (4.6)	32.5 (0.3)	26.1 (−3.3)	22.1 (−5.5)	30.5 (−0.8)
Average precipitation inches (mm)	16.37 (416)	12.36 (314)	12.78 (325)	10.13 (257)	6.77 (172)	5.36 (136)	1.22 (31)	1.75 (44)	4.17 (106)	9.70 (246)	16.27 (413)	16.72 (425)	113.6 (2,885)
Average snowfall inches (cm)	95 (240)	102 (260)	89 (230)	59 (150)	20 (51)	5 (13)	0.1 (0.25)	0 (0)	6 (15)	21 (53)	40 (100)	106 (270)	543.1 (1,382.25)
Average extreme snow depth inches (cm)	102 (260)	128 (330)	144 (370)	152 (390)	125 (320)	67 (170)	16 (41)	2 (5.1)	3 (7.6)	11 (28)	35 (89)	71 (180)	154 (390)
Source 1: National Weather Service (snow depth 1995-2025)
Source 2: PRISM Climate Group
