= Architects of the United States Forest Service =

Architects of the United States Forest Service are credited with the design of many buildings and other structures in National Forests. Some of these are listed on the National Register of Historic Places due to the significance of their architecture. A number of these architectural works are attributed to architectural groups within the Forest Service rather than to any individual architect. Architecture groups or sections were formed within engineering divisions of many of the regional offices of the Forest Service and developed regional styles.

National consulting architect W. Ellis Groben led development of architectural style for the Forest Service, including by his important 1940 document, "Architectural Trend of Future Forest Service Buildings" and by his 1938 compilation "Acceptable Building Plans: Forest Service Administrative Buildings". He advocated what is now known as non-intrusive architectural design, and advocated regional styles rather than universal style.

Architects of several regions and their works are discussed in the following sections, with the regions having the most information available about them first.

== Region 6 ==
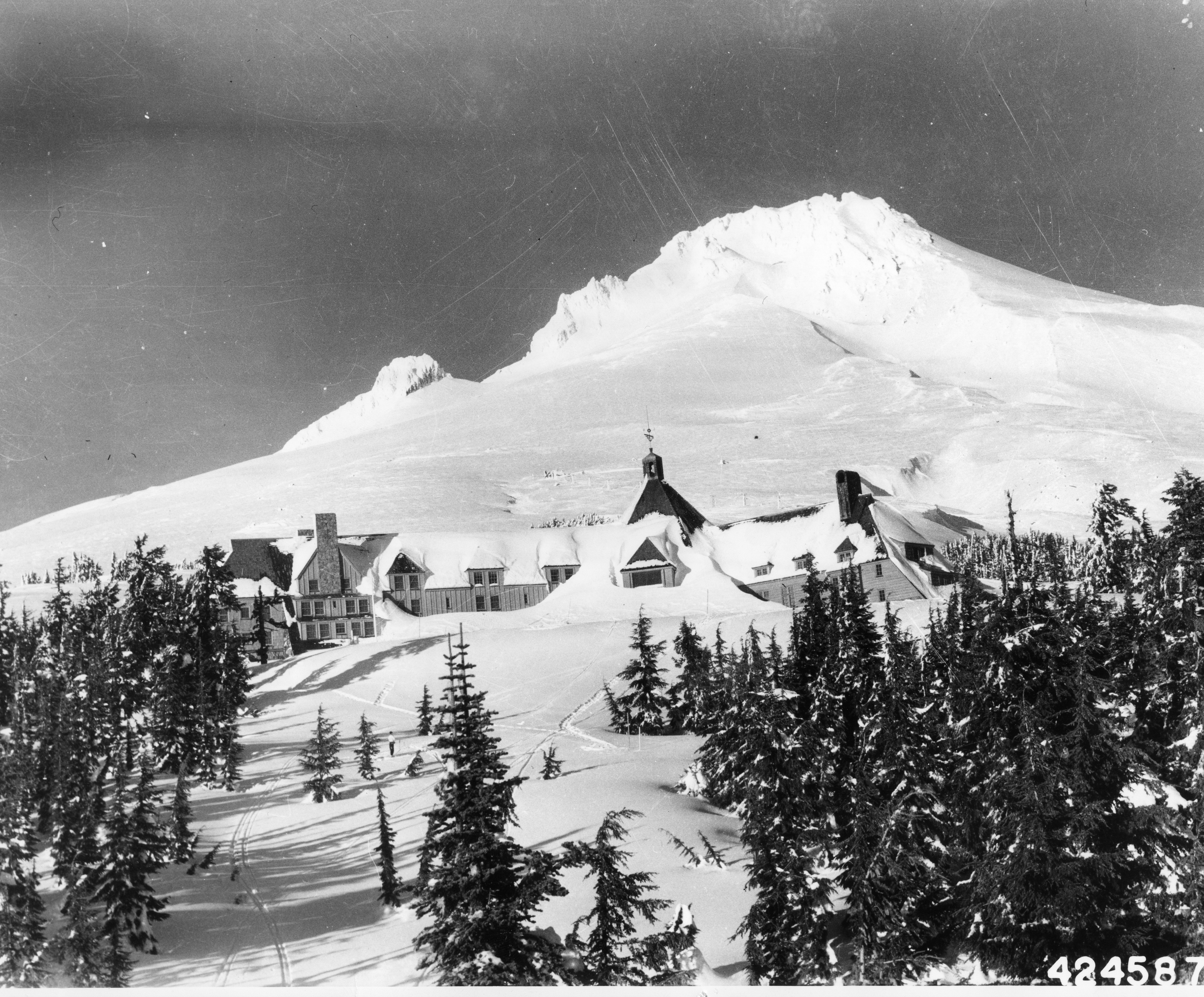
Timberline Lodge, Mt. Hood, Oregon, 1943

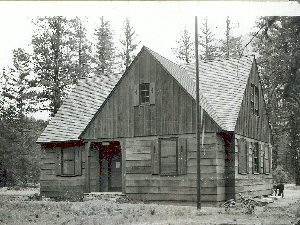
Early Winters Ranger Station

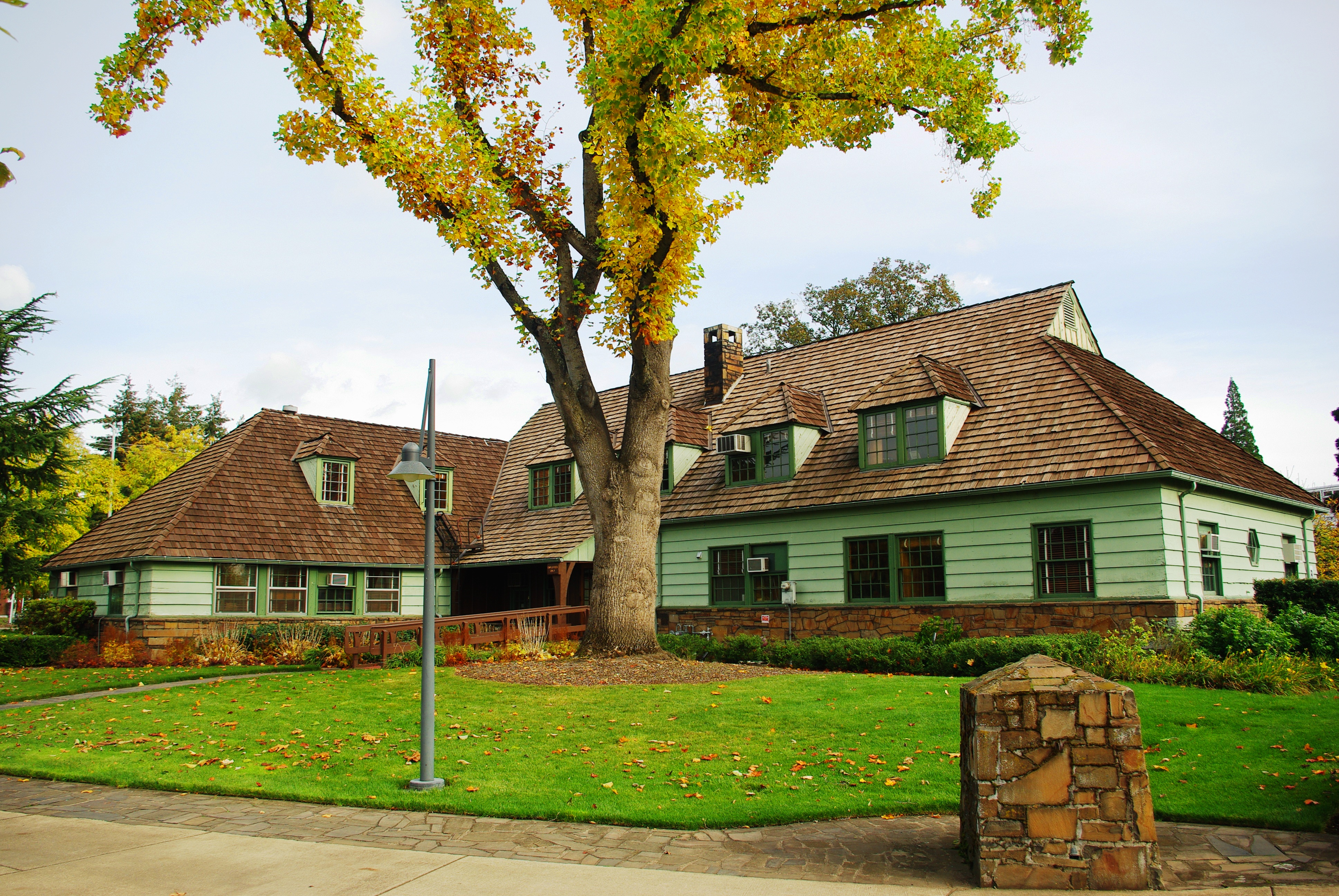
Oregon State Forester's Office Building

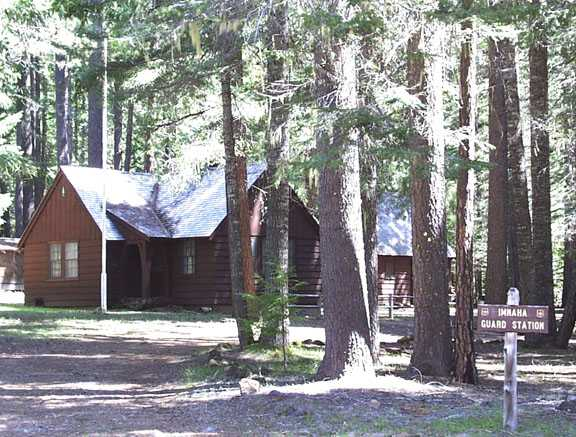
Imnaha Guard Station

The architecture group of the Forest Service's Northwest regional office, Region 6, designed works in Oregon and Washington. At an early date the architecture group of this region included architects Linn A. Forrest, Howard L. Gifford, James Pollock and W.I. "Tim" Turner, and landscape architect Emmett U. Blanchfield. According to the National Register nomination for many of their works, "The style that emerged from the Pacific Northwest Region had no clearly identifiable architectural prototype, but reflected the influence of the English Cottage and Norman Farmhouse styles."

Ellis Groben, national leader of architecture in the Forest Service, reportedly "was impressed with the Northwest Cascadian style of architecture that was started by Tim Turner, Linn Forrest, Dean Wright, and Howard Gifford on Timberline Lodge and numerous CCC facilities in the Washington and Oregon area." Around 1951, architects of the region included A.P. "Benny" DiBenedetto, FAIA, Bill Hummel, Dick Parker, Ken Grimes, Doug Parmenter, and Norm Krause. Around 1958, Joe Mastrandrea, Perry Carter, Ken Reynolds, Terry Young, and Tom Morland joined the staff.

The Region 6 design team received several awards for laboratories in Oregon. DiBenedetto was elected to be president for the Oregon Council of Architects, to be Director of the Pacific and Northwest Region of the American Institute of Architects (ALA) and to serve on the National Board of AIA all while serving as Regional Architect in Region 6 (1951–1961) or as Station Architect, Pacific Northwest (1961–1979).

There are 25 locations whose design is attributed to the Region 6 group. Notable works of Region 6 architects (with attribution as given in NRHP listing if applicable) include:

- Breitenbush Guard Station, Willamette National Forest, Detroit, Oregon (USDA Forest Svce. Architecture Group), NRHP-listed
- Butte Falls Ranger Station, Rogue River National Forest, Butte Falls, Oregon (USDA Forest Svce. Architecture Group), NRHP-listed
- Cabin Lake Guard Station, Deschutes National Forest, Bend, Oregon (USDA Forest Svce. Architecture Group), NRHP-listed
- Cascade Locks Work Center, Mt. Hood National Forest, Cascade Locks Oregon (USDA Forest Svce. Architecture Group), NRHP-listed
- Cedar Guard Station No. 1019, Illinois Valley Rd., Siskiyou National Forest, Cave Junction, Oregon (USDA Forest Svce. Architecture Group), NRHP-listed
- Chatter Creek Guard Station, Wenatchee National Forest, Leavenworth, Washington (USDA Forest Svce. Architecture Group), NRHP-listed
- Early Winters Ranger Station Work Center, Okanogan National Forest, Winthrop, Washington (USDA Forest Svce. Architecture Group), NRHP-listed
- Glide Ranger Station, Umpqua National Forest, Glide, Oregon (USDA Forest Svce. Architecture Group), NRHP-listed
- Gold Beach Ranger Station, Siskiyou National Forest, Gold Beach, Oregon (USDA Forest Svce. Architecture Group), NRHP-listed
- Imnaha Guard Station, Rogue River National Forest, Butte Falls, Oregon (USDA Forest Svce. Architecture Group), NRHP-listed
- John Day Compound, Supervisor's Warehouse, Malheur National Forest, John Day, Oregon (USDA Forest Svce. Architecture Group), NRHP-listed
- La Wis Wis Guard Station No. 1165, Gifford Pinchot National Forest, Packwood, Washington (USDA Forest Svce. Architecture Group), NRHP-listed
- Lake of the Woods Ranger Station-Work Center, Winema National Forest, Klamath Falls, Oregon (USDA Forest Svce. Architecture Group), NRHP-listed
- Lamonta Compound-Prineville Supervisor's Warehouse, Ochoco National Forest, Prineville, Oregon (USDA Forest Svce. Architecture Group), NRHP-listed
- Leavenworth Ranger Station, Wenatchee National Forest, Leavenworth, Washington (USDA Forest Svce. Architecture Group), NRHP-listed
- Lick Creek Guard Station, Wallowa-Whitman National Forest, Enterprise, Oregon (USDA Forest Svce. Architecture Group), NRHP-listed
- Lost Lake Guard Station, Okanogan National Forest, Tonasket, Washington (USDA Forest Svce. Architecture Group), NRHP-listed
- North Fork Guard Station No. 1142, Randle Ranger Station, Gifford Pinchot National Forest, Randle, Washington (USDA Forest Svce. Architecture Group), NRHP-listed
- Olympus Guard Station, Olympia National Park, NRHP-listed
- Oregon State Forester's Office Building, 2600 State Street, Salem, Oregon (Linn A. Forrest Sr.)
- Parkdale Ranger Station, Mt. Hood National Forest, Parkdale, Oregon (USDA Forest Svce. Architecture Group), NRHP-listed
- Paulina Lake Guard Station, Deschutes National Forest, Bend, Oregon (USDA Forest Svce. Architecture Group), NRHP-listed
- Randle Ranger Station-Work Center, Gifford Pinchot National Forest, Randle, Washington (USDA Forest Svce. Architecture Group), NRHP-listed
- Silcox Hut, near Timberline Lodge, Oregon (Tim Turner)
- Store Gulch Guard Station No. 1020, Illinois Valley Rd., Siskiyou National Forest, Cave Junction, Oregon (USDA Forest Svce. Architecture Group), NRHP-listed
- Supervisor's House No. 1001, Malheur National Forest, John Day, Oregon (USDA Forest Svce. Architecture Group), NRHP-listed
- Timberline Lodge on Mount Hood, near Government Camp, Oregon (W. I. Turner, et al.)
- Unity Ranger Station, Wallowa-Whitman National Forest, Unity, Oregon (USDA Forest Svce. Architecture Group), NRHP-listed
- Verlot Ranger Station-Public Service Center, Mt. Baker, Snoqualmie National Forest, Granite Falls, Washington (USDA Forest Svce. Architecture Group), NRHP-listed
- Zigzag Ranger Station, Mt. Hood National Forest, Zigzag, Oregon (USDA Forest Svce. Architecture Group), NRHP-listed

== Region 3 ==
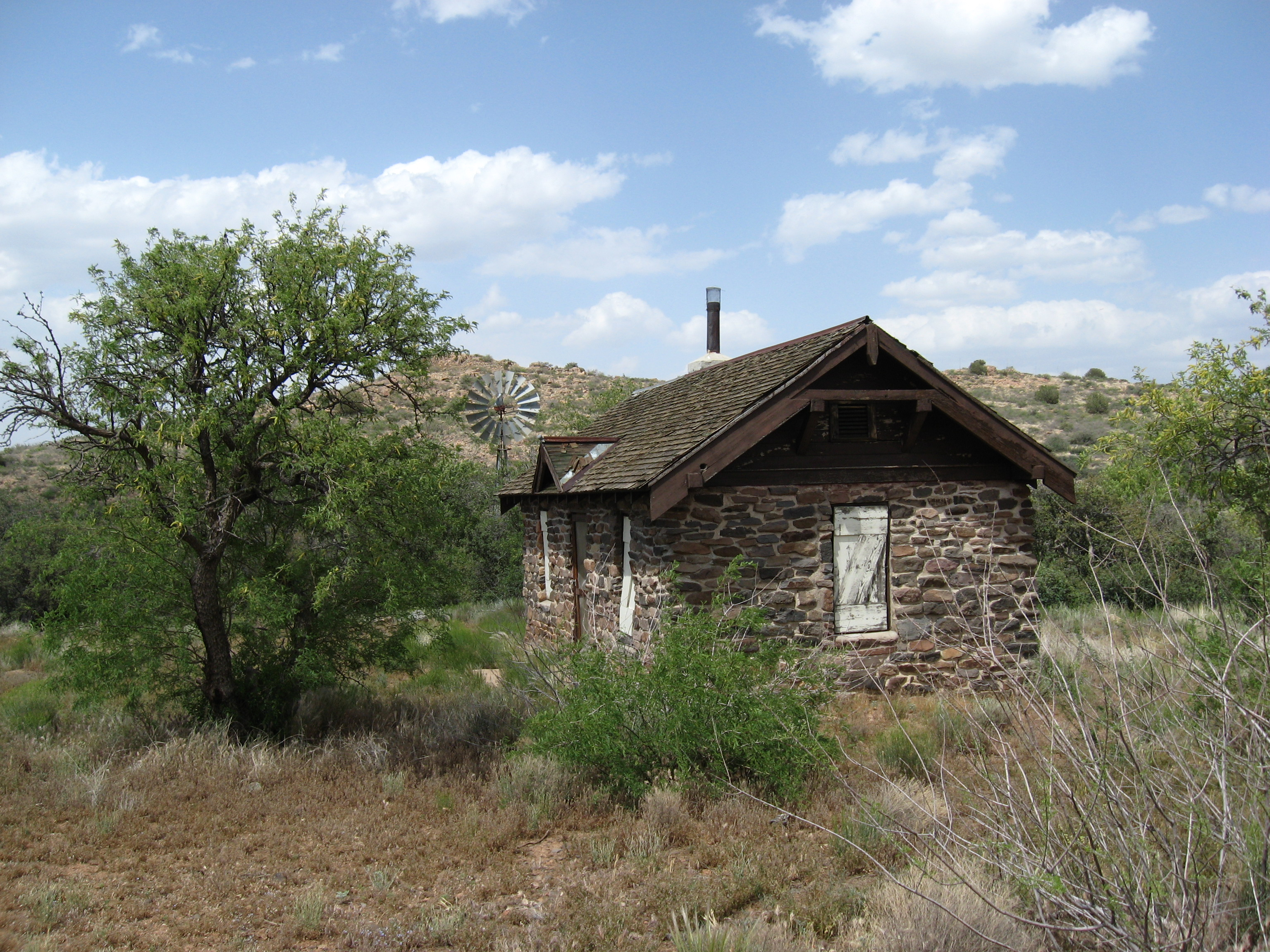
1935 Copper Creek Guard Station, in 2008

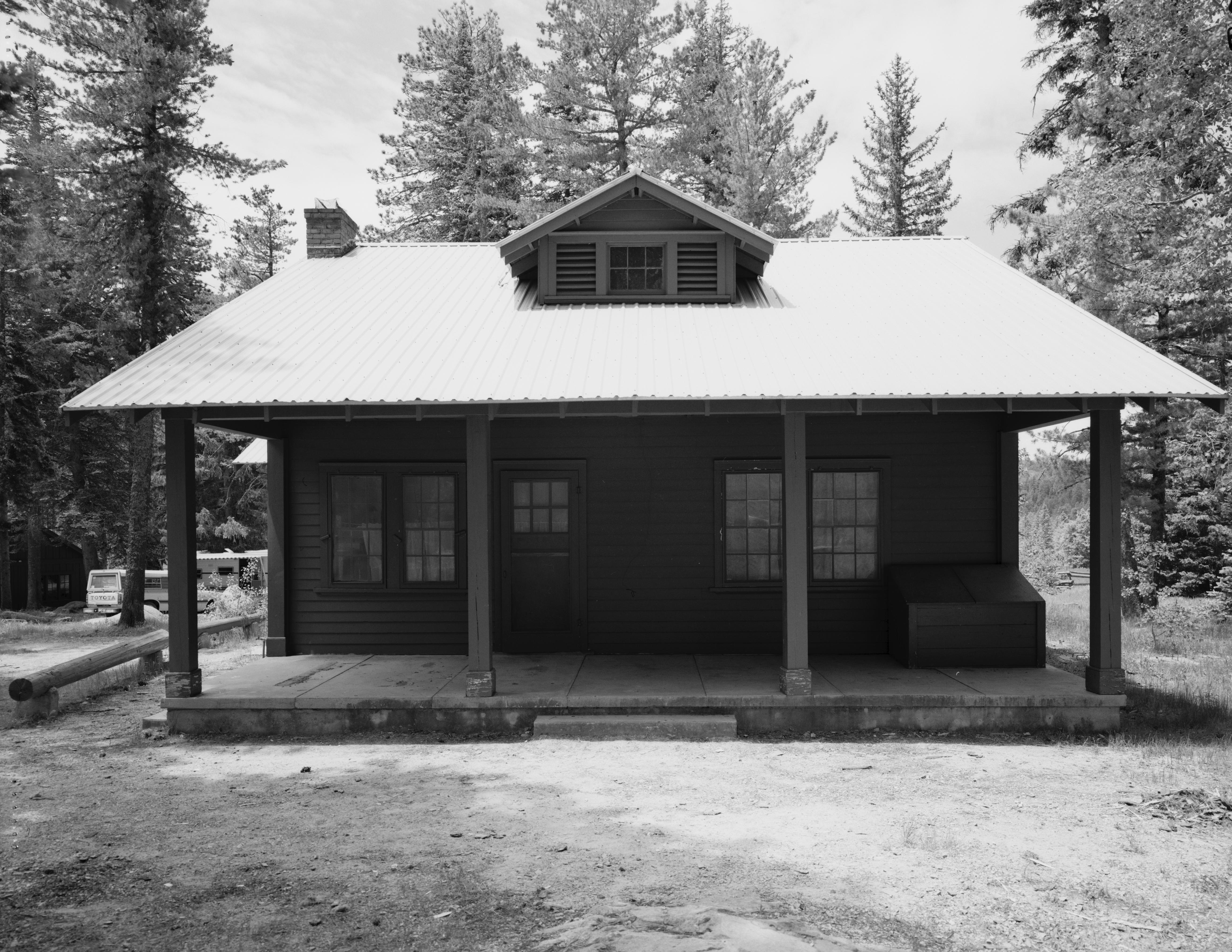
1935 Columbine Work Station, in 1991

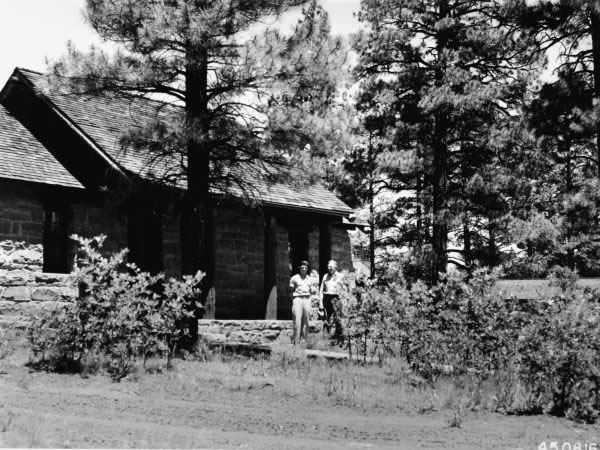
Moqui Ranger Station, in 1948

In Region 3, standard plans were prepared under direction from the National Forest's Washington office, but architects at the Region 3 office created plans in the Bungalow style. Bungalow style had been popular for small houses in the U.S. from about 1905 to 1930, and was waning in popularity when Region 3 adopted it. The Region 3 architects further adapted the floor plans of this style for wood frame and for masonry construction in different environmental areas (timbered areas vs. grasslands vs. desert), and adopted Spanish Eclectic and Pueblo Revival styling for desert models. But the low cost of the Bungalow style led to it being used in desert areas, too.

Notable works of Region 3 architects include:

- Copper Creek Guard Station, NE of Black Canyon City, Tonto National Forest, Black Canyon City, AZ (USDA Forest Service), Bungalow/Craftsman style, NRHP-listed
- Beaver Creek Ranger Station, Off I-17 NE of Rimrock, Coconino NF, Rimrock, AZ (USDA Forest Service), Bungalow/Craftsman style, NRHP-listed
- Big Springs Ranger Station, Along Ryan Rd., Kaibab NF, Big Springs, AZ (Usda Forest Service), Bungalow/Craftsman style, NRHP-listed
- Camp Clover Ranger Station, Off US 66/89 SW of Williams, Kaibab NF, Williams, AZ (USDA Forest Service), Bungalow/Craftsman style, NRHP-listed
- Canelo Ranger Station, Forest Rd. 52B N of Canelo, Coronado NF, Canelo, AZ (USDA Forest Service), Bungalow/Craftsman style, NRHP-listed
- Cima Park Fire Guard Station, in Chiricahua Wilderness NE of Douglas, Coronado National Forest, Douglas, AZ (USDA Forest Service), "vernacular, log" architecture, NRHP-listed
- Columbine Work Station, AZ 366 SW of Safford, Coronado National Forest, Safford, AZ (USDA Forest Service), Bungalow/Craftsman style, NRHP-listed
- Crown King Ranger Station, W of Crown King, Prescott National Forest, Crown King, AZ (USDA Forest Service), Bungalow/Craftsman, NRHP-listed
- Lowell Ranger Station, Off Sabino Canyon Rd. NE of Tucson, Coronado National Forest, Tucson, AZ (USDA Forest Service), Pueblo architecture, NRHP-listed
- Moqui Ranger Station, Off US 180 N of Tusayan, Kaibab National Forest, Tusayan, AZ (USDA Forest Service), Bungalow/Craftsman, Rustic architecture, NRHP-listed
- Pinal Ranger Station, S of Globe, Tonto National Forest, Globe, AZ (USDA Forest Service), NRHP-listed
- Pinedale Ranger Station, Forest Rd. 130 (formerly AZ 260), Apache-Sitgreaves National Forest, Pinedale, AZ (USDA Forest Service), NRHP-listed
- Pleasant Valley Ranger Station, S of AZ 288, Tonto National Forest, Young, AZ (USDA Forest Service), NRHP-listed
- Portal Ranger Station, Forest Rd. 42A SW of Portal, Coronado National Forest, Portal, AZ (Usda Forest Service), NRHP-listed
- Rustler Park Fire Guard Station, SE of Chiricahua NM, Coronado National Forest, Douglas, AZ (Usda Forest Service), NRHP-listed
- Sedona Ranger Station, Brewer Rd. S. of Hart Rd., Sedona AZ (USDA/USFS Standard Plans), NRHP-listed
- Sunflower Ranger Station, AZ 87 W of Punkin Center, Tonto National Forest, Punkin Center, AZ (USDA Forest Service), NRHP-listed
- Sycamore Ranger Station, Forest Rd. 68F SW of Camp Verde, Prescott National Forest, Camp Verde, AZ (USDA Forest Service), NRHP-listed
- Walnut Creek Ranger Station, NW of Prescott, Prescott National Forest, Prescott, AZ (USDA Forest Service), NRHP-listed
- Water Canyon Administrative Site, Forest Rd. 285 S of Springerville, Apache-Sitgreaves National Forest, Springerville, AZ (USDA Forest Service), NRHP-listed

== Region 2 ==
Notable works of Region 2 architects (with attribution as given in NRHP listing, if applicable) include:

- Brush Creek Work Center, WY 130 E of Saratoga, Medicine Bow National Forest, Saratoga, WY (USDA Forest Service, Region 2), NRHP-listed
- Centennial Work Center, Off WY 130 NW of Centennial, Medicine Bow NF, Centennial, WY (USDA Forest Service, Region 2), NRHP-listed
- Keystone Work Center, W of Albany, Medicine Bow NF, Albany, WY (USDA Forest Service, Region 2), NRHP-listed
- La Prele Work Center, SW of Douglas, Medicine Bow NF, Douglas, WY (USDA Forest Service, Region 2), NRHP-listed

== Region 5 ==
Notable architects of Region 5, California, include Keplar B. Johnson

== Region 4 ==
The Lamoille Organization Camp near Lamoille in Elko County, Nevada is a work of the Region 4 Forest Service.

Also the Paradise Valley Ranger Station, in Humboldt County, Nevada, is a work of Forest Service design, built by the CCC.

== Region 1 ==
The Big Creek Ranger Station Historic District, in Flathead National Forest in Flathead County, Montana, is a work of Region 1.

Lost Horse Fireman's Cabin, Ravalli County, Montana, is built to a standard Region 1 plan, but with a drive-through porch designed by Clyde Fickes.

== Other areas ==
Notable works of other areas' architects (with attribution as given in NRHP listing, if applicable) include:

- Kawishiwi Field Laboratory, Minnesota, preservation supported by National Trust for Historic Preservation, deemed NRHP-eligible
- Arctic Point Fire Lookout, N of Big Creek, Idaho Primitive Area, Payette National Forest, Big Creek, ID (USDA Forest Service), with Aermotor fire tower assembled by Forest Service, plus additional Forest Service structures. NRHP-listed
- Atlanta Ranger Station Historic District, Boise National Forest, Atlanta, ID (USDA Forest Service), NRHP-listed
- Big Creek Commissary, Yellow Pine, Payette National Forest, Big Creek, ID (USDA Forest Service), NRHP-listed
- Carey Dome Fire Lookout, Payette National Forest, 9 mi. N of USFS Burgdorf Guard Sta, Burgdorf, ID (USDA Forest Service), NRHP-listed
- Chamberlain Ranger Station Historic District, Idaho County, Idaho, including log building built in 1937–38 to USFS standard plan, NRHP-listed
- Council Ranger Station, Council, Idaho, a complex of five frame buildings which includes use of standard plans.
- Dam-Sitting Bull Falls Recreation Area, Sitting Bull Falls, Lincoln National Forest, Carlsbad, NM (USDA-Forest Service), NRHP-listed
- Group Picnic Shelter-Sitting Bull Falls Recreation Area, Sitting Bull Falls, Lincoln National Forest, Carlsbad, NM (USDA-Forest Service), NRHP-listed
- Isabella Ranger Station, Address Restricted, Isabella, MN (USDA Forest Service), NRHP-listed
- Ketchikan Ranger House, 309 Gorge St., Ketchikan, AK (USDA Forest Service), NRHP-listed
- Mallard Peak Lookout, SE of Avery, ID (USDA Forest Service), NRHP-listed
- Mondeaux Dam Recreation Area, Roughly bounded by Mondeaux River and Forest Rd., Westboro, WI (USDA Forest Service), NRHP-listed
- Picnic Shelter-Sitting Bull Falls Recreation Area, Sitting Bull Falls, Lincoln National Forest, Carlsbad, NM (USDA-Forest Service), NRHP-listed
- Warren Guard Station, Building 1206 (1934), southwestern side of Warren Wagon Rd. (United States Forest Service Highway 21), in Payette National Forest in Warren, Idaho

== See also ==
- History of the United States Forest Service
- Architects of the National Park Service
- List of national forests of the United States
