= National Register of Historic Places listings in Okanogan County, Washington =

Location of Okanogan County in Washington

This list presents the full set of buildings, structures, objects, sites, or districts designated on the National Register of Historic Places in Okanogan County, Washington, and offers brief descriptive information about each of them. The National Register recognizes places of national, state, or local historic significance across the United States. Out of over 90,000 National Register sites nationwide, Washington is home to approximately 1,500, and 17 of those are found in Okanogan County.

This National Park Service list is complete through NPS recent listings posted August 7, 2026.

== Current listings ==
	Name on the Register	Image	Date listed	Location	City or town	Description
1	Bonaparte Mountain Cabin	Bonaparte Mountain Cabin	April 20, 1981 (#81000588)	E of Tonasket in Okanogan National Forest; 48°47′06″N 119°07′17″W	Havillah	1914 fire lookout, first lookout built in eastern Washington, succeeded in 1930 by a 17' lookout, that lookout demolished and replaced in 1960 by current tower.
2	Chief Joseph Memorial	Chief Joseph Memorial	May 15, 1974 (#74001970)	Near jct. of WA 10A and Cache Creek Rd. 48°10′08″N 118°58′34″W	Nespelem	
3	Columbia River Bridge at Bridgeport	Columbia River Bridge at Bridgeport	May 31, 1995 (#95000632)	WA 17 over the Columbia R. 48°00′04″N 119°39′13″W	Bridgeport	
4	Early Winters Ranger Station Work Center	Early Winters Ranger Station Work Center	April 11, 1986 (#86000841)	Okanogan National Forest; 48°35′41″N 120°25′48″W	Winthrop	
5	Enloe Dam and Powerplant	Enloe Dam and Powerplant	October 18, 1978 (#78002764)	4 mi (6.4 km). (6.4 km) W of Oroville; 48°57′57″N 119°30′03″W	Oroville	
6	Sites of Fort Okanogan	Sites of Fort Okanogan	June 4, 1973 (#73001883)	N of Bridgeport between the Columbia and Okanogan Rivers; 48°05′59″N 119°43′06″W	Bridgeport	
7	Fort Okanogan Interpretive Center	Fort Okanogan Interpretive Center	August 17, 2018 (#100002814)	14379 US 17; 48°05′53″N 119°40′42″W	Brewster	
8	Grand Coulee Bridge	Grand Coulee Bridge	July 16, 1982 (#82004267)	Spans Columbia River; 47°57′56″N 118°58′53″W	Grand Coulee	Historic Bridges and Tunnels in Washington TR
9	Lost Lake Guard Station	Lost Lake Guard Station	April 11, 1986 (#86000814)	Okanogan National Forest; 48°50′42″N 119°02′54″W	Tonasket	
10	Okanogan County Courthouse	Okanogan County Courthouse	June 29, 1995 (#95000805)	149 N. Third Ave. 48°21′55″N 119°34′49″W	Okanogan	
11	Okanogan Project: Conconully Reservoir Dam	Okanogan Project: Conconully Reservoir Dam	September 6, 1974 (#74001969)	S of Conconully; 48°32′16″N 119°44′53″W	Conconully	
12	Parson Smith Tree	Parson Smith Tree	March 16, 1972 (#72001279)	24 W Chewuch Rd; 48°28′44″N 120°11′22″W	Winthrop	Formerly 40 mi (64 km). N of Winthrop on the Canada–US border in Okanogan National Forest, now in the lobby of the Methow Valley Ranger Station.
13	Saint Mary's Mission		December 20, 2018 (#100002609)	Address Restricted	Omak vicinity	
14	Hiram F. Smith Orchard	Hiram F. Smith Orchard	November 12, 1975 (#75001863)	2 mi (3.2 km). N of Oroville on Osoyoos Lake; 48°58′00″N 119°25′42″W	Oroville	
15	U.S. Post Office – Okanogan Main	U.S. Post Office – Okanogan Main	May 30, 1991 (#91000650)	212 Second Ave. N. 48°21′53″N 119°34′41″W	Okanogan	
16	U.S. Post Office – Omak Main	U.S. Post Office – Omak Main	May 30, 1991 (#91000651)	104 S. Main St. 48°24′34″N 119°31′40″W	Omak	
17	Guy Waring Cabin	Guy Waring Cabin	March 19, 1982 (#82004268)	285 Castle Ave. 48°28′36″N 120°10′50″W	Winthrop	

== See also ==
- National Register of Historic Places listings in Washington state
- Listings in neighboring counties: Chelan, Douglas, Ferry, Grant, Lincoln, Skagit, Whatcom
- Historic preservation
- History of Washington (state)
- Index of Washington (state)-related articles
