= Flathead Hotshots =

Wildland firefighters in Hungry Horse, Montana

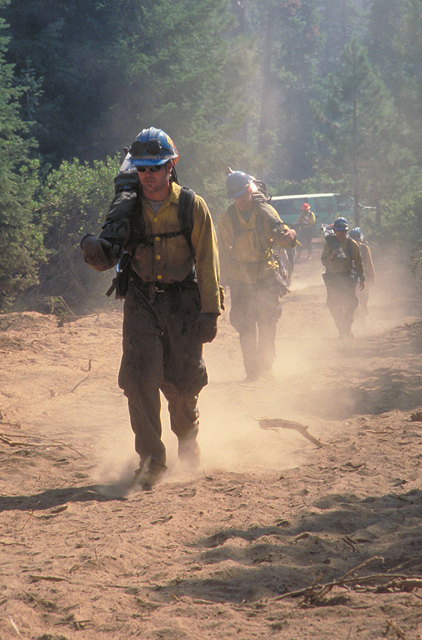
Members of the Flathead Hotshots.

The Flathead Hotshots are a U.S. Forest Service interagency hotshot crew located in the Hungry Horse Ranger District of the Flathead National Forest in Hungry Horse, Montana.

== History ==
The Flathead Hotshots were established in 1966, when the Slate Creek IR Crew was relocated from the Nez Perce National Forest to the Flathead National Forest. They were subsequently renamed the Flathead Inter-Regional Fire Suppression Crew. From 1966 until 1982 the crew was based out of the Big Creek Ranger Station located 27 miles north of Columbia Falls, MT. In 1982, the crew was relocated to the Glacier View Ranger Station. In 1993, the Flathead Hotshots were again relocated, this time to the Hungry Horse Ranger Station where they remain to this day.

== Operations ==
Today, the Flathead Hotshot crew consists of 20 highly skilled wildland firefighters. When assigned to fires, crewmembers work shifts of 16 hours per day for 14-21 consecutive days. When not fighting fires, the crew participates in rigorous calisthenics, classroom training, field training, and project work throughout the forest. In addition to wildland firefighting operations, the crew has also responded to natural disasters including Hurricane Katrina, Hurricane Ian and other search and rescue operations. The Flathead Hotshots are 1 of 7 interagency hotshot crews located in the U.S Forest Service's R1 Northern Region.

== Incidents ==
In 2008, two Flathead Hotshots crewmembers were struck by lightning while conducting a prescribed fire.

In 2010, a crewmember suffered a broken femur while assigned to the Deer Park Fire. The situation became exponentially more complicated when the air ambulance sent to evacuate the firefighter suffered a landing mishap which put the helicopter and helispot out of service. The series of events became an incident within an incident within an incident.

== See also ==
- Smokejumpers
- Helitack
- Aerial firefighting
- Great Fire of 1910
