= Kawishiwi Field Laboratory =

Buildings in Minnesota, US

Coordinates: 47°48′49″N 91°44′16″W

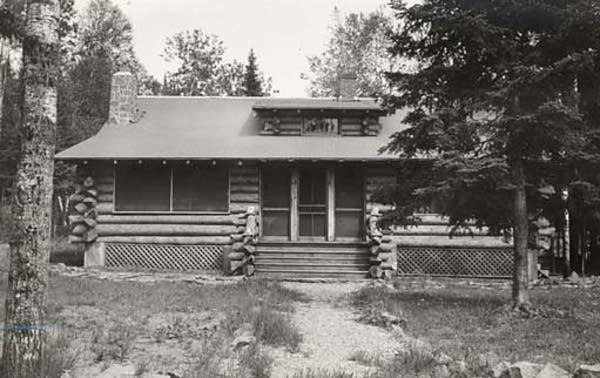
Halfway Ranger Station in 1934

The Kawishiwi Field Laboratory, in Superior National Forest near Ely, Minnesota, usually known as K-Lab, hosted one of the longest running wolf population studies in the United States. It was designed by Forest Service architects following principles laid out by national Forest Service consulting architect W. Ellis Groben. It was built by the Civilian Conservation Corps in the 1930s. It served as the Halfway Ranger Station of the United States Forest Service until the 1960s and has since been used by other organizations, including the United States Geological Service and the International Wolf Center.

The lab's eleven buildings were recently slated for demolition, but have been deemed eligible for listing on the U.S. National Register of Historic Places for their architecture.
