= Keystone Work Center =

- U.S. National Register of Historic Places
- U.S. Historic district
- Location within Wyoming Location within the United States
- Nearest city: Albany, Wyoming
- Coordinates: 41°10′9″N 106°14′55″W
- Area: 20 acres (8.1 ha)
- Built: 1941
- Architect: USDA Forest Service, Region 2
- Architectural style: USFS rustic architecture
- MPS: Depression-Era USDA Forest Service Administrative Complexes on Medicine Bow NF MPS
- NRHP reference No.: 94000275
- Added to NRHP: April 11, 1994

The Keystone Work Center in Medicine Bow National Forest near Albany, Wyoming was built in 1941. It was listed on the National Register of Historic Places in 1994 for its architecture. It was designed by architects of the U.S. Forest Service in a standard plan using log cabin rustic style. The NRHP listing included four contributing buildings on an area of 20 acres (8.1 ha).

== See also ==
- Brush Creek Work Center, also NRHP-listed in Medicine Bow National Forest
