= Cascade Locks Work Center =

- U.S. National Register of Historic Places
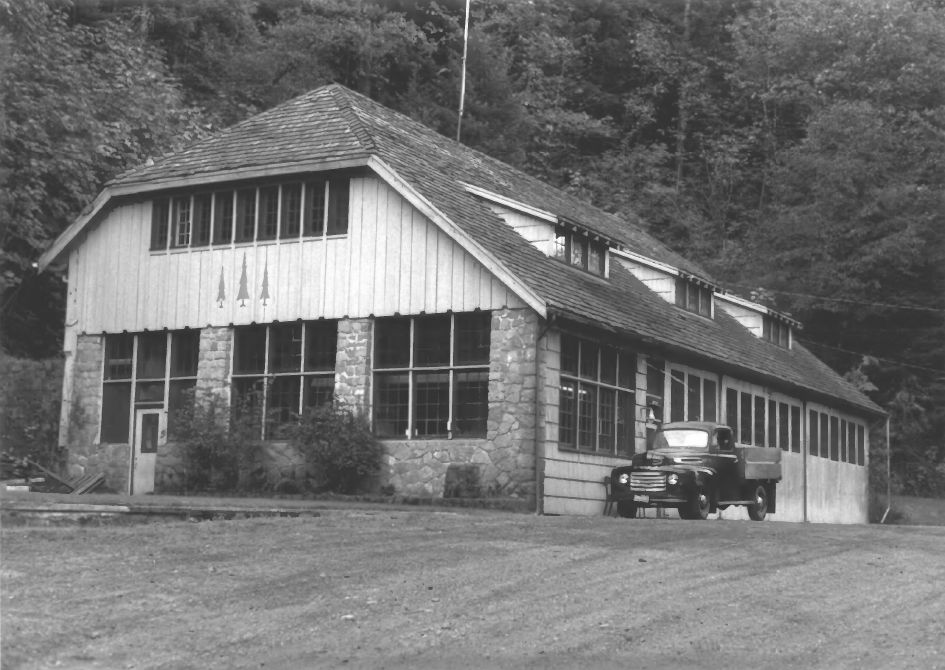
- Cascade Locks Work Center warehouse

- Location within Oregon Location within the United States
- Location: Mt. Hood National Forest, Cascade Locks, Oregon
- Coordinates: 45°40′55″N 121°50′37″W
- Area: 1.9 acres (0.77 ha)
- Built: 1936
- Architect: Architects of the United States Forest Service
- Architectural style: Rustic
- MPS: Depression-Era Buildings TR
- NRHP reference No.: 86000829
- Added to NRHP: April 11, 1986

The Cascade Locks Work Center, in Mount Hood National Forest near the town of Cascade Locks, Oregon, was built by the Civilian Conservation Corps in 1936. It was listed on the National Register of Historic Places in 1986 for its architecture. The Rustic style structures were designed by the architects of the United States Forest Service. The listing includes three contributing buildings on a 1.9-acre (0.77 ha) parcel. Historically the Work Center has been used as a single dwelling and a warehouse.

== See also ==
- National Register of Historic Places listings in Hood River County, Oregon
