= Breitenbush Guard Station =

- Formerly listed on the U.S. National Register of Historic Places
- Location within Oregon Location within the United States
- Location: Willamette National Forest, Detroit, Oregon
- Coordinates: 44°46′54″N 121°57′59″W
- Area: 2.9 acres (1.2 ha)
- Built: 1935
- Architect: USDA Forest Service
- Architectural style: Rustic
- MPS: Depression-Era Buildings TR
- NRHP reference No.: 86000843

Significant dates
- Added to NRHP: April 8, 1986
- Removed from NRHP: February 7, 2011

The Breitenbush Guard Station in Willamette National Forest, near Detroit, Oregon was designed by architects of the United States Forest Service and was built by the Civilian Conservation Corps in 1935.

It was listed on the National Register of Historic Places in 1986 for its Rustic architecture, as part of a multiple property listing of Depression Era works of the U.S. Forest Service in Oregon and Washington. Its nomination asserts:

The Breitenbush Guard Station exemplifies the rustic architectural idiom developed

by the Forest Service, Pacific Northwest Region, to impart Forest Service identity and to represent its purposes and ideals; and signifies the agency's particular interpretation of a singular expression of early twentieth century

American architectural thought.

The nomination continues to assert that the station is an "outstanding example of an architectural locution invested with special aesthetic and associative values by the agency that created it."

The listing included two contributing buildings, a single dwelling and a secondary structure, on 2.9 acres (1.2 ha). The station building was an H-shaped, wood building on a concrete foundation, with a high gabled roof.

It was removed from the National Register in February 2011 after being destroyed by fire in 2000.
