= La Prele Work Center =

- U.S. National Register of Historic Places
- U.S. Historic district
- Location within Wyoming Location within the United States
- Nearest city: Douglas, Wyoming
- Coordinates: 42°27′29″N 105°50′2″W
- Area: 40 acres (16 ha)
- Built: 1937
- Architect: USDA Forest Service, Region 2
- Architectural style: USFS rustic architecture
- MPS: Depression-Era USDA Forest Service Administrative Complexes on Medicine Bow NF MPS
- NRHP reference No.: 94000272
- Added to NRHP: April 11, 1994

La Prele Work Center is a work center located in Medicine Bow National Forest near Douglas, Wyoming. The building was constructed from 1937 to 1941 by the Civilian Conservation Corps. The log building was designed by U.S. Forest Service architects in a rustic style distinct to the USFS. The building originally served as a ranger station for the La Prele Ranger District and was called the Cold Springs Ranger Station. In 1941, the station was renamed the La Prele Ranger Station. The building served as a ranger station until the La Prele district was consolidated in 1956; it is now a work center for U.S. Forest Service work crews.

The building was added to the National Register of Historic Places in 1994. The NRHP listing included three contributing buildings in 40 acres (16 ha).
