= Olympus Guard Station =

- U.S. National Register of Historic Places
- U.S. Historic district
- Location within Washington (state) Location within the United States
- Nearest city: Port Angeles, Washington
- Coordinates: 47°52′35″N 123°45′52″W
- Area: 2 acres (0.81 ha)
- Built: c. 1935
- Built by: U.S. Forest Service
- Architect: U.S. Forest Service
- Architectural style: Rustic
- MPS: Olympic National Park MPS
- NRHP reference No.: 07000722
- Added to NRHP: November 5, 2007

The Olympus Guard Station near Port Angeles, Washington was built in 1930s. It was built by the U.S. Forest Service and was designed by architects of the U.S. Forest Service. It is located about nine miles backcountry, within what is now the National Park Service-administered Olympic National Park.

It was listed on the National Register of Historic Places in 2007. It has also been known as OGS and as Olympus Guard Station Historic District. The NRHP listing included five contributing structures and one contributing building on 2 acres (0.81 ha).
