= Pleasant Valley Ranger Station =

- U.S. National Register of Historic Places
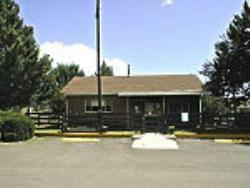
- Pleasant Valley Ranger Station

- Location within Arizona Location within the United States
- Nearest city: Young, Arizona
- Coordinates: 34°6′53″N 110°56′27″W
- Area: 2 acres (0.81 ha)
- Built: 1919
- Architect: USDA Forest Service; Civilian Conservation Corps
- Architectural style: Bungalow/Craftsman
- MPS: Depression-Era USDA Forest Service Administrative Complexes in Arizona MPS
- NRHP reference No.: 93000527
- Added to NRHP: June 10, 1993

The Pleasant Valley Ranger Station, known also as Pleasant Valley Administrative Site and Young Ranger Station, in Tonto National Forest near Young, Arizona was built in 1919. It was listed on the National Register of Historic Places in 1993 for its architecture.

It was designed by architects of the United States Forest Service, who employed Bungalow/Craftsman style. The NRHP listing included five contributing buildings and two contributing structures, which served as institutional housing and government office space, on 2 acres (0.81 ha).

It also has association with the Civilian Conservation Corps.
