= Globe Ranger Station =

- Pinal Ranger Station
- U.S. National Register of Historic Places
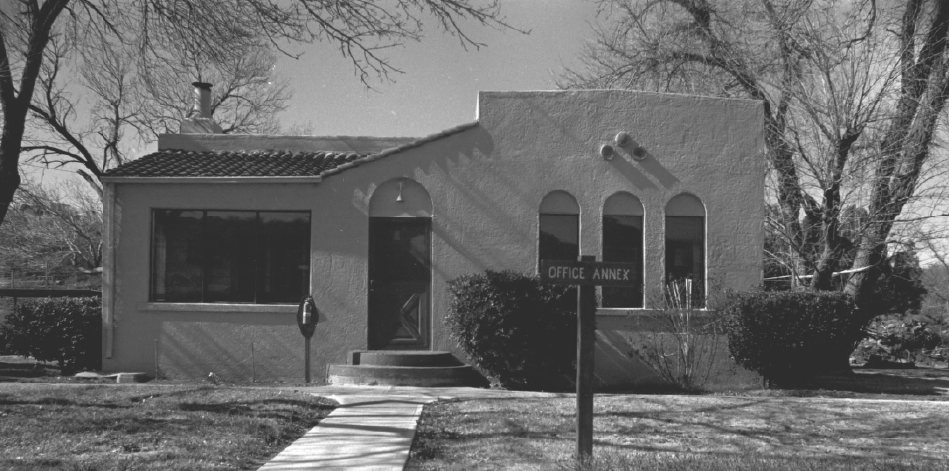
- Pinal Ranger Station, 1989

- Location within Arizona Location within the United States
- Nearest city: Globe, Arizona
- Coordinates: 33°22′40″N 110°46′13″W
- Area: 5 acres (2.0 ha)
- Built: 1934
- Architect: USDA Forest Service
- Architectural style: Spanish Colonial Revival
- MPS: Depression-Era USDA Forest Service Administrative Complexes in Arizona MPS
- NRHP reference No.: 93000526
- Added to NRHP: June 10, 1993

The Globe Ranger Station is the principal office of the Globe Ranger District of the Tonto National Forest in Arizona, United States. It is located 2 miles (3.2 km) south of downtown Globe, Arizona.

The property is listed on the National Register of Historic Places as the Pinal Ranger Station, built in 1934 by the Civilian Conservation Corps. It was listed on the National Register in 1993 for its Spanish style architecture and its role in the U.S. Forest Service's response to the Great Depression. It was designed by architects of the USDA Forest Service. The listing included three contributing buildings on 5 acres (2.0 ha) which served as institutional housing and government office space.

The Globe Ranger District, which is located north, south, and west of the city of Globe, has an area of approximately 450,000 acres (182,000 ha). Vegetation types include desert, chaparral, and pinyon-juniper.

The Globe Ranger Station is the home base for the Globe Hotshots, an interagency hotshot fire suppression crew.
