= Walnut Creek Ranger Station =

- U.S. National Register of Historic Places
- Location within Arizona Location within the United States
- Nearest city: Prescott, Arizona
- Coordinates: 34°55′28″N 112°50′24″W
- Area: 5 acres (2.0 ha)
- Built: 1931
- Architect: USDA Forest Service
- Architectural style: Bungalow/Craftsman
- MPS: Depression-Era USDA Forest Service Administrative Complexes in Arizona MPS
- NRHP reference No.: 93000524
- Added to NRHP: June 10, 1993

Walnut Creek Ranger Station, also known as Walnut Creek Work Center, in Prescott National Forest near Prescott, Arizona was built in 1931 by the Civilian Conservation Corps. It was listed on the National Register of Historic Places in 1993 for its architecture, which is Bungalow/Craftsman style. It was designed by architects of the United States Forest Service. It served historically as institutional housing and as government office space. The NRHP listing included two contributing buildings on a 5-acre (2.0 ha) area.

Its residence is built to standard plan A-5 with some modifications. A-5 would be a four-room bungalow with a side-gabled roof with a dormer; the dormer was omitted here. It includes the two porches that are standard features. The barn/garage/shop was built to standard plan C-10.
