= Lost Horse Fireman's Cabin =

- U.S. National Register of Historic Places
- Location within Montana Location within the United States
- Location: Off Lost Horse Rd. near Bear Creek Pass, Ravalli County, Montana
- Coordinates: 46°07′50″N 114°29′33″W
- Area: 0.5 acres (0.20 ha)
- Built: 1938
- Architect: US Forest Service, Clyde Fickes
- Architectural style: Log cabin
- NRHP reference No.: 88003437
- Added to NRHP: April 17, 1989

Lost Horse Fireman's Cabin, in the vicinity of Darby, Montana, was built in 1938. It was listed on the National Register of Historic Places in 1989.

It a log cabin which was built by the U.S. Forest Service.

"The design of the cabin was from a standard Region 1 plan, except for the drive through porch, developed by Clyde Fickes."
