= Rustler Park Fire Guard Station =

- U.S. National Register of Historic Places
- Location within Arizona Location within the United States
- Nearest city: Douglas, Arizona
- Coordinates: 31°54′10″N 109°16′41″W
- Area: 3 acres (1.2 ha)
- Built: 1934–35
- Architect: USDA Forest Service
- Architectural style: Vernacular, log
- MPS: Depression-Era USDA Forest Service Administrative Complexes in Arizona MPS
- NRHP reference No.: 93000518
- Added to NRHP: June 10, 1993

Rustler Park Fire Guard Station in the Chiracahua Mountains, near the area of Douglas, Arizona was built in 1934–35 by the Civilian Conservation Corps. It was listed on the National Register of Historic Places in 1993 for its architecture, which is vernacular and other log construction. It was designed by USDA Forest Service architects and served as institutional housing. The listing includes four contributing buildings (a log cabin, a bunkhouse, a barn and a store room) on 3 acres (1.2 ha).
