= Keplar B. Johnson =

American architect (1896–1972)

Keplar Barth Johnson (November 12, 1896 – February 8, 1972) was an American architect and a member of the American Institute of Architects. From 1937 to 1962, he was the Region 5 Architect for the U.S. Forest Service.

== Early life ==
Johnson was born in November 1896 at Montrose, Colorado. His father, Walter Henry Johnson, was an Iowa native and a bank clerk. His mother Annie Johnson was an immigrant from England. At the time of the 1900 United States census, Johnson was living with his family in Denver, Colorado.

He moved with his family to North Yakima, Washington, as a boy. He began his architectural studies at State College of Washington. Keplar subsequently studied architecture at the University of California where he was the vice president of the Architectural Association and a member of Tau Beta Pi. His classmates in the architectural program included William Wurster and Julia Morgan.

== Architecture ==
After graduating from Cal, Johnson moved to Seattle, Washington, where he worked for Schack, Young and Myers, Architects, from 1922 to 1930. From 1932 to 1934, he was the principal of Keplar B. Johnson, Architect, in Seattle. He was a member of the American Institute of Architects (AIA) from 1929 to 1935 and from 1951 until his death.

In the 1930s, Johnson began working as an architect for the U.S. Forest Service. He served as the Region 5 Architect for the Forest Service for 25 years from 1937 to 1952. From 1937 to 1942, Johnson was based in San Francisco. As of April 1942, he was living in Oakland, California. He was working for the U.S. Forest Service at the Phelan Building in San Francisco. While based in San Francisco, Johnson's designs included the following:

- A supervisor's office in Nevada City, California, designed in an Art Deco style.
- Adobe buildings for a research station north of Fresno, California.
- Office and laboratory buildings designed in a New England style at the Institute of Forest Genetics in Placerville, California.

In early 1942, Keplar was assigned to assist in designing a headquarters for a wartime project known as the guayule rubber project. The project headquarters was in Salinas, California. The Pacific War ended before the guayule project was completed, and the project was abandoned.

In 1943, Johnson moved to Los Angeles, California. His significant designs during his time in Southern California include the following:

- In approximately 1945, Johnson designed an experimental lookout tower on La Cumbre Peak in the Los Padres National Forest. In "A History of the Architecture of the USDA Forest Service," the Forest Service described Johnson's lookout as follows: "The lookout was innovative, with a steel frame cab, columns, roof beams, ties, and girders. It also had sloped windows similar to those on airport control towers. The project was funded jointly by the Washington Office and Region 5. Compared with other lookouts, La Cumbre Peak was somewhat expensive, costing $6,500. With the loss of the CCC and lean budgets after the war, funding for similar projects was rare."
- After World War II, Johnson was credited with introducing "modern and contemporary into new administrative structures," including the Goose Valley Station, built at Ramona, California, in 1963.

In November 1945, Johnson designed a new supervisor's office for the Tahoe National Forest, but it was never constructed." One of Johnson's subordinates from the late 1950s recalled that, in his later years, Johnson spent much of his time "checking plans, discussing designs, and brooding about what his career might have been had he not been called to the guayule rubber project."

Johnson retired from the Forest Service in 1962. He died in February 1972 at age 75 in San Francisco.

== See also ==
- Architects of the United States Forest Service
