= Sycamore Ranger Station =

- U.S. National Register of Historic Places
- Location within Arizona Location within the United States
- Nearest city: Camp Verde, Arizona
- Coordinates: 34°21′7″N 111°58′8″W
- Area: 2.5 acres (1.0 ha)
- Built: 1940; 86 years ago
- Architect: USDA Forest Service; Civilian Conservation Corps
- Architectural style: Vernacular, national
- MPS: Depression-Era USDA Forest Service Administrative Complexes in Arizona MPS
- NRHP reference No.: 93000523
- Added to NRHP: June 10, 1993

Sycamore Ranger Station, also known as Sycamore Work Center and as Sycamore Administrative Site, in Prescott National Forest near Camp Verde, Arizona was built in 1940 by the Civilian Conservation Corps. It was listed on the National Register of Historic Places in 1993 for its architecture, which includes vernacular, national(?), and other styles. It was designed by architects of the United States Forest Service. It served historically as institutional housing and as government office space. The NRHP listing included two contributing buildings on 2.5 acres (1.0 ha).

The site was established as a ranger station in 1917, and is named for Sycamore Creek which flows westward to the Agua Fria. By the 1920s the site had an office, a dwelling, a barn and perhaps a chicken house. The CCC was asked to construct new facilities in the late 1930s or the 1940s, and it built a new dwelling and barn which survive today and a new office and shop/garage which do not survive.
