= Leavenworth Ranger Station =

- U.S. National Register of Historic Places
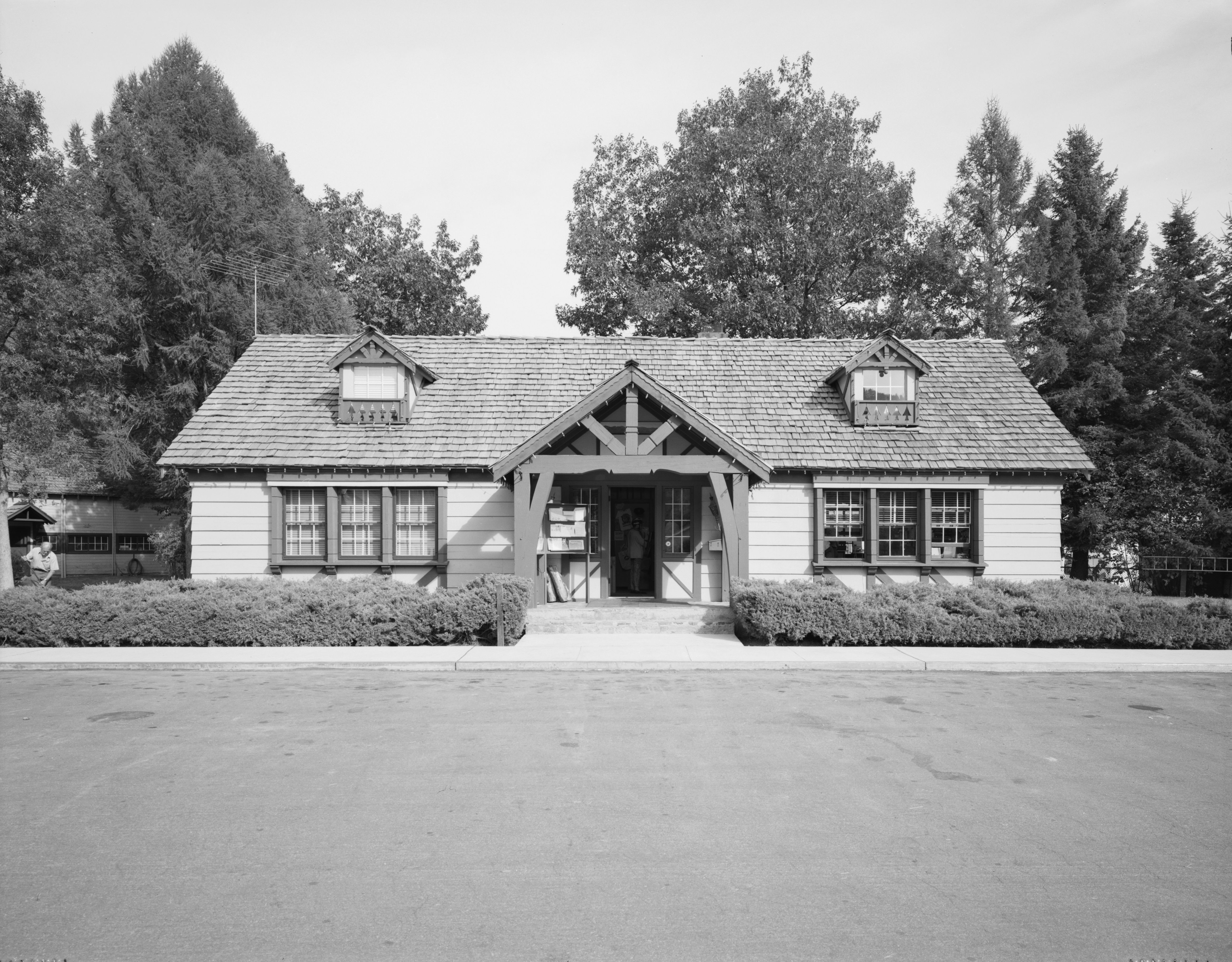

- Location within Washington (state)
- Location: 600 Sherbourne Street, Leavenworth, Washington
- Coordinates: 47°35′55″N 120°39′27″W
- Area: 9.9 acres (4.0 ha)
- Built: 1937-38
- Architect: USDA Forest Svce. Architecture Group
- Architectural style: Rustic
- MPS: Depression-Era Buildings TR
- NRHP reference No.: 86000840
- Added to NRHP: April 11, 1986

Leavenworth Ranger Station, also known as the Wenatchee River Ranger District, in Leavenworth, Washington was built during 1937-38 by the Civilian Conservation Corps. It was designed by the United States Forest Service's Region 6 USDA Forest Svce. Architecture Group in Rustic architecture. The listing includes nine contributing buildings on a 9.9-acre (4.0 ha) area.

It was listed on the National Register of Historic Places in 1986.

== Contributing Properties ==
The listing contains 9 contributing properties, built between 1937 and 1939:

- The Ranger Station Office, 47°35′56″N 120°39′27″W, built 1937-1938
- The Residence #1245, 47°35′53″N 120°39′35″W, built 1937-1938
- The Garage #1586, 47°35′54″N 120°39′35″W, built 1937-1938
- The Residence #1243, 47°35′58″N 120°39′27″W, built 1938-1939
- The Garage for Residence #1243, 47°35′58″N 120°39′27″W, built 1938-1939
- The Automotive Shop, 47°35′58″N 120°39′25″W
- The Equipment Storage Building, 47°35′58″N 120°39′23″W, built 1937-1938
- The Gas House, 47°35′57″N 120°39′24″W
- The Fire Warehouse, 47°35′56″N 120°39′29″W

== See also ==
- Leavenworth National Fish Hatchery, also NRHP-listed
