= Supervisor's House No. 1001 =

Historic house in Oregon, United States

- U.S. National Register of Historic Places
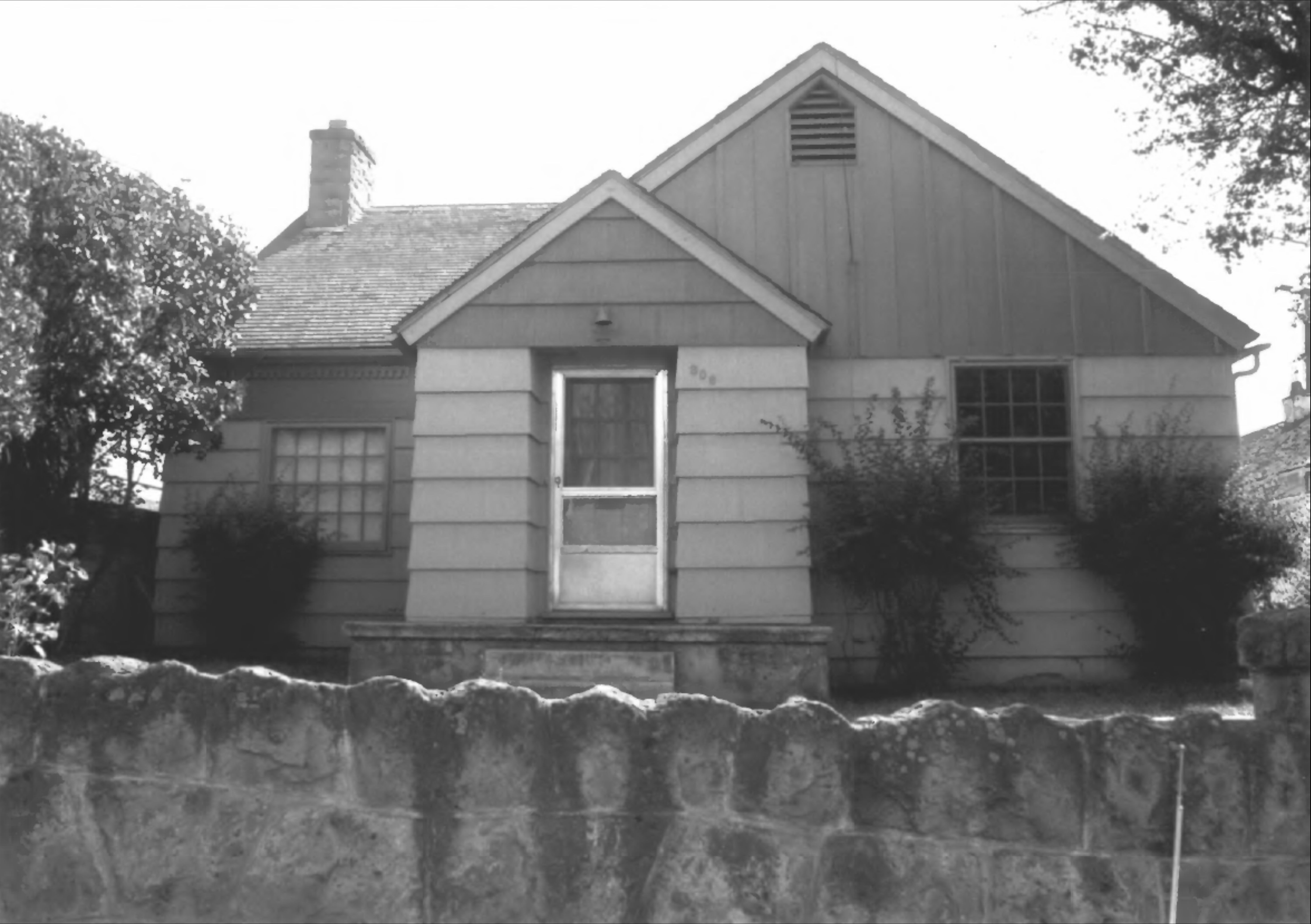

- Location within Oregon Location within the United States
- Location: Malheur National Forest, John Day, Oregon
- Coordinates: 44°24′57″N 118°57′00″W
- Area: 0.1 acres (0.040 ha)
- Built: 1938
- Built by: Civilian Conservation Corps
- Architect: USDA Forest Svce. Architecture Group
- Architectural style: Mixed (more Than 2 Styles From Different Periods), Rustic
- MPS: Depression-Era Buildings TR
- NRHP reference No.: 86000833
- Added to NRHP: April 11, 1986

The Supervisor's House No. 1001, located in Malheur National Forest in John Day, Oregon, was designed by architects of the United States Forest Service and was built by Civilian Conservation Corps labor in 1938. It was listed on the National Register of Historic Places in 1986. The listing included two contributing buildings, which are a 26-by-43-foot (7.9 m × 13.1 m) 1 1/2-story house and a detached one-car garage. Neither house nor garage has any significant decoration; both have shake exterior walls.

The property was deemed significant as a typical example of a Civilian Conservation Corps construction project that provided employment in emergency work-relief; it also "represents the Forest Service's presence in the locality, as part of the headquarters for field operation, and denotes, via the physical facilities required to carry out the agency's expanding responsibilities, the critical transition in the Service's development from custodial superintendence to extensive resource management." Further it was an example of Rustic architecture style developed by the Region 6 architects of the Forest Service.
