= Sedona Ranger Station =

- U.S. National Register of Historic Places
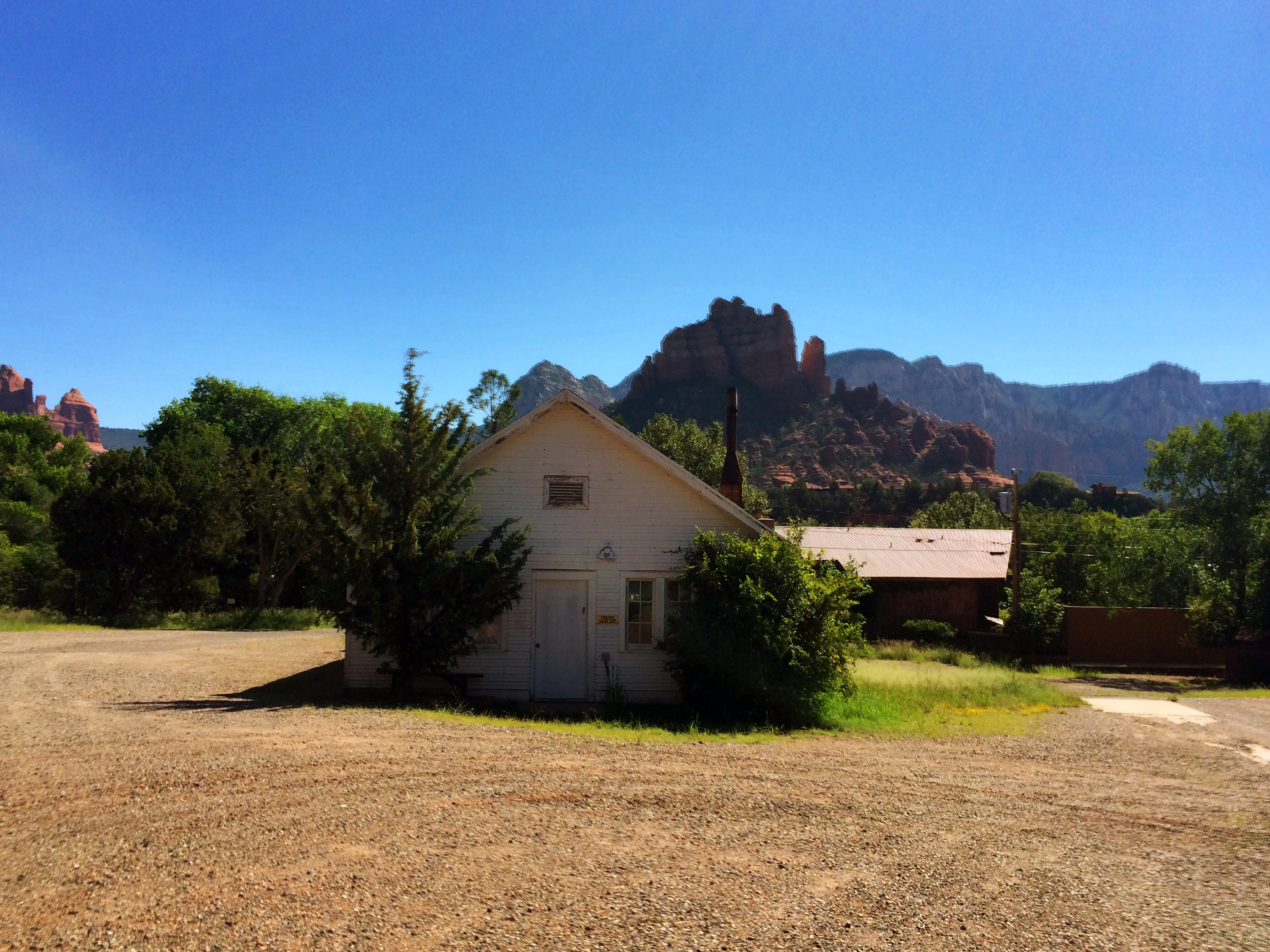
- The front of the building

- Location within Arizona Location within the United States
- Location: Brewer Rd. S. of Hart Rd., Sedona, Arizona
- Coordinates: 34°51′44.83″N 111°45′56.52″W
- Area: 3.5 acres (1.4 ha)
- Built: 1917
- Architect: USDA/USFS Standard Plans
- Architectural style: Bungalow/craftsman
- NRHP reference No.: 08000810
- Added to NRHP: August 29, 2008

The Sedona Ranger Station was built by the U.S. Forest Service in Sedona, Arizona in 1917 to administer the Red Rock Ranger District of Coconino National Forest. The ranger station complex includes a residence, a barn and a pump house. The house is a wood frame single story bungalow-style building on a sandstone foundation.

In the 1935 the Civilian Conservation Corps built the barn and pumphouse. The barn was built to USFS standard plan R-3-45A-7.

The property was sold before 2008 to private owners. It was placed on the National Register of Historic Places on August 29, 2008.

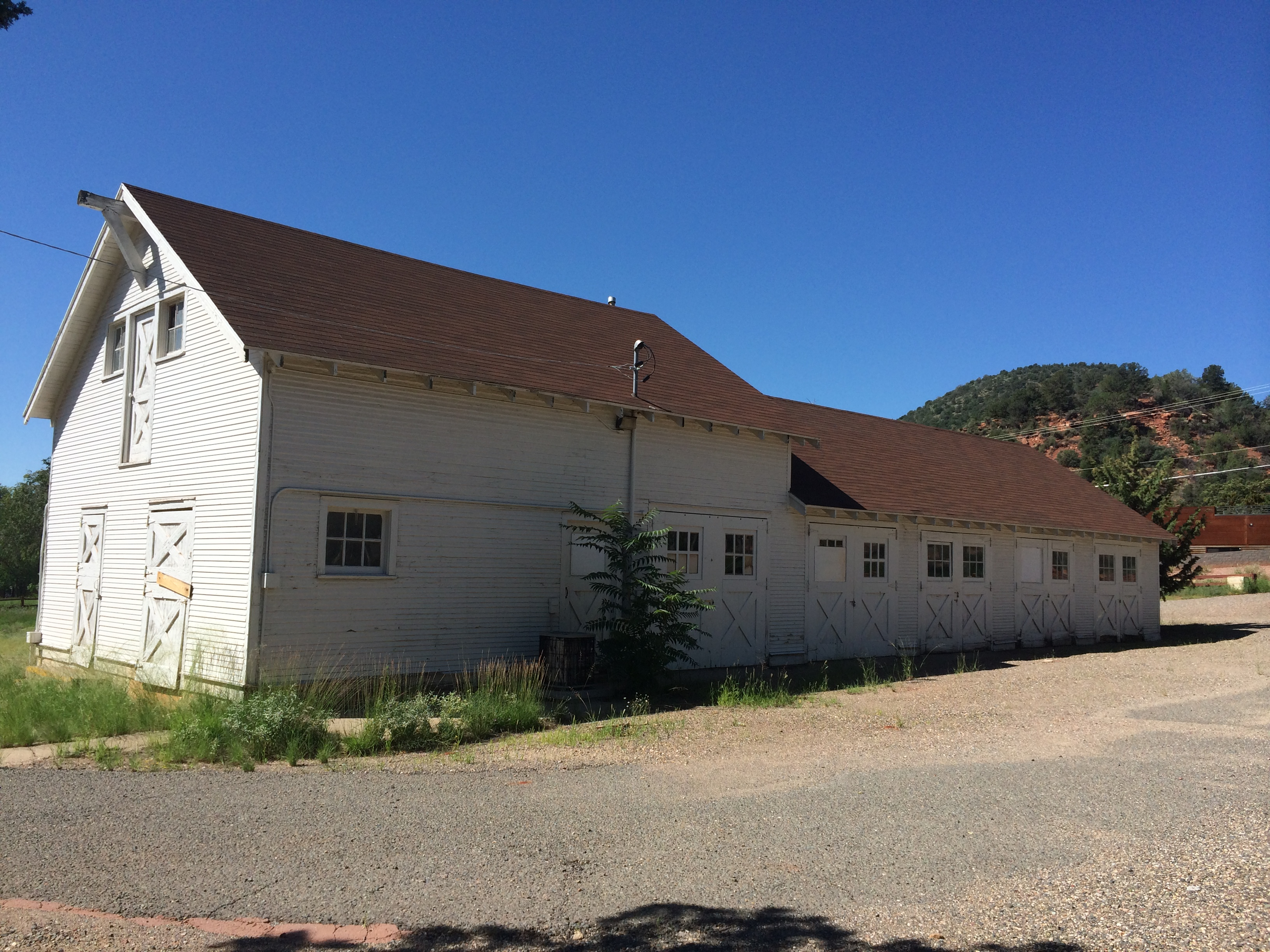
Rear of the building
