= Copper Creek Guard Station =

- U.S. National Register of Historic Places
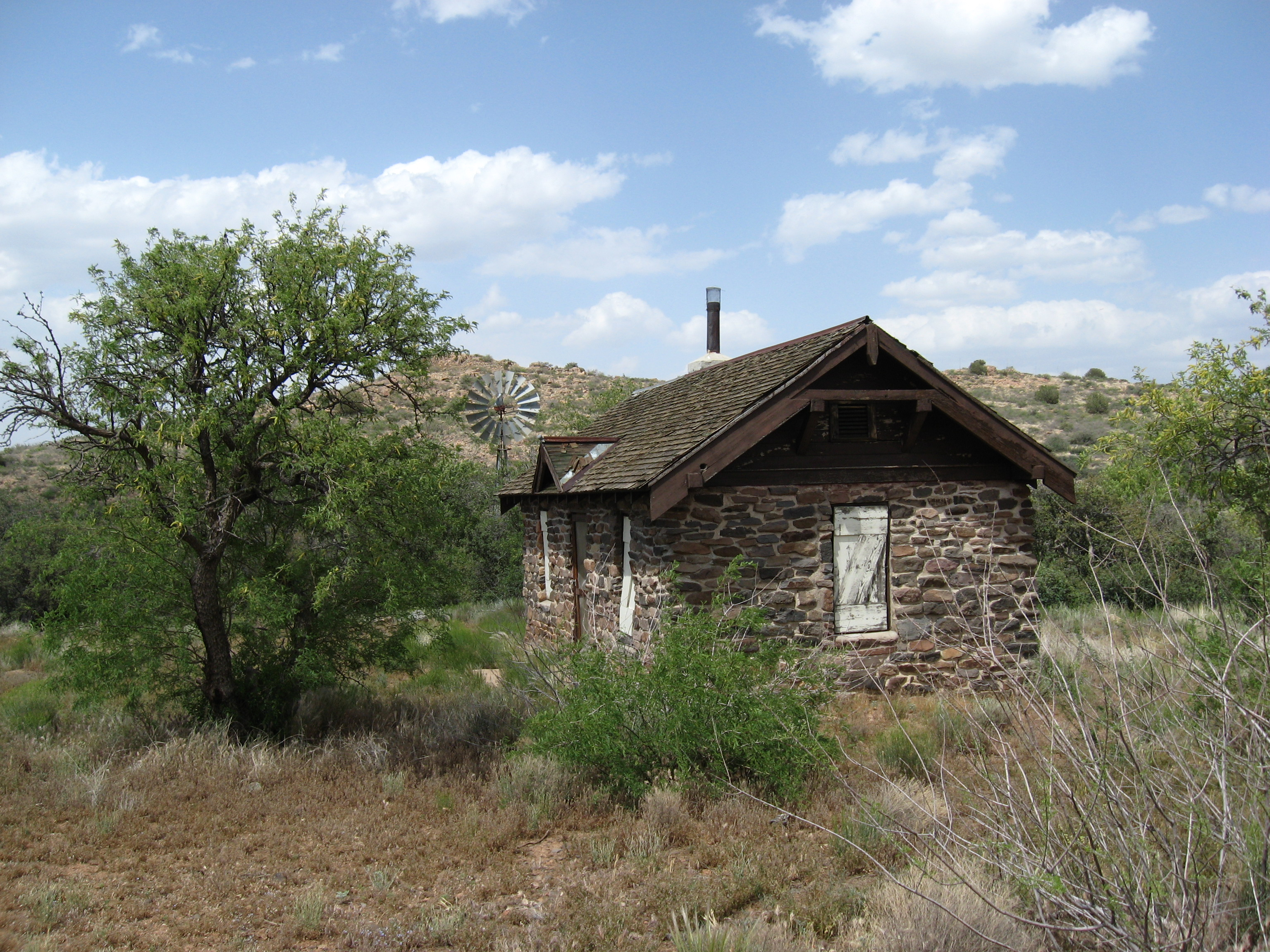
- Main building in 2008

- Location within Arizona Location within the United States
- Nearest city: Black Canyon City, Arizona
- Coordinates: 34°12′51″N 111°58′40″W
- Area: 4 acres (1.6 ha)
- Built: 1935
- Architect: USDA Forest Service; Civilian Conservation Corps
- Architectural style: Bungalow/Craftsman
- MPS: Depression-Era USDA Forest Service Administrative Complexes in Arizona MPS
- NRHP reference No.: 93000525
- Added to NRHP: June 10, 1993

The Copper Creek Guard Station was built by the Civilian Conservation Corps in 1935. It is located in a very remote area, near Black Canyon City, Arizona, United States. It was listed on the National Register of Historic Places in 1993 for its architecture. It was designed by the USDA Forest Service in Bungalow/Craftsman style. It served historically as a camp and as a government office. The NRHP listing included two contributing buildings on 4 acres (1.6 ha).

In the 1920s and 1930s, Forest Service employees often traveled many miles from local ranger stations to forest work sites. Since the forest road networks were not well developed, getting to a job site meant a long trek, carrying all the equipment needed to perform the fieldwork. This made it impractical for employees to make daily round trips. To facilitate work at remote sites, the Forest Service built guard stations at strategic locations throughout the forest to house fire patrols and project crews.

After World War II, the Forest Service greatly expanded its road network, allowing employees to get to most National Forest areas within a few hours. As a result, guard stations lost their utility. The Forest Service found new uses for some stations, but most were demolished or abandoned.

In the 1990s, historic preservation groups, with the support of Forest Service employees, began pressing National Forest managers to preserve the remaining structures. To finance the preservation effort, the Forest Service started renting its guard stations to the public. It later began renting out many unused fire lookout towers as well.

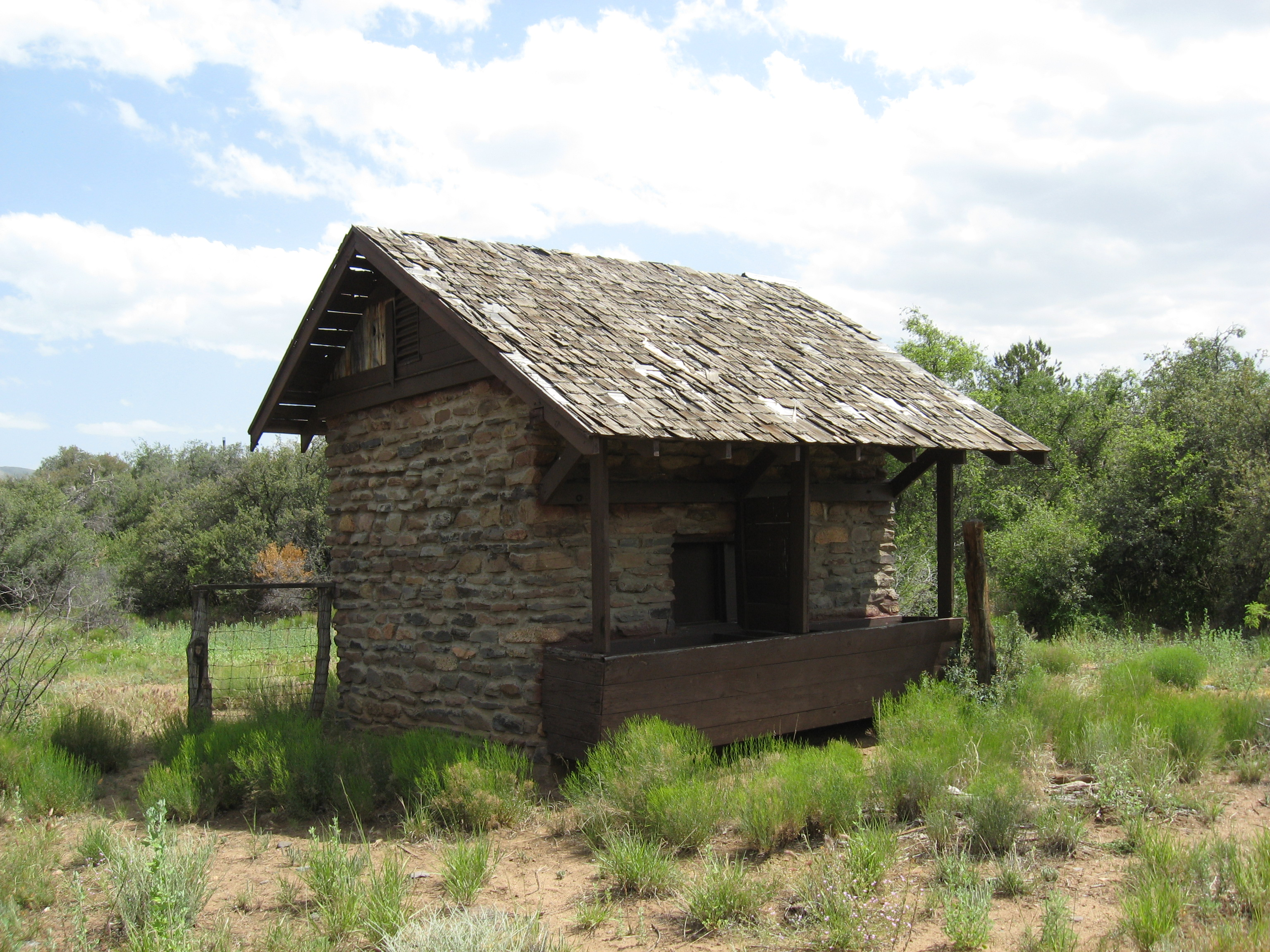
Outbuilding, in the draw below, in 2008

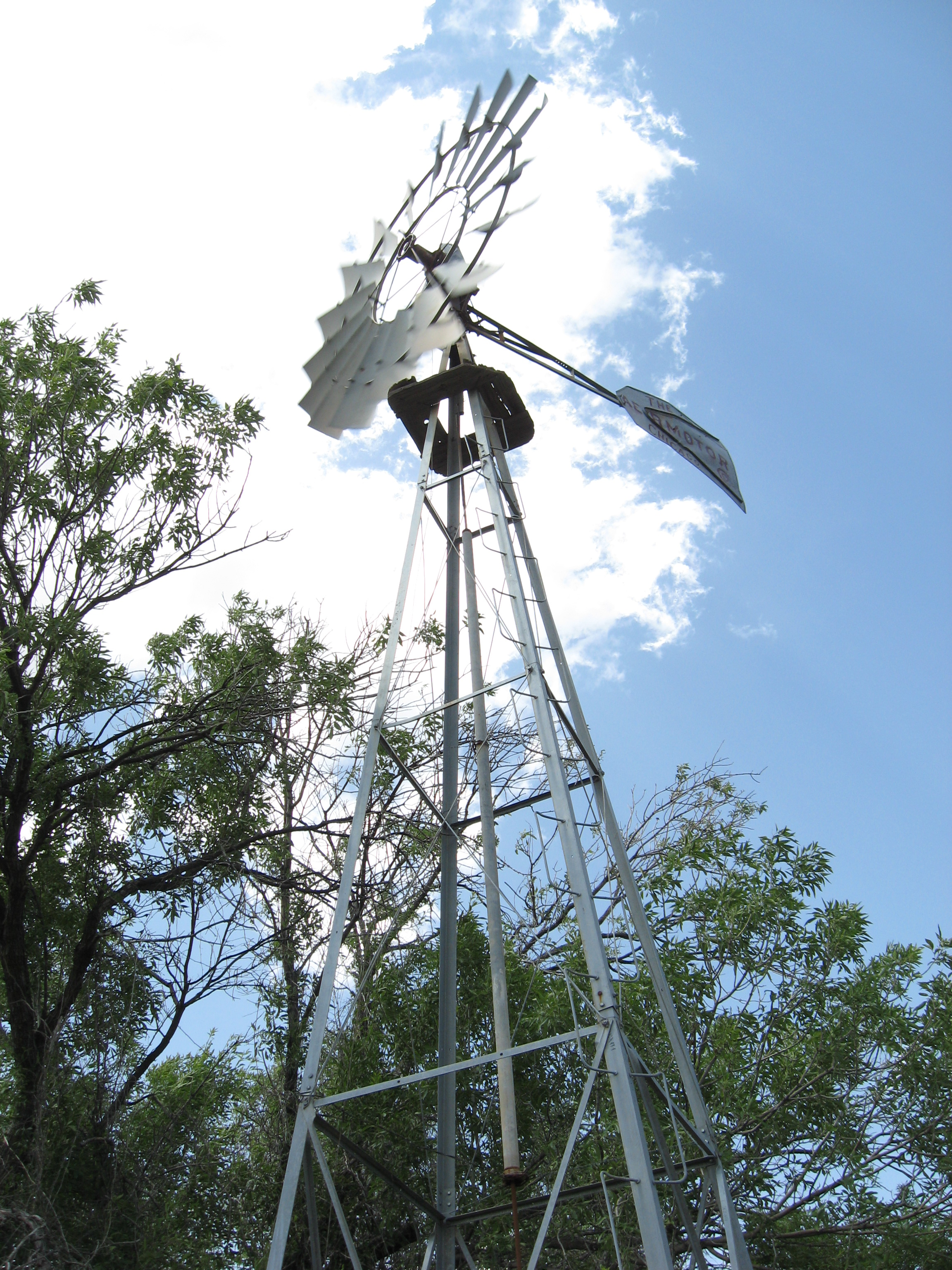
Aermotor wind pump, in draw below

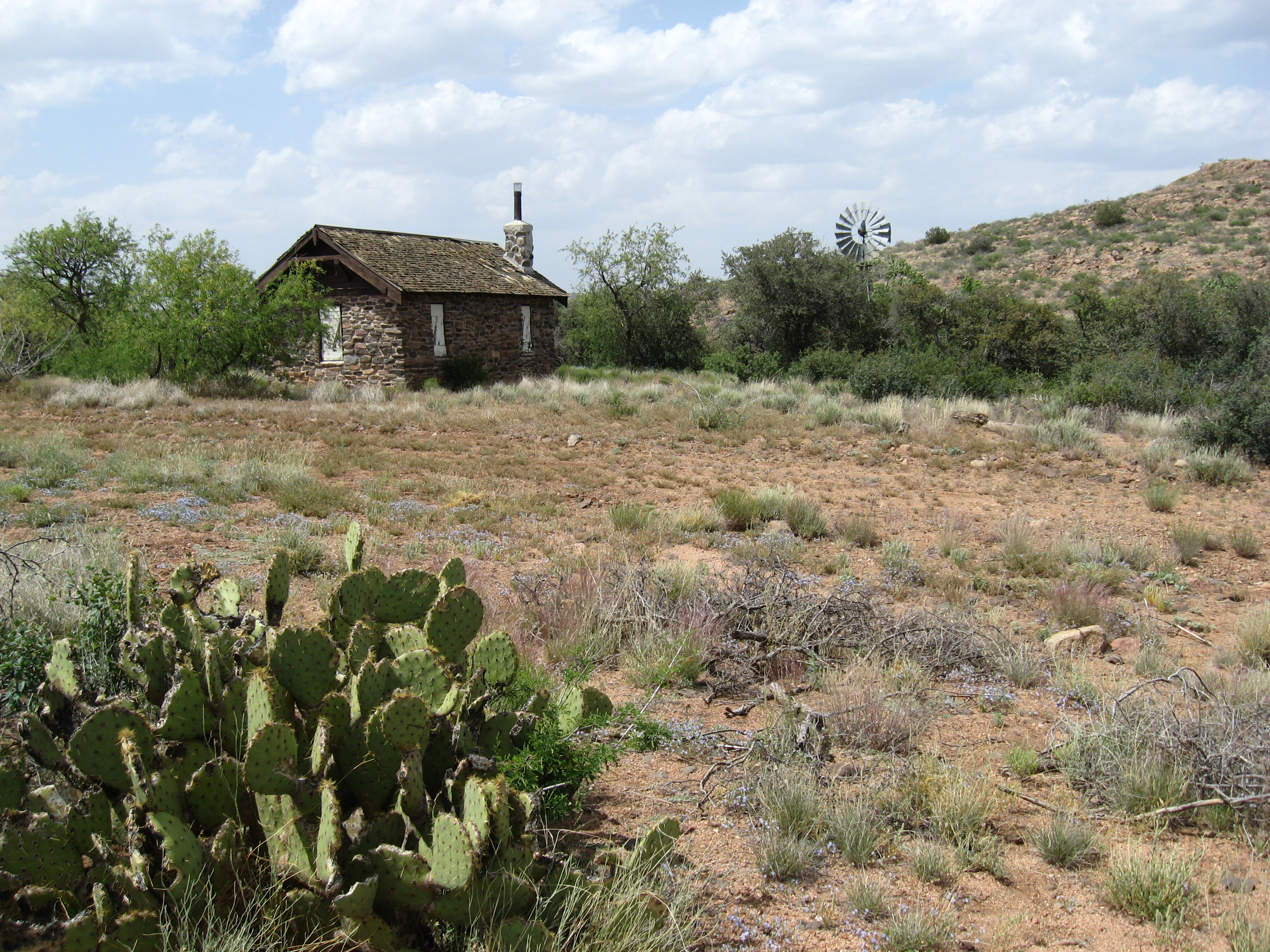
Perspective

Its Bungalow style was of the architecture adopted most widely by the USFS architects of the region.
