= Paradise Valley Ranger Station =

- U.S. National Register of Historic Places
- U.S. Historic district
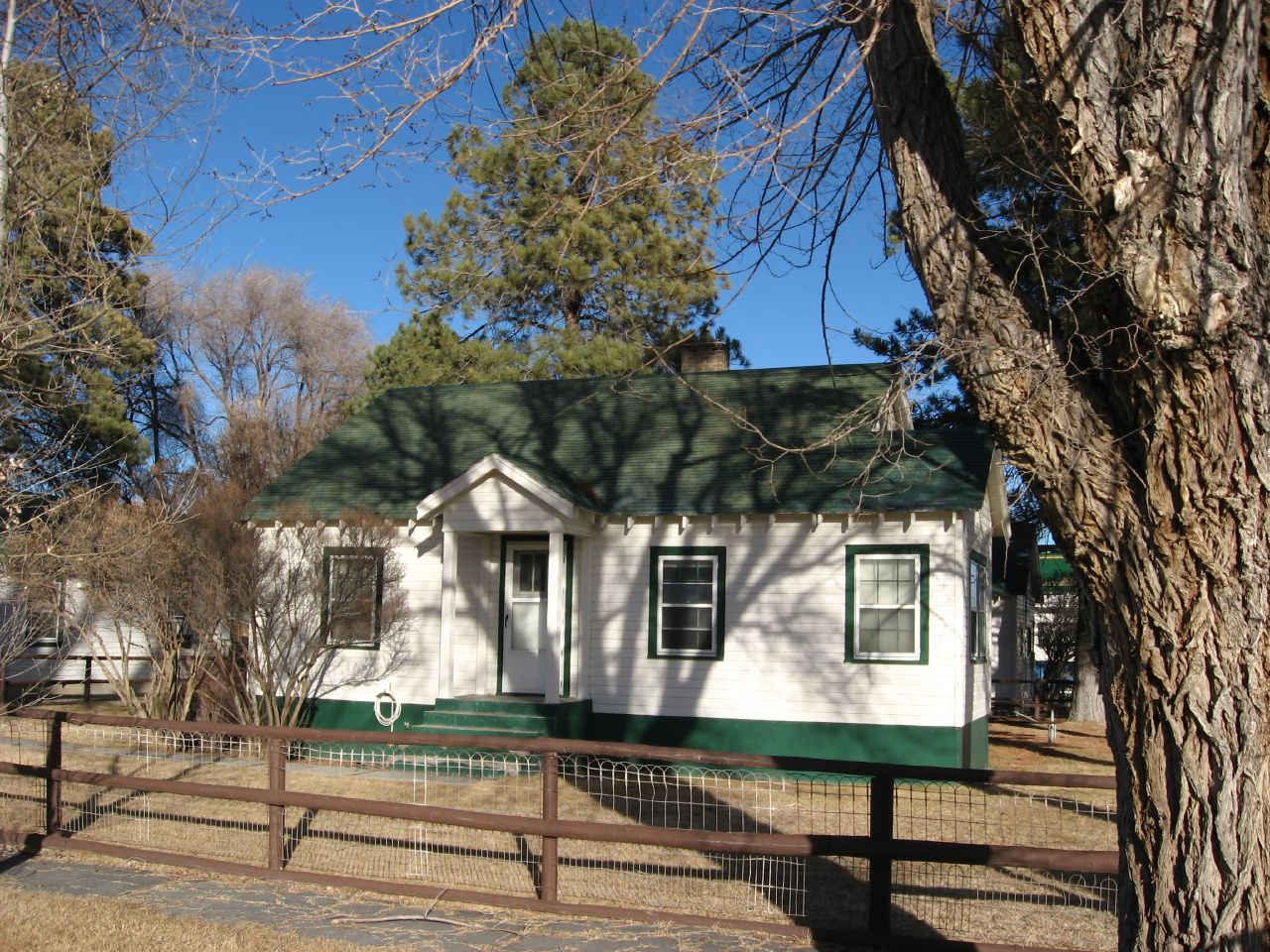
- The Paradise Valley Ranger Station in 2007

- Location within Nevada Location within the United States
- Location: 355 S. Main St., Humboldt-Toiyabe National Forest, Paradise Valley, Nevada
- Coordinates: 41°29′20″N 117°32′1″W
- Area: less than one acre
- Built: 1933
- Built by: Civilian Conservation Corps
- Architect: US Forest Service
- Architectural style: Bungalow/Craftsman
- NRHP reference No.: 96000662
- Added to NRHP: June 19, 1996

The Paradise Valley Ranger Station, also known as the Paradise Valley Guard Station, located at 355 S. Main St. in Paradise Valley, serves a district of the Humboldt-Toiyabe National Forest in Humboldt County, northwestern Nevada.

== History ==
The ranger station was built in 1933 in an American Craftsman Bungalow style. It was designed by the U.S. Forest Service architects and built by the Civilian Conservation Corps−CCC for the then named Humboldt National Forest].

The construction of the ranger station building started in 1934 by the Civilian Conservation Corps was halted for several years but the work was resumed and completed in 1941.

=== National Register of Historic Places ===
The building was deemed significant as a product of the National Forest Service's work with the Civilian Conservation Corps, a government jobs program of the Great Depression. It was listed on the National Register of Historic Places in 1996. The listing included seven contributing buildings and one other contributing structure.

== Present day ==
Currently, the station is run by the United States Forest Service for the Santa Rosa Range District of the Humboldt-Toiyabe National Forest, in Nevada.

== See also ==
- Civilian Conservation Corps in Nevada
- Ranger stations in the United States
