= Cima Park Fire Guard Station =

Historic place in Cochise County, Arizona

- U.S. National Register of Historic Places
- Location within Arizona Location within the United States
- Nearest city: Douglas, Arizona
- Coordinates: 31°51′41″N 109°16′55″W
- Area: 2 acres (8,100 m^{2})
- Built: 1934
- Architect: USDA Forest Service
- Architectural style: Vernacular, log
- MPS: Depression-Era USDA Forest Service Administrative Complexes in Arizona MPS
- NRHP reference No.: 93000514
- Added to NRHP: June 10, 1993

The Cima Park Fire Guard Station near Douglas, Arizona was built in 1934 by the Civilian Conservation Corps. It was listed on the National Register of Historic Places in 1993 for its architecture, which is "vernacular, log" architecture. It was designed by the USDA Forest Service and served as institutional housing. The listing included four contributing buildings (a cabin, a toolshed, an outhouse, and a barn) on a 2-acre (0.81 ha) area.

It is located on Greenhouse Trail in the Chiricahua Mountains. The station was built to serve as a headquarters camp for fire crews who could be dispatched to fight fires based upon telephone reports from fire lookouts. The telephone operator also was the cook.
