= Crown King Ranger Station =

- U.S. National Register of Historic Places
- Location within Arizona Location within the United States
- Nearest city: Crown King, Arizona
- Coordinates: 34°12′22″N 112°20′27″W
- Area: 1.5 acres (6,100 m^{2})
- Built: 1934
- Architect: USDA Forest Service; Civilian Conservation Corps
- Architectural style: Bungalow/craftsman
- MPS: Depression-Era USDA Forest Service Administrative Complexes in Arizona MPS
- NRHP reference No.: 93000522
- Added to NRHP: June 10, 1993

The Crown King Ranger Station is a ranger station near the top of Crown King Mountain in the area of Crown King, Arizona. It was built in 1934 by the Civilian Conservation Corps. Known also as Crown King Work Station or Crown King Administrative Site, it was listed on the National Register of Historic Places in 1993 for its architecture. It was designed by the USDA Forest Service in Bungalow/Craftsman style. It served as institutional housing and government office space. The NRHP listing included five contributing buildings on a 1.5-acre (6,100 m^{2}) area. The complex includes a residence, an office, a barn/garage/shop, a hay barn, and a well building.

The residence is an eight-room single-story building that is an application of standard dwelling plan A-17, a plan similar to standard plan A-3 but with a wider dinette/kitchen. It has a full basement.
