= Camp Clover Ranger Station =

- U.S. National Register of Historic Places
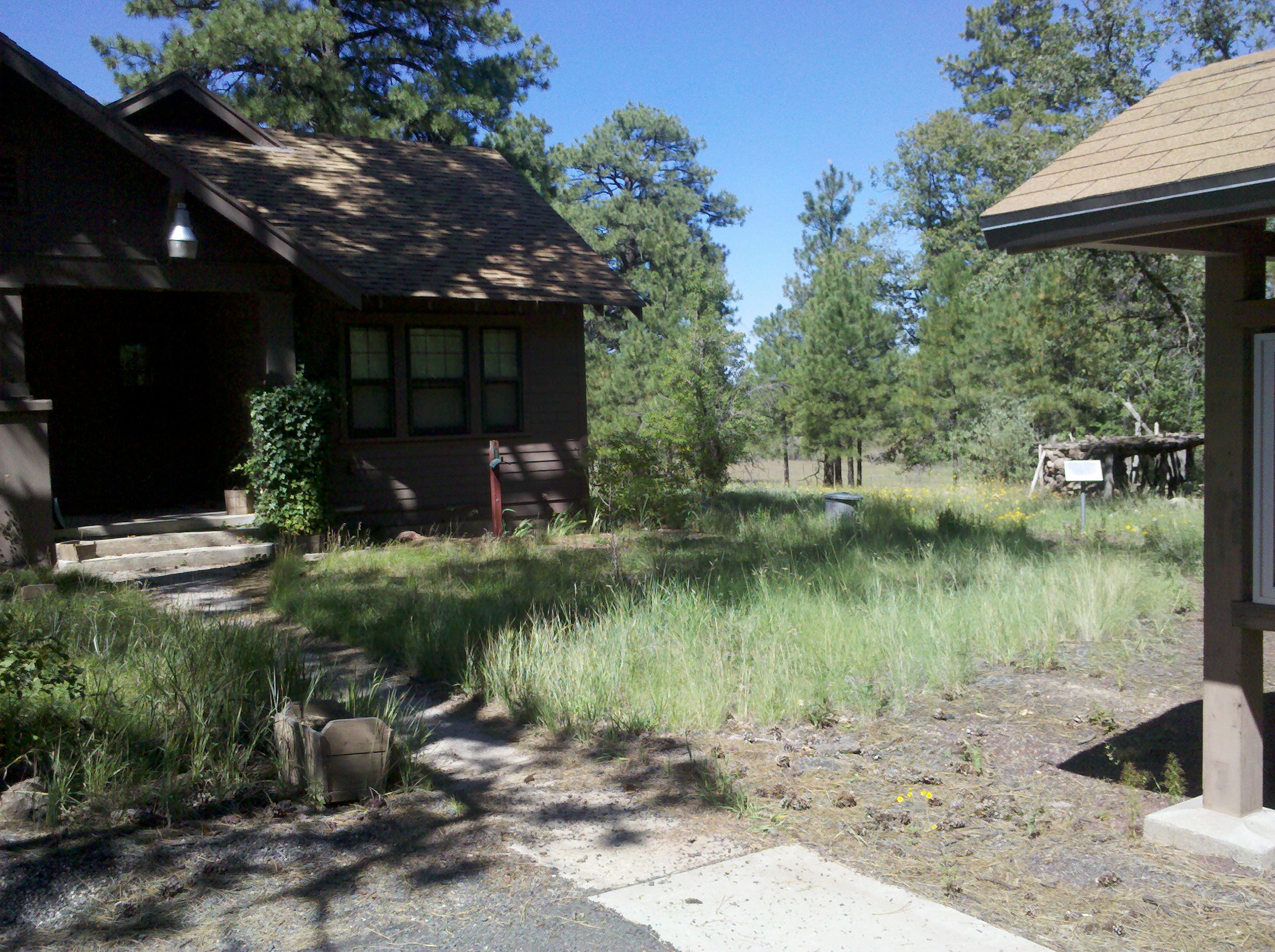

- Location within Arizona Location within the United States
- Nearest city: Williams, Arizona
- Coordinates: 35°14′13″N 112°13′8″W
- Area: 3 acres (1.2 ha)
- Built: 1934
- Architect: USDA Forest Service
- Architectural style: Bungalow/Craftsman
- MPS: Depression-Era USDA Forest Service Administrative Complexes in Arizona MPS
- NRHP reference No.: 93000520
- Added to NRHP: July 16, 1993

The Camp Clover Ranger Station, about two miles west of Williams, Arizona, was built in 1934 by the Civilian Conservation Corps. It was listed on the U.S. National Register of Historic Places in 1993 for its architecture. It was designed by the USDA Forest Service in Bungalow/Craftsman style. It served historically as institutional housing and government office space.

The listing included five contributing buildings (an office, a residence, a barn/garage, a shed, and a one-car garage), and one contributing structure (a corral) on 3 acres (1.2 ha).
