= Chatter Creek Guard Station =

- U.S. National Register of Historic Places
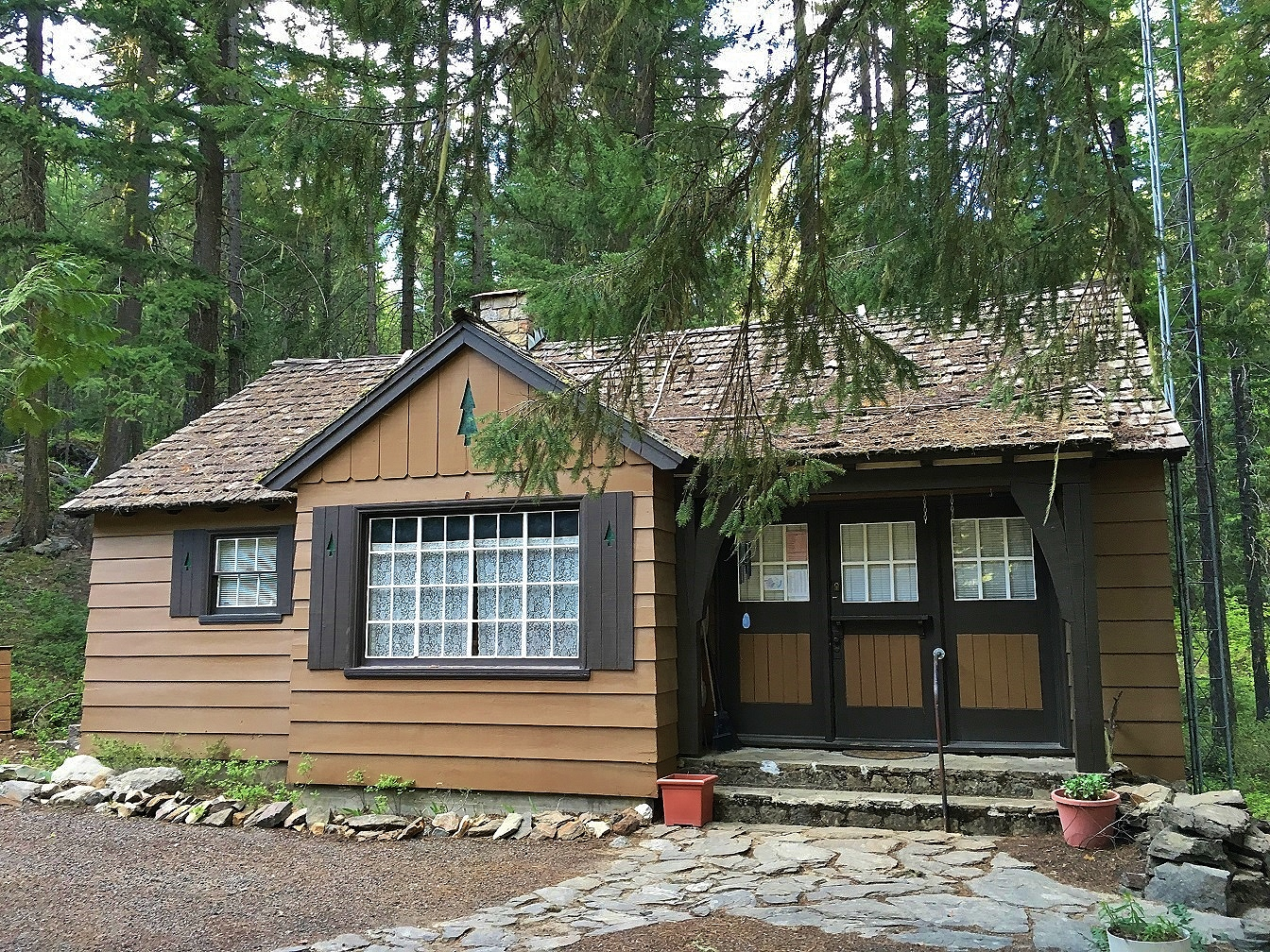

- Location within Washington (state)
- Location: Along Icicle Gorge Loop Trail, Wenatchee National Forest, about 10.5 miles (16.9 km) west of Leavenworth, Washington
- Nearest city: Leavenworth, Washington
- Coordinates: 47°36′27″N 120°53′04″W
- Area: 1.98 acres (0.80 ha)
- Architect: USDA Forest Service Architecture Group; Civilian Conservation Corps
- Architectural style: Rustic
- MPS: Depression-Era Buildings TR
- NRHP reference No.: 86000812
- Added to NRHP: April 8, 1986

The Chatter Creek Guard Station is a Rustic style set of buildings in Wenatchee National Forest, in Leavenworth, Washington. It was designed by the USDA Forest Service Architecture Group and built by the Civilian Conservation Corps. The listing includes three contributing buildings: (Note: While the NRHP registration form list this property as a district, it's apparently enlisted as a single building in the NRHP Asset Detail page)

- The Guard Station itself, 47°36′26″N 120°53′04″W
- The Packer's Cabin, 47°36′27″N 120°53′05″W
- The Barn, 47°36′28″N 120°53′04″W

It is located just off the Icicle Gorge loop trail (which partly runs along Icicle Creek) in the Wenatchee Mountains.
