= Arctic Point Fire Lookout =

- U.S. National Register of Historic Places
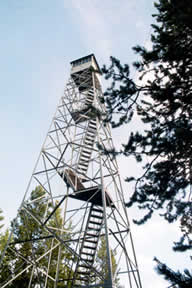

- Location within Idaho Location within the United States
- Nearest city: Big Creek, Idaho
- Coordinates: 45°28′28″N 115°2′16″W
- Area: less than one acre
- Built: 1936
- Architect: USDA Forest Service
- Architectural style: Rocky Mountain style
- NRHP reference No.: 94001019
- Added to NRHP: August 29, 1994

The Arctic Point Fire Lookout is a 72-foot (22 m) tall fire tower located near Big Creek, Idaho. It was listed on the U.S. National Register of Historic Places (NRHP) in 1994. Its NRHP listing included two contributing buildings, a log cabin residence and a standard type outhouse, as well as one contributing structure, the fire tower itself.

The tower was built in 1936. It is an Aermotor Company tower topped with a 7x7 foot (2.1x2.1 m) galvanized steel cab and is the last tower of its type still standing in a wilderness area. The cabin was added as a residence for the lookouts in 1939. It remained in use for its intended purpose until 1997, when it was decommissioned.
