= Big Creek Ranger Station Historic District =

Historic district in Montana, United States

- U.S. National Register of Historic Places
- Location within Montana Location within the United States
- Location: North Fork Rd. near Polebridge, Montana
- Coordinates: 48°36′06″N 114°09′58″W
- Area: 9,999 acres (4,046 ha)
- Architect: U.S. Forest Service architects
- NRHP reference No.: 14001126
- Added to NRHP: January 7, 2015

The Big Creek Ranger Station Historic District, located near Polebridge in Flathead National Forest in Flathead County, Montana, is a historic district which was listed on the National Register of Historic Places in 2015.

A news release stated the district was recognized "for its historical associations with the creation and administration of Flathead National Forest programs, and fire management in USFS Region One and the western United States. The property has added significance for the qualities of the buildings which reflect Craftsman influences combined with a rustic aesthetic, a typical format for USDA Forest Service buildings in the west and particularly Region One."
