= W. Ellis Groben =

American architect and writer

William Ellis Groben, usually known as W. Ellis Groben, was an American architect and writer.

Groben was Washington (D.C.) office architect of the U.S. Forest Service between 1933 and 1953 and provided professional guidance as the national consulting architect of the service, leading architectural-style development.

== Early life and education ==
Groben was "a native of" Philadelphia and studied architecture at the University of Pennsylvania in Philadelphia; and the Ecole des Beaux Arts.z He apprenticed in and near Philadelphia, and was hired as the chief architect for the city of Philadelphia.

== Career ==
Groben was an "outstanding architect" and also talented as an artist.

Groben wrote the 1940 document "Architectural Trend of Future Forest Service Buildings".

Groben designed the Forest Services' International Institute of Tropical Forestry building in Puerto Rico.

Groben designed three Pennsylvania movie theatres:

- Hiway Theatre, 212 Old York Road, Jenkintown, Pennsylvania 19046
- Carman Theatre, Germantown Avenue and Roy Street, Philadelphia, Pennsylvania 19140
- Oxford Theatre, 7209-7211 Rising Sun Avenue, Philadelphia, Pennsylvania 19111

In 1936, he designed the renovation of the Embassy Theatre, later known as the York Road Theatre.

== Works ==
Works include:

- Fickes, Clyde P. & Groben, W. Ellis (2005), Building with Logs & Log Cabin Construction, Almonte, Ontario: Algrove Publishing, ISBN 1-897030-22-3
- Groben, W. Ellis, Adobe Architecture:Its Design and Construction, Shorey Pubns
- Groben, W. Ellis, Camouflage for Forest Service structures

== See also ==
- Architects of the United States Forest Service
- List of American architects
- List of American writers
- List of people from Philadelphia
- List of University of Pennsylvania people
- List of people from Washington, D.C.
