= Brush Creek Work Center =

- U.S. National Register of Historic Places
- U.S. Historic district
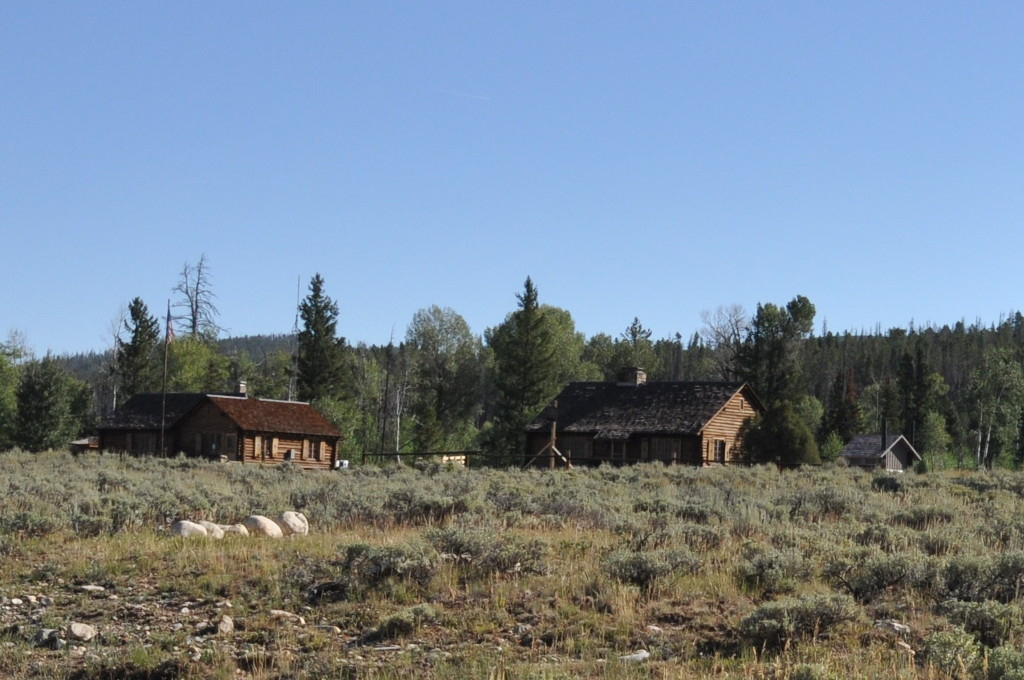

- Location within Wyoming Location within the United States
- Nearest city: Saratoga, Wyoming
- Coordinates: 41°20′45″N 106°32′14″W
- Area: 70 acres (28 ha)
- Built: 1937
- Built by: Civilian Conservation Corps
- Architect: USDA Forest Service, Region 2
- Architectural style: USFS rustic architecture
- MPS: Depression-Era USDA Forest Service Administrative Complexes on Medicine Bow NF MPS
- NRHP reference No.: 94000276
- Added to NRHP: April 11, 1994

The Brush Creek Work Center in Medicine Bow National Forest near Saratoga, Wyoming is a ranger station of the USDA Forest Service, Region 2 that was built during 1937-41, by the Ryan Park CCC Camp, and is listed on the National Register of Historic Places. It was designed by architects of the United States Forest Service in rustic style. The designs were applications of standard plans.

The site has three contributing buildings and five non-contributing ones, on an included area of 70 acres (28 ha). The contributing buildings are an office/residence, a residence, and a garage; the non-contributing ones include several sheds.

According to its nomination to the National Register:

The Brush Creek Work Center is significant ... for its association with expansion of Forest Service administration from custodial superintendence to active resource management. Built by the Civilian Conservation Corps, it reflects the contribution of this Federal Works program to the expansion of Forest Service resource management during the 1930s. It is also significant [architecturally] because it embodies a distinctive style of architecture developed by the Forest Service during the Depression-era. The use of standard plans was typical of remote Forest Service installations and the log building style conformed well with the forested surroundings. The buildings represent a distinctive Forest Service architectural design style and philosophy.

It was built by the Civilian Conservation Corps, with first logs cut in 1937 and completion in 1941.

The site is located in a valley of Barrett Creek and Brush Creek.

It was listed on the NRHP on April 11, 1994.
