= Early Winters Ranger Station Work Center =

- U.S. National Register of Historic Places
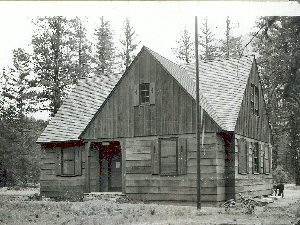

- Location within Washington (state)
- Nearest city: Winthrop, Washington
- Coordinates: 48°35′41″N 120°25′48″W
- Area: 9.9 acres (4.0 ha)
- Built: 1936
- Architect: USDA Forest Svce. Architecture Group
- Architectural style: Rustic
- MPS: Depression-Era Buildings TR
- NRHP reference No.: 86000841
- Added to NRHP: April 11, 1986

The Early Winters Ranger Station Work Center in the Okanogan–Wenatchee National Forest near Winthrop, Washington was built in 1936 by the Civilian Conservation Corps. It was listed on the National Register of Historic Places in 1986 for its architecture. It was designed by the Northwest Region 6 group of architects of the United States Forest Service, the USDA Forest Svce. Architecture Group. The listing included nine contributing buildings over a 9.9-acre (4.0 ha) area, reflecting Rustic architecture. Building functions included as single dwelling, secondary structure, government office, and warehouse.
