= Gold Beach Ranger Station =

- U.S. National Register of Historic Places
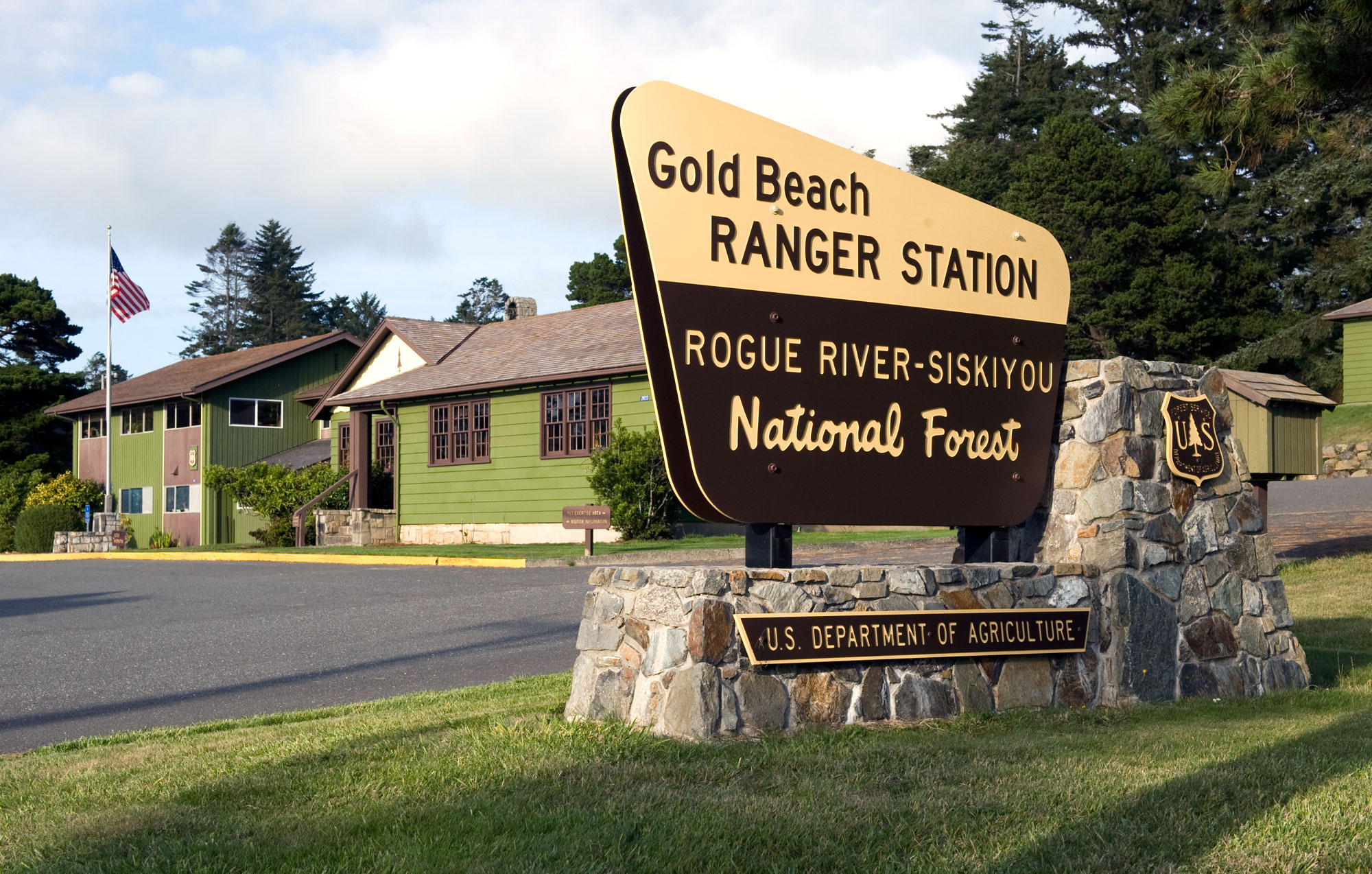

- Location within Oregon Location within the United States
- Location: Siskiyou National Forest, Gold Beach, Oregon
- Coordinates: 42°24′7″N 124°25′8″W
- Area: 5 acres (2.0 ha)
- Built: 1936
- Built by: Civilian Conservation Corps
- Architect: USDA Forest Svce. Architecture Group
- Architectural style: Rustic
- MPS: Depression-Era Buildings TR
- NRHP reference No.: 86000818
- Added to NRHP: April 8, 1986

The Gold Beach Ranger Station was built at Gold Beach, Oregon in Siskiyou National Forest (now Rogue River-Siskiyou National Forest) in 1936 by the Civilian Conservation Corps (CCC). The ranger station comprises several structures that typify the U.S. Forest Service's design style of the time.

The main structure is an 1196 square foot one-story frame office building set on a concrete foundation veneered with rubble stone. The gable features the USFS pine tree logo. The Ranger's Residence was also built in 1936 in a similar style, together with two smaller residences. A one-story crewhouse was built at the same time, together with a shop, warehouse and equipment shed. Some of the buildings feature custom-made hardware in a tree motif.

The Gold Beach Ranger Station was placed on the National Register of Historic Places on April 8, 1986. It is still the headquarters of the Gold Beach Ranger District.
