= Atlanta Ranger Station =

- Atlanta Ranger Station Historic District
- U.S. National Register of Historic Places
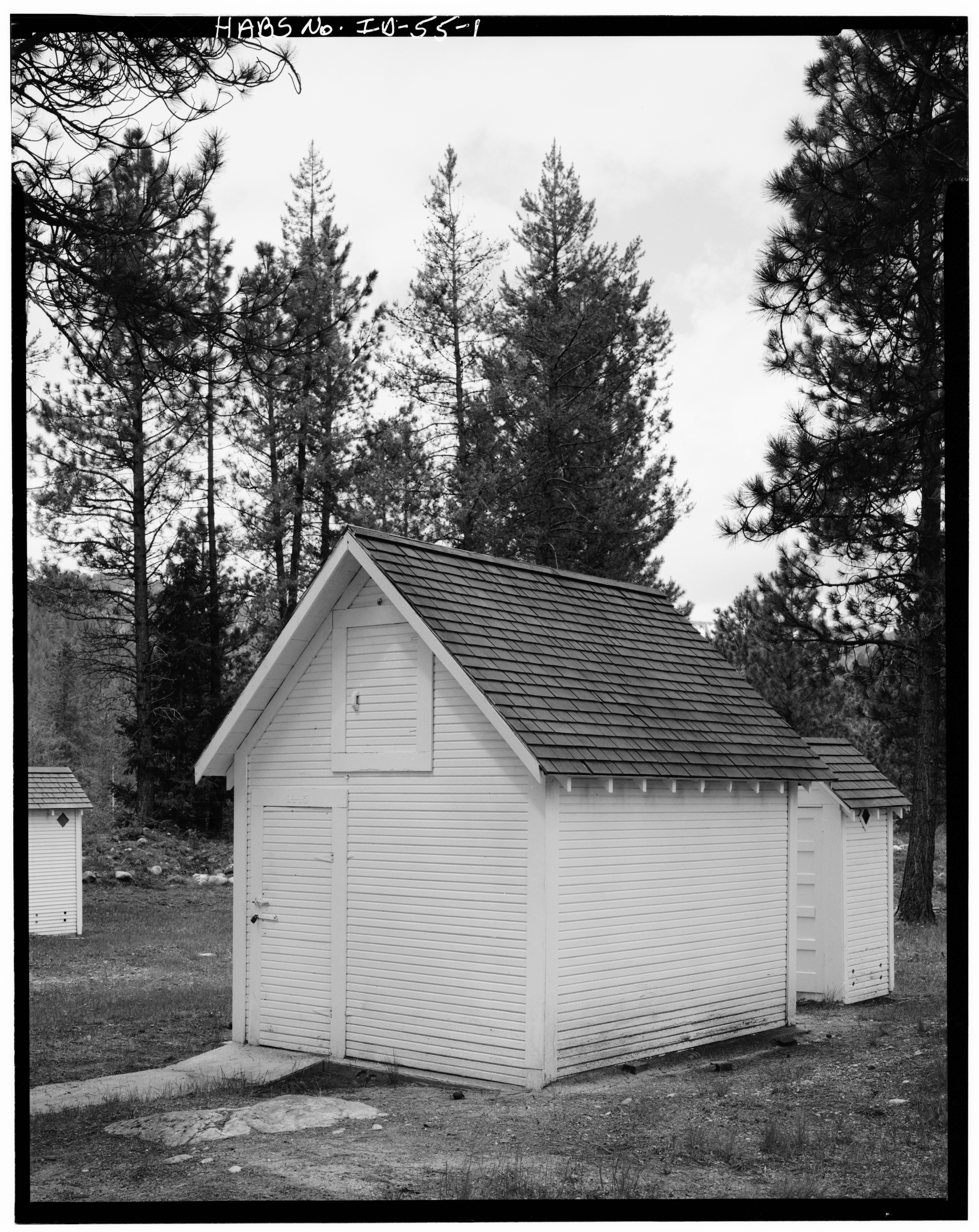
- Dutch Creek Work Station, Bunkhouse, Atlanta, Elmore County, ID

- Location within Idaho Location within the United States
- Location: Boise National Forest, Atlanta, Idaho
- Coordinates: 43°48′18″N 115°07′49″W
- Area: 24 acres (9.7 ha)
- Built: 1933
- Built by: Civilian Conservation Corps
- Architect: USDA Forest Service
- Architectural style: Forest Service R-4 Standard
- NRHP reference No.: 02001726
- Added to NRHP: January 23, 2003

The Atlanta Ranger Station, also known as Atlanta Guard Station, is a 24 acres (9.7 ha) historic district in Boise National Forest in Atlanta, Idaho that was listed on the National Register of Historic Places in 2003. It includes 10 contributing buildings dating as far back as 1933. The complex was built by the Civilian Conservation Corps and designed by the USDA Forest Service, and includes Forest Service R-4 Standard and other architecture. The listing included ten contributing buildings.

Its "Ranger's Dwelling" (Building No. 1101) was built in 1933 as a plan R4-7 guard station dwelling, but was destroyed by fire in 1936. It was replaced by an identical R4-7 in 1937, and modified in 1941.
