= Lost Lake Guard Station =

- U.S. National Register of Historic Places
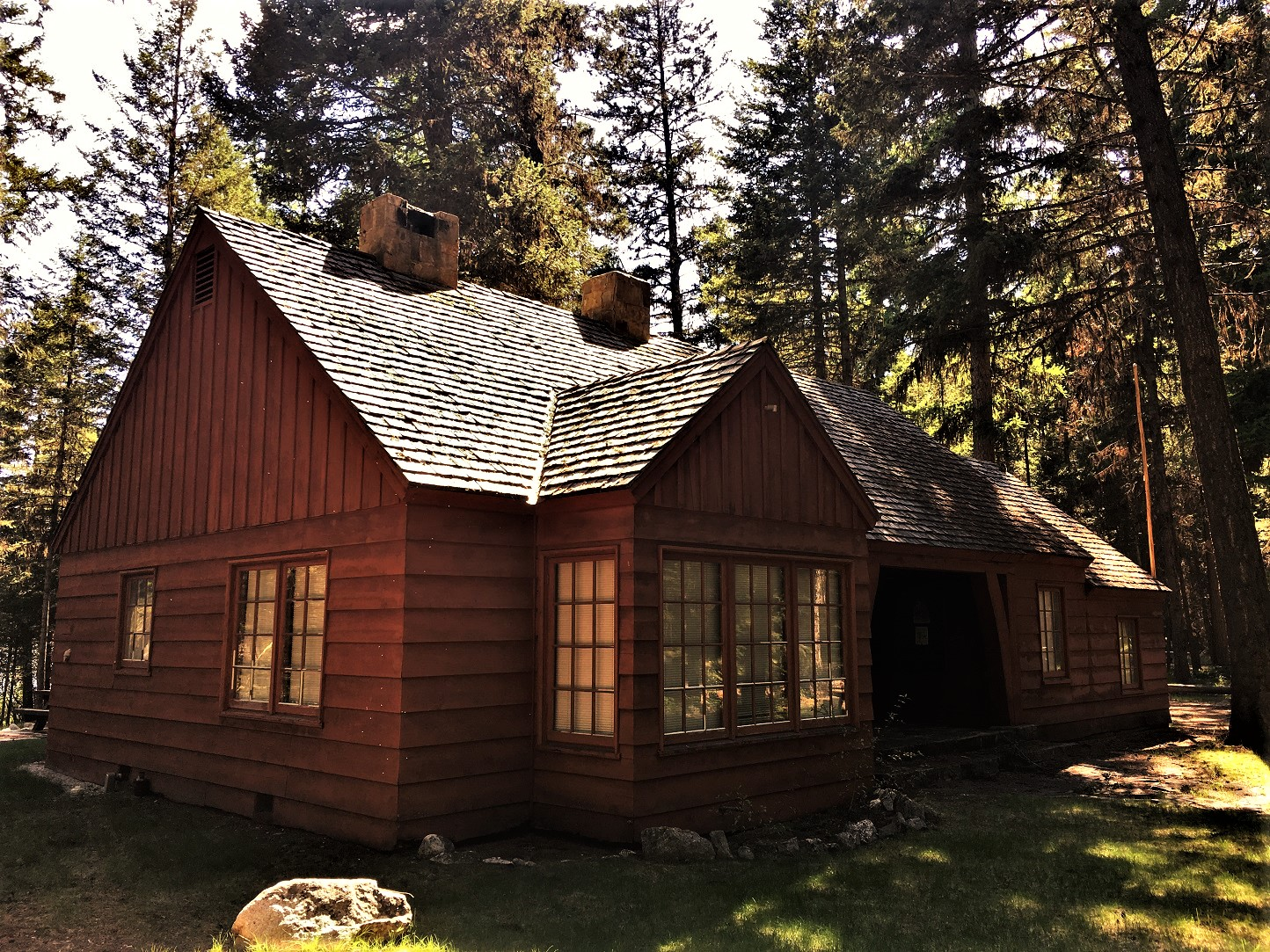
- Photographed in May 2017

- Location within Washington (state) Location within the United States
- Location: Okanogan National Forest, Tonasket, Washington
- Coordinates: 48°50′42″N 119°2′54″W
- Area: 1.3 acres (0.53 ha)
- Built: 1940
- Architect: USDA Forest Svce. Architecture Group; Civilian Conservation Corps
- Architectural style: Rustic
- MPS: Depression-Era Buildings TR
- NRHP reference No.: 86000814
- Added to NRHP: April 11, 1986

The Lost Lake Guard Station in Okanogan–Wenatchee National Forest near Tonasket, Washington was built in 1940 by the Civilian Conservation Corps. It was listed on the U.S. National Register of Historic Places on April 11, 1986. It was designed by the USDA Forest Svce. Architecture Group of the Pacific Northwest region in Rustic architecture. The listing included a 1.3-acre (0.53 ha) area.

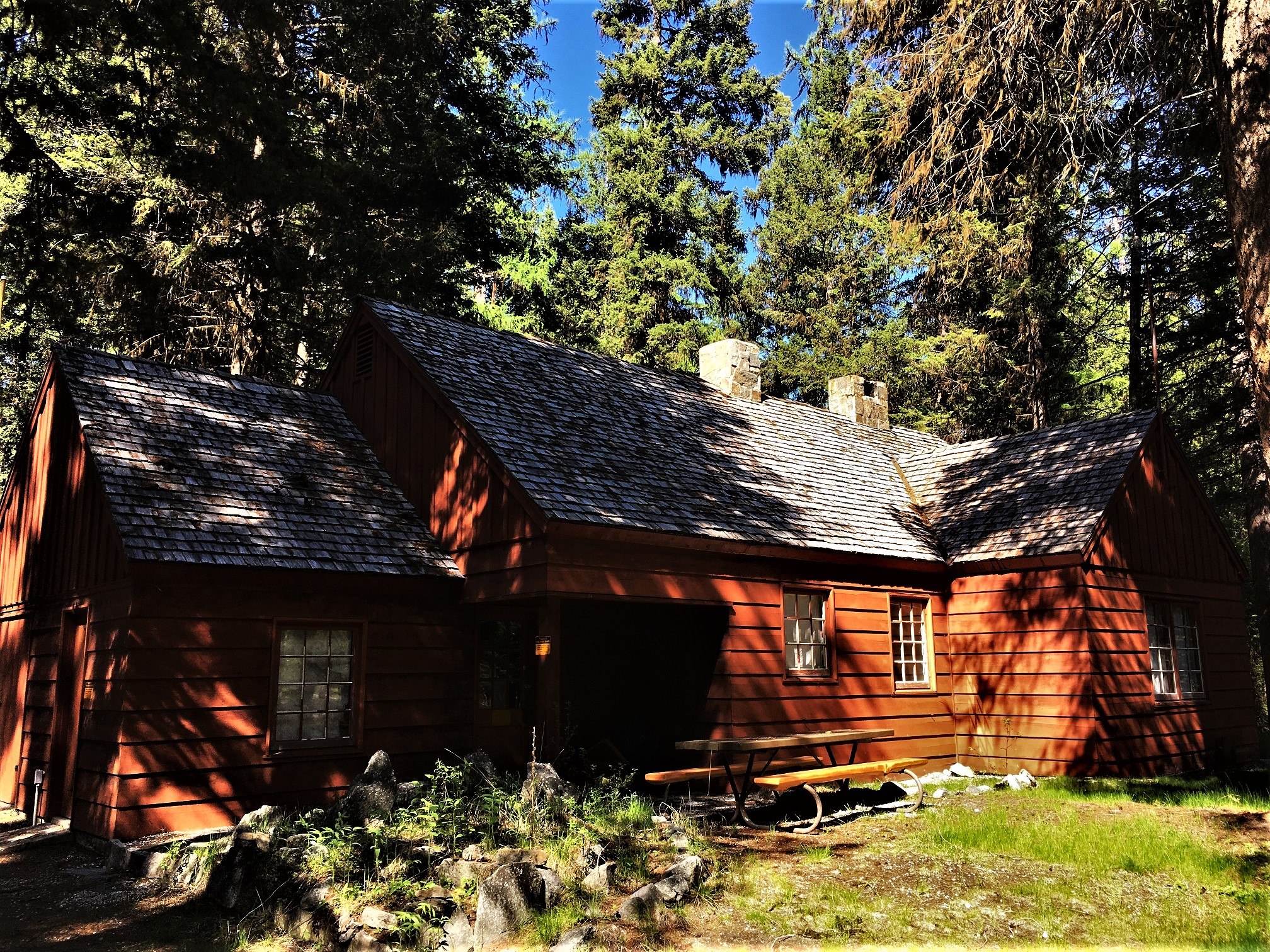
Another pic

It was deemed significant architecturally as an outstanding example of "the rustic architectural idiom developed by the Forest Service, Pacific Northwest Region, to impart Forest Service identity and to represent its purposes and ideal, and signifies the agency's particular interpretation of a singular expression of early twentieth century American architectural thought."
