= Columbine Work Station =

- U.S. National Register of Historic Places
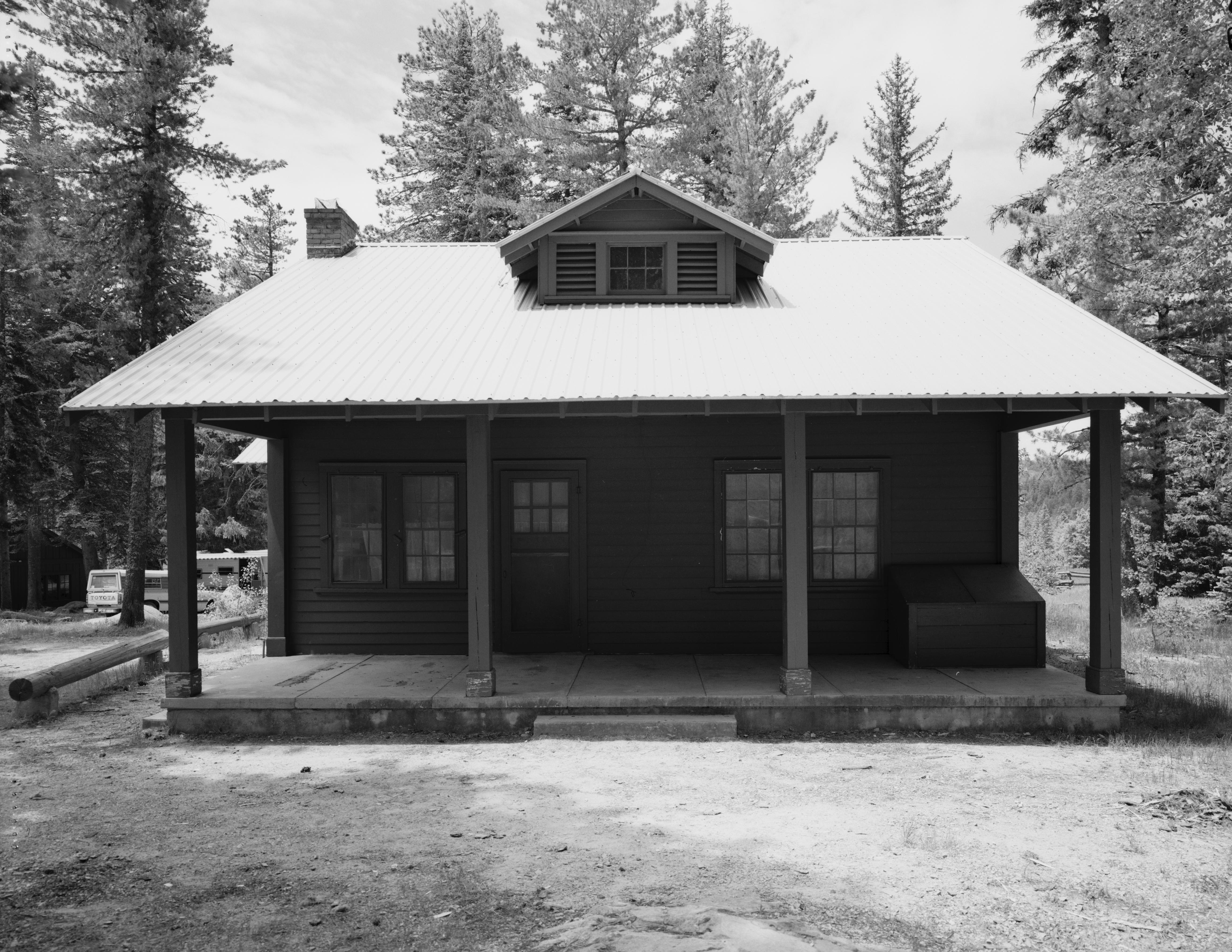

- Location within Arizona Location within the United States
- Nearest city: Safford, Arizona
- Coordinates: 32°42′13″N 109°54′46″W
- Area: 1 acre (4,000 m^{2})
- Built: 1935
- Architect: USDA Forest Service
- Architectural style: Bungalow/Craftsman
- MPS: Depression-Era USDA Forest Service Administrative Complexes in Arizona MPS
- NRHP reference No.: 93000516
- Added to NRHP: June 10, 1993

The Columbine Work Station in Coronado National Forest near Safford, Arizona was built in 1935 by the Civilian Conservation Corps (CCC). The complex is a representative example of a Depression-era Forest Service administrative center. The station is on a high point of the Pinaleño Mountains in forested land. The main residence is in the Forest Service bungalow style. The barn is unique, not designed to a standard Forest Service prototype.

The station was built by a CCC unit operating from a camp about five miles away in 1934–35.

It was listed on the National Register of Historic Places in 1993 for its architecture, which is Bungalow/Craftsman style. It served historically as institutional housing. Two contributing buildings on 1 acre (4,000 m^{2}) were included in the NRHP listing. The station continues to be used for summer maintenance activities in Coronado National Forest.
