= Beaver Creek Ranger Station =

- U.S. National Register of Historic Places
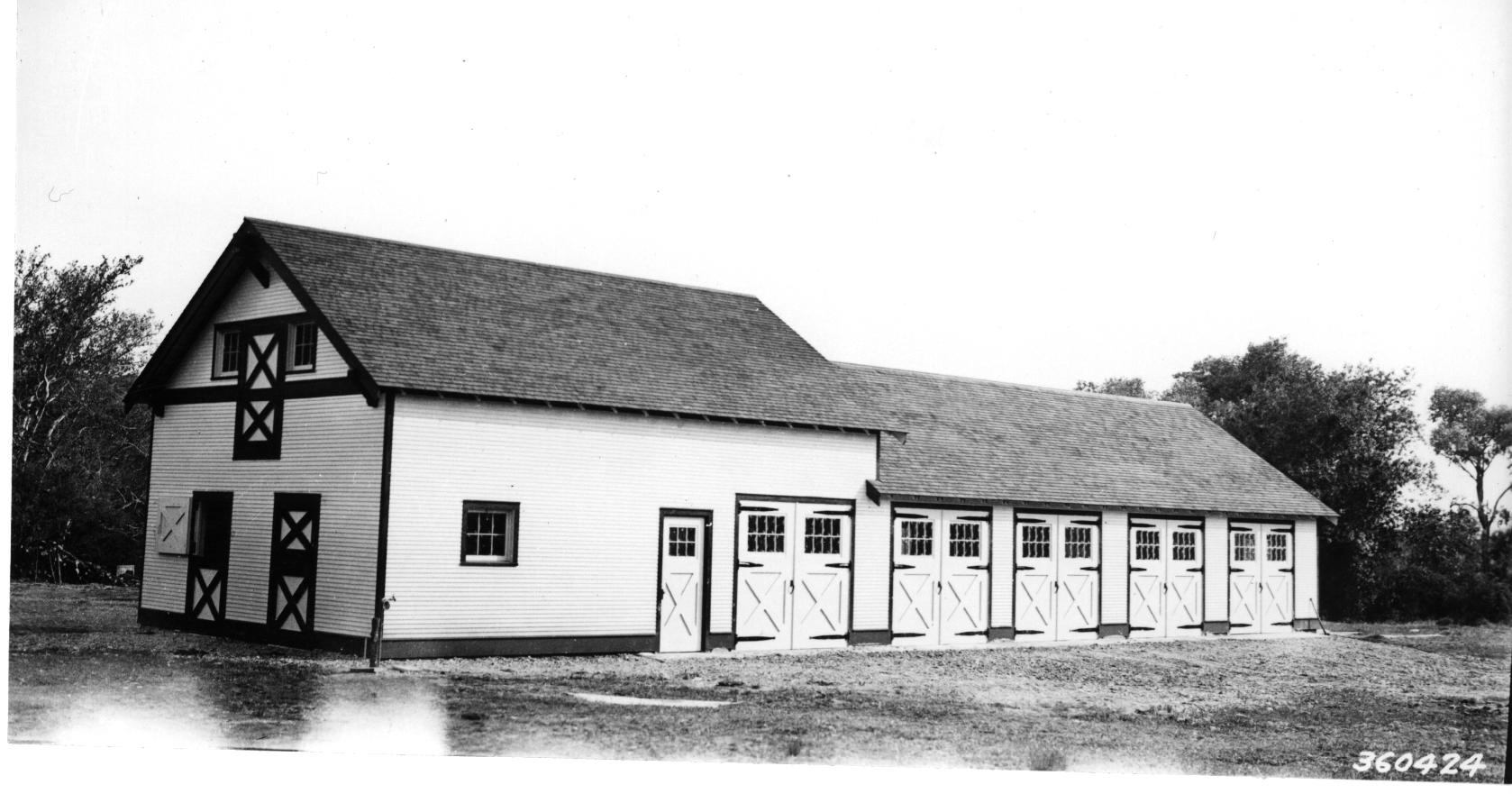

- Location within Arizona Location within the United States
- Nearest city: Rimrock, Arizona
- Coordinates: 34°40′18″N 111°42′48″W
- Area: 47 acres (19 ha)
- Built: 1935
- Built by: Civilian Conservation Corps
- Architect: USDA Forest Service
- Architectural style: Bungalow/Craftsman
- MPS: Depression-Era USDA Forest Service Administrative Complexes in Arizona MPS
- NRHP reference No.: 93000512
- Added to NRHP: June 10, 1993

The Beaver Creek Ranger Station near Rimrock, Arizona was built in 1935 by the Civilian Conservation Corps. It was designed by architects of the U.S. Forest Service. It was listed on the National Register of Historic Places on June 10, 1993, for its architecture, which is of Bungalow/Craftsman style. It served historically as institutional housing and as government office space. The NRHP listing was for three contributing buildings and two other contributing structures on a 47-acre (19 ha) area.

It includes a ranger station office, a ranger residence, and a barn/garage/shop building.
