= Remmel Mountain =

Mountain in Washington (state), United States

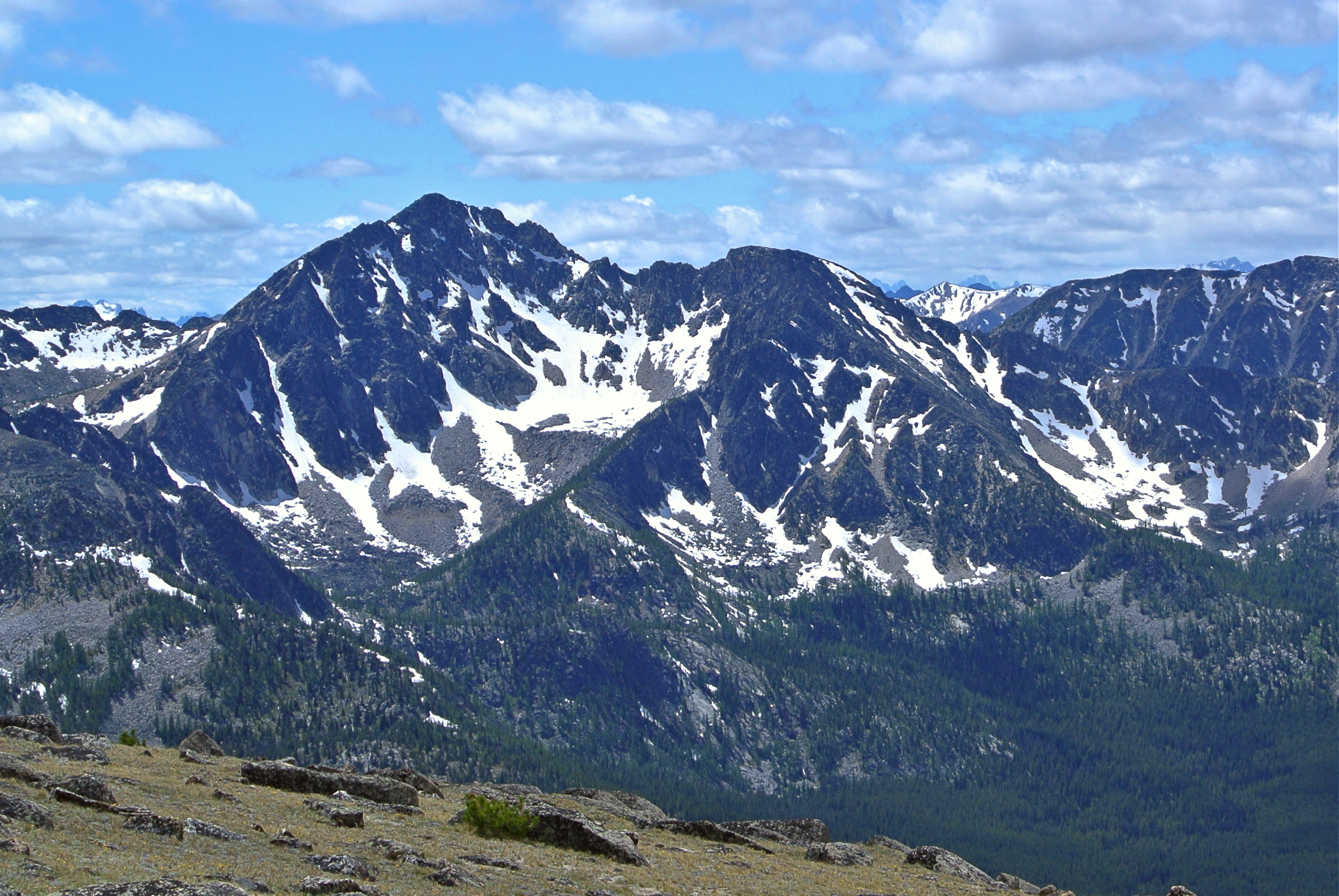
- Remmel Mountain seen from Apex Mountain

Highest point
- Elevation: 8,685 ft (2,647 m)
- Prominence: 4,364 ft (1,330 m)
- Parent peak: Mount Lago
- Isolation: 16.8 mi (27.0 km)
- Listing: Washington prominent peaks 25th Washington highest peaks 25th
- Coordinates: 48°58′32″N 120°11′32″W

Geography
- Location within Washington (state) Location within the United States
- Interactive map of Remmel Mountain
- Country: United States
- State: Washington
- County: Okanogan
- Protected area: Pasayten Wilderness
- Parent range: Cathedral Range; Okanogan Range; North Cascades; Cascade Range
- Topo map: USGS Remmel Mountain

Geology
- Rock type: Granite

Climbing
- First ascent: 1904 by Sledge Tatum and George E. Louden Jr.
- Easiest route: Hiking trail via Southeast slope

Remmel Mountain, also known as Mount Remmel, is a prominent 8,685-foot (2,647-metre) mountain summit located in Okanogan County in Washington state. It is the highest point in the Cathedral Range, which is a subrange of the Okanogan Range in the North Cascades. The mountain is situated 5 miles (8.0 km) south of the Canada–United States border, on the eastern side of the Cascade crest, in the Pasayten Wilderness, on land managed by the Okanogan–Wenatchee National Forest. The nearest higher peak is Mount Lago, 16.8 miles (27.0 km) to the west-southwest, and Amphitheater Mountain lies 3.6 miles (5.8 km) to the north. Remmel is the third-highest summit of the Okanogan Range following Mount Lago (8,745 ft), and Robinson Mountain (8,726 ft). These three peaks follow Jack Mountain (9,075 ft) as the highest peaks in the Pasayten Wilderness. Remmel is the most prominent mountain in the Pasayten Wilderness. Topographic relief is significant as the summit rises approximately 2,300 feet (700 meters) above Andrews Creek in 0.75 mile (1.2 km). Precipitation runoff from Remmel Mountain drains into the Chewuch River basin.

== History ==
The peak was named in 1898 by Albert Hale Sylvester, a pioneer surveyor, explorer, topographer, and forest supervisor in the Cascades who named thousands of natural features. The first ascent of the summit was made July 26, 1904, by Sledge Tatum and George E. Louden Jr., two members of the Boundary Survey group led by Edward C. Barnard. Remmel Mountain was once topped by a gable roof single-room 14' by 14' fire lookout that was built by the Forest Service in the 1930s. The lookout was subject to heavy lightning strikes that forced its closure, and by 1969 was reported destroyed. Had it been still operating in 2001, that fire lookout would have been in a position to locate the nearby Thirtymile Fire which killed four firefighters in Chewuch Canyon.

== Geology ==
The North Cascades features some of the most rugged topography in the Cascade Range with craggy peaks, granite spires, ridges, and deep glacial valleys. Geological events occurring many years ago created the diverse topography and drastic elevation changes over the Cascade Range leading to the various climate differences.

The history of the formation of the Cascade Mountains dates back millions of years ago to the late Eocene Epoch. With the North American Plate overriding the Pacific Plate, episodes of volcanic igneous activity persisted. In addition, small fragments of the oceanic and continental lithosphere called terranes created the North Cascades about 50 million years ago.

During the Pleistocene period dating back over two million years ago, glaciation advancing and retreating repeatedly scoured the landscape leaving deposits of rock debris. The U-shaped cross section of the river valleys is a result of recent glaciation. Uplift and faulting in combination with glaciation have been the dominant processes which have created the tall peaks and deep valleys of the North Cascades area.

== Climate ==
Weather fronts originating in the Pacific Ocean travel northeast toward the Cascade Mountains. As fronts approach the North Cascades, they are forced upward by the peaks of the Cascade Range (orographic lift), causing them to drop their moisture in the form of rain or snowfall onto the Cascades. As a result, the west side of the North Cascades experiences higher precipitation than the east side, especially during the winter months in the form of snowfall. During winter months, weather is usually cloudy, but, due to high pressure systems over the Pacific Ocean that intensify during summer months, there is often little or no cloud cover during the summer.

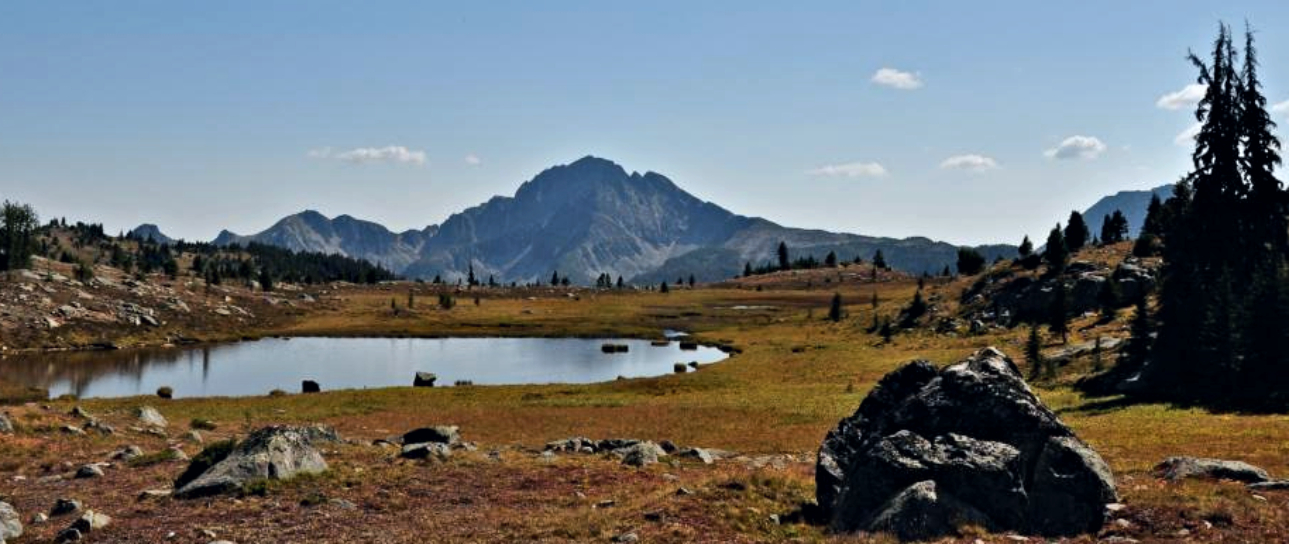
Remmel in the distance with glacier-scoured landscape in the foreground

== See also ==
- List of mountain peaks of Washington (state)
- Geography of the North Cascades
- Geology of the Pacific Northwest
