= Pearrygin Lake =

Lake in Okanogan County, Washington, United States

- Location within Washington (state) Location within the United States
- Location: Okanogan County, Washington
- Coordinates: 48.49°N 120.151°W
- Catchment area: 11.8 sq mi (31 km^{2})
- Basin countries: United States
- Max. length: 1.3 mi (2.1 km)
- Max. width: 1,750 ft (530 m)
- Surface area: 183.2 acres (74.1 ha)
- Max. depth: 49 ft (10 m)
- Water volume: 6,260 acre⋅ft (7,700,000 m^{3})
- Surface elevation: 1,929 ft (588 m)

Pearrygin Lake is a 212-acre (86 ha) reservoir lying 1.5 miles (2.4 km) northeast of Winthrop in Okanogan County, Washington. It has a maximum depth of 49 feet (15 m) and a water volume of 6,260 acre-feet (7,720,000 m^{3}). The lake is fed by a diversion from the Chewuch River and several small inlets; it drains westerly into the Chewuch River. It lies within the watershed of the Lower Chewuch River.

The lake is oriented from northwest to southeast in a narrow, glacially carved valley where it abuts a forested slope to the south and open shrub-steppe habitat to the north. It is located in Section 36, Township 35N, Range 21E. The lake is almost entirely surrounded by Pearrygin Lake State Park. A privately owned RV camping resort occupies the lake's northern shore. The lake's primary sports fish is rainbow trout.

== History ==
The lake bears the name of B.F. "Ben" Pearrygin, who homesteaded the area in the late 1880s. The lake became a reservoir intended for irrigation and recreational purposes with the completion of a dam in 1921.
