= Parson Smith Tree =

- U.S. National Register of Historic Places
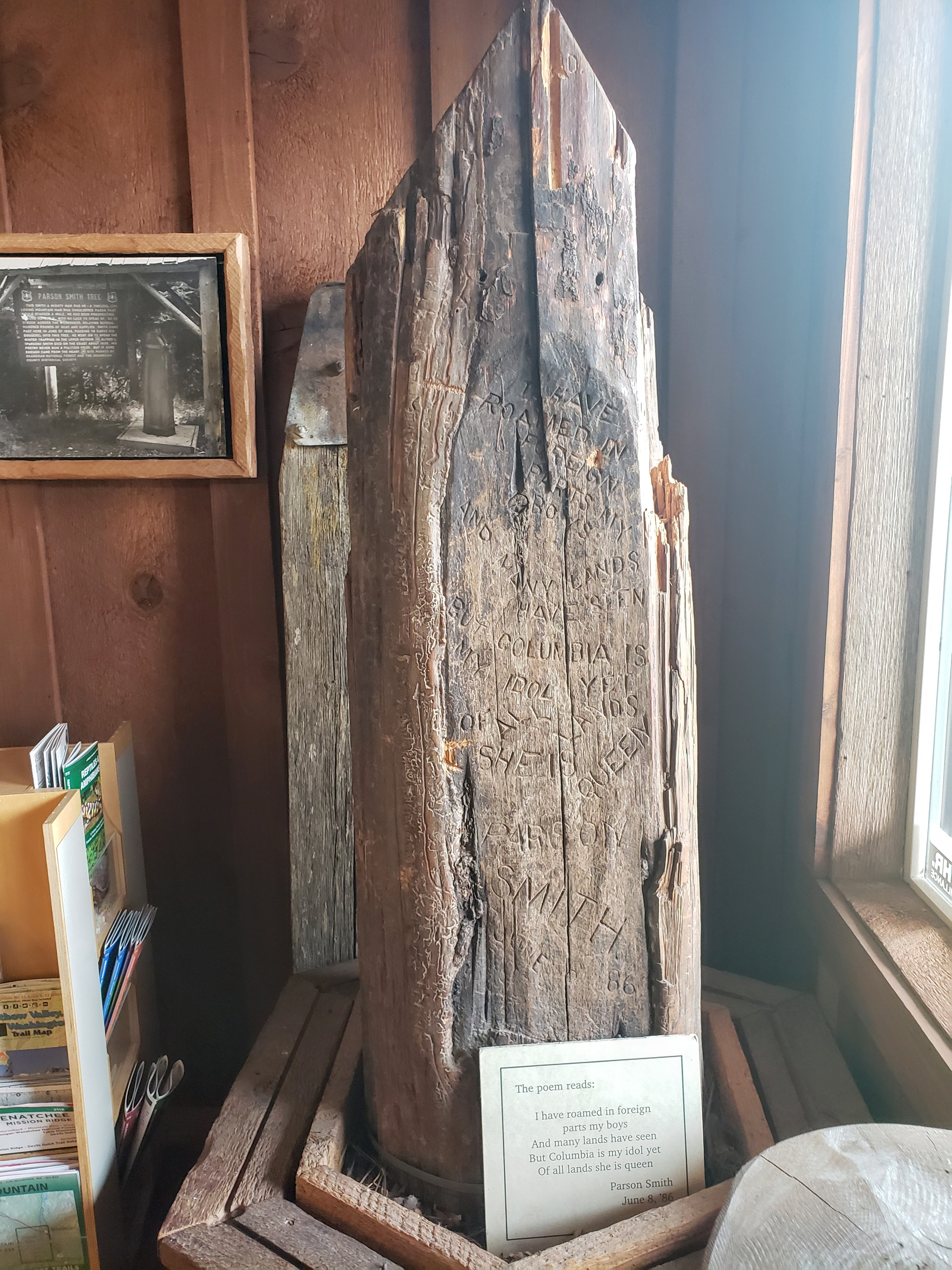

- Location within Washington (state)
- Nearest city: Winthrop, Washington
- Coordinates: 48.478982°N 120.189270°W,
- Area: 0.1 acres (0.040 ha)
- Built: 1886
- NRHP reference No.: 72001279
- Added to NRHP: March 16, 1972

The Parson Smith Tree is a historic tree in the Okanogan–Wenatchee National Forest in Okanogan County, Washington, located 19 feet (5.8 m) south of the Canada–US border. In 1886, prospector and trapper Alfred L. (Parson) Smith passed the tree during a trek through the wilderness. Smith stopped to carve the following poem into the tree:

I have roamed in foreign parts my boys,
And many lands have seen,
But Columbia is my idol yet
Of all lands, she is Queen.

As the tree was located in a remote area away from existing trails, the poem went unnoticed until 1902 or 1903, when surveyor John Bell noticed the tree during his work. The tree came to the attention of the U.S. Forest Service when a ranger saw the tree in 1913. The Forest Service built a shelter over the tree in 1913 in order to preserve it. The tree, which has since died, was marked by a sign and was accessible via a hiking trail.

The tree was added to the National Register of Historic Places on March 16, 1972.

After getting damaged by a bear, the tree was relocated to the Early Winters Ranger Station in 1980, before being relocated again to the Methow Valley Ranger Station in Winthrop at a later date, where it currently resides.
