= Apex Mountain =

Apex Mountain may refer to

- Apex Mountain (Chaba Icefield) in the Canadian Rockies
- Apex Mountain (Okanogan County, Washington) in Washington state, United States
- Apex Mountain Resort, a ski resort in British Columbia, Canada
