= Early Winters =

Early Winters may refer to:

- Early Winters Creek, a tributary of the Methow River
- Early Winters Spires, mountain in the north Cascades
- Early Winters Ski Resort, a proposed ski resort near the creek
- Early Winters (company)
