= Cathedral Peak (Washington) =

Mountain Peak in Washington

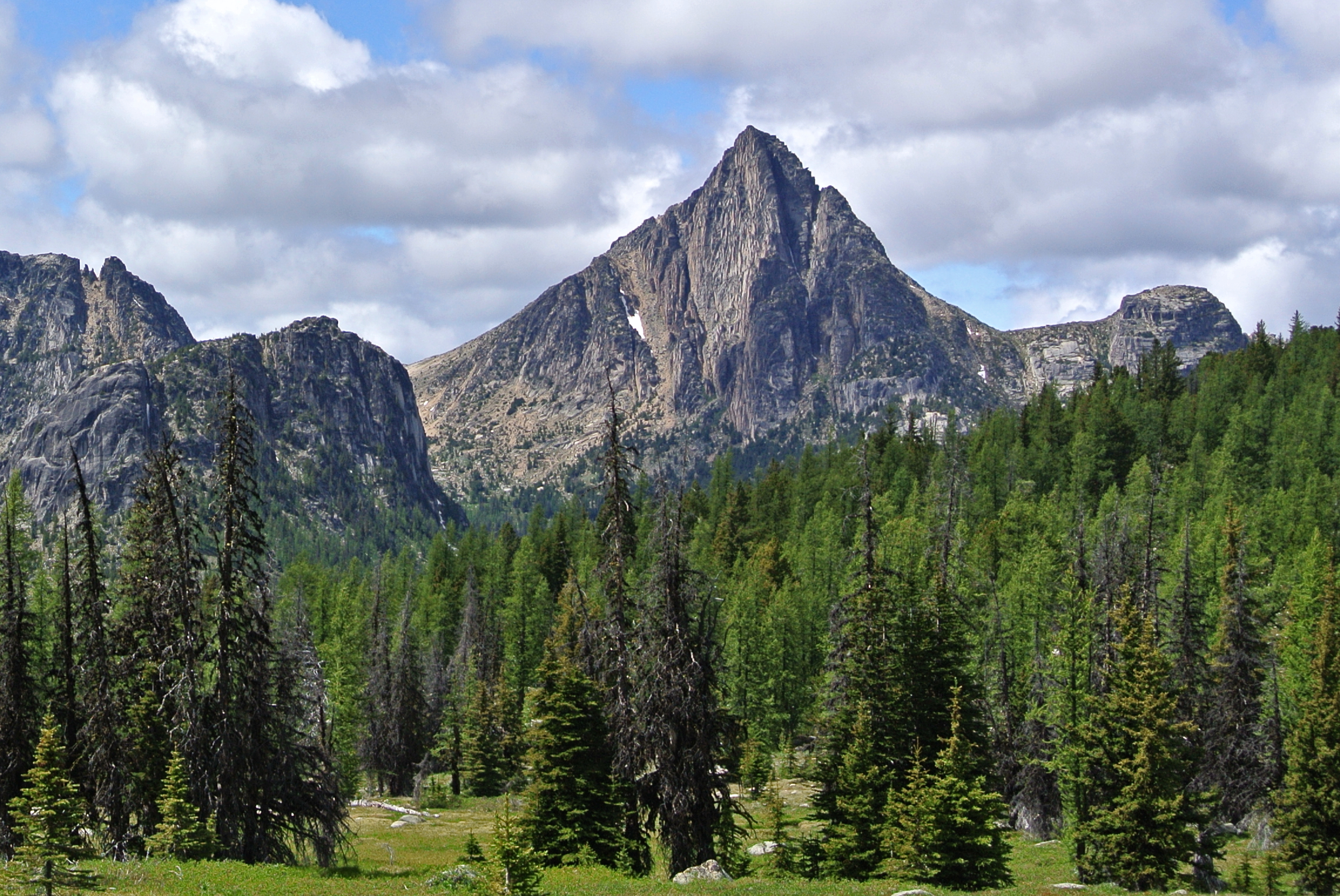
- Cathedral Peak seen from Apex Pass

Highest point
- Elevation: 8,606 ft (2,623 m) NAVD 88
- Prominence: 989 ft (301 m)
- Listing: List of Highest Mountain Peaks in Washington
- Coordinates: 48°59′21″N 120°11′20″W

Geography
- Location within Washington (state) Location within the United States
- Interactive map of Cathedral Peak
- Location: Pasayten Wilderness; Okanogan County; Washington, U.S.
- Parent range: Okanogan Range; North Cascades; Cascade Range
- Topo map: USGS Remmel Mountain

Geology
- Rock type: Granite

Climbing
- First ascent: 1901 by Carl W. Smith and George O. Smith
- Easiest route: Scrambling class 3 Southwest slope

Cathedral Peak is an 8,606-foot (2,623-metre) mountain summit located in Okanogan County in Washington state. It is part of the Okanogan Range which is a sub-range of the North Cascades. The mountain is situated in the Pasayten Wilderness, on land administered by the Okanogan–Wenatchee National Forest. The nearest higher peak is Grimface Mountain, 2.6 miles (4.2 km) to the north in Cathedral Provincial Park in Canada. The Pacific Northwest Trail traverses below the south slope of Cathedral Peak as it crosses Cathedral Pass. Less than a mile to the opposite side of the pass stands Amphitheater Mountain. Precipitation runoff from Cathedral Peak drains west into Cathedral Fork, or east into Cathedral Creek.

== Climate ==
Most weather fronts originate in the Pacific Ocean, and travel northeast toward the Cascade Mountains. As fronts approach the North Cascades, they are forced upward by the peaks of the Cascade Range, causing them to drop their moisture in the form of rain or snowfall onto the Cascades (Orographic lift). As a result, the west side of the North Cascades experiences higher precipitation than the east side, especially during the winter months in the form of snowfall. During winter months, weather is usually cloudy, but, due to high pressure systems over the Pacific Ocean that intensify during summer months, there is often little or no cloud cover during the summer.

== Geology ==
The North Cascades features some of the most rugged topography in the Cascade Range with craggy peaks, spires, ridges, and deep glacial valleys. Geological events occurring many years ago created the diverse topography and drastic elevation changes over the Cascade Range leading to the various climate differences.

The history of the formation of the Cascade Mountains dates back millions of years ago to the late Eocene Epoch. With the North American Plate overriding the Pacific Plate, episodes of volcanic igneous activity persisted. In addition, small fragments of the oceanic and continental lithosphere called terranes created the North Cascades about 50 million years ago.

During the Pleistocene period dating back over two million years ago, glaciation advancing and retreating repeatedly scoured the landscape leaving deposits of rock debris. The U-shaped cross section of the river valleys is a result of recent glaciation. Uplift and faulting in combination with glaciation have been the dominant processes which have created the tall peaks and deep valleys of the North Cascades area.

== Climbing Routes ==
Established rock climbing routes on Cathedral Peak:

- South Face - class 5.8 7 pitches First ascent in 1968 by Fred Beckey and party
- Southeast Buttress - class 5.9 9-10 pitches
- Northeast Ridge - class 5.3 7 pitches

== See also ==
- List of mountain peaks of Washington (state)
- Geography of the North Cascades
- Geology of the Pacific Northwest
