= Thirtymile Fire =

2001 fire in the Okanogan National Forest, Washington state

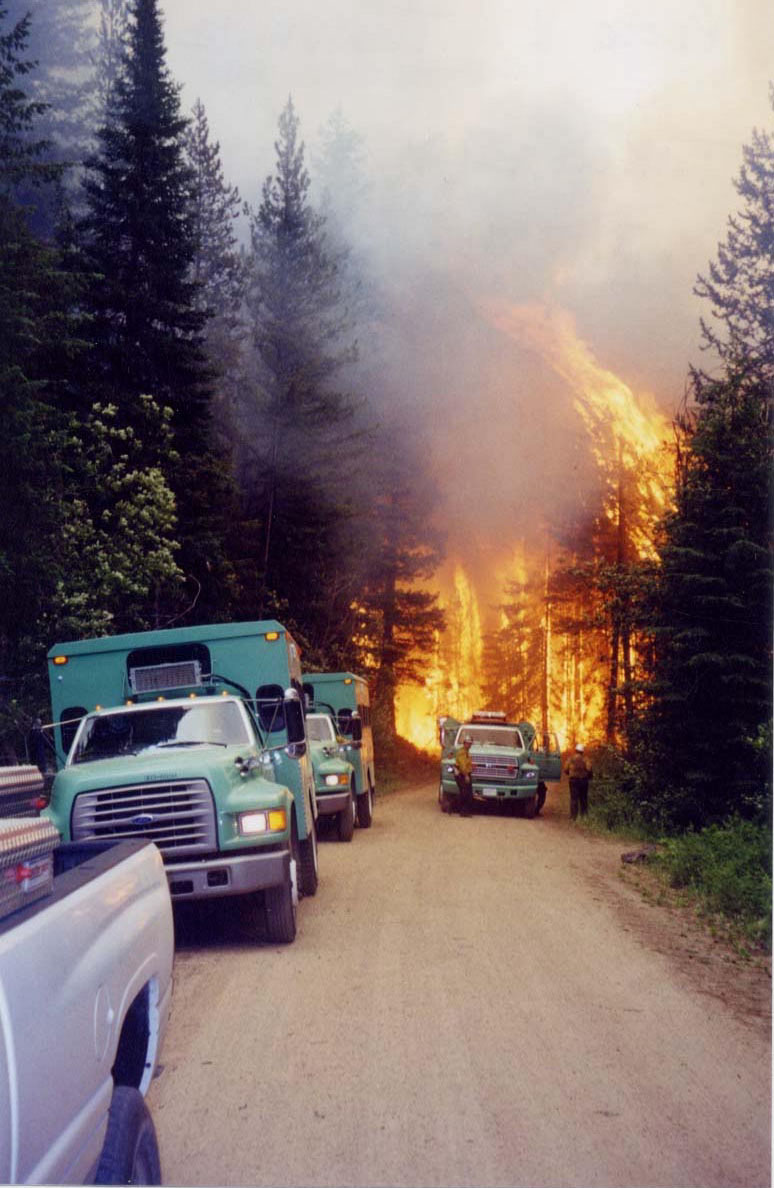
- The Thirtymile Fire crossing a road in the Chewuch River canyon
- Date: July 9, 2001 – July 23, 2001
- Location: Okanogan National Forest, Okanogan County, Washington
- Coordinates: 48°47.485′N 120°04.261′W

Statistics
- Burned area: 9,324 acres (38 km^{2})

Impacts
- Deaths: 4
- Cost: US$4.5 million

Ignition
- Cause: Campfire

Map
- Location in Washington

The Thirtymile Fire was first reported on July 9, 2001 in the Okanogan National Forest, approximately 30 miles (48 km) north of Winthrop, Washington, United States. The wildfire had been caused by an unattended campfire that spread rapidly in the hot and dry weather in the Pacific Northwest. Four firefighters were killed when the fire cut off their only escape route out of the narrow canyon.

The fire burned 9,324 acres (38 km^{2}) of forest land dominated by Douglas-fir and lodgepole pine trees in the Chewuch River canyon. More than a thousand firefighters were involved in suppressing the fire, which was declared contained on July 23, 2001. Suppression costs ran US$4.5 million.

A Forest Service investigation found that numerous safety procedures were violated leading up to the fatal entrapment: fire managers repeatedly underestimated the potential danger of the situation and failed to establish and maintain escape routes and safety zones. Incident commander Ellreese Daniels was later charged with involuntary manslaughter and making false statements to investigators. Daniels pleaded guilty to two misdemeanor charges of making false statements to investigators as part of a plea deal; he was sentenced to three months of work release.

== Environmental conditions ==
The fire began in the Chewuch River canyon about 30 miles (48 km) north of Winthrop, Washington. The canyon—located in the Okanogan National Forest—runs from northeast to southwest, with steep slopes of approximately 3,000 feet (914 m). The canyon floor near the point of origin is about 1,500 feet (457 m) wide. Fuels in the canyon included spruce, Douglas-fir, lodgepole pine and cottonwood trees at the canyon floor and Doug-fir, lodgepole, and ponderosa pine on the canyon slopes. A single dead-end road follows the canyon upriver and leads to the Thirtymile Campground.

High temperatures, low humidity, and extended drought conditions combined to create the potential for extreme fire behavior. The winter of 2000–2001 was the area's second-driest winter in 30 years, and on July 10, 2001 temperatures in the canyon reached 94 °F (34 °C) and relative humidity dropped to about 8%—both near-historic extremes for the area.

On July 9, the Libby South Fire was accidentally ignited by the exhaust system of a fire patrol vehicle about 20 miles (32 km) south of Winthrop. The fire grew to over 1,000 acres (4 km^{2}) by that evening, making it the first major North Cascades wildfire of the season.

== Firefighting response ==
=== Initial attack ===
The Thirtymile Fire was first reported at 9:26 pm Pacific Daylight Time on July 9, 2001 by a Canadian firefighting aircraft returning to Canada after working on the Libby South Fire. A small firefighting crew was dispatched, arriving at the fire shortly after 11 pm that evening. They soon discovered the fire's origin—an escaped picnic cooking fire. Those responsible for abandoning the campfire that started the fire were never found.

The initial crew encountered spot fires burning on both sides of the Chewuch River and estimated the fire's size at 3–8 acres (12,000–32,000 m^{2}). At around midnight, the incident commander requested additional firefighters and resources, stating that the fire must "be taken care of tonight because if it hits that slope it is going to the ridge top." Although the fire was located in a remote area far from any towns or homes, Forest Service officials did not consider allowing the fire to burn. Officials believed that due to the severe fire conditions, the Thirtymile Fire could quickly grow out of control and spread to popular recreation areas and private land.

The Entiat Interagency Hotshot Crew (IHC) arrived at the scene about an hour later, at 1 am on July 10. Hotshot crews are among the most highly trained wildland firefighters in the United States. They are sent to large or high-priority fires, often for extended periods of time and with little logistical support. The Entiat IHC had spent July 9 suppressing a fire near Spokane, Washington, and was dispatched to the Thirtymile Fire with almost no rest. Shortly after arrival, the Entiat IHC supervisor assumed the role of incident commander of the fire.

At 2 am, the Entiat IHC requested air support and an additional crew for later in the morning. The hotshot crew continued to work on digging fire lines and containing spot fires until they were relieved by the Northwest Regulars #6 crew at 9 am.

=== Northwest Regulars #6 ===
Fire crews observe the fire from the "lunch site" safety zone

The Northwest Regulars #6 (NWR #6) were a Type 2 fire crew consisting of 21 members from two Ranger Districts in central Washington. Many of the crew members were young and inexperienced—over one-third were rookies in their first fire season with the Forest Service. Shortly after midnight on July 10, the NWR #6 crew was called up to assist in fighting the Libby South Fire. The crew was divided into three squads and headed by crew boss Ellreese Daniels and crew boss trainee Pete Kampen. Daniels was a twenty-year veteran of the Forest Service who had previously served as a division supervisor during the 1988 Yellowstone fires. Kampen—as crew boss trainee—was put in charge of overall tactics, while Daniels acted as a supervisor. This delegation of responsibilities led to confusion among the crew and dispatch as to who was in charge of the situation.

After arriving in Twisp, Washington at 7 am, the crew was informed they would instead be sent to the Thirtymile Fire. The NWR #6 crew arrived at the fire scene at around 9 am and began reviewing the situation with the Entiat IHC. The role of incident commander was transitioned again, this time to NWR #6 crew boss Ellreese Daniels. At 11 am, the Entiat IHC left the scene to rest at a campground two miles down the canyon. The NWR #6 crew then began setting up pumps and digging fire lines.

By noon, the crew began experiencing various equipment failures. The firefighters had problems operating water pumps, several fire hoses burst, and pulaskis were broken. As the fire behavior intensified, a NWR #6 crew member was sent to call back the Entiat IHC. The hotshot crew arrived back at the fire scene at around 2 pm. At 3 pm, the NWR #6 crew and the Entiat IHC assembled at a safety zone known as the "lunch site", where they rested, ate lunch, and prepared their return to the fire.

=== Entrapment ===
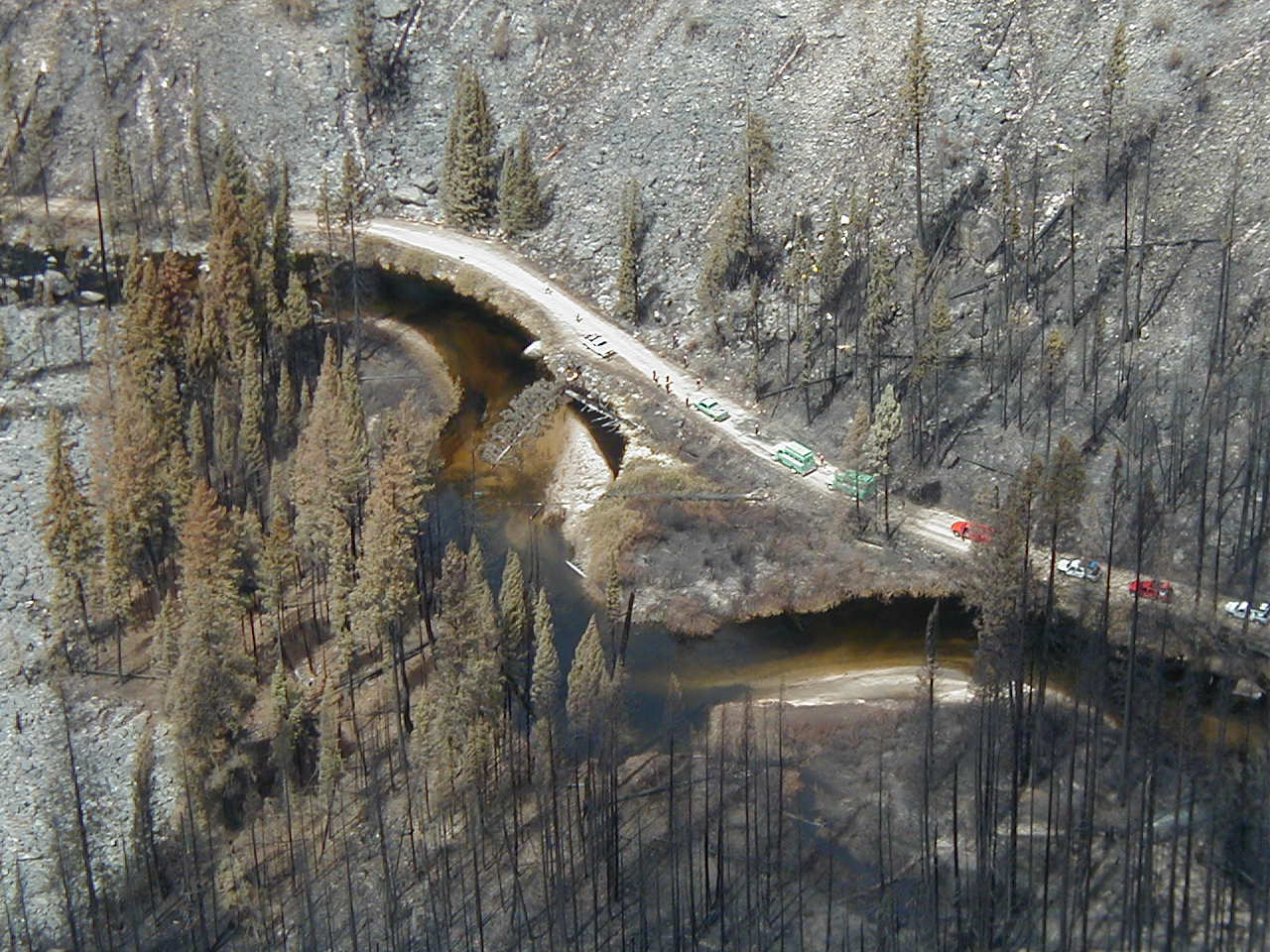
The road and rock scree where the fire shelters were deployed

At around 3:30 pm, two wildland fire engines arrived at the scene. The fire engine crews proceeded up the road from the lunch site and began working on spot fires, trying to contain the fire to the east side of the road. One engine radioed the NWR #6 crew requesting assistance with a spot fire north of the lunch site. Squads 1 and 2, along with incident commander Ellreese Daniels set out to support the fire engine. Shortly after arriving, the engine drove south to work on other spot fires. The third squad was then called to assist an engine—which was now about 1/4 mile (0.40 km) down the road from the other two squads. Minutes after arriving, the fire began spotting near the road and Squad 3 retreated to the lunch site. Squads 1 and 2 attempted to escape, but were cut off by fire crossing the road.

With the only escape route blocked, Ellreese Daniels drove the 13 members of Squads 1 and 2 up the canyon looking for a safe place to wait out the fire. Daniels selected a site about 1 mile (1.6 km) up the road near a bend in the river. The location had relatively sparse vegetation and was flanked by a large rock scree to the west and the Chewuch River to the east.

Shortly after 5 pm, two civilians who had been camping further up the road encountered the firefighters while attempting to leave the area. The two had driven up the road to the Thirtymile campground at 1 pm and did not notice any firefighters along the way. Although the district fire management officer had ordered the road closed earlier that day, no action was taken until after 3 pm.

At 5:24 pm, the fire's behavior abruptly changed, overwhelming the crew. Daniels instructed everyone to deploy their fire shelters—last-resort safety devices designed to protect wildland firefighters from heat and deadly gases. Six firefighters deployed on the rock scree, while the others and the two civilians stayed on the road. Although the shelters are designed to be used by one person, the two civilians shared a shelter with crew member Rebecca Welch. Minutes after deployment, two of the firefighters on the rock scree abandoned their fire shelters: Thom Taylor ran and jumped in the river, while Jason Emhoff sought safety in the crew's van.

=== Rescue and body recovery ===
Approximately 30 minutes after the deployment, Pete Kampen and members of the Entiat IHC arrived for the rescue operation. The eight firefighters and two civilians who deployed on the road suffered only minor burns and smoke inhalation. Jason Emhoff experienced third degree burns to his hands as a result of attempting to put out flames in his shelter without wearing gloves. The four firefighters who remained on the rocks exhibited no signs of life. All four—Tom Craven, of Ellensburg, and Devin Weaver, Jessica Johnson, and Karen FitzPatrick, all of Yakima—had died as a result of asphyxia due to inhalation of superheated products of combustion. Craven, who served as a squad boss during the fire, was a veteran firefighter in his thirteenth fire season with the Forest Service. Weaver, Johnson and FitzPatrick were all in their first season. The incident was the deadliest wildland firefighting disaster in the US since the 1994 South Canyon Fire in Colorado, which killed 14 firefighters.

The Thirtymile Fire went on to burn an area of 9,324 acres (38 km^{2}) before it was declared fully contained on July 23. Over 1,000 firefighters were brought in to fight the fire. Suppression of the Thirtymile Fire cost a total of US$4.5 million.

== Aftermath ==
=== Investigation ===
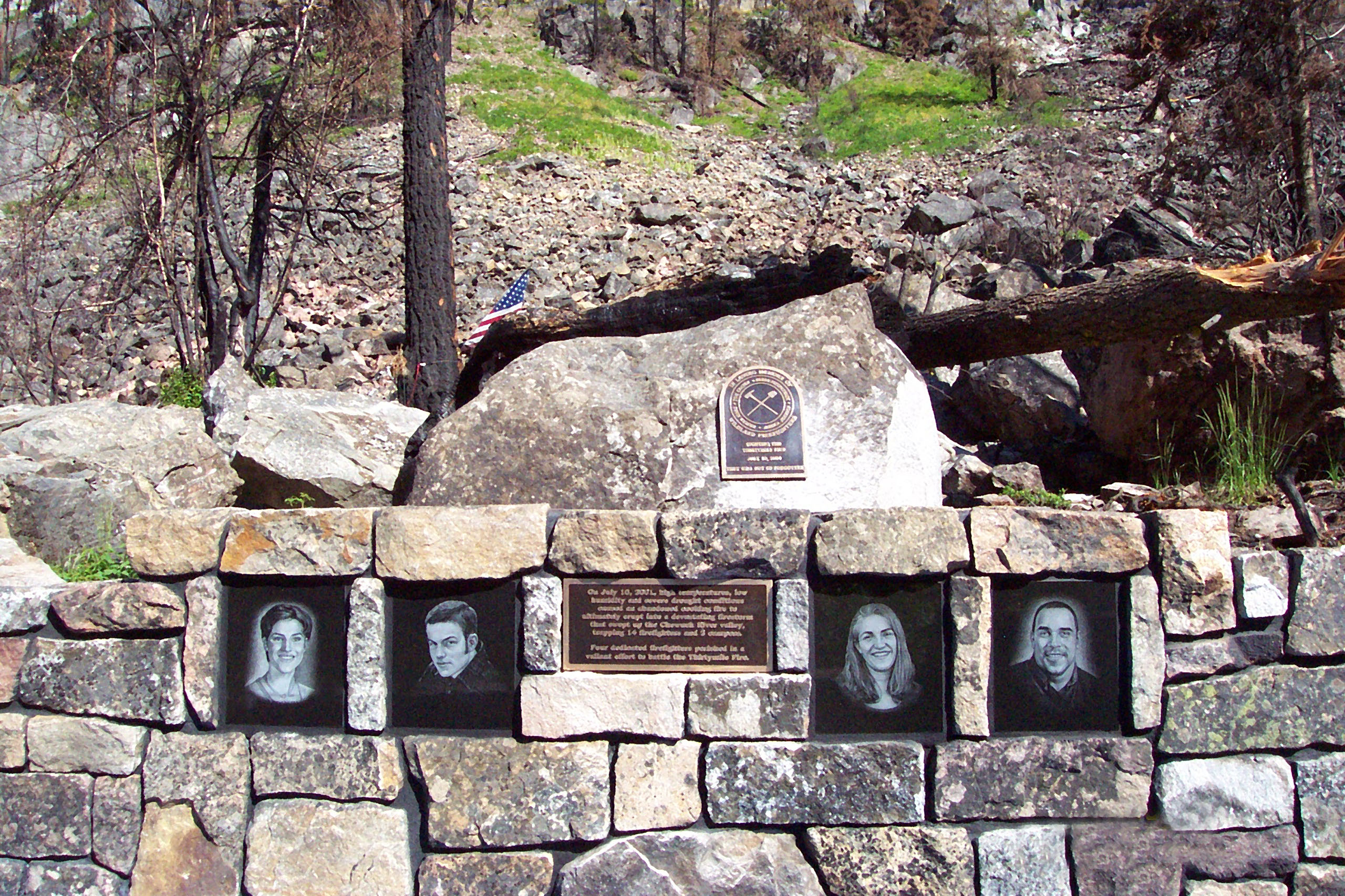
Thirtymile Fire Memorial wall located at the deployment site

The Forest Service promptly opened an investigation into the incident. The investigation team first met in Twisp, Washington on July 11 and began conducting interviews, examining the fatality scene and analyzing the fire. On September 26, the team released their findings in a report which found that "leadership, management, and command and control were all ineffective due to a variety of factors". According to the report, numerous safety rules were broken, the fire's potential growth was disregarded, and leadership failed to communicate effectively and enforce orders. Each of the Ten Standard Firefighting Orders were violated at some point during the incident. The standard orders are a set of wildland firefighting rules which cover basic safety such as staying informed of fire weather conditions, identifying safety zones and escape routes, issuing clear instructions, and maintaining control of the fire crew.

Additionally, the investigation found two major failures in leadership which led to the fatalities: the decision to re-engage the fire and the lack of preparation for a burnover at the entrapment site. Crew boss trainee Pete Kampen had already considered the fire "lost" when the crew pulled back to the lunch site. The Forest Service report states that "there was no viable strategy established" for the crew's return to the fire. The report also found that after the entrapment, incident commander Ellreese Daniels took no actions to improve the deployment site or prepare the crew.

Following the release of the report, the Forest Service sought disciplinary action against 11 employees, ranging from termination to letters of reprimand. The agency recommended firing Ellreese Daniels and permanently removing Pete Kampen from fire work. After an appeals process, the Forest Service reduced most of the disciplinary actions. No employees were fired. Daniels was removed from fire work and accepted a new position as a materials handler.

=== Criminal charges ===
In December 2006, federal prosecutors filed a criminal complaint against Ellreese Daniels in the United States District Court for the Eastern District of Washington. Daniels was charged with four counts of manslaughter and seven counts of making false statements to investigators. Prosecutors alleged that Daniels was grossly negligent while supervising the fire, and that he lied to Forest Service and Occupational Safety and Health Administration investigators about ordering firefighters to come down off the rock scree. If convicted, Daniels faced up to six years in prison for each manslaughter charge.

As part of a plea agreement, Daniels pleaded guilty in April 2008 to two misdemeanor charges of lying to an investigator in exchange for dropping the other charges. In August 2008, he was sentenced to three months of work release and three years of probation.

=== Memorials ===
In 2002, the Forest Service constructed a memorial to the four deceased firefighters at the fatality site. The stone Thirtymile Fire Memorial wall was unveiled on the first anniversary of the deaths.

A second memorial to the firefighters was built by the parents of Tom Craven at their son's gravesite in Roslyn, Washington. The Roslyn memorial is open to the public and includes a rock and charred trees from the spot where the firefighters died, as well as various statues, plaques and pictures.

== See also ==
- 2000–01 fires in the Western United States
- Wildfire suppression

== Sources ==
- Ashton, Linda (July 8, 2002). "Questions over Thirty Mile fire still linger". Associated Press – via Missoulian.
- Brown, Hutch (Summer 2002). "Thirtymile Fire: Fire Behavior and Management Response" (PDF). Fire Management Today. Vol. 62, no. 3. Washington, D.C.: U.S. Department of Agriculture, Forest Service. pp. 23–30.
- Geranios, Nicholas K. (April 29, 2008). "Plea agreement reached in Thirtymile Fire deaths". Associated Press – via The Seattle Times.
- Hansen, Dan (July 14, 2001). "Forest managers didn't have an option of letting fire burn; Even though there are no towns anywhere near Thirty Mile Fire". The Spokesman-Review. Spokane, WA. Archived from the original on August 13, 2018 – via HighBeam Research.
- Maclean, John N. (2007). The Thirtymile Fire (1st ed.). New York: Henry Holt and Company. ISBN 978-0-8050-7578-6.
- "Thirty Mile Fire: Families, comrades to mourn dead firefighters". Associated Press. July 7, 2002 – via Kitsap Sun.
- Thirtymile Fire Investigation (PDF) (Report). U.S. Department of Agriculture, Forest Service. September 26, 2001.
- "Wildfires: 'I Didn't Want to Burn to Death': A Young Crew Stumbles into an Inferno in the Thirtymile Fire, the Most Lethal Blaze in Years". Newsweek. September 3, 2001. p. 28. Archived from the original on August 13, 2018 – via Questia.
- Taus, Margaret (July 16, 2001). "Solemn services for Thirtymile Fire victims draw hundreds". Seattle Post-Intelligencer.
- "Wildland Fire Staff Ride Library". Thirtymile Fire stand 1. Wildland Fire Leadership Development Program. National Wildfire Coordinating Group.
- Wiley, John K. (December 20, 2006). "Crew boss charged in deadly 2001 Thirty Mile wildfire". The Seattle Times.
- Wilkinson, Eric (August 9, 2018). "Father of fallen firefighter heartbroken by vandalized gravesite in Roslyn". KING 5 News.
- "Work release for crew boss in fatal Wash. fire". Associated Press. August 20, 2008 – via NBC News.
