= Grimface Mountain =

Mountain in British Columbia, Canada

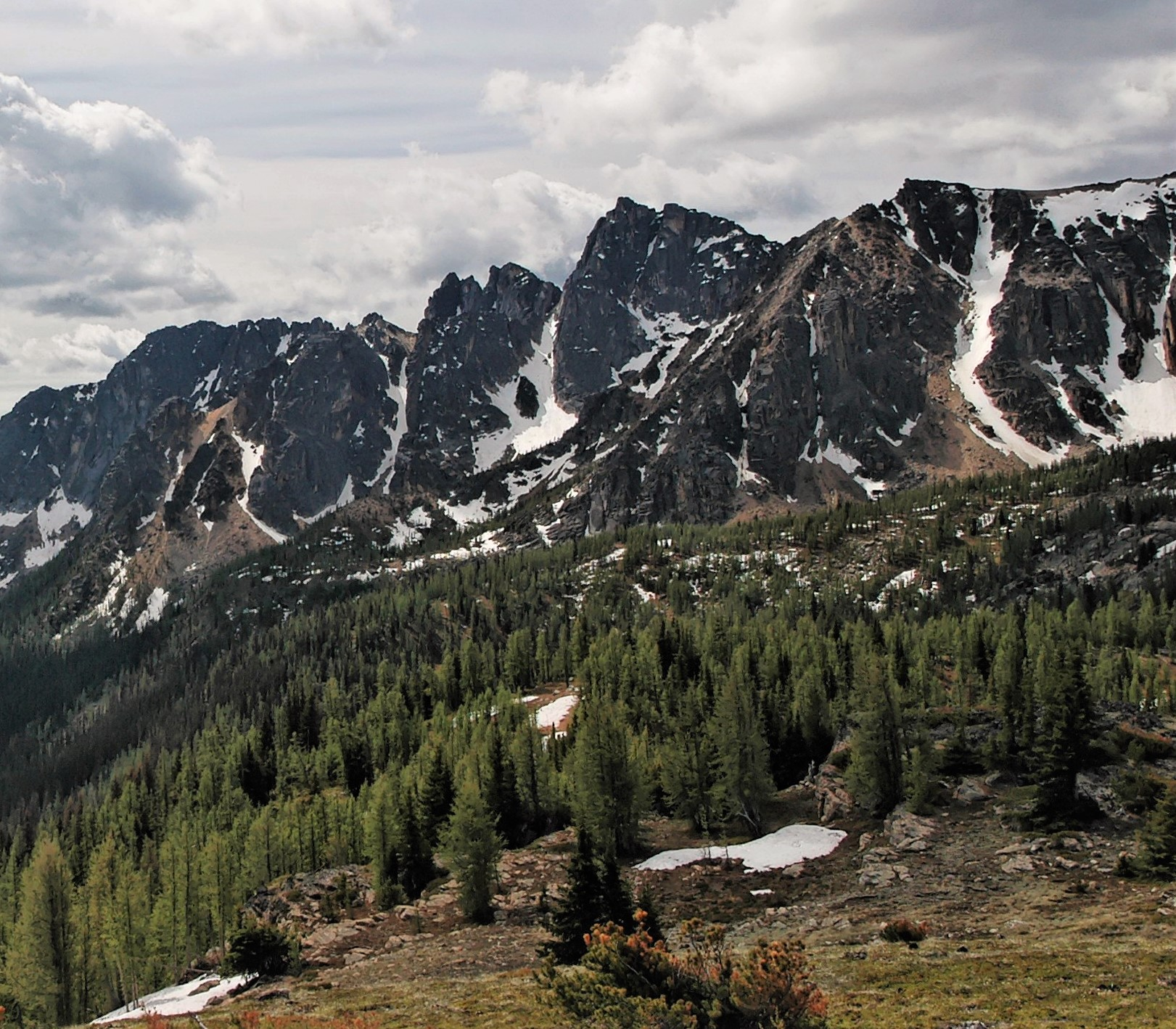
- North aspect, centered

Highest point
- Elevation: 2,635 m (8,645 ft)
- Prominence: 538 m (1,765 ft)
- Parent peak: Remmel Mountain (2,650 m)
- Isolation: 11.52 km (7.16 mi)
- Listing: Mountains of British Columbia
- Coordinates: 49°01′36″N 120°11′09″W

Geography
- Location within British Columbia Location within Canada
- Interactive map of Grimface Mountain
- Country: Canada
- Province: British Columbia
- District: Similkameen Division Yale Land District
- Protected area: Cathedral Provincial Park
- Parent range: Cascade Range; North Cascades; Okanogan Range
- Topo map: NTS 92H1 Ashnola River

Grimface Mountain is a mountain summit in British Columbia, Canada.

== Description ==
Grimface Mountain, elevation 2,635-metres (8,645-feet), is the highest point in Cathedral Provincial Park and Protected Area, as well as the highest point in the Similkameen Division Yale Land District, and the fourth-highest in the Okanogan Range which is a subrange of the North Cascades. It is situated three km (2 mi) north of the Canada–United States border. Precipitation runoff from the mountain's slopes drains into headwaters of Wall and Lakeview creeks which are both tributaries of the Ashnola River. Topographic relief is significant as the summit rises 735 metres (2,411 feet) above Wall Creek in two kilometres (1.2 mile). The mountain's toponym was officially adopted on September 24, 1979, by the Geographical Names Board of Canada.

== Climate ==
Most weather fronts originate in the Pacific Ocean, and travel northeast toward the Cascade Mountains. As fronts approach the North Cascades, they are forced upward by the peaks of the Cascade Range, causing them to drop their moisture in the form of rain or snowfall onto the Cascades (Orographic lift). As a result, the west side of the North Cascades experiences higher precipitation than the east side, especially during the winter months in the form of snowfall. During winter months, weather is usually cloudy, but due to high pressure systems over the Pacific Ocean that intensify during summer months, there is often little or no cloud cover during the summer.

== Geology ==
The North Cascades features some of the most rugged topography in the Cascade Range with craggy peaks, ridges, and deep glacial valleys. Geological events occurring many years ago created the diverse topography and drastic elevation changes over the Cascade Range leading to the various climate differences. These climate differences lead to vegetation variety defining the ecoregions in this area.

The history of the formation of the Cascade Mountains dates back millions of years ago to the late Eocene Epoch. With the North American Plate overriding the Pacific Plate, episodes of volcanic igneous activity persisted. In addition, small fragments of the oceanic and continental lithosphere called terranes created the North Cascades about 50 million years ago.

During the Pleistocene period dating back over two million years ago, glaciation advancing and retreating repeatedly scoured the landscape leaving deposits of rock debris. The U-shaped cross section of the river valleys is a result of recent glaciation. Uplift and faulting in combination with glaciation have been the dominant processes which have created the tall peaks and deep valleys of the North Cascades area.

== Gallery ==
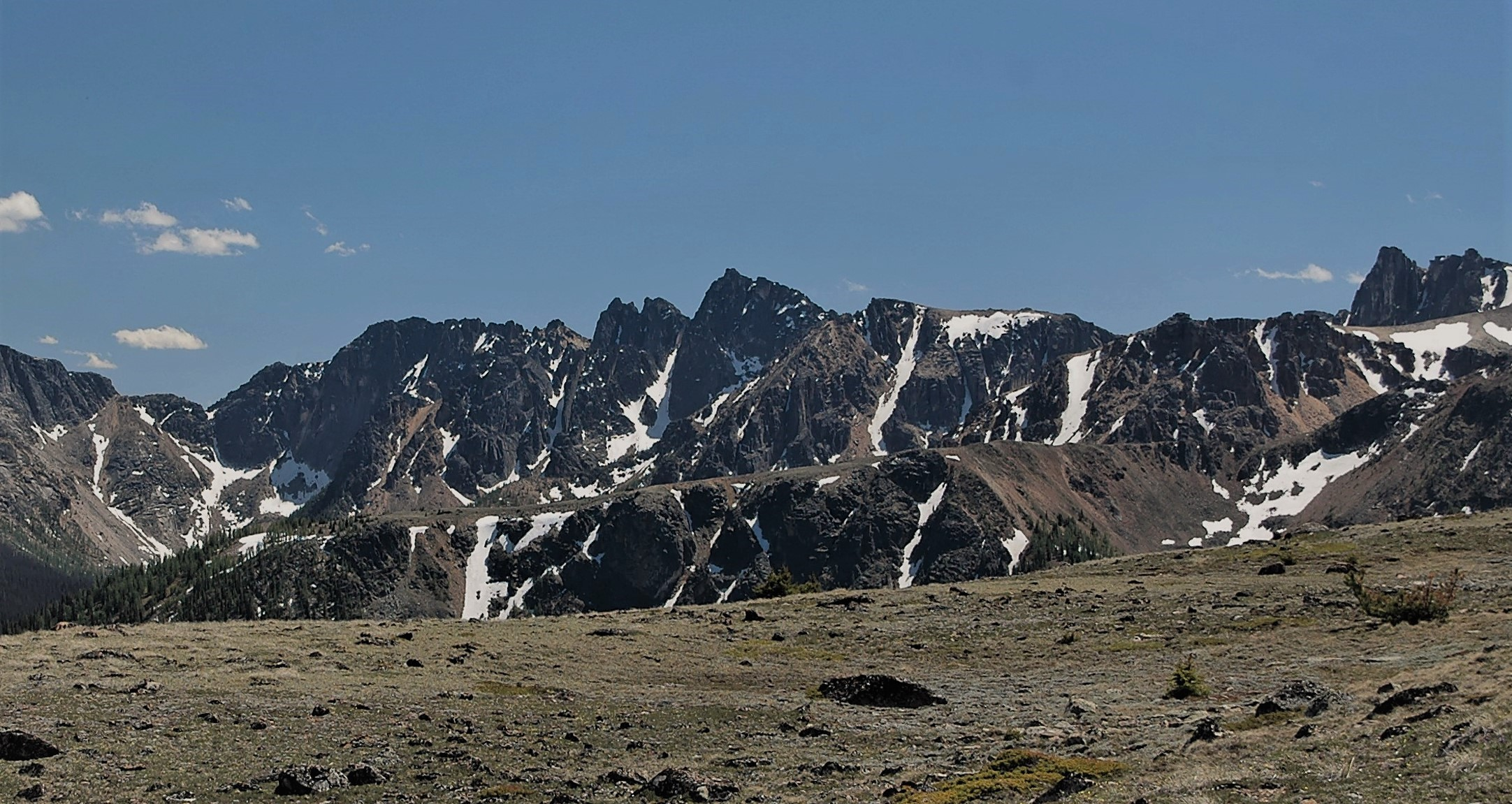
Grimface centered on the skyline

== See also ==
- Geography of British Columbia
- Geography of the North Cascades
