= Pearrygin Lake State Park =

State park in the U.S. state of Washington

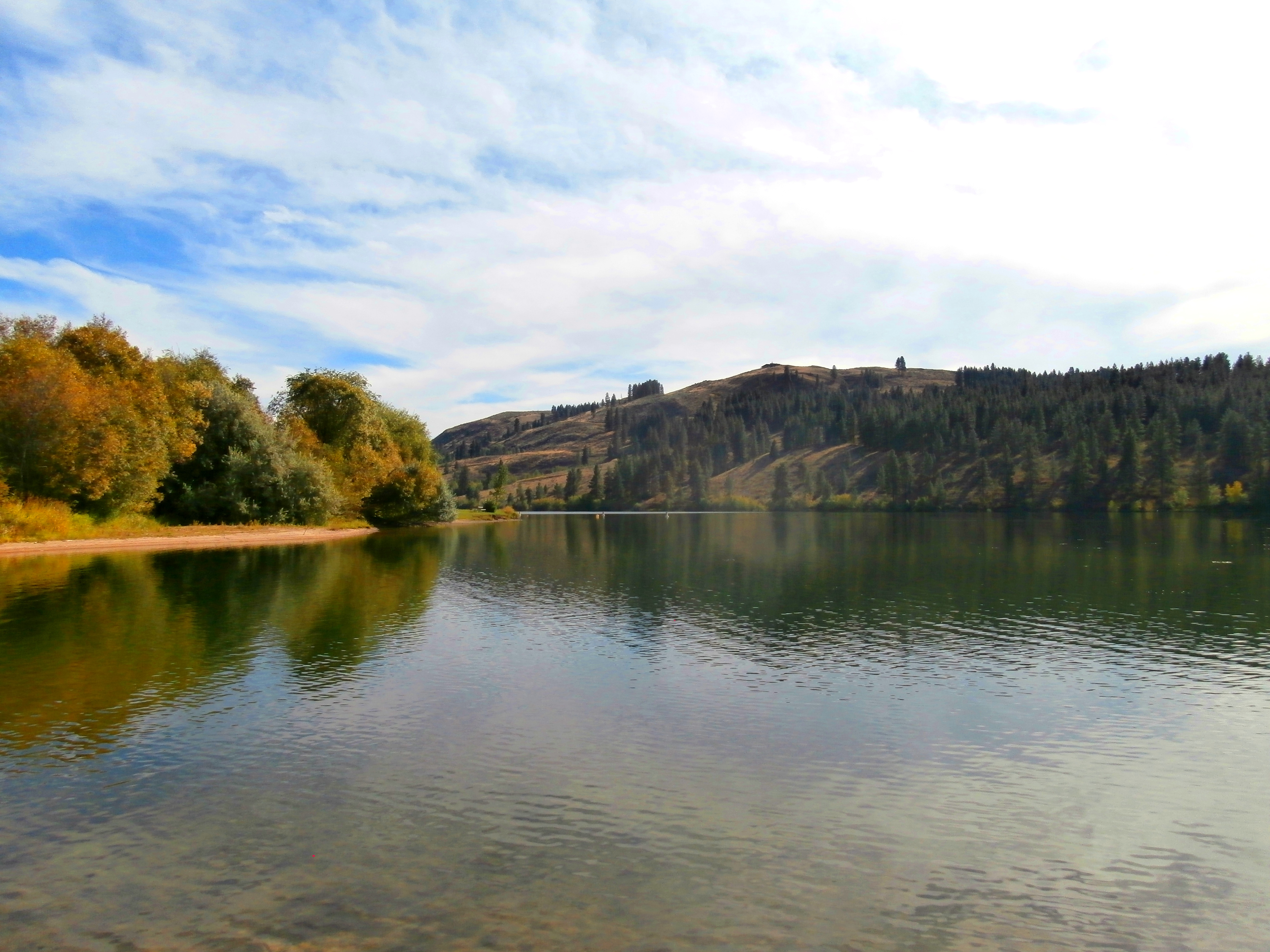

- Location within Washington (state) Location within the United States
- Location: Okanogan County, Washington, United States
- Coordinates: 48°29′37″N 120°09′30″W
- Area: 1,186 acres (480 ha)
- Elevation: 2,096 ft (639 m)
- Established: 1959
- Administrator: Washington State Parks and Recreation Commission
- Visitors: 260,224 (in 2024)
- Named after: Benjamin Franklin Pearrygin
- Website: Official website

Pearrygin Lake State Park is a public recreation area in the Methow Valley located two miles (3.2 km) east of Winthrop in Okanogan County, Washington. The state park covers 1,186 acres (480 ha) that almost entirely surround Pearrygin Lake, giving it 11,000 feet (3,400 m) of shoreline. Park activities include camping, boating, fishing, swimming, water sports, and cross-country skiing. The park's hiking trails include the 3.1-mile (5.0 km) Rex Derr trail, which is named for a former director of the State Parks and Recreation Commission.
