= Winthrop, Washington =

- Town
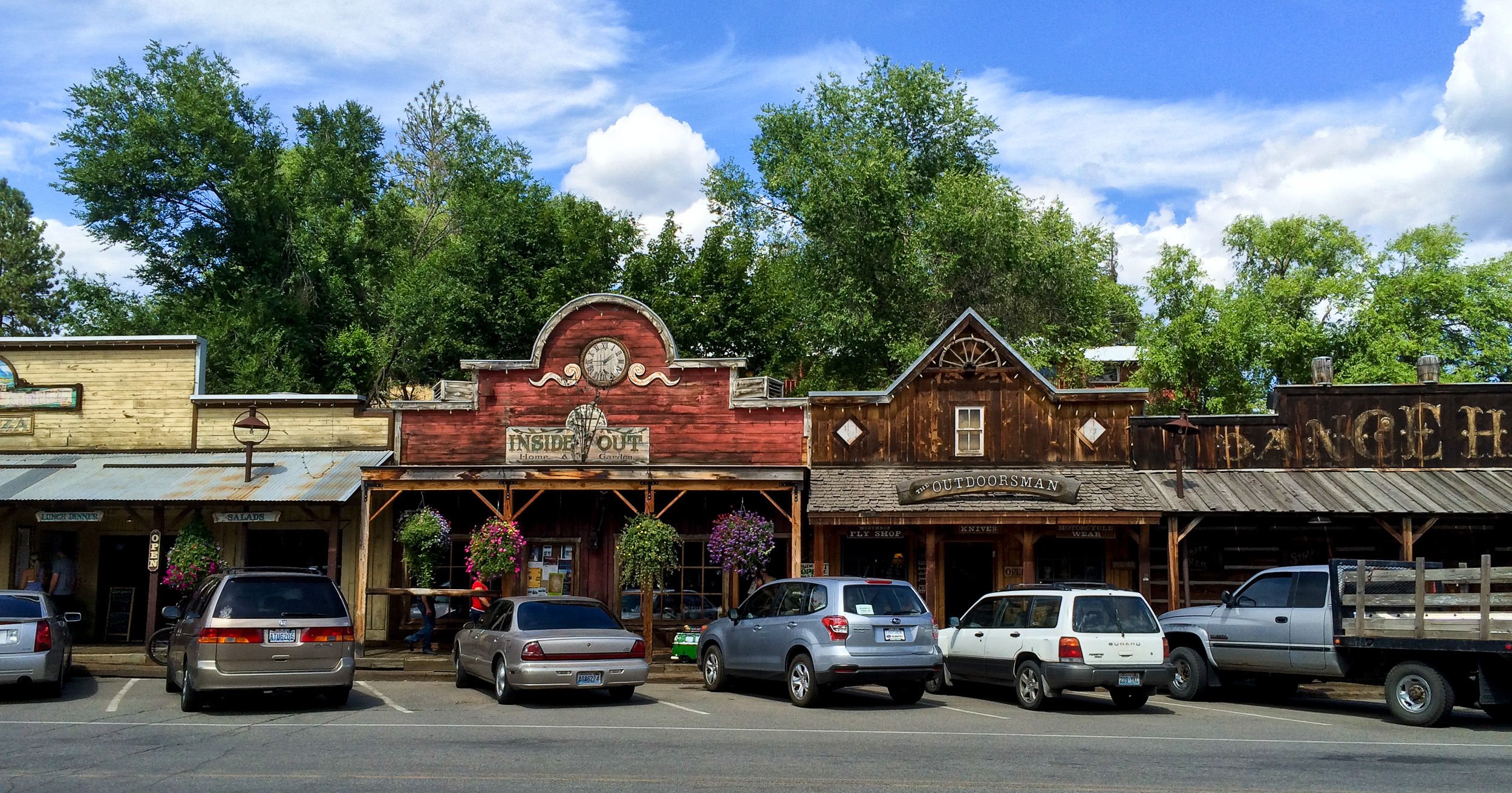
- Old West-style storefronts in Winthrop

- Location of Winthrop, Washington
- Coordinates: 48°28′18″N 120°10′45″W
- Country: United States
- State: Washington
- County: Okanogan
- Incorporated: March 12, 1924

Government
  - Type: Mayor–council
  - Mayor: Sally Ranzau

Area
  - Total: 0.93 sq mi (2.42 km^{2})
  - Land: 0.93 sq mi (2.42 km^{2})
  - Water: 0 sq mi (0.00 km^{2})
- Elevation: 1,745 ft (532 m)

Population (2020)
  - Total: 504
  - Estimate (2024): 603
  - Density: 539/sq mi (208/km^{2})
- Time zone: UTC-8 (Pacific (PST))
  - Summer (DST): UTC-7 (PDT)
- ZIP code: 98862
- Area code: 509
- FIPS code: 53-79380
- GNIS feature ID: 2413503
- Website: townofwinthrop.com

Winthrop is a town in Okanogan County, Washington, United States. It is located on the North Cascades Highway, east of Mazama and north of Twisp. The town's population was 504 at the 2020 census. Winthrop lies at the confluence of the Methow and Chewuch rivers near the eastern foothills of the Cascade Mountains.

The town was founded in 1890 after the Methow Valley, the homeland of the indigenous Methow people, was opened to white settlement. Winthrop was named for author and explorer Theodore Winthrop, who visited Washington Territory in the 1860s. The town was incorporated in 1924 and continues to operate under a mayor–council government.

Winthrop adopted an Old West theme for its downtown architecture in 1971 to prepare for the opening of the North Cascades Highway. The town is a regional tourist attraction and is also a base for outdoor recreation.

== History ==
=== Prehistory and early settlement ===
Native Americans, including the Methow people, were the first inhabitants of Winthrop, with evidence of human habitation at least 8,000 to 10,000 years before present. They lived along the banks of the Methow and Chewuch rivers, where they harvested camas root and berries, fished, and hunted. The Methow had seasonal camps and returned annually to the upper valley in the summer once they acquired horses in the 18th century. The Columbia Plateau peoples, including the Methow and Syilx, established routes over Cascade Pass to trade with Coast Salish tribes in modern-day Skagit Valley. The population of the Methow people and other Columbia Plateau tribes were devastated by smallpox epidemics by the 19th century. The tribes under the leadership of Chief Moses were assigned by the federal government to the Columbia Reservation in 1879, which included the Methow Valley.

The Columbia Reservation was dissolved by the federal government in 1883 to allow for white settlement of the Methow Valley, which was opened on May 1, 1886. The Methow people were then moved further east to the Colville Indian Reservation. The first white residents of the valley were brothers Tom and Jim Robinson, who had a hunting camp at the confluence but later left. A homestead near the modern-day town was claimed in 1887 by James Sullivan and Louisa Sullivan, who built the first hotel in the area; they were followed in 1888 by Walter Frisbee, who established a trading post and blacksmith shop. The Chiliwist Trail between the Okanogan and Methow valleys was the main transportation corridor for the area but was unsuited to wagon travel; it was replaced in 1891 by a pair of new roads funded by settlers in the area that allowed for stagecoach service connecting to Brewster on the Columbia River.

=== Founding and development ===
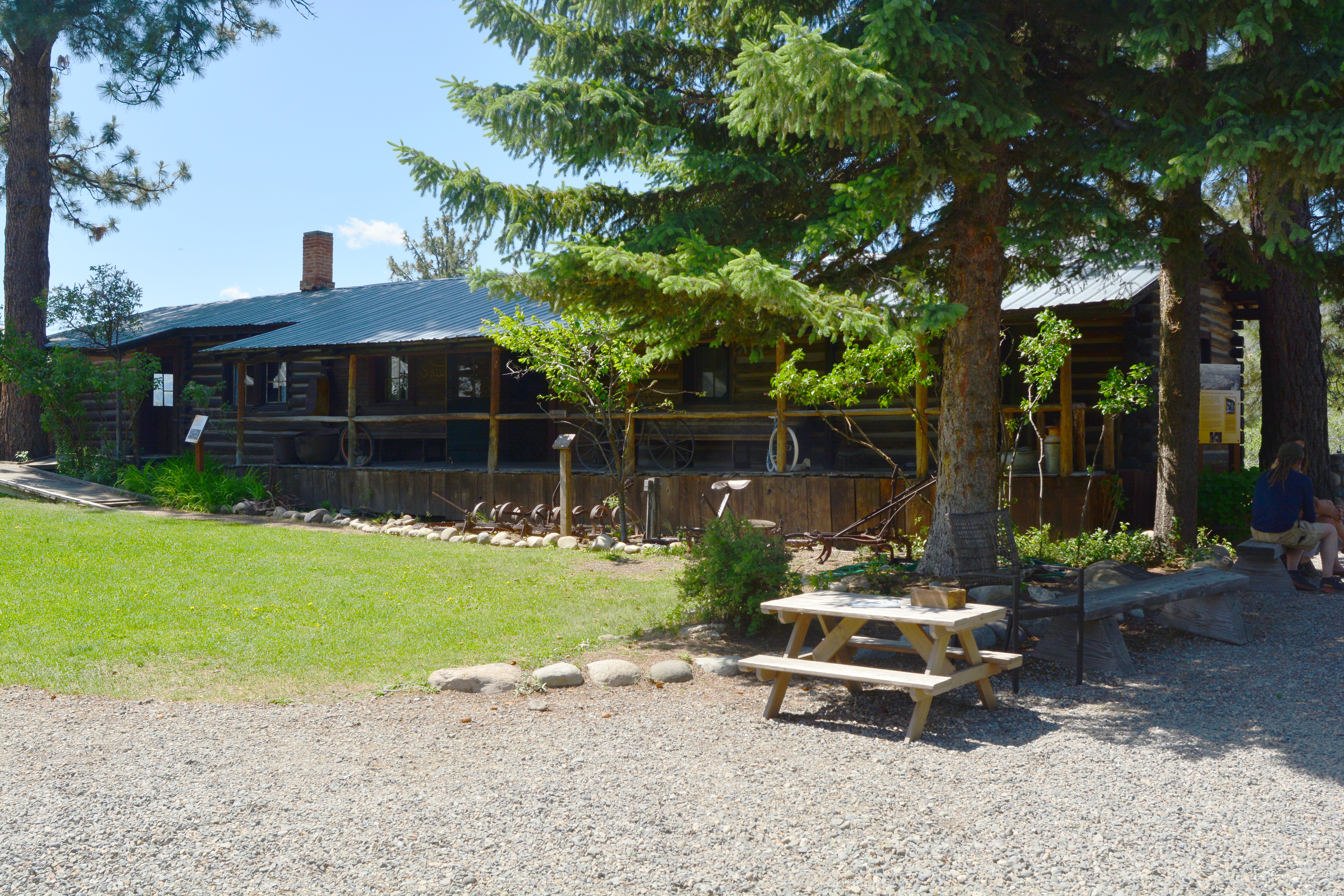
Guy Waring's Winthrop cabin, now home to the Shafer Museum

The town of Winthrop was founded in 1890 by local settlers. The namesake, according to U.S. Congressman John L. Wilson, is author and explorer Theodore Winthrop, who had published the memoir The Canoe and the Saddle in 1862 after a visit to Washington Territory. The town's first trading post and general store was opened in January 1892 by Guy Waring of Boston, who moved with his family to the confluence of the Chewuch and Methow rivers a year before. He took over the Winthrop post office, which had been established on June 18, 1891, and unsuccessfully attempted to rename the town "Waring" despite local backlash. Waring left the Methow Valley for several years during the economic depression to raise $15,000 in funds for a new venture, the Methow Trading Company. His company acquired almost all of the buildings in the town and opened various businesses, including a sawmill, gristmill, and a hotel. Waring built a spacious new home, named the "Castle" by local residents, on a hillside overlooking Winthrop; it now serves as the home of the Shafer Museum.

Gold was discovered northwest of the Methow Valley near Harts Pass in 1892 and caused a gold rush that brought 1,000 people to the small settlement of Barron. Winthrop remained the main hub of the upper valley with an industry centered around cattle ranching, logging, and supplying nearby mines. Waring opened the Duck Brand Saloon in 1891 and instituted unusually strict rules that required drunk patrons to leave and prohibited bartenders from talking to patrons. The saloon was among the only structures to survive a major fire in 1893 that destroyed the town but closed in 1910; it was later converted into the town hall. Owen Wister, Waring's former roommate at Harvard University, wrote The Virginian, considered the first American western novel, after honeymooning in Winthrop in 1892 and 1898. Waring continued to expand his business with branch stores in several mining towns as well as Pateros and Twisp.

Most of the Methow Valley was incorporated into the Washington Forest Reserve by an executive order signed by President Grover Cleveland on February 22, 1897. The order prevented further settlement and development of the area around Winthrop, but residents protested due to the area's existing use for agriculture; it was modified in 1901 to remove the valley from the protected area. The townsite of Winthrop was formally platted by the Methow Trading Company in 1897 and approved by the county government in 1901. A rival town to the south named Heckendorn was platted in 1904 and had several businesses that eroded Waring's monopoly on the upper Methow Valley. A new road along the Methow River from Pateros to the town and upper valley was completed by the state government in 1909 using convict labor and modern construction methods. In the 1910s, Winthrop gained telephone service, a newspaper named the Winthrop Eagle, a school, and a bank. Waring left the area in 1917 after losing control of the Methow Trading Company and a failed attempt at ranching. He sold his "Castle", which was used by a local Episcopal Church and later as a private residence. The U.S. Forest Service opened a ranger station in the town that same year.

=== Incorporation and growth ===
Winthrop was incorporated on March 12, 1924, and included the downriver settlement of Heckendorn and a plot of land across the Methow River. The town was threatened by major floods of the river in 1916, 1933, and 1948 that destroyed homes and bridges. The U.S. Fish & Wildlife Service opened the Winthrop National Fish Hatchery on the Methow River in 1942, which produced salmon and trout to be stocked at local lakes and released into the river. The area around Winthrop developed into a destination for outdoor recreation in the middle of the 20th century with the opening of several dude ranches and resorts. The Sunny M Ranch was established in the 1930s west of the town and expanded under various owners into the Sun Mountain Lodge, which opened in 1968 and encompasses 3,000 acres (1,200 ha) and a luxury hotel.

Plans to build an open pit mine for copper as well as a ski resort, named Early Winters Ski Resort, near Mazama were announced in the 1970s but never realized. The town later annexed 75 acres (30 ha) southwest of the Methow River that would include new residential areas and an industrial zone.

=== Westernization project ===
The first plans to build an automobile route across the North Cascades from Bellingham Bay to the Columbia River were approved by the state legislature in 1893. Construction of the final 30 miles (48 km) across the mountains did not begin until 1961 and was opened to traffic on September 2, 1972. In anticipation of the new highway and the projected tourist traffic through the town, a large-scale remodeling project was approved in 1971 with funding from local businesses organized by sawmill operator Otto Wagner and his wife Kathryn. A two-block section of downtown was rebuilt to use 1890s Old West architecture, including false fronts and a wooden boardwalk; by September 1972, 22 buildings had been remodeled. The early design work was contracted to Robert Jorgensen, one of the designers of the Bavarian theme town in Leavenworth, and the project was estimated to cost over $350,000. A design review board was established to maintain the architectural theme, enforced by a "Westernization" ordinance. The wooden façade of the Winthrop Emporium, a major tourist store, was destroyed in a fire in November 1993 and rebuilt the following year. The town's landmark bell was saved from the fire.

== Geography ==
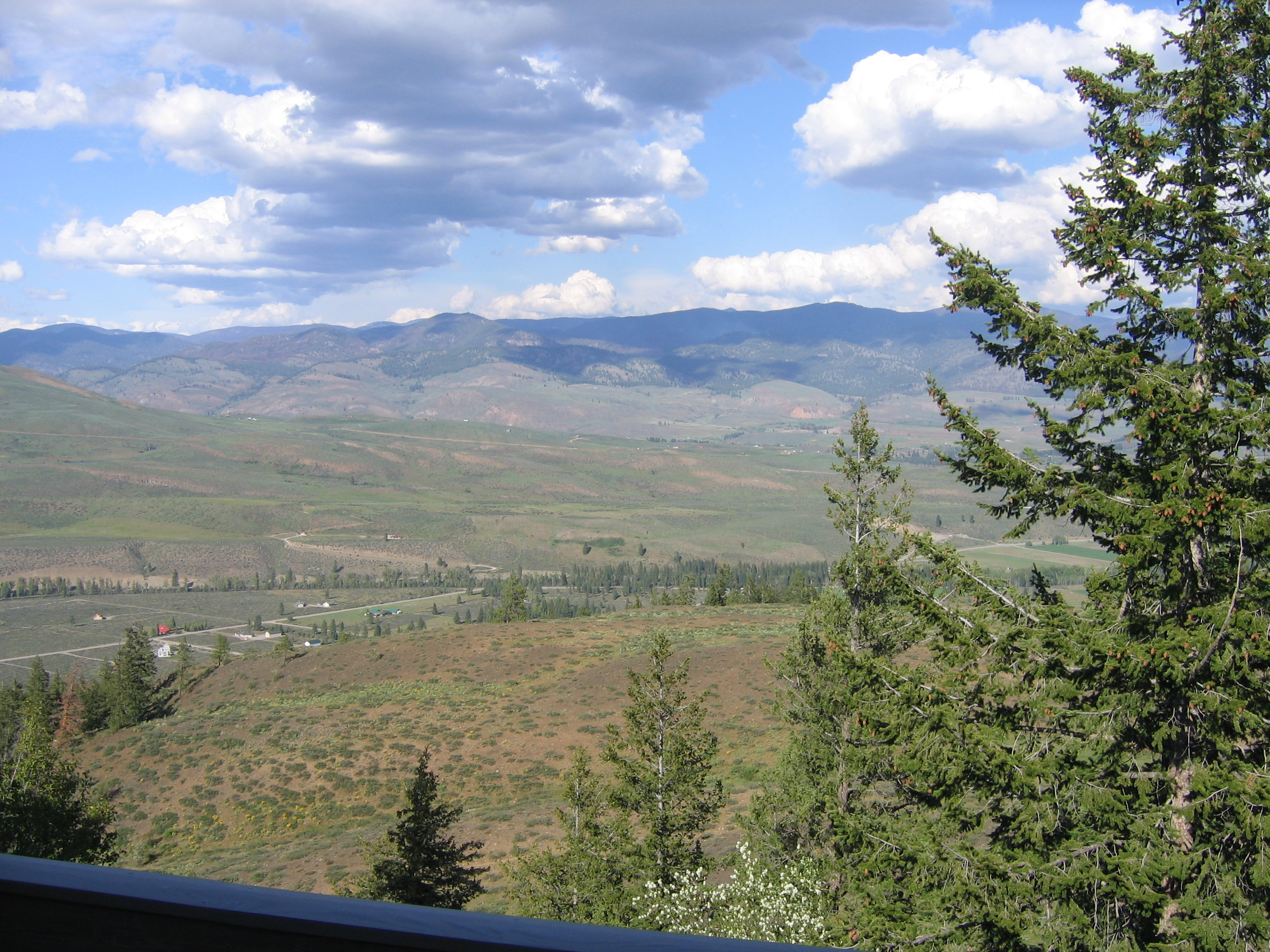
Hills surrounding Winthrop and the Methow Valley

Winthrop lies in western Okanogan County at the confluence of the Methow and Chewuch rivers in the Methow Valley. The town is in the eastern foothills of the Cascade Mountains at an elevation of 1,745 feet (532 m). According to the United States Census Bureau, Winthrop has an area of 0.93 square miles (2.41 km^{2}), all land. As of 2015, there are approximately 722 parcels in the town, of which 258 are single-family homes and 279 are undeveloped. The Okanogan–Wenatchee National Forest and state-managed Methow Wildlife Area surround the Methow Valley. The area includes sandstone formations as well as features that were formed by volcanic activity.

=== Climate ===
Like most of northeastern Washington, Winthrop has a humid continental climate (Köppen Dsb), with cold, snowy winters and very warm summers with cool nights and little rainfall. In the winter, temperatures in the Methow Valley regularly drop below 0 °F (−17.8 °C), but are also able to reach as high as 71 °F (21.7 °C) due to warm Chinook winds. Winthrop and Mazama recorded the coldest temperature ever measured in Washington state at −48 °F (−44.4 °C) on December 30, 1968. Winthrop also has the coldest average month in the state, with January minimum temperatures at 15.4 °F (−9.2 °C). The hottest temperature recorded in Winthrop was 109 °F (42.8 °C) on June 30, 2021, during a regional heat dome event.

Western Okanogan County is prone to wildfires in the summer, which can shut down the North Cascades Highway as well as local businesses reliant on tourism. The 2021 wildfire season included two major fires in the Methow Valley that caused long-term evacuations and smoke inundation. The Cedar Creek and Cub Creek fires both started in early July and were contained by September after burning a combined 113,000 acres (46,000 ha). By late July, the air quality index in Winthrop had reached as high as 429—the worst in the United States—and was compared to Mordor from The Lord of the Rings by a National Weather Service office. The following month, Illinois-based Instant Brands donated 2,000 air purifiers to the town to be distributed to residents. A wildfire in late June 2026 resulted in an evacuation notice to be issued for central Winthrop by the county government.

Climate data for Winthrop, Washington, 1991–2020, extremes 1906–present
Month	Jan	Feb	Mar	Apr	May	Jun	Jul	Aug	Sep	Oct	Nov	Dec	Year
Record high °F (°C)	57 (14)	62 (17)	79 (26)	89 (32)	100 (38)	109 (43)	106 (41)	105 (41)	102 (39)	88 (31)	68 (20)	70 (21)	109 (43)
Mean maximum °F (°C)	43.2 (6.2)	49.1 (9.5)	63.4 (17.4)	75.3 (24.1)	86.3 (30.2)	90.6 (32.6)	97.0 (36.1)	97.3 (36.3)	90.2 (32.3)	76.3 (24.6)	55.4 (13.0)	41.4 (5.2)	98.9 (37.2)
Mean daily maximum °F (°C)	29.9 (−1.2)	38.4 (3.6)	50.0 (10.0)	61.1 (16.2)	71.1 (21.7)	76.7 (24.8)	85.8 (29.9)	85.6 (29.8)	77.0 (25.0)	60.9 (16.1)	41.2 (5.1)	29.2 (−1.6)	58.9 (15.0)
Daily mean °F (°C)	22.6 (−5.2)	28.2 (−2.1)	37.7 (3.2)	46.7 (8.2)	55.4 (13.0)	61.3 (16.3)	68.3 (20.2)	67.5 (19.7)	59.1 (15.1)	46.4 (8.0)	32.9 (0.5)	22.3 (−5.4)	45.7 (7.6)
Mean daily minimum °F (°C)	15.4 (−9.2)	18.0 (−7.8)	25.4 (−3.7)	32.2 (0.1)	39.7 (4.3)	45.9 (7.7)	50.8 (10.4)	49.3 (9.6)	41.2 (5.1)	31.9 (−0.1)	24.5 (−4.2)	15.4 (−9.2)	32.5 (0.3)
Mean minimum °F (°C)	−6.7 (−21.5)	1.3 (−17.1)	12.4 (−10.9)	22.9 (−5.1)	28.2 (−2.1)	36.7 (2.6)	42.1 (5.6)	39.9 (4.4)	30.3 (−0.9)	19.5 (−6.9)	7.9 (−13.4)	−2.7 (−19.3)	−10.4 (−23.6)
Record low °F (°C)	−32 (−36)	−28 (−33)	−11 (−24)	13 (−11)	20 (−7)	28 (−2)	31 (−1)	28 (−2)	18 (−8)	5 (−15)	−17 (−27)	−48 (−44)	−48 (−44)
Average precipitation inches (mm)	2.06 (52)	1.28 (33)	1.23 (31)	0.84 (21)	1.13 (29)	1.09 (28)	0.69 (18)	0.45 (11)	0.45 (11)	1.37 (35)	2.03 (52)	2.57 (65)	15.19 (386)
Average snowfall inches (cm)	16.6 (42)	8.8 (22)	3.4 (8.6)	0.1 (0.25)	0.0 (0.0)	0.0 (0.0)	0.0 (0.0)	0.0 (0.0)	0.0 (0.0)	1.1 (2.8)	7.6 (19)	21.8 (55)	59.4 (149.65)
Average extreme snow depth inches (cm)	21.7 (55)	19.8 (50)	14.1 (36)	0.3 (0.76)	0.0 (0.0)	0.0 (0.0)	0.0 (0.0)	0.0 (0.0)	0.0 (0.0)	0.8 (2.0)	5.1 (13)	15.4 (39)	23.5 (60)
Average precipitation days (≥ 0.01 in)	12.3	8.7	7.9	6.5	7.6	7.3	4.4	3.8	4.3	8.5	12.3	13.3	96.9
Average snowy days (≥ 0.1 in)	10.1	5.0	2.1	0.2	0.0	0.0	0.0	0.0	0.0	0.5	4.6	11.7	34.2
Source 1: NOAA
Source 2: National Weather Service

== Economy ==
The economy of Winthrop, like other areas of the Methow Valley, historically relied on mining and logging alongside agriculture but later transitioned to tourism and outdoor recreation. Winthrop is known for the American Old West design of all its buildings, making it a tourist destination. The town theme idea was inspired by the example of Leavenworth, Washington, which in turn was heavily based on Solvang, California. The town had a total of 109,000 visitors recorded in 2017; during the COVID-19 pandemic, an estimated 477,000 visitors stayed overnight in the Methow Valley and contributed $69.7 million to the local economy despite travel restrictions. Among its businesses is Three Fingered Jack's, a saloon that opened in 1972 and was fined by the state government for using the term "saloon", which was not legalized for bars until 1979.

As of the 2023 American Community Survey estimates, a total of 166 residents in Winthrop over the age of 16 are in the labor force and 1.0 percent are unemployed. The most common employers are in the retail sector, followed by construction, and professional and administrative services. Approximately 68.1 percent are privately employed, with 17.2 percent are public sector workers and 14.7 percent are self-employed. The median household income in 2023 was estimated at $63,750. Approximately 19 percent of Winthrop residents are employed within the town; the mean one-way commute for the local workforce was 14.3 minutes and 89.6 percent of commuters drove alone to their place of employment. Winthrop and other areas of the Methow Valley experienced a large influx of higher-income households with remote workers in the early 2020s, including long-term relocations to existing vacation homes.

== Demographics ==
Historical population
Census	Pop.	Note	%±
1930	270		—
1940	365		35.2%
1950	396		8.5%
1960	359		−9.3%
1970	371		3.3%
1980	413		11.3%
1990	302		−26.9%
2000	349		15.6%
2010	394		12.9%
2020	504		27.9%
2024 (est.)	603	▲	19.6%
Sources: U.S. Decennial Census; 2020 Census

Winthrop is among the least populous municipalities in Okanogan County, ranked ninth in the 2020 census with a population of 504 people. The state government estimated that the town's 2023 population rose by 15.4 percent to 578 residents, among the fastest rates in Washington.

=== 2020 census ===
As of the 2020 census, there were 504 people and 268 households living within Winthrop's town limits. The town's population density was 541.9 inhabitants per square mile (209.2/km^{2}). There were 342 total housing units, of which 78.4% were occupied and 21.6% were vacant or for occasional use. The racial makeup of Winthrop was 90.1% White, 0.4% Black or African American, 0.8% Native American and Alaska Native, 0.0% Asian, 0.0% Pacific Islander, and 3.4% from other races. Residents who identified as more than one race were 5.4% of the population. Hispanic or Latino residents of any race were 6.7% of the population.

Of the 268 households in Winthrop, 22.0% had children under the age of 18 living with them, 35.1% were married couples living together, and 8.6% were cohabitating but unmarried. Households with a male householder with no spouse or partner were 22.8% of the population, while households with a female householder with no spouse or partner were 33.6% of the population. Out of all households, 38.4% had residents who were 65 years of age or older. There were 268 occupied housing units in Winthrop, of which 66.4% were owner-occupied and 33.6% were occupied by renters.

The median age in the town was 51.1 years old for all sexes, 46.0 years old for males, and 54.4 years old for females. Of the total population, 16.4% of residents were under the age of 19; 2.4% were between the ages of 20 and 24; 24.2% were between the ages of 25 and 44; 27.0% were between the ages of 45 and 64; and 30.2% were 65 years of age or older. The gender makeup of the town was 49.6% male and 50.4% female.

=== 2010 census ===
As of the 2010 census, there were 394 people, 205 households, and 109 families residing in the town. The population density was 419.1 inhabitants per square mile (161.8/km^{2}). There were 300 housing units at an average density of 319.1 per square mile (123.2/km^{2}). The racial makeup of the town was 97.5% White, 0.5% African American, 0.3% Asian, 0.8% from other races, and 1.0% from two or more races. Hispanic or Latino of any race were 4.3% of the population.

There were 205 households, of which 22.0% had children under the age of 18 living with them, 40.0% were married couples living together, 9.8% had a female householder with no husband present, 3.4% had a male householder with no wife present, and 46.8% were non-families. 43.4% of all households were made up of individuals, and 16.6% had someone living alone who was 65 years of age or older. The average household size was 1.92 and the average family size was 2.59.

The median age in the town was 47.9 years. 17.8% of residents were under the age of 18; 6.1% were between the ages of 18 and 24; 21.8% were from 25 to 44; 35.4% were from 45 to 64; and 19% were 65 years of age or older. The gender makeup of the town was 49.0% male and 51.0% female.

== Government ==
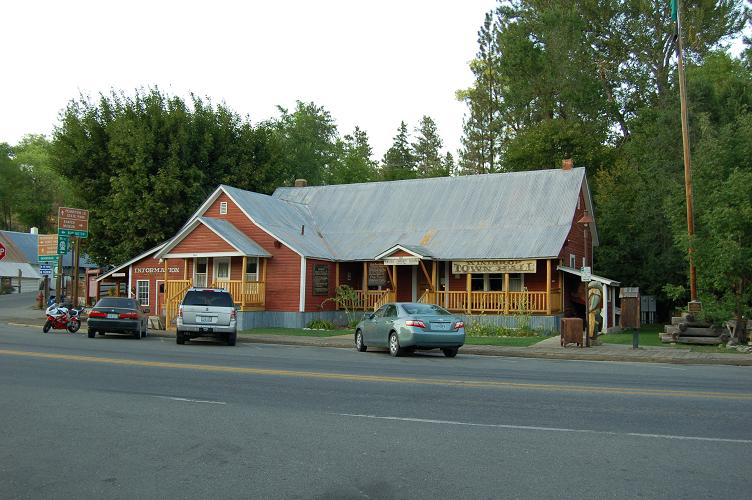
Winthrop's town hall

Winthrop is a town with a mayor–council government. The mayor and five members of the town council are elected to four-year terms; since 2018, Sally Ranzau has been mayor of Winthrop. The town council convenes at meetings held twice a month at the Winthrop Barn. The Westernization Design Review Board is a council-appointed board that oversees the design and architecture of buildings in Winthrop and enforces the "Old West" theme adopted in the 1970s. As of 2019, 57 percent of the town government's budget was derived from sales tax revenue, the second-highest rate in Washington behind Friday Harbor in the San Juan Islands.

The town's police department is led by a marshal with the powers of a police chief. The municipal court handles cases involving Winthrop and neighboring Twisp through a temporary agreement signed in 2025. Winthrop contracts with Okanogan Fire District 6 to provide firefighting services; the town's own fire department was disbanded in 2006 in favor of the contracted service. Fire District 6 operates Winthrop's fire station, which opened in 2022 to replace a smaller facility on Englar Street.

== Culture ==
=== Media ===
The Methow Valley News is the official newspaper of record for the town government and is published weekly in Twisp. It was founded in 1903 and had a circulation of 3,400 in 2013. The Methow Valley Journal, also known as the Winthrop Journal, was published in Winthrop by Bill Brinkerhoff from 1912 to 1942.

Winthrop's public library is operated by NCW Libraries, a regional system that serves three counties in Central Washington. The original library was a small building at Mack Lloyd Park that was routinely overcrowded and had the highest per-capita use in the system. Plans to build a larger library were led by a non-profit organization that formed in 2017 to raise funds for the project. The Winthrop Library opened on June 11, 2022, and is owned by the town government. The 7,300-square-foot (680 m^{2}) building has six times more floor space than the former library and includes public art, meeting rooms, and a kitchen. It cost $6.5 million to construct with funding from donations and a state grant. The former library was converted into a visitor center by the town government and local chamber of commerce in 2023.

=== Events ===
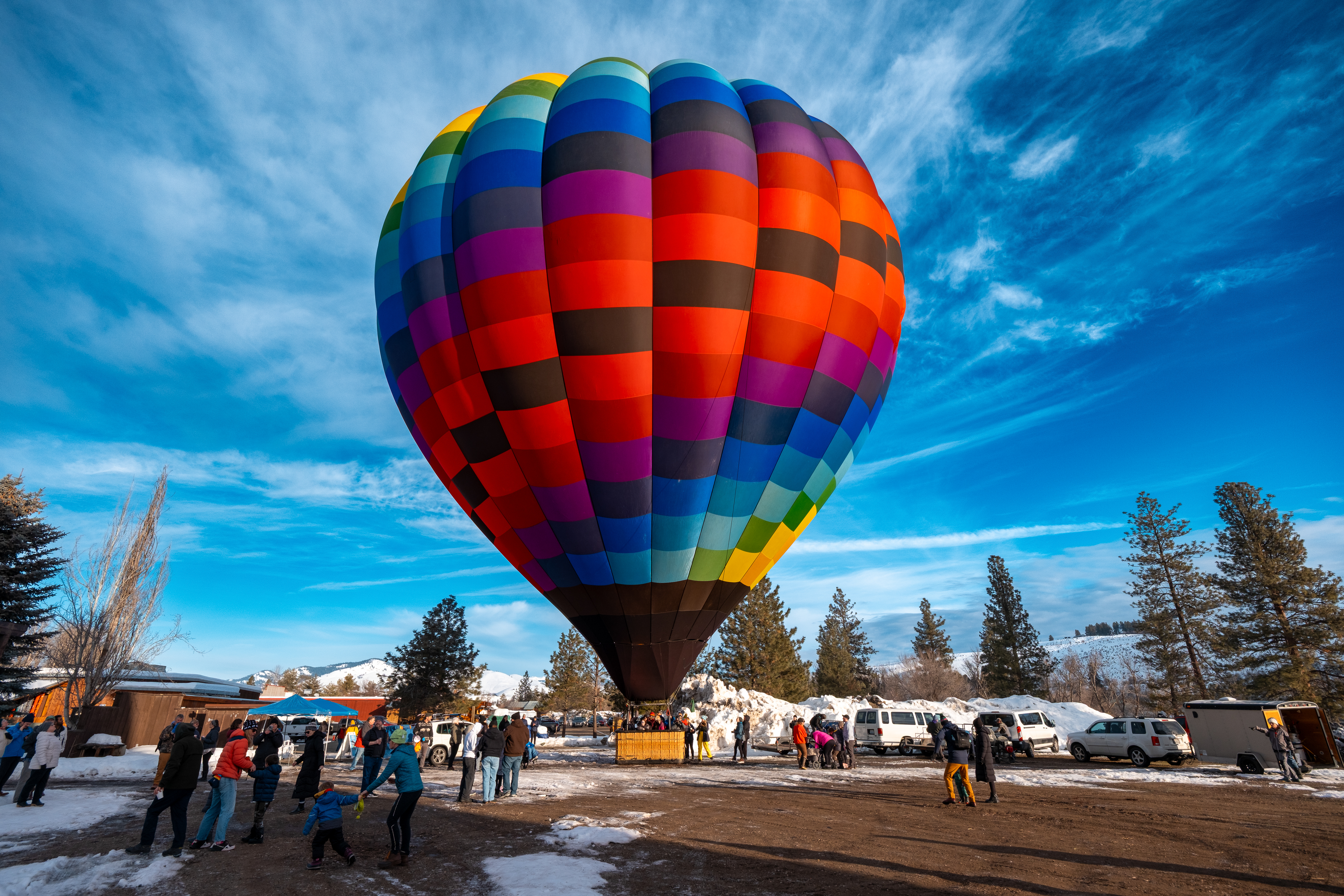
A hot air balloon at the 2025 Balloon Roundup in Winthrop

Winthrop hosts the annual "Winthrop Balloon Roundup", a three‑day hot air ballooning festival held in the late winter months, typically scheduled for the first weekend of March. The Methow Valley had been identified as a suitable location for year-round hot-air ballooning in the 1980s and the Balloon Roundup was first held in 1997 as a hobbyist event for pilots. The festival expanded into a public event with no admission fee supplemented by paid events, including rides. The Balloon Roundup includes morning rides along the Methow River, an evening "Balloon Glow" with tethered and stationary displays, and other events.

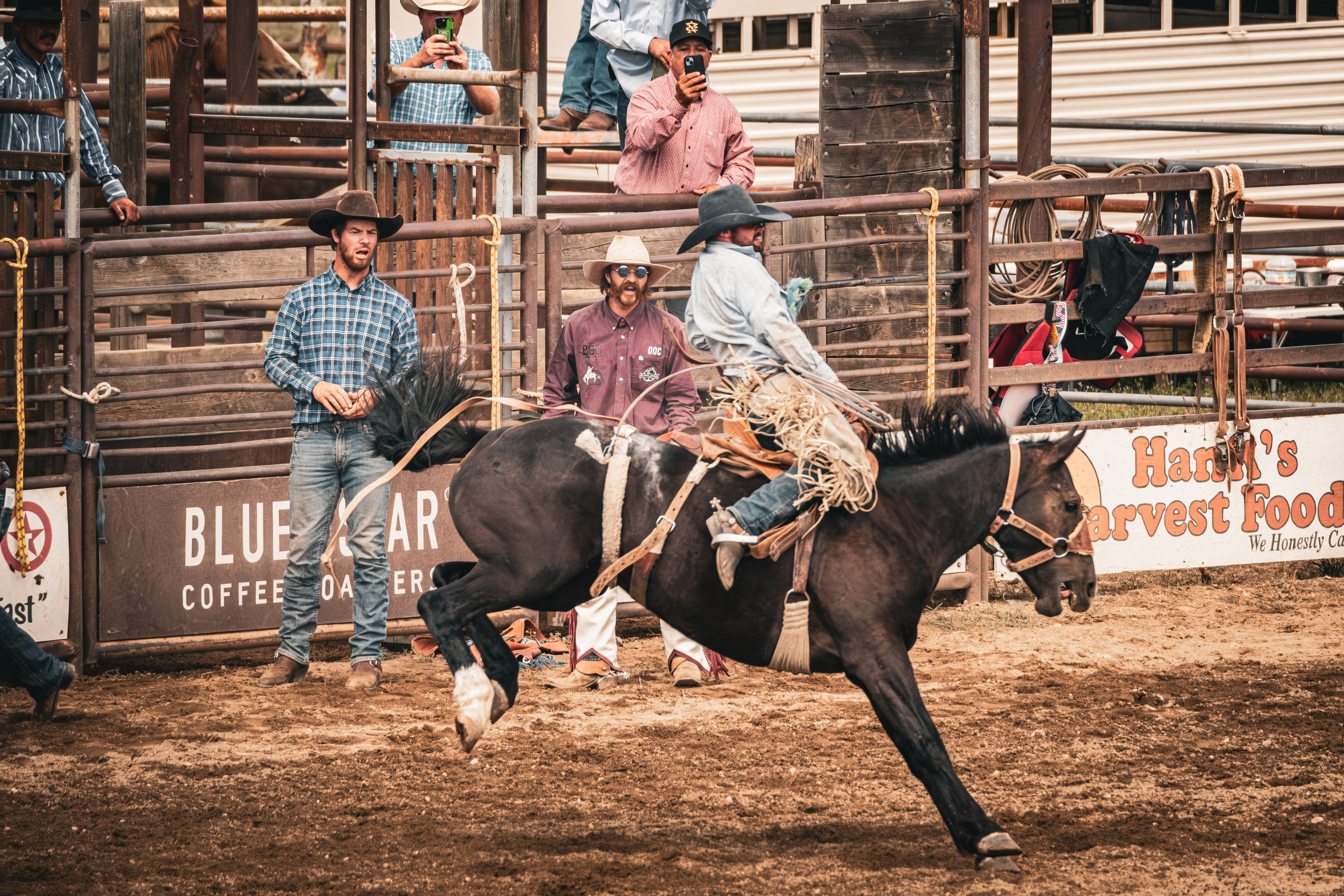
Saddle bronc rider at the Methow Valley Rodeo in Winthrop, Washington.

An annual spring festival, the '49er Days, was established in 1945 and includes a street parade, banquets, line dancing, carnival rides, and horse-riding excursions. The event is scheduled for the weeks after the North Cascade Highway reopens for seasonal travel, which typically happens in April or early May. Other events include the Winthrop Rhythm and Blues Festival, the Methow Valley Chamber Music Festival, and the Labor Day Rodeo.

== Parks and recreation ==
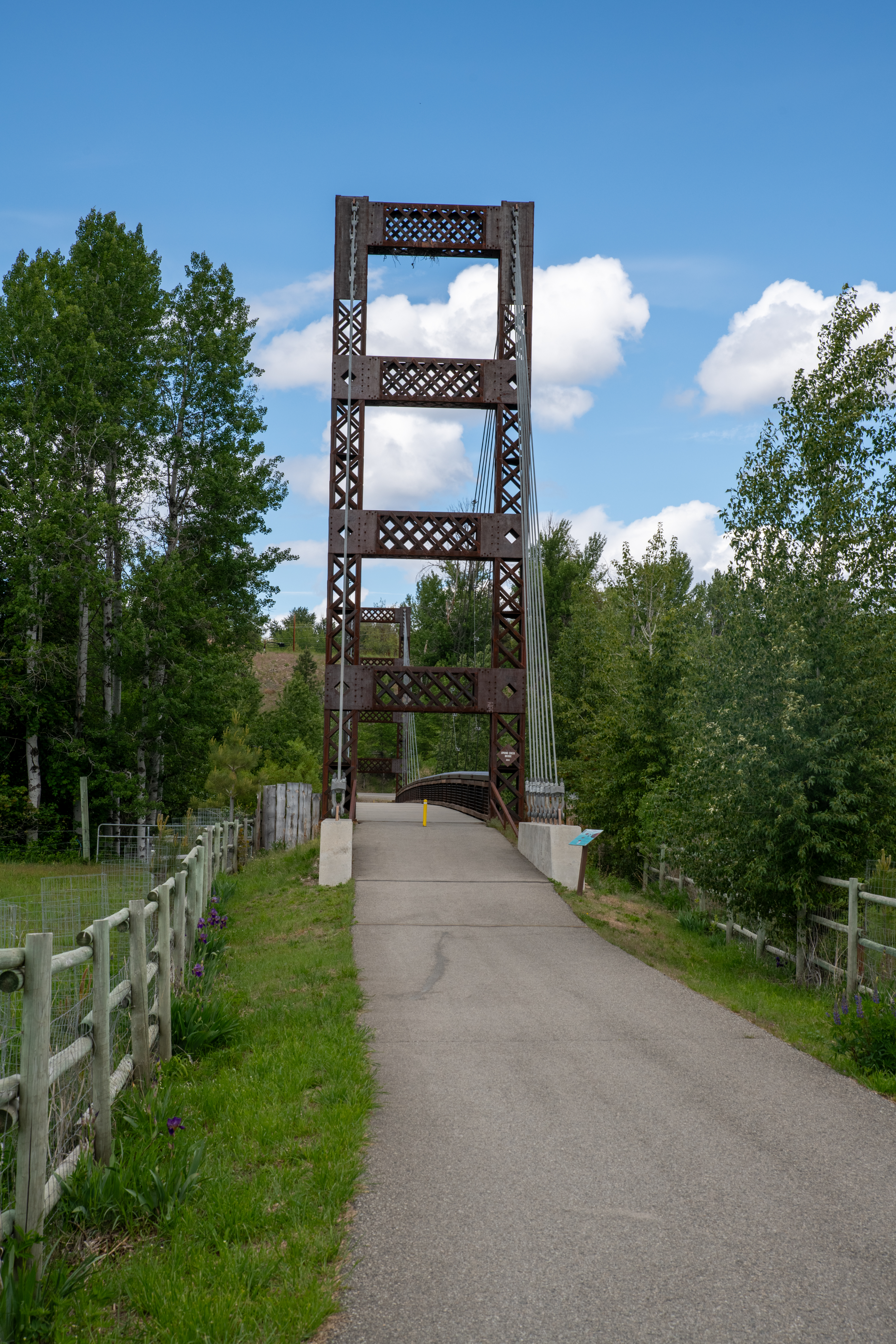
The Spring Creek Bridge, constructed over the Methow River in 2011 to connect local trails in Winthrop

Winthrop's government owns and operates several parks and recreational facilities within the town proper that are used for community gatherings and other events. Mack Lloyd Park is the town's largest, at 18 acres (7.3 ha), and is located west of downtown. It includes a memorial for fallen firefighters, a visitors' center, picnic tables, a bandshell, tennis courts, and a baseball field. An adjacent events center, named the "Barn", is 6,500 square feet (600 m^{2}) and used for community events, concerts, and weddings. It was constructed in 1931 from a Quonset hut and rebuilt in 1971 after its roof collapsed in a snowstorm; the facility was managed by a non-profit organization until the town government took over operations in 2022. Another major town facility is a seasonal ice rink that includes an indoor changing area.

The town also has two small parks that have been developed for recreational uses: Confluence Park, which was acquired through a donation in 2016; and Heckendorn Park, which has a playground and basketball court that were constructed by a local Kiwanis club. The town plans to construct a riverwalk trail through downtown to connect local attractions. The Spring Creek Bridge, a cable-stayed pedestrian bridge over the Methow River, was built in 2011 as part of a trail network for downtown Winthrop. The Okanogan County government owns Sa Teekh Wa Park, a 12-acre (4.9 ha) open space on the west side of the Chewuch River within the town boundaries that is connected by a pedestrian bridge over the river. The county government has proposed transferring the park to the Winthrop town government due to a lack of maintenance funding.

Winthrop's nearest state park is Pearrygin Lake to the northeast, which includes over 1,200 acres (490 ha) of recreational areas for swimming, boating, and fishing. It was developed into a winter sports area in the 2010s with the addition of trails for cross-country skiing, snowmobiling, and winter fatbiking within the designated Sno-Park. The upper Methow Valley has 120 miles (190 km) of groomed cross-country skiing trails that radiate out from the nearby community of Mazama. The Okanogan–Wenatchee National Forest, which surrounds the valley, has designated areas for hiking, camping, hunting, and fishing.

== Education ==
The town is served by the Methow Valley School District, which was established from a consolidation of the Twisp and Winthrop school districts in 1973. The school district's campus, located between the two towns, comprises Liberty Bell Junior-Senior High School and Methow Valley Elementary.

== Infrastructure ==
=== Transportation ===
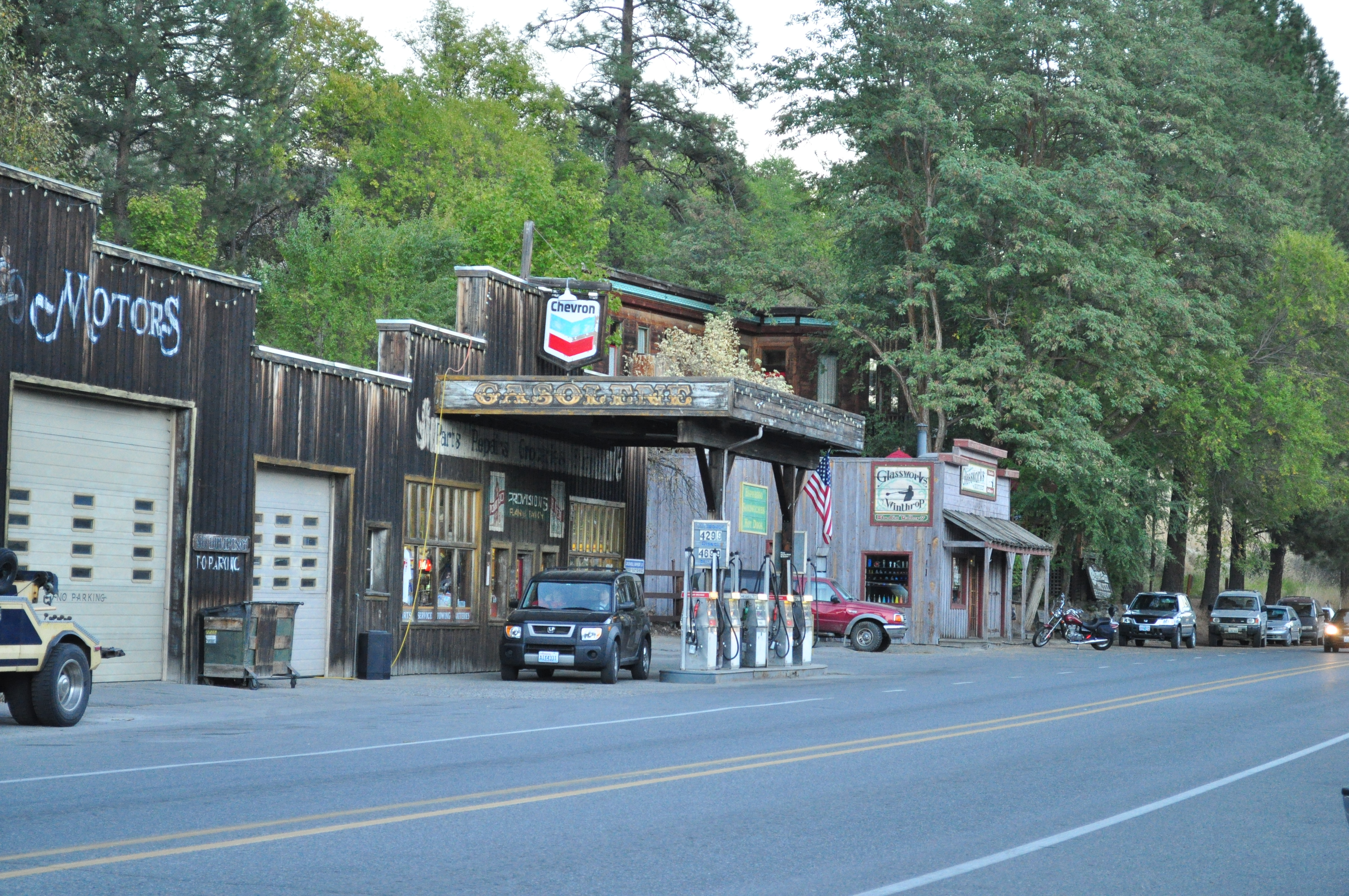
Riverside Avenue, which carries State Route 20 through downtown Winthrop

Winthrop is bisected by State Route 20, also known as the North Cascades Highway, which closes annually during the winter months between Ross Dam near Diablo and Silver Star Creek near Mazama. State Route 20 follows Riverside Avenue through the town and crosses the Methow River on a truss bridge that was built in 1929. The highway connects Winthrop to North Cascades National Park and the Skagit Valley to the west and Omak to the east. In 2023, State Route 20 carried a daily average of 4,700 vehicles at the Methow River Bridge. As of 2012, there are a total of 459 public parking spaces on streets in Winthrop and in off-street lots. Public transit service is provided by TranGO, which operates buses from Winthrop to Mazama, Twisp, Carlton, and Pateros every 2 hours with onward connections to other cities in Okanogan County. The route was originally limited to Winthrop, Twisp, and Pateros when it launched in 2016, but was extended to Mazama in 2023.

Methow Valley State Airport is located 5 miles (8.0 km) south of Winthrop and is owned by the Washington State Department of Transportation (WSDOT). It has a 5,049-foot (1,539 m) asphalt runway and is listed in the National Plan of Integrated Airport Systems maintained by the Federal Aviation Administration. The U.S. Forest Service constructed the airstrip in the 1930s and used it as one of the first facilities to train smokejumpers for wildland firefighting beginning in 1939. It was officially designated for smokejumper use in 1945 and had expanded facilities constructed until the primary training center was moved to Redmond, Oregon, in 1981.

=== Utilities ===
Electric power in the town and surrounding area is provided by the Okanogan County Electric Co-op (OCEC), a nonprofit cooperative that serves northwestern Okanogan County rather than the Okanogan County Public Utility District. OCEC, which is headquartered near Winthrop, was founded in 1939 and primarily purchases its electricity from the federal Bonneville Power Administration, which manages several hydroelectric dams in the Pacific Northwest. The cooperative has a subsidiary that delivers propane for heating and acquired a local internet service provider, Methownet, in 2024. Landline telephone service is provided by CenturyLink, while several carriers have mobile broadband service in the area. A 2018 proposal to allow solar arrays on buildings in downtown Winthrop resulted in most members of the town's Westernization design review board resigning in protest. The town government allowed the installation of solar panels at the Winthrop Library in 2024 and a local church in 2025.

The town government maintains a water system that supplies drinking water to residents and businesses within Winthrop. The town sources its water from a well and has 11 miles (18 km) of pipes in its water distribution system, which also includes a storage reservoir and a pump station. Winthrop also sells its water for firefighting but does not regularly supply residents outside of the town limits who rely on their own wells; the town had conservation restrictions on water use during periods of prolonged droughts prior to upgrades to the water system made in the 1990s. The number of customers supplied by Winthrop's water system is also managed by the Washington State Department of Health, which places a cap on the number of authorized connections.

Winthrop's sanitary sewer system was constructed in 1971 and expanded to 11.1 miles (17.9 km) by 2015, with service to Sun Mountain Resort and other areas outside the town itself. The wastewater treatment plant south of the town has an aerated lagoon and chlorination system that discharges treated water into the Methow River. The plant was upgraded in 1992 and is planned to be replaced by an adjacent facility with a sludge treatment system by 2027. Solid waste collection is contracted to a private company, WasteWise, that serves most of the Methow Valley; the non-profit organization Methow Recycles is contracted to provide curbside recycling pickup. Winthrop also has a commercial composting facility that opened in 2023 and collects materials from restaurants and residences.

=== Healthcare ===
The first medical clinic in Winthrop was the Country Clinic, opened in 2000 by a family physician. It was acquired by the Wenatchee-based Confluence Health system in 2015 and renamed to the Methow Valley Clinic. The town's nearest general hospitals are Mid-Valley Hospital in Omak and Three Rivers Hospital in Brewster. Three Rivers is operated by a public hospital district that encompasses most of western Okanogan County, including Winthrop.
