= Early Winters Ski Resort =

Never-built ski area in Washington, U.S.

Coordinates: 48°34′48″N 120°26′26″W

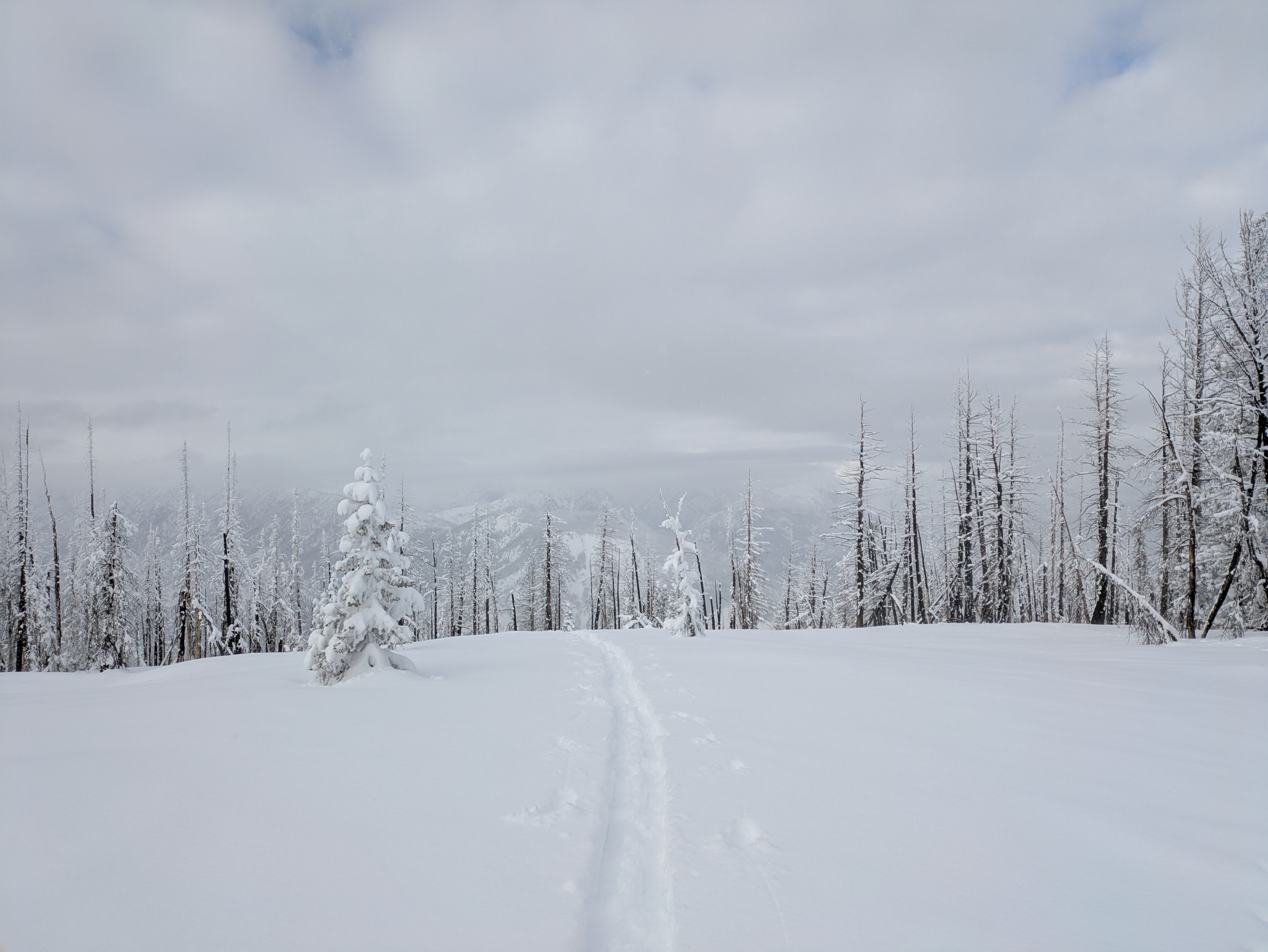
Ski touring near the top of Sandy Butte

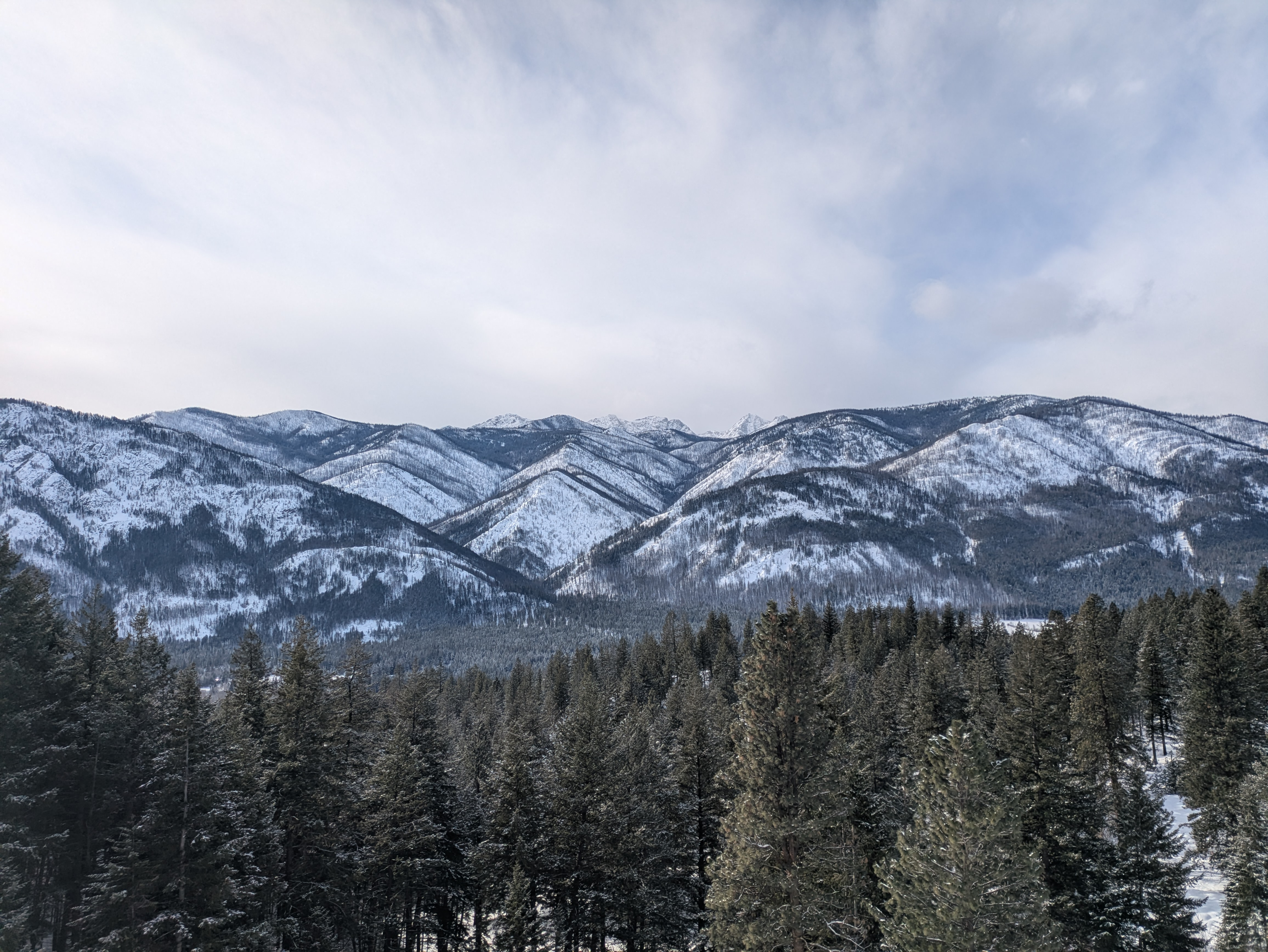
Looking at Sandy Butte (right) from across the valley

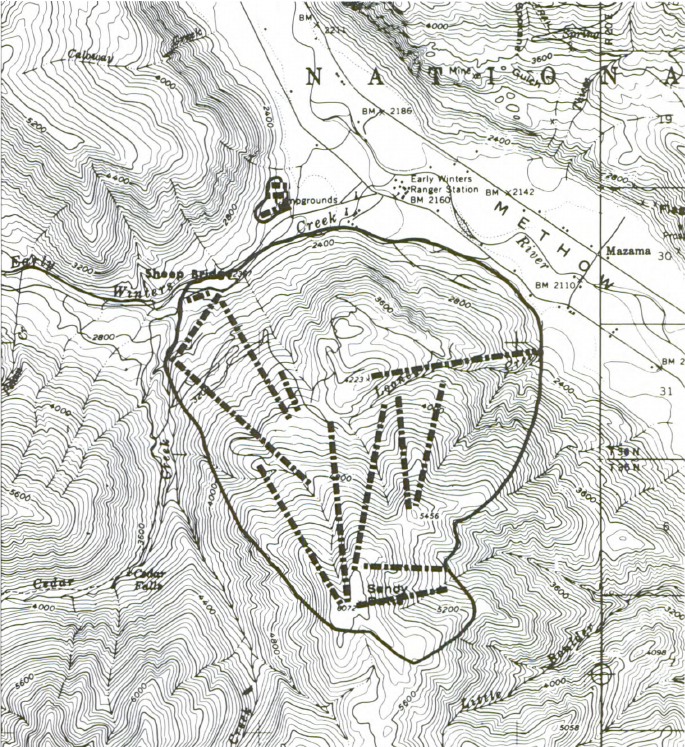
Map of the chairlifts proposed for the ski area

Early Winters Ski Resort was a proposed alpine-style destination ski resort that would have been built on Sandy Butte, west of the Methow Valley near Mazama, Washington, United States.

In the late 1960s, Methow rancher Doug Devin had the idea of building a ski resort on Sandy Butte, a nearby mountain 6,088 feet (1,856 m) in height, which could provide 4,000 feet (1,200 m) vertical of downhill skiing. Aspen Skiing Company got involved in the project in 1974, buying land nearby that it planned to include in the resort. The planned development divided valley residents, with some eager for job opportunities at the resort while others opposed what they considered a drastic change to the valley. Opponents founded the Methow Valley Citizens Council (MVCC) and launched lawsuits to oppose the development. Aspen left the project in 1977 due to lawsuits, but retained ownership of 1,165 acres (471 ha) that it had purchased nearby.

Undeterred, Devin founded Methow Recreation Inc. (MRI) to continue the fight. MRI applied for a special use permit to develop a ski resort on around 3,900 acres (1,600 ha) of Forest Service land at Sandy Butte, although the company also planned to use the nearby land owned by Aspen. The planned location was excluded from the wilderness areas protected by the Washington State Wilderness Act of 1984, and the Forest Service subsequently released an Environmental Impact Statement to evaluate the resort's potential environmental impact. In 1985, due to lawsuits, Aspen sold its stake in the project to The Hosey Group.

In 1987, Ski Magazine reported that "it looked as if Early Winters. Wash., would be a permanent entry in the lexicon of proposed ski resorts that were never built". Local opposition, the Carter administration's ban on new special use permits, and high interest rates had stymied the resort from being built. The lawsuits went all the way to the United States Supreme Court, which ruled unanimously in favor of the Forest Service's decision to grant the permit. However, lawsuits continued and the project was finally abandoned due to financial and logistical concerns in 1995.
