= Chewuch River =

- Location of the mouth of the Chewuch River in Washington Chewuch River (the United States)

Location
- Country: United States
- State: Washington
- Region: Okanogan County

Physical characteristics
- Source: Confluence of Remmell and Cathedral Creeks
  - coordinates: 48°56′45″N 120°9′39″W
  - elevation: 5,590 ft (1,700 m)
- Mouth: Methow River
  - location: Winthrop, Washington
  - coordinates: 48°28′35″N 120°11′0″W
  - elevation: 1,750 ft (530 m)
- Length: 45 mi (72 km)
- Basin size: 525 sq mi (1,360 km^{2})
- Discharge
  - average: 370 cu ft/s (10 m^{3}/s)
  - minimum: 20 cu ft/s (0.57 m^{3}/s)
  - maximum: 6,010 cu ft/s (170 m^{3}/s)

The Chewuch River is a river in the U.S. state of Washington.

Its name comes from the word /cwáx/ [čwáx] in the Columbia-Moses language meaning "creek".

The river valley was also the site of the Thirty Mile Fire which killed four fire fighters in July 2001.

== Course ==
The Chewuch River originates in the Cascade Range northeast of Remmel Mountain at the junction of Remmel Creek and Cathedral Creek. It flows generally south to join the Methow River at Winthrop. The Methow empties into the Columbia River. Tributaries of the Chewuch River include Andrews Creek, Lake Creek, Eightmile Creek, and Cub Creek.

Just below the mouth of Meadow Creek, the river cascades about 30 feet (9 m) over Chewuch Falls.

== See also ==
- List of rivers of Washington (state)
- List of tributaries of the Columbia River
