= Amphitheater Mountain (Washington) =

Mountain in Washington (state), United States

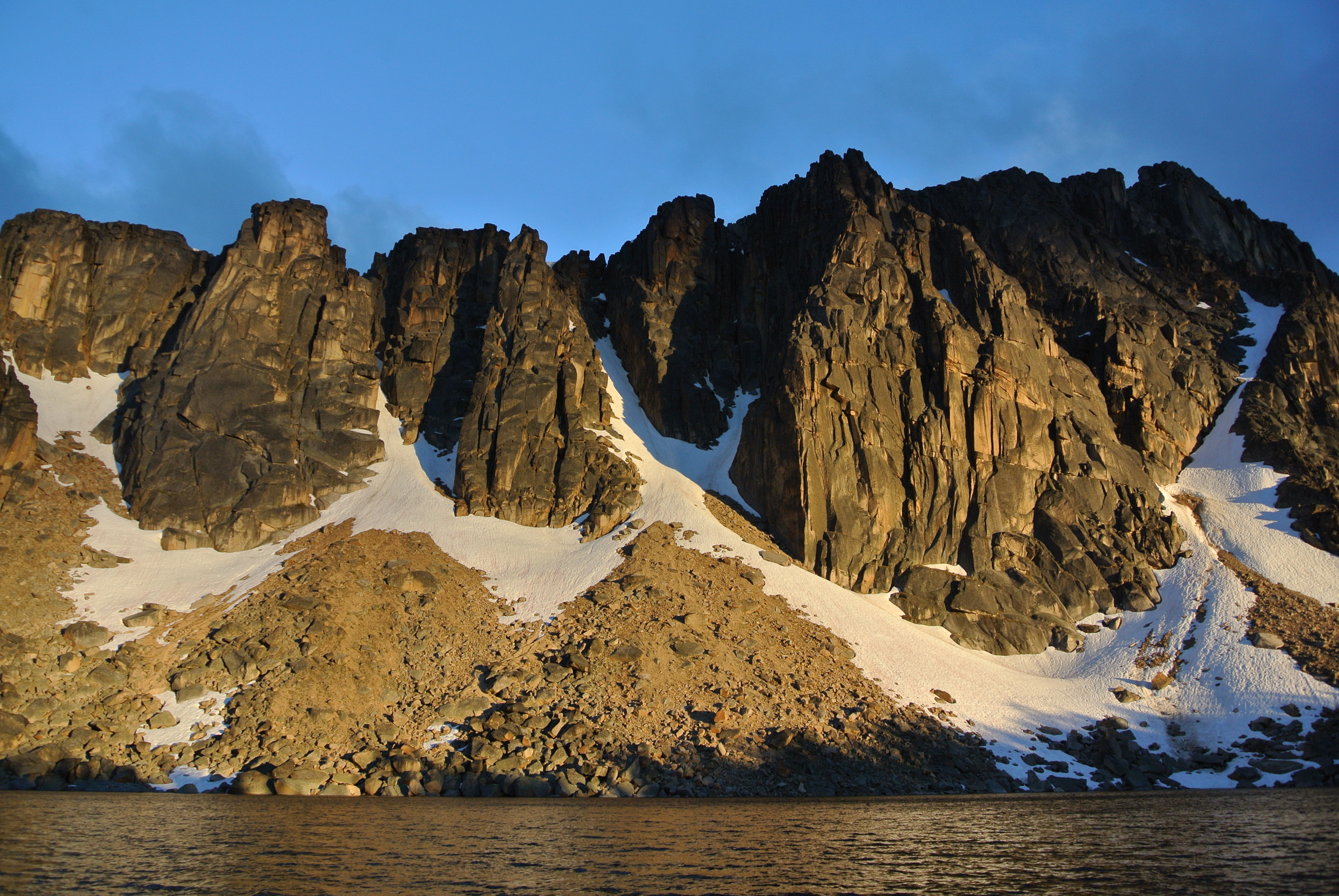
- Amphitheater Mountain from Upper Cathedral Lake at sunset.

Highest point
- Elevation: 8,358 ft (2,548 m)
- Prominence: 758 ft (231 m)
- Parent peak: Cathedral Peak (8,606 ft)
- Isolation: 0.95 mi (1.53 km)
- Coordinates: 48°58′32″N 120°11′32″W

Geography
- Location within Washington (state) Location within the United States
- Interactive map of Amphitheater Mountain
- Country: United States
- State: Washington
- County: Okanogan
- Protected area: Pasayten Wilderness
- Parent range: Okanogan Range; North Cascades; Cascade Range
- Topo map: USGS Remmel Mountain

Geology
- Rock type: Granite

Climbing
- First ascent: 1901 by Calkins, Smith
- Easiest route: Scrambling class 3

Amphitheater Mountain is an 8,358-foot (2,548-metre) multi-peak mountain located in Okanogan County in Washington state. It is part of the Okanogan Range which is a sub-range of the North Cascades and Cascade Range. The mountain is situated on the east side of the Cascade crest, in the Pasayten Wilderness, on land administered by the Okanogan–Wenatchee National Forest. The sprawling Amphitheater Mountain has several sub-peaks including the South Peak (8,269 ft; 2,520 m), West Peak (8,252 ft; 2,515 m), and North Peak (8,200 ft; 2,500 m). The nearest higher peak is Cathedral Peak, 0.95 miles (1.53 km) to the north. The Pacific Northwest Trail traverses below the north slope of Amphitheater Mountain as it crosses Cathedral Pass. Precipitation runoff from Amphitheater Mountain drains west into Cathedral Fork, or east into Cathedral Creek.

== Climate ==
Weather fronts originating in the Pacific Ocean travel northeast toward the Cascade Mountains. As fronts approach the North Cascades, they are forced upward by the peaks of the Cascade Range (orographic lift), causing them to drop their moisture in the form of rain or snowfall onto the Cascades. As a result, the west side of the North Cascades experiences higher precipitation than the east side, especially during the winter months in the form of snowfall. During winter months, weather is usually cloudy, but due to high pressure systems over the Pacific Ocean that intensify during summer months, there is often little or no cloud cover during the summer.

== Geology ==
The North Cascades features some of the most rugged topography in the Cascade Range with craggy peaks, spires, ridges, and deep glacial valleys. Geological events occurring many years ago created the diverse topography and drastic elevation changes over the Cascade Range leading to the various climate differences.

The history of the formation of the Cascade Mountains dates back millions of years ago to the late Eocene Epoch. With the North American Plate overriding the Pacific Plate, episodes of volcanic igneous activity persisted. In addition, small fragments of the oceanic and continental lithosphere called terranes created the North Cascades about 50 million years ago.

During the Pleistocene period dating back over two million years ago, glaciation advancing and retreating repeatedly scoured the landscape leaving deposits of rock debris. The U-shaped cross section of the river valleys is a result of recent glaciation. Uplift and faulting in combination with glaciation have been the dominant processes which have created the tall peaks and deep valleys of the North Cascades area.

== Climbing Routes ==
Established rock climbing routes on Amphitheater Mountain:

- Pilgrimage to Mecca - class 5.9 - 4 pitches
- Finger of Fatwa - class 5.11c - 5 pitches
- North Ridge - class 5.5 - 5 pitches
- Middle Finger Buttress, Left Side - class 5.10b - 4 pitches
- Middle Finger Buttress, Right Side - class 5.9 - 7 pitches

== Gallery ==
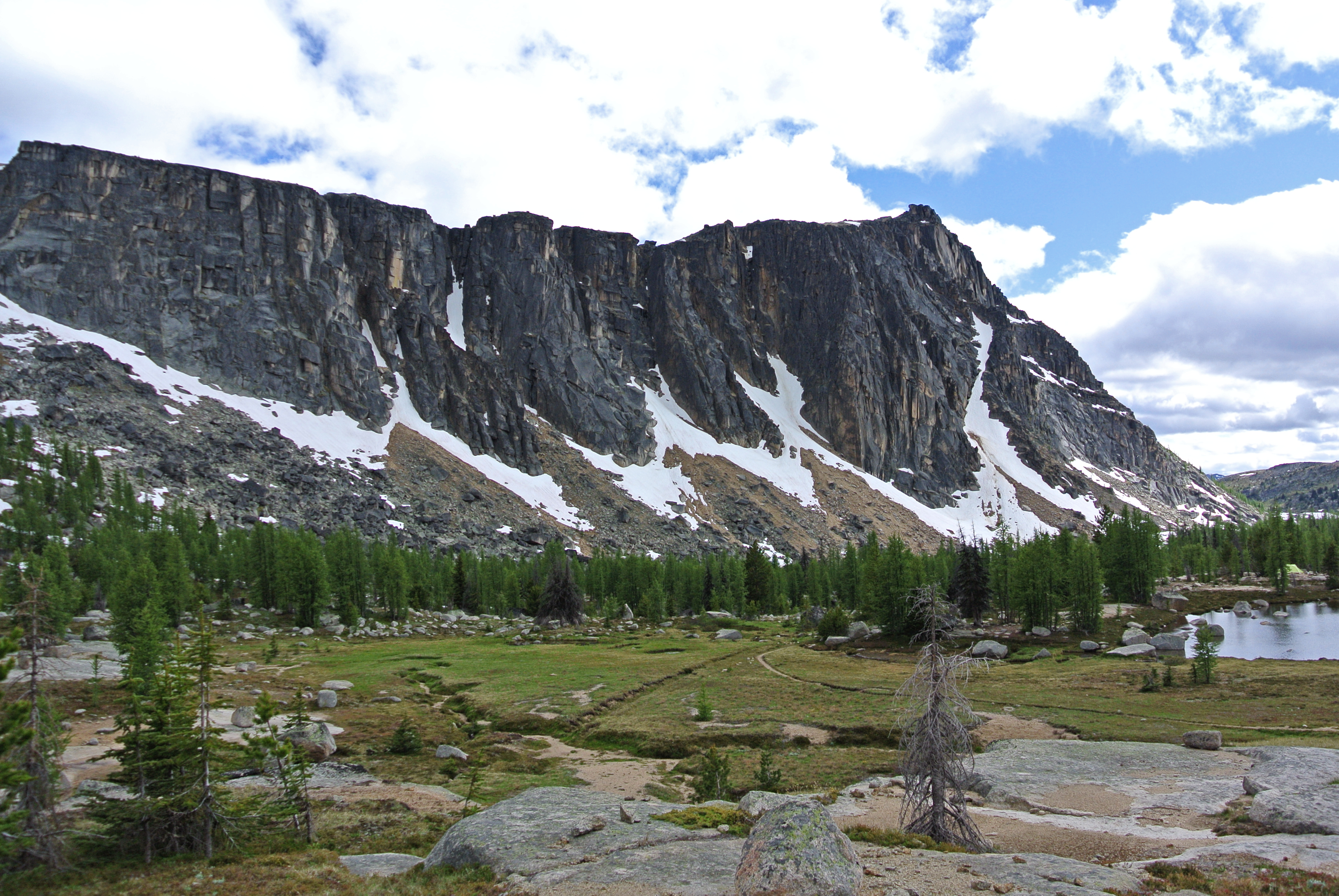
Amphitheater Mountain from Cathedral Pass

== See also ==
- Geography of the North Cascades
- Geology of the Pacific Northwest
