= List of census-designated places in Oregon =

Map of the United States with Oregon highlighted

Oregon is a state located in the Western United States that is divided into 36 counties and contains 135 census designated-places (CDPs). All population data is based on the 2020 census.

== Census-designated places ==
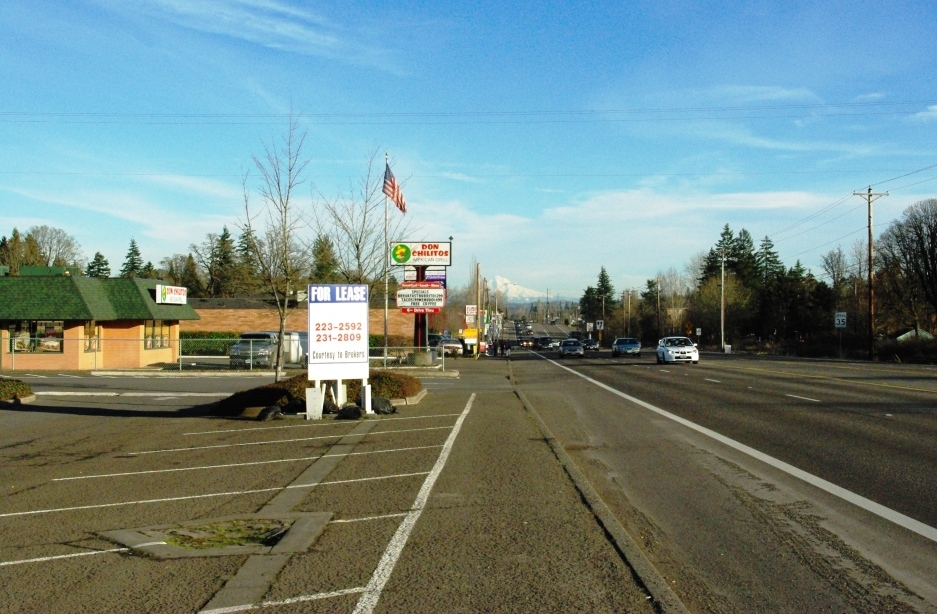
Aloha

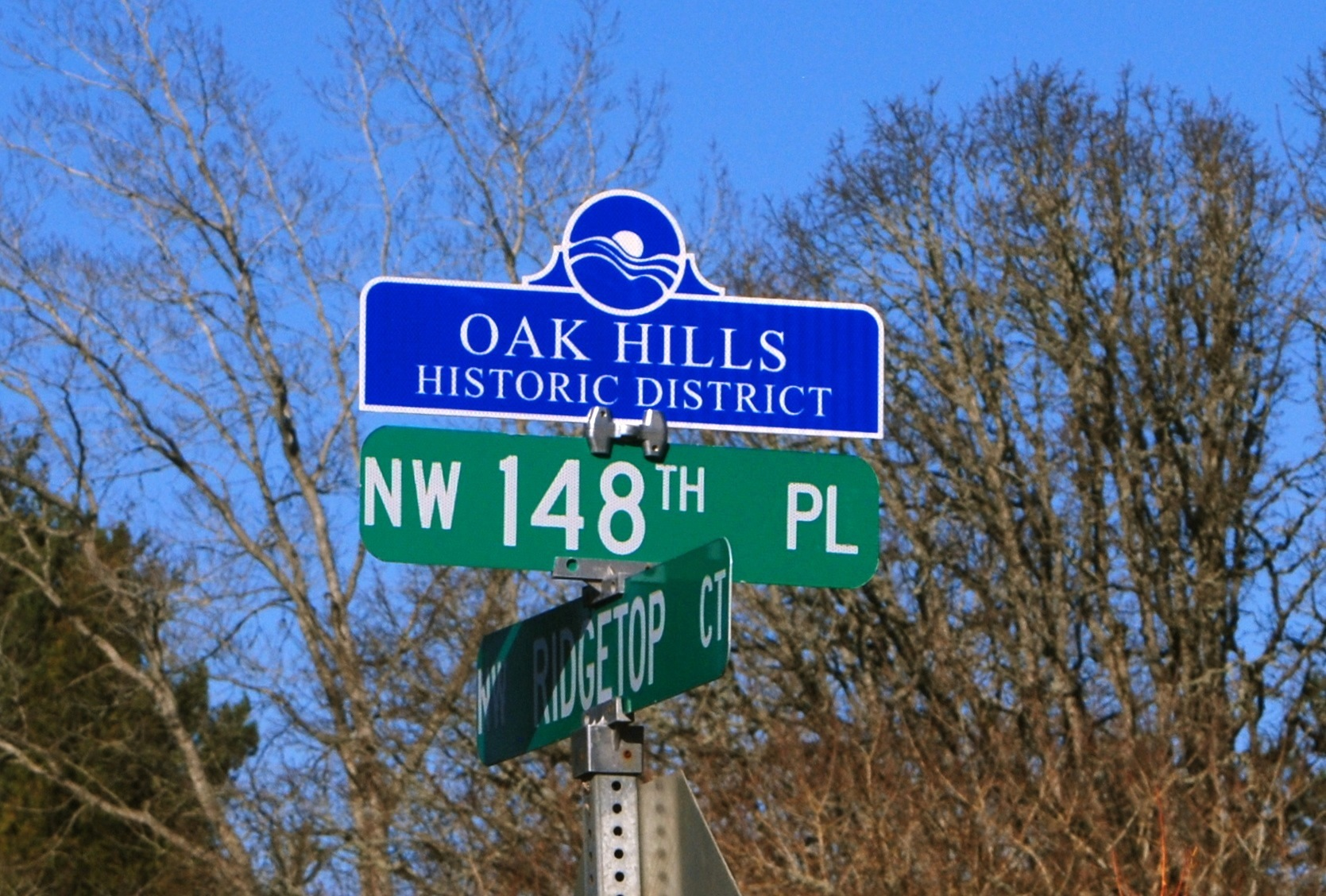
Oak Hills

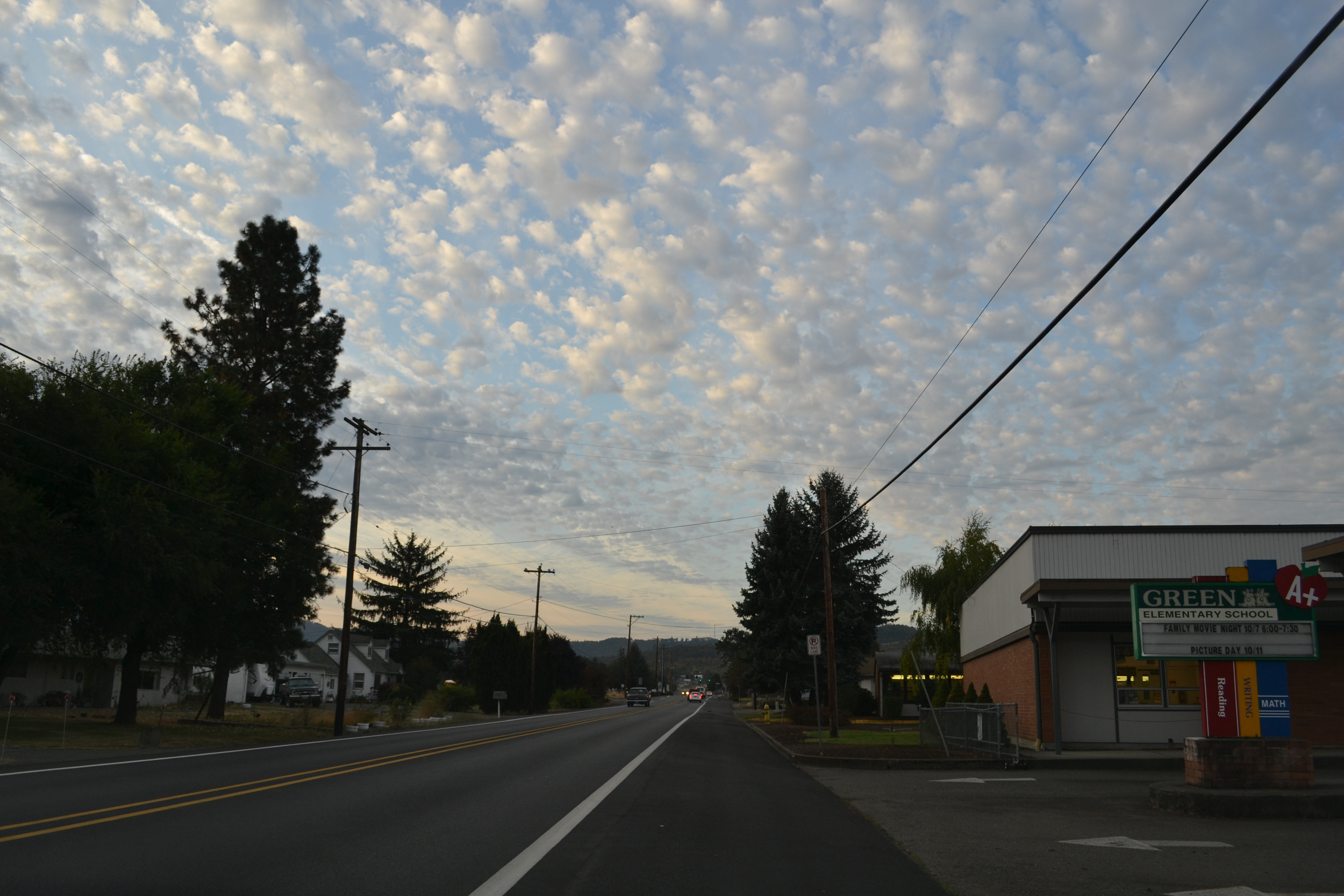
Green

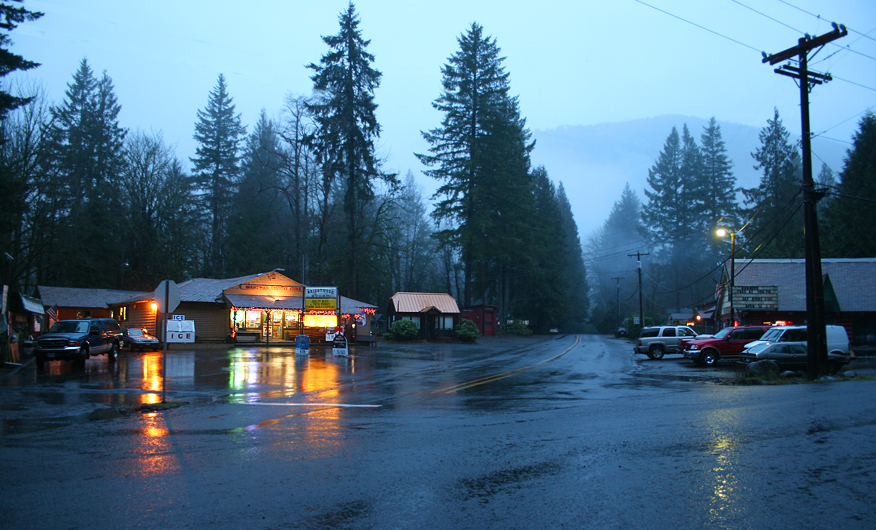
Brightwood is one of the communities in Mount Hood Village

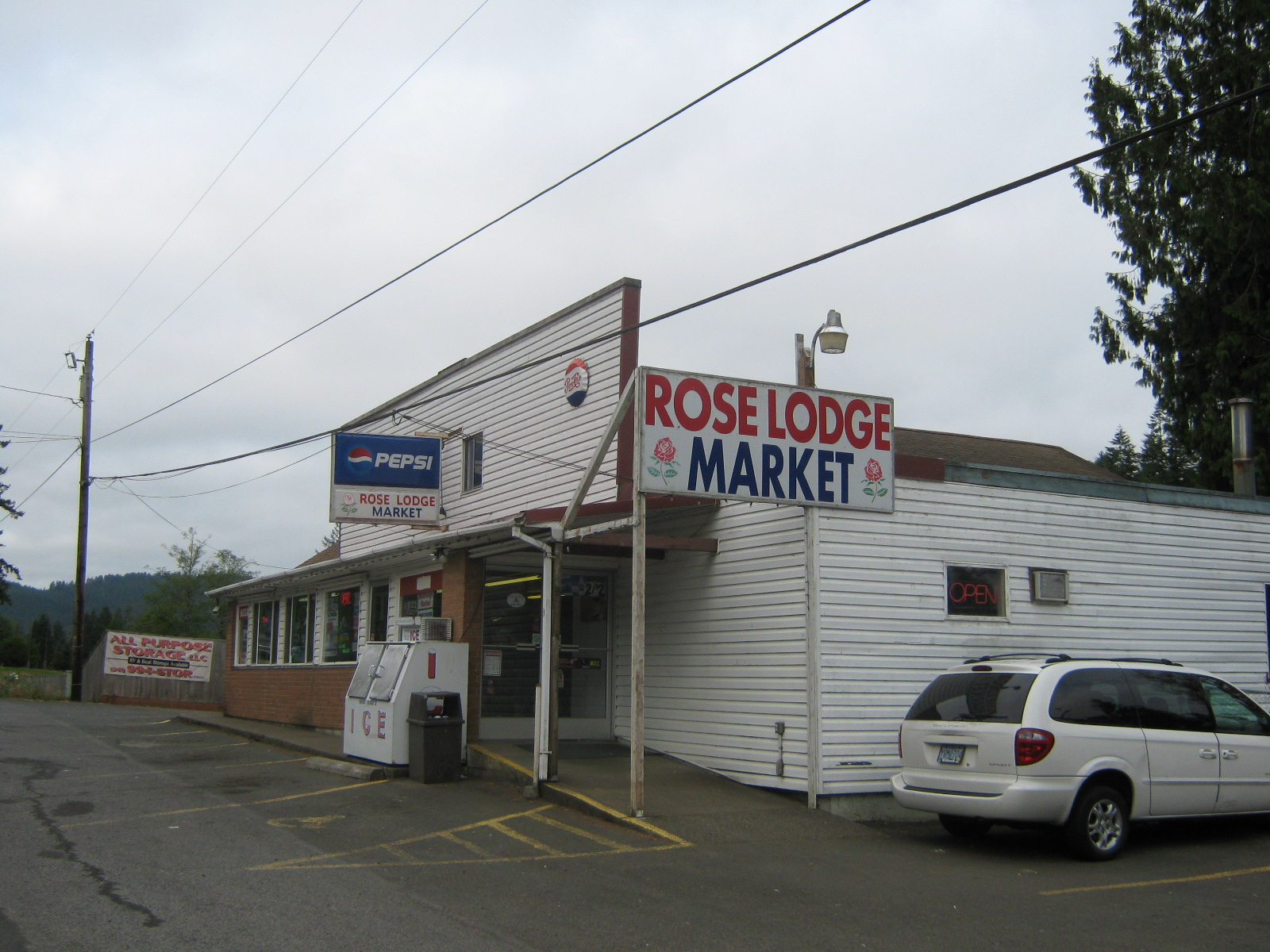
Market in Rose Lodge

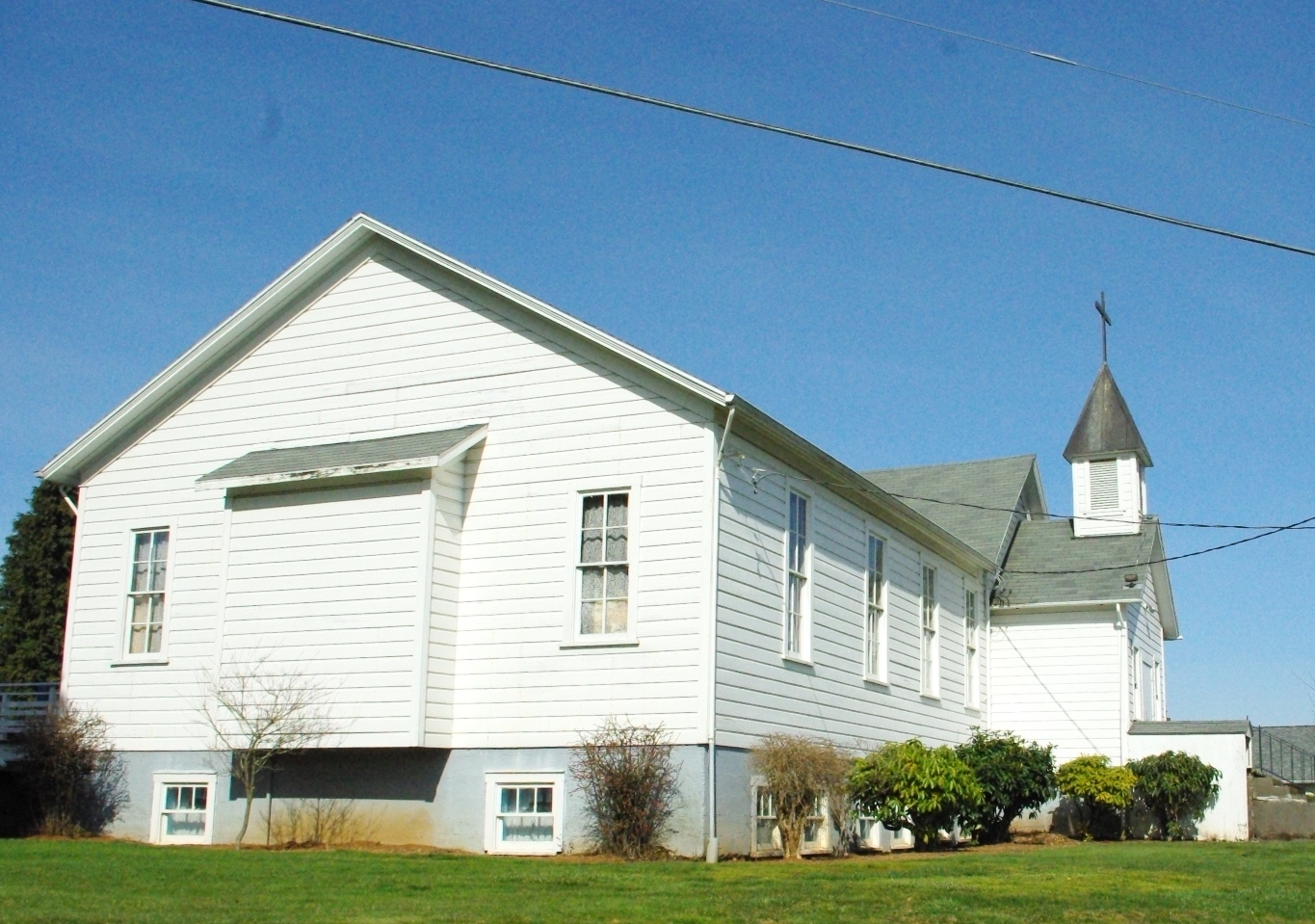
Baptist church in Stafford

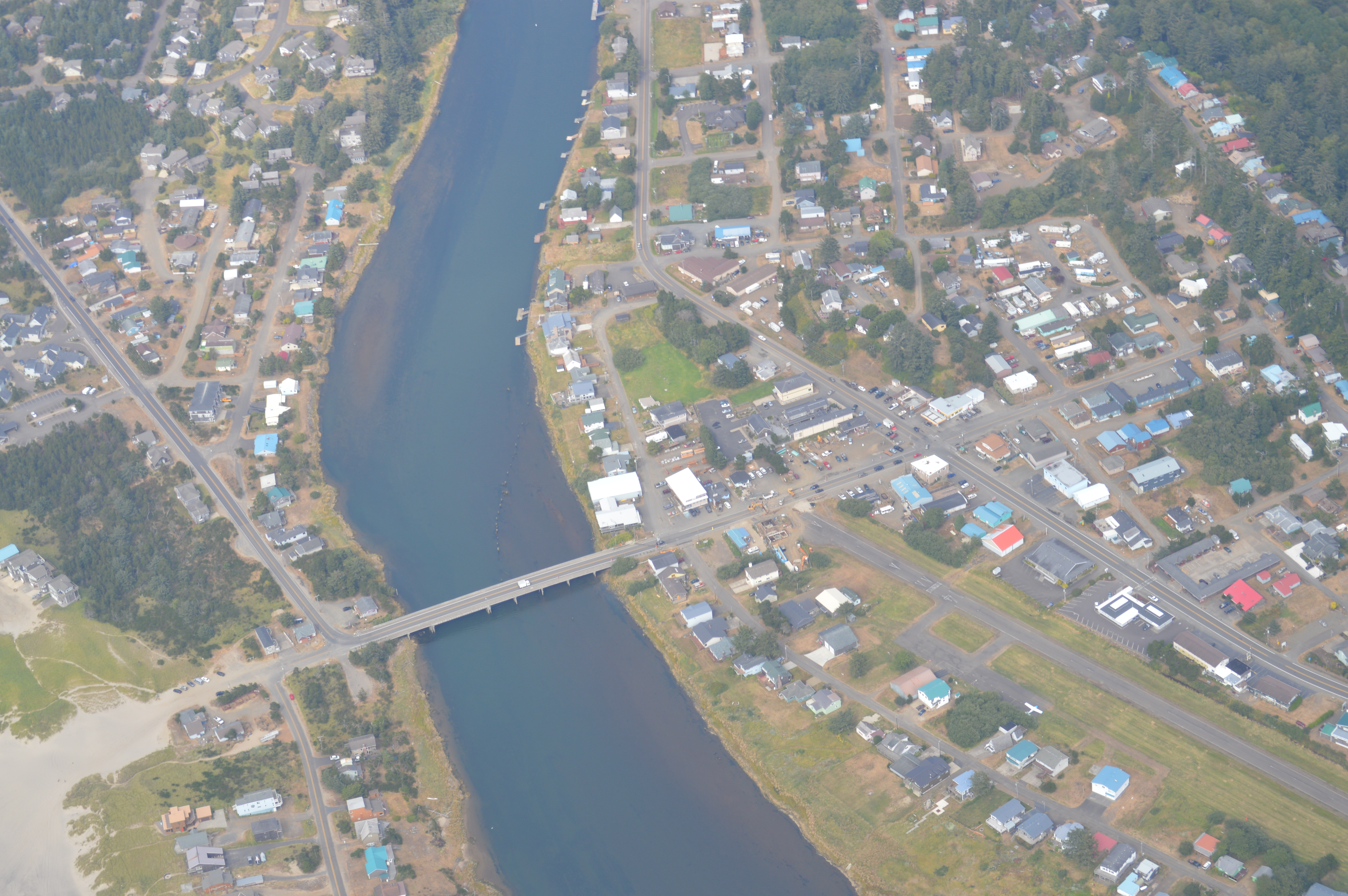
Pacific City

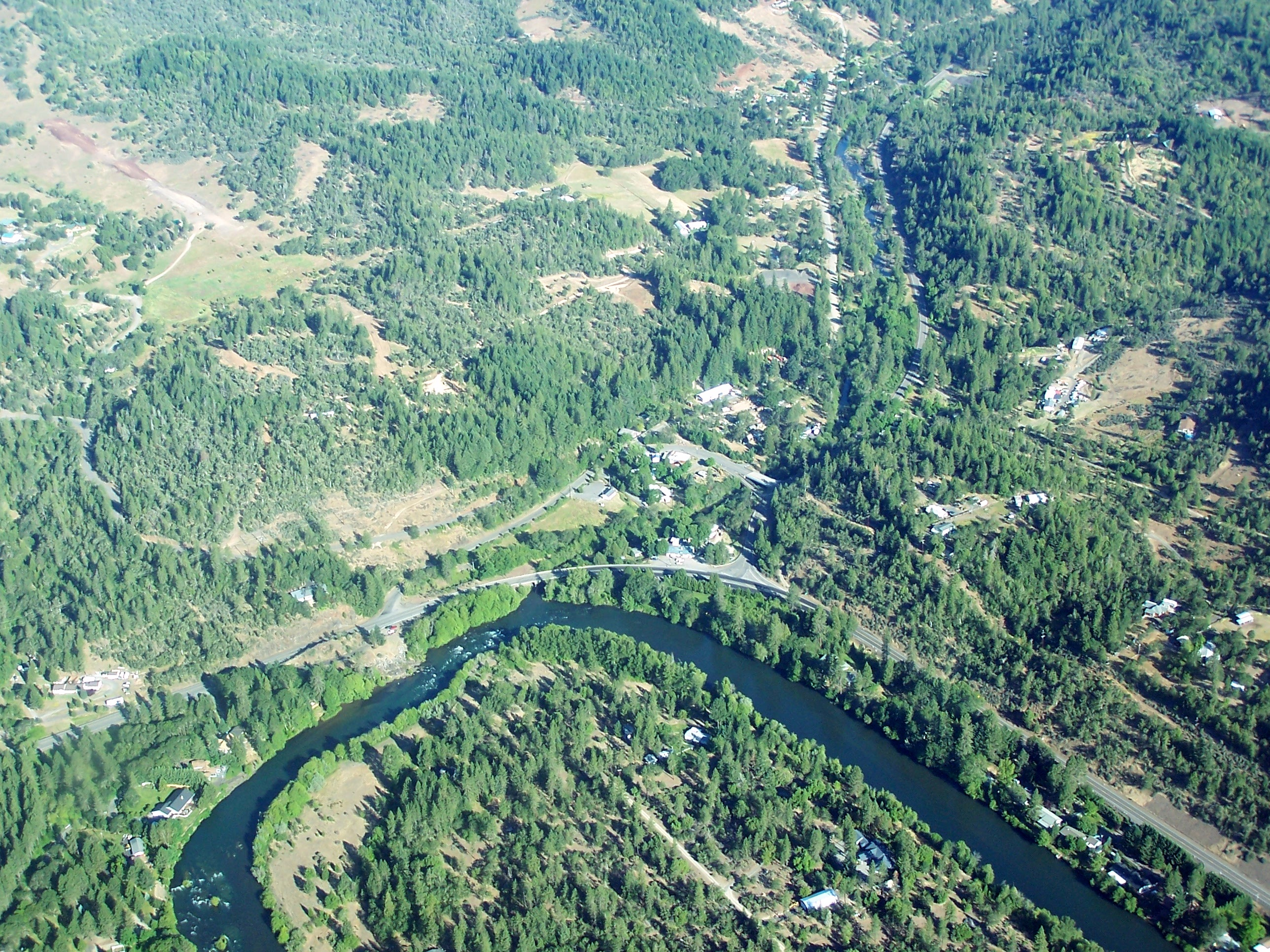
Trail

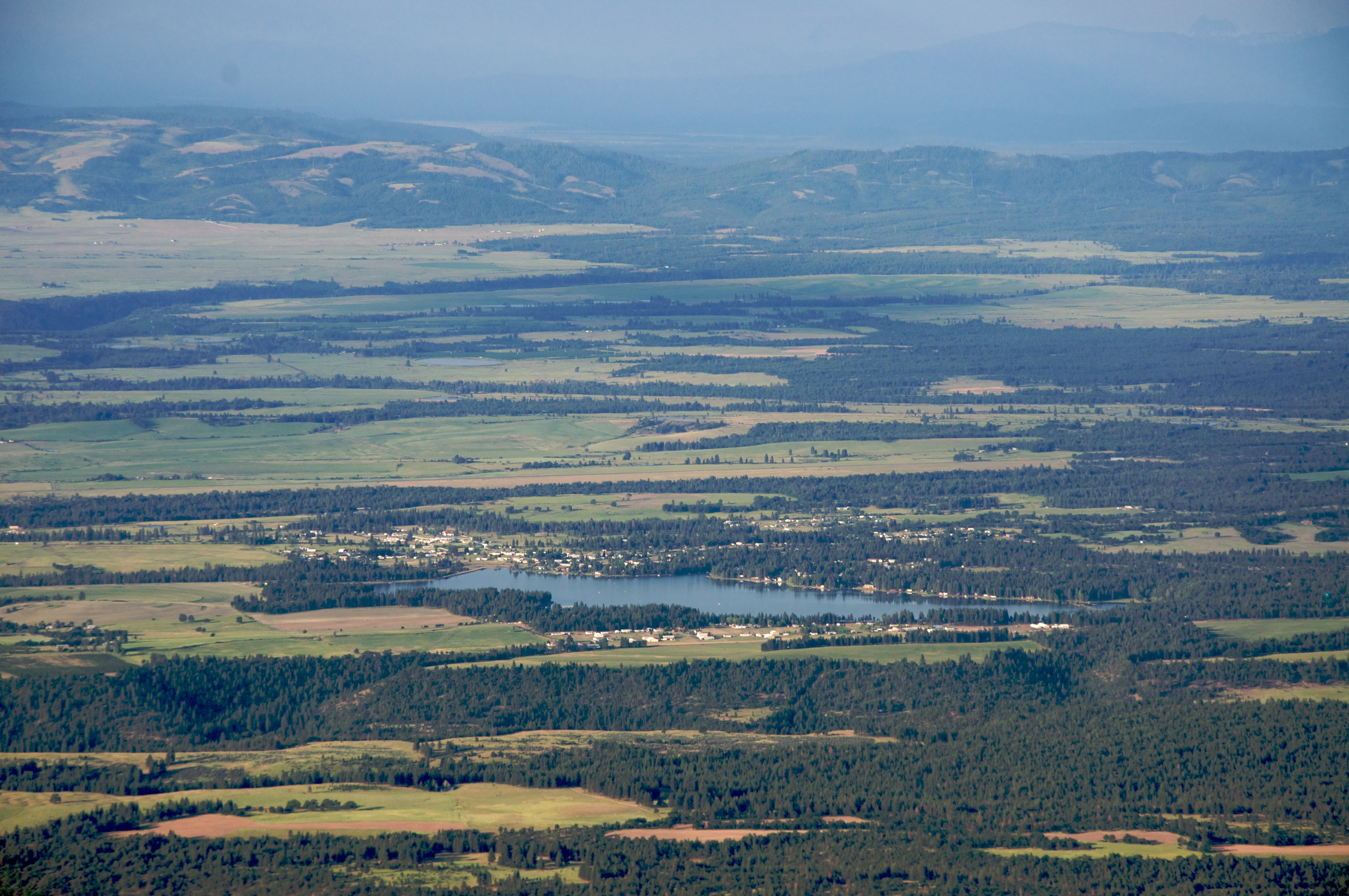
Pine Hollow

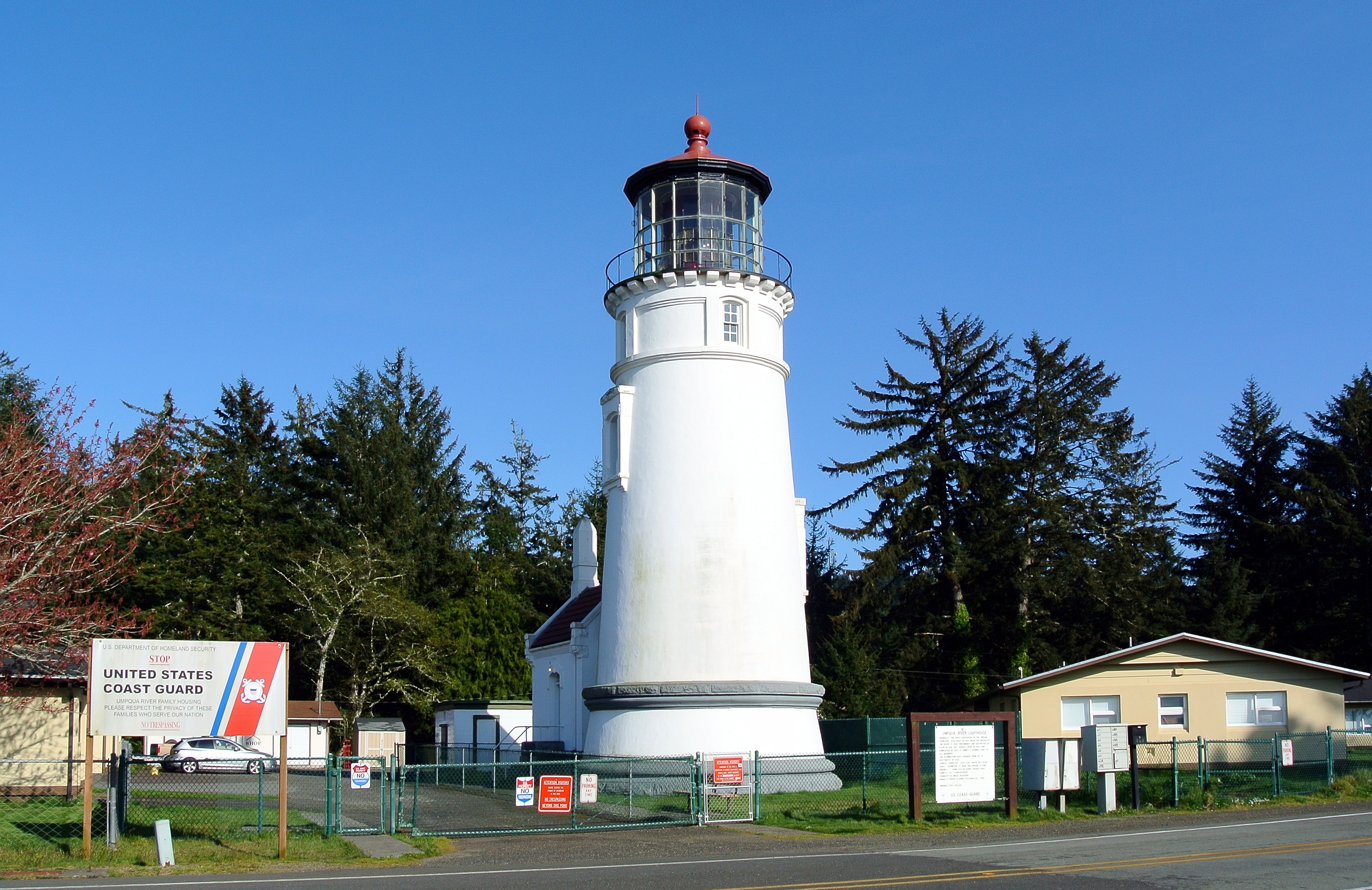
Umpqua River Light in Winchester Bay

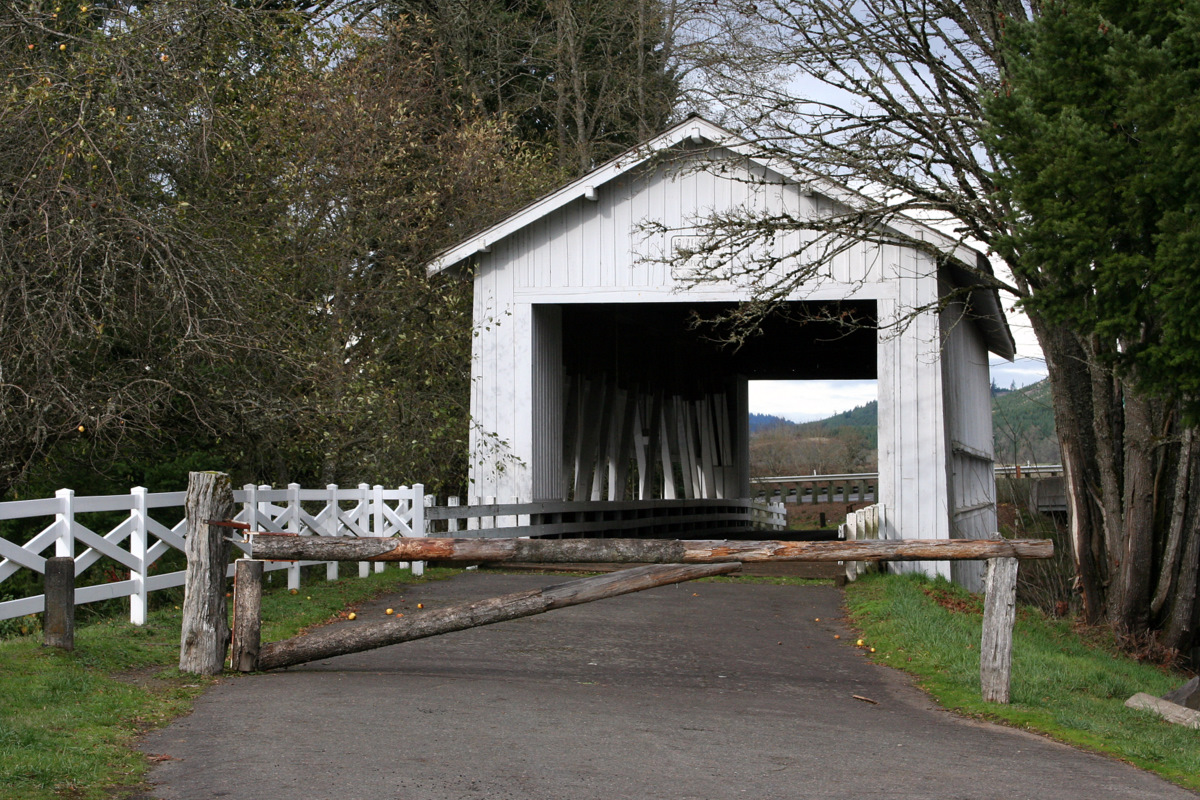
Crawfordsville Bridge in Crawfordsville

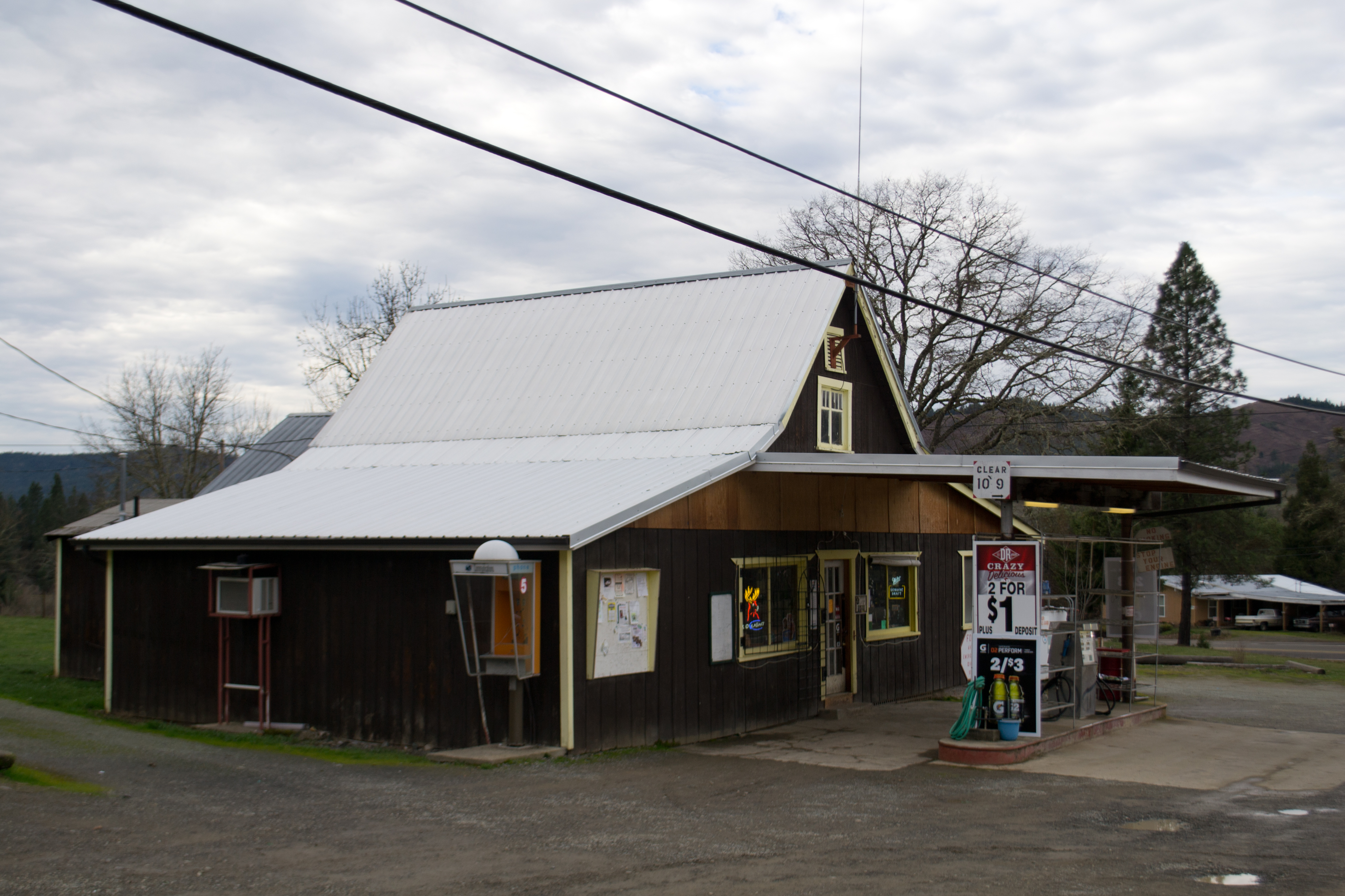
General store in Days Creek

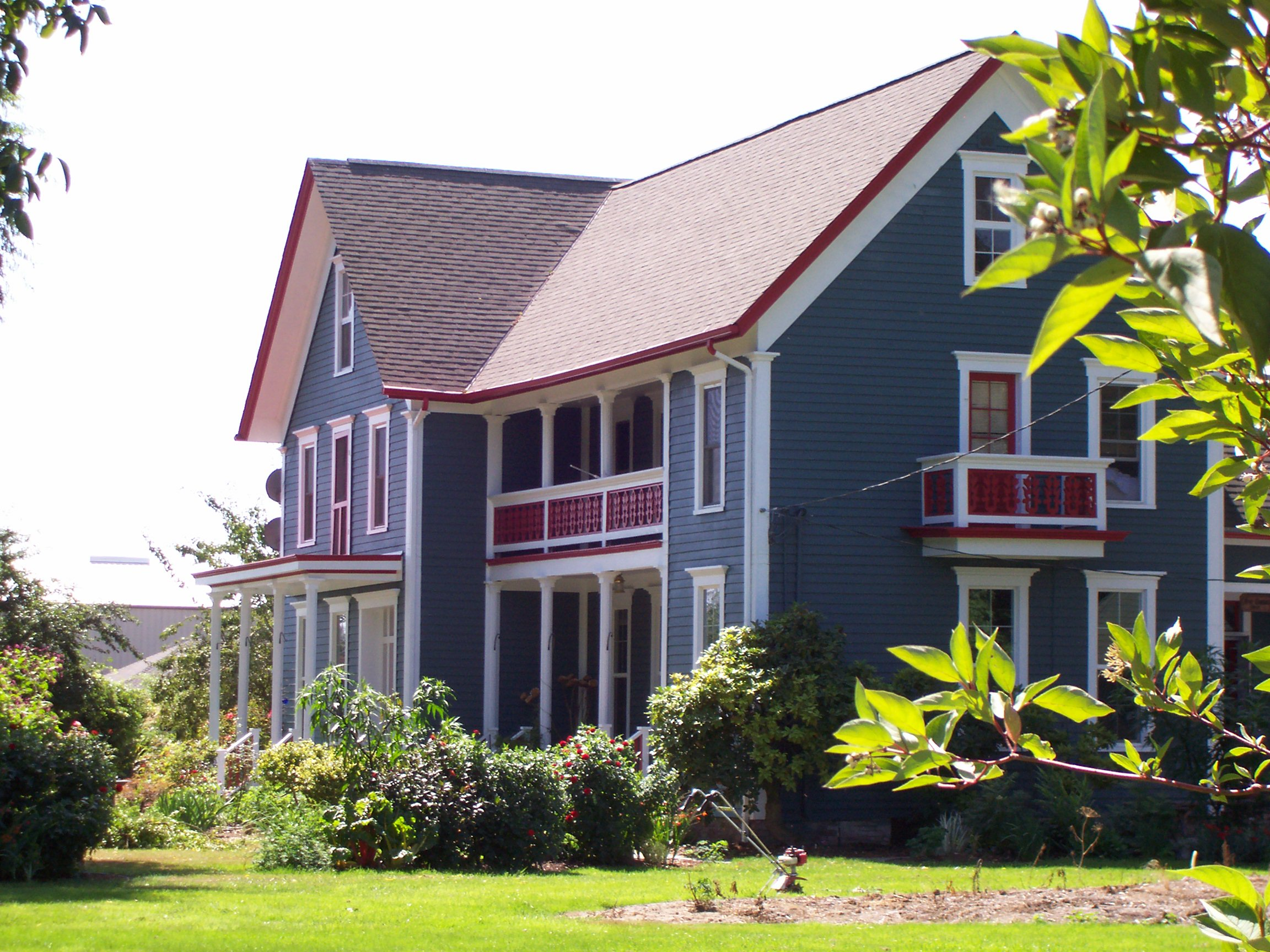
Porter-Brasfield House in Shedd

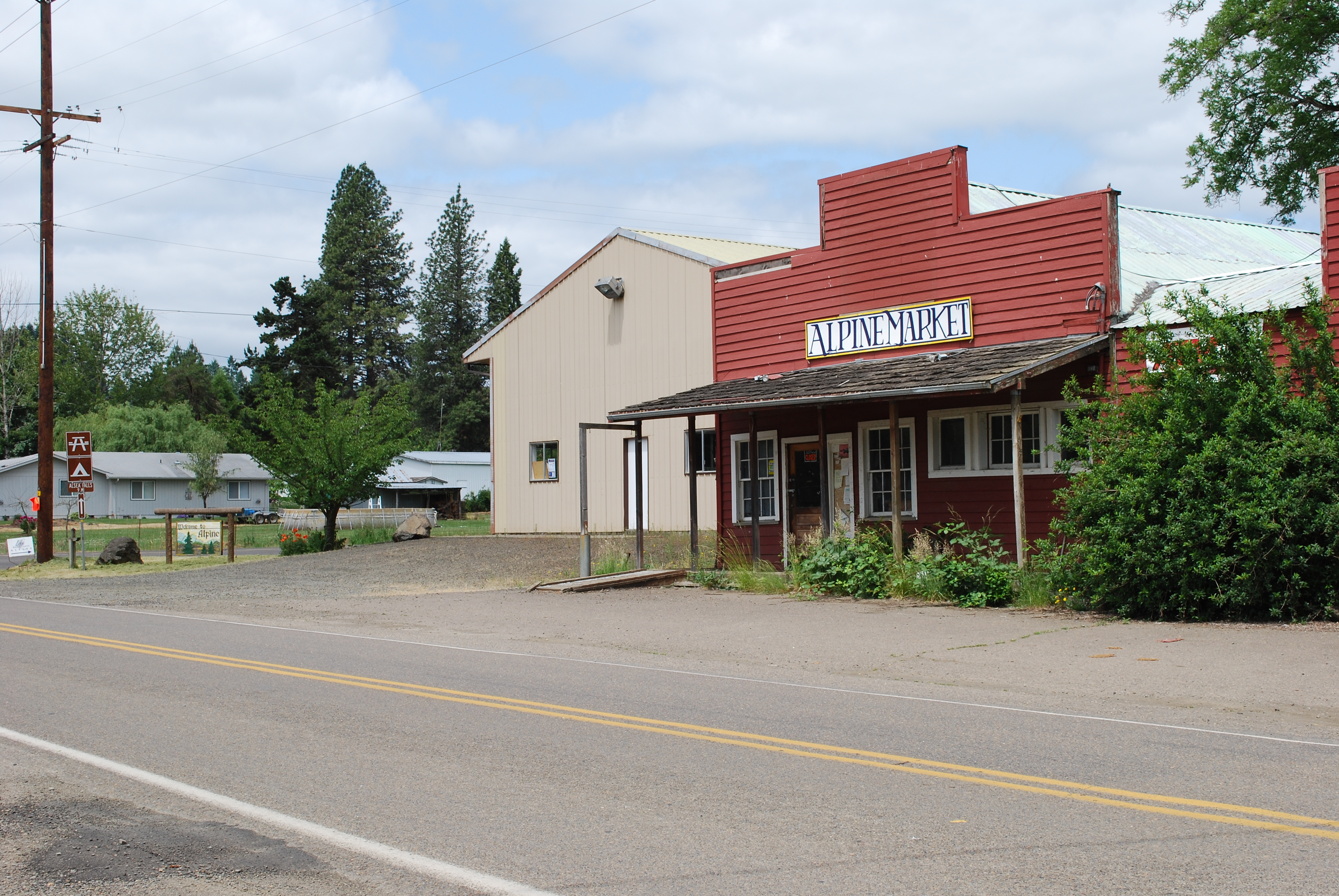
Market in Alpine

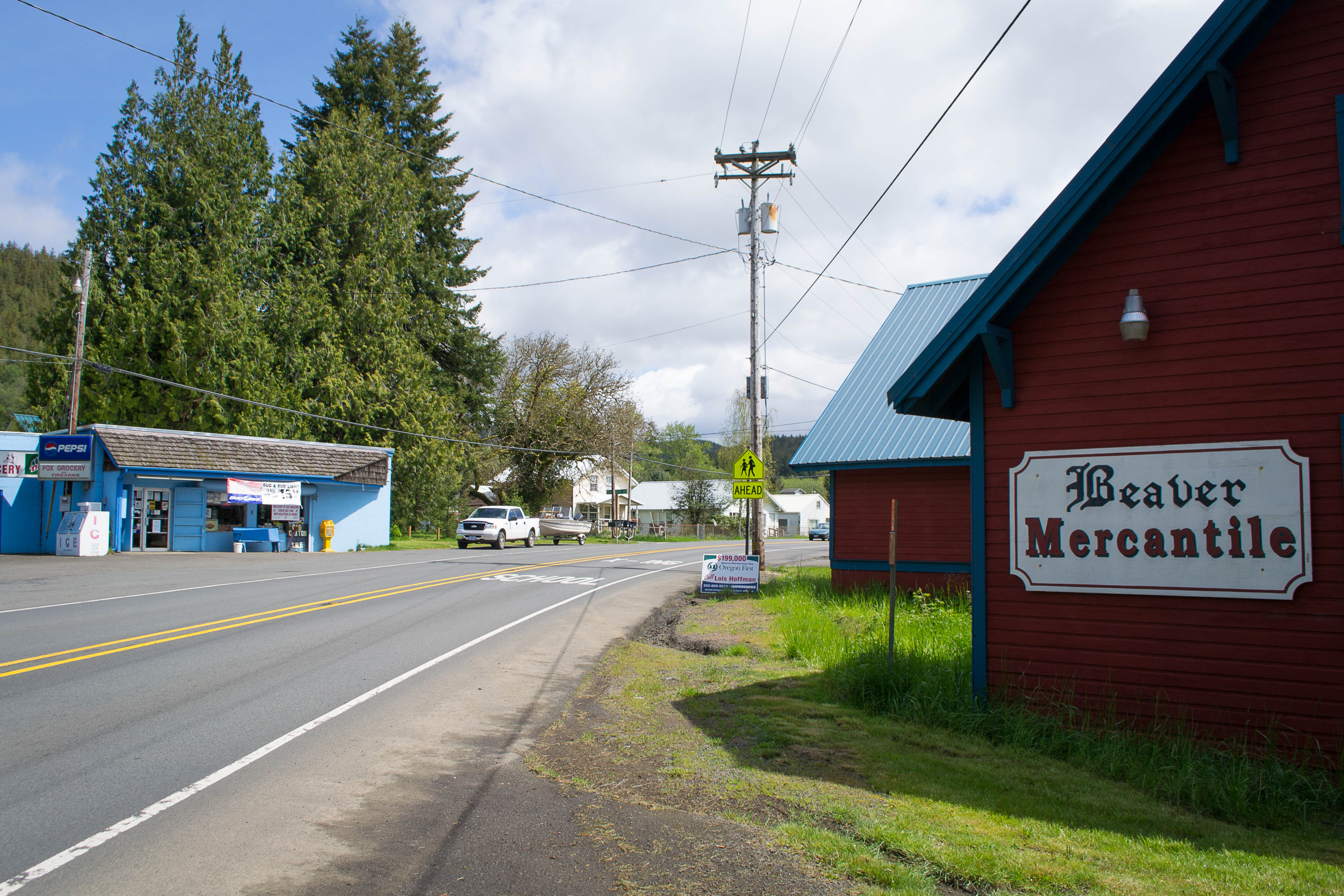
Beaver

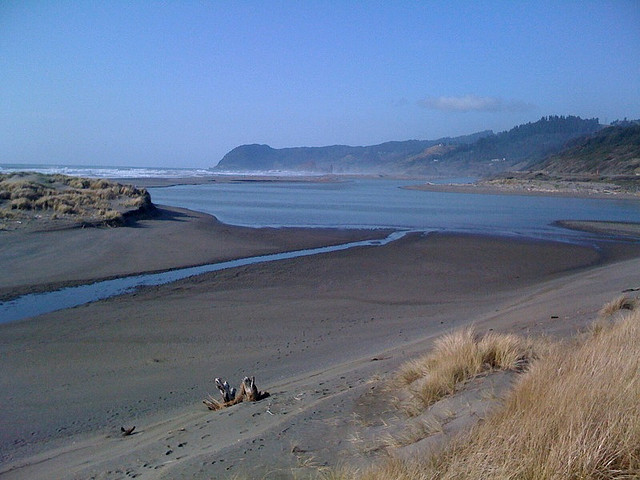
Pistol River

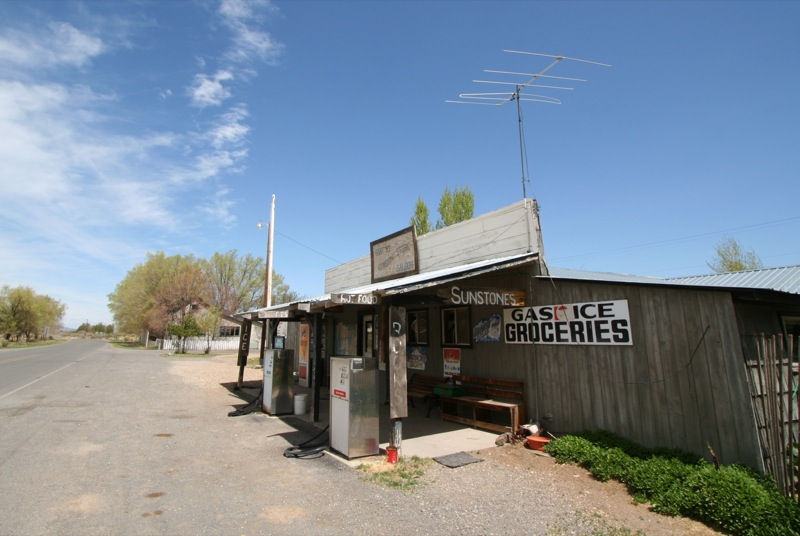
Plush

Name	County	Population		Land area	
Name	County	2020 Census	2010 Census	sq mi	km^{2}
Aloha	Washington	53,828	49,425	7.37	19.1
Altamont	Klamath	20,223	19,257	8.10	21.0
Bethany	Washington	31,350	20,646	5.14	13.3
Cedar Mill	Multnomah and Washington	17,259	14,546	3.32	8.6
Hayesville	Marion	21,891	19,936	3.07	8.0
Four Corners	Marion	16,740	15,947	2.70	7.0
Oak Grove	Clackamas	17,290	16,629	3.89	10.1
Oak Hills	Washington	11,903	11,333	1.56	4.0
Oatfield	Clackamas	13,977	13,415	3.40	8.8
Santa Clara	Lane	11,239			
Damascus	Clackamas	11,050	10,539	657	1,700
Rockcreek	Washington	9,862	9,316	1.96	5.1
Bull Mountain	Washington	9,992	9,133	2.91	7.5
River Road	Lane	8,732		1.82	4.7
Cedar Hills	Washington	8,379	8,300	1.91	4.9
West Haven-Sylvan	Multnomah and Washington	9,299	8,001	2.33	6.0
White City	Jackson	9,090	7,975	1.87	4.8
Green	Douglas	7,614	7,515	4.53	11.7
Jennings Lodge	Clackamas	7,503	7,315	1.60	4.1
Garden Home–Whitford	Washington	7,081	6,674	1.52	3.9
West Slope	Washington	7,223	6,554	1.62	4.2
Roseburg North	Douglas	4,375	5,912	22.33	57.8
Raleigh Hills	Washington	6,196	5,896	1.53	4.0
Marlene Village	Washington	5,485			
Deschutes River Woods	Deschutes	5,532	5,077	5.96	15.4
Crooked River Ranch	Deschutes and Jefferson	4,912		12,000	49
Mount Hood Village	Clackamas	4,864	4,864	26.14	67.7
Beavercreek	Clackamas	4,727	4,485	20.12	52.1
Tri-City	Douglas	4,019	3,931	7.22	18.7
Metzger	Washington	4,272	3,765	0.74	1.9
Three Rivers	Deschutes	3,925	3,014	7.53	19.5
Warm Springs	Jefferson	2,435	2,945	42.52	110.1
Redwood	Josephine	2,702	2,627	3.47	9.0
Juniper Canyon	Crook	2,564		96.33	249.5
Harbor	Curry	2,551	2,391	1.92	5.0
Odell	Hood River	2,328	2,255	2.02	5.2
Mulino	Clackamas	2,250	2,103	13.78	35.7
Lincoln Beach	Lincoln	2,343	2,045	3.23	8.4
Keno	Klamath	1,980		9.57	24.8
Boring	Clackamas	1,931		30.0	78
Heceta	Lane	1,912		2.83	7.3
Rose Lodge	Lincoln	1,933	1,894	9.54	24.7
Chenoweth	Wasco	1,975	1,855	5.61	14.5
Barview	Coos	1,890	1,844	1.38	3.6
Glide	Douglas	1,805	1,795	10.08	26.1
Warren	Columbia	1,870	1,787	6.30	16.3
Dunthorpe	Multnomah	1,704		1,619.77	4,195.2
Eagle Crest	Deschutes	2,761	1,696	15.19	39.3
Grand Ronde	Polk and Yamhill	2,010	1,661	0.70	1.8
Merlin	Josephine	1,690	1,615	19.20	49.7
Stafford	Clackamas	1,895	1,577	6.02	15.6
Prineville Lake Acres	Crook	1,556		6.59	17.1
New Hope	Josephine	1,572	1,515	3.83	9.9
Bunker Hill	Coos	1,465	1,444	1.46	3.8
Sunriver	Deschutes	2,023	1,393	8.83	22.9
Terrebonne	Deschutes	1,393	1,257	1.01	2.6
Williams	Josephine	1,102	1,072	11.32	29.3
Saunders Lake	Coos	1,055		2.95	7.6
Mission	Umatilla	960	1,037	7.61	19.7
Pacific City	Tillamook	1,109	1,035	3.72	9.6
Knappa	Clatsop	1,007		2.11	5.5
South Lebanon	Linn	1,228	1,005	1.04	2.7
Bayside Gardens	Tillamook	1,214	880	0.99	2.6
Bayshore	Lincoln	952		2.47	6.4
Dexter	Lane	893		485.33	1,257.0
Running Y Ranch	Klamath	858		5.36	13.9
Lookingglass	Douglas	916	855	11.58	30.0
Svensen	Clatsop	853		2.26	5.9
Ruch	Jackson	819	840	6.73	17.4
Foots Creek	Jackson	734	799	6.07	15.7
Jasper	Lane	793		2.72	7.0
Glasgow	Coos	785	763	3.22	8.3
Netarts	Tillamook	894	748	2.60	6.7
Melrose	Douglas	834	735	4.35	11.3
Trail	Jackson	768	702	6.80	17.6
Selma	Josephine	661	695	6.46	16.7
Falcon Heights	Klamath	680		1,626.79	4,213.4
Wimer	Jackson	690	678	4.96	12.8
Green Meadows	Umatilla	675		1.23	3.2
Pleasant Valley	Tillamook	620			
Neotsu	Lincoln	608		1.41	3.7
Kerby	Josephine	628	595	2.58	6.7
Marcola	Lane	580		1.22	3.2
San Marine	Lincoln	553		1.99	5.2
Elmira	Lane	546		1.35	3.5
Lacomb	Linn	575	546	3.98	10.3
O'Brien	Josephine	470	504	5.21	13.5
Cherry Grove	Washington	503		464.88	1,204.0
Fairview	Tillamook	498			
Pine Hollow	Wasco	531	494	2.22	5.7
Mapleton	Lane	493		0.96	2.5
Tumalo	Deschutes	558	488	1.71	4.4
Tutuilla	Umatilla	448	487	20.05	51.9
Dillard	Douglas	385	478	1.18	3.1
Nesika Beach	Curry	432	463	2.28	5.9
Orient	Multnomah	462		0.95	2.5
Prospect	Jackson	449	455	3.50	9.1
Ochoco West	Crook	432		0.44	1.1
Wedderburn	Curry	426		1.26	3.3
Crescent	Klamath	412		1.17	3.0
Labish Village	Marion	454	412	0.05	0.13
Brooks	Marion	472	398	0.52	1.3
River Point	Clatsop	397		0.60	1.6
Crabtree	Linn	406	391	1.81	4.7
Winchester Bay	Douglas	462	382	2.31	6.0
Gopher Flats	Umatilla	329	379	2.11	5.5
Holley	Linn	390	378	2.82	7.3
Takilma	Josephine	423	378	5.94	15.4
Jeffers Gardens	Clatsop	424	368	0.57	1.5
Black Butte Ranch	Deschutes	260	366	8.20	21.2
Oceanside	Tillamook	366	361	1.04	2.7
Trent	Lane	339		1.61	4.2
Idaville	Tillamook	374	337	0.49	1.3
Crawfordsville	Linn	315	332	1.92	5.0
Oregon Shores	Klamath	330		1.31	3.4
Cheshire	Lane	329		0.47	1.2
Westport	Clatsop	319	321	0.66	1.7
Umapine	Umatilla	285	315	3.32	8.6
Marion	Marion	307	313	1.15	3.0
Parkdale	Hood River	299	311	0.63	1.6
Rocky Point	Klamath	310			
Dilley	Washington	301		0.75	1.9
Deer Island	Columbia	323	294	0.49	1.3
Mehama	Marion	317	292	0.46	1.2
Mount Hood	Hood River	310	286	1.92	5.0
Fair Oaks	Douglas	238	278	1.84	4.8
Days Creek	Douglas	271	272	2.36	6.1
Butteville	Marion	273	265	1.05	2.7
Rhododendron	Clackamas	262			
Cloverdale	Tillamook	267	250	0.80	2.1
Gardiner	Douglas	259	248	0.58	1.5
Annex	Malheur	225	235	2.46	6.4
Camp Sherman	Jefferson	251	233	3.15	8.2
Hebo	Tillamook	207	232	1.63	4.2
Gilchrist	Klamath	216		0.42	1.1
Bly	Klamath	207		0.84	2.2
Tygh Valley	Wasco	236	206	3.73	9.7
Shedd	Linn	213	204	1.51	3.9
Riverside	Umatilla	213	199	0.60	1.6
Barnesdale	Tillamook	193		0.74	1.9
Government Camp	Clackamas	179	193	0.75	1.9
Neahkahnie	Tillamook	197	192	0.65	1.7
Rowena	Wasco	192	187	1.81	4.7
Seventh Mountain	Deschutes	407	187	1.95	5.1
Kirkpatrick	Umatilla	160	179	3.57	9.2
Langlois	Curry	196	177	1.43	3.7
Alsea	Benton	165	164	0.15	0.39
Alpine	Benton	164	171	0.81	2.1
Silver Lake	Lake	159	149	1.48	3.8
Pine Grove	Wasco	142	148	6.03	15.6
Cascadia	Linn	134	147	5.02	13.0
Neskowin	Tillamook	205	134	1.39	3.6
Crane	Harney	116	129	10.42	27.0
Fort Hill	Polk and Yamhill	154	129	1.45	3.8
Beaver	Tillamook	163	122	0.39	1.0
New Pine Creek	Lake	111	120	2.47	6.4
West Scio	Linn	126	120	0.34	0.88
Crescent Lake	Klamath	119		0.34	0.88
Harper	Malheur	113	109	7.00	18.1
Cape Meares	Tillamook	135	99	2.51	6.5
McKay	Umatilla	95			
Peoria	Linn	103	94	0.47	1.2
Brogan	Malheur	97	90	2.86	7.4
Meacham	Umatilla	85		1.21	3.1
Wamic	Wasco	123	85	1.21	3.1
Pistol River	Curry	89	84	0.59	1.5
Summit	Benton	72	82	0.31	0.80
Sprague River	Klamath	80		0.47	1.2
Chemult	Klamath	79		0.26	0.67
Rickreall	Polk	76	77	0.17	0.44
Sportsmans Park	Wasco	76		0.16	0.41
Bellfountain	Benton	74	75	1.30	3.4
Cayuse	Umatilla	66	68	2.88	7.5
Kings Valley	Benton	56	65	0.69	1.8
Wallowa Lake	Wallowa	72	62	1.83	4.7
Blodgett	Benton	42	58	0.56	1.5
Beatty	Klamath	60		0.97	2.5
Juntura	Malheur	39	57	2.29	5.9
Plush	Lake	39	57	1.62	4.2
Beaver Marsh	Klamath	52		0.33	0.85
Eola	Polk	60	45	0.05	0.13
Tetherow	Deschutes	811	45	2.11	5.5
Fort Klamath	Klamath	43			
Pronghorn	Deschutes	92	34	6.60	17.1
Biggs Junction	Sherman	5	22	0.85	2.2

== See also ==
- List of counties in Oregon
- List of cities and unincorporated communities in Oregon
