= Pendleton School District =

School district in Pendleton, Oregon, United States

- Sunridge Middle School, the school district's middle school, in 2010

Address
- 107 NW 10th Street Pendleton, Umatilla County, Oregon, 97801; United States
- Coordinates: 45.672669°N 118.797754°W

District information
- Type: Public
- Motto: Every student every day
- Grades: PK-12
- Superintendent: Michelle Jensen, PhD
- Asst. superintendent(s): Matt Yoshioka
- Schools: 8
- Budget: $79,286,572
- NCES District ID: 4109510

Other information
- Website: pendleton.k12.or.us

Pendleton School District (officially Pendleton SD 27) is a public school district located in Pendleton, Oregon, United States. It is a PK-12 district with 6 schools, a charter school, and an online school.

== History ==
In the 1900's three schools were built.

In 1937, Helen McCune Junior High School was built on lands willed to the city by John Vert. The building now hosts the Pendleton city hall and Library.

== Service Area ==
The district covers the cities of Pendleton and Adams, and the Census-designated places of Cayuse, Gopher Flats, Green Meadows, Kirkpatrick, Meacham, Mission, Riverside, and Tutuilla. Additionally, it covers the southern half of the Umatilla Indian Reservation and the Interstate 84 corridor to the county line.

== Schools ==
=== High Schools ===
- Pendleton High School

=== Middle Schools ===
- Sunridge Middle School

=== Elementary Schools ===
- Pendleton Early Learning Center
- McKay Creek Elementary
- Sherwood Heights Elementary
- Washington Elementary

=== Charter Schools ===
- Nixyaawii Community School

=== Alternative Schools ===
- Pendleton Virtual Learning Academy

== See also ==
- List of school districts in Oregon
