= Umatilla Indian Reservation =

Indian reservation in the United States

Coordinates: 45.7°N 118.5°W

- Indian reservation
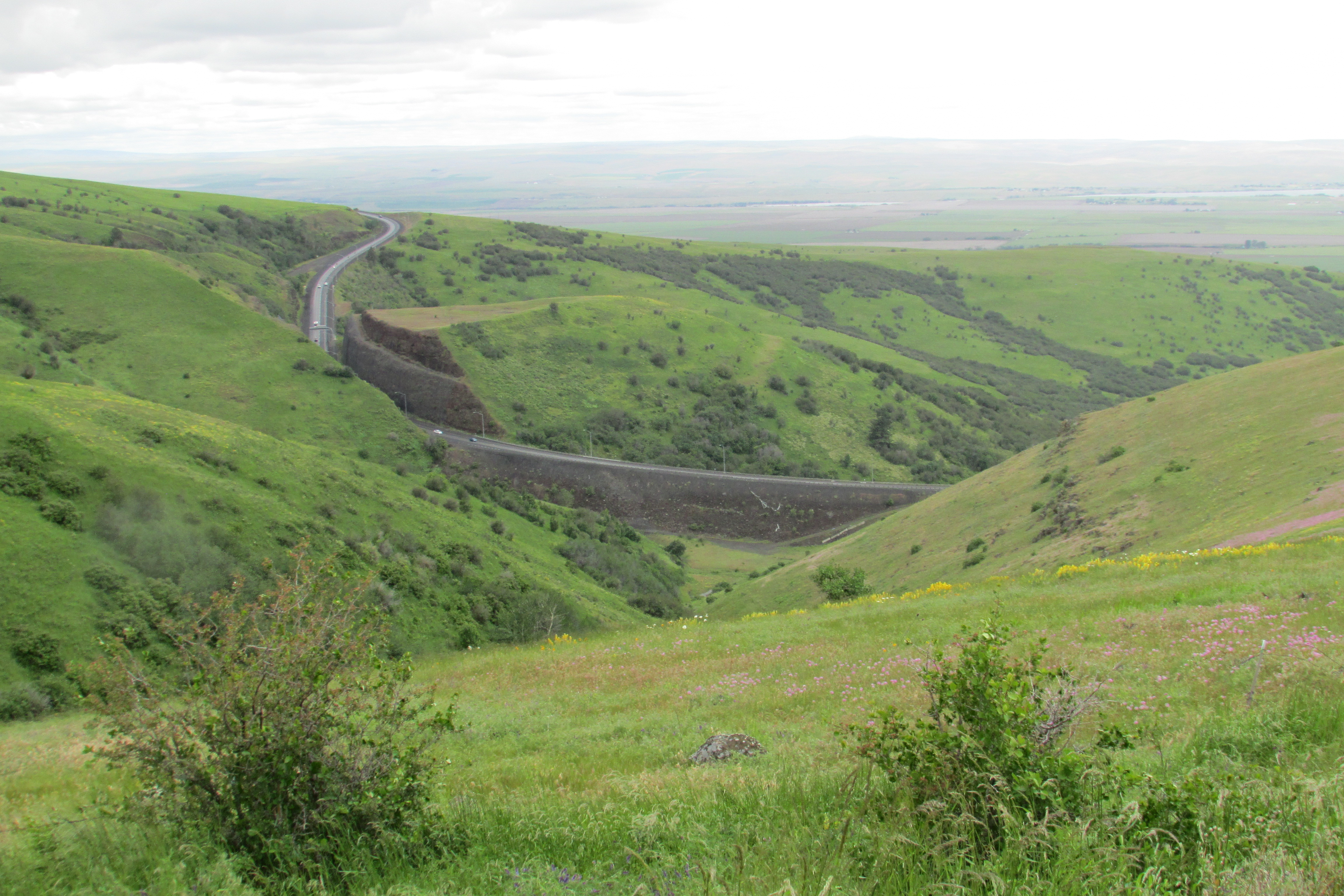
- Old Emigrant Road in the reservation

- Location in the United States Location in Oregon
- Tribe: Confederated Tribes of the Umatilla Indian Reservation
- Country: United States
- State: Oregon
- County: Umatilla and Union
- Headquarters: Mission

Area
  - Total: 702.01 km^{2} (271.047 sq mi)
- Website: Confederated Tribes of the Umatilla Indian Reservation

The Umatilla Indian Reservation is an Indian reservation in the Pacific Northwest of the United States. It was created by The Treaty of 9 June 1855 between the United States and members of the Walla Walla, Cayuse, and Umatilla tribes. It lies in northeastern Oregon, east of Pendleton. The reservation is mostly in Umatilla County, with a very small part extending south into Union County. It is managed by the three Confederated Tribes of the Umatilla Indian Reservation.

Located on the north side of the Blue Mountains, the reservation was established for two Sahaptin-speaking Native American tribes: the Umatilla and Walla Walla, and for the Cayuse, whose language, now extinct, was an isolate. All the tribes historically inhabited the Columbia Plateau region. The tribes share land and a governmental structure as part of their confederation.

== Geography, demographics and headquarters ==
Map of the Umatilla Reservation with neighbouring reservations (In red), east of Pendleton

The reservation has a land area of 271.047 square miles (702.01 km^{2}) and a tribal population of 2,927 as of the 2000 census. In addition, some 300 Native Americans from other regional tribes and 1,500 non-natives live on the reservation. The largest community is Mission, which is the site of the tribal headquarters as well as the Umatilla Agency of the Bureau of Indian Affairs. Some BIA agency offices serve more than one federally recognized tribe, but the Umatilla Agency exclusively serves the Confederated Tribes of the Umatilla Indian Reservation (CTUIR).

The CTUIR is one of several tribal governments in the northwestern United States to offer free bus service on its reservation.

== History ==
The tribes developed the Wildhorse Casino Resort on their reservation to generate revenues for their people. The casino is located near Interstate 84. In 2006 it started Cayuse Technologies, to provide software development and related services. These enterprises employ 1,000 persons and have markedly reduced unemployment.

Pendleton photographer Walter S. Bowman photographed tribe members in the early 20th century. The CTUIR founded the Tamástslikt Cultural Institute, a museum that provides both historical and contemporary exhibits related to the confederated tribes, as well as exhibits of contemporary Native American arts and traditional craftwork.

== Communities ==
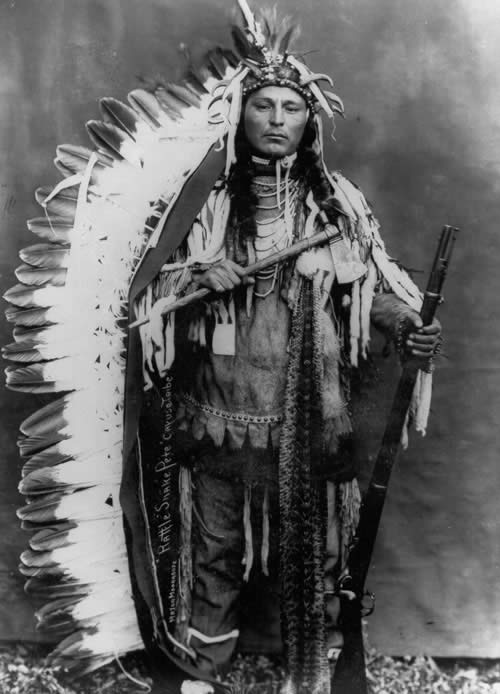
Rattlesnake Pete from the Umatilla Indian Reservation

- Cayuse
- Gibbon
- Gopher Flats
- Kirkpatrick
- Mission
- Riverside
- Tutuilla

== See also ==
- Henry Roe Cloud, Superintendent, Umatilla Indian Reservation
- Shoni Schimmel, WNBA player born and raised on the reservation until leaving with her family while in high school
