= Pine Hollow =

Pine Hollow may refer to:

- Pine Hollow (Oregon County, Missouri)
- Pine Hollow, Oregon
- Pine Hollow Cemetery, listed on the National Register of Historic Places in Oyster Bay, New York
- Pine Hollow, a spin-off series (1998–2001) of The Saddle Club pony books
