= Nixyaawii Community School =

Charter school in Oregon

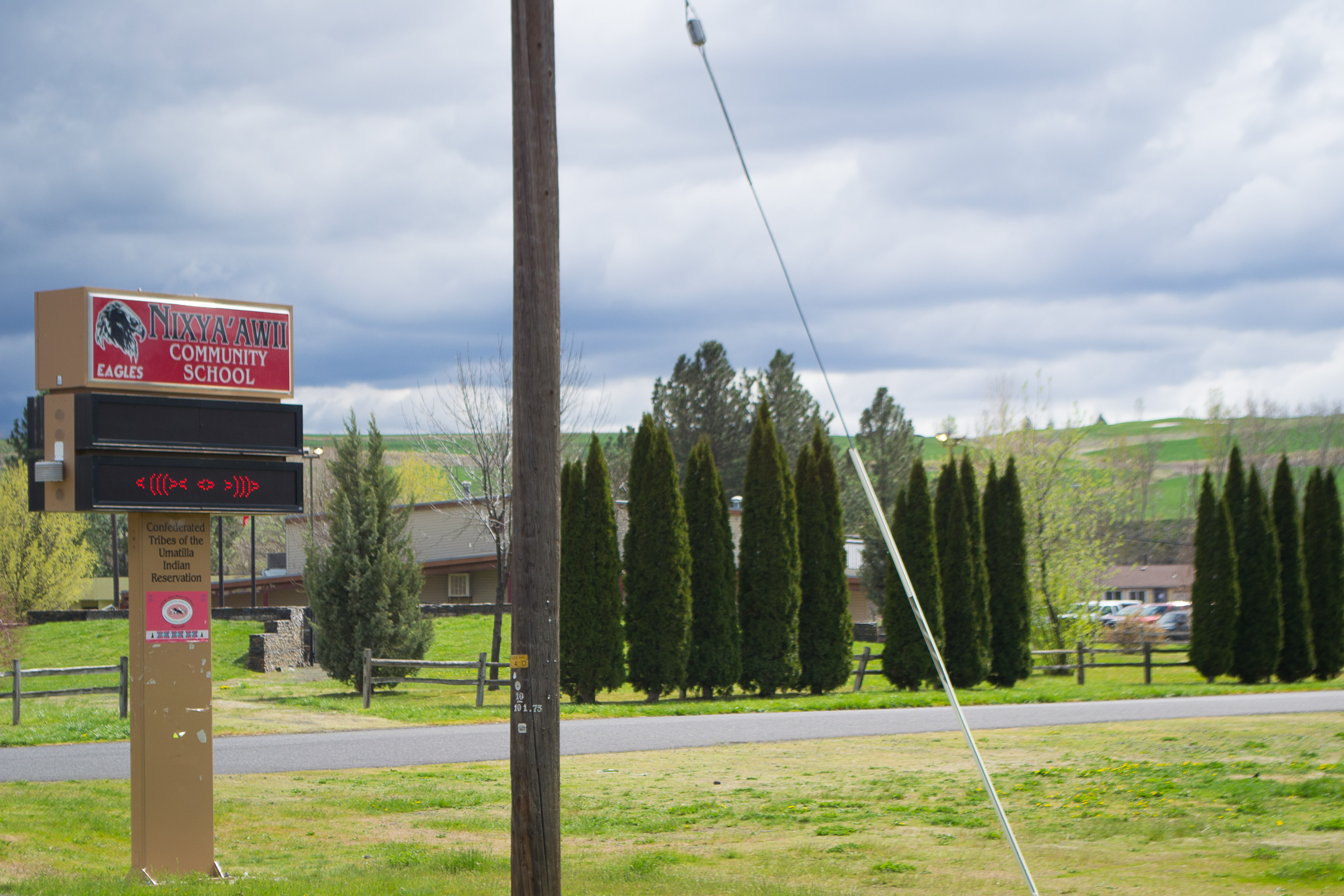

Location
- 73300 July Grounds Lane; Pendleton, Umatilla County, Oregon 97801; United States
- Coordinates: 45.665277°N 118.66392°W

Information
- Type: Public
- School district: Pendleton School District
- Principal: Ryan Heinrich
- Grades: 9-12
- Enrollment: 93 (2019-2020)
- Colors: Maroon and gold
- Athletics conference: OSAA Old Oregon League 1A-7
- Mascot: Golden Eagles
- Rival: Sherman and Horizon Christian

Nixya'awii Community School is a public charter school in Pendleton, Oregon, United States serving the Native American population.

== Academics ==
In 2008, 58% of the school's seniors received their high school diploma. Of 19 students, 11 graduated, 7 dropped out, and 1 is still in high school. Of the class of 2020, 24 graduated and 5 dropped out.
