= Gibbon, Oregon =

Unincorporated community in the state of Oregon, United States

- Unincorporated community
- Location within the state of Oregon
- Coordinates: 45°41′58″N 118°21′54″W
- Country: United States
- State: Oregon
- County: Umatilla
- Elevation: 1,759 ft (536 m)
- Time zone: UTC-8 (Pacific (PST))
  - Summer (DST): UTC-7 (PDT)
- Area codes: 458 and 541
- GNIS feature ID: 1142712

Gibbon is an unincorporated community in Umatilla County, Oregon, United States. It is about 20 miles (32 km) east of Pendleton on the Umatilla Indian Reservation, near the Umatilla River.

Gibbon is a station on the Union Pacific railroad that was named for Major General John Gibbon, who was in command of the Department of the Columbia based in Vancouver, Washington, in 1885–86. At the time the railroad was being constructed, a station at or near Gibbon was named Mikecha, made up from the names of three civil engineers named Mink, Kennedy, and Chalk. At the beginning of the 20th century, the name of the station was changed to Bingham Springs, because it served the Bingham Springs resort, which is 8 miles (13 km) east up the Umatilla River. The name of the post office, however, remained Gibbon. Gibbon post office ran from 1892 through 1966. At some point, the name of the railroad station was changed back to Gibbon. Today, Gibbon has an Adams mailing address.

As of 1940, Gibbon had a school that served both Native American and other children.

== Climate ==
This region experiences warm and dry summers, with no average monthly temperatures above 71.6 °F (22.0 °C). According to the Köppen climate classification, Gibbon has a warm-summer Mediterranean climate, Csb on climate maps.

== Education ==
The community is served by the Athena Weston School District.
