= Pine Hollow Reservoir =

- Location of Pine Hollow Reservoir in Oregon Pine Hollow Reservoir (the United States)
- Location: Wasco County, Oregon, United States
- Coordinates: 45°14′34″N 121°17′27″W
- Type: Mesotrophic reservoir
- Catchment area: 4.5 square miles (12 km^{2})
- Basin countries: United States
- Surface area: 227.1 acres (91.9 ha)
- Average depth: 21 feet (6.4 m)
- Max. depth: 60 feet (18 m)
- Water volume: 4,800 acre-feet (5,900,000 m^{3})
- Shore length^{1}: 3.2 miles (5.1 km)
- Surface elevation: 1,831 feet (558 m)
- ^{1} Shore length is not a well-defined measure.

Pine Hollow Reservoir is an impoundment of water from Threemile and Pine Hollow creeks on the east flank of the Cascade Range in Wasco County, Oregon, United States. The reservoir, created in the 1960s to provide water for Errol Davis mint fields, lies on private land about 12 miles (19 km) west-northwest of Maupin near the boundary of the Mount Hood National Forest. Public access and fishing are permitted along most of the 3.2-mile (5.1 km) shoreline of the reservoir.

Managed jointly by the Oregon Department of Fish and Wildlife (ODFW) and the irrigation district, the reservoir is adjacent to year-round and vacation homes, a census-designated place called Pine Hollow, but is accessible to the public via a 10-foot (3.0 m) easement bought by the ODFW. The lake has two public boat ramps and a private resort with a campground, boat rentals, and a general store. Fish species that thrive in the reservoir include rainbow trout, brown bullheads, largemouth bass, and bluegills.

== See also ==
- List of lakes in Oregon
