= McKay Creek National Wildlife Refuge =

National Wildlife Refuge in Oregon, USA

- IUCN category IV (habitat/species management area)
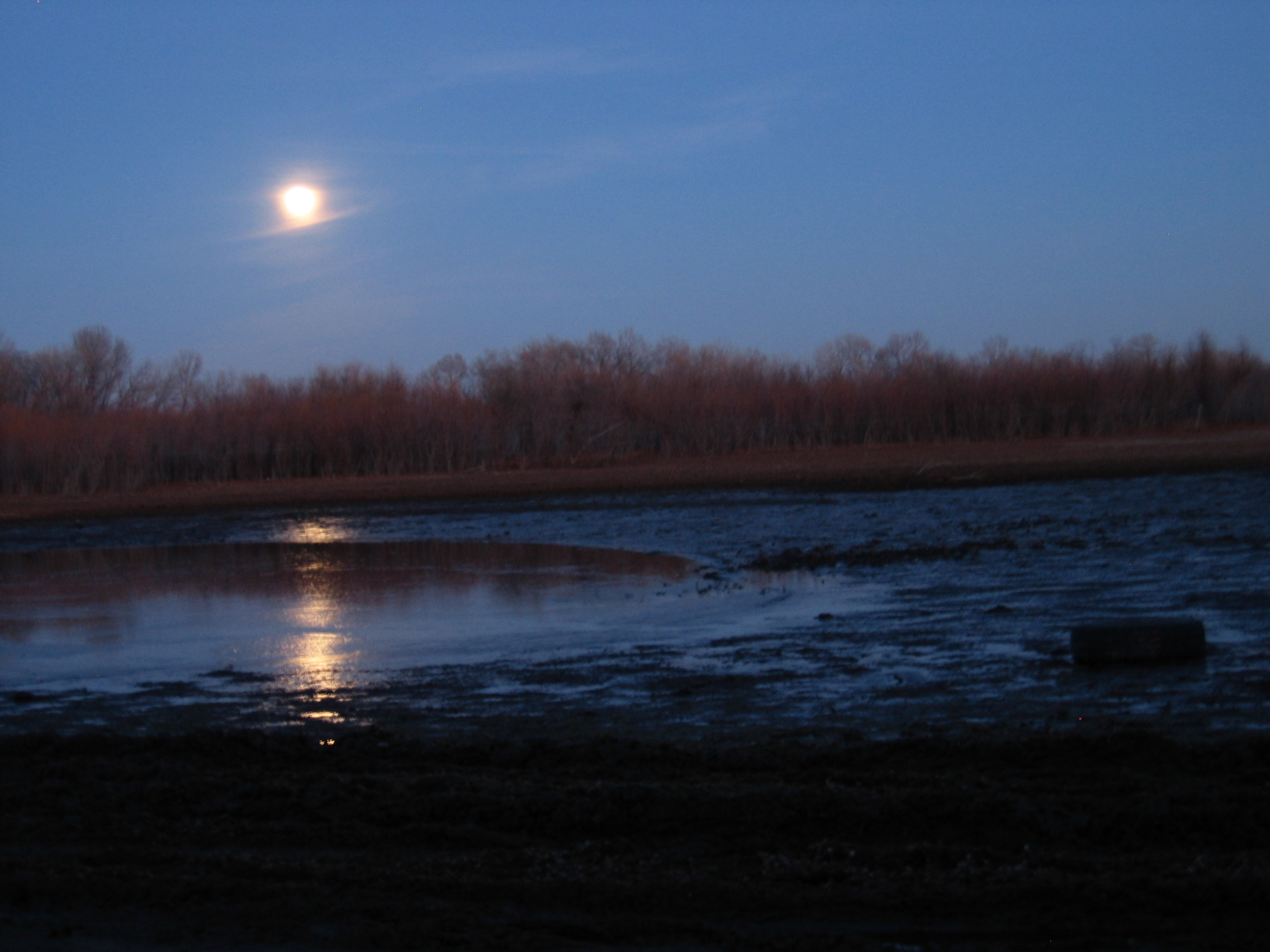

- Location within Oregon
- Location: Umatilla County, Oregon
- Nearest city: Pendleton
- Coordinates: 45°36′19″N 118°47′43″W
- Area: 1,836.5 acres (743.2 ha)
- Established: 1991
- Visitors: 50,000
- Governing body: U.S. Fish and Wildlife Service
- Website: McKay Creek NWR

McKay Creek National Wildlife Refuge is a United States National Wildlife Refuge located between plains and the Blue Mountains of Eastern Oregon. The refuge provides habitat for rare and endangered species and breeding and migratory birds. The lack of other local wetland habitats elevates the importance of this refuge as a home to a variety of wildlife and plant species in an arid environment.

McKay Creek National Wildlife Refuge, dam and reservoir are named for Dr. William C. McKay, an early pioneer in the Pendleton, Oregon, area. McKay settled near the mouth of McKay Creek in about 1851. The location was known to natives as Houtama. McKay died in 1893.

Aquatic habitats serve as resting and feeding areas for wintering waterfowl, while surrounding shrub-steppe and riparian corridors provide habitat for small mammals, mule deer, songbirds, and birds of prey.

Osprey nest in the refuge's cottonwoods, and bald eagles are seen in the area in fall and winter. During late summer, exposed mud flats provide a source of food for migrating shorebirds. Because it is situated five miles south of the city of Pendleton, the refuge receives almost 50,000 annual visitors, most during the summer months.

Upland bird hunting remains popular, with as many as 500 hunters each year pursuing pheasant and quail. Other activities include driving, walking, picnicking or observing the wildlife and scenery.

== See also ==
- McKay, Oregon
- McKay Reservoir
- Pendleton, Oregon
