= McKay Reservoir =

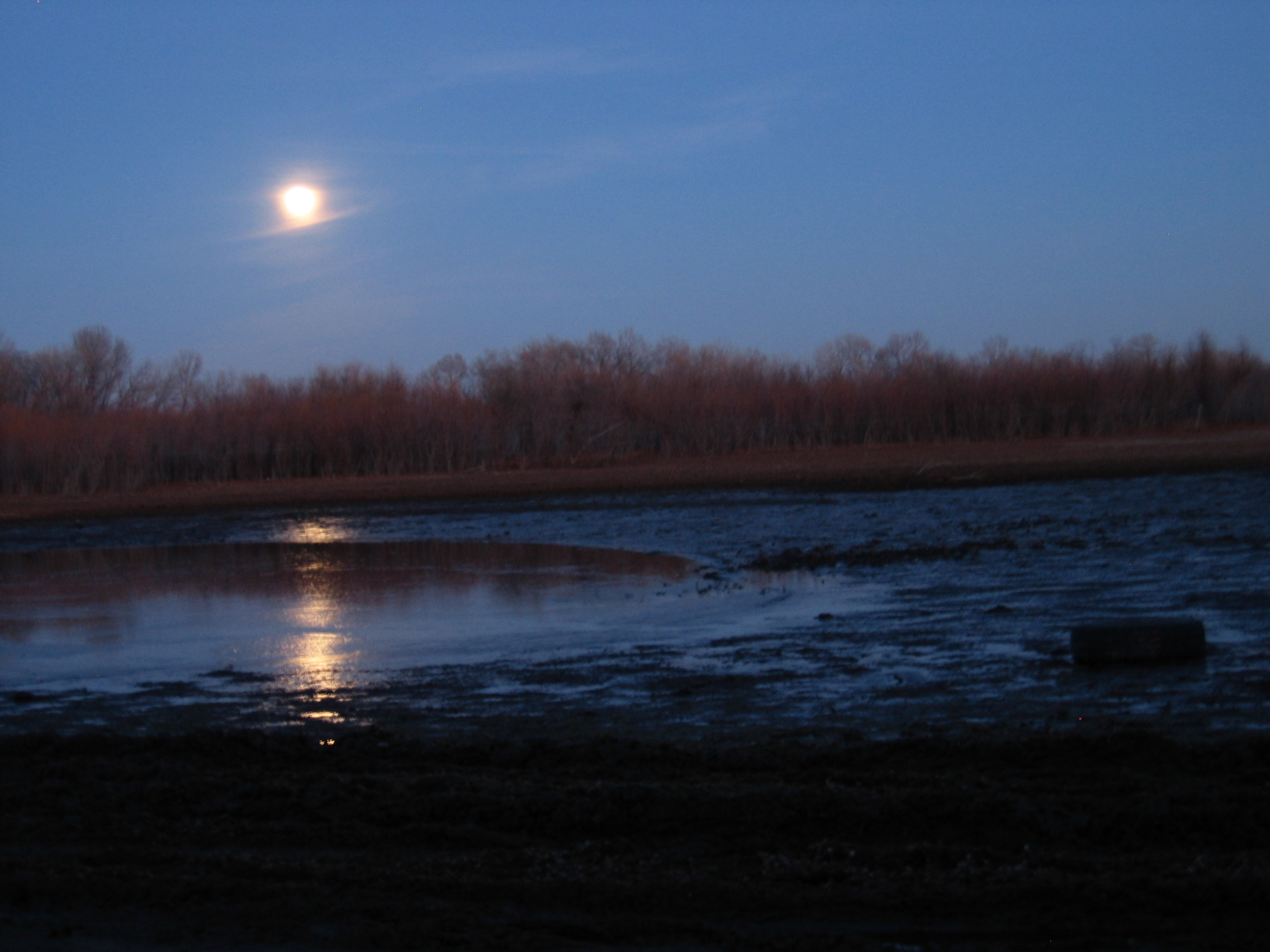
- Dusk on a south shore

- Location within Oregon Location within the United States
- Location: Umatilla County, Oregon
- Coordinates: 45.605408°N 118.798318°W
- Type: reservoir
- Primary inflows: McKay Creek
- Primary outflows: McKay Creek
- Basin countries: United States
- Max. length: 2.2 miles (3.5 km)
- Max. width: 0.5 miles (800 m)
- Water volume: 65,534 acre⋅ft (80,835,000 m^{3})
- Surface elevation: 1,240 feet (380 m)

McKay Reservoir is a reservoir in Umatilla County of the U.S. state of Oregon. It is an impoundment of McKay Creek, a tributary of the Umatilla River. The reservoir is located 6 miles (9.7 km) south of Pendleton on U.S. Route 395. The reservoir has a capacity of 65,534 acre-feet (80,835,000 m^{3}) of water. The reservoir and land that immediately surrounds it are designated as the McKay Creek National Wildlife Refuge. The reservoir and creek that it impounds are named for Dr. William C. McKay. McKay was an early settler in the Pendleton, Oregon area. He settled near the mouth of McKay Creek about 1851. The place was originally called Houtama. He died in Pendleton in 1893.

== Hydrology ==
The McKay Dam was built between 1923–1927 as a project of the United States Bureau of Reclamation, part of the Umatilla Basin Project that had started in 1908 with the nearby Cold Springs Dam. It furnishes supplementary water to Stanfield and Westland Irrigation Districts.

The McKay Dam is an impoundment of McKay Creek, a tributary of the Umatilla River. An earth-fill dam with sections of reinforced concrete, it stands 158 feet high and has an active capacity of 71,534 acre-feet (88,236,000 m^{3}), of which 6,000 acre-feet (7,400,000 m^{3}) is used for exclusive flood control. The spillway section of the McKay Dam was modified 1978 through 1979 to increase the capacity from 10,000 to 27,000 cubic feet per second.

== Natural history ==
The reservoir is jointly managed by the Bureau of Reclamation and the McKay Creek National Wildlife Refuge for irrigation water and a habitat for a variety wildlife including osprey, bald eagles, and an abundance of waterfowl. Fishing is permitted between March thorough September. McKay’s shallow water marshes and wetlands are also productive for warmwater fish such as crappie, largemouth bass, sunfish, and yellow perch, as well as brown bullhead catfish, and lesser numbers of largemouth and smallmouth bass. Also Large numbers or Carp are found in the reservoir.

== See also ==
- List of lakes in Oregon
- McKay, Oregon
- McKay Creek National Wildlife Refuge
- Pendleton, Oregon
