= Bingham Springs, Oregon =

Unincorporated community in the state of Oregon, United States

Coordinates: 45.742077°N 118.231897°W

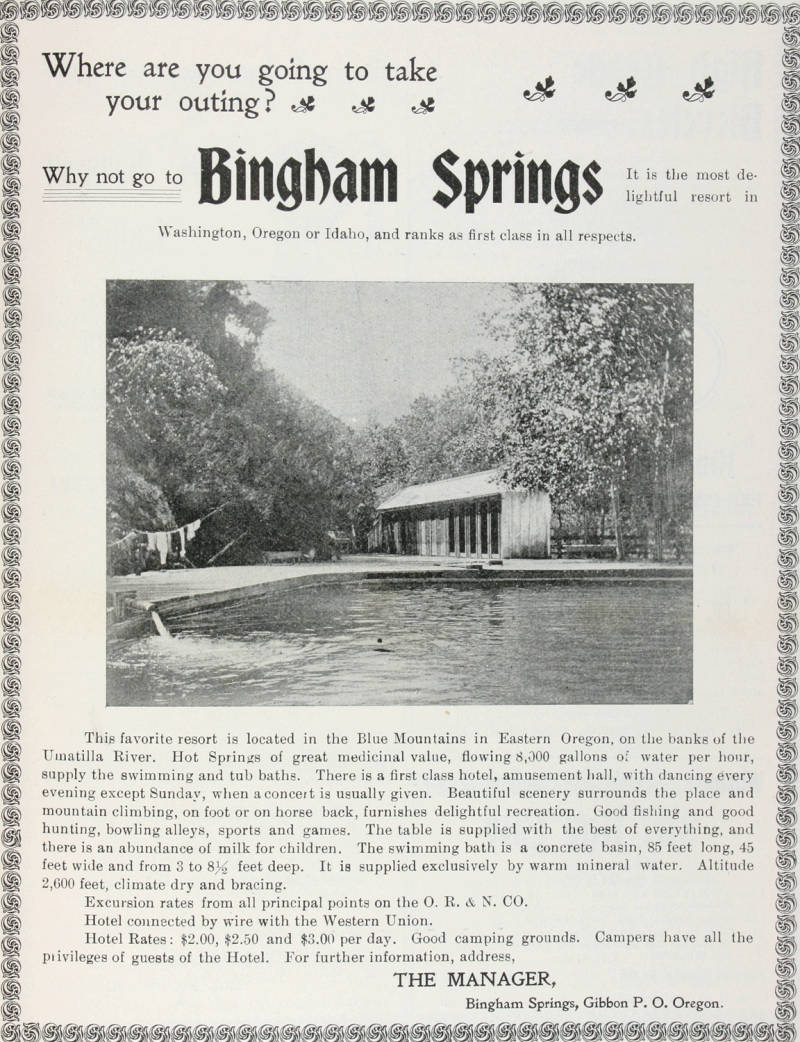
An 1899 advertisement for the Bingham Springs resort

Bingham Springs is an unincorporated community in Umatilla County, Oregon, United States. It is about 8 miles (13 km) east of Gibbon in the Blue Mountains near the Umatilla River.

Bingham Springs was a station and tollgate on the Thomas and Ruckle stagecoach line through the Blue Mountains. The stage house was built in 1864. Alfred B. Meacham operated the station from 1867 to 1868. There was a post office at the locale named "Purdy" from 1881 until 1891, named after one of the early owners of the stage house. Later, the community had a Gibbon mailing address, and today it receives its mail through Adams.

Beginning in the late 19th century, Bingham Springs was the site of a popular hot spring resort. Today the hot mineral water is a feature of the pool at Bar M Ranch, a dude ranch founded in the 1940s that uses the historic stage house as its ranch house. Notable guests of the resort include President Calvin Coolidge and then-Secretary of State Herbert Hoover.

== Climate ==
This region experiences warm (but not hot) and dry summers, with no average monthly temperatures above 71.6 °F (22.0 °C). According to the Köppen Climate Classification system, Bingham Springs has a warm-summer Mediterranean climate, abbreviated "Csb" on climate maps.
