= Nolin, Oregon =

Unincorporated community in the state of Oregon, United States

- Unincorporated community
- Location within Oregon Location within the United States
- Coordinates: 45°40′59″N 119°06′02″W
- Country: United States
- State: Oregon
- County: Umatilla
- Elevation: 738 ft (225 m)
- Time zone: UTC-8 (Pacific (PST))
  - Summer (DST): UTC-7 (PDT)
- ZIP code: 97826
- Area codes: 458 and 541
- GNIS feature ID: 1136575

Nolin is an unincorporated community in Umatilla County, Oregon, United States. Nolin is about 8 miles (13 km) southeast of Echo, next to the Umatilla River. At one time the area was known as "Happy Canyon". Adam "Ad" W. Nye, a settler of the 1860s, named the Nolin area Happy Canyon, for the spirit of the people who lived there. The name was later adopted by Pendleton Round-Up for its indoor show in commemoration of this time. Nye was County Sheriff in 1872–74. The nearby community of Nye was named for him.

At one time Nolin had a post office, a store, and a school. Nolin also has a cemetery. An Oregon Railway and Navigation Company (now Union Pacific) railroad line was built through Nolin, crossing the Umatilla River on a steel bridge constructed in 1907.

The Cunningham Sheep Ranch, founded in the 1880s by Charles Cunningham, is based in Nolin. It was once one of the largest sheep-raising operations in the United States. Today it raises rambouillet sheep.
