= McKay, Oregon =

Unincorporated community in the state of Oregon, United States

- Unincorporated community
- Location within Oregon Location within the United States
- Coordinates: 45°30′27″N 118°41′16″W
- Country: United States
- State: Oregon
- County: Umatilla
- Elevation: 1,923 ft (586 m)
- Time zone: UTC-8 (Pacific (PST))
  - Summer (DST): UTC-7 (PDT)
- ZIP code: 97868
- Area codes: 458 and 541
- GNIS feature ID: 2805456

McKay is an unincorporated community in Umatilla County, Oregon, United States. Its name accompanies McKay Creek, which is named for Dr. William Cameron McKay, located in Umatilla County at North McKay Creek Road (County 1050 Rd.) on Ross Road.

As of the 2020 census, McKay had a population of 95.

It has been the site of discovery of ancient bird fossils.

== See also ==
- McKay Creek National Wildlife Refuge
- McKay Reservoir
- Pendleton, Oregon
