= Mission, Oregon =

Unincorporated community in the state of Oregon, United States

- Census-designated place (CDP)
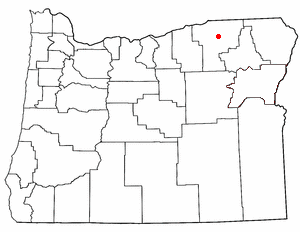
- Location of Mission, Oregon
- Coordinates: 45°39′30″N 118°39′55″W
- Country: United States
- State: Oregon
- County: Umatilla

Area
  - Total: 7.61 sq mi (19.72 km^{2})
  - Land: 7.61 sq mi (19.72 km^{2})
  - Water: 0 sq mi (0.00 km^{2})
- Elevation: 1,414 ft (431 m)

Population (2020)
  - Total: 960
  - Density: 126.1/sq mi (48.69/km^{2})
- Time zone: UTC−08:00 (Pacific (PST))
  - Summer (DST): UTC−07:00 (PDT)
- ZIP Code: 97801
- Area codes: 541, 458
- FIPS code: 41-49000
- GNIS feature ID: 2408844

Mission is an unincorporated community in Umatilla County, Oregon, United States. For statistical purposes, the United States Census Bureau has defined Mission as a census-designated place (CDP). As of the 2020 census, Mission had a population of 960.

Mission is part of the Pendleton–Hermiston Micropolitan Statistical Area.

== Geography ==
Mission is located on the Umatilla Indian Reservation. According to the United States Census Bureau, the CDP has a total area of 7.6 square miles (20 km^{2}), all land.

== Education ==
The CDP is served by the Pendleton School District.

== Demographics ==
Historical population
Census	Pop.	Note	%±
2020	960		—
U.S. Decennial Census

As of the census of 2000, there were 1,019 people, 330 households, and 242 families residing in the CDP. The population density was 133.3 inhabitants per square mile (51.5/km^{2}). There were 336 housing units at an average density of 44.0 per square mile (17.0/km^{2}). The racial makeup of the CDP was 22.37% White, 73.80% Native American, 0.20% Asian, 0.49% from other races, and 3.14% from two or more races. Hispanic or Latino of any race were 2.65% of the population.

There were 330 households, out of which 43.0% had children under the age of 18 living with them, 38.8% were married couples living together, 26.7% had a female householder with no husband present, and 26.4% were non-families. 22.1% of all households were made up of individuals, and 10.0% had someone living alone who was 65 years of age or older. The average household size was 3.09 and the average family size was 3.56.

In the CDP, the population was spread out, with 37.8% under the age of 18, 9.0% from 18 to 24, 27.4% from 25 to 44, 18.9% from 45 to 64, and 6.9% who were 65 years of age or older. The median age was 27 years. For every 100 females, there were 87.3 males. For every 100 females age 18 and over, there were 82.2 males.

The median income for a household in the CDP was $32,500, and the median income for a family was $35,417. Males had a median income of $29,125 versus $24,766 for females. The per capita income for the CDP was $12,288. About 18.9% of families and 23.3% of the population were below the poverty line, including 30.0% of those under age 18 and 18.2% of those age 65 or over.
