= Green Meadows, Oregon =

- Census-designated place
- Location within Oregon Location within the United States
- Coordinates: 45°36′59″N 118°48′10″W
- Country: United States
- State: Oregon
- County: Umatilla

Area
  - Total: 1.23 sq mi (3.18 km^{2})
  - Land: 1.23 sq mi (3.18 km^{2})
  - Water: 0 sq mi (0.00 km^{2})
- Elevation: 1,161 ft (354 m)

Population (2020)
  - Total: 675
  - Density: 550.6/sq mi (212.59/km^{2})
- Time zone: UTC-8 (Pacific (PST))
  - Summer (DST): UTC-7 (PDT)
- ZIP Code: 97801 (Pendleton)
- Area codes: 541/458
- FIPS code: 41-31115
- GNIS feature ID: 2611733

Green Meadows is an unincorporated community and census-designated place (CDP) in Umatilla County, Oregon, United States. It was first listed as a CDP following the 2010 census.

As of the 2020 census, Green Meadows had a population of 675.

The CDP is in central Umatilla County along U.S. Route 395, 5 miles (8 km) south of Pendleton, the county seat. It is on the east side of the valley of McKay Creek, a north-flowing tributary of the Umatilla River, which in turn is a west-flowing tributary of the Columbia.

== Demographics ==
Historical population
| Census | Pop. | Note | %± |
|---|---|---|---|
| 2020 | 675 | | — |
U.S. Decennial Census
