= Umatilla County, Oregon =

County in Oregon, United States

- County
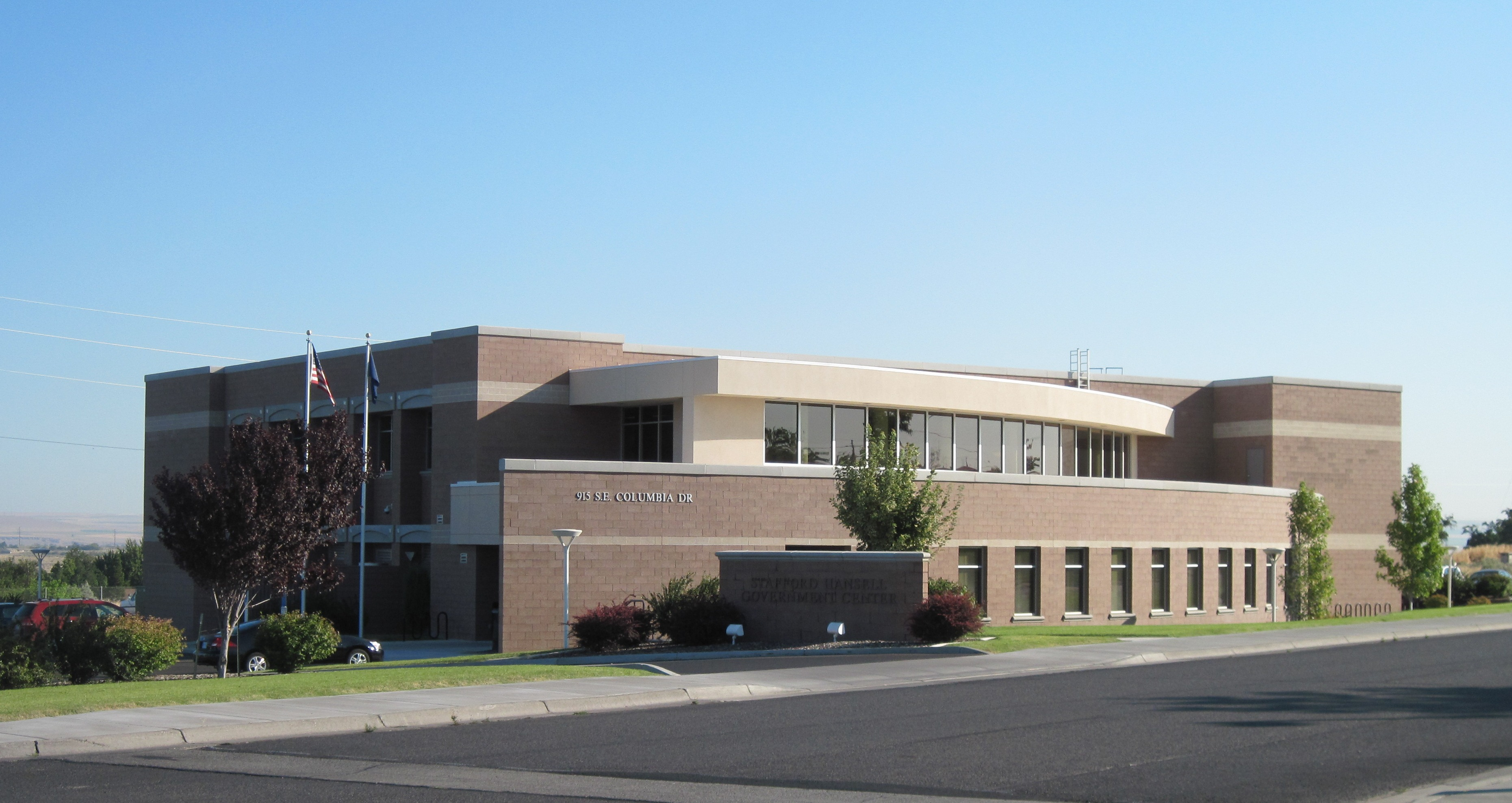
- Stafford Hansell Government Center in Hermiston

- Location within the U.S. state of Oregon
- Coordinates: 45°22′30″N 118°45′05″W
- Country: United States
- State: Oregon
- Founded: September 27, 1862
- Named for: Umatilla River
- Seat: Pendleton
- Largest city: Hermiston

Area
  - Total: 3,231 sq mi (8,370 km^{2})
  - Land: 3,216 sq mi (8,330 km^{2})
  - Water: 16 sq mi (41 km^{2}) 0.5%

Population (2020)
  - Total: 80,075
  - Estimate (2025): 81,119 ▲
  - Density: 25/sq mi (9.7/km^{2})
- Time zone: UTC−8 (Pacific)
  - Summer (DST): UTC−7 (PDT)
- Congressional district: 2nd
- Website: www.co.umatilla.or.us

Umatilla County (/ˌjuːməˈtɪlə/) is one of the 36 counties in the U.S. state of Oregon. Its 2020 population of 80,075 ranks it as the 14th largest in Oregon, and largest in Eastern Oregon. Hermiston is the largest and fastest growing city in Umatilla County, but Pendleton remains the county seat. Umatilla County is part of the Hermiston-Pendleton, OR Micropolitan Statistical Area, which has a combined population of 94,833. It is included in the eight-county definition of Eastern Oregon.

The county is named for the Umatilla River.

== History ==
Umatilla County was created on September 27, 1862, out of a portion of Wasco County. Adjustments were made to the county's boundaries following the creation of Grant, Morrow, Union, and Wallowa Counties. This legislative act also designated Marshall Station as the temporary county seat. An 1865 election selected Umatilla City, now known as Umatilla, as the county seat. With the development of wheat farming, population shifted to the north and east parts of the county, and a subsequent election in 1868 moved the county seat again to Pendleton.

The Umatilla Indian Reservation was established by the Treaty of Walla Walla in 1855. The Umatillas, Walla Wallas, and Cayuse tribes were resettled there, and is located immediately southeast of Pendleton.

EZ Wireless of Hermiston officially opened on February 4, 2004, one of the largest known Wi-Fi wide area networks in the United States, covering parts of Umatilla County, Morrow County and Benton County, Washington. Although created to facilitate communications among local police, firemen and EMT workers who immediately respond to possible accidents or terrorist attacks on the Umatilla Chemical Depot, where the U.S. Army maintained a national arsenal of nerve gas, the network can be accessed in some places by the public for free.

== Geography ==
Map of Umatilla County

According to the United States Census Bureau, the county has a total area of 3,231 square miles (8,370 km^{2}), of which 3,216 square miles (8,330 km^{2}) are land and 16 square miles (41 km^{2}) (0.5%) are covered by water. It borders the Columbia River across from Washington.

=== Adjacent counties ===
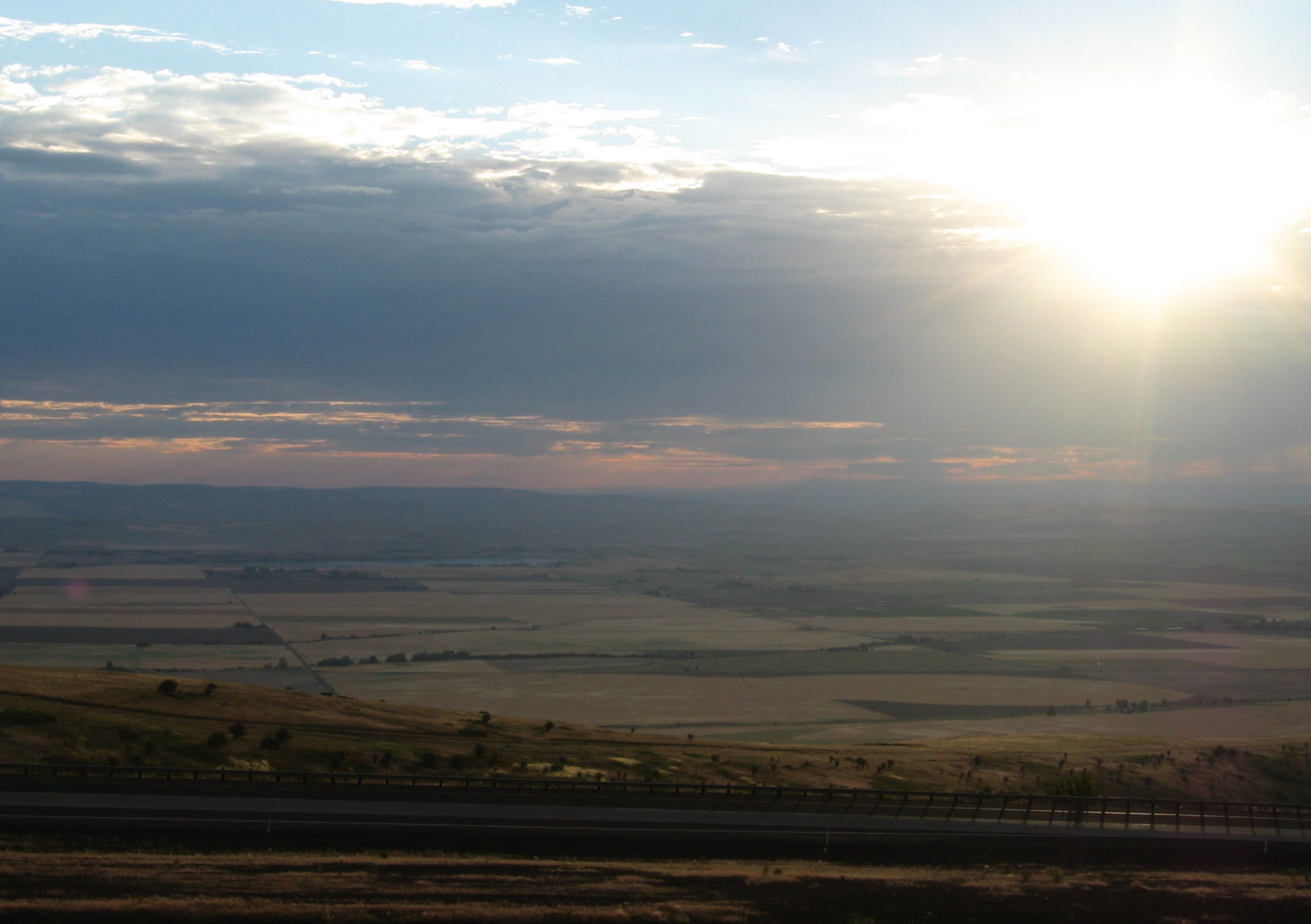
I-84 eastbound and McKay Reservoir in Umatilla County

- Benton County, Washington (north)
- Walla Walla County, Washington (north)
- Columbia County, Washington (northeast)
- Wallowa County (east)
- Union County (east)
- Grant County (south)
- Morrow County (west)

=== National protected areas ===
- Cold Springs National Wildlife Refuge
- McKay Creek National Wildlife Refuge
- Umatilla National Forest (part)
- Whitman National Forest (part)

== Demographics ==
Historical population
Census	Pop.	Note	%±
1870	2,916		—
1880	9,607		229.5%
1890	13,381		39.3%
1900	18,049		34.9%
1910	20,309		12.5%
1920	25,946		27.8%
1930	24,399		−6.0%
1940	26,030		6.7%
1950	41,703		60.2%
1960	44,352		6.4%
1970	44,923		1.3%
1980	58,861		31.0%
1990	59,249		0.7%
2000	70,548		19.1%
2010	75,889		7.6%
2020	80,075		5.5%
2025 (est.)	81,119	▲	1.3%
U.S. Decennial Census:

=== 2020 census ===
As of the 2020 census, the county had a population of 80,075. Of the residents, 24.6% were under the age of 18 and 16.6% were 65 years of age or older; the median age was 37.2 years. For every 100 females there were 107.6 males, and for every 100 females age 18 and over there were 109.1 males. 68.3% of residents lived in urban areas and 31.7% lived in rural areas.

The racial makeup of the county was 66.8% White, 0.9% Black or African American, 3.8% American Indian and Alaska Native, 0.9% Asian, 0.2% Native Hawaiian and Pacific Islander, 15.6% from some other race, and 11.8% from two or more races. Hispanic or Latino residents of any race comprised 28.3% of the population.

There were 28,372 households in the county, of which 34.5% had children under the age of 18 living with them and 25.2% had a female householder with no spouse or partner present. About 25.5% of all households were made up of individuals and 11.5% had someone living alone who was 65 years of age or older.

There were 31,098 housing units, of which 8.8% were vacant. Among occupied housing units, 62.8% were owner-occupied and 37.2% were renter-occupied. The homeowner vacancy rate was 1.5% and the rental vacancy rate was 5.1%.

Umatilla County, Oregon – Racial and ethnic composition Note: the US Census treats Hispanic/Latino as an ethnic category. This table excludes Latinos from the racial categories and assigns them to a separate category. Hispanics/Latinos may be of any race.
Race / Ethnicity (NH = Non-Hispanic)	Pop 1980	Pop 1990	Pop 2000	Pop 2010	Pop 2020	% 1980	% 1990	% 2000	% 2010	% 2020
White alone (NH)	54,165	51,303	54,670	52,691	49,753	92.02%	86.59%	77.49%	69.43%	62.13%
Black or African American alone (NH)	132	350	535	557	652	0.22%	0.59%	0.76%	0.73%	0.81%
Native American or Alaska Native alone (NH)	1,500	1,746	2,258	2,383	2,571	2.55%	2.95%	3.20%	3.14%	3.21%
Asian alone (NH)	331	503	518	626	685	0.56%	0.85%	0.73%	0.82%	0.86%
Native Hawaiian or Pacific Islander alone (NH)	x	x	51	95	130	x	x	0.07%	0.13%	0.16%
Other race alone (NH)	51	40	118	55	295	0.09%	0.07%	0.17%	0.07%	0.37%
Mixed race or Multiracial (NH)	x	x	1,032	1,375	3,367	x	x	1.46%	1.81%	4.20%
Hispanic or Latino (any race)	2,682	5,307	11,366	18,107	22,622	4.56%	8.96%	16.11%	23.86%	28.25%
Total	58,861	59,249	70,548	75,889	80,075	100.00%	100.00%	100.00%	100.00%	100.00%

=== 2010 census ===
As of the 2010 census, 75,889 people, 26,904 households, and 18,647 families resided in the county. The population density was 23.6 inhabitants per square mile (9.1/km^{2}). The 29,693 housing units had an average density of 9.2 per square mile (3.6/km^{2}). The racial makeup of the county was 79.1% White, 3.5% American Indian, 0.9% Asian, 0.8% Black or African American, 0.1% Pacific islander, 12.5% from other races, and 3.1% from two or more races. Those of Hispanic or Latino origin made up 23.9% of the population. In terms of ancestry, 21.4% were German, 12.8% were Irish, 11.6% were English, and 5.6% were American.

Of the 26,904 households, 36.4% had children under the age of 18 living with them, 50.9% were married couples living together, 12.0% had a female householder with no husband present, 30.7% were non-families, and 24.7% of all households were made up of individuals. The average household size was 2.67 and the average family size was 3.17. The median age was 35.7 years.

The median income for a household in the county was $45,861 and for a family was $53,585. Males had a median income of $39,288 versus $30,489 for females. The per capita income for the county was $20,035. About 11.0% of families and 15.8% of the population were below the poverty line, including 21.4% of those under age 18 and 9.5% of those age 65 or over.

=== 2021 US Census American Community Survey- Household Incomes ===
Strong economic growth in the west end of the county has propelled Hermiston well past Pendleton with the highest median household incomes in Umatilla County.

2021 Median household incomes
Rank	City	Median Income	% Change from 2010
1	Hermiston	$60,971	+46.5%
2	Pendleton	$58,093	+27.8%
3	Umatilla	$51,790	+25.1%
4	Milton-Freewater	$48,250	+43.3%

== Government and politics ==
=== State legislature ===
Umatilla County contains two Oregon State House Districts: State House District 57, which is currently represented by Greg Smith, and State House District 58, which is currently represented by Bobby Levy. Umatilla County is also located in the 29th District of the Oregon State Senate, represented by Todd Nash. Smith, Levy, and Nash are registered Republicans.

=== Board of commissioners ===
Umatilla County is represented and governed by three county commissioners. The Umatilla County Board of Commissioners is currently made up of Dan Dorran, John Shafer, and Cindy Timmons.

=== Make-up of Umatilla County voters ===
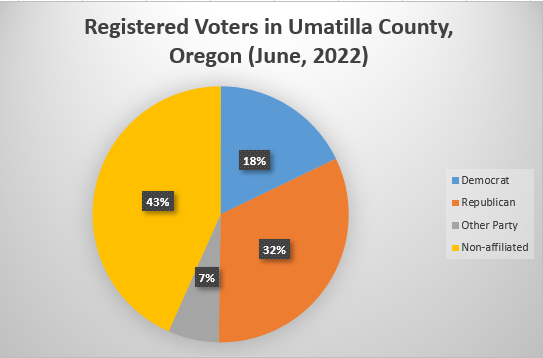
www.oregonvotes.org

Like all counties in eastern Oregon, the majority of registered voters who are part of a political party in Umatilla County are members of the Republican Party. Registrations of Non-affiliated voters have increased significantly since Oregon began Automatic Voter Registration through the DMV in 2016. Despite the increase in Non-affiliated voters, the Republican Party in Umatilla County has continued to see a 2:1 vote margin in Presidential elections between the years 2000 and 2024.

United States presidential election results for Umatilla County, Oregon
Year	Republican		Democratic		Third party(ies)	
Year	No.	%	No.	%	No.	%
1904	2,642	66.27%	840	21.07%	505	12.67%
1908	2,328	55.67%	1,568	37.49%	286	6.84%
1912	1,261	29.30%	1,563	36.32%	1,480	34.39%
1916	3,664	42.33%	4,606	53.22%	385	4.45%
1920	4,979	58.03%	3,255	37.94%	346	4.03%
1924	3,854	44.71%	3,052	35.41%	1,714	19.88%
1928	5,277	67.83%	2,390	30.72%	113	1.45%
1932	2,930	33.01%	5,631	63.43%	316	3.56%
1936	2,943	31.27%	5,753	61.13%	715	7.60%
1940	5,193	51.11%	4,935	48.57%	32	0.31%
1944	5,379	51.77%	4,967	47.80%	45	0.43%
1948	5,726	48.69%	5,891	50.09%	144	1.22%
1952	10,529	59.60%	7,098	40.18%	40	0.23%
1956	9,654	55.70%	7,678	44.30%	0	0.00%
1960	9,374	53.77%	8,053	46.19%	6	0.03%
1964	6,138	36.41%	10,689	63.40%	32	0.19%
1968	8,975	54.80%	6,402	39.09%	1,002	6.12%
1972	10,470	57.94%	6,090	33.70%	1,511	8.36%
1976	9,345	51.83%	7,985	44.28%	701	3.89%
1980	12,950	57.78%	7,382	32.93%	2,082	9.29%
1984	14,211	63.12%	8,246	36.63%	57	0.25%
1988	10,254	54.02%	8,327	43.87%	400	2.11%
1992	7,095	36.12%	6,787	34.55%	5,761	29.33%
1996	9,703	45.14%	8,774	40.82%	3,018	14.04%
2000	14,140	61.32%	7,809	33.86%	1,111	4.82%
2004	17,068	64.84%	8,884	33.75%	370	1.41%
2008	15,254	59.77%	9,484	37.16%	785	3.08%
2012	15,499	62.07%	8,584	34.38%	886	3.55%
2016	17,059	61.81%	7,673	27.80%	2,865	10.38%
2020	21,270	64.38%	10,707	32.41%	1,061	3.21%
2024	20,973	67.17%	9,251	29.63%	1,001	3.21%

== Economy ==
The gold rush of 1862 brought miners and stock raisers to the mountains and grasslands of Umatilla County. Another stimulus was the arrival of the railroad in 1881, opening the region to the development of dry-land wheat farming. Water for irrigation has been key to economic diversification and growth, most recently in the Hermiston area, where potatoes, onions, corn, and more than 200 other crops are grown commercially. Low-cost power through Umatilla Electric Cooperative and good freeway access are also driving growth in the Hermiston area, with amazon.com developing large data-center operations there, and major distribution facilities for Walmart, FedEx, UPS, and Meyer Distributing are all located in Hermiston.

The Greater Hermiston area, which encompasses the Hermiston, Umatilla, Stanfield, & Echo zip codes, and equates to a less than 10-minute commuting distance, has seen strong job growth since 2012. The Hermiston area added 2,930 jobs from 2012 to 2022, which equates to 91% of all net job growth in Umatilla County over that time. More recently, Greater Hermiston accounted for 114% of Umatilla County job gains from 2019 to 2022 as a result of 1,121 jobs added compared to net losses of 74 and 48 jobs in Pendleton and Milton-Freewater respectively.

== Communities ==
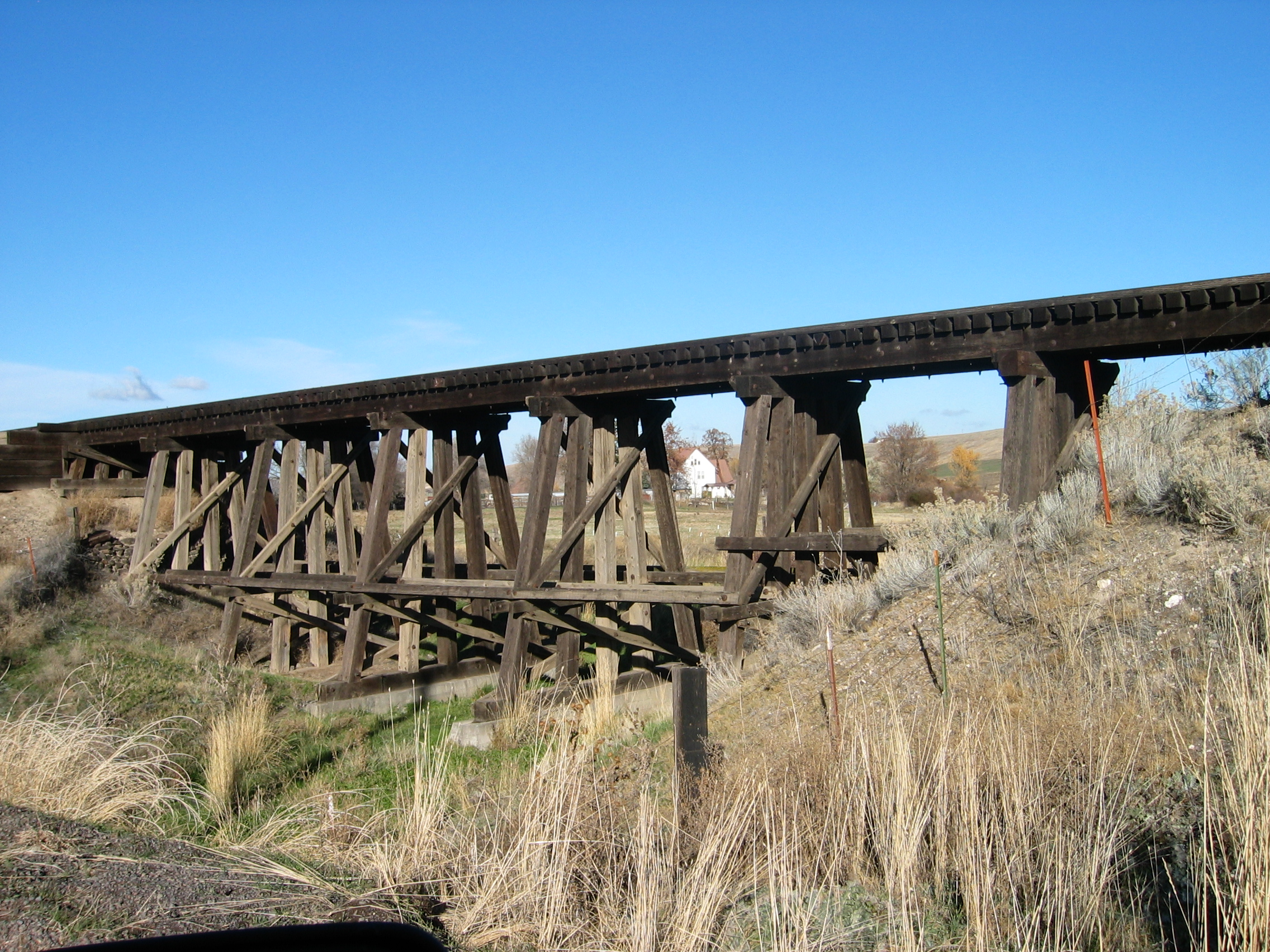
Trestle seen off Sparks Station Rd at Pendleton Country Club, opposite of the McKay Reservoir, Pendleton, Oregon. Transportation linkages in Umatilla are one of the county's major advantages.

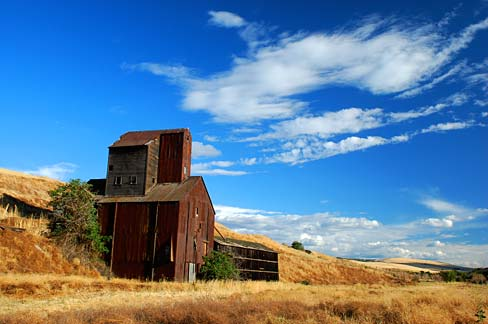
An old grain elevator along Steen Road south of Milton-Freewater, Umatilla County.

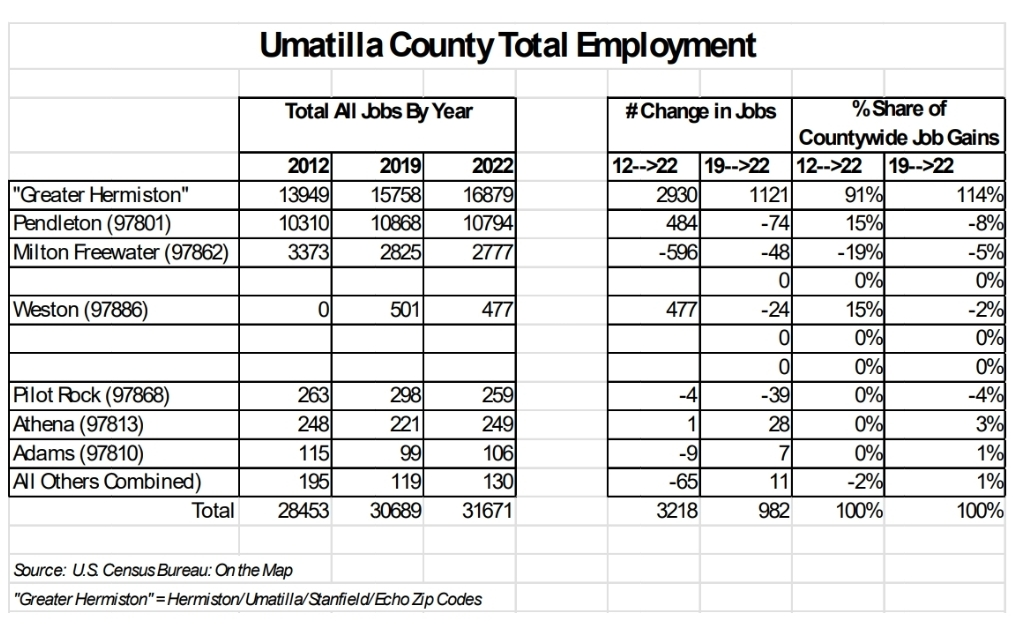
Umatilla County Employment 2012-2022

Umatilla County is generally divided into three distinct economic and cultural areas, which are the West End, the Pendleton area, and the Milton-Freewater area. Although each of these communities shares some economic ties, the distance between each creates three very distinct communities. The West End includes the communities of Hermiston, Umatilla, Stanfield, and Echo. The Pendleton area includes Pendleton, Pilot Rock, Adams, and Athena. The Milton-Freewater area is largely tied to the Walla Walla, Washington area, and is considered a part of the Walla Walla Metropolitan Planning Organization. The similarities between the areas has created a long-standing rivalry, particularly between the West-End and the Pendleton-area, with regard to economic opportunity and public resources. The West End, led by Hermiston as its largest city, is now nearly twice the size of the Pendleton area, and is projected to be nearly three times the size of the Pendleton area by 2035.

=== Cities ===
- Adams
- Athena
- Echo
- Helix
- Hermiston
- Milton-Freewater
- Pendleton (county seat)
- Pilot Rock
- Stanfield
- Ukiah
- Umatilla
- Weston

=== Census-designated places ===
- Cayuse
- Gopher Flats
- Green Meadows
- Kirkpatrick
- McKay
- Meacham
- Mission
- Riverside
- Tutuilla
- Umapine

=== Unincorporated communities ===
- Bingham Springs
- Blakeley
- Bucks Corners
- Cobb
- Cold Springs
- Cold Springs Junction
- Crockett
- Ferndale
- Gibbon
- Hidaway Springs
- Hinkle
- Holdman
- Lehman Springs
- McNary
- Myrick
- Nolin
- Nye
- Power City
- Rieth
- Sunnyside
- Tollgate
- Westland

=== Former communities ===
- Fulton
- Ordnance
- Pine Grove
- Riverview

== Education ==
School districts include:

- Athena Weston School District 29J
- Echo School District 5
- Helix School District 1
- Hermiston School District 8
- Milton-Freewater Unified School District 7
- Pendleton School District 16
- Pilot Rock School District 2
- Stanfield School District 61
- Ukiah School District 80
- Umatilla School District 6

== See also ==
- National Register of Historic Places listings in Umatilla County, Oregon
- Umatilla County Fair
