= Cayuse, Oregon =

Unincorporated community in the state of Oregon, United States

- Census-designated place (CDP)
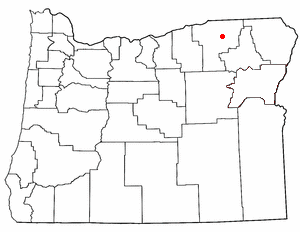
- Location of Cayuse, Oregon
- Coordinates: 45°40′35″N 118°34′25″W
- Country: United States
- State: Oregon
- County: Umatilla

Area
  - Total: 2.88 sq mi (7.46 km^{2})
  - Land: 2.88 sq mi (7.46 km^{2})
  - Water: 0 sq mi (0.00 km^{2})
- Elevation: 1,388 ft (423 m)

Population (2020)
  - Total: 66
  - Density: 22.9/sq mi (8.85/km^{2})
- Time zone: UTC-8 (Pacific (PST))
  - Summer (DST): UTC-7 (PDT)
- ZIP code: 97801
- Area codes: 458 and 541
- FIPS code: 41-11900
- GNIS feature ID: 2407996

Cayuse is a census-designated place (CDP) and unincorporated community in Umatilla County, Oregon, United States, located 11 miles (18 km) east of Pendleton on the Umatilla Indian Reservation. As of the 2020 census, Cayuse had a population of 66. It is part of the Pendleton–Hermiston Micropolitan Statistical Area.

Served by a railroad station and post office, the area was named for the Cayuse people. The post office was established in 1867 and discontinued in 2002.

== Geography ==
According to the United States Census Bureau, the CDP has a total area of 2.9 square miles (7.5 km^{2}), all land.

== Demographics ==
Historical population
Census	Pop.	Note	%±
2020	66		—
U.S. Decennial Census

As of the census of 2000, there were 59 people, 22 households, and 17 families residing in the CDP. The population density was 20.5 people per square mile (7.9/km^{2}). There were 22 housing units at an average density of 7.6 per square mile (2.9/km^{2}). The racial makeup of the CDP was 42.37% White, 1.69% African American, 49.15% Native American, 3.39% from other races, and 3.39% from two or more races. Hispanic or Latino of any race were 5.08% of the population.

There were 22 households, out of which 36.4% had children under the age of 18 living with them, 54.5% were married couples living together, 18.2% had a female householder with no husband present, and 18.2% were non-families. 13.6% of all households were made up of individuals, and 13.6% had someone living alone who was 65 years of age or older. The average household size was 2.68 and the average family size was 3.00.

In the CDP, the population was spread out, with 28.8% under the age of 18, 3.4% from 18 to 24, 25.4% from 25 to 44, 25.4% from 45 to 64, and 16.9% who were 65 years of age or older. The median age was 38 years. For every 100 females, there were 126.9 males. For every 100 females age 18 and over, there were 121.1 males.

The median income for a household in the CDP was $34,583, and the median income for a family was $38,500. Males had a median income of $23,333 versus $28,750 for females. The per capita income for the CDP was $13,311. There were 11.1% of families and 8.1% of the population living below the poverty line, including no under eighteens and 20.0% of those over 64.

== Education ==
The CDP is served by Pendleton School District.
