= Pine Hollow, Oregon =

Unincorporated community in the state of Oregon, United States

- Census-designated place (CDP)
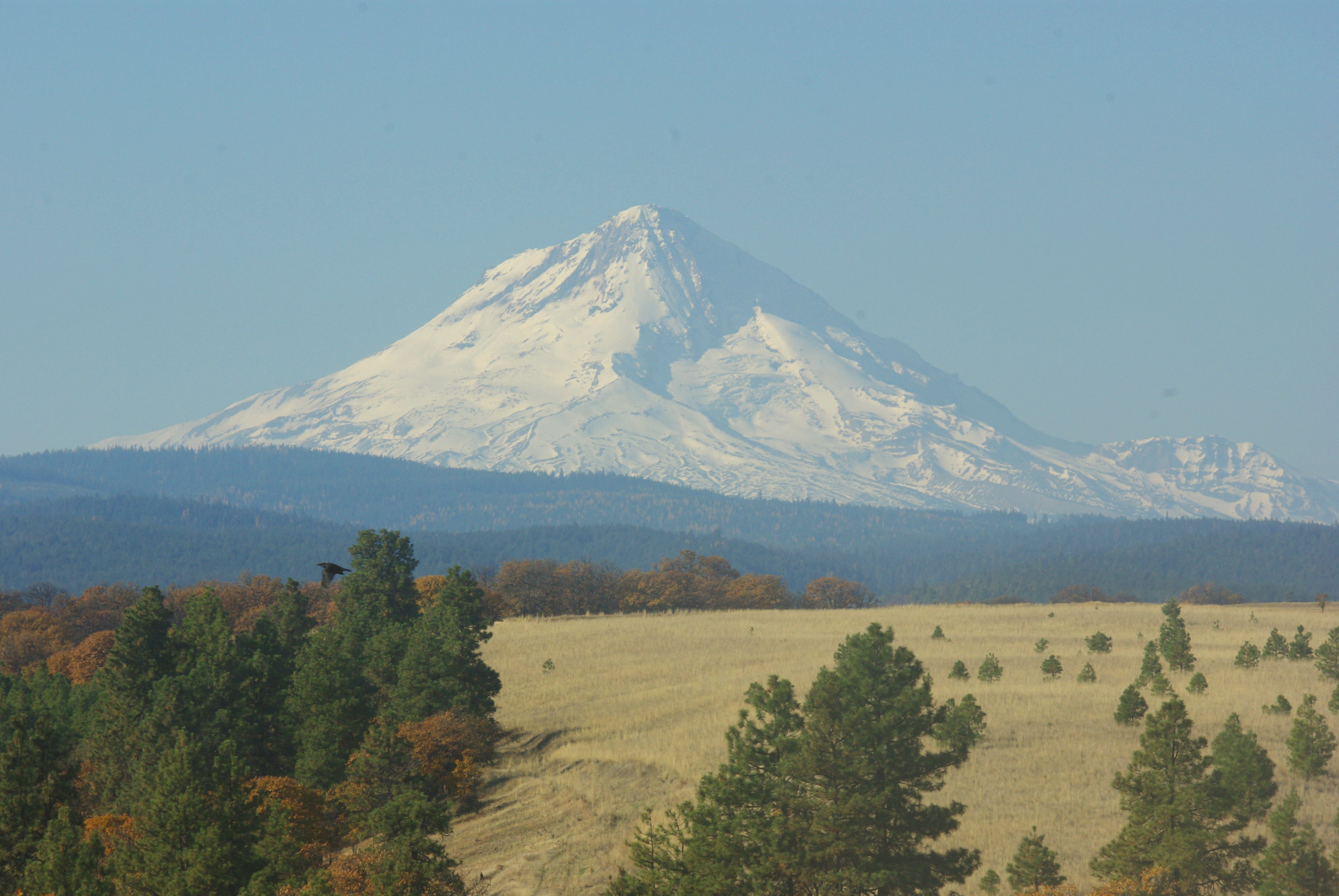
- Mount Hood as seen from Pleasant Ridge above Pine Hollow

- Location of Pine Hollow, Oregon
- Coordinates: 45°14′42″N 121°17′42″W
- Country: United States
- State: Oregon
- County: Wasco

Area
  - Total: 2.58 sq mi (6.67 km^{2})
  - Land: 2.22 sq mi (5.75 km^{2})
  - Water: 0.36 sq mi (0.92 km^{2})
- Elevation: 1,857 ft (566 m)

Population (2020)
  - Total: 531
  - Density: 239.1/sq mi (92.31/km^{2})
- Time zone: UTC-8 (Pacific (PST))
  - Summer (DST): UTC-7 (PDT)
- ZIP code: 97063
- Area codes: 458 and 541
- FIPS code: 41-57875
- GNIS feature ID: 2409068

Pine Hollow is a census-designated place (CDP) and unincorporated community in Wasco County, Oregon, United States. It surrounds Pine Hollow Reservoir. As of the 2020 census, Pine Hollow had a population of 531.

== Geography ==
According to the United States Census Bureau, the CDP has a total area of 2.6 square miles (6.7 km^{2}), of which, 2.3 square miles (6.0 km^{2}) of it is land and 0.3 square miles (0.78 km^{2}) of it (11.97%) is water.

== Demographics ==
Historical population
Census	Pop.	Note	%±
2020	531		—
U.S. Decennial Census

As of the census of 2000, there were 424 people, 197 households, and 152 families residing in the CDP. The population density was 186.0 inhabitants per square mile (71.8/km^{2}). There were 435 housing units at an average density of 190.8 per square mile (73.7/km^{2}). The racial makeup of the CDP was 94.10% White, 0.94% Native American, 1.18% Pacific Islander, 1.42% from other races, and 2.36% from two or more races. Hispanic or Latino of any race were 2.83% of the population.

There were 197 households, out of which 10.7% had children under the age of 18 living with them, 72.6% were married couples living together, 3.0% had a female householder with no husband present, and 22.8% were non-families. 19.3% of all households were made up of individuals, and 8.6% had someone living alone who was 65 years of age or older. The average household size was 2.15 and the average family size was 2.41.

In the CDP, the population was spread out, with 13.2% under the age of 18, 3.1% from 18 to 24, 9.7% from 25 to 44, 45.5% from 45 to 64, and 28.5% who were 65 years of age or older. The median age was 58 years. For every 100 females, there were 99.1 males. For every 100 females age 18 and over, there were 95.7 males.

The median income for a household in the CDP was $37,667, and the median income for a family was $37,604. Males had a median income of $37,083 versus $16,250 for females. The per capita income for the CDP was $16,537. About 9.1% of families and 10.5% of the population were below the poverty line, including 14.9% of those under age 18 and 7.0% of those age 65 or over.
