= Kirkpatrick, Oregon =

Unincorporated community in the state of Oregon, United States

- Census-designated place (CDP)
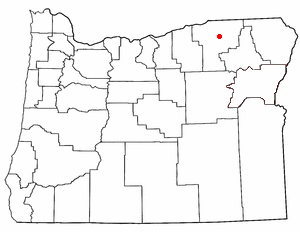
- Location of Kirkpatrick, Oregon
- Coordinates: 45°40′46″N 118°38′59″W
- Country: United States
- State: Oregon
- County: Umatilla

Area
  - Total: 3.58 sq mi (9.28 km^{2})
  - Land: 3.58 sq mi (9.28 km^{2})
  - Water: 0 sq mi (0.00 km^{2})
- Elevation: 1,303 ft (397 m)

Population (2020)
  - Total: 160
  - Density: 44.6/sq mi (17.23/km^{2})
- Time zone: UTC-8 (Pacific (PST))
  - Summer (DST): UTC-7 (PDT)
- FIPS code: 41-39566
- GNIS feature ID: 2408488

Kirkpatrick is a census-designated place (CDP) in Umatilla County, Oregon, United States. As of the 2020 census, Kirkpatrick had a population of 160. It is part of the Pendleton–Hermiston Micropolitan Statistical Area.

== Geography ==
According to the United States Census Bureau, the CDP has a total area of 3.6 square miles (9.3 km^{2}), all land.

== Demographics ==
Historical population
| Census | Pop. | Note | %± |
|---|---|---|---|
| 2020 | 160 | | — |
U.S. Decennial Census

As of the census of 2000, there were 172 people, 54 households, and 44 families residing in the CDP. The population density was 47.8 inhabitants per square mile (18.5/km^{2}). There were 57 housing units at an average density of 15.9/sq mi (6.1/km^{2}). The racial makeup of the CDP was 43.60% White, 54.07% Native American, and 2.33% from two or more races. Hispanic or Latino of any race were 0.58% of the population.

There were 54 households, out of which 25.9% had children under the age of 18 living with them, 50.0% were married couples living together, 24.1% had a female householder with no husband present, and 18.5% were non-families. 13.0% of all households were made up of individuals, and 5.6% had someone living alone who was 65 years of age or older. The average household size was 3.19 and the average family size was 3.25.

In the CDP, the population was spread out, with 30.2% under the age of 18, 8.7% from 18 to 24, 24.4% from 25 to 44, 25.0% from 45 to 64, and 11.6% who were 65 years of age or older. The median age was 38 years. For every 100 females, there were 97.7 males. For every 100 females age 18 and over, there were 87.5 males.

The median income for a household in the CDP was $30,179, and the median income for a family was $30,893. Males had a median income of $27,188 versus $24,000 for females. The per capita income for the CDP was $11,884. About 27.9% of families and 34.5% of the population were below the poverty line, including 46.0% of those under the age of eighteen and 19.0% of those 65 or over.
