= Gopher Flats, Oregon =

- CDP
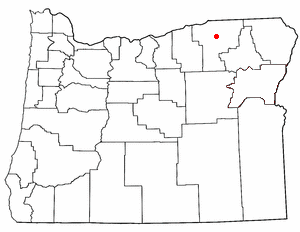
- Location of Gopher Flats, Oregon
- Coordinates: 45°39′57″N 118°43′21″W
- Country: United States
- State: Oregon
- County: Umatilla

Area
  - Total: 2.10 sq mi (5.45 km^{2})
  - Land: 2.10 sq mi (5.45 km^{2})
  - Water: 0 sq mi (0.00 km^{2})
- Elevation: 1,217 ft (371 m)

Population (2020)
  - Total: 329
  - Density: 156.3/sq mi (60.33/km^{2})
- Time zone: UTC-8 (Pacific (PST))
  - Summer (DST): UTC-7 (PDT)
- ZIP code: 97801
- Area codes: 458 and 541
- FIPS code: 41-30165
- GNIS feature ID: 2408309

Gopher Flats is a census-designated place (CDP) in Umatilla County, Oregon, United States. As of the 2020 census, Gopher Flats had a population of 329. It is part of the Pendleton–Hermiston Micropolitan Statistical Area.

== Geography ==
According to the United States Census Bureau, the CDP has a total area of 2.2 square miles (5.7 km^{2}), all land.

== Demographics ==
Historical population
Census	Pop.	Note	%±
2020	329		—
U.S. Decennial Census

As of the census of 2000, there were 401 people, 157 households, and 108 families residing in the CDP. The population density was 186.9 inhabitants per square mile (72.2/km^{2}). There were 166 housing units at an average density of 77.4 per square mile (29.9/km^{2}). The racial makeup of the CDP was 73.57% White, 0.50% African American, 23.19% Native American, 0.50% Asian, 0.25% Pacific Islander, and 2.00% from two or more races. Hispanic or Latino of any race were 0.25% of the population.

There were 157 households, out of which 31.8% had children under the age of 18 living with them, 49.7% were married couples living together, 12.1% had a female householder with no husband present, and 30.6% were non-families. 20.4% of all households were made up of individuals, and 8.9% had someone living alone who was 65 years of age or older. The average household size was 2.55 and the average family size was 2.87.

In the CDP, the population was spread out, with 24.7% under the age of 18, 8.7% from 18 to 24, 24.4% from 25 to 44, 30.2% from 45 to 64, and 12.0% who were 65 years of age or older. The median age was 40 years. For every 100 females, there were 101.5 males. For every 100 females age 18 and over, there were 98.7 males.

The median income for a household in the CDP was $39,432, and the median income for a family was $44,792. Males had a median income of $35,625 versus $20,000 for females. The per capita income for the CDP was $17,628. About 4.4% of families and 7.4% of the population were below the poverty line, including 7.5% of those under age 18 and 4.2% of those age 65 or over.
