= Riverside, Umatilla County, Oregon =

Riverside
- CDP
- Location within the state of Oregon
- Coordinates: 45°40′37″N 118°44′13″W
- Country: United States
- State: Oregon
- County: Umatilla

Area
  - Total: 0.62 sq mi (1.6 km^{2})
  - Land: 0.62 sq mi (1.6 km^{2})
- Elevation: 1,293 ft (394 m)

Population (2000)
  - Total: 189
  - Density: 310/sq mi (120/km^{2})
- Time zone: UTC-8 (Pacific (PST))
  - Summer (DST): UTC-7 (PDT)
- ZIP code: 97801
- Area codes: 458 and 541
- GNIS feature ID: 2409188

Riverside is a census-designated place (CDP) in Umatilla County, Oregon, United States. The population was 189 at the 2000 census. It is part of the Pendleton–Hermiston Micropolitan Statistical Area.

== Geography ==
According to the United States Census Bureau, the CDP has a total area of 0.6 square miles (1.6 km^{2}), all land.

== Demographics ==
As of the census of 2000, there were 189 people, 78 households, and 56 families residing in the CDP. The population density was 317.1 inhabitants per square mile (122.4/km^{2}). There were 82 housing units at an average density of 137.6 per square mile (53.1/km^{2}). The racial makeup of the CDP was 87.83% White, 7.94% Native American, 1.59% Asian, 0.53% from other races, and 2.12% from two or more races. Hispanic or Latino of any race were 2.12% of the population.

There were 78 households, out of which 23.1% had children under the age of 18 living with them, 60.3% were married couples living together, 9.0% had a female householder with no husband present, and 28.2% were non-families. 26.9% of all households were made up of individuals, and 11.5% had someone living alone who was 65 years of age or older. The average household size was 2.42 and the average family size was 2.95.

In the CDP, the population was spread out, with 22.2% under the age of 18, 5.8% from 18 to 24, 28.0% from 25 to 44, 28.0% from 45 to 64, and 15.9% who were 65 years of age or older. The median age was 43 years. For every 100 females, there were 98.9 males. For every 100 females age 18 and over, there were 88.5 males.

The median income for a household in the CDP was $40,313, and the median income for a family was $41,250. Males had a median income of $27,500 versus $25,893 for females. The per capita income for the CDP was $16,954. About 4.7% of families and 3.9% of the population were below the poverty line, including none of those under the age of eighteen and 11.1% of those 65 or over.
