= Tutuilla, Oregon =

Unincorporated community in the state of Oregon, United States

- Census-designated place (CDP)
- Location of Tutuilla, Oregon
- Coordinates: 45°37′32″N 118°42′30″W
- Country: United States
- State: Oregon
- County: Umatilla

Area
  - Total: 20.00 sq mi (51.79 km^{2})
  - Land: 20.00 sq mi (51.79 km^{2})
  - Water: 0 sq mi (0.00 km^{2})
- Elevation: 1,457 ft (444 m)

Population (2020)
  - Total: 448
  - Density: 22.4/sq mi (8.65/km^{2})
- Time zone: UTC-8 (Pacific (PST))
  - Summer (DST): UTC-7 (PDT)
- ZIP code: 97801
- Area codes: 458 and 541
- FIPS code: 41-75185
- GNIS feature ID: 2409368

Tutuilla is a census-designated place (CDP) in Umatilla County, Oregon, United States. As of the 2020 census, Tutuilla had a population of 448. It is part of the Pendleton–Hermiston Micropolitan Statistical Area.

== Geography ==
According to the United States Census Bureau, the CDP has a total area of 20.0 square miles (51.8 km^{2}), all land. The area is 1,427 feet (435 m) above sea-level.

== Demographics ==
Historical population
Census	Pop.	Note	%±
2020	448		—
U.S. Decennial Census

As of the census of 2000, there were 460 people, 157 households, and 130 families residing in the CDP. The population density was 23.0 people per square mile (8.9/km^{2}). There were 160 housing units at an average density of 8.0/sq mi (3.1/km^{2}). The racial makeup of the CDP was 62.83% White, 0.22% African American, 30.43% Native American, 0.22% Asian, 1.96% from other races, and 4.35% from two or more races. Hispanic or Latino of any race were 1.96% of the population.

There were 157 households, out of which 36.3% had children under the age of 18 living with them, 70.1% were married couples living together, 10.2% had a female householder with no husband present, and 16.6% were non-families. 12.7% of all households were made up of individuals, and 4.5% had someone living alone who was 65 years of age or older. The average household size was 2.90 and the average family size was 3.13.

In the CDP, the population was spread out, with 28.3% under the age of 18, 5.0% from 18 to 24, 27.8% from 25 to 44, 27.4% from 45 to 64, and 11.5% who were 65 years of age or older. The median age was 37 years. For every 100 females, there were 99.1 males. For every 100 females age 18 and over, there were 95.3 males.

The median income for a household in the CDP was $47,679, and the median income for a family was $50,750. Males had a median income of $37,143 versus $28,500 for females. The per capita income for the CDP was $18,826. About 10.2% of families and 11.0% of the population were below the poverty line, including 14.1% of those under age 18 and 8.5% of those age 65 or over.
