= Crooked Creek (Wenaha River tributary) =

Creek in Oregon and Washington state

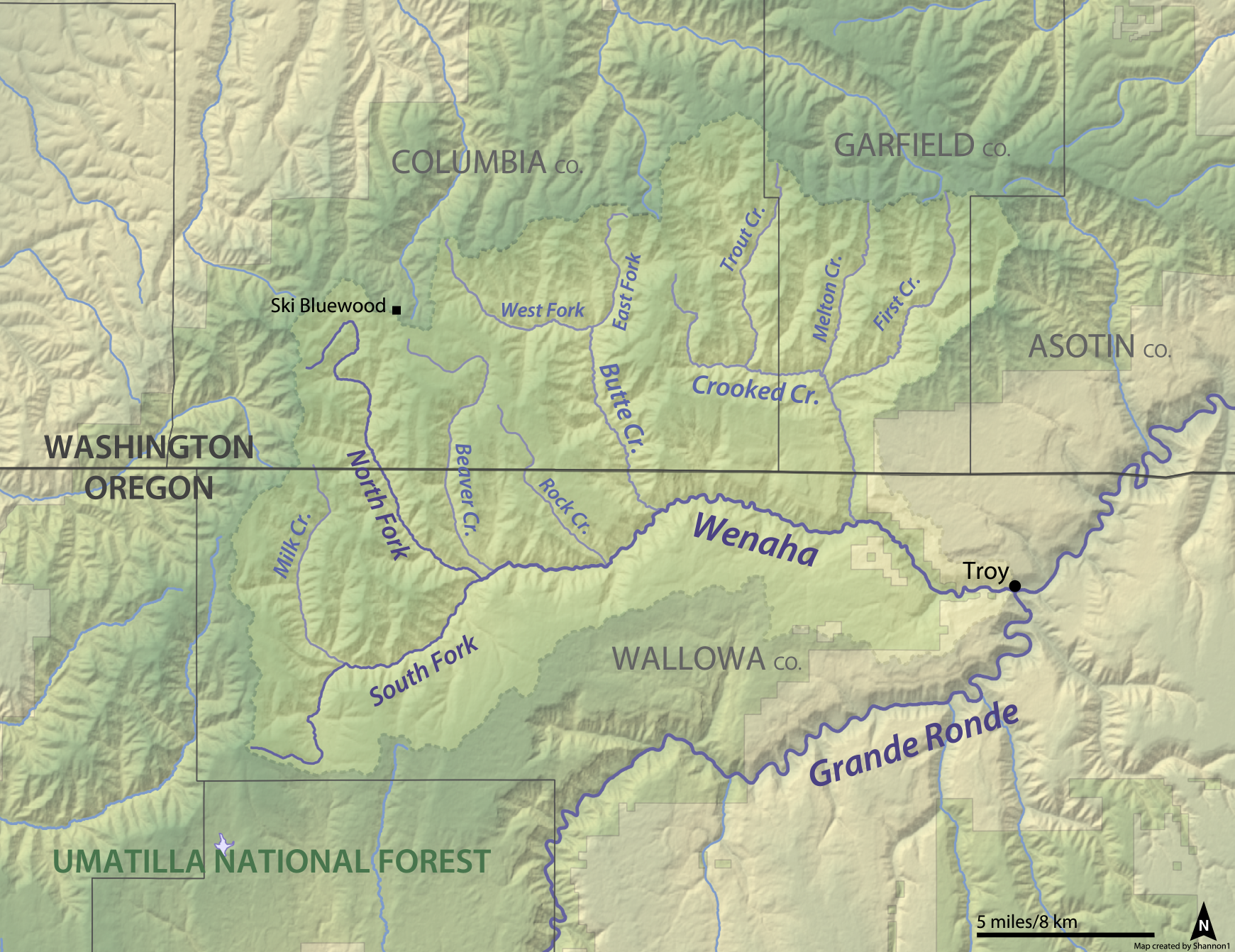
- Map of the Wenaha river watershed, including Crooked Creek

- Location of the mouth of Crooked Creek in Oregon

Location
- Country: United States
- State: Washington, Oregon

Physical characteristics
- Source: Blue Mountains
  - location: Columbia County, Washington
  - coordinates: 46°05′16″N 117°40′09″W
  - elevation: 5,240 ft (1,600 m)
- Mouth: Wenaha River
  - location: Wallowa County, Oregon
  - coordinates: 45°58′37″N 117°33′11″W
  - elevation: 1,906 ft (581 m)
- Length: 13.4 mi (21.6 km)

Crooked Creek is a 13.4-mile (21.6 km) tributary of the Wenaha River, flowing through southeast Washington and northeast Oregon in the United States. Beginning at McBain Spring in the Blue Mountains of Columbia County, Washington, it flows south then turns east, entering Garfield County. It then turns south again, entering Wallowa County, Oregon, and joins the Wenaha River about 5 miles (8.0 km) upstream of Troy.

The creek and its tributaries form a network of canyons cut into the horizontal basalt layers of the Blue Mountains. The entirety of the creek flows within the Wenaha-Tucannon Wilderness of the Umatilla National Forest. Its major tributaries, listed from upstream to downstream, are Third, Second, Cherry, Melton and First Creeks, all joining from the left. The 19-mile (31 km) Crooked Creek Trail begins at the crest of the Blue Mountains at Indian Corral, and descends to the Wenaha River via Trout, Third and Crooked Creeks. Much of the area was burned during the 2015 Grizzly Bear Complex fire.

It was historically called the "Crooked Fork" of the Wenaha River.

== See also ==
- List of rivers of Oregon
- List of rivers of Washington (state)
