= South Fork Wenaha River =

- Location of the mouth of the South Fork Wenaha River in Oregon
- Etymology: Perhaps from a Cayuse language placename

Location
- Country: United States
- State: Oregon
- County: Wallowa

Physical characteristics
- Source: Blue Mountains
  - location: near Bone Spring, Wenaha–Tucannon Wilderness
  - coordinates: 45°52′32″N 117°56′17″W
  - elevation: 5,723 ft (1,744 m)
- Mouth: Wenaha River
  - location: Wenaha Forks
  - coordinates: 45°57′03″N 117°47′39″W
  - elevation: 2,805 ft (855 m)

The South Fork Wenaha River is a tributary of the Wenaha River in the U.S. state of Oregon. The river begins in the Blue Mountains south of Bone Spring in Wallowa County near its border with Union County. From there it flows generally northeast through the Wenaha–Tucannon Wilderness of the Umatilla National Forest to meet the North Fork Wenaha River. The combined forks form the main stem of Wenaha, a tributary of the Grande Ronde River.

Named tributaries of the South Fork Wenaha from source to mouth are Milk and Trapper creeks followed by Cougar Canyon. Then come Jaussard and Elk creeks.

== Recreation ==
The main path along the South Fork is the Wenaha River Trail, a 31-mile (50 km) route with trailheads at Troy and Timothy Springs. It runs parallel to the main stem between Troy and Wenaha Forks and roughly parallel to the South Fork upstream of the confluence. This trail connects to other wilderness paths: Elk Flat, Hoodoo, and Cross Canyon trails.

The trail system is used by hikers, backpackers, and horse riders. It offers panoramic views, access to fishing, and suitable spots for dispersed camping. It is also remote, involves significant elevation changes, can be extremely hot in summer, and is frequented by rattlesnakes.

== See also ==
- List of rivers of Oregon
