= Wenaha River =

River in Oregon, U.S.

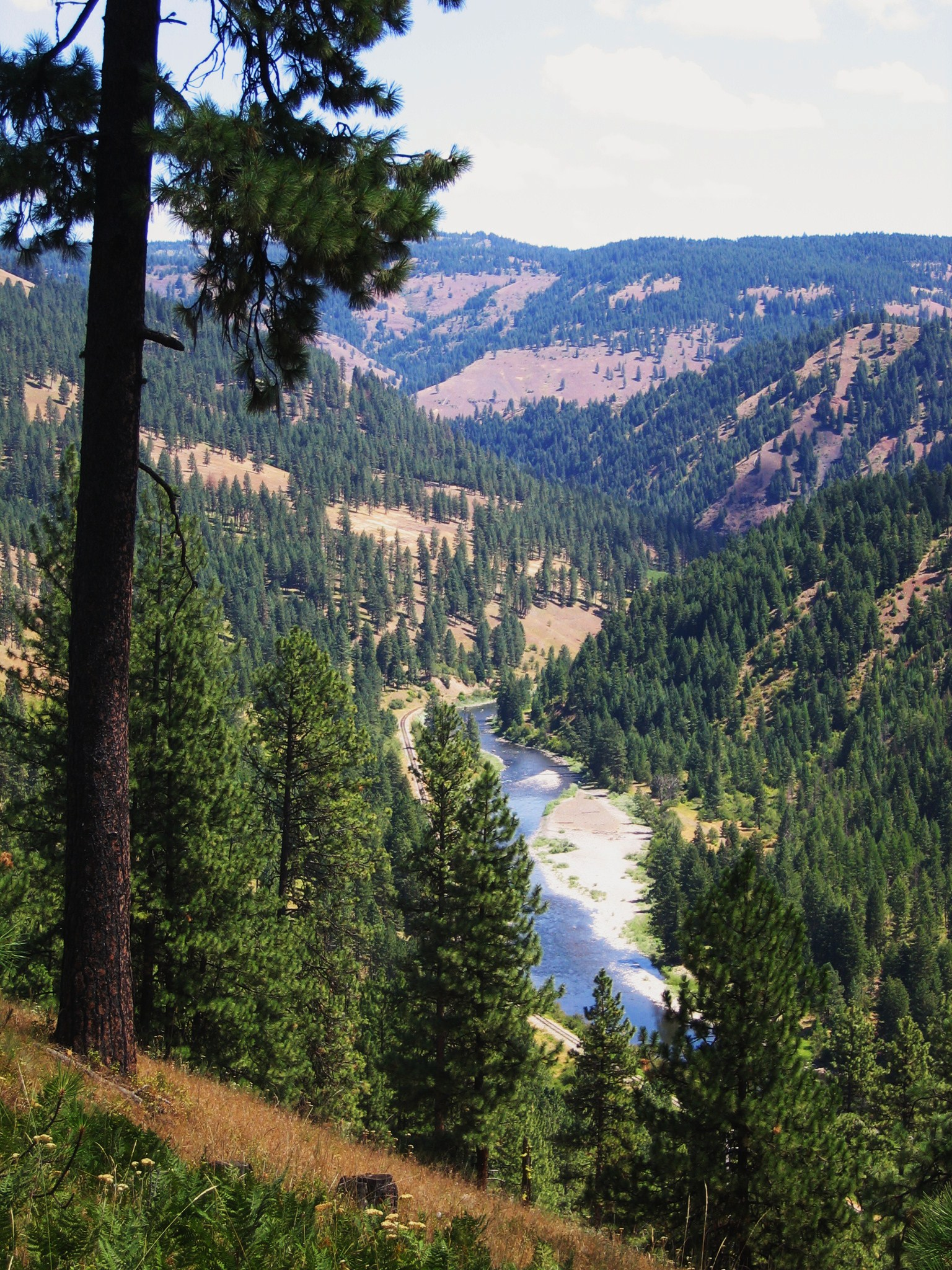
- Wenaha River

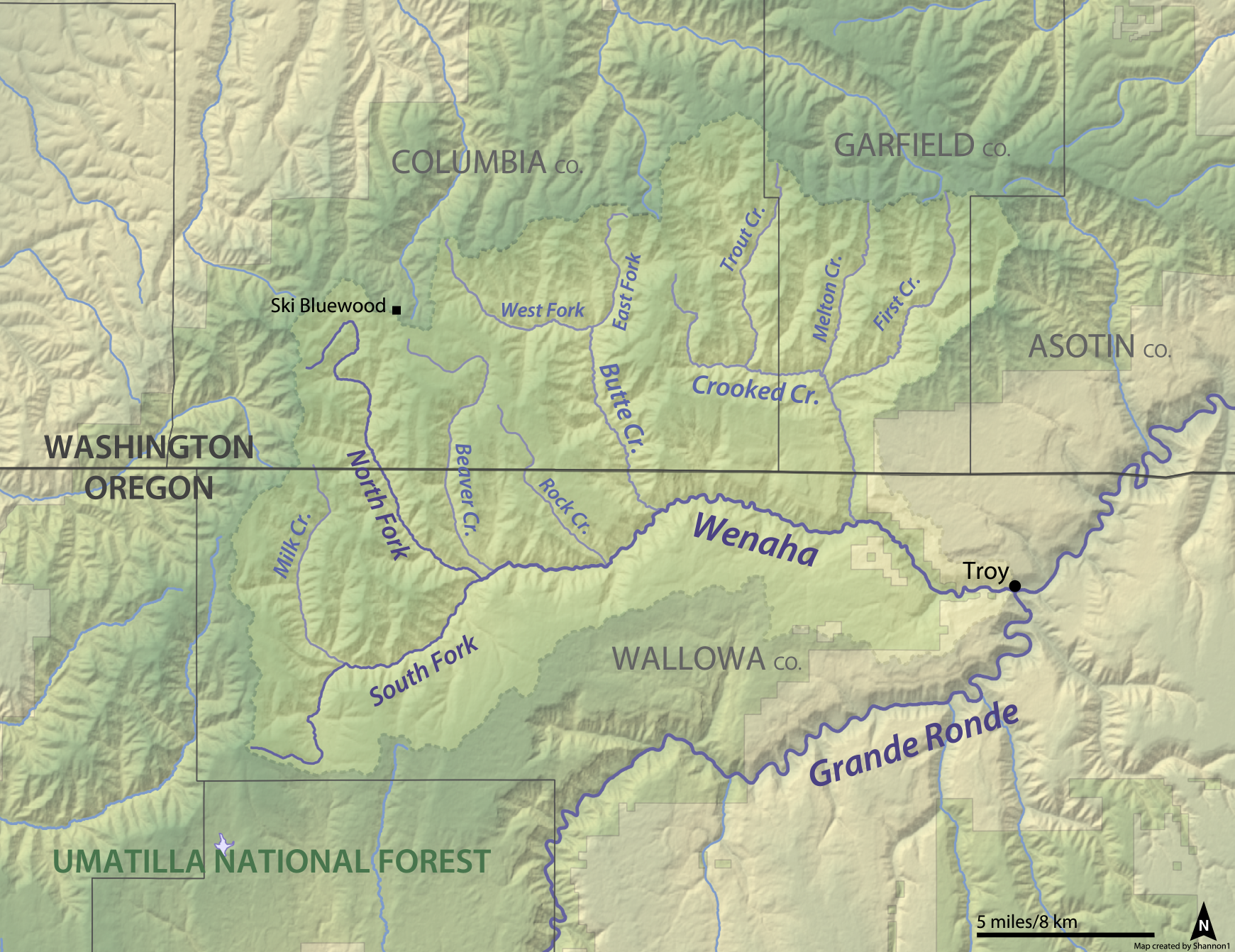
- Map of the Wenaha River drainage basin

- Location of the mouth of the Wenaha River in Oregon
- Etymology: Named for the Wenak band of Nez Perce

Location
- Country: United States
- State: Oregon
- County: Wallowa

Physical characteristics
- Source: Wenaha Forks
  - location: Wenaha–Tucannon Wilderness, Blue Mountains
  - coordinates: 45°57′03″N 117°47′39″W
  - elevation: 2,809 ft (856 m)
- Mouth: Grande Ronde River
  - location: Troy
  - coordinates: 45°56′44″N 117°27′07″W
  - elevation: 1,601 ft (488 m)
- Length: 21.6 mi (34.8 km)
- Basin size: 296 sq mi (770 km^{2})
- Discharge
  - average: 390 cu ft/s (11 m^{3}/s)

National Wild and Scenic River
- Type: Wild, Scenic, Recreational
- Designated: October 28, 1988

The Wenaha River is a tributary of the Grande Ronde River, about 21.6 miles (34.8 km) long, in Wallowa County, northeastern Oregon. The river begins at the confluence of its north and south forks in the Blue Mountains and flows east through the Wenaha–Tucannon Wilderness to meet the larger river at the small settlement of Troy.

The Wenaha and its tributaries form an extensive network of steep canyons sliced into volcanic rock layers of the Columbia River basalts, which covered the region during massive eruptions millions of years ago. A designated Wild and Scenic River for its entire length, the Wenaha basin is one of only a few Oregon watersheds with no dams or diversions. The river basin is mostly roadless, and is considered one of the most intact big game habitats in Oregon. Elk hunting, hiking, horseback riding, and salmon and trout fishing are popular recreational activities along the river.

Once used by four Native American tribes for hunting, fishing and trade, the Wenaha River basin was surrendered by the Nez Perce to the US government in the 1860s. The few settlers that subsequently came to this rugged, inaccessible region used it primarily for livestock grazing, causing severe damage to the local grasslands and soils. Most of the Wenaha River basin has been managed by the U.S. Forest Service since 1905 as part of the Wenaha, now the Umatilla National Forest, and as a wilderness area since 1978.

== Course ==
The main stem of the Wenaha River begins at an elevation of 2,809 feet (856 m) in western Wallowa County, at the confluence of its north and south forks at Wenaha Forks. The 13.8-mile (22.2 km) long North Fork Wenaha River originates near Ski Bluewood to the east of Deadman Peak in Columbia County, Washington, at an elevation of 5,885 feet (1,794 m), (Note: Elevation derived from Google Earth using GNIS source coordinates.) and flows south into Oregon. The 12.2-mile (19.6 km) long South Fork Wenaha River begins in the southwest corner of Wallowa County, at an elevation of 5,723 feet (1,744 m), (Note: Elevation derived from Google Earth using GNIS source coordinates.) and flows northeast to the confluence.

From the forks, the Wenaha River flows east, cutting a deep canyon through rugged plateau country on the eastern flank of the northern Blue Mountains. Atop the steep basalt canyon walls – locally known as "breaks" – sit rolling forested uplands, including Grouse Flat and Moore Flat to the north of the river and Hoodoo and Eden Ridges south of it. It leaves the national forest and empties into the Grande Ronde River at the town of Troy, at an elevation of 1,601 feet (488 m). The Grande Ronde is a tributary of the Snake River, in turn the largest tributary of the Columbia River.

Tributaries enter the river in the following order headed downstream: Beaver Creek, Slick Ear Creek, and Rock Creek, all from the left; Big Hole Canyon from the right; Butte Creek, left; Swamp Creek, right; Weller Creek, left; Cross Canyon, right; Fairview Creek, left; Burnt Canyon, right; Crooked Creek, left. The largest tributaries are Butte Creek, which originates in Columbia County near the headwaters of the North Fork, and Crooked Creek, which drains parts of Columbia, Garfield and Asotin counties in Washington. Both form extensive canyon systems of their own, and flow south to join the Wenaha River shortly after entering Oregon.

== Watershed ==
The Wenaha River watershed comprises 296 square miles (770 km^{2}), of which 137 square miles (350 km^{2}) are in Oregon. After the Wallowa River, it is the second largest tributary of the Grande Ronde by volume of discharge. In terms of land area, the Wenaha sub-basin is just over 7 percent of the entire Grande Ronde watershed. The highest point in the watershed is Oregon Butte, at 6,401 feet (1,951 m) above sea level. It is bordered by the watersheds of the Walla Walla River to the west, the Touchet and Tucannon Rivers to the north, and smaller tributaries of the Grande Ronde to the south and east.

The area experiences cold, snowy winters between November and April with snowpack building as much as 5 feet (1.5 m) deep at higher elevations. Summers are very hot and dry, especially along the river bottoms. Annual precipitation ranges from 14 to 32 inches (360 to 810 mm) in the lower southeastern part of the basin, to 52 to 70 inches (1,300 to 1,800 mm) along the highest elevations to the west. There is no stream gaging station on the Wenaha, but Palmer's Field Guide to Oregon Rivers (2014) estimates the average discharge of the river at 390 cu ft/s (11 m^{3}/s). Seasonal variations range from over 2,000 cu ft/s (57 m^{3}/s) during spring snowmelt to about 100 cu ft/s (2.8 m^{3}/s) in late summer and fall.

== Ecology and environment ==
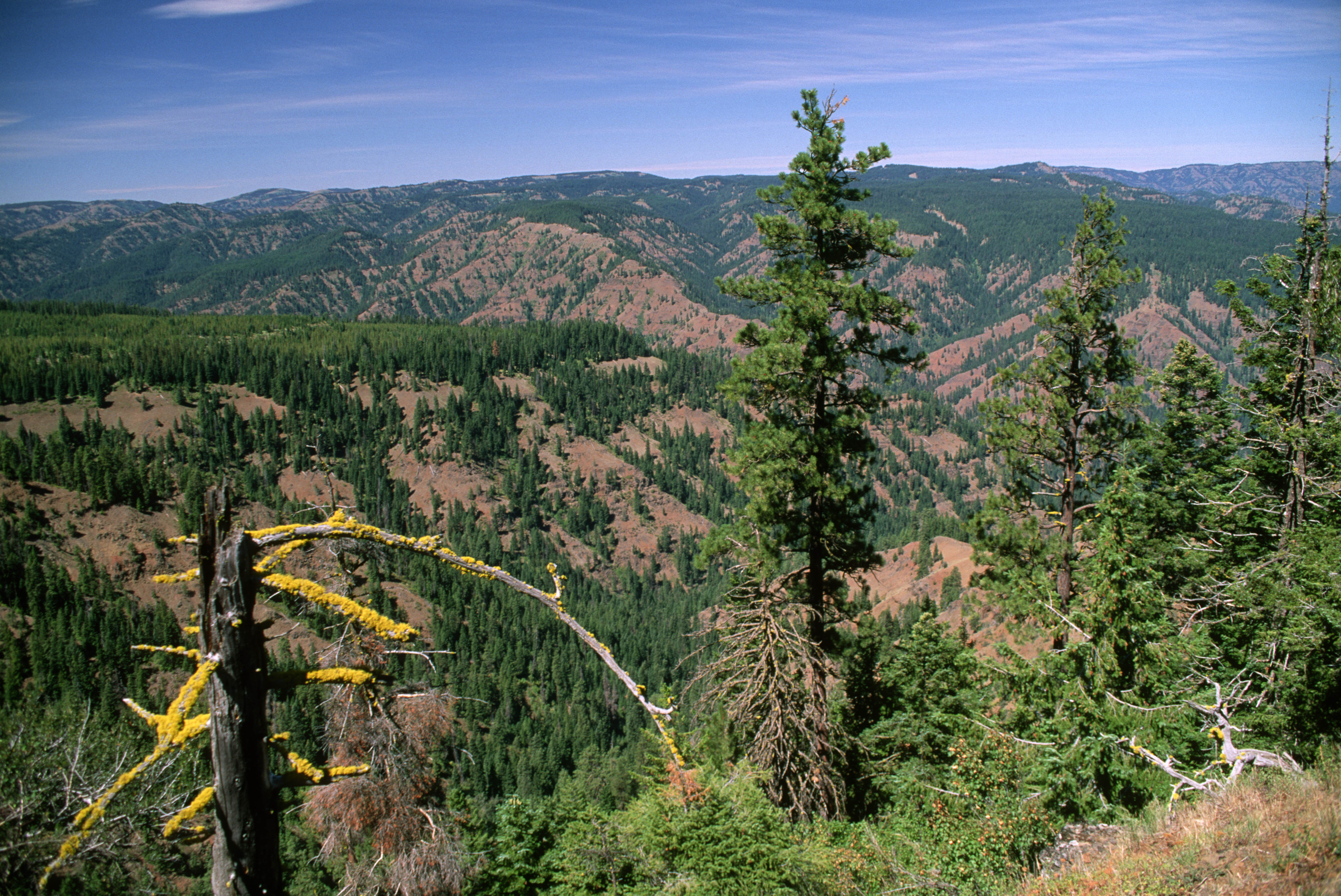
Forested uplands and basalt breaks characterize the Wenaha-Tucannon Wilderness

The Wenaha River basin is characterized by coniferous forest, with ponderosa pine at lower elevations and lodgepole pine mixed with western larch, fir and spruce above about 4,500 feet (1,400 m). Subalpine fir is common at high elevations. The basin provides habitat for numerous animal species include Rocky Mountain elk, white-tailed deer, moose, black bear, gray wolf, coyote, cougar, bobcat, snowshoe hare, and bighorn sheep. Bird species include blue grouse, ruffed grouse, chukar, valley quail, mountain quail, Lewis's woodpecker, bald eagle, golden eagle, and peregrine falcon.

The basin is largely undisturbed by roads and development, and thus provides excellent wildlife habitat. The area supports one of the highest densities of elk population in the continental United States. Explorers' and pioneers' accounts starting in the 1860s noted that the elk population was rich to the south of the Wenaha River and across most of what is now the Wallowa-Whitman National Forest. There was no mention of elk inhabiting areas north of the river. Unrestricted hunting caused the population of elk and other big game to plummet until about 1900–1905. In 1913 elk from Montana were stocked in areas north of the river. By the 1930s, a combination of stocking, hunting restrictions, and natural migration of elk populations from south of the river greatly increased the northern elk population.

Wolves were nearly extirpated in the Blue Mountains in the 20th century due to hunting, but have since been repopulating the region. The Wenaha wolf pack was first confirmed in 2008 and has produced young in almost every year since then. As of 2022 it had grown to eight adults. The Wenaha pack's range extends over a large area of Wallowa County, primarily south of the Wenaha River. The Grouse Flats wolf pack, which had about nine adults in 2022, has been observed primarily on the north side of the Wenaha River with most of its range in Washington. The Grouse Flats pack has been implicated in a number of livestock killings and the Washington Department of Fish and Wildlife authorized lethal removal of some wolves in 2019.

The Wenaha River is considered a Type IV channel under the Rosgen Stream Classification, characterized by a shallow rocky bed interspersed with deep pools. Although the river flows through a rugged, mountainous region, its gradient is relatively low at 1.1 percent, and is bordered by floodplains with dense riparian hardwood forests along its valley floor. These characteristics contrast with the nearby Grande Ronde and Snake Rivers, which have steeper gradients and less floodplain area. There are no dams or channel modifications on the Wenaha River and its tributaries; although there are a few water rights within the basin used for domestic and livestock water supply, they account for a tiny portion of the river's flow. The river is considered a critical habitat for spring chinook salmon, steelhead trout and bull trout (formerly considered the same as Dolly Varden trout). The Forest Service reported in 2000 that "the Wenaha River system may be one of the best bull trout populations remaining in Oregon." Other fish species include rainbow trout, redband trout, and mountain whitefish.

As late as the 1960s, the Wenaha River saw an average of 22,000 anadromous fish returns (salmon and steelhead) each year. The primary spawning grounds are along the main stem and South Fork, with more sparse habitat in the North Fork and Butte Creek. Although habitat along the river has remained largely undisturbed, the construction of dams on the lower Snake River greatly reduced the number of migratory fish reaching the Wenaha. From 1979 to 1984, an average of less than 100 chinook salmon returned to the river each year. Populations have remained low and unstable since then; the average chinook salmon return for the period 1995–2005 was 376 fish, not counting those of hatchery stock. Coho salmon and fall Chinook, which used to come up to the Wenaha before the dams were built, are no longer found in the river.

== Geology ==
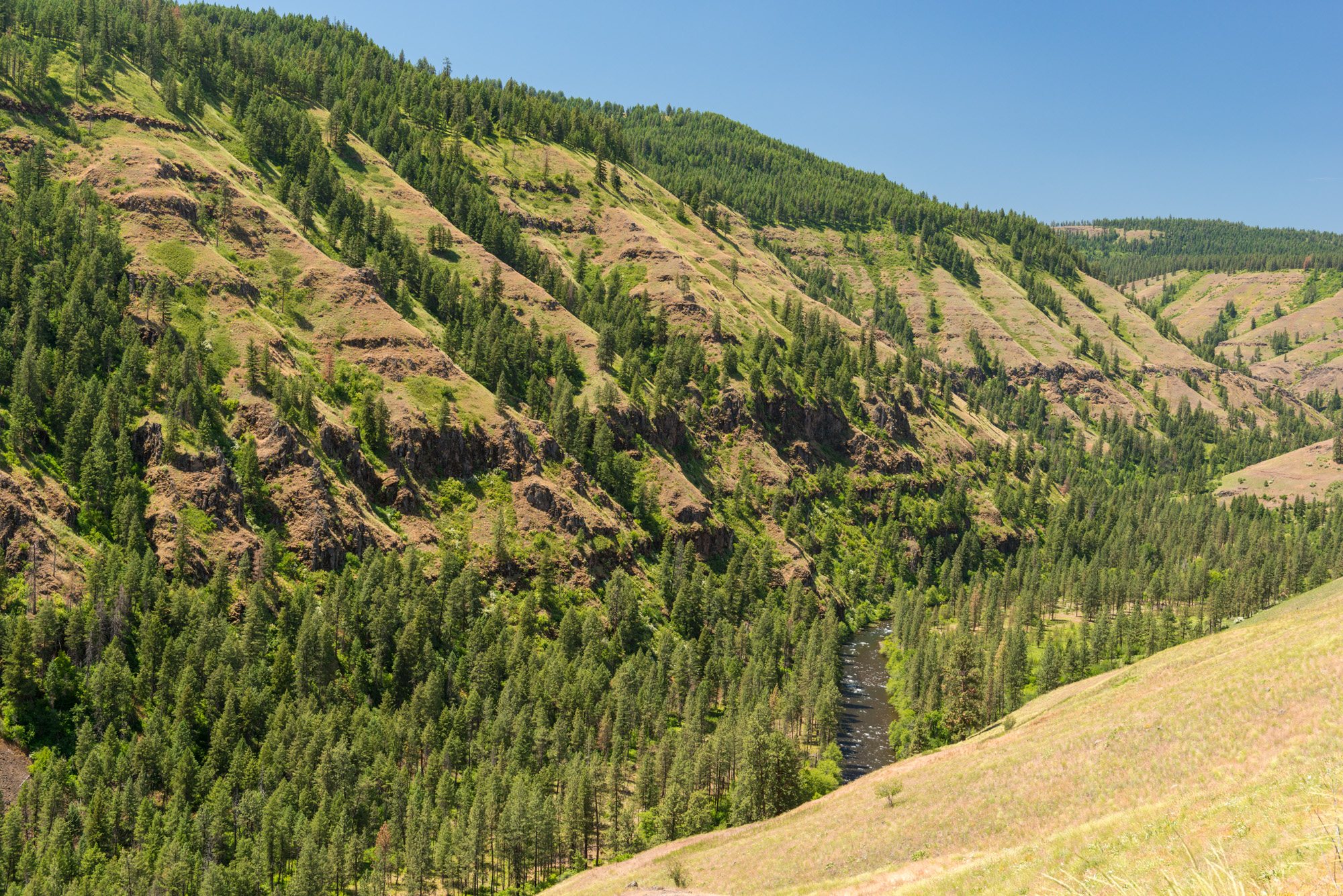
Horizontal basalt layers are clearly visible in the Wenaha River canyon near Troy

The surface geology of the Wenaha River basin is defined by massive basalt lava flows making up the Columbia River Basalt Group, whose rocks now cover much of the Columbia Plateau region of the Pacific Northwest. The oldest of these basalt flows are the Grande Ronde basalt, which erupted about 17–15.5 million years ago and reach a thickness of more than 4,000 feet (1,200 m) in parts of the Wenaha-Tucannon Wilderness. Above this is the Wanapum basalt, which erupted some 15.5–13.7 million years ago and reaches a thickness of 400 to 500 feet (120 to 150 m). The youngest are the Saddle Mountains basalt, which erupted about 13.7–10 million years ago. The basalt layers are interbedded with sedimentary rocks representing deposits from periods of lesser volcanic activity, and pumice deposits and magmatic dikes indicate the sites of past eruptions. In the northern areas of the present day wilderness area some pre-eruption terrain, primarily metamorphic rock of late Paleozoic to early Mesozoic age, remains exposed.

Prior to the Blue Mountains uplift starting about 15 million years ago, the area around the Wenaha and lower Grande Ronde rivers probably drained west towards the Columbia River. As the mountains rose, a structural basin or depression (the "Troy basin") formed along the east side of the mountains. When the Saddle Mountains basalt erupted it spread northwest from the Troy basin over the Blue Mountains towards present-day Walla Walla and from there over vast areas of southern Washington. These flows blocked westward drainage from the Troy basin, and in their aftermath a landscape of lakes and peat bogs formed in the area, later to be buried by fluvial sandstones and siltstones. Fossil peat bogs eventually turned into lignite deposits in the Troy basin. Between 10–6 million years ago, drainage established a new eastern outlet towards the Snake River. The modern Wenaha and Grande Ronde channels began to take shape and cut down into the basalt layers, eventually forming a massive system of canyons. The Wenaha River channel developed along the axis of the Grouse Flat syncline, a geologic fold that formed with the Blue Mountains uplift.

== History ==
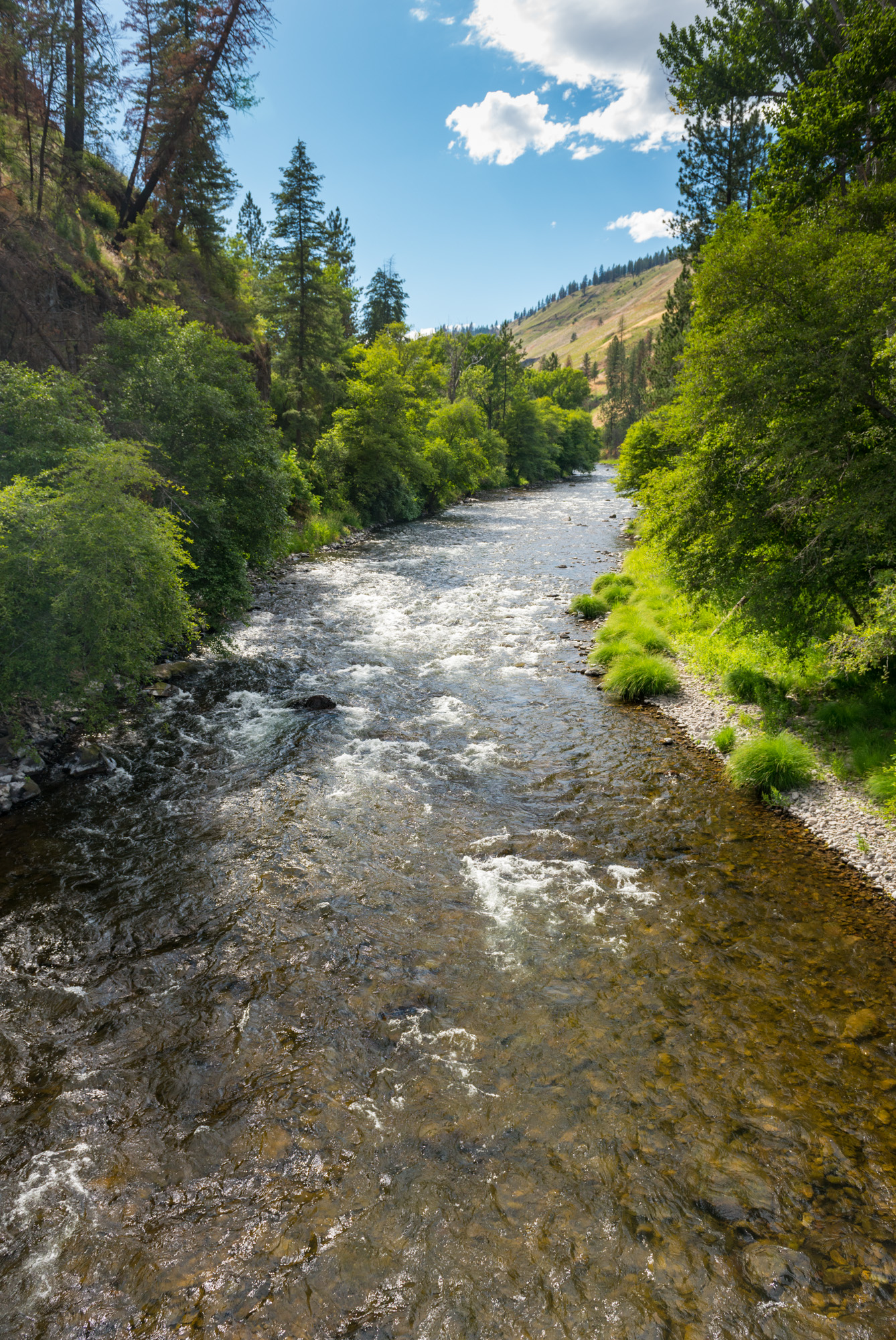
Wenaha River at Troy

The Wenaha River was used by the Nez Perce, Walla Walla, Cayuse and Umatilla peoples for thousands of years. Most of the lower mainstem of the river was Nez Perce territory. The name of the river comes from the Wenak band of Nez Perce, with the "ha" suffix indicating the land governed by the Wenak. The upper reaches of the river, including its north and south forks, were used seasonally by the Walla Walla and Cayuse for hunting and fishing, although they sometimes ranged further east, as far as the Minam River. Trails crisscrossed the Blue Mountains providing routes for seasonal migrations and trade. One such trail came south from the upper Tucannon River, following ridge tops south past Oregon Butte and Weller Butte, then down to the Wenaha River near its confluence with Butte Creek. From there it continued east along the Wenaha River to its confluence with the Grande Ronde, where people had forded the larger river since "time immemorial". Tucker (1940) describes the significance of a site along the trail:

"At the junction of the Butte Creek and Wenaha River is Grizzly Bear Rock and the totem pole on Sentinel Rock. Numerous legends attach themselves to the rock which possess an amazing likeness to a huge bear. Legend says Indians annually set up a village at that point while providing winter food. An evil spirit also lived there and would assume the form of a grizzly bear and then cause death and misery to the tribe. To frustrate such action, chiefs posted a sentinel to stand guard against the evil spirit, but one such sentinel slept one night and the evil spirit slipped through the picket lines to cause endless distress. Friendly gods eventually conquered the evil spirit while in bear form and converted it into basalt rock. There the big, bad bear stands today, a perpetual symbol of what happens to evil spirits masquerading as bears."

The first known Europeans to travel in this region were the expedition led by US Army officer Benjamin Bonneville in 1834. Leaving Idaho territory, they crossed the rugged country west of Hells Canyon and followed Joseph Canyon down to the Grande Ronde River, and on towards the Snake. They did not explore further up the Grande Ronde, and never saw the Wenaha. In 1836 Marcus Whitman and his family came west along the Oregon Trail and established a mission near what is now Walla Walla, Washington. This was the first passage of the trail made by a white family and proved that women and children could make the journey. In September 1843, Whitman led an expedition from nearby Fort Nez Percés and crossed the Blue Mountains to the southeast. On September 13, after traveling over 20 miles (32 km) across a dry, rugged landscape, they reached the upper Wenaha, likely becoming the first Europeans to see the river. They camped near the river's confluence with Butte Creek and the following day they traveled down the Wenaha to the Grande Ronde, where they traded horses with the natives. No name was recorded for what they simply called a "small river".

The flow of settlers into northeast Oregon increased with improvements to the Oregon Trail, although the rugged area around the Wenaha River would remain mostly ignored for decades to come. In 1855 the Nez Perce, under pressure from the influx of white settlers, surrendered 7.5 million acres (30,000 km^{2}) in exchange for monetary compensation and infrastructure development. The Wenaha River basin was included within the original 1855 reservation, with the western boundary of the reservation at the divide between the Wenaha and Walla Walla river basins. "The Wenaha River or Little Salmon was one of Old Chief Joseph’s favorite hunting and fishing grounds... it is not likely that he would have consented to give them up". The US government failed to honor the terms of the 1855 treaty, and in 1863 forcibly reduced the reservation boundaries by 90 percent. All the lands in Washington and Oregon, including the Wenaha basin, were removed from the reservation boundaries. Many Nez Perce leaders refused to sign the 1863 agreement, leading to the 1877 Nez Perce War. Several bands of Nez Perce, most famously Chief Joseph's party, were driven out of their homeland in a series of battles. They were only allowed to return to their much diminished reservation in 1885.

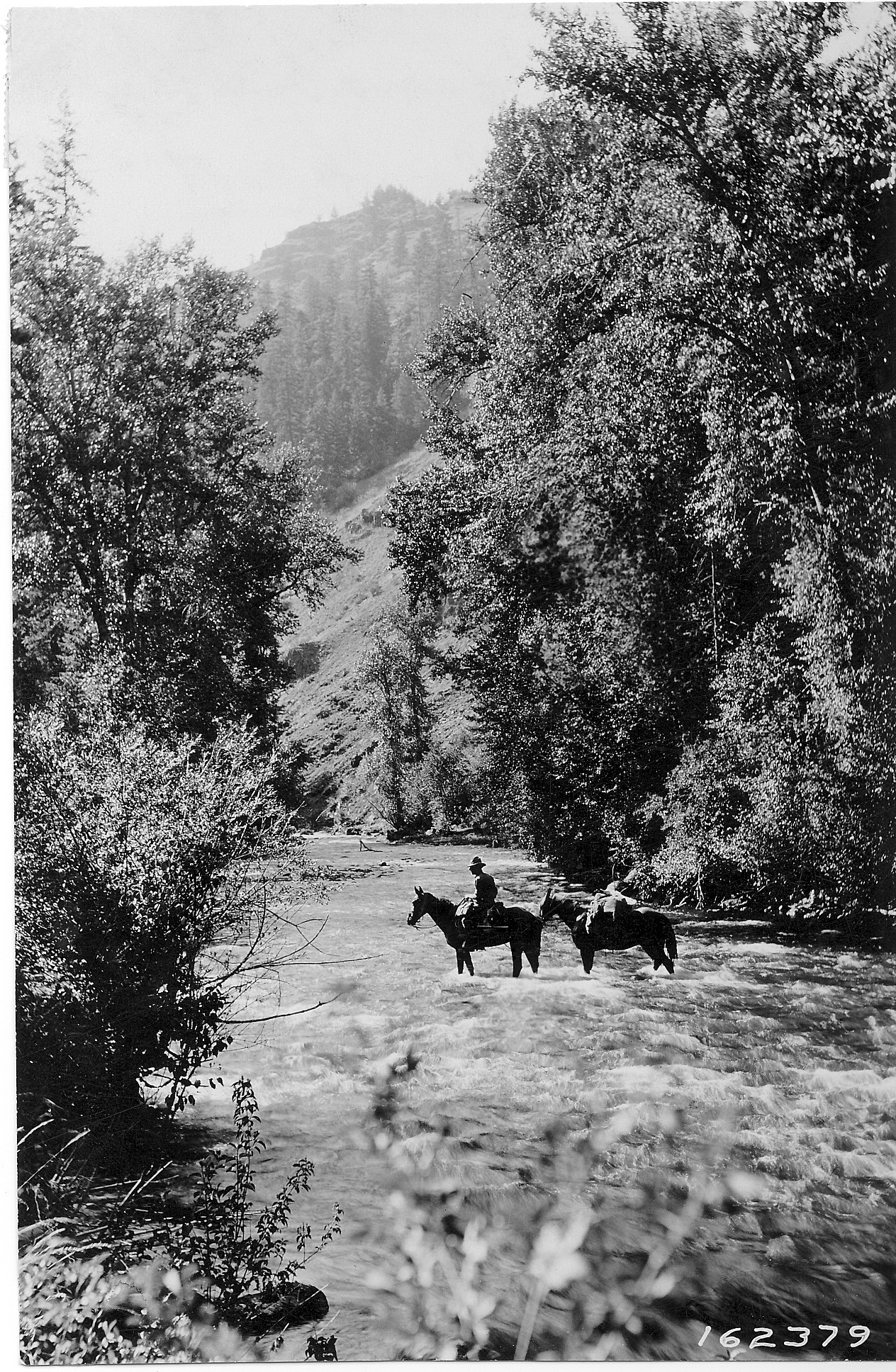
Ranger crossing the Wenaha River, Wenaha National Forest, c. 1915

In the 1880s and 1890s, white settlers began moving in to the tablelands above the confluence of the Wenaha and Grande Ronde rivers. Among the names given to these areas were "Eden" and "Paradise" because of the lush mountain meadows and mild summer temperatures. A plateau to the south of the river is still named Eden Ridge. Settlers continued to arrive until about 1905, when most of the suitable land had been claimed. During this time the Wenaha River was also known to pioneers as the "Little Salmon River", though this name eventually faded from use due to confusion with the nearby Salmon River. Access to this area was initially difficult and all supplies were moved by pack horses over steep mountain trails. The trail from Flora, Oregon, which crossed the Grande Ronde about a mile (1.6 km) below the Wenaha confluence, was widened in the early 1900s to allow wagons, though crossing the river and pulling wagons up the steep slopes remained a challenge. In 1902 the first store was established in Troy, and in 1912 a flour mill was built on the Wenaha River, followed by a post office, hotel, school and other buildings. In the 1940s a road was completed along the Grande Ronde to Troy.

The first cattle drive to Grouse Flats was attempted in the spring of 1887 and met numerous challenges, including deep snow and thunderstorms, on the way from Pomeroy, Washington. Following this, cattle were run in increasing numbers here and in other surrounding high country of the Blue Mountains. Thousands of sheep were also brought into the area, and by the early 1900s overgrazing had a devastating effect on the mountain meadows. In May 1905, President Theodore Roosevelt signed the Wenaha Forest Reserve into law. J.M. Schmitz, the first forest supervisor, found that "the main reason for the overgrazing of the interior was that each spring long before the range was fit to graze there would be a race to get the sheep over the divide and located on the best camps." A meeting was held to divide the range between cattle and sheep grazing, during which the stockmen agreed to divide the area into grazing allotments but no decision was made to reduce the number of animals. In 1907 the Wenaha Forest Reserve became the Wenaha National Forest, and in 1920 it was merged into the Umatilla National Forest, forming what are now the Pomeroy and Walla Walla Ranger Districts.

The Oregon Department of Fish and Wildlife built an experimental fish egg collection station in 1901 near the Wenaha–Grande Ronde confluence, and in 1903 it was moved a few miles up the Wenaha River. After a new station on the Wallowa River proved more productive, the Wenaha station was shut down. In 1912, the Forest Service built a cabin at Dry Gulch (about 3 miles (4.8 km) from the Wenaha's mouth) and a telephone line along the Wenaha River to connect with Troy. In 1920 the line was extended over Weller Butte to Oregon Butte, making the first telephone connection from Troy to Dayton and Pomeroy. In 1938 the lines along the Wenaha River were taken out, in favor of an alignment further north at higher elevation. Many of the present day hiking trails along the Wenaha River and its tributaries were also built during this time, along with nearby fire lookout towers, corrals, and other forest infrastructure.

Although the Wenaha is largely forested, logging was never a major industry there due to the difficulty of access. Settlers used some timber for building, but for the most part trees were cleared on the plateaus to provide more grazing land. Bright (1913) reported:

Those settlers living near the breaks of the Wenaha River and Crooked Fork haul the logs to the edge and shove them over the breaks. Timber is the worst enemy the people have in this region, and clearing the ground is their most difficult problem and requires many years under the process which they are employing. It is most unfortunate that this timber must be so ruthlessly destroyed, particularly as it is the best body of timber within the Wenaha Forest, which, if taken in connection with surrounding timber, might at some future time offer an attractive logging unit when the region is made more easily accessible than it is at the present time.

In the 1960s the U.S. Army Corps of Engineers studied the lower Snake River basin and proposed numerous hydroelectric dams. One such study in 1963 proposed building the "Wenaha Dam" on the Grande Ronde River. It would have flooded an area including the town of Troy and about 5 miles (8.0 km) of the lower Wenaha River. The dam was never built due to opposition from the U.S. Fish and Wildlife Service and state fish and game agencies for "irreparable damages to fisheries resources".

Around 1965, the Forest Service canceled all sheep grazing allotments in what would eventually become the Wenaha-Tucannon Wilderness. In the mid-1970s, the Forest Service proposed salvage logging 30,000 acres (12,000 ha) above the South Fork after a tussock moth infestation caused severe tree mortality. The project generated controversy due to its potential impact on water quality, and that it would provide little to no economic benefit. The Endangered American Wilderness Act of 1978 created the Wenaha-Tucannon Wilderness, with the effect of prohibiting further grazing, logging, mining, and road building along almost the entirety of the Wenaha River.

The Wenaha River was first recommended to be added to the National Wild and Scenic Rivers system in 1970, but it would not be until 1988 when the Oregon Omnibus Wild and Scenic Rivers Act designated the Wenaha River a Wild and Scenic River. along with the nearby Grande Ronde and North Fork John Day Rivers. The North and South Forks of the Wenaha were also considered for Wild and Scenic designation, but were not included in the final bill. Of the total length of the river, 18.7 miles (30.1 km) from Wenaha Forks to the Umatilla National Forest boundary are designated as Wild, and 2.7 miles (4.3 km) in the Wenaha State Wildlife Area downstream of the forest boundary are designated as Scenic. A final 0.15 miles (0.24 km) between the Wenaha State Wildlife Area and the confluence with the Grande Ronde River are designated as Recreational.

In 2015, the Grizzly Bear Complex fire burned almost 83,000 acres (34,000 ha), including a large area in the Wenaha watershed. Previous wildfire suppression had left the area overstocked and "extremely vulnerable to catastrophic wildfire." Following the fire, the Washington Department of Fish and Wildlife began forest thinning and remediation efforts in the Grouse Flats area. The Forest Service worked to stabilize damaged trails and facilitated salvage logging of timber from the burned area. The destroyed Crooked Creek bridge along the Wenaha River Trail was removed, but would not be rebuilt until the summer of 2023.

== Recreation ==
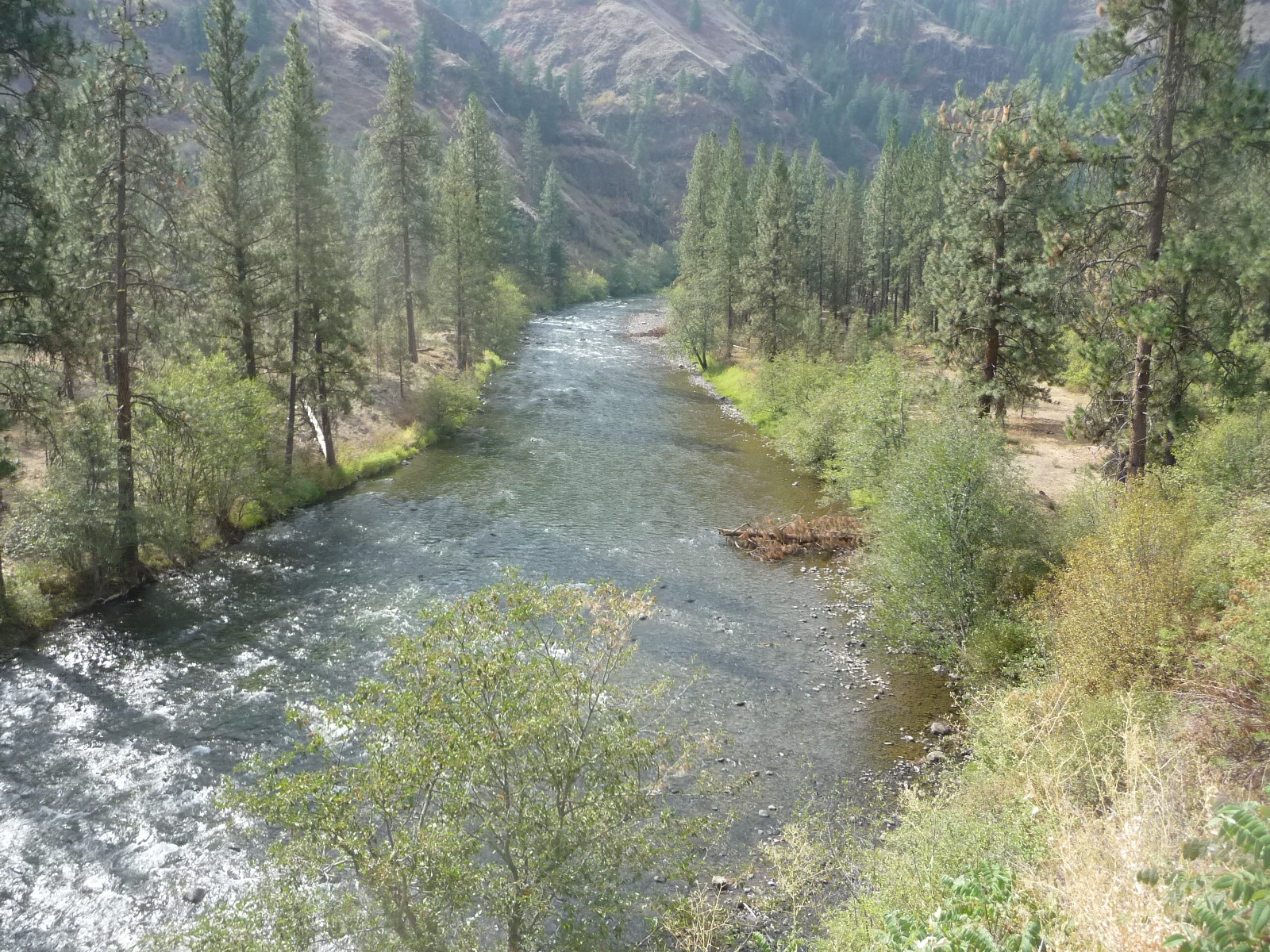
The lower Wenaha River

With access limited to those on foot or horseback, the Wenaha River country remains lightly used and provides numerous backcountry recreation opportunities. The most popular recreational activity in the Wenaha basin has traditionally been elk hunting. In Oregon, the river is managed by the Oregon Department of Fish and Wildlife as the Wenaha Unit, with open season in the fall. Other big game species include deer, bear and cougars. The Wenaha Wildlife Area near Troy is open to upland bird hunting for grouse, chukar, wild turkey and waterfowl.

The Wenaha River Trail follows the main stem and south fork for 31 miles (50 km), starting at Troy and heading west to Timothy Springs trailhead, more than 3,000 feet (910 m) higher in elevation. The trail is used both for day hikes from Troy and for multi-day backpacking or horse trips. The trail provides access to fishing, camping and scenic spots along the Wenaha River. It is also known for extreme summer heat and rattlesnakes. Numerous side trails descend into the canyons and connect with the main Wenaha River trail. Trails from the north, which link to trailheads on the Washington side, are typically blocked by snow until late spring. In total, some 200 miles (320 km) of trails crisscross the Wenaha-Tucannon Wilderness.

The Wenaha is one of only two northeast Oregon rivers, the other being the Imnaha River, where the Oregon Department of Fish and Wildlife allows fishing for bull trout (catch and release only). The river is also open for hatchery steelhead between September 1 and April 30. There is also good fishing for rainbow trout and mountain whitefish. Most fishing is concentrated near the mouth of the river; more secluded reaches upstream require a considerable hike to access.

== See also ==
- List of rivers of Oregon
- List of rivers of Washington (state)
- List of tributaries of the Columbia River
