= North Fork Wenaha River =

- Location of the mouth of the North Fork Wenaha River in Oregon
- Etymology: Perhaps from a Cayuse language placename

Location
- Country: United States
- State: Washington, Oregon
- County: Columbia, Wallowa

Physical characteristics
- Source: Blue Mountains
  - location: Wenaha–Tucannon Wilderness, Columbia County, Washington
  - coordinates: 46°02′38″N 117°54′39″W
  - elevation: 5,885 ft (1,794 m)
- Mouth: Wenaha River
  - location: Wenaha Forks, Wallowa County, Oregon
  - coordinates: 45°57′02″N 117°47′41″W
  - elevation: 2,808 ft (856 m)
- Length: 16 mi (26 km)

The North Fork Wenaha River is a tributary, 16 miles (26 km) long, of the Wenaha River in the U.S. states of Washington and Oregon. The river begins in the Blue Mountains in Columbia County, Washington, and flows generally southeast through the Wenaha–Tucannon Wilderness to meet the South Fork Wenaha River in Wallowa County, Oregon. The combined forks form the main stem Wenaha, a tributary of the Grande Ronde River.

The river has only one named tributary, Deep Saddle Creek, which enters from the right slightly upstream of the Washington–Oregon border. The South Fork Wenaha River also enters from the right.

Chinook salmon and steelhead spawn in the North Fork, and the wilderness near the river provides habitat for diverse species. These include bighorn sheep, elk, bald eagles, cougars, American black bears, among others.

== See also ==
- List of rivers of Oregon
