= Butter Creek (Oregon) =

- Location of the mouth of Butter Creek in Oregon

Location
- Country: United States
- State: Oregon
- County: Umatilla and Morrow counties,

Physical characteristics
- Source: near Matlock Hill
  - location: Umatilla County, Oregon
  - coordinates: 45°12′21″N 119°10′33″W
  - elevation: 5,034 ft (1,534 m)
- Mouth: Umatilla River
  - location: upstream of Hermiston, Umatilla County, Oregon
  - coordinates: 45°47′42″N 119°19′47″W
  - elevation: 545 ft (166 m)
- Length: 57 mi (92 km)
- Basin size: 465 sq mi (1,200 km^{2})

Butter Creek is a 57-mile-long (92 km) stream in the U.S. state of Oregon. The source of the creek is at an elevation of 5,034 feet (1,534 m) in Umatilla National Forest, while the mouth is at an elevation of 545 feet (166 m) upstream of Hermiston, Oregon. Butter Creek has a 465-square-mile (1,200 km^{2}) watershed, and is a tributary of the Umatilla River.

== See also ==
- List of Oregon rivers
- List of longest streams of Oregon
