= North Fork Umatilla River =

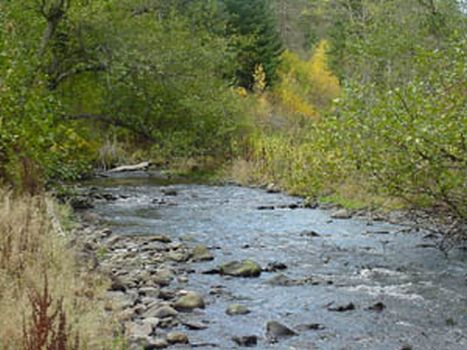
- North Fork Umatilla River

- Location of the mouth of the North Fork Umatilla River in Oregon
- Etymology: Native American (Indian) name for the river

Location
- Country: United States
- State: Oregon
- County: Union, Umatilla

Physical characteristics
- Source: Blue Mountains
  - location: Umatilla National Forest, Union County
  - coordinates: 45°42′17″N 118°02′05″W
  - elevation: 5,102 ft (1,555 m)
- Mouth: Umatilla River
  - location: near Graves Butte, Umatilla County
  - coordinates: 45°43′32″N 118°11′19″W
  - elevation: 2,326 ft (709 m)

The North Fork Umatilla River is a tributary of the Umatilla River in Union and Umatilla counties in the U.S. state of Oregon. Its headwaters lie in the Umatilla National Forest in the Blue Mountains of northeastern Oregon. It flows generally northwest to meet the South Fork Umatilla River near Graves Butte. Together the two forks form the main stem Umatilla.

Near its headwaters, the North Fork flows north along Oregon Route 204 north of Elgin before flowing west through the North Fork Umatilla Wilderness. The river's named tributaries from source to mouth are Johnson Creek, which enters from the left, then Woodward and Coyote creeks, which enter from the right. The South Fork enters from the left at the confluence of the forks.

== Recreation ==
The North Fork Umatilla Wilderness, about 30 miles (48 km) east of Pendleton includes 27 miles (43 km) of trails for hiking and horseback riding. The lower section of the North Fork Umatilla Trail, one of the trails in the network, follows the river.

The Umatilla Forks Campground and Day Use Area, managed by the United States Forest Service, lies near the confluence of the forks. Open from June through September, it has campsites, picnic tables, toilets, drinking water, and parking spaces. In addition to hiking, activities in the area include fishing, hunting, and wildlife viewing.

Woodland Campground, another Forest Service site, is near the river's headwaters along Route 204. Open through November, the campground has tent sites, toilets, picnic tables, and access to hiking trails but no drinking water.

Slightly north of Woodland Campground along the highway is Woodland Sno-Park, also operated by the Forest Service. Local clubs help maintain the park, including its snowmobile trails. The park, generally open from November through April, is frequented by snowshoers and Nordic skiers as well as snowmobilers. Amenities include parking and one vault toilet. The Oregon Department of Transportation oversees snow plowing in the park.

== See also ==
- List of rivers of Oregon
