= South Fork Umatilla River =

- Location of the mouth of the South Fork Umatilla River in Oregon
- Etymology: Native American (Indian) name for the river

Location
- Country: United States
- State: Oregon
- County: Umatilla

Physical characteristics
- Source: Blue Mountains
  - location: Umatilla National Forest
  - coordinates: 45°35′44″N 118°13′07″W
  - elevation: 4,865 ft (1,483 m)
- Mouth: Umatilla River
  - location: near Graves Butte
  - coordinates: 45°43′32″N 118°11′18″W
  - elevation: 2,326 ft (709 m)

The South Fork Umatilla River is a tributary of the Umatilla River in Umatilla County in the U.S. state of Oregon. Its headwaters lie in the Umatilla National Forest in the Blue Mountains of northeastern Oregon near Pileup Saddle and Black Mountain. The South Fork flows generally north between Goodman Ridge and Bobsled Ridge to meet the North Fork Umatilla River near Graves Butte. Together the forks form the main stem Umatilla.

Named tributaries of the South Fork from source to mouth are Shimmiehorn, Thomas, and Buck creeks, which all enter from the right. The North Fork also enters from the right.

The Umatilla Forks Campground and Day Use Area lies near the confluence of the forks. Open from June through September, it has campsites, picnic tables, toilets, drinking water, and parking spaces. Forest Road 32 runs along the lower river below the mouth of Thomas Creek.

== See also ==
- List of rivers of Oregon
