= Jubilee Lake =

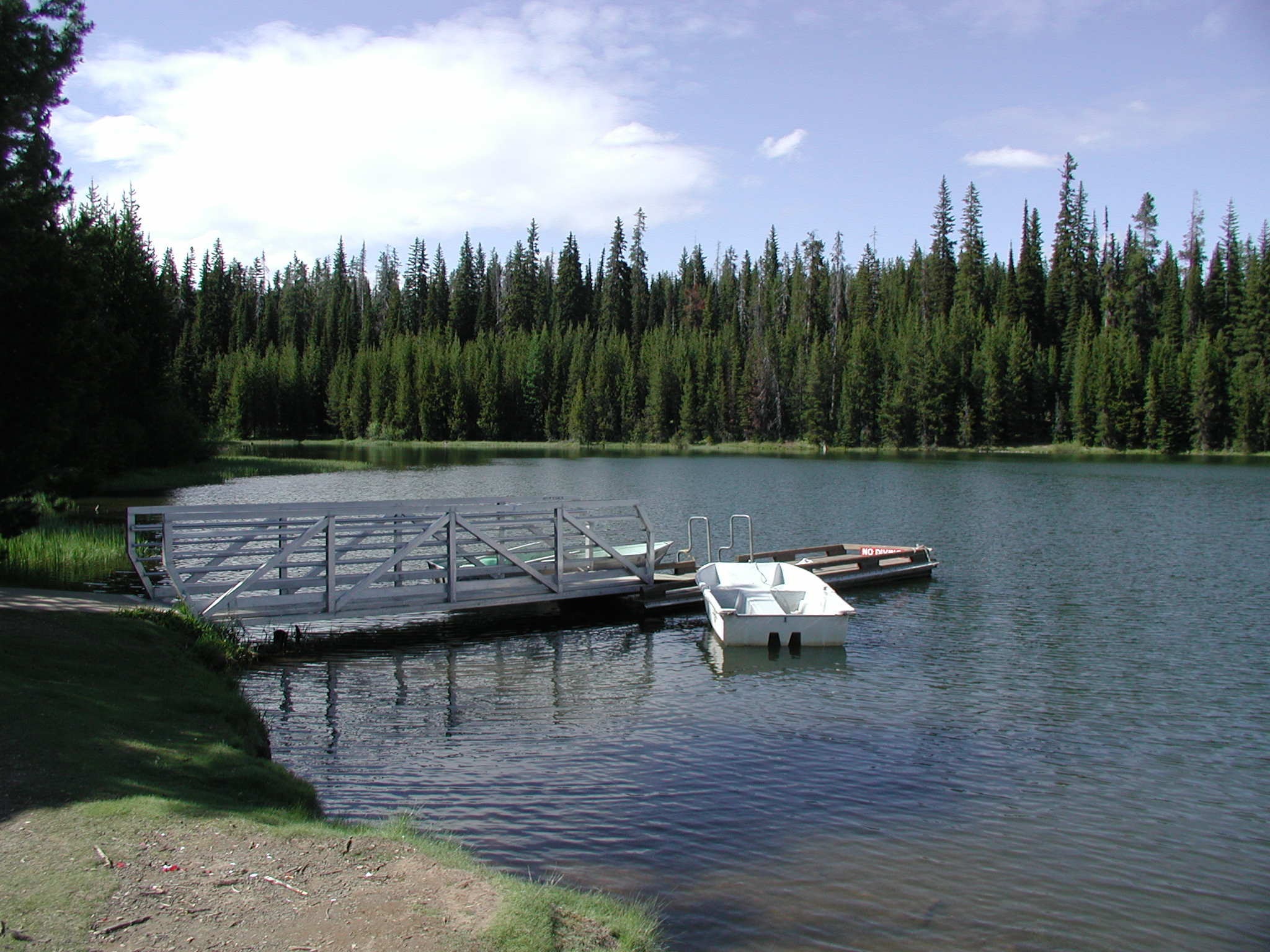
- Dock at Jubilee Lake

- Location within Oregon Location within the United States
- Location: Union County, Oregon, United States
- Coordinates: 45.8315005°N 117.9607769°W
- Type: Reservoir
- Primary inflows: Motett Creek and seasonal streams from melting snow
- Primary outflows: Motett Creek
- Catchment area: 4.2 sq mi (11 km^{2})
- Managing agency: U.S. Forest Service
- Built: 1967–1968
- Surface area: 92.33 acres (37.36 ha)
- Average depth: 16 ft (4.9 m)
- Max. depth: 45 ft (14 m)
- Water volume: 62,639,280 cu ft (1,773,747 m^{3})
- Residence time: 2 months
- Shore length^{1}: 2.6 mi (4.2 km)
- Surface elevation: 4,761 ft (1,451 m)
- ^{1} Shore length is not a well-defined measure.

Jubilee Lake is a 92.33-acre (37.36 ha) man-made lake in the Umatilla National Forest in the northern corner of Union County in the U.S. state of Oregon. It is located 19 miles (31 km) north of Elgin and about 11 miles (18 km) south of the Washington border, at an elevation of 4,761 feet (1,451 m). Its basin spans Union, Umatilla, and Wallowa counties. The lake was made for recreation in 1968 when an earthen dam, 350 feet (110 m) long and 50 feet (15 m) high, was constructed on Motett Creek. A U.S. Forest Service campground at the lake has 53 sites and is the most heavily used campground in the Umatilla National Forest. Fishing and swimming are the most popular activities at the lake. A 2.8-mile (4.5 km) trail around the shore was designated a National Recreation Trail in 1981.

Jubilee Lake is considered mesotrophic, with an intermediate level of biological activity, and its drainage basin receives about 50 inches (1,300 mm) of precipitation annually. Rainbow trout are stocked in the lake for anglers, and a youth fishing event is held at the lake each year.

== See also ==
- List of lakes in Oregon
