= Heppner National Forest =

Former name of forest reserve in Oregon, USA

Coordinates: 45.083°N 119.156°W

Heppner National Forest was established as the Heppner Forest Reserve by the U.S. Forest Service in Oregon on July 18, 1906 with 292,176 acres (1,182.39 km^{2}). It became a National Forest on March 4, 1907. On July 1, 1908 the entire forest was combined with part of Blue Mountains National Forest to establish Umatilla National Forest and the name was discontinued.
