= Cayuse people =

Native American tribe from Oregon and Washington, US

Cayuse
Liksiyu
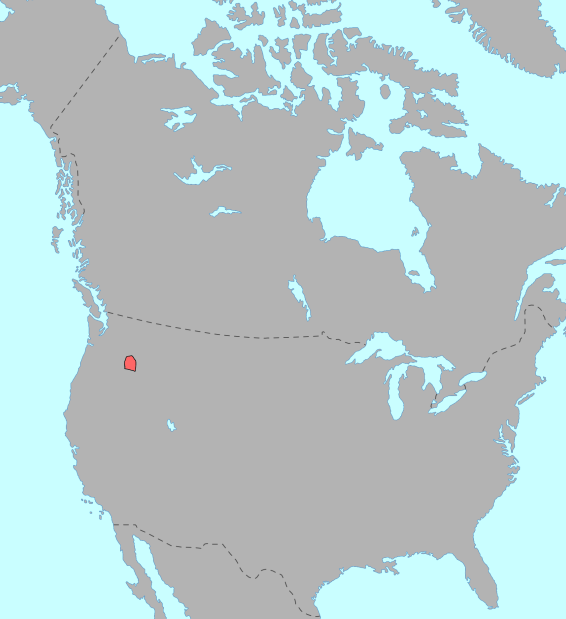
- The Cayuse Tribe land area

Total population
- 2010: 304 alone and in combination

Regions with significant populations
- United States (Washington and Oregon)

Languages
- English, formerly Cayuse

Religion
- Animism, Christianity

Related ethnic groups
- Umatilla, Walla Walla, Nez Perce

Map of the Umatilla Reservation with neighbouring reservations (In red)

The Cayuse are a Native American tribe in what is now the state of Oregon in the United States. The Cayuse tribe shares a reservation and government in northeastern Oregon with the Umatilla and the Walla Walla tribes as part of the Confederated Tribes of the Umatilla Indian Reservation. The reservation is located near Pendleton, Oregon, at the base of the Blue Mountains.

The Cayuse called themselves the Liksiyu in the Cayuse language. Originally located in present-day northeastern Oregon and southeastern Washington, they lived adjacent to territory occupied by the Nez Perce and had close associations with them. Like other Indigenous peoples of the Northwest Plateau, the Cayuse placed a high premium on warfare and were skilled horsemen. They developed the Cayuse pony. The Cayuse ceded most of their traditional territory to the United States in 1855 by treaty and moved to the Umatilla Reservation, where they have formed a confederated tribe.

== History ==
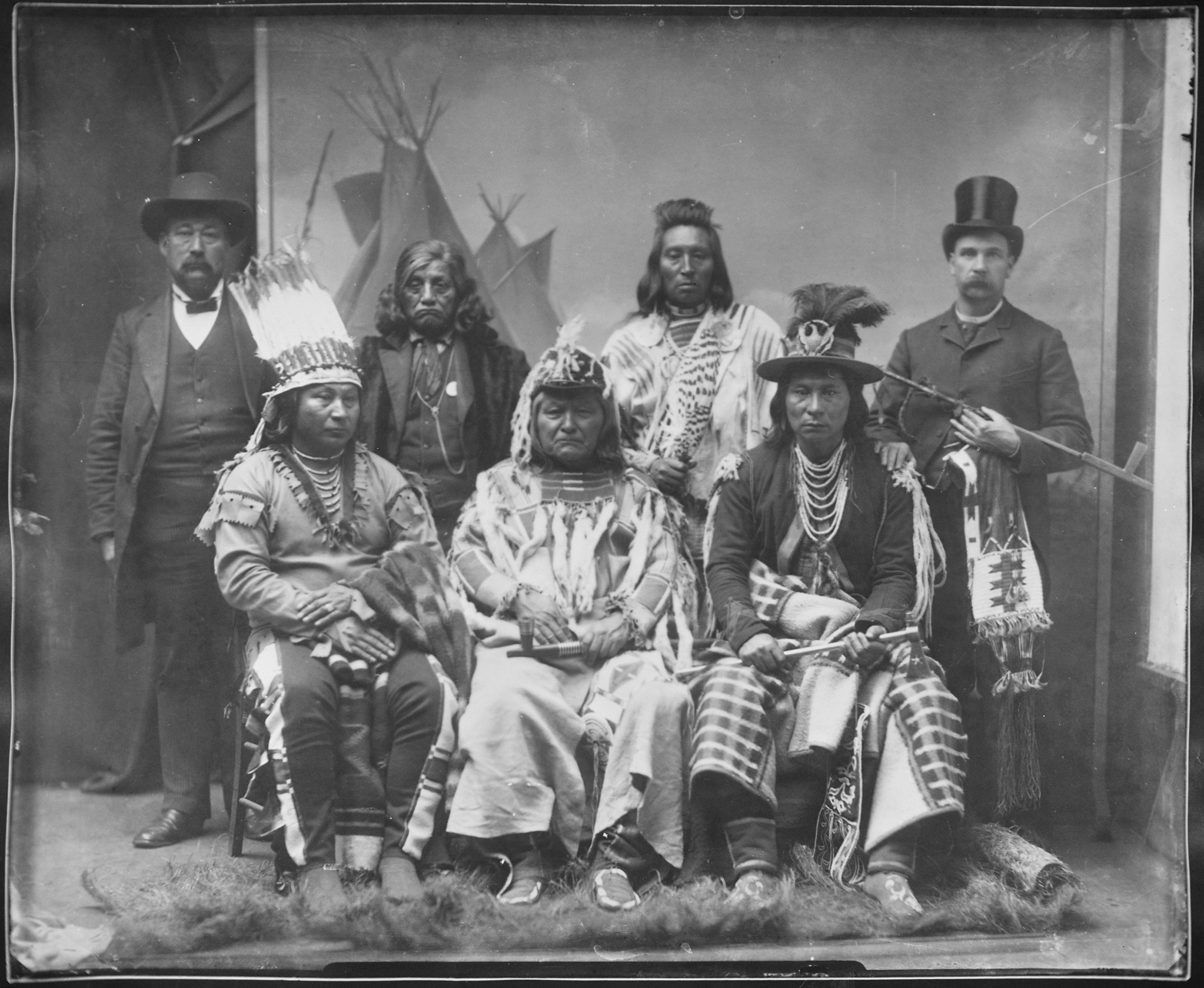
Cayuse and Sahaptin tribal representatives in Washington, D.C. (1890)

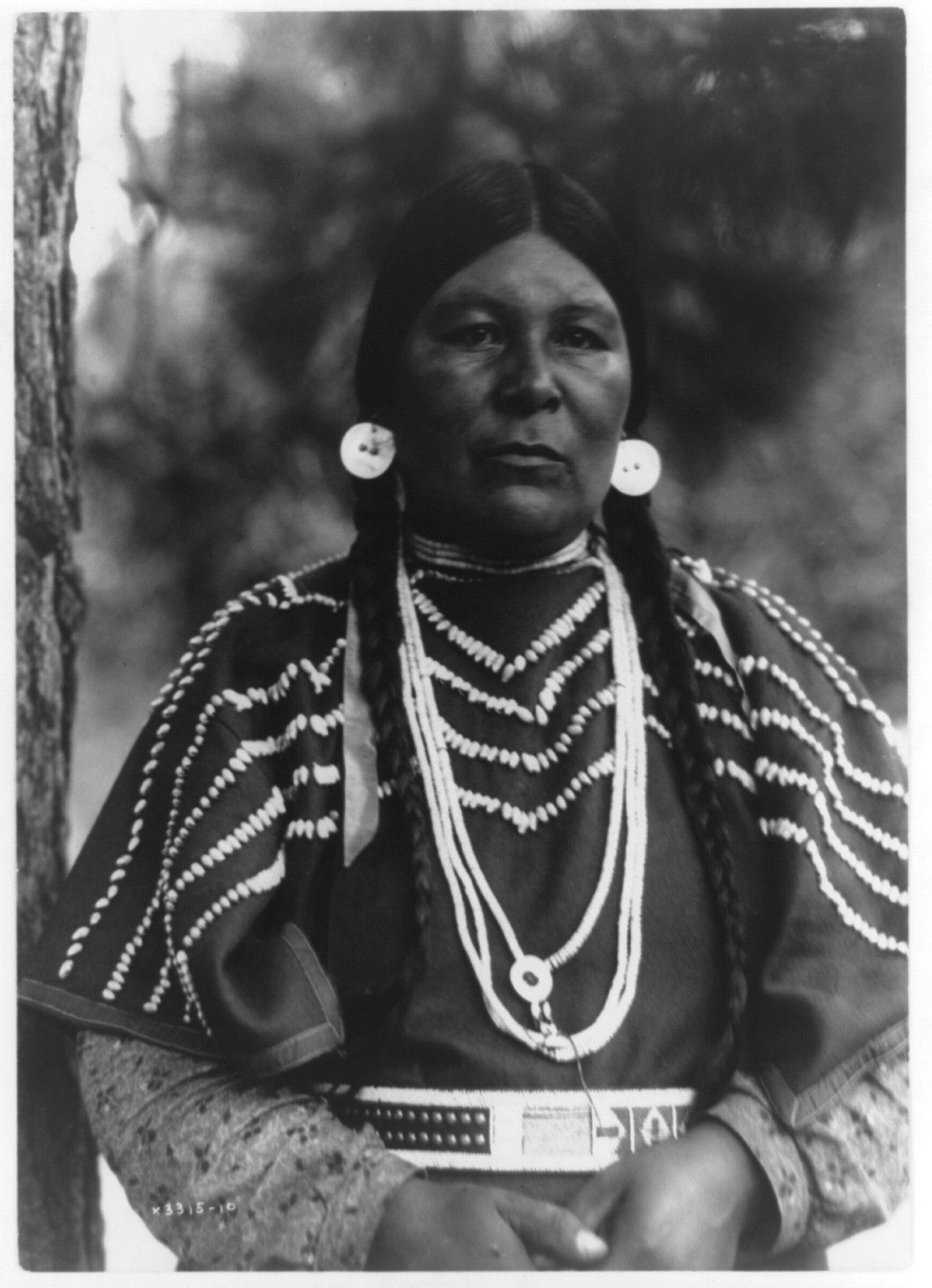
Cayuse woman, about 1910

According to Haruo Aoki (1998), the Cayuse called themselves Liksiyu in their language. Their name Cayuse was derived from the French word "cailloux," meaning stones or rocks, adopted by early French Canadian trappers of the area. The name may have referred to the rocky area the tribe inhabited, or it may have been an imprecise rendering of the name they called themselves. The tribe has been closely associated with the neighboring Nez Percé and Walla Walla. The Cayuse language is an isolate, independent of the neighboring Sahaptin-speaking peoples. The Cayuse population was about 500 in the eighteenth century.

The Cayuse were a seminomadic tribe and maintained summer and winter villages on the Snake, Tucannon, Walla Walla, and Touchet rivers in Washington, and along the Umatilla, Grand Ronde, Burnt, Powder, John Day River, and from the Blue Mountains to the Deschutes River in Oregon. Historian Verne Ray has identified seventy-six traditional Cayuse Village sites, most temporary, seasonal sites; five separate villages in the Walla Walla Valley and seven Cayuse Bands scattered throughout Eastern Oregon and Washington. The Walla Walla River Cayuse Band was called the Pa'cxapu. Other sources name only three distinct regional bands within the Cayuse at the time: two centered on the Umatilla River, and the third on the Walla Walla River.

The Cayuse were known for their bravery, and as horsemen. They bred their ponies for speed and endurance, developing what is now called the Cayuse horse. No longer restricted to what they could carry or what their dogs could pull, they moved into new areas, traveling as far east as the Great Plains and as far south as California, to hunt, trade, fight, and capture slaves. Meanwhile, their herds multiplied rapidly, a combination of skillful breeding and periodic raids on other tribes. By the early 1800s, a Cayuse who owned only 15 to 20 horses was considered poor; wealthy families controlled 2,000 or more. Horses improved the range and effectiveness of war parties, making it possible for Cayuses to dominate their sedentary neighbors on the Columbia. They claimed ownership of The Dalles, the great fishery and trade emporium of the Columbia, forcing the weaker bands in that area to pay them tribute in the form of salmon and other goods. They frequently were in conflict fighting with Piute, Shoshone, and Bannock Tribes to the south and east referred to as the Snake people and other tribes such as the Blackfeet over territory and hunting sites.

As white settlers moved into their territory in large numbers following the opening of the Oregon Trail in 1842, the Cayuse suffered. Even settlers passing through competed with them for game and water. American settlers moved into the region during the California gold rush beginning in 1848 and when gold was discovered in Eastern Oregon in 1862.

Cayuse.

The tribe gained wide notoriety in the early days of the white settlement of the territory. In 1838, Marcus Whitman and his wife Narcissa established a mission among the Cayuse at Waiilatpu ("Place of the Rye Grass"), a site about seven miles from the present-day city of Walla Walla and about a quarter mile east of where the Cayuse Pásxa winter village was located. In 1847, a measles epidemic, suspected by some to be contracted from white settlers, resulted in high fatalities among the tribe. Cayuse leadership believed the missionaries were deliberately poisoning their native people, since a much higher percentage of the natives were dying from the measles than were the whites. In addition, cultural differences and settler encroachment had caused growing tensions.

The Cayuse attacked the missionaries, killing Whitman and his wife Narcissa, and eleven others. They captured 54 European-American women and children and held them for ransom. They destroyed the mission buildings. This attack prompted an armed response by the White settlers and fur traders in the area, sparking the Cayuse War, which continued after Oregon became part of the United States

In the immediate aftermath of the attack on the Whitman Mission, five Cayuse warriors were hanged; see Cayuse Five. The Cayuse put the captives to work together with their members; the adults made clothing for the tribe. They released the hostages after the Hudson's Bay Company brokered an exchange of 62 blankets, 63 cotton shirts, 12 Hudson Bay rifles, 600 loads of ammunition, 7 pounds of tobacco and 12 flints for the return of the now 49 surviving prisoners. The Cayuse and many from other nearby tribes such as the Walla Walla Tribe were hunted down and killed. The Cayuse eventually lost the war. They were forced to cede their land to the US and shared a reservation with the Umatilla and Walla Walla.

By 1851, the Cayuse had long intermarried with the neighboring Nez Percé, with whom they had sheltered; many learned their language. Kathleen Gordon, a Tribal member of the Confederate Tribes of the Umatilla Indian Reservation, was a Cayuse/Nez Pierce Language instructor who spoke and taught the Nez Pierce language, but also knew small amounts of the Original Cayuse Language that is now extinct.

In 1855, the Cayuse joined the Treaty of Walla Walla with the Umatilla and Walla Walla by which the Umatilla Indian Reservation was formed. Since that time, they have officially resided within the reservation's limits. During the mid-twentieth century, some members moved to cities under the Indian Relocation Act of 1956, an effort to give better access for contemporary jobs.

Their number was officially reported as 404 in 1904; this number may be misleading. A count in 1902 found one pure-blooded Cayuse on the reservation. Descendants with ancestry partially of the other tribes may still have identified as Cayuse. The Cayuse language is believed to have become extinct by then. As the members of the three tribes have intermarried, they no longer keep separate population numbers.

== Lifestyle ==
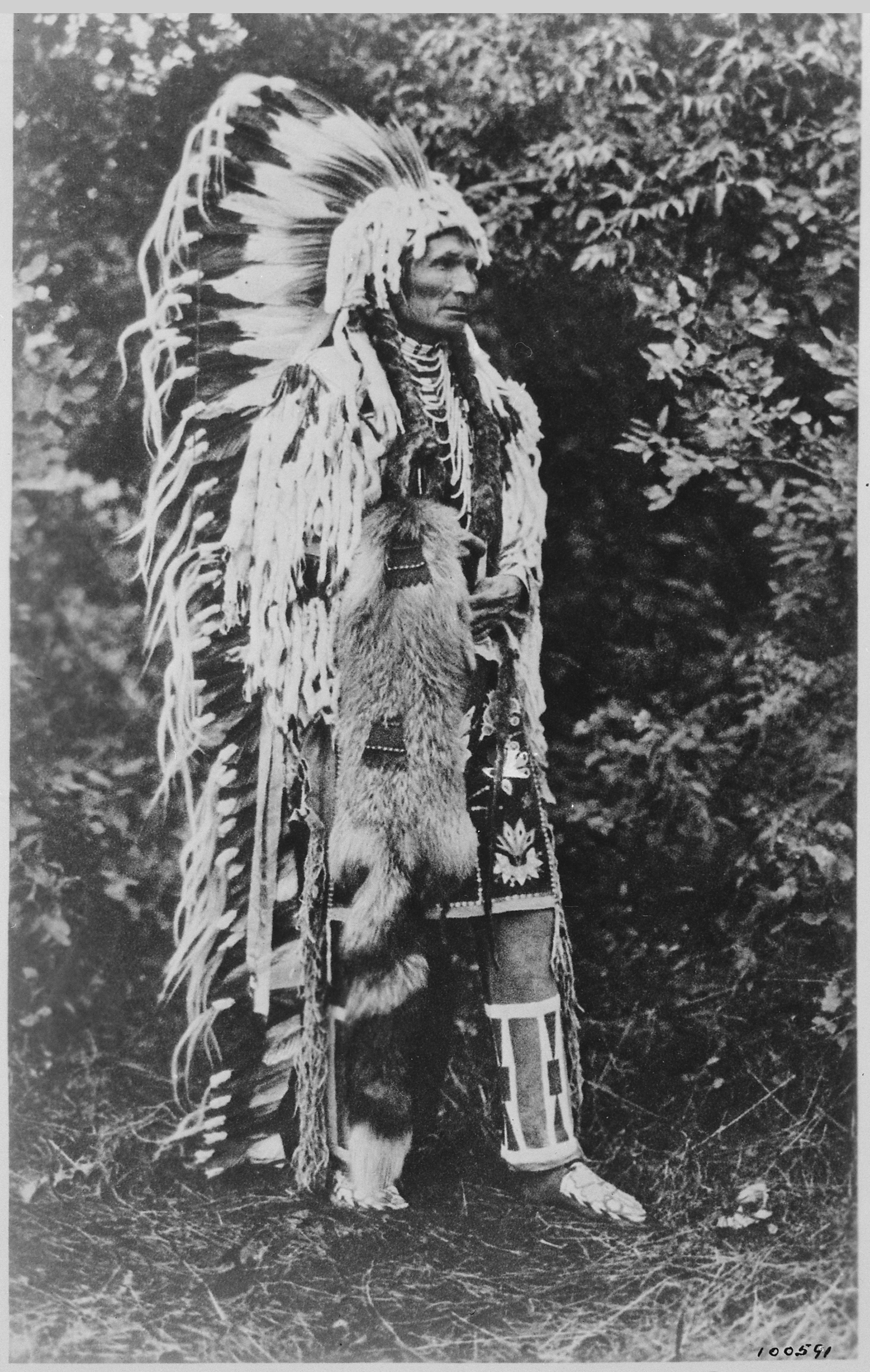
Umapine (Wakonkonwelasonmi), a Cayuse chief, September 1909

The Cayuse Indians were located in the Columbia Basin and were nomadic, sometimes moving on a daily basis. They lived in teepees, which many nomadic tribes used for portability. The Cayuse were skilled horsemen, and used horses in hunting. They also used them for their trip over the Rocky Mountains each year to hunt a supply of buffalo to bring back for their families. The men hunted game and fished salmon. The women gathered and picked berries and dug and processed roots. The women also processed the animal skins to make materials for shelter and clothing. The men considered bravery to be an important quality, with brave warriors being held in high esteem. The strongest would be made chief.

== Language ==
The Cayuse language is a language isolate and has been extinct since the 1930s. Weyíiletpuu was a dialect of the Nez Perce language spoken by the Cayuse inhabitants of the Confederated Tribes of the Umatilla Indian Reservation. It has not been used since the 1940s and is designated as extinct.

== Cuisine ==
One of the Cayuse's main food sources was salmon from the Columbia River. During winter, many Cayuse have traditionally convened in "winter villages" along rivers to fish for sustenance. Along with trout and lamprey, they also hunted elk and deer, as well as small game such as rabbits and fowl. They have also gathered wild celery, berries, serviceberries, chokeberries, currants, and camas. In some cases, traditional harvesting practices continue to this day.

== Notable Cayuse ==
- Tawatoy (known as Young Chief), Head Chief, uncle and predecessor of the next Young Chief (Weatenatemany), was a well-known leader and warrior
- Weatenatemany (also known as Young Chief, c.18??–1859), Head Chief, nephew of Tawatoy, became the new Young Chief in October 1853, leader of the more conciliatory faction of the Cayuse, killed in a skirmish with the Snake during the summer of 1859.
- Five Crows (also known as Achekaia or Hezekiah), brother and first successor of Tauitau, and leader of the hostile Cayuse, principal rival to Tauitau's son Young Chief (Weatenatemany) for the role of Head Chief.
- Anna Minthorn Wannassay (also known as Anna Cash Cash): member of the first board of trustees at Umatilla Indian Reservation, consultant to the Happy Canyon annual pageant
