= North Fork Umatilla Wilderness =

Wilderness area in Oregon, United States

- IUCN category Ib (wilderness area)
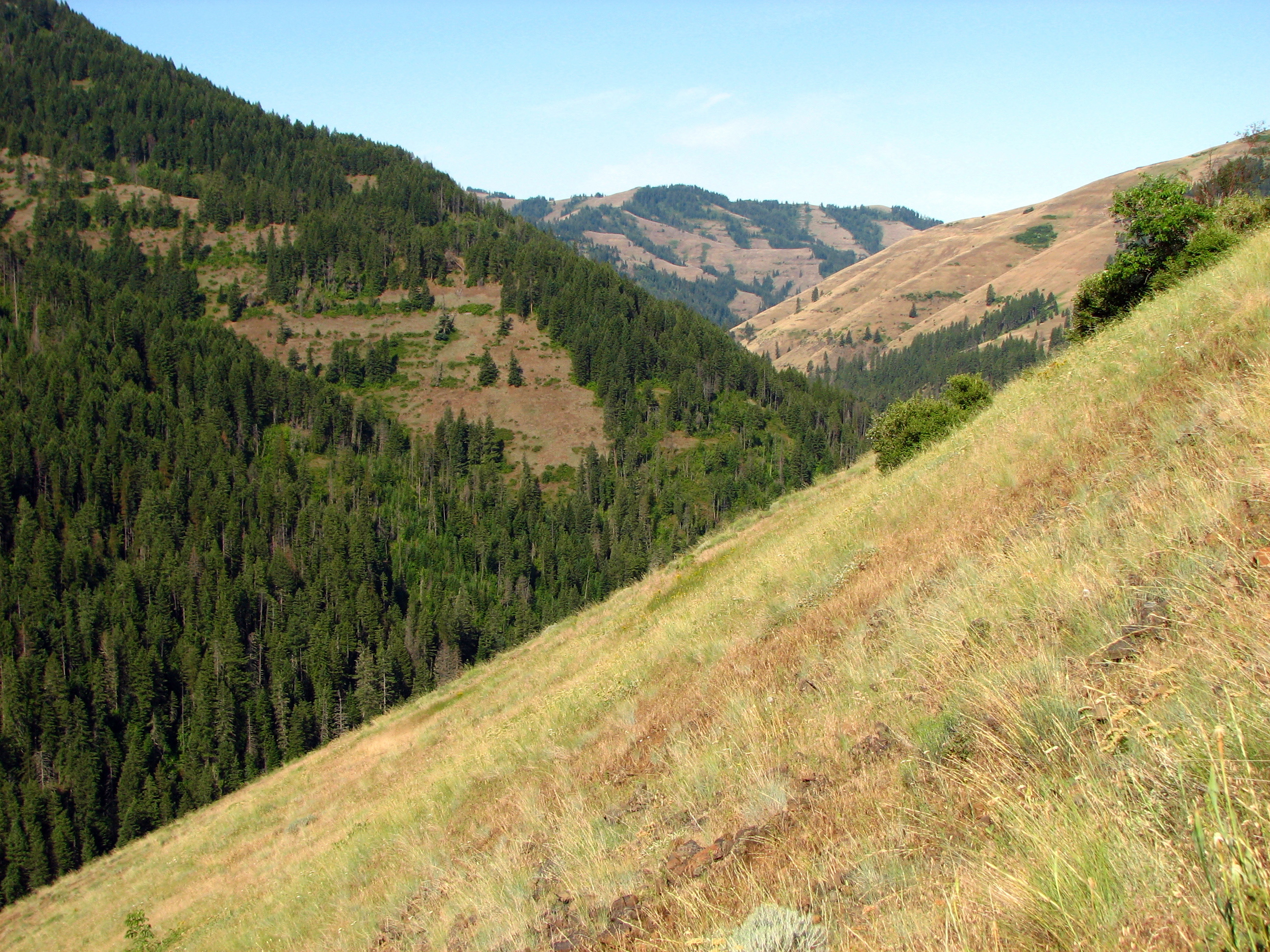
- View to the west from the Coyote Ridge trail. The North Fork of the Umatilla River lies at the bottom of this canyon.

- Location within Oregon Location within the United States
- Location: Umatilla / Union counties, Oregon, United States
- Nearest city: Weston, Oregon
- Coordinates: 45°43′00″N 118°08′57″W
- Area: 20,144 acres (8,152 ha)
- Established: 1984
- Governing body: United States Forest Service

The North Fork Umatilla Wilderness is a wilderness area located inside the Umatilla National Forest, in the Blue Mountains of northeastern Oregon. It is the smallest wilderness in northeast Oregon, encompassing only 20,144 acres (8,152 ha) in Umatilla and Union counties.

== Topography ==
The elevation of the North Fork Umatilla Wilderness ranges from 2,000 to 5,400 feet (610 to 1,650 m), and is characterized by terrain that varies from gentle, sloping hills to extremely steep, timbered canyons below a high plateau. Common vegetation includes juniper, sagebrush, ponderosa pine, fir, spruce, lodgepole pine, and western larch.

== Wildlife ==
The North Fork Umatilla River supports a sizeable population of bull trout, as well as anadromous fish such as steelhead. There are also several streams within the wilderness that contain native trout, and a few streams support spawning steelhead. Big game animals found in the wilderness include Rocky Mountain elk and deer. Other wildlife in the wilderness include blue and ruffed grouse.

== Recreation ==
Primary recreational activities in the North Fork Umatilla Wilderness include hiking, camping, hunting, fishing, and horseback riding. The North Fork of the Umatilla River is designated catch and release only. There is a 27-mile (43 km) hiking trail system, which opens up early in the season due to the low elevation of the Wilderness.

== See also ==
- List of Oregon Wildernesses
- List of U.S. Wilderness Areas
- Wilderness Act of 1964
