= Anna Minthorn Wannassay =

Cayuse woman (1886–1972)

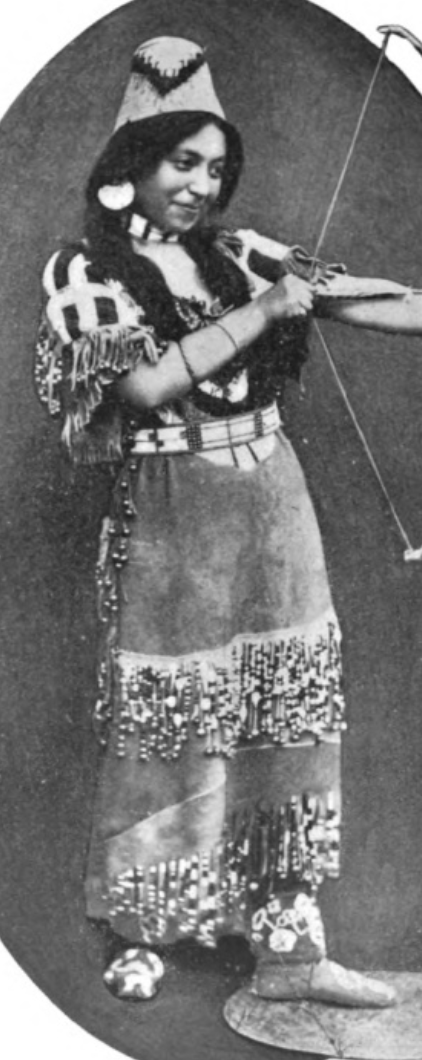
- Anna Minthorn, as photographed by Lee Morehouse, in a 1905 publication
- Born: January 6, 1886; Umatilla Indian Reservation, Oregon, U.S.
- Died: May 30, 1972 (age 86); Oregon, U.S.
- Other names: Anna Cash Cash, Annie Kashkash, Anna Minthorne, Anna Wannassay
- Occupations: Educator, missionary, cultural advisor, community leader

Anna E. Cash Cash Minthorn Wannassay (January 6, 1886 – May 30, 1972) was a Cayuse community leader. In 1916 she advised on the script of a "Wild West" pageant called the Happy Canyon Show, an annual western-themed pageant still running as of 2025.

== Early life and education ==
Minthorn was raised on the Umatilla Indian Reservation in Oregon, the daughter of Philip Cash Cash Minthorn and Lizzie Jackson Minthorn. Her grandfather Yellowhawk was a tribal leader. She attended the Carlisle Indian Industrial School in Pennsylvania between 1899 and 1906; her brother Wilford Minthorn also attended Carlisle. She graduated in 1906, in the same class as Alaskan educator Kathryn Dyakanoff Seller. Photographs of Minthorn as a young woman wearing traditional regalia, taken by Lee Morehouse, were widely reprinted in American newspapers and magazines, and appeared in souvenir books.

== Career ==
Minthorn was recommended for an assistant matron position at the Pottawatomie School in Kansas in 1907. In 1909, she was described as a Christian mission worker in Oregon. In 1916, she helped Roy Raley to revise his script of the Happy Canyon Show, a Wild West-style pageant. Her input added "tribal scenes" to the historical narrative. She was also active in the pageant's annual beauty contest, into her last years.

Wannassay was a member of the first Board of Trustees of the Confederated Tribes of the Umatilla Indian Reservation, and is remembered as an advocate for healthcare services on the reservation. She was a charter member of the Oregon Trail Women's Club, and an active member of the Tutuilla Presbyterian Church. In 1966 she received the Outstanding Indian Award from the Westward Ho! Parade organization.

== Personal life and legacy ==
Minthorn lost her hearing in one ear after a fever and tuberculosis in 1906. She married Jason Charles Wannassay. They had five children and lived in Pendleton, Oregon. Their son Everett died in childhood. She died in 1972, at the age of 86. The Happy Canyon Show, "the longest-running outdoor pageant and wild west show in the United States", used the script Wannassay helped to craft until 2001, and still uses some of the sections suggested by Wannassay. A house she once lived in was demolished in 2016; a marker on the site tells her family's story.
