= Cayuse language =

Extinct Native American language formerly spoken in Oregon

Cayuse
- Liksiyu
- Native to: United States
- Region: Oregon
- Ethnicity: Cayuse
- Extinct: 1930s
- Language family: Language isolate

Language codes
- ISO 639-3: xcy
- Glottolog: cayu1241
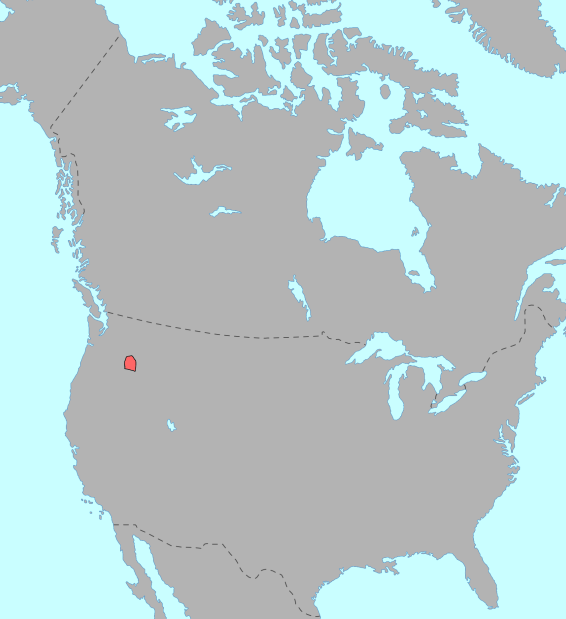
- Pre-contact distribution of the Cayuse language

- Cayuse is classified as Extinct by the UNESCO Atlas of the World's Languages in Danger.

Cayuse is an extinct language isolate once spoken by the Cayuse people (autonym: Liksiyu) of Oregon.

== Classification ==
The first written vocabulary of the Cayuse language was published by Horatio Hale in 1846. As a member of the United States Exploring Expedition, he had visited the Pacific Northwest in 1841. Missionary Marcus Whitman was credited for providing "much valuable information" about the Cayuse people and other natives nearby Waiilatpu. Whitman was credited as the origin of the Waiilatpuan linguistic family. In his Waiilatpuan language family, Hale put Cayuse and the Molala language as the sole members.

In 1910 or 1911, Stephens Savage, a Molala speaker, had told Leo Frachtenberg that the following five words were identical in both Cayuse and Molala:

sorrel horse	qasqasi tasiwitkwi
spotted horse	yuꞏk tasiwitkwi
black horse	múkimuki tasiwitkwi
comb	taꞏsps
spoon	ƚúꞏpinc

In 1929 Edward Sapir grouped Cayuse with Molala as part of the Waiilatpuan branch of the Plateau Penutian languages.

Bruce Rigsby reexamined the Cayuse-Molala lexical pairs provided by Hale in 1969 and found only a tenth to be potentially related terms. The words presented by Savage were concluded by Rigsby to likely be loanwords. Upon his review of extant Molala and Cayuse linguistic data, Rigsby concluded "I do not see how the two languages could have possibly been mutually intelligible."

== Pronouns ==
Cayuse pronouns listed by Hale:

I	iniŋ
you (sg.)	nikí
you (du.)	nkímiš
he	nip
we	námək
you (pl.)	mkímiš
they	nípik

Cayuse pronouns listed by McBean:

I	in ning
you (sg., pl.)	in kai
he	neepe
we	nung naw naw
they	cap pick

== Verbs ==
Cayuse verb paradigms documented by Henry W. Henshaw:

'hungry'

I am hungry.	wi-tu-tŭnt
I was hungry.	kler-ka-wĭ-tu-tŭnt
I will be hungry.	wí-tu-näk-sŭnt
You and I are hungry.	swi-tu-ter-yìk
You and I were hungry.	swi-tu-te-lì-kai-ĭk
You and I will be hungry.	nĭng-i-li-pʔl-swi-tu-nak-stunk-a-wak
You are hungry.	tu-swi-tu-tuñg-a
You were hungry.	swi-tu-til-kutla
You will be hungry.	swi-tu-nak-stung-at-la

'thirsty'

I am thirsty.	nĭs-ka-mu-tiñg
I was thirsty.	nĭs-ka-mu-til
I will be thirsty.	nĭs-ka-mu-näk-skĭn
You are thirsty.	tu-mĭs-ka-mu-tĭñg
You were thirsty.	mĭs-ka-mu-til-hă
You will be thirsty.	mĭs-ka-mu-na-stĭnk-la

== Vocabulary ==
Limited lexical items in Cayuse have been collected by Rigsby, Melville Jacobs, Verne Ray, and Theodore Stern. Their Cayuse informants had highly limited knowledge of the language and were more fluent in either Sahaptin or Nez Perce.

=== Hale ===
A word list of Cayuse with nearby 200 lexical items was documented by Hale. The word list has been reproduced below.

==== Nouns ====
gloss	Cayuse
man	yúant
woman	pintχlkaíu; watχlóa
boy	láutlaŋ
girl	staítχləŋ; staítlaŋ
infant; child	skútχla
father	pintét; títʃa
mother	penín; nínʃa
husband	ináiu
wife	inχlkaío
son	wái
daughter	wái
brother	pnákən; pənátaŋ
sister	pənátiaŋ; pənwaíəq
Indian; people	-
head	talʃ; táəlʃ
hair	tχlókomot
face	léequkʃ
forehead	penátχliʃ
ear	takʃ
eye	hăkaməʃ
nose	pitχlóken
mouth	səmqakʃ
tongue	puʃ
teeth	tenif
beard	ʃimkéməʃ
neck	yet
arm	tiélaq
hand	épip
fingers	épip
nails	ʃíŋiʃ
body	ʃilăməʃ
leg	maúwət
foot	tiʃ
toes	tiyəyáu
bone	pápət
heart	-
blood	tiwéə̈ʃ
town; village	-
chief	iatóiaŋ
warrior	lotéwa
friend	enlápoit
house	niʃt
kettle	tχlípaniʃ
bow	hífoit
arrow	lalχ
axe; hatchet	yeŋgókinʃ
knife	ʃekt
canoe; boat	tχláap
shoes	täítχlo
pipe	iptnχlónʃ
tobacco	hanʃ
sky; heaven	ndjălawaía, tíŋpap
sun	huéwiʃ
moon	hátχltóp
star	tχlítχliʃ
day	ewéiə̈
night	ftalp
light	notawásim
darkness	ʃilímtiŋk
morning	tétχlpəna
evening	wəχaía
spring	ʃuatoluŋátntiŋ; kiátim
summer	ʃqáätim
autumn	təŋ
winter	wit
wind	húntilχp
thunder	tiŋtululutéʃin
lightning	ʃniktawíŋtiŋ
rain	tiʃtkitχlmítiŋ
snow	pói
hail	puŋiós
fire	tetʃ
water	iʃkáiniʃ
ice	tók
earth; land	liŋʃ
sea	yamué-iʃkaíniʃ
river	luʃmi
lake	fuŋʃ
valley	paniákp
hill; mountain	téit
island	liŋtkaíli
stone	ápit
salt	kamtiʃímpen
iron	qauqauítχliínik
tree	laúik
wood	hútiʃ
leaf	qaisós
bark	pétimi
grass	tχleft; qə́ïʃt
pine	laúikʃ
flesh; meat	pítχli
dog	náapaŋ
buffalo	-
bear	liméakʃ; nokoláo
wolf	tχlaíu; tsóilaχs
deer	aitχléwa
elk	yútiŋʃ
beaver	pīeká
tortoise	atsík
fly	tqaínʃiʃ; katχlísaŋ
mosquito	píŋkii
snake	waíimaʃ
bird	tianíyiwa
egg	lópitχl
feathers	tiaqaímutχl
wings	haŋ
duck	əʃimtχl
pigeon	súuku
fish	wiaíiʃ
salmon	milóqli
sturgeon	-
name	peʃp
affection	atíŋp; tiʃktaʃewetáuŋko

==== Adjectives ====
gloss	Cayuse
white	tχlaktχláko
black	ʃkupʃkúpu
red	lakaítlakaítu
blue	yotsyóts
yellow	qəʃqə́ʃu
green	yotsyóts
great	yaúmua; yiyímu (pl.)
small	etsáŋua
strong	ntáloa; naantáloa
old	kuiátsu
young	itsáŋu
good	suaíu; sasuáiu (pl.)
bad	luastu; laluástu (pl.)
handsome	hapútsu; suaíu
ugly	huástu
alive	wióko
dead	úwaa
cold	ʃúŋa
warm	lokóia

==== Pronouns ====
gloss	Cayuse
I	íniŋ
thou	nikí
he	nip
we	námək
ye	mkímiʃ; nkímiʃ (dual)
they	nípik
this	qe, qă, ke
that	qá, ká
all	naŋináo
many (much)	yíphea
who	iʃ

==== Adverbs and others ====
gloss	Cayuse
near	piáfi
today	páməŋ
yesterday	iétin
tomorrow	tetχlp
yes	i
no	téehu

==== Numerals ====
gloss	Cayuse
one	na
two	lépli
three	mátnin
four	pípiŋ
five	táwit
six	nōiná
seven	nóilip
eight	nōimát
nine	tanáuiaiʃímʃim
ten	niŋítelp
eleven	nántetχle
twelve	leplin-ntétχle
twenty	lépuik
thirty	mátuík
one hundred	niŋítalpuík
one thousand	-

==== Verbs ====
gloss	Cayuse
to eat	pitáŋa
to drink	pasqunstáŋa
to run	pqíntuql
to dance	iókseak
to sing	tuŋséaql
to sleep	ʃpíʃiŋql
to speak	úlipkin
to see	miskaléntənt
to love	ktáʃo
to kill	piaíitχltiŋ
to sit	ifníql; ifníkta
to stand	laútsiŋ
to go	wintúkstaŋa; wintúql (imp.)
to come	wintúkum
