= Theodore Stern =

American academic and educator (1912–2013)

Theodore "Ted" Stern
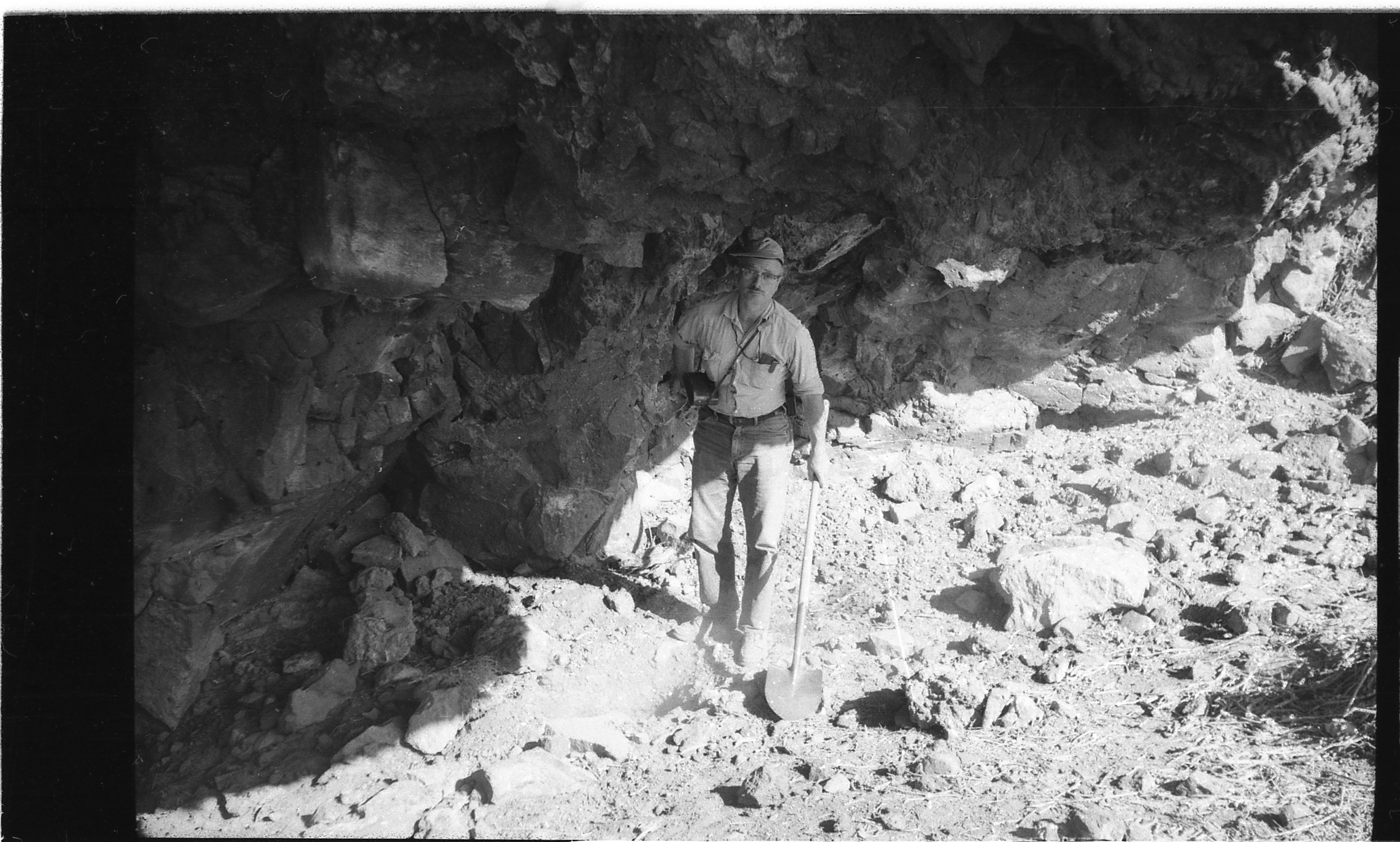
- Paisley Cave, 1966
- Born: Theodore Sanders Stern; December 25, 1912; New York City, New York, U.S.
- Died: January 18, 2013 (aged 100); Charleston, South Carolina, U.S.

Theodore Sanders Stern (December 25, 1912 – January 18, 2013), was an American academic and educator who was named the 16th President of the College of Charleston in 1968.

When Stern first arrived, there were 432 students enrolled and 28 faculty members and only 8 of them had doctorate degrees. At that time the College was facing a financial crisis. With the help of the South Carolina government he was able to ensure the future of the college. By the time he stepped down in 1978, Stern had grown the enrollment to 5,300 students.

He led the initiative to construct the Robert Scott Small Library. In 1968 Stern admitted the first African American student to the College of Charleston. During his interview for President, he was asked what he would do if an African American applied to the college. Stern replied that he would review the application the same as any other.

In 1970, he personally housed the first foreign students. After stepping down Stern remained active in the development of the College of Charleston. The student union is named for Stern, who also ensured the area behind Addlestone Library would be open green-space as opposed to a parking lot.

Stern reached the age of 100 on December 25, 2012. He died less than a month later, on January 18, 2013.

== Legacy ==
The Ted Stern Cup, named in his honor, is awarded annually to a graduating senior who exemplifies the character of the College of Charleston. The Stern Cup is one of the three highest awards (the other two awards are the Bishop Smith Award and the Alexander Chamblis Award) that a student can achieve at the College and is the culmination of their four years at the College.
