= Wenaha National Forest =

Former national forest in Oregon and Washington

Coordinates: 46.0°N 117.8°W

Wenaha National Forest was established as the Wenaha Forest Reserve by the U.S. Forest Service in Oregon and Washington on May 12, 1905 with 731,650 acres (2,960.9 km^{2}). It became a National Forest on March 4, 1907. On November 5, 1920 the entire forest was transferred to Umatilla National Forest and the name was discontinued.
