= Wenaha–Tucannon Wilderness =

Wilderness area in the Blue Mountains spanning areas of both Oregon and Washington

- IUCN category Ib (wilderness area)
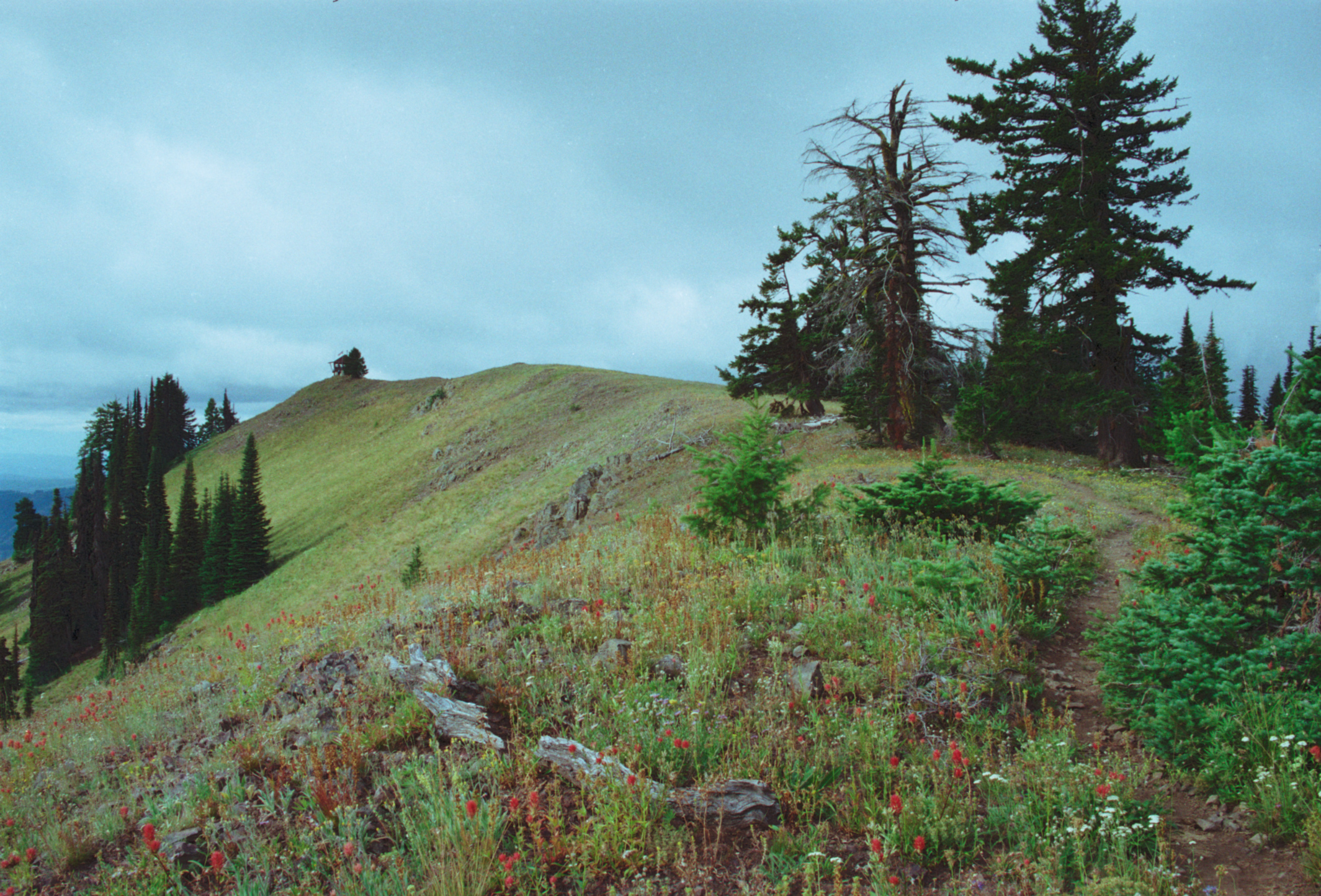
- Summit of Oregon Butte
- Interactive map of Wenaha–Tucannon Wilderness
- Location: Wallowa County, Oregon and Columbia / Garfield / Asotin counties, Washington, United States
- Nearest city: Milton-Freewater, Oregon and Walla Walla, Washington
- Coordinates: 45°59′59″N 117°46′00″W
- Area: 177,423 acres (71,801 ha)
- Established: 1984
- Governing body: U.S. Forest Service

The Wenaha–Tucannon Wilderness is a federally designated wilderness area in the Blue Mountains of northeastern Oregon, and southeastern Washington, United States. It was created by the Endangered American Wilderness Act of 1978 and encompasses 177,423 acres (71,801 ha) in the Umatilla National Forest — 66,375 acres (26,861 ha) in Oregon and 111,048 acres (44,940 ha) in Washington.

== Topography ==
The Wehana–Tucannon Wilderness consists primarily of rugged basaltic ridges separated by deep canyons with steep slopes. The area's precipitation drains south into the Wenaha River, east to the Grande Ronde River and Asotin Creek, and north into the Tucannon River, each part of the Snake River watershed. To the west drainages are the Touchet River and Mill Creek, both leading to the Walla Walla River, and the Umatilla River, a direct tributary of the Columbia River. The Wilderness ranges in elevation from 2,000 feet (610 m) on the Wild and Scenic Wenaha River to 6,401 feet (1,951 m) atop Oregon Butte at 46.1105°N 117.6797°E in Washington.

== Vegetation ==
Ponderosa pine dominates the lower drainages of the Wenaha–Tucannon Wilderness. Above about 4,500 feet (1,400 m), it transitions to a forest of lodgepole pine with some species of larch, fir, and spruce as well. Subalpine fir, native grasses, and forbs are found at the highest elevations of the wilderness.

== Wildlife ==
The Wenaha–Tucannon Wilderness is home to a variety of wildlife, including Shiras moose, Rocky Mountain elk, bighorn sheep, whitetail and mule deer, black bear, cougar, grey wolf, coyote, snowshoe hare, rattlesnake, and pine marten. Both the Tucannon and Wenaha Rivers provide spawning habitat for Chinook salmon and steelhead trout.

== Recreation ==
Popular recreational activities in the Wenaha–Tucannon Wilderness include camping, horseback riding, wildlife watching, and hiking the area's 200 miles (320 km) of trails. Elk hunting and fishing are also popular pastimes in the wilderness.

== Images ==
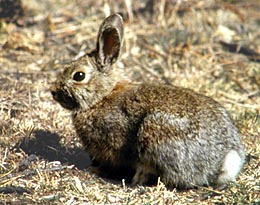
Snowshoe hare (Lepus americanus)

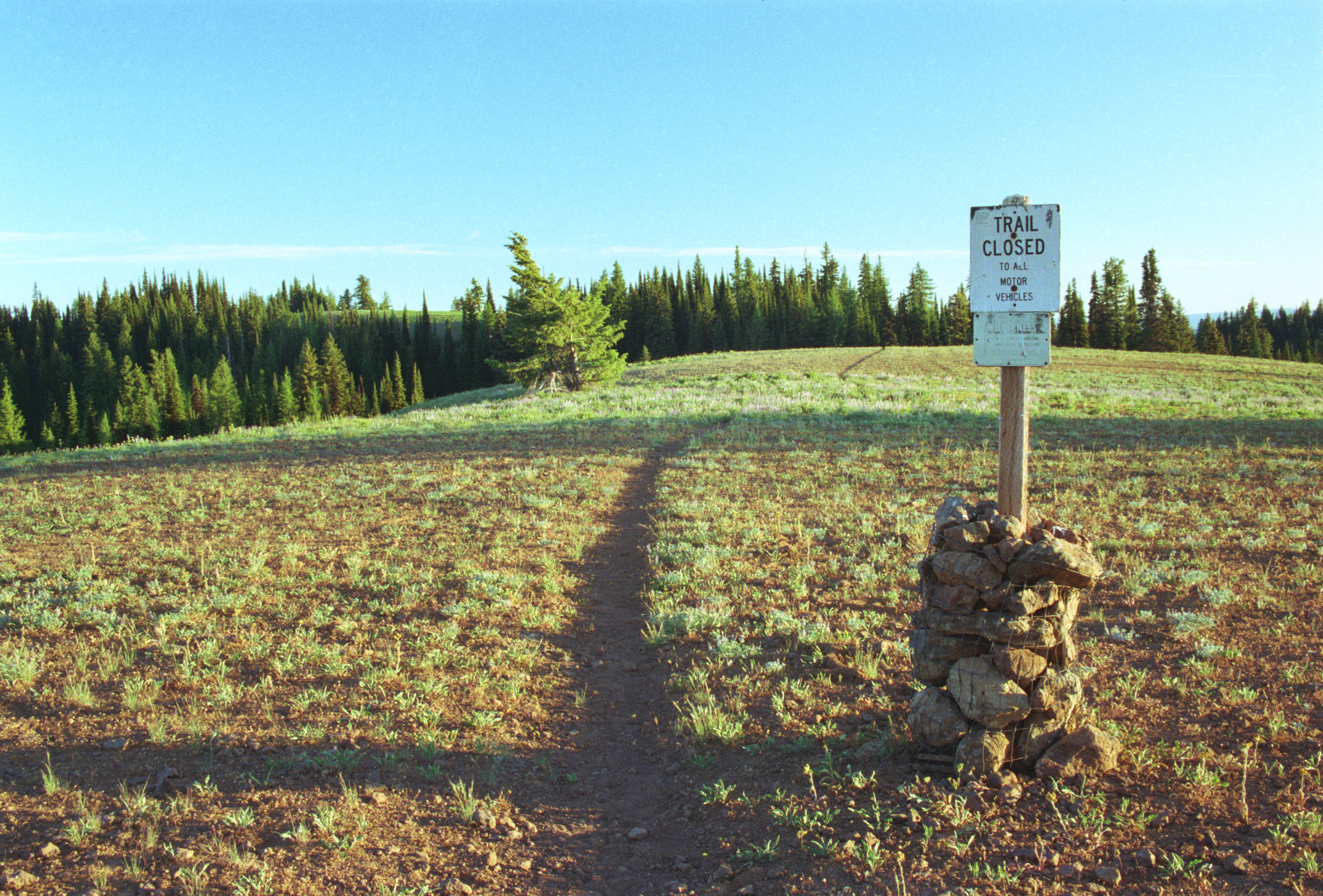
Mt. Misery Trail #3113 near Diamond Peak

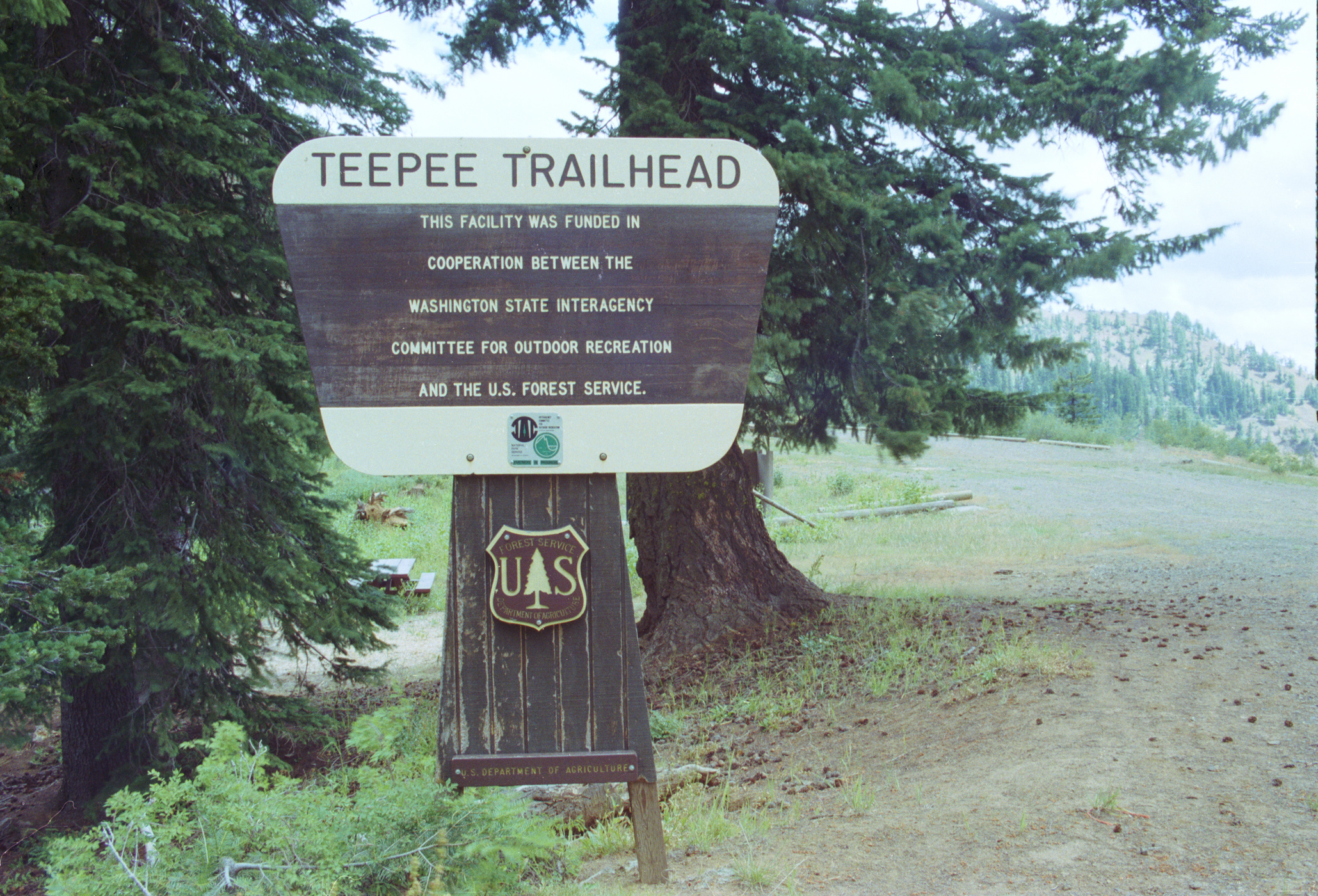
Tepee Trailhead

== See also ==
- List of Oregon Wildernesses
- List of U.S. Wilderness Areas
- National Wilderness Preservation System
- Wilderness Act
