= Umatilla River =

River in Oregon, U.S.

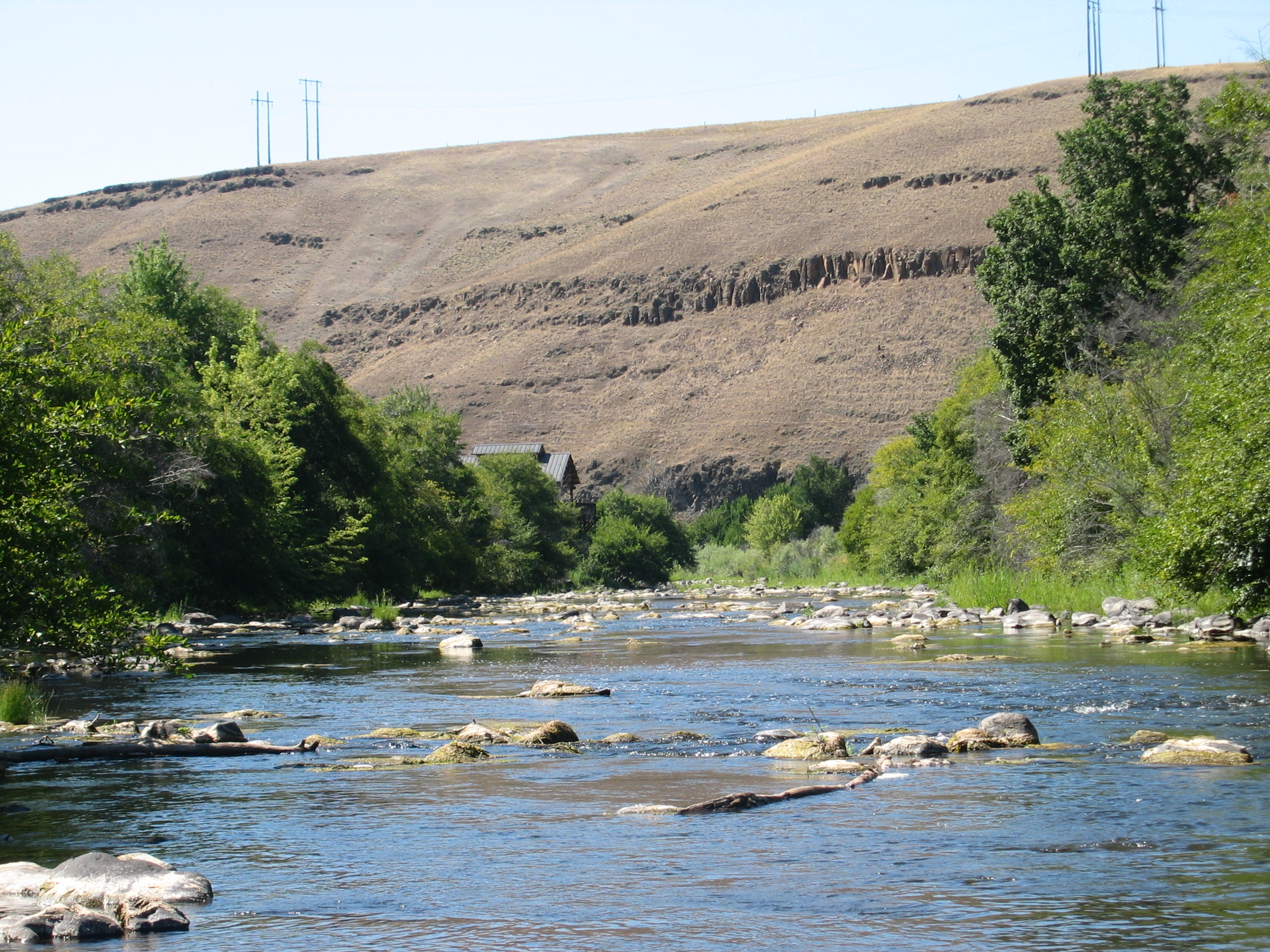
- The Umatilla River, flowing through northern Pendleton, July 2005

- Location of the mouth of the Umatilla River in Oregon
- Etymology: Native American name for the river

Location
- Country: United States
- State: Oregon
- County: Umatilla

Physical characteristics
- Source: Confluence of north and south forks
  - location: Blue Mountains
  - coordinates: 45°43′32″N 118°11′17″W
  - elevation: 2,332 ft (711 m)
- Mouth: Columbia River
  - location: Umatilla, Oregon
  - coordinates: 45°55′09″N 119°21′20″W
  - elevation: 269 ft (82 m)
- Length: 89 mi (143 km)
- Basin size: 2,450 sq mi (6,300 km^{2})
- Discharge
  - location: near Umatilla, 2.1 miles (3.4 km) from the mouth
  - average: 494 cu ft/s (14.0 m^{3}/s)
  - minimum: 0 cu ft/s (0 m^{3}/s)
  - maximum: 19,800 cu ft/s (560 m^{3}/s)

The Umatilla River is an 89-mile (143 km) tributary of the Columbia River in northern Umatilla County, Oregon, United States. Draining a basin of 2,450 square miles (6,300 km^{2}), it enters the Columbia near the city of Umatilla in the northeastern part of the state. In downstream order, beginning at the headwaters, major tributaries of the Umatilla River are the North Fork Umatilla River and the South Fork Umatilla River, then Meacham, McKay, Birch, and Butter creeks.

The name Umatilla is derived from the Native American autonym of the people residing along its banks, the Umatilla, who called themselves Imatalamłáma ("People from the Village Ímatalam [on the Peninsula formed by the confluence of Umatilla River with the Columbia]"), which was first recorded as Youmalolam in the journals of the Lewis and Clark Expedition and spelled in many other ways in early books about Oregon.

Today the river is also called Nixyáawi wána in the Umatilla language, meaning "Pendleton area River, i.e. Umatilla River".

== Course ==
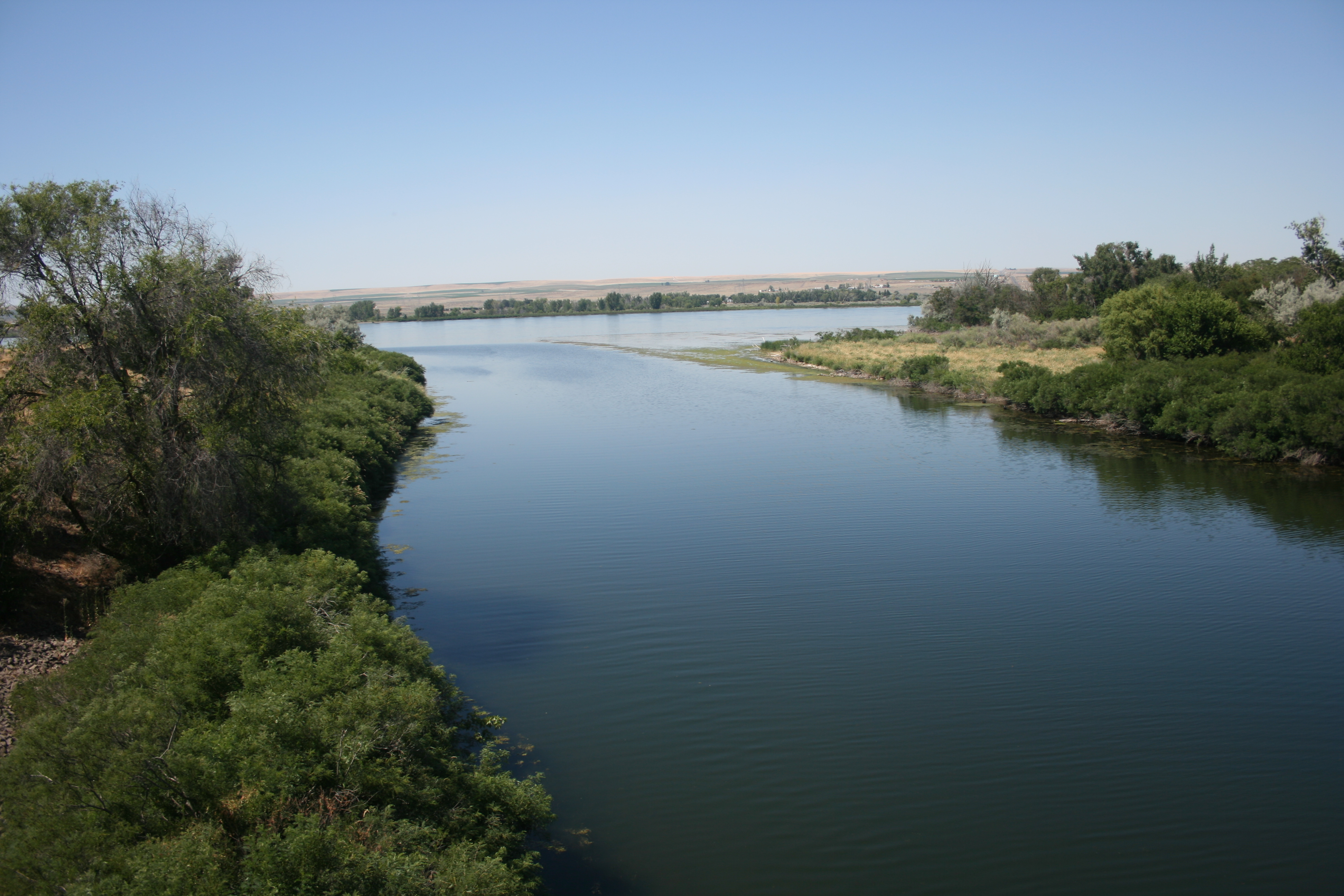
Mouth of the Umatilla River at the Columbia River in Umatilla, July 2013

The Umatilla River's headwaters lie in the Blue Mountains at the confluence of its north and south forks in the Umatilla National Forest of northeastern Oregon. Flowing generally west, the river receives Lick Creek and Bear Creek, both from the right before reaching the unincorporated community of Bingham Springs. Further downstream it receives Rock Creek from the right, then Bobsled, Augur, and Ryan creeks from the left before entering the Umatilla Indian Reservation and reaching the unincorporated community of Gibbon. From Gibbon to the river mouth, tracks of the Union Pacific Railroad run parallel to the stream. Between Gibbon and Cayuse, three creeks—Squaw, Buckaroo, and Coonskin—enter the river from the left. Downstream of Cayuse, Moonshine, Cottonwood, and Mission creeks also enter from the left.

The river flows by Mission at about river mile (RM) 61 or river kilometer (RK) 98, leaves the Indian reservation, and reaches the city of Pendleton at about RM 56 (RK 90), passing under Oregon Route 11. Wildhorse Creek enters from the right, then Patawa Creek from the left. The river passes under Interstate 84 (I-84) and receives McKay Creek from the left. Shortly thereafter, Birch Creek enters from the left about 50 miles (80 km) from the mouth. Coombs Creek enters from the left about 3 miles (4.8 km) below that, and then the river, turning north, flows along Fort Henrietta Park in the city of Echo and under I-84 again. The Umatilla reaches Stanfield about 23 miles (37 km) from the mouth, then passes under Oregon Route 207 and receives Butter Creek from the left. Reaching Hermiston at about RM 9 (RK 14), the river flows by a United States Geological Survey (USGS) stream gauge about 2 miles (3 km) from the mouth, then passes under Interstate 82 and Oregon Route 730 before entering the Columbia River at Umatilla.

The Umatilla River joins the Columbia at what is called Lake Umatilla, a reservoir formed by the John Day Dam on the Columbia. The confluence is 289 miles (465 km) from the Columbia's mouth on the Pacific Ocean at Astoria. McNary Dam, another dam on the Columbia, is slightly upstream at about RM 292 (RK 470).

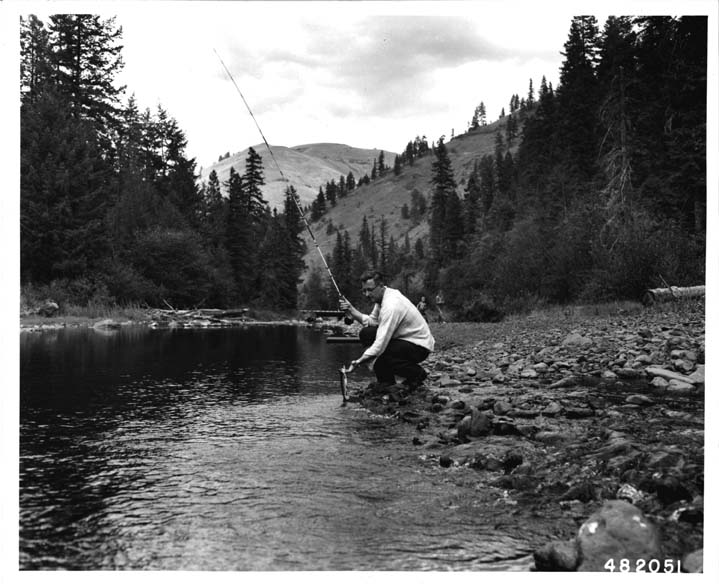
Trout fishing at Buck Creek Organization Camp in Umatilla River (September 1956)

== Fish ==
The Umatilla River supports populations of spring Chinook, fall Chinook, and Coho salmon as well as small trout in its upper reaches. Public access to salmon and steelhead fishing is fairly good downstream of the Oregon Route 11 bridge. Upstream of the bridge, the river runs through the Umatilla Indian Reservation, where fishing is limited to those with a tribal permit.

== See also ==
- List of rivers of Oregon
- List of longest streams of Oregon

== Works cited ==
- McArthur, Lewis A., and McArthur, Lewis L. (2003) [1928]. Oregon Geographic Names, 7th ed. Portland: Oregon Historical Society Press. ISBN 0-87595-277-1.
- Shewey, John (2007). Complete Angler's Guide to Oregon. Belgrade, Montana: Wilderness Adventures Press. ISBN 978-1-932098-31-0.
