= Troy, Oregon =

Unincorporated community in the state of Oregon, United States

Coordinates: 45°56′49″N 117°27′06″W

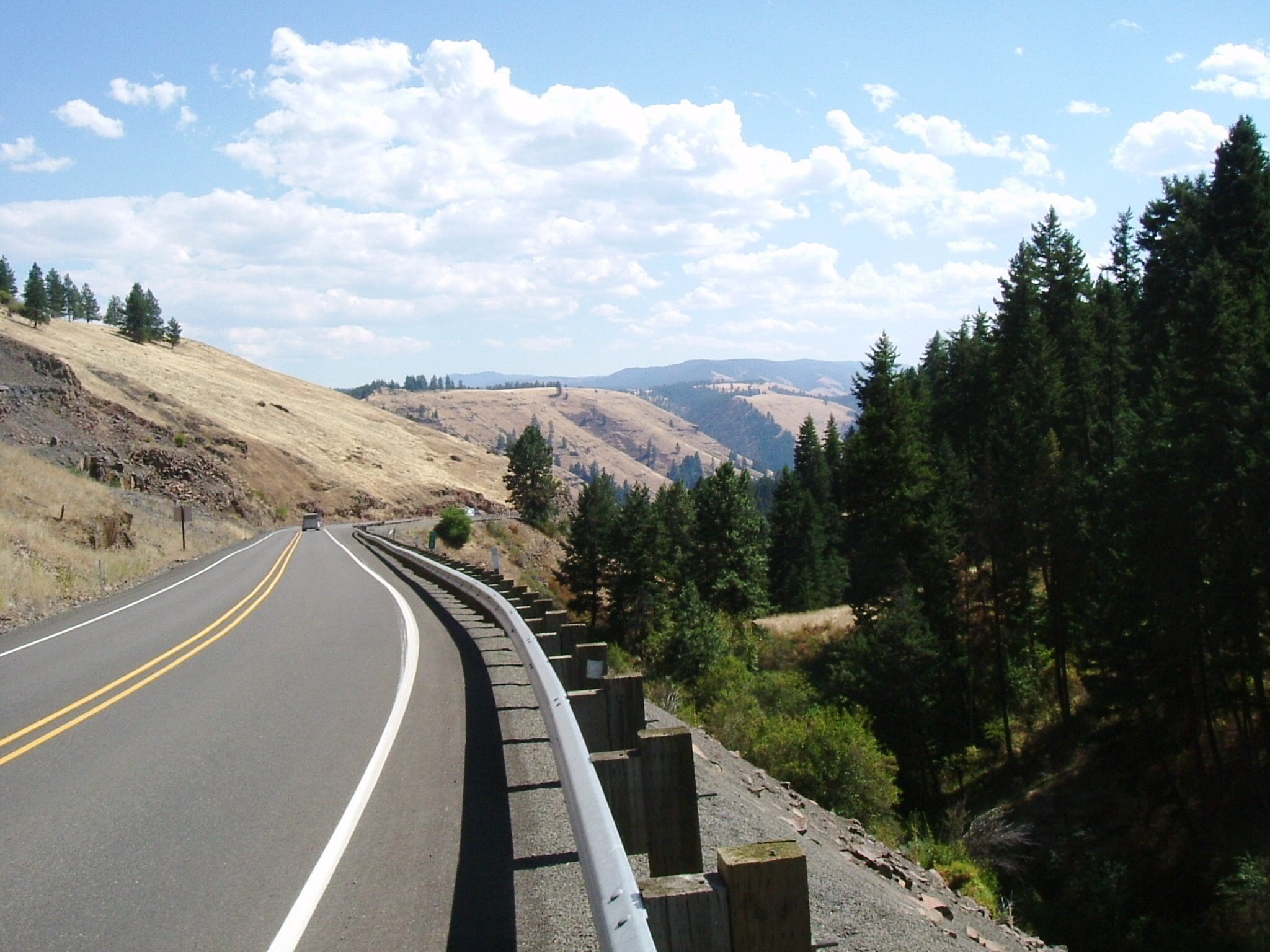

Troy is an unincorporated community in Wallowa County, Oregon, United States at the confluence of the Grande Ronde and Wenaha rivers. Troy is west of Flora on Oregon Route 3 near the Washington state line. It is known for its excellent steelhead fishing, and has several cabins and airbnbs to rent. There is also a very fine public elementary school.

Troy began to form in the late 1890s, with the establishment in the area of a Mormon settlement called Nauvoo named after the more famous settlement in Illinois. A post office was opened in 1902, and a formal town was platted in 1910. In 1931, the name of the town was officially changed to Troy, presumably honoring a son of the area's original Mormon settlers, Troy Grinstead. A ferry may have already been serving the Grande Ronde River at the location. The town was always a service center for the surrounding farms and ranches, and a "fisherman's getaway paradise" in its relative isolation and lack of commercial enterprise.

With the arrival of the "urban drift" in the 1960s, the small town's population dwindled, services which could also be found in nearby Flora closed. The closure of the post office in 1965 reduced the town to its present status as a fishing, hunting, vacation site, with permanent residents estimated at 25 people.
