= Umatilla National Forest =

National forest in the U.S. states of Oregon and Washington

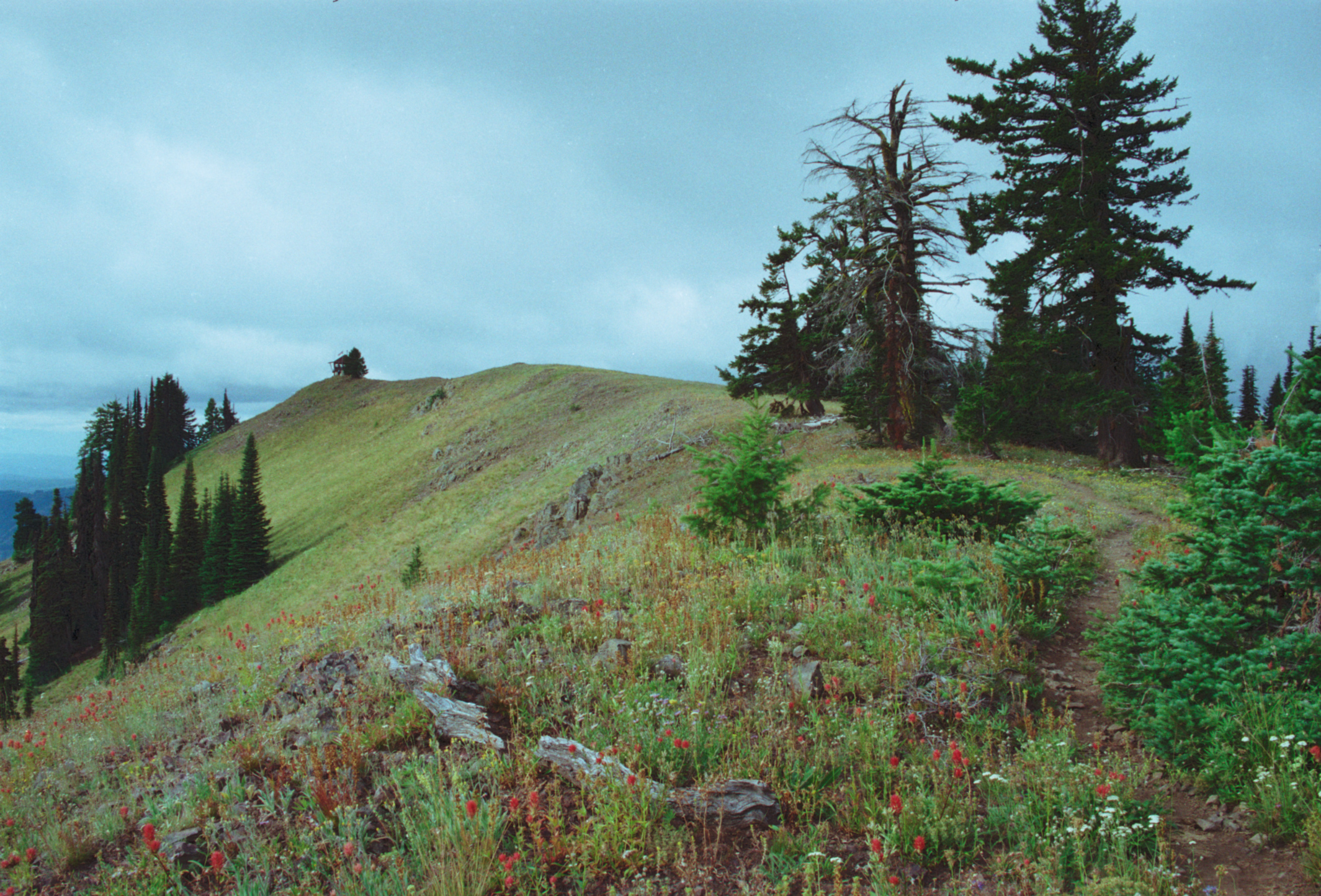
- Oregon Butte in the Wenaha–Tucannon Wilderness, Umatilla NF

- Location within the United States
- Location: Oregon / Washington, United States
- Nearest city: Elgin, Oregon
- Coordinates: 45°38′00″N 118°11′00″W
- Area: 1,407,087 acres (569,428 ha; 2,199 mi^{2}; 5,694 km^{2})
- Established: July 1, 1908; 118 years ago
- Visitors: 703,000 (in 2006)
- Governing body: U.S. Forest Service
- Website: http://www.fs.usda.gov/r06/umatilla

The Umatilla National Forest, in the Blue Mountains of northeast Oregon and southeast Washington, covers an area of 1.4 million acres (570,000 ha; 5,700 km^{2}; 2,200 mi^{2}). In descending order of land area the forest is located in parts of Umatilla, Grant, Columbia, Morrow, Wallowa, Union, Garfield, Asotin, Wheeler, and Walla Walla counties. (Columbia, Garfield, Asotin, and Walla Walla counties are in Washington, while the rest are in Oregon.) More than three-quarters of the forest lies in the state of Oregon.

Forest headquarters are located in Pendleton, Oregon. Local ranger district offices are in Heppner and Ukiah in Oregon, as well as in Pomeroy and Walla Walla in Washington.

== Human history ==
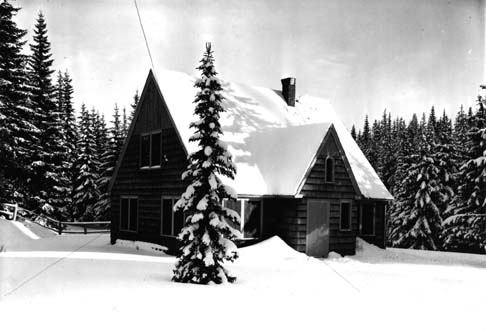
Tollgate Ranger Station (1935).

The Umatilla National Forest takes its name from the Umatilla Indian word meaning "water rippling over sand".

In 1805, explorers Lewis and Clark passed through the area on the Columbia River.

In 1836, Marcus and Narcissa Whitman passed through to establish a mission at Wailatpu near Walla Walla, Washington. Thousands of emigrants later followed the Oregon Trail west, and many remained in the Blue Mountain region.

In 1851, gold was discovered in Oregon, leading to the settlement of the North Fork John Day River area. More than US$10 million in gold and silver were mined (equivalent to $387 million in 2025), and remnants of the era are still visible in the National Forest. Some claims are still being mined.

On July 1, 1908 (118 years ago), the Umatilla National Forest was established from part of Blue Mountains National Forest and all of Heppner National Forest.

On November 5, 1920, Wenaha National Forest was added.

In 2005, the forest was the site of the School Fire, the largest fire in the contiguous United States that year.

In 2025, after a two year investigation, Shane Dee Caldwell, who lived near the forest, was convicted of poaching hundreds of Native American artifacts from illegal archaeological digs within the forest. A total of 522 artifacts were recovered from his house and subsequently restored to custody of the Nez Perce tribe.

== Wildlife ==
Common wildlife in the Umatilla National Forest include moose, elk, bighorn sheep, black bear, mountain goat, mule deer, white-tailed deer, timber wolf, cougar, coyote, badger, Merriam's turkeys, transplanted Rio Grande wild turkeys, blue and ruffed grouse, Franklin's grouse, chinook salmon, coho salmon, steelhead, rainbow trout, brook trout, and lake trout.

== Wilderness ==
More than 20 percent of the Umatilla National Forest is classified as wilderness:

- Wenaha–Tucannon Wilderness, 177,400 acres (71,800 hectares), straddles the border between Oregon and Washington.
- North Fork John Day Wilderness, 121,800 acres (49,300 hectares), is in the southeast section of the National Forest and located partly in neighboring Whitman National Forest.
- North Fork Umatilla Wilderness, 20,200 acres (8,200 hectares), contains the narrow valley of the North Fork Umatilla River, the source of the Umatilla River.

== Vegetation ==
A 1993 Forest Service study estimated that the extent of old growth in the forest was 190,741 acres (77,190 ha).

== Recreation ==
Common recreational activities in the Umatilla National Forest include OHV riding, camping, hiking, fishing, hunting, wildlife watching, skiing, and rafting.

Spout Springs Ski Area in Oregon and Bluewood Ski Area in Washington operate under special use permits within the forest.

Jubilee Lake has the most popular campground in the forest.

== See also ==
- List of national forests of the United States
