= Oregon Route 11 =

State highway in Umatilla County, Oregon, US

Oregon Route 11
- Route 11 highlighted in red

Route information
- Maintained by ODOT
- Length: 34.06 mi (54.81 km)
- Existed: 1932–present
- Component highways: Oregon–Washington Highway No. 8

Major junctions
- South end: I-84 in Pendleton
- US 30 in Pendleton
- North end: SR 125 near Ferndale

Location
- Country: United States
- State: Oregon
- Counties: Umatilla

Highway system
- Oregon Highways; Interstate; US; State; Named; Scenic
← OR 10	→ OR 18

Oregon Route 11 is an Oregon state highway that runs between the city of Pendleton in eastern Oregon, to the Washington border south of Walla Walla, Washington. OR 11 traverses the Oregon–Washington Highway No. 8 of the Oregon state highway system, even though there are numerous other highways crossing the Oregon–Washington border. The route shares a concurrency with U.S. Route 30 along the Pendleton Highway No. 67. It is one of several Oregon state highways to terminate at one of Oregon's borders.

== Route description ==
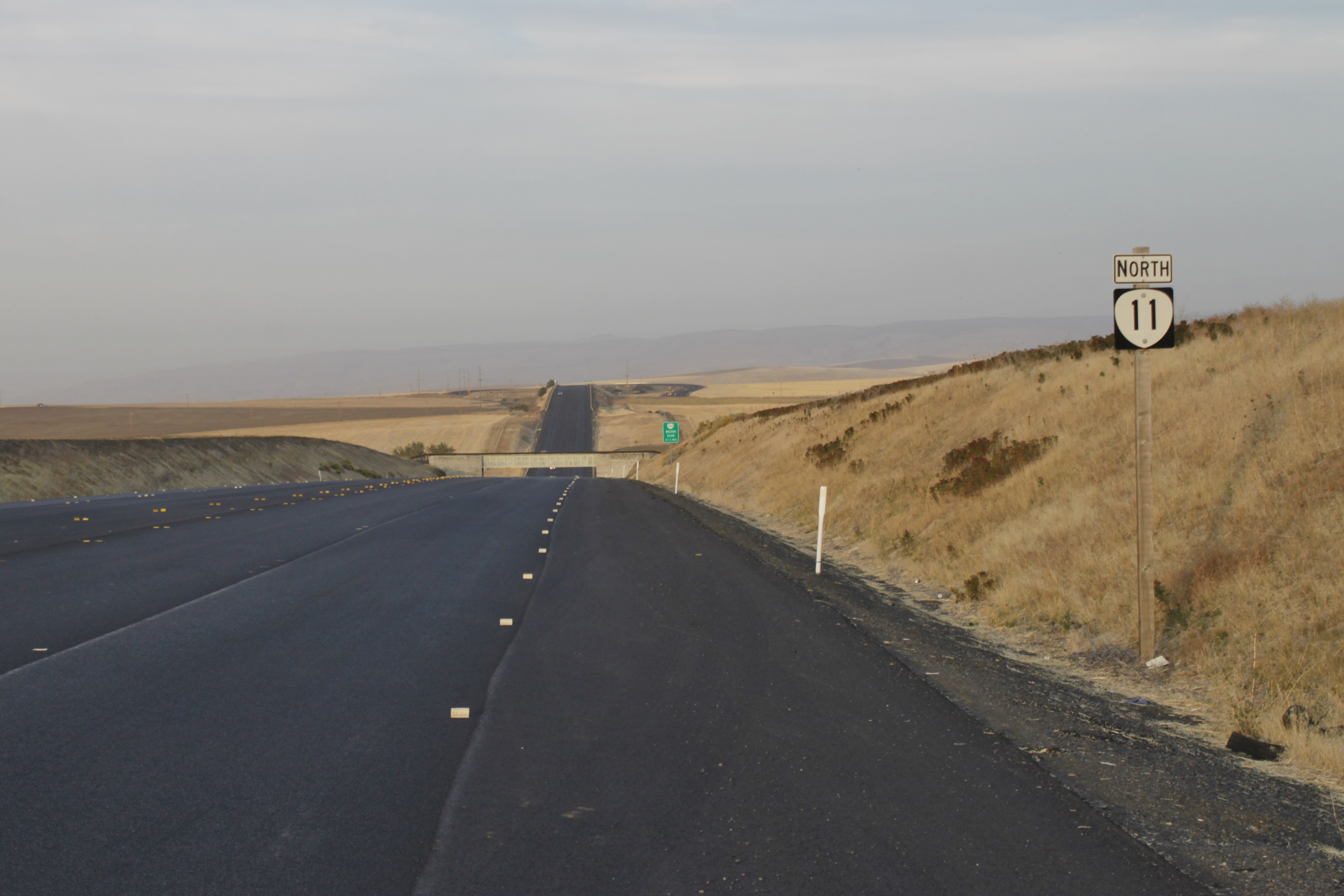
Approaching the junction with OR 204 near Weston

OR 11 begins (at its southern terminus) at a junction with Interstate 84 in Pendleton. While in Pendleton, it overlaps U.S. Route 30 for a short distance, before leaving the city heading in a north-northeasterly direction, along the base of the Blue Mountains, passing near the communities of Havana and Blakeley and through the cities of Adams and Athena.

Approximately 30 miles (48 km) north of Pendleton, OR 11 passes through the city of Milton-Freewater. Just north of Milton-Freewater, OR 11 ends at the Washington state line. The route continues into Washington as State Route 125. SR 125 continues north into Walla Walla.

== History ==
While only 34 miles (55 km) today, OR 11 once ran from the Washington to the California borders. However, in 1935 much of the original route of OR 11 was redesignated as U.S. Route 395, which heads northwest from Pendleton towards the Tri-Cities.

== Major intersections ==
Milepoints are as reported by ODOT and do not necessarily reflect current mileage. Z indicates overlapping mileage due to construction longer than established route, and – indicates negative mileage behind established beginning point. Segments that are locally maintained may be omitted. For routes traversing multiple named state highways, each milepoint is preceded by the corresponding state highway number. The entire route is in Umatilla County.

Location	Milepoint	Destinations	Notes
Pendleton	–1.77	I-84 – Portland, La Grande	Exit 210 on I-84
Pendleton	–0.77	9th Street to US 395 – John Day	
Pendleton	–0.70	US 30 west – City Center	Southern end of concurrency with US 30
Pendleton	0.00	US 30 east to I-84 east – La Grande	Northern end of concurrency with US 30
Pendleton	0.18	Umatilla River	
	4.42	OR 331 to I-84 – Mission, La Grande	
	6.19	OR 335 – Helix	
	17.32	OR 334 – Athena	
	20.41– 20.45	OR 204 – Weston, Elgin	Interchange
	23.11	Blue Mountain Summit, elevation 1,631 feet (497 m)	
Milton-Freewater	31.51– 31.55	OR 339 – Old Town Freewater	Access via East Side Road northbound and via NE 10th Ave southbound
	32.64	OR 332 – Sunnyside, Umapine	
	35.32	SR 125 – Walla Walla	Continuation into Washington
1.000 mi = 1.609 km; 1.000 km = 0.621 mi: Concurrency terminus
