= Oregon Route 335 =

State highway in Umatilla County, Oregon, US

Oregon Route 335
- Route 335 highlighted in red

Route information
- Maintained by ODOT
- Length: 9.79 mi (15.76 km)
- Existed: 2003–present

Major junctions
- South end: OR 11
- OR 334 near Myrick; OR 334 near Helix
- North end: Columbia Street and Main Street in Helix

Location
- Country: United States
- State: Oregon
- County: Umatilla

Highway system
- Oregon Highways; Interstate; US; State; Named; Scenic
← OR 334	→ OR 339

Oregon Route 335 is an Oregon state highway running from Helix to OR 11 near Pendleton. OR 335 is known as the Havana-Helix Highway No. 335 (see Oregon highways and routes). It is 9.79 miles (15.76 km) long and runs north–south, entirely within Umatilla County.

OR 335 was established in 2003 as part of Oregon's project to assign route numbers to highways that previously were not assigned, and, as of October 2020, was unsigned.

== Route description ==
OR 335 begins at the intersection of Columbia and Main Streets in Helix and heads south 2.40 miles (3.86 km) to an intersection with OR 334. OR 334 and OR 335 overlap for 1.13 miles (1.82 km), heading south, after which OR 334 turns west toward Myrick and OR 335 continues south through Midway. OR 335 ends at an intersection with OR 11 4.24 miles (6.82 km) south of Midway near a former railroad station.

== History ==
OR 335 was designated as a secondary state highway in 1936. It ran from the Oregon-Washington Highway (OR 11) along the existing Market Road No. 2 to Helix. A nearby quarry provided basalt for the Oregon State Highway Department's (later the Oregon Department of Transportation (ODOT)) road-building projects.

OR 335 was assigned to the highway in 2003.

Vansycle Road, the continuation of OR 335 beyond Helix, was proposed in the 1950s as an alternative to U.S. Route 730 and Oregon Route 11.

== Major intersections ==
The entire route is in Umatilla County.

Location	mi	km	Destinations	Notes
	0.00	0.00	OR 11 – Milton-Freewater, Pendleton	Southern terminus
	6.26	10.07	OR 334 west – Holdman	South end of concurrency
	7.39	11.89	OR 334 east / Koebcke Road – Athena	North end of concurrency
Helix	9.79	15.76	Columbia Street / Sand Hollow Road, Main Street – Myrick, Vansycle, Holdman	Northern terminus
1.000 mi = 1.609 km; 1.000 km = 0.621 mi
