= Ferndale, Oregon =

Unincorporated community in the state of Oregon, United States

- Unincorporated community
- Location within the state of Oregon
- Coordinates: 45°58′52″N 118°23′51″W
- Country: United States
- State: Oregon
- County: Umatilla
- Elevation: 843 ft (257 m)
- Time zone: UTC-8 (Pacific (PST))
  - Summer (DST): UTC-7 (PDT)
- Area codes: 458 and 541
- GNIS feature ID: 1136284

Ferndale is an unincorporated community in Umatilla County, Oregon, United States. It is near the Oregon–Washington border east of Oregon Route 339 and west of Oregon Route 11 about 4 miles (6 km) north of Milton-Freewater.

Ferndale was once a station on the Walla Walla Valley Railway, which served the local fruit orchards, and the site of a fruit-packing warehouse. The next station south on the line was at Sunnyside. Ferndale Elementary School is part of the Milton-Freewater Unified School District.
