= Oregon Route 334 =

State highway in Umatilla County, Oregon, US

Oregon Route 334
- Route 334 highlighted in red

Route information
- Maintained by ODOT
- Length: 18.12 mi (29.16 km)
- Existed: 2003–present

Major junctions
- West end: OR 37 near Myrick
- OR 335 near Myrick; OR 335 near Helix
- East end: OR 11 in Athena

Location
- Country: United States
- State: Oregon
- County: Umatilla

Highway system
- Oregon Highways; Interstate; US; State; Named; Scenic
← OR 332	→ OR 335

Oregon Route 334 (OR 334) is an Oregon state highway running from OR 37 near Myrick to OR 11 near Athena. OR 334 is known as the Athena-Holdman Highway No. 334 (see Oregon highways and routes). It is 18.12 miles (29.16 km) long and runs east–west, entirely within Umatilla County.

OR 334 was established in 2003 as part of Oregon's project to assign route numbers to highways that previously were not assigned, and, as of October 2020, was unsigned.

== Route description ==
OR 334 begins at an intersection with OR 37 approximately ten miles north of Pendleton and heads east through Myrick. Three miles east of Myrick, OR 334 overlaps OR 335 for 1.13 miles (1.82 km), heading north. After OR 335 turns north toward Helix, OR 334 then continues east through Athena, ending at an intersection with OR 11 approximately one mile east of Athena.

== History ==
OR 334 was assigned to the Athena-Holdman Highway in 2003.

== Major intersections ==
The entire route is in Umatilla County.

Location	mi	km	Destinations	Notes
	0.00	0.00	OR 37 – Holdman, Umatilla, Pendleton	Western terminus
	8.44	13.58	OR 335 south – Pendleton	West end of concurrency
	9.57	15.40	OR 335 north – Helix	East end of concurrency
	18.12	29.16	OR 11 – Milton-Freewater, Pendleton	Eastern terminus
1.000 mi = 1.609 km; 1.000 km = 0.621 mi
