= Cold Springs, Oregon =

Unincorporated community in the state of Oregon, United States

- Unincorporated community
- Location within the state of Oregon
- Coordinates: 45°52′42″N 119°09′56″W
- Country: United States
- State: Oregon
- County: Umatilla
- Elevation: 574 ft (175 m)
- Time zone: UTC-8 (Pacific (PST))
  - Summer (DST): UTC-7 (PDT)
- Area codes: 458 and 541
- GNIS feature ID: 1158171

Cold Springs is an unincorporated community in Umatilla County, Oregon, United States, south of the Columbia River in the Hermiston area. Cold Springs Junction is a populated place and highway junction about 4 miles (6 km) northeast of Cold Springs at the junction of Oregon Route 37 and U.S. Route 730.

The present-day Cold Springs was a station of the Oregon-Washington Railroad & Navigation Company, which is the Union Pacific Railroad today.

One of several geographic features in the area—including Cold Springs Wash, Cold Springs Reservoir and Cold Springs Canyon—that were likely named after a local spring, Cold Springs post office was established in 1880 and ran until 1883. It was in the Middle Fork Cold Springs Canyon west of Myrick and east of the reservoir about 28 miles (45 km) northeast of Cold Springs station. The reservoir was formed in the early 1900s when the wash was dammed to provide storage for water diverted from the Umatilla River for irrigation.

== See also ==
- Cold Springs National Wildlife Refuge
