= Oregon Route 332 =

State highway in Umatilla County, Oregon, US

Oregon Route 332
- Route 332 highlighted in red

Route information
- Maintained by ODOT
- Length: 7.93 mi (12.76 km)
- Existed: 2003–present

Major junctions
- West end: State Line Road near Umapine
- OR 339 near Milton-Freewater
- East end: OR 11 near Milton-Freewater

Location
- Country: United States
- State: Oregon
- County: Umatilla

Highway system
- Oregon Highways; Interstate; US; State; Named; Scenic
← OR 331	→ OR 334

Oregon Route 332 (OR 332) is an Oregon state highway running from the Washington state line near Umapine to OR 11 near Milton-Freewater. OR 332 is known as the Sunnyside-Umapine Highway No. 332 (see Oregon highways and routes). It is approximately eight miles long and runs east–west, entirely within Umatilla County.

OR 332 was established in 2003 as part of Oregon's project to assign route numbers to highways that previously were not assigned.

== Route description ==
OR 332 begins at an intersection with State Line Road on the Washington state line two miles (3 km) north of Umapine and heads south and then east toward Milton-Freewater, passing through Sunnyside. Near Milton-Freewater, OR 332 crosses OR 339 and proceeds east. Approximately one mile north of Milton-Freewater, OR 332 ends at an intersection with OR 11.

== History ==
OR 332 was assigned to the Sunnyside-Umapine Highway in 2003.

== Major intersections ==
The entire route is in Umatilla County.

Location	mi	km	Destinations	Notes
	0.00	0.00	State Line Road – Vansycle, Walla Walla	Washington state line
Sunnyside	7.18	11.56	OR 339 – Milton-Freewater, Washington State Line	
	7.93	12.76	OR 11 – Walla Walla, Milton-Freewater	
1.000 mi = 1.609 km; 1.000 km = 0.621 mi
