= Tollgate, Oregon =

Place in Oregon, United States

- Unincorporated community
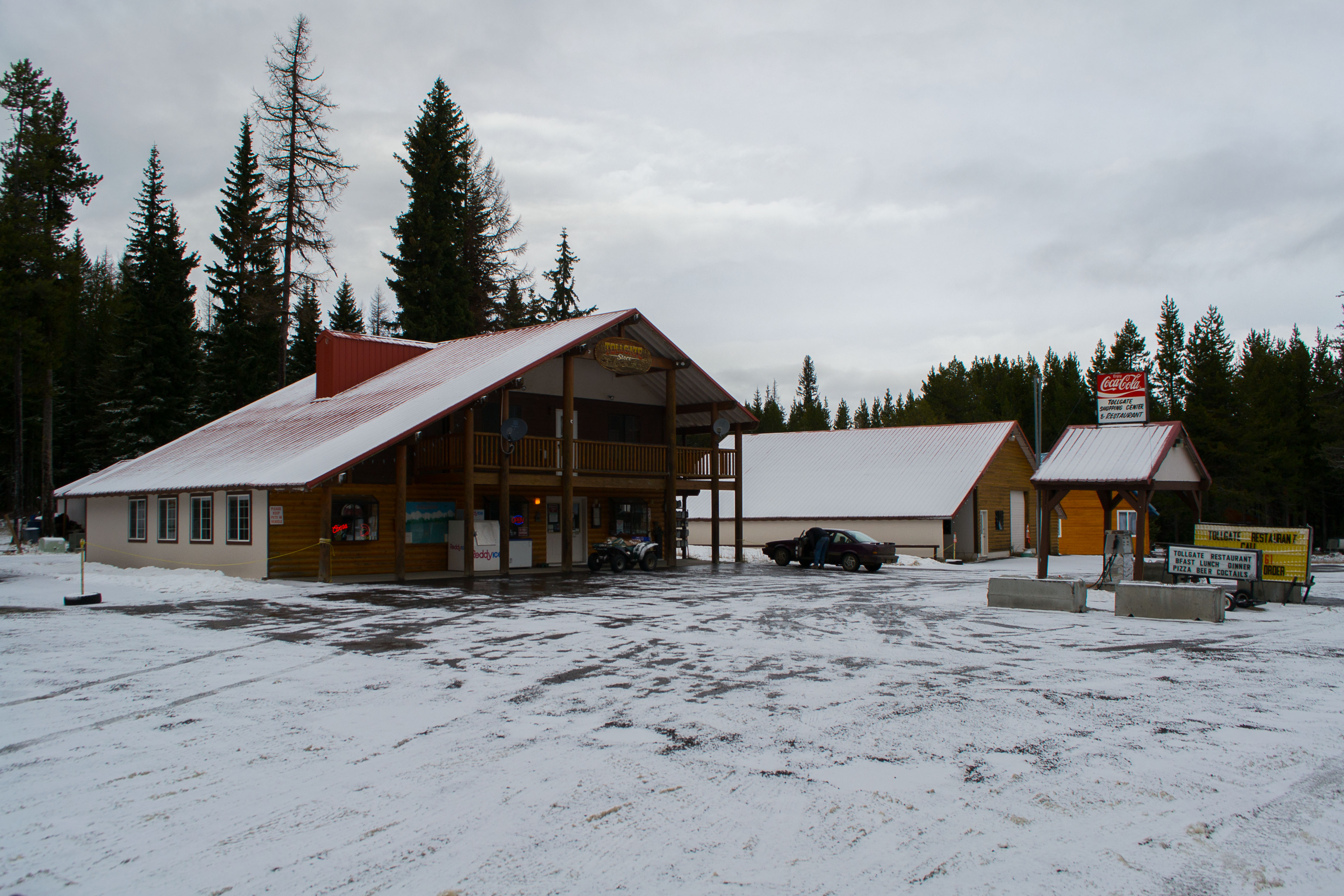
- Downtown Tollgate

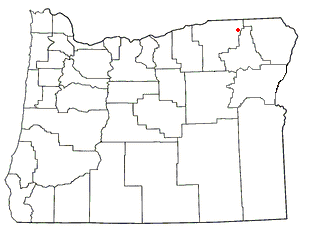
- Location of Tollgate, Oregon
- Coordinates: 45°46′50″N 118°05′34″W
- Country: United States
- State: Oregon
- County: Umatilla
- Elevation: 4,879 ft (1,487 m)
- Time zone: UTC-8 (Pacific (PST))
  - Summer (DST): UTC-7 (PDT)
- ZIP code: 97886
- Area code: 541
- GNIS feature ID: 1116542

Tollgate is an unincorporated community in Umatilla County, Oregon, United States. It lies between Weston and Elgin on Oregon Route 204.

The area was first homesteaded by David J. Woodward. After co-forming the Summerville and Walla Walla Road Co., Woodward purchased land near the headwater of Lookingglass Creek (later dammed in 1922 to create Langdon Lake). A road leading east from the city of Milton and the city of Walla Walla, Washington to the city of Summerville and the Grande Ronde Valley crossed Woodward's property. Woodward installed a toll gate across this portion of the road and charged travelers a fee for access through the gate. The toll road was frequently used as a means to move farm products from Union County to Umatilla County and Walla Walla County.

In 1915 Umatilla County, working with other local counties, became interested in improving the toll road. These counties formed the Blue Mountain Highway Association. Among the group's goals was to gravel the road and abolish the toll. Woodward resisted abolishing the toll and the committee moved to create a new route which bypassed the Woodwards land. In 1922 this new route was completed and called the Weston-Elgin Highway, which later became Highway 204, which still runs by the Langdon Lake.

In 1940 a postoffice was established and would continue serving the community until 1954. Today mail for the Tollgate community is routed through a post office in Weston.

The Spout Springs Ski Area and Andes Prairie, which is the only designated sledding and winter camping area in the Blue Mountains, also are within the community. Langdon Lake has remained a private lake and has limited access to the public.

== Notable residents ==
- Gordon Smith - Former U.S. Senator from Oregon

== Links ==
1. Tollgate trail finders snowmobile club
2. Jubilee Lake and campground (USFS)
