= Earl Greene =

American football player and coach, basketball coach, and college faculty member

Biographical details
- Born: July 4, 1899; Michigan, U.S.
- Died: February 3, 1995 (aged 95); Michigan, U.S.
- Education: Albany (OR); Oregon State; Iowa (1935)

Playing career

Football
- c. 1920: Albion
- 1921: Illinois
- Position: Guard

Coaching career (HC unless noted)

Football
- 1923–1925: Albany (OR)
- 1926–?: McLoughlin HS (OR)
- 1933: Iowa (assistant)
- 1934: Winona State

Basketball
- 1926–?: McLoughlin HS (OR)
- 1934–1935: Winona State

Baseball
- 1927–?: McLoughlin HS (OR)

Track
- c. 1925: Albany (OR)
- 1927–?: McLoughlin HS (OR)

Administrative career (AD unless noted)
- 1925–1926: Albany (OR)
- 1934–1935: Winona State

Earl Lee Blair Greene (July 4, 1899 – February 3, 1995) was an American football, basketball, baseball, and track and field coach. He served as the head football coach at Albany College—now known as Lewis & Clark College—from 1923 to 1925 and Winona State Teachers College—now known as Winona State University in 1934.

== Education and playing career ==
Greene was a member of the University of Illinois football team in 1921, after transferring from Albion College in Michigan.

Greene graduated from Lewis & Clark College, then known as Albany College, in Portland, Oregon in 1924. His, father, Clarence W. Greene, was the president of Albany College.

== Coaching career ==
Greene served as the head football coach at Albany College for three seasons, from 1923 to 1925. He was also the school's athletic director for one year before resigning in 1926 to become a physical education coach and teacher at McLoughlin High School in Milton, Oregon. Greene led his football team at McLoughlin to the eastern Oregon championship in the fall of 1926. He also coached baseball, basketball, and track at McLoughlin.

=== Winona State ===
Greene was named the head football coach at Winona State University, then known as Winona State Teachers College, in Winona, Minnesota in 1934. He also served as the school's head basketball coach for the 1934–35 season, leading the team to a record of 7–9.

== Death ==
Greene died on February 3, 1995.

== Head coaching record ==
=== College football ===
Year	Team	Overall	Conference	Standing	Bowl/playoffs
Albany Pirates (Independent) (1923–1925)
1923	Albany				
1924	Albany				
1925	Albany				
Albany:					
Winona State Warriors (Northern Teachers Athletic Conference) (1934)
1934	Winona State	2–5	2–2	T–3rd	
Winona State:		2–5	2–2		
Total:					
