= Oregon Route 339 =

State highway in Umatilla County, Oregon, US

Oregon Route 339
- Route 339 highlighted in red

Route information
- Maintained by ODOT
- Length: 3.43 mi (5.52 km)
- Existed: 2003–present

Major junctions
- South end: Milton-Freewater city limits
- OR 332 in Sunnyside
- North end: State Line Road near Ferndale

Location
- Country: United States
- State: Oregon
- County: Umatilla

Highway system
- Oregon Highways; Interstate; US; State; Named; Scenic
← OR 335	→ OR 350

Oregon Route 339 (OR 339) is an Oregon state highway running from the Washington state line near Ferndale to Milton-Freewater. OR 339 is known as the Freewater Highway No. 339 (see Oregon highways and routes). It is 3.43 miles (5.52 km) long and runs north–south, entirely within Umatilla County.

OR 339 was established in 2003 as part of Oregon's project to assign route numbers to highways that previously were not assigned.

== Route description ==
OR 339 begins at an intersection with State Line Road approximately one and one half miles north of Ferndale, at the Washington state line, and heads south through Ferndale and Sunnyside. Approximately one-half-mile south of Sunnyside, OR 339 intersects OR 332. OR 339 ends at the Milton-Freewater northern city limit.

== History ==
OR 339 was assigned to the Freewater Highway in 2003.

== Major intersections ==
The entire route is in Umatilla County.

Location	mi	km	Destinations	Notes
Milton-Freewater	3.43	5.52	Begin state maintenance	Continues as Lamb Street
Sunnyside	2.67	4.30	OR 332 / Sunnyside Road – Umapine	
Oregon–Washington state line	0.00	0.00	Stateline Road	Continuation into Washington as Old Milton Highway
1.000 mi = 1.609 km; 1.000 km = 0.621 mi
