= Holdman =

Holdman is a surname. Notable people with the surname include:

- Tom Holdman, (born 1970), American glass artist
- Travis Holdman, American politician
- Warrick Holdman (born 1975), American football player

== See also ==
- Holdman, Oregon, unincorporated community in the United States
