= Oregon Highway 15 =

There is no present signed highway numbered 15 in the U.S. state of Oregon. Oregon Highway 15 may refer to:

- Oregon Route 37, numbered Oregon Route 15 from 1932 to 1934
- McKenzie Highway, unsigned Highway 15
