= Blakeley, Oregon =

Unincorporated community in the state of Oregon, United States

- Unincorporated community
- Location within the state of Oregon
- Coordinates: 45°44′29″N 118°36′15″W
- Country: United States
- State: Oregon
- County: Umatilla
- Elevation: 1,417 ft (432 m)
- Time zone: UTC-8 (Pacific (PST))
  - Summer (DST): UTC-7 (PDT)
- Area codes: 458 and 541
- GNIS feature ID: 1136079
- Coordinates and elevation from Geographic Names Information System

Blakeley is an unincorporated historic community in Umatilla County, Oregon, United States between Pendleton and Milton-Freewater. It is just north of Oregon Route 11 on Wildhorse Creek. Blakeley was once a station on the Union Pacific Railroad. The station was first named "Eastland" after Robert E. Eastland, who received a patent on land nearby in 1880. The name was later changed to honor William M. Blakley (alternatively spelled "Blakeley" and "Blakely"), an Oregon state representative from 1902–1906, and a wheat grower in the area. The elevation is 1417 ft (432 m) above sea level.
