= Spout Springs Ski Area =

Ski area in Oregon, United States

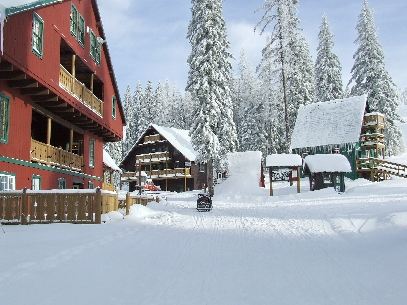
- Main Lodge in mid-December

- Location in Oregon Spout Springs Ski Area (the United States)
- Location: Northeast Oregon, U.S.
- Nearest city: Tollgate, Portland: 250 mi (400 km)
- Coordinates: 45.7550°N 118.0543°W
- Vertical: 530 ft (162 m)
- Top elevation: 5,450 ft (1,661 m)
- Base elevation: 4,920 ft (1,500 m)
- Trails: 17: - 35% easiest: 35% more difficult; 30% most difficult
- Lift system: 2 chairs
- Snowfall: 130 in (330 cm)
- Snowmaking: none
- Night skiing: Yes

Spout Springs Ski Area is a former ski area near Tollgate, Oregon, in the Blue Mountains, within the Umatilla National Forest. The ski area, which opened in the 1940s, offered beginner and intermediate terrain, served by two fixed-grip double chairlifts. It is adjacent to Oregon Route 204, midway between Weston and Elgin.

Spout Springs closed after the 2017–2018 ski season. The USFS had designated the ski area parking lot to be "multiuse" and insisted that snowmobilers be allowed to park in the ski area parking which was not insureable. This USFS policy forced the area to close. The USFS revoked the permit due to non-operation and the matter is currently under litigation. Even though the litigation was ongoing in July 2022, the Umatilla National Forest released a “Request for Expression of Interest” for someone to manage and operate Spout Springs. The Forest Service announced that it received more than a dozen proposals from parties interested in doing so, but as of late 2024 no new operator had been announced, and the ski area remained closed.

== History ==
The Blue Mountain Ski Club was founded in 1938. Its members hailed from southeastern Washington and northeastern Oregon and included faculty and administrators at Whitman College. The club first skied in Tollgate, Oregon (1938-1946) and later moved to the Spout Springs Ski Area in the Umatilla Forest. The club was a non-profit organization that sponsored ski competitions from the 1950s to the 1970s and contributed to the construction of downhill ski infrastructure, including a rope tow (1940s) and T-bar ski lift (1959) at Spout Springs. While club members were active throughout the 1960s and 1970s, interest in the club dwindled by 1980. In 1983, members discussed the legal dissolution of the Blue Mountain Ski Club and donation of its assets to Whitman College to fund the Outdoor Program. On March 8, 1984, the organization was dissolved.

During the CCC days various places were opened up for skiing. As the activity became more popular and skiers progressed, it was learned that the first infrastructure developments were outdated. The activity moved from Woodward Creek to the Ski Bowl. However, this area was found to be too small and too far from the highway for the crowds attracted. A movement was started to move all of the skiing activity to Spout Springs, where all types of skiing would be available and snow conditions would be better. At the Bowl, the courses sloped to the south and west where icy conditions were common. With increased interest in skiing, the Oregon State Highway Commission widened the road at several points, which provides about 5000 feet of end parking for cars. The grading was done in 1947 but the oiling was delayed until 1948. In moving the center of activity to Spout Springs, it was necessary to relocate one tow house and the tow to Spout. The work was done cooperatively by the Blue Mountain Ski Club and the Forest Service. Three tows are now in operation at Spout Springs. The terrain is favorable, as well as the snow conditions for most of the winter. One small warming hut was constructed by the Blue Mountain Ski Club. The size of the hut and other facilities is far from adequate to accommodate the level of demand. A large amount of work was done on ski runs, tows, and tow houses, mostly contributed by skiers. It was expected that the number of recreational visitors at Spout during the winter of 1948 and 1949 would total 15,000 to 20,000.

1956: First Ski Season and there have been large crowds out on the Spout Springs Winter Sports Area, averaging about 1,500 people per weekend. The JC ski school on Saturday is well attended by two hundred juniors. It is not uncommon to see 6 or 7 chartered busses in the parking lots on Saturdays plus 100 cars. We had our first lost skiers on the night of January 29. We started organizing a search plan at 12:30 AM on January 30. The advanced searchers found the men about 7 AM. They had dug into a snow bank for shelter and kept each others feet from freezing by tucking them under each other's armpits. They suffered some frostbite of the feet but no permanent damage. Both were students at Walla Walla College, one of whom came from Austria.

1958 Spout Springs Skiing: There was less snow at Spout Springs than any time in the last decade, during November and December. Desperate skiers were using the high hill successfully, on less than 12 inches of snow. The interesting thing about this is that the number of skier visits was about normal and Ski Club income was normal.

1959 Spout Springs Spout Springs Ski Area is continuing to expand with the moving of one tow to a larger, more desirable location and the installation of a new T-bar lift in place of the two rope lifts in front of the lodge. These new additions should handle the anticipated increase of skiers this year. Additional tows and increased skiing areas are planned for future development with a continual increase in winter sports use of the Spout springs ski area will be guaranteed with new facilities available and improved skiing areas. A new ski venture will be started by the organization of a ski club in and around Pomeroy, Washington. They plan to install a small rope tow near Pataha Creek on the forest. Limited use is expected this winter.

1959 Spout Springs The Spout Springs Ski Area special use permit was transferred from the Blue Mountain Ski Club to the Spout Springs Lodge, Inc. This marked the end of 25 years of various ski area operations by the Blue Mountain Ski Club. The ski business was getting to be more than a volunteer organization could handle. The High and El tows were removed. They had been judged unsafe for some time because of the necessity of uphill sheaves. A new Hall t-bar was installed from in front of the ski lodge to the top of the hill at Spout Springs lookout. The El tow was moved to the new instruction area that has been in the process of being cleared for the last three years.

1961 Spout Springs Our Spout Springs Ski Area has continued to receive increased use. This is due to many factors: its location, the increased interest in winter sports as more people learn to ski and the increased amount of leisure time. Furthermore, the size of the skiing area has been increased and a “T” bar lift has been installed. A new ski venture is being started by the Baldy Butte Ski Club. This club is developing a ski area at Arbuckle Mountain near Heppner, Oregon. Limited use is expected this winter.

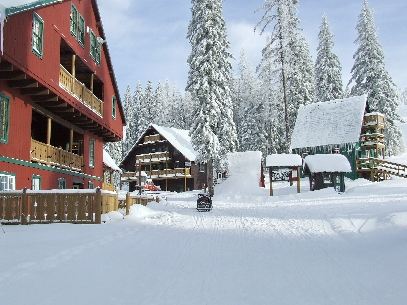
Base Camp Area

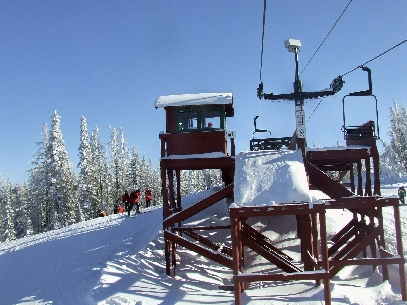
Unloading Terminal of big chair

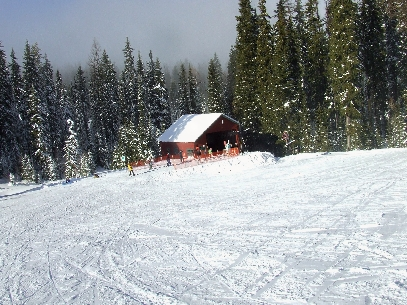
Loading terminal of small chair (echo) at Spout Springs Ski Area

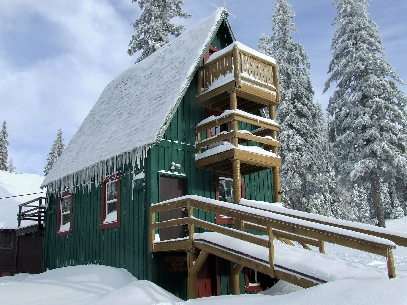
Ski Patrol building

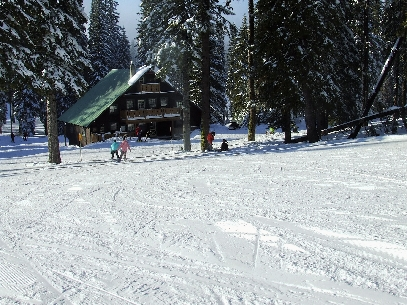
Skiing towards the rental shop off High T

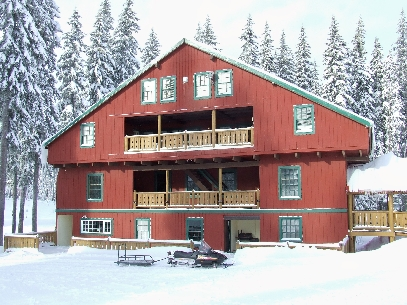
Main Lodge

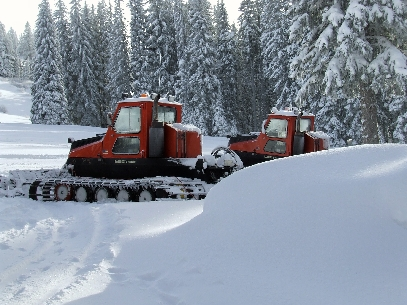
Grooming equipment
