= Oregon Route 204 =

State highway in northeastern Oregon, US

Oregon Route 204
- Route 204 highlighted in red

Route information
- Maintained by ODOT
- Length: 41.89 mi (67.42 km)

Major junctions
- West end: OR 11 in Weston
- East end: OR 82 in Elgin

Location
- Country: United States
- State: Oregon
- Counties: Umatilla, Union

Highway system
- Oregon Highways; Interstate; US; State; Named; Scenic
← OR 203	→ I-205

Oregon Route 204 (OR 204) is an Oregon state highway running from OR 11 in Weston to OR 82 in Elgin. OR 204 is known as the Weston-Elgin Highway No. 330 (see Oregon highways and routes). It is 41.89 miles (67.42 km) long and runs east–west.

== Route description ==
OR 204 begins at an intersection with OR 11 at Weston and heads east to Tollgate. At Tollgate, it curves southward until shortly before Elgin, where it turns east and terminates at an intersection with OR 82.

The highway serves the Spout Springs Ski Area, near Tollgate.

== History ==
The Weston-Elgin Highway was constructed between 1915 and 1938 to replace lower-quality private roads that had previously connected the two cities.

== Major intersections ==
Milepoints are as reported by ODOT and do not necessarily reflect current mileage. Z indicates overlapping mileage due to construction longer than established route, and – indicates negative mileage behind established beginning point. Segments that are locally maintained may be omitted. For routes traversing multiple named state highways, each milepoint is preceded by the corresponding state highway number.

County	Location	Milepoint	Destinations	Notes
Umatilla	Weston	330 -1.34	OR 11	Western terminus
Union	Elgin	330 40.84	OR 82	Eastern terminus
1.000 mi = 1.609 km; 1.000 km = 0.621 mi
