= Oregon Route 331 =

State highway in Umatilla County, Oregon, US

Oregon Route 331
- Route 331 highlighted in red

Route information
- Maintained by ODOT
- Length: 4.84 mi (7.79 km)
- Existed: 2003–present

Major junctions
- South end: I-84 / US 30 near Mission
- North end: OR 11 near Mission

Location
- Country: United States
- State: Oregon
- County: Umatilla

Highway system
- Oregon Highways; Interstate; US; State; Named; Scenic
← OR 293	→ OR 332

Oregon Route 331 (OR 331) is a short state highway in Umatilla County, Oregon. The highway runs 5 miles (8 km) entirely on the Umatilla Indian Reservation from Interstate 84 to OR 11 near Mission. OR 331 is known as the Umatilla Mission Highway No. 331 (see Oregon highways and routes).

OR 331 was established in 2003 as part of Oregon's project to assign route numbers to highways that previously were not assigned.

== Route description ==
OR 331 begins at an interchange with Interstate 84 and U.S. Route 30 on the Umatilla Indian Reservation. The highway travels north, passing the Wildhorse Resort & Casino and the tribal headquarters to the center of Mission. The road then crosses a railroad and the Umatilla River before ascending up to a plateau formed by the river and Wildhorse Creek. OR 331 terminates at an intersection with OR 11, approximately 4 miles (6.4 km) northeast of Pendleton.

== History ==
OR 331 was assigned to the Umatilla Mission Highway in 2003.

== Major intersections ==
The entire route is in Umatilla County.

Location	mi	km	Destinations	Notes
Mission	0.00	0.00	I-84 / US 30 – Pendleton, La Grande, McKay Creek	Continues as Market Road
	4.84	7.79	OR 11 – Pendleton, Milton-Freewater	
1.000 mi = 1.609 km; 1.000 km = 0.621 mi
