= Langdon Lake =

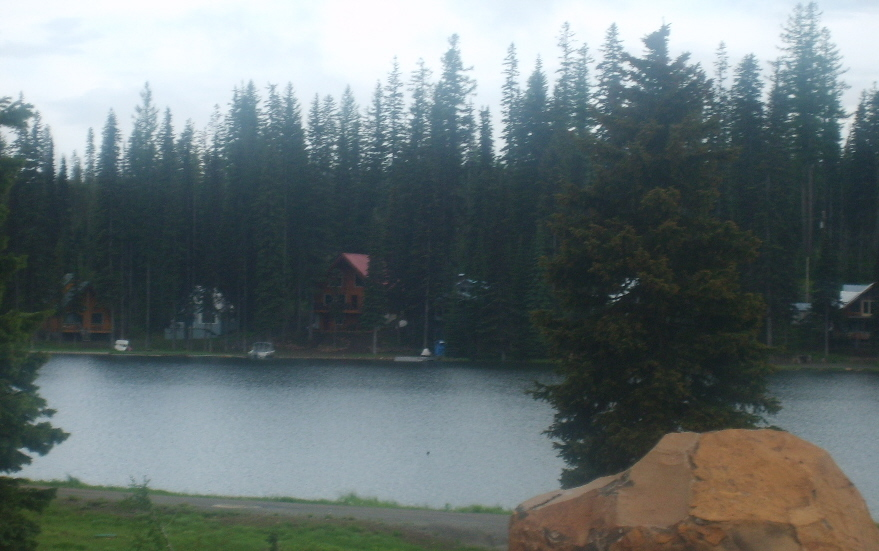
- Langdon Lake with part of Tollgate on the far bank.

- Location within Oregon Location within the United States
- Location: Umatilla National Forest, Umatilla County, Oregon, US
- Coordinates: 45.77819°N 118.08606°W
- Type: Reservoir
- Primary inflows: Morning Creek
- Primary outflows: Lookingglass Creek
- Basin countries: United States
- Surface elevation: 4,902 ft (1,494 m)
- Settlements: Tollgate

Langdon Lake is reservoir located in the Umatilla National Forest of Northeastern Oregon, United States. It is an impoundment of Morning Creek, and the source of Lookingglass Creek, a tributary of the Grande Ronde River.

Surrounding the lake is the small community of Tollgate. The lake is privately owned but a campground is nearby.

== See also ==
- List of lakes in Oregon
