= 1936 State Line earthquake =

Earthquake in Washington and Oregon

- Location within Oregon
- UTC time: 1936-07-16 07:08
- ISC event: 903747
- USGS-ANSS: ComCat
- Local date: July 15, 1936
- Local time: 23:08
- Duration: 15 seconds
- Magnitude: M_{L} 5.8
- Depth: 5 km
- Epicenter: 45.992°N 118.496°W
- Areas affected: Pacific Northwest
- Total damage: $100,000 (1936) $1.78 million (2018)
- Max. intensity: MMI VII (Very strong)

The 1936 State Line earthquake (also referred to as the 1936 Milton-Freewater earthquake) struck at 23:08 Pacific time on July 15, 1936. The earthquake had an estimated magnitude of 5.8 and a maximum Mercalli intensity of VII (Very strong). The epicenter was near the Oregon/Washington state line approximately 6 miles (9.7 km) northwest of Milton-Freewater, Oregon and southwest of Walla Walla, Washington and was felt throughout the Pacific Northwest, including as far away as Bonners Ferry, Idaho near the Canadian border and by seismographs as far away as San Diego, California.

== Geology ==
Larger earthquakes like the 1936 State Line earthquake are not uncommon along the Olympic–Wallowa Lineament, a series of faults stretching from Port Angeles, Washington to the Wallowa Mountains in northeast Oregon. Another earthquake estimated near a magnitude 6 struck the Walla Walla valley in 1882. The earthquake occurred in the Touchet Ridge, a spur leading west off the Blue Mountains that is known as the Horse Heaven Hills west of the Wallula Gap. There is both the old fault along the ridge as well as a newer fault leading from the ridge into the valley.

To the north of the earthquake is the Hite Fault, which lies approximately parallel to the west slopes of the Blue Mountains in Walla Walla County. The Hite Fault is thought to be the boundary between the more stable North American craton to the east and accreted material to the west. While there is no evidence of a Quaternary earthquake event along the Hite Fault, the USGS and several Washington state agencies have run scenarios regarding a future earthquake on the fault.

There have been 66 earthquakes felt in the area since 1936. Most of these have had a magnitude below 4, though one event in November 1991 was 4.3.

== Earthquake ==
The ground near Milton-Freewater exhibited cracks over an area that was 1,500 feet (460 m) long by up to 100 feet (30 m), one of which being 300 feet (91 m) long and 6 feet (1.8 m) wide in places. Near Umapine there were cracks in the ground up to 6 inches (15 cm) wide that had water flowing out of them, demonstrating soil liquefaction. Some cracks were 8 feet (2.4 m) deep. Residents in Umapine reported being woken during the night.

Wells in Milton-Freewater saw an increase in water level and a creek near a town, which had previously run dry, began flowing immediately after the earthquake. Observers in Walla Walla noted rumbling noises immediately preceding the first shocks. At one point the ground dropped by 2.4 meters (7 ft 10 in). About 70% of headstones at a nearby cemetery were found to have been rotated clockwise.

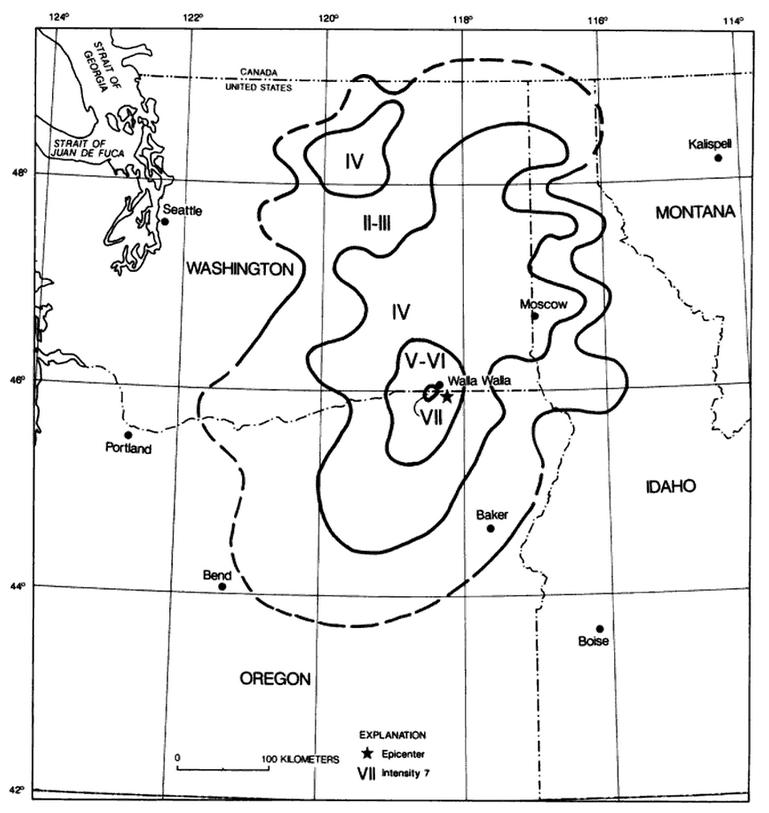
Isoseismal map for the 1936 State Line earthquake

Two small foreshocks were recorded in the three hours before the mainshock.

=== Damage ===
Severe damage was widespread throughout Milton-Freewater and Walla Walla. In Athena, people were forced to evacuate their homes due to large cracks found within their walls. Rocks were reported to have wandered into some intersections and two freight cars were shaken off the tracks at Blue Mountain Station in Dayton.

The shaking was reported as being strongest near State Line. Very strong shaking occurred in Milton-Freewater, breaking windows and collapsing chimneys that had been built longer than ten years previous to the earthquake. Up to $3,000 ($53,000 in 2018) in damage was done to canned goods as well as $8,500 ($151,000 in 2018) in damage to school buildings. A new home 4 miles (6.4 km) west of town was nearly destroyed, and extensive damage was dealt with two cement homes that had been built around 1916 about 7 miles (11 km) west of town. In Umapine a handful of homes were badly damaged. The grade school and high school, which were joined, were found to be separated by 3 inches (7.6 cm).

Chimneys on roofs collapsed in numerous locations, as far away as Waitsburg. Pendulum clocks stopped in Umatilla and plaster was found to have been cracked in Prosser.

=== Aftershocks ===
Over 50 aftershocks were recorded intermittently until mid-November 1936. Several dozen were felt the night of the event in the immediate area, with only three of them reaching to Hermiston. These earthquakes occurred in both Washington and Oregon, owing to the close proximity of the mainshock to the state line. Aftershocks measuring IV on the Mercalli scale were recorded in August, with the ones that struck in November being measured as III.

== See also ==
- List of earthquakes in 1936
- List of earthquakes in the United States
