= McNary, Oregon =

Unincorporated community in the state of Oregon, United States

- Unincorporated community
- Location within Oregon Location within the United States
- Coordinates: 45°55′09″N 119°17′21″W
- Country: United States
- State: Oregon
- County: Umatilla
- Elevation: 482 ft (147 m)
- Time zone: UTC-8 (Pacific (PST))
  - Summer (DST): UTC-7 (PDT)
- ZIP code: 97882
- Area codes: 458 and 541
- GNIS feature ID: 1136529

McNary is an unincorporated community in Umatilla County, Oregon, United States. It is located on U.S. Route 730, near its junctions with U.S. Route 395 and Interstate 82. McNary was named for former U.S. senator from Oregon Charles L. McNary. Its post office was established on September 1, 1949.

== Climate ==
According to the Köppen climate classification, McNary has a semiarid climate, BSk on climate maps.
