= Helix School =

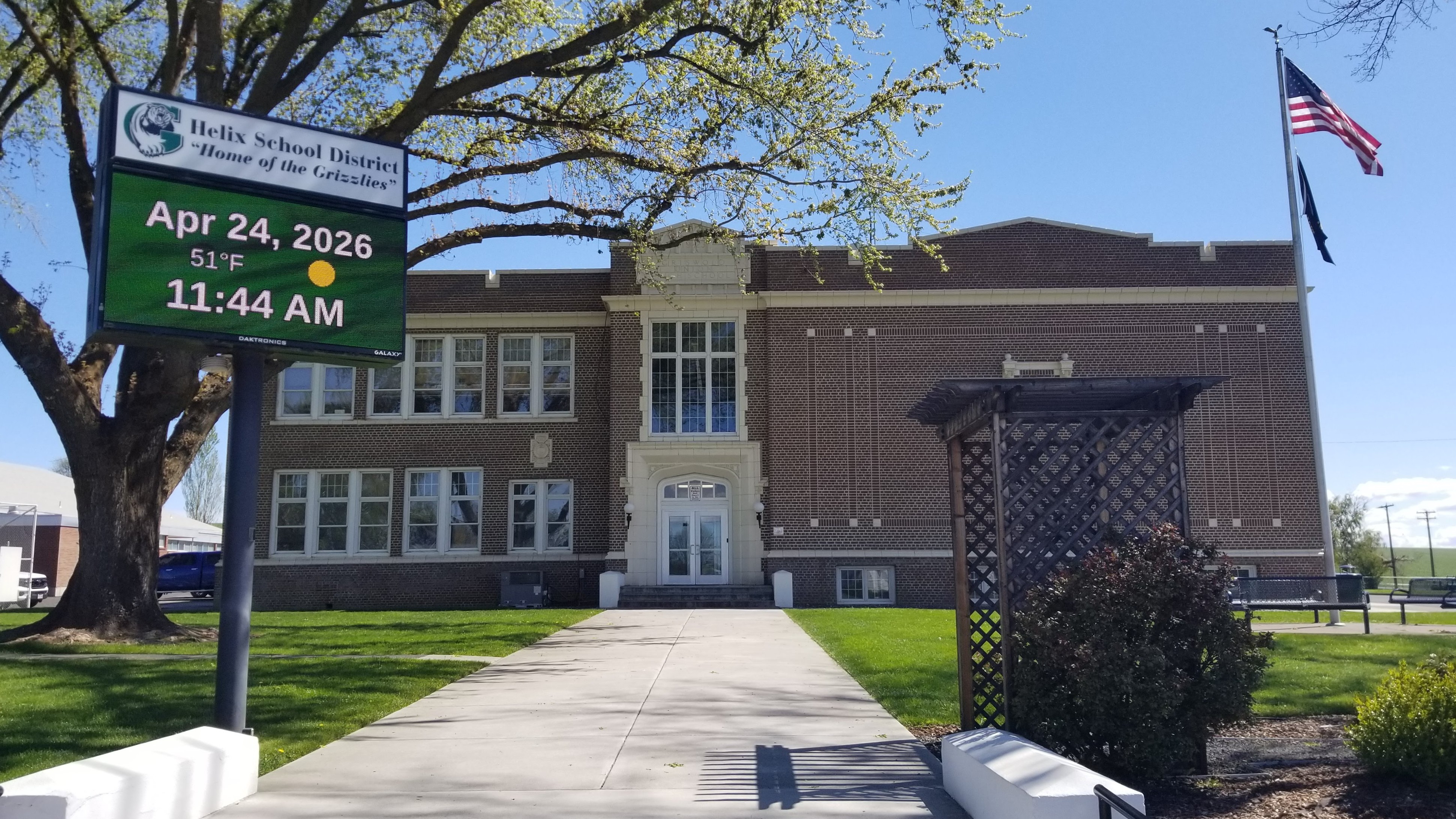

Location
- 120 Main; Helix, (Umatilla County), Oregon 97835; United States
- Coordinates: 45.850828°N 118.653792°W

Information
- Type: Public
- School district: Helix School District
- Principal: Darrick Cope
- Grades: K-12
- Enrollment: 155
- Colors: Kelly green, white, and black
- Athletics conference: OSAA Old Oregon League
- Mascot: Grizzly
- Website: helix.k12.or.us

Helix School is a public high school in Helix, Oregon, United States.

== Academics ==
In 2008, 91% of the school's seniors received a high school diploma. Of 11 students, 10 graduated, none dropped out, and one was still in high school the following year.

== See also ==
- List of high schools in Oregon
