= Sunnyside, Umatilla County, Oregon =

Unincorporated community in the state of Oregon, United States

Sunnyside, Oregon
- Unincorporated community
- Location within the state of Oregon
- Coordinates: 45°57′44″N 118°24′08″W
- Country: United States
- State: Oregon
- County: Umatilla
- Elevation: 912 ft (278 m)
- Time zone: UTC-8 (Pacific (PST))
  - Summer (DST): UTC-7 (PDT)
- Area codes: 458 and 541
- GNIS feature ID: 1136801

Sunnyside is an unincorporated community in Umatilla County, Oregon, United States. It is about 3 miles (5 km) north of Milton-Freewater, at the intersection of Oregon Route 332, which is also known as the Sunnyside-Umapine Highway, and Oregon Route 339. Sunnyside was once a station on the Walla Walla Valley Railway, which served the local fruit orchards, and the site of a Nebraska Bridge Supply and Lumber Co. planing mill from 1958 to 1963. Inland Fir Company also had a sawmill.
