= U.S. Route 730 =

Highway in Oregon and Washington

U.S. Route 730
- Map of Washington and Oregon with US 730 highlighted in red, and US 730 Spur in blue

Route information
- Auxiliary route of US 30
- Maintained by ODOT and WSDOT
- Length: 41.78 mi (Note: Total mileage is a summation of the state mileages.) (67.24 km)
- Existed: November 11, 1926–present
- Tourist routes: Lewis and Clark Trail

Major junctions
- West end: I-84 / US 30 near Boardman, OR
- I-82 / US 395 in Umatilla, OR
- East end: US 12 near Wallula, WA

Location
- Country: United States
- States: Oregon, Washington
- Counties: OR: Morrow, Umatilla; WA: Walla Walla

Highway system
- United States Numbered Highway System; List; Special; Divided
- Oregon Highways; Interstate; US; State; Named; Scenic
- State highways in Washington; Interstate; US; State; Scenic; Pre-1964; 1964 renumbering; Former
← OR 569	OR	→ OR 3
← SR 706	WA	→ SR 821

U.S. Route 730 (US 730) is an east–west United States Numbered Highway, of which all but 6.08 miles of its 41.78 miles (9.78 of 67.24 km) are within the state of Oregon. The highway starts in rural Morrow County in Eastern Oregon at an interchange with Interstate 84 (I-84) and US 30, located east of the city of Boardman. US 730 travels east along the Columbia River as a continuation of Columbia River Highway No. 2 into Umatilla County, intersecting I-82 and US 395 in the city of Umatilla. US 730 and US 395 form a short concurrency within the city before the highways part, and US 730 continues northeast into Washington. The highway travels through rural Walla Walla County and ends at an intersection with US 12 south of Wallula.

US 730 was created with the original US Highway System on November 11, 1926, traveling on the existing Columbia River Highway, established in 1917, from US 30 in Umatilla to US 410 south of Wallula. The Washington section of US 730 was added to the state highway system in 1923 as a branch of State Road 3, later becoming a branch of Primary State Highway 3 (PSH 3) in 1937. The highway was concurrent with US 395 from 1937 until 1985, traveling from Cold Springs Junction to US 410. US 30 was moved to a new route bypassing Umatilla and Irrigon in 1946, allowing for US 730 to be extended southwest to Boardman, later to an interchange with I-84.

== Route description ==
US 730 runs 41.78 miles (67.24 km) in Oregon and Washington and is listed as part of the National Highway System, a system of roads important to the nation's economy, defense and mobility, from its western terminus at I-84 east of Boardman to the end of its concurrency with US 395 in Umatilla. As a state highway in both states, the roadway is maintained by the Oregon Department of Transportation (ODOT) and Washington State Department of Transportation (WSDOT). US 730 has the highest designation of any United States Numbered Highway, or U.S. Route, and is the shortest existing highway in the system. The highway is defined by the Washington State Legislature as SR 730, part of the Revised Code of Washington as §47.17.821.

=== Oregon ===
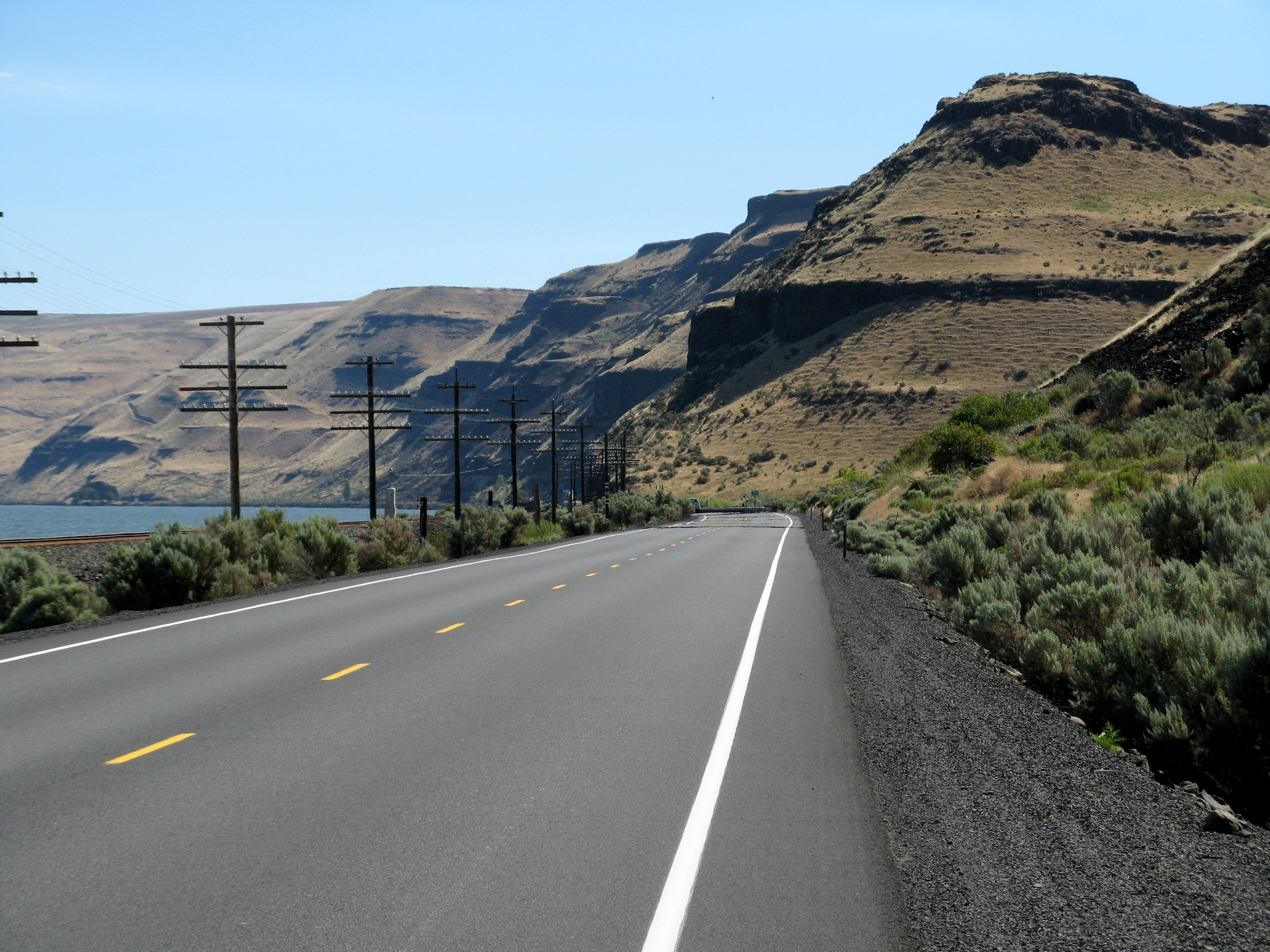
Looking east on US 730 as it travels along Lake Wallula in Oregon, approaching the state border with Washington

US 730 begins at a partial cloverleaf interchange with I-84 and US 30 at Boardman Junction, located east of the city of Boardman in Morrow County. The highway, a continuation of Columbia River Highway No. 2, travels northeast across a Union Pacific rail line and passes the Umatilla National Wildlife Refuge on the Columbia River before reaching the city of Irrigon. From Irrigon, US 730 continues northeast along the Columbia River into Umatilla County and becomes 6th Street in the city of Umatilla. The highway intersects I-82 and US 395 in a diamond interchange and forms a short concurrency with US 395. US 730 continues east through the unincorporated community of McNary and the northern terminus of Oregon Route 207 (OR 207) in rural Umatilla County. The highway turns northeastward along Lake Wallula and intersects OR 37 at Cold Springs Junction, providing connections north to the Warehouse Beach Recreation Area and Hat Rock State Park on the Columbia River and south to the city of Pendleton. US 730 heads into Washington, traveling between a Union Pacific rail line and the canyon walls of the Columbia River Gorge. An ODOT survey measuring traffic volume conducted in 2011 on US 730 calculated that the busiest section of the highway in Oregon was at its interchange with I-82, serving 11,800 vehicles, on average, while the least busy section of the highway was at the Washington state line, serving 2,500 vehicles.

=== Washington ===
US 730 continues north from Oregon along Lake Wallula and around Clover Hill, reaching Wallula Junction in Walla Walla County. The highway intersects its spur route and turns east towards its eastern terminus at US 12 south of the community of Wallula. In 2012, WSDOT calculated that the Washington section of US 730 served between 1,500 and 2,400 vehicles per day, on average.

== History ==
The highway that became US 730 within Oregon has been designated by the Oregon State Highway Commission as the easternmost segment of Columbia River Highway No. 2 since November 27, 1917, created as part of the initial named state highway system. The segment of US 730 within Washington was added to the state highway system in 1923 as a branch of State Road 3 and kept its designation as a branch of PSH 3 during the creation of the primary and secondary highway system in 1937. The United States Numbered Highway System was adopted on November 11, 1926, by the American Association of State Highway Officials (AASHO) and included US 730, traveling northeast along the Columbia River from US 30 in Umatilla to US 410 south of Wallula. The highway was originally planned to be numbered as US 420, but was changed after US 30 was substituted in place of US 20 along the Columbia River. US 395 was extended south from Spokane, Washington, to San Diego, California, in 1937, becoming concurrent with US 730 between Cold Springs Junction and its eastern terminus at US 410 south of Wallula.

US 30 was moved to a new section of the Old Oregon Trail Highway No. 6, bypassing the cities of Irrigon and Umatilla, on November 25, 1946. US 730 was subsequently extended west to a new junction with US 30 and later relocated uphill due to the construction of the John Day Dam. The highway's western terminus was moved farther south to an interchange with I-80N in 1967. During the westward extension of US 12 from Idaho into Washington, the Oregon state government suggested to AASHO a route that included the entirety of US 730 in 1962, while Washington state suggested routing US 12 over US 410 and State Route 12 (SR 12) to Vancouver, Washington. AASHO approved the extension of US 12 into Washington on June 20, 1967, routing it along US 410 and SR 14 to its present terminus in Aberdeen. US 395 was re-aligned to a concurrency with I-82 in 1985, crossing the Columbia River on the Umatilla Bridge and having a shorter concurrency with US 730. The old route of US 395 from Cold Springs Junction to Pendleton, part of Pendleton-Cold Springs Highway No. 236, became Oregon Route 37.

The highway's eastern terminus in Wallula is planned to be moved further north to a new interchange with US 12 after the completion of the Burbank–Walla Walla divided highway in the 2020s.

== Major intersections ==
State	County	Location	mi (Note: Milepost numbers reset at the Oregon–Washington state line crossing.)	km	Destinations	Notes
Oregon	Morrow		0.00– 0.63	0.00– 1.01	I-84 / US 30 / Lewis and Clark Trail – Boardman, Pendleton, Portland	Interchange; western terminus; I-84 exit 168
Oregon	Umatilla	Umatilla	16.50– 16.59	26.55– 26.70	I-82 / US 395 north to I-84 – Kennewick, Spokane, Pendleton, Portland	Western end of US 395 concurrency; I-82 exit 1; interchange
Oregon	Umatilla	Umatilla	17.29	27.83	US 395 south to I-84 east – Hermiston, Pendleton, McNary Dam	Eastern end of US 395 concurrency
Oregon	Umatilla		23.76	38.24	OR 207 south – Hermiston, Heppner	Northern terminus of OR 207
Oregon	Umatilla	Cold Springs Junction	25.88	41.65	OR 37 south – Holdman, Pendleton, Warehouse Beach Recreation Area	Northern terminus of OR 37
			35.70 0.00	57.45 0.00	Oregon–Washington state line	
Washington	Walla Walla		5.82	9.37	US 730 Spur north to US 12 west – Pasco	Southern terminus of US 730 Spur
Washington	Walla Walla		6.08	9.78	US 12 / Lewis and Clark Trail – Pasco, Walla Walla	Eastern terminus
1.000 mi = 1.609 km; 1.000 km = 0.621 mi: Concurrency terminus

== Spur route ==
U.S. Route 730 Spur
- Location: Wallula, Washington
- Length: 0.30 mi (480 m)

U.S. Route 730 Spur (US 730 Spur) is a 0.30-mile-long (0.48 km) spur route in rural Walla Walla County, Washington, that connects it to US 12 westbound towards Wallula, while US 730 is directed towards eastbound US 12 towards the city of Walla Walla. WSDOT included the road in its annual traffic survey in 2012 and calculated that 1,300 vehicles used the spur route.
