= McLoughlin High School =

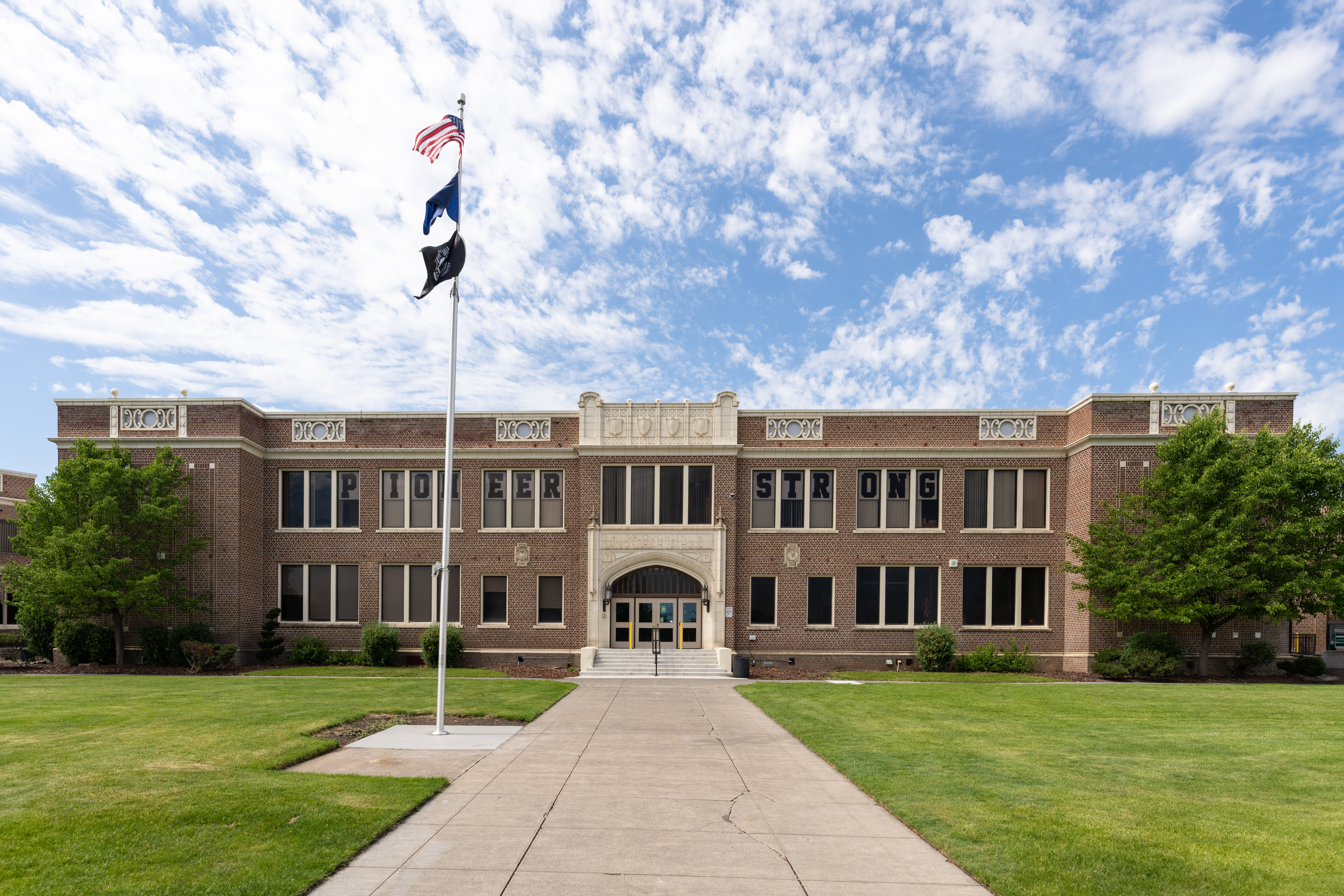
- McLoughlin High School in Milton-Freewater

Location
- 120 S. Main St. Milton-Freewater, (Umatilla County), Oregon 97862; United States; 45.935555°N 118.391325°W

Information
- Established: 1921
- School district: Milton-Freewater Unified School District
- Superintendent: Aaron Duff
- Principal: Mario Uribe Saldaña
- Grades: 9-12
- Enrollment: 460 (2023-2024)
- Colors: Crimson and black
- Athletics conference: OSAA Eastern Oregon League 3A
- Mascot: Pioneers
- Website: http://machi.miltfree.k12.or.us/

McLoughlin High School (formerly McLoughlin Union High School), known as Mac-Hi, is a public high school in Milton-Freewater, Oregon, United States. It is part of Milton-Freewater Unified School District.

It is named after John McLoughlin, a prominent 19th century trader, for his contributions to the state of Oregon.

== History ==
Milton-Freewater's first school was founded in 1872. In 1879 a four-room school was constructed and later expanded in 1909 with the construction of Central School (now Central Middle School). This building housed the town's high school until 1922 when the construction of McLoughlin Union High School was completed. The red and white brick structure, built in 1921 to 1922, originally consisted of three wings housing eight classrooms, a library, study hall, science labs, a 1,100-seat auditorium, an industrial arts wing, and a gymnasium. Over 100 years later, the remodeled building continues daily operations in an expanded campus. It is supplemented with five additional buildings, including a dedicated gymnasium and industrial arts center.

In 1922, the school began operation with 231 students and 12 teachers. By 2023, it served approximately 520 students with a staff of 29 teachers and 13 support staff.

== Notable alumni ==
- W. Michael Gillette – justice of the Oregon Supreme Court from 1986 until 2010
- Mike Hewitt⁣ – member of the Washington State Senate from 2001 to 2017

== Gallery ==
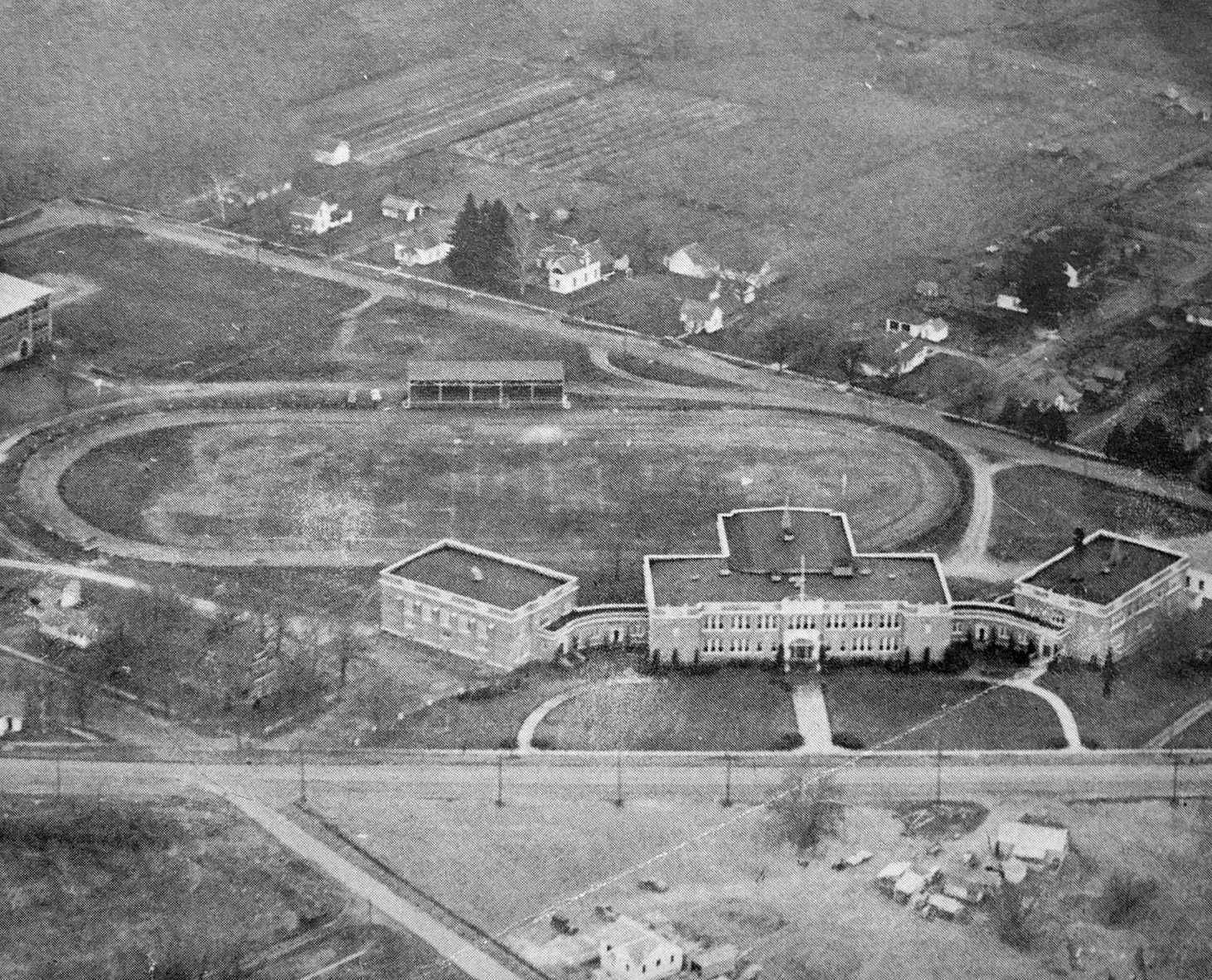
Aerial view of Mac-Hi as it appeared in the 1948 yearbook.

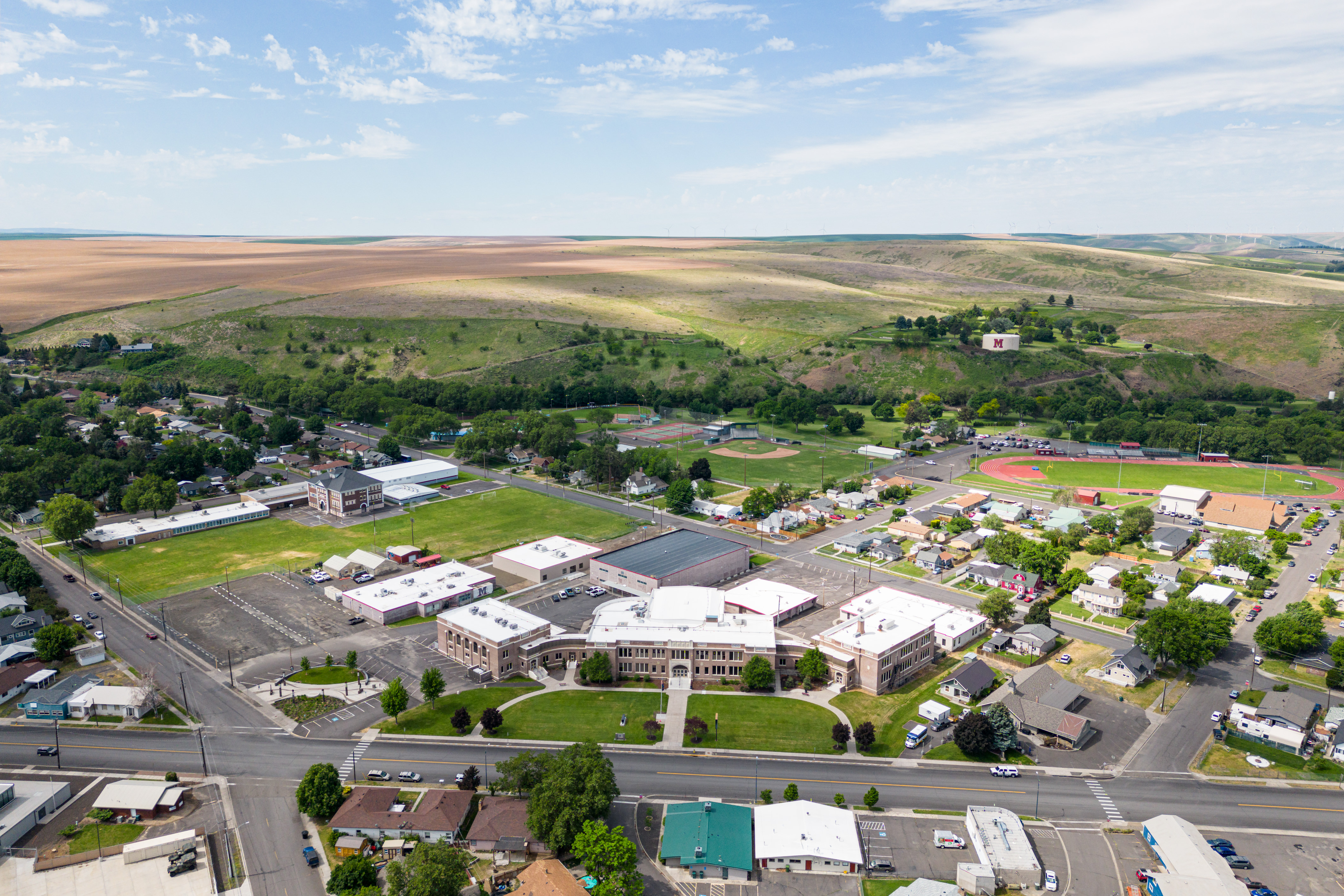
Mac-Hi and surrounding area as it appeared in May 2023. The 1909 Central School building that originally housed the high school is in the middle left.

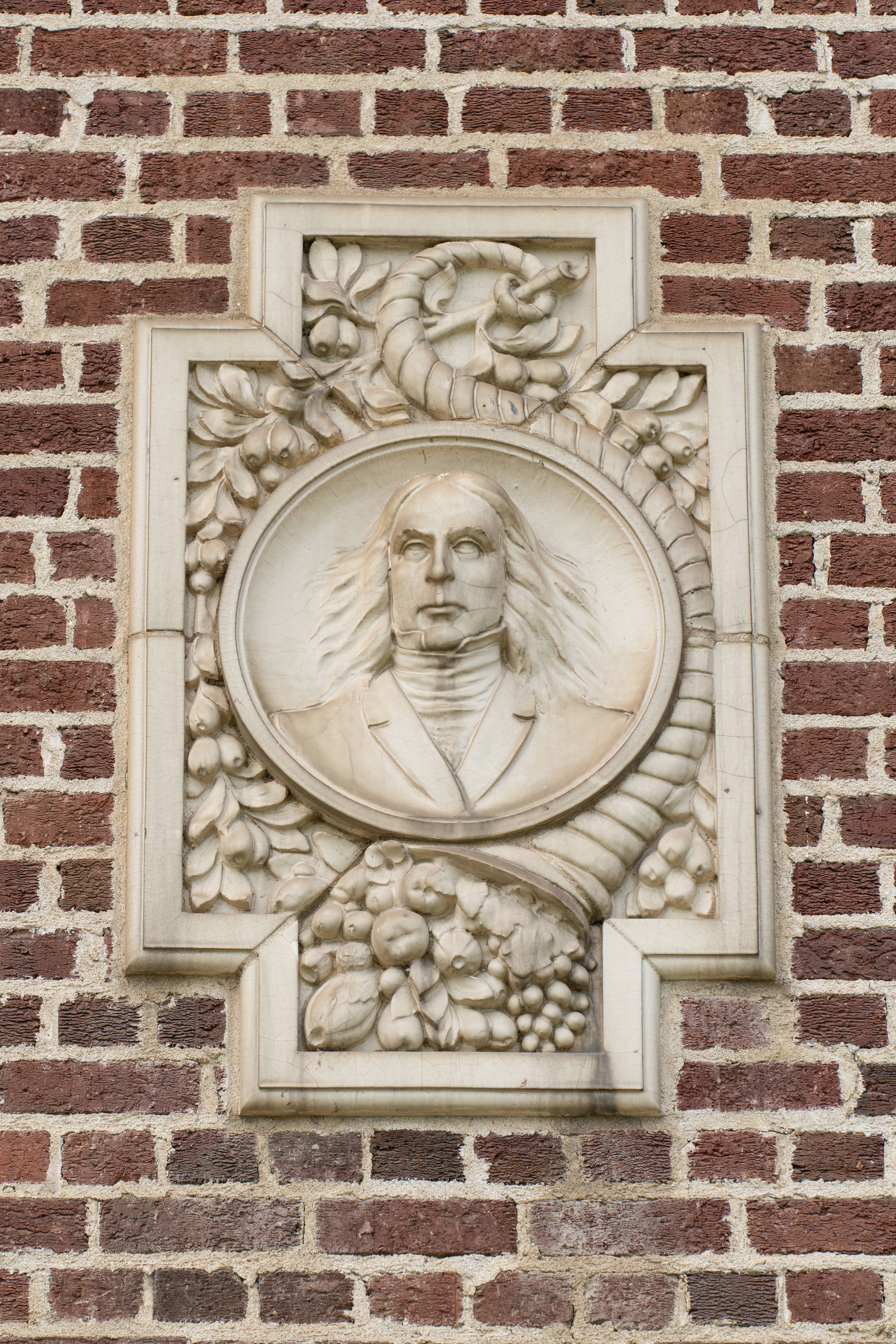
A relief of John McLoughlin is located on the north side of the front entrance. Two additional inlaid reliefs feature the seal of Oregon and a quote by Philip Sidney.

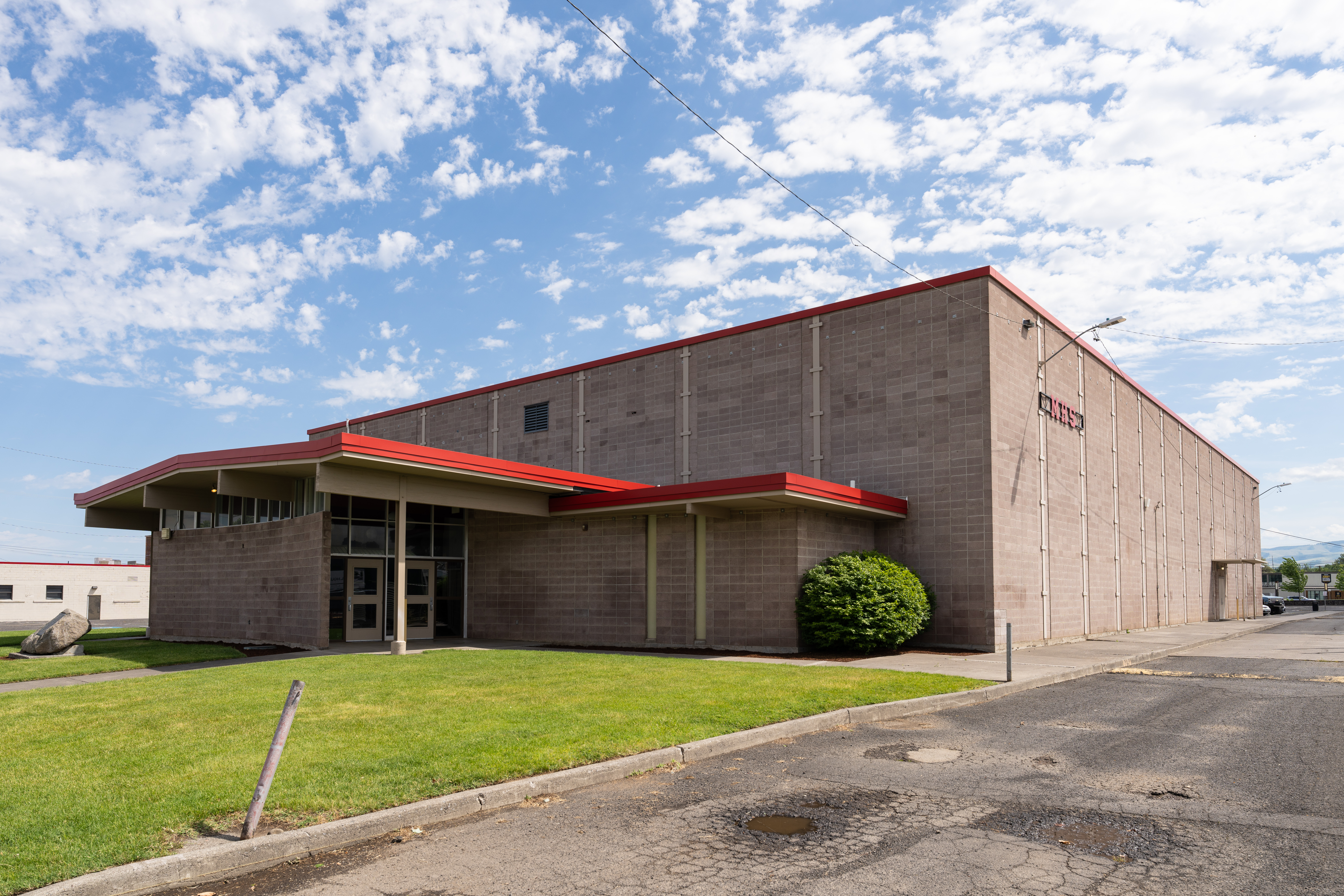
The memorial stone in front of Mac-Hi's gymnasium honors 41 men from the district who were killed in World War II.

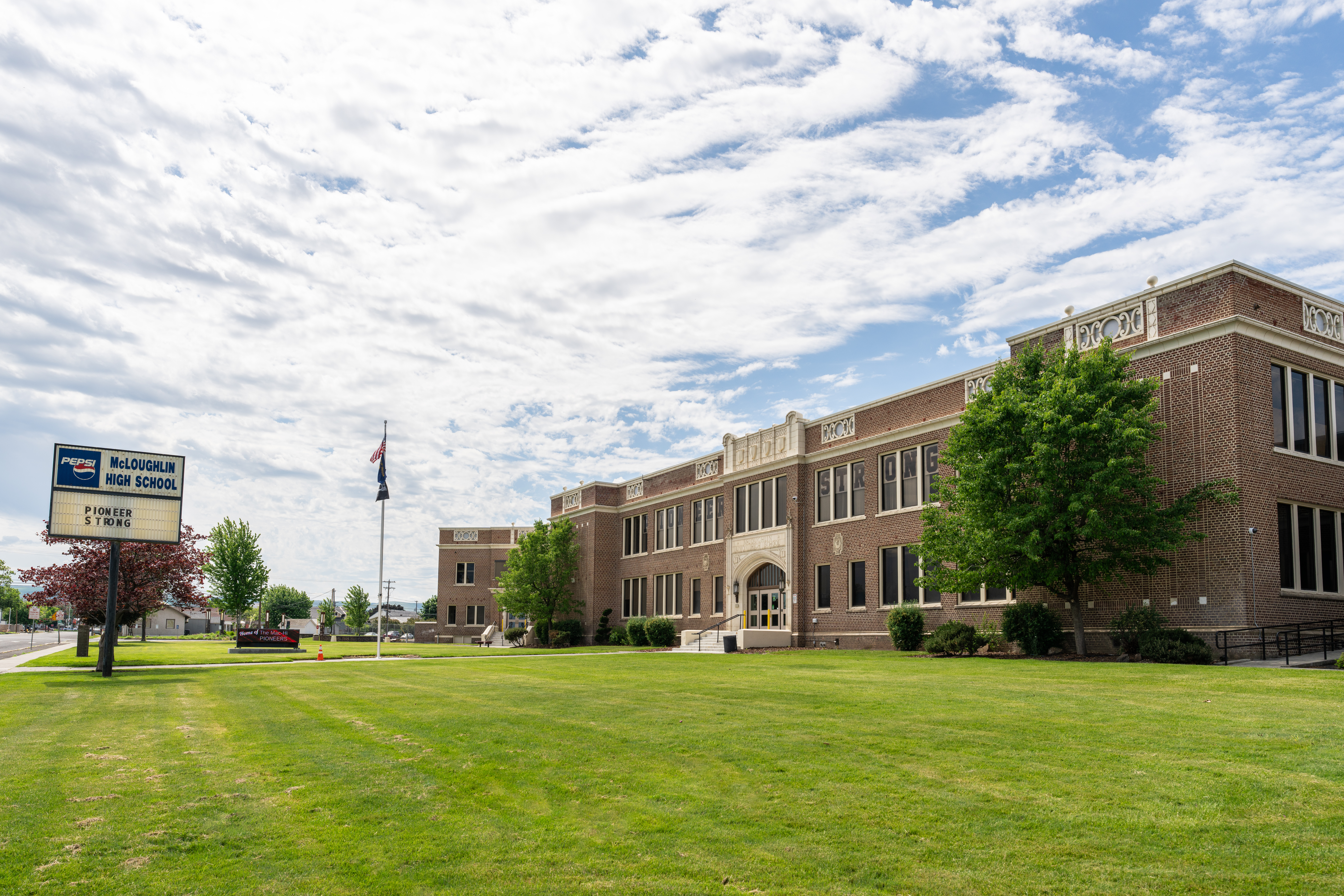
The front of Mac-Hi as seen from the north lawn in May 2023.

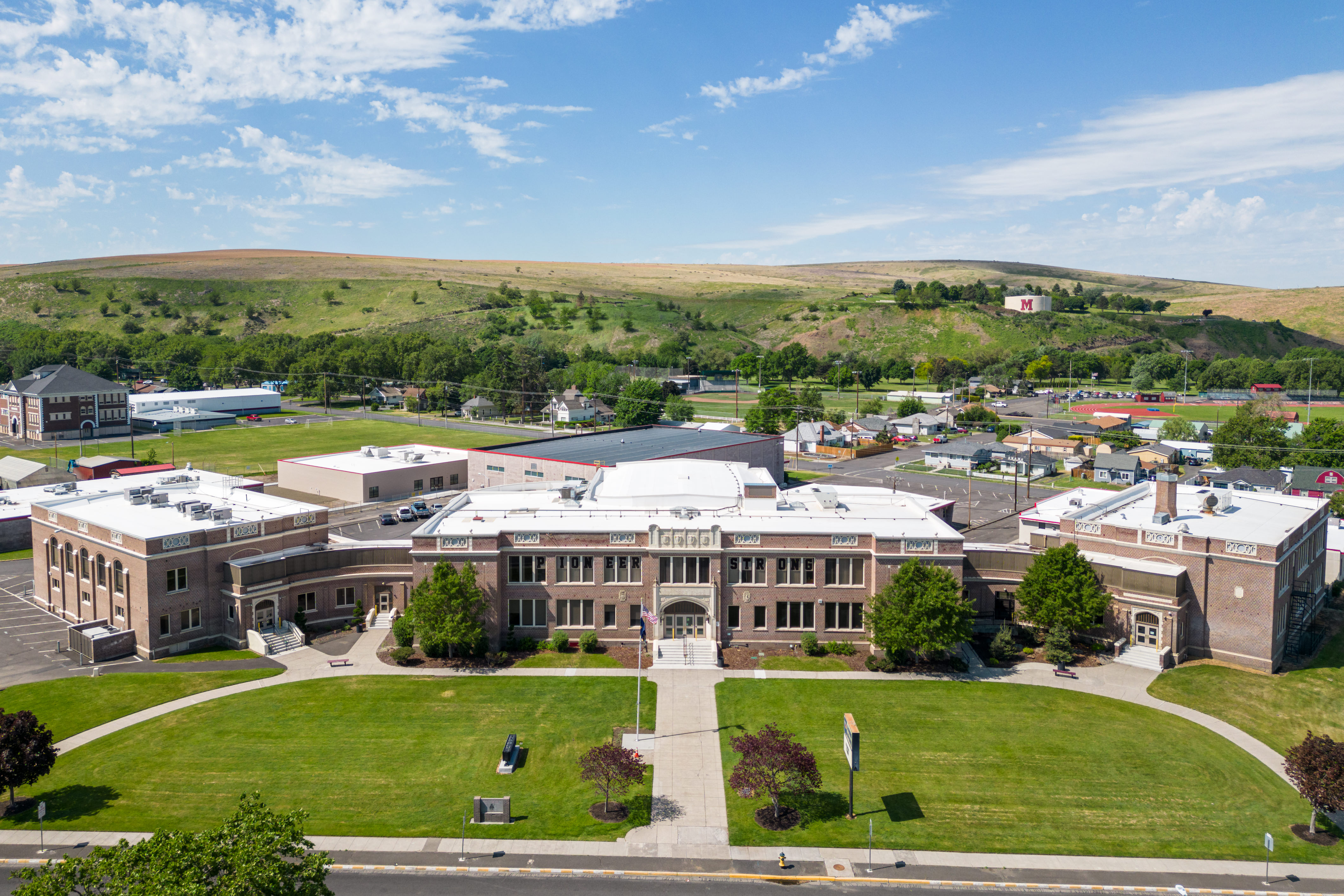
The original 1921 school remains the largest and most prominent feature of Mac-Hi's six building campus.

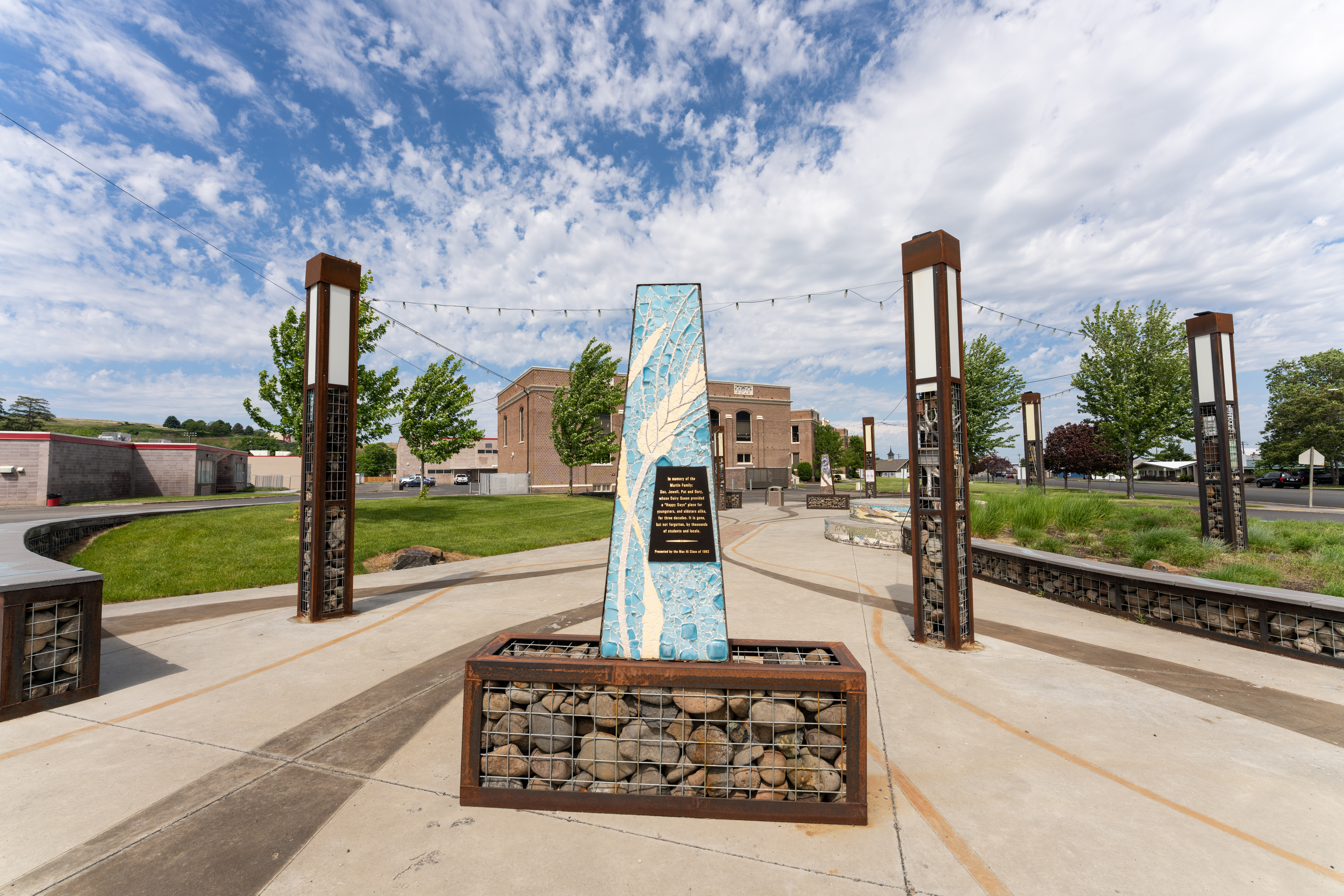
A plaza on the southeast of the campus honors a Dairy Queen run by the Martin family, which served students from that location for 30 years.
