= Oregon Route 37 =

State highway in northern Oregon, US

Oregon Route 37
- Route 37 highlighted in red

Route information
- Maintained by ODOT
- Length: 31.13 mi (50.10 km)

Major junctions
- South end: US 395 in Pendleton
- I-84 in Pendleton; US 30 in Pendleton; OR 334 near Myrick
- North end: US 730 in Cold Springs Junction

Location
- Country: United States
- State: Oregon
- County: Umatilla

Highway system
- Oregon Highways; Interstate; US; State; Named; Scenic
← OR 36	→ OR 38

Oregon Route 37 is a state highway in the U.S. state of Oregon that runs between Cold Springs Junction on the Columbia River in north-central Oregon, to the city of Pendleton. The highway comprises the Pendleton-Cold Springs Highway No. 36 (see Oregon highways and routes), and part of the Pendleton-John Day Highway No. 28.

== Route description ==
Oregon Route 37 begins (at its southern terminus) at an interchange with Interstate 84 and U.S. Route 395 just south of downtown Pendleton. Heading north from that interchange, the highway skirts the western edge of downtown, briefly shares an alignment with U.S. Route 30 over the Pendleton Highway No. 67, and then heads north out of Pendleton. At an intersection with Oregon Route 334, the highway turns west-northwest for the remainder of its length, terminating at an intersection with U.S. Route 730 near Cold Springs Junction. Just west of the junction lies Hat Rock State Park.

UPDATE: According to the ODOT Digital Video Log, Oregon Route 37 is signed as ending at the intersection of Westgate and Northgate (just south of Carden Ave) in Pendleton. This video log does not show the route as starting at I-84 Exit 209 and skirting the west edge of downtown Pendleton as the above paragraph suggests.

== Major intersections ==
Note: OR 37 uses several different highways (see Oregon highways and routes); the milepoint column shows mileage along these highways, not adjusted for equations, with the highway number in front.

The entire route is in Umatilla County.

Location	mi	km	Destinations	Notes
Pendleton	1.68	2.70	I-84 / US 395 – Portland, La Grande, Pilot Rock, John Day	
Pendleton	1.44	2.32	Frazer Avenue (Pendleton-John Day Highway) – Pendleton City Center	
Pendleton	2.57	4.14	US 30 east to I-84 east – Pendleton City Center	South end of US 30 overlap
Pendleton	2.08 30.75	3.35 49.49	US 30 west to I-84 west – Eastern Oregon Regional Airport	North end of US 30 overlap
	20.13	32.40	OR 334 east	
Cold Springs Junction	0.74	1.19	US 730 – Umatilla, Hermiston, Pasco, Spokane, Hat Rock State Park	
1.000 mi = 1.609 km; 1.000 km = 0.621 mi: Concurrency terminus
