= Cold Springs National Wildlife Refuge =

Protected area in Oregon, United States

- IUCN category IV (habitat/species management area)
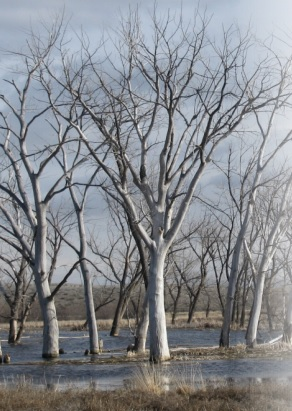

- Location within Oregon
- Location: Umatilla County, Oregon, U.S.A.
- Nearest city: Hermiston, Oregon
- Coordinates: 45.8637435°N 119.1494542°W
- Area: 3,117 acres (1,261 ha)
- Established: 1909
- Governing body: U.S. Fish and Wildlife Service
- Website: Cold Springs NWR

Cold Springs National Wildlife Refuge is a 3,117-acre (12.61 km^{2}) National Wildlife Refuge located 7 miles (10 km) northeast of Hermiston and 3 miles (5 km) south of the Columbia River in Umatilla County, Oregon; The refuge was established in 1909 as a preserve and breeding ground for native birds. It consists of diverse wetland habitats surrounded by upland habitat of big sagebrush and native steppe grasses. A riparian component of willow and cottonwood provides refuge for birds, mammals, and other animals.

The refuge overlays the 1,600-acre (650 ha) Cold Springs Reservoir, a component of the Umatilla Basin Project. The U.S. Reclamation Service built the Cold Springs Dam to supply irrigation water for local agriculture in this arid and seasonally-cold desert region. The earth-fill dam was completed in 1908.

Management has broadened to include conservation and restoration of native habitat and species characteristic to this desert ecosystem. Refuge wetlands support large numbers of wintering waterfowl while adjacent riparian habitat supports an abundance of songbirds and healthy populations of western mule deer and desert elk. Refuge visitors have easy access to this popular refuge for hunting, fishing, and wildlife watching.
