= Lookingglass Creek =

Location
- Country: United States
- State: Oregon
- County: Union County

Physical characteristics
- Mouth
  - location: Grande Ronde River
  - coordinates: 45.7068°N 117.8424°W

Lookingglass Creek is an 18-mile (29 km) long stream in the U.S. state of Oregon, located in Union County. Starting in the Umatilla National Forest near Tollgate, it flows generally east then turns south to join the Grande Ronde River about 10 miles (16 km) north of Elgin. The Lookingglass Fish Hatchery is located on the creek.

On March 29, 2024, a tanker truck carrying Chinook salmon smolt crashed after leaving the hatchery. The majority of the fish escaped into the river and survived.

== See also ==
- List of rivers of Oregon
