= Cold Springs Dam =

Dam in Oregon, United States

Coordinates: 45°51′39″N 119°10′21″W

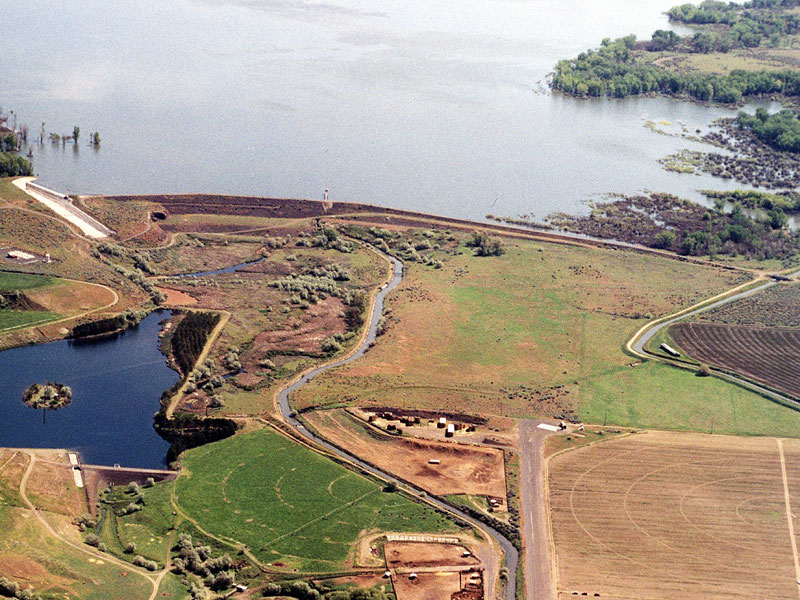
- Interactive map of Cold Springs Dam
- Country: United States
- Location: Umatilla County, Oregon
- Status: Operational
- Opening date: 1908

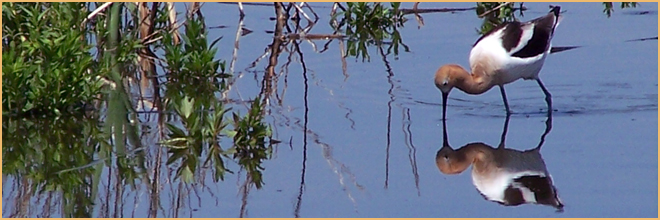
Cold Springs National Wildlife Refuge

Cold Springs Dam is an earthen dam 7 miles (11 km) northeast of Hermiston and 3 miles (5 km) south of the Columbia River in Umatilla County, Oregon.

The dam impounds the water of the Umatilla River to create Cold Springs Reservoir, a component of the Umatilla Basin Project of the United States Bureau of Reclamation. Dating from 1908, the first generation of the bureau's projects in the American west, the reservoir supplies irrigation water for local agriculture in this arid and seasonally-cold desert region. The nearby 1927 McKay Dam and McKay Reservoir are part of the same water management project.

The reservoir also overlays the Cold Springs National Wildlife Refuge, established in 1909.

The dam stands 105 feet (32 m) high and has a capacity of roughly 40,000 acre-feet (49,000,000 m^{3}).
