= Milton-Freewater Unified School District =

School district in Oregon, United States

The Milton-Freewater Unified School District (#7) is a school district in the U.S. state of Oregon in that serves the city of Milton-Freewater and the surrounding area.

== Demographics ==
In the 2009 school year, the district had 7 students classified as homeless by the Department of Education, or 0.4% of students in the district.

== Schools ==
- McLoughlin High School
- Central Middle School is home to grades six, seven, and eight. There are approximately 45 staff and 400 students. Central's school mascot is the Cougar.
- Gib Olinger Elementary School serves kindergarten, first, second, and third grades, with approximately 500 students and 36 staff.
- Freewater Elementary School serves approximately 350 third, fourth, and fifth grade students with 44 staff. Freewater's school mascot is the Wildcat.
- Ferndale Elementary School is the district's only rural school located five miles North of town. 42 staff serve approximately 300 students.
