= Umapine, Oregon =

Unincorporated community in the state of Oregon, United States

Coordinates: 45.9765°N 118.4964°W

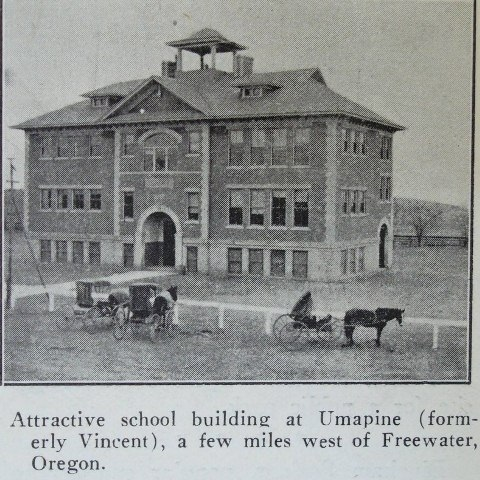
Umapine School, circa 1911

Umapine (/uməpaɪn/) is a census-designated place and unincorporated community in Umatilla County, Oregon, United States, two miles from the Oregon-Washington border. The traditional boundary covers a wide area. As of the 2020 census, Umapine had a population of 285. The community is part of the Pendleton–Hermiston Micropolitan Statistical Area. The current economy is supported by agriculture, including wheat and hay farms, apple orchards, and an increasing number of vineyards. The main establishments in the town are Tate's Umapine Market, The Umapine Creamery and the Waterhole Tavern.

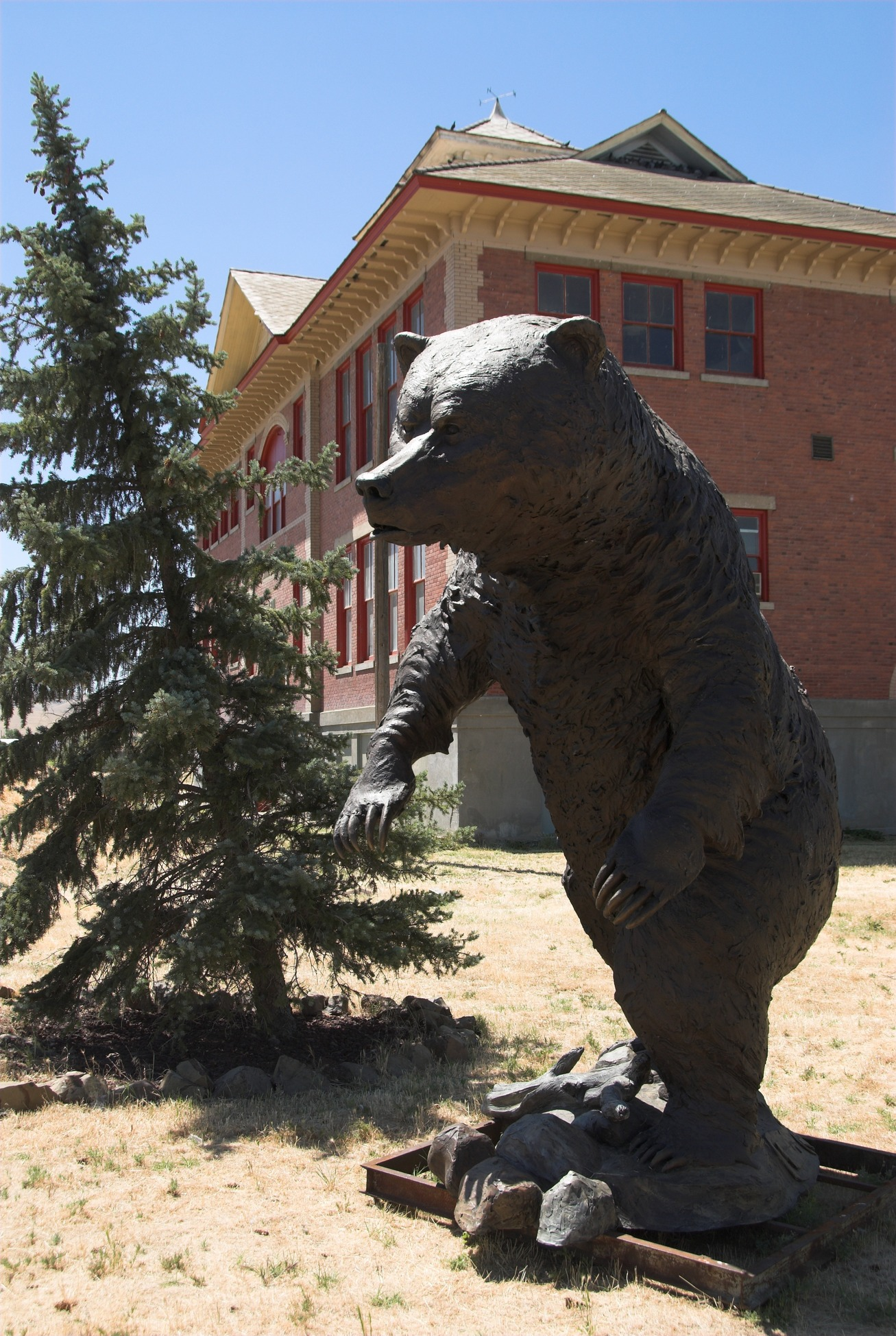

For several decades the town had a school that served kindergarten through twelfth grade and whose mascot was the Umapine Chiefs. The enrollment at the school averaged 100 students. The school closed and incorporated with nearby Ferndale School District in 1984, which later incorporated with Milton-Freewater Unified School District in the early 1990s. In the early 1990s, the 1911 school building was sold to a local artist who established a fine art bronze foundry, Old School Bronze (formerly Northwest Art Casting). After the death of the owner, the school subsequently fell into disuse and placed on the market for sale. It is a three-story brick structure on 5 acres.

It is home to two restaurants, Tate's Mercantile and the Waterhole, and the Umapine Creamery. Tate's is housed in one of the original post office and creamery's from 1900s. The Waterhole has existed in various forms to the 1940s. Umapine Creamery is a newer addition. The family-run business and dairy sells cheese at premiere locations throughout the Walla Walla Valley. The tall, dark blue, water tower is a landmark among local pilots.

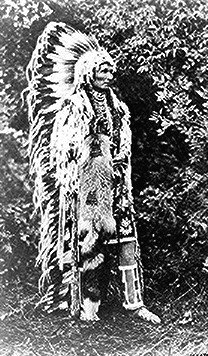
Umapine's namesake, Wakonkonwelasonmi or Chief Umapine

The community holds regular community "Spring Cleans" and Community Yard Sales. Alternating between the two every two years. The community is now home to several artisans as well as century-old cattle operations. The population is a mix of White and Hispanics. The town of 300 is home to several employers.

== History ==
It was established as a railroad stop on the Walla Walla Valley Railway with an active lumber yard and large population of dairies in the early 1900s. The railway was abandoned in 1942 and became the Umapine Highway. Umapine was originally named Vincent, Oregon, until the community acted to get its own post office. Since there was already a post office by that same name in Wallowa County, the place was renamed for a prominent Indian chief who had once lived in the area, Chief Umapine, who was either of the Cayuse or Umatilla people. The post office was established in June 1916. After several fires in the post office building, Umapine post office, ZIP code 97881, was closed in December 1966. Umapine now has a Milton-Freewater mailing address, whose ZIP code is 97862.

1936 State Line earthquake was centered on Umapine. Near Umapine there were cracks in the ground up to 6 inches (15 cm) wide that had water flowing out of them, demonstrating soil liquefaction. Some cracks were 8 feet (2.4 m) deep. Observers in Walla Walla noted rumbling noises immediately preceding the first shocks. At one point the ground dropped by 2.4 metres (7.9 feet). About 70% of headstones at a nearby cemetery were found to have been rotated clockwise.
