= Myrick, Oregon =

Unincorporated community in the state of Oregon, United States

- Unincorporated community
- Location within the state of Oregon Myrick, Oregon (the United States)
- Coordinates: 45°48′15″N 118°42′52″W
- Country: United States
- State: Oregon
- County: Umatilla
- Elevation: 1,719 ft (524 m)
- Time zone: UTC-8 (Pacific (PST))
  - Summer (DST): UTC-7 (PDT)
- Area codes: 458 and 541
- GNIS feature ID: 1637853
- Coordinates and elevation from Geographic Names Information System

Myrick is an unincorporated historic community in Umatilla County, Oregon, United States. It is between Pendleton and Helix, just south of Oregon Route 334.

Myrick is a station on the Burlington Northern Railroad that was originally named "Warren". Because of the confusion with Warren in Columbia County, the name was changed to honor Samuel Jackson Myrick, who came to Oregon from Missouri in 1884 and settled in the area. Myrick post office ran from 1902 to 1908. John Myrick was the first postmaster.

The Myrick family became successful wheat farmers in the area.
