= Holdman, Oregon =

Unincorporated community in the state of Oregon, United States

Holdman
- Unincorporated community
- Location within the state of Oregon Holdman (the United States)
- Coordinates: 45°52′19″N 118°55′57″W
- Country: United States
- State: Oregon
- County: Umatilla
- Elevation: 1,007 ft (307 m)
- Time zone: UTC-8 (Pacific (PST))
  - Summer (DST): UTC-7 (PDT)
- ZIP code: 97835
- Area codes: 458 and 541
- GNIS feature ID: 1121899

Holdman is an unincorporated community in Umatilla County, Oregon, United States. It is about 17.5 miles (28.2 km) north-northwest of Pendleton and approximately 12.5 miles (20.1 km) east of Hermiston, at the intersection of County Road 800 and the Pendleton-Cold Springs Highway. The town was named for the Holdman brothers, early settlers of the area. Holdman post office was established in 1900.

In 1915, Holdman was described as having a population of 25, with a United Brethren church and a schoolhouse. The schoolhouse is still standing as of 2024.

Holdman is part of the Pendleton–Hermiston Micropolitan Statistical Area.
