= Weston, Oregon =

- City
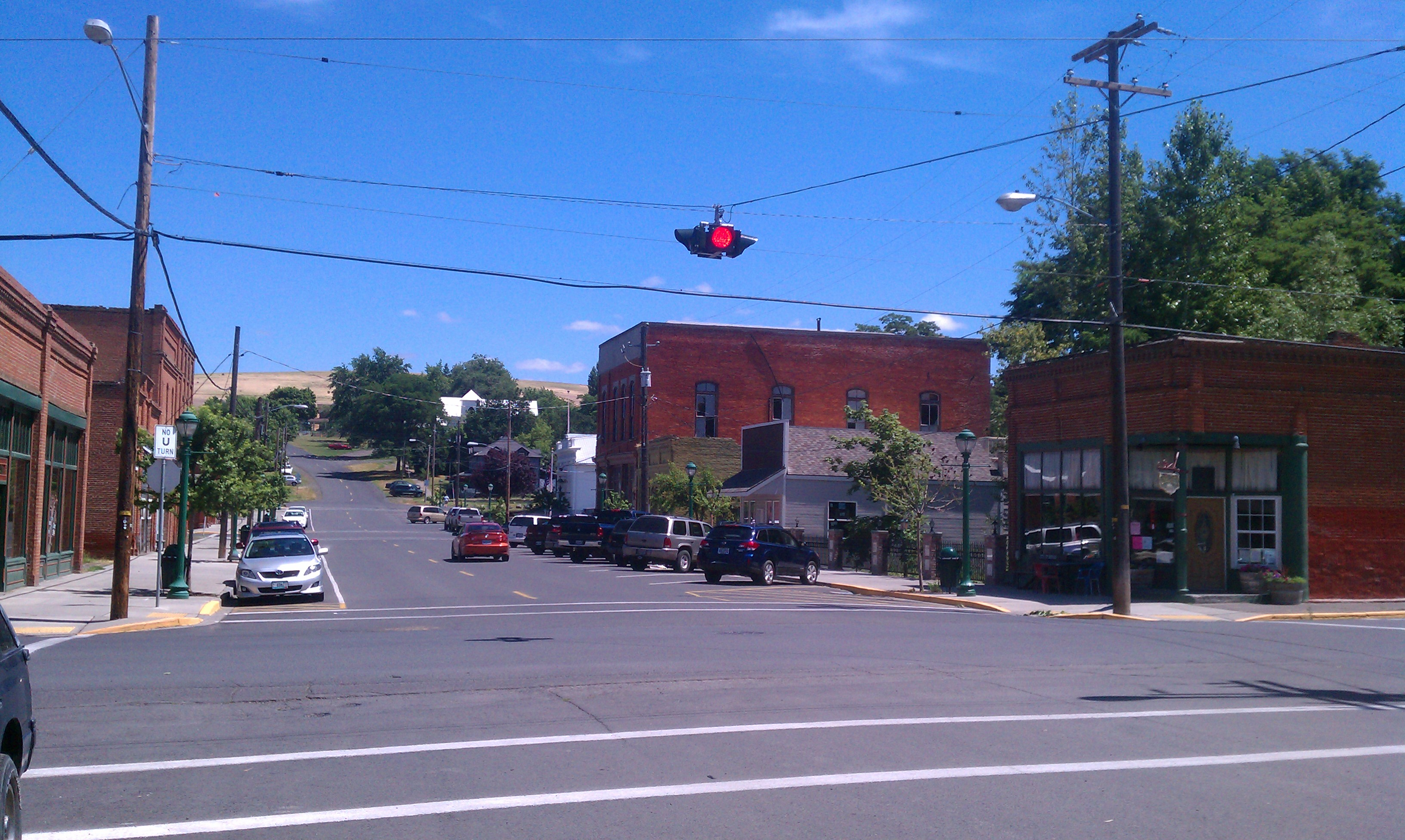
- Historic Main street.

- Location in Oregon
- Coordinates: 45°48′59″N 118°25′33″W
- Country: United States
- State: Oregon
- County: Umatilla
- Incorporated: 1878

Area
  - Total: 0.68 sq mi (1.76 km^{2})
  - Land: 0.68 sq mi (1.76 km^{2})
  - Water: 0 sq mi (0.00 km^{2})
- Elevation: 1,821 ft (555 m)

Population (2020)
  - Total: 706
  - Density: 1,038.4/sq mi (400.92/km^{2})
- Time zone: UTC-8 (Pacific)
  - Summer (DST): UTC-7 (Pacific)
- ZIP code: 97886
- Area code: 541
- FIPS code: 41-80350
- GNIS feature ID: 2412241
- Website: www.cityofweston.org

Weston is a city in Umatilla County, Oregon, United States. It was originally a post office called Mitchell's Station, established in February 1867. In September 1869, T.T. Lieuallen renamed the post office after his hometown, Weston, Missouri. The population was 706 at the 2020 census. It is part of the Pendleton–Hermiston Micropolitan Statistical Area.

== History ==
Weston was incorporated by the Oregon Legislative Assembly on October 19, 1878.

Weston is best known for its connection with novelist Nard Jones (1904–1972), who lived in the city with his parents between 1919 and 1927, and whose first novel Oregon Detour was set in an Oregon town of 600 inhabitants called "Creston". When his novel, written according to the tenets of the New Realism literary movement (established years before by Sherwood Anderson, Sinclair Lewis and others) was published in 1930, many of the residents were convinced that his characters were based on local inhabitants, and considered the work a slander against the town. While the legend that Jones was sued and ran out of town for his book is not true, members of the town made an effort to locally suppress access to the book: copies of the novel were stolen from the local library; after the novel became the subject for a high school student's book report, his English teacher removed the book from both the reading list and the high school library. According to George Venn, local literary historian, even in the 1980s, "trying to figure out or trying to remember who the 'real people' in the novel is still a local pastime."

== Geography ==
According to the United States Census Bureau, the city has a total area of 0.68 square miles (1.76 km^{2}), all of it land. Weston is located at the foot of the Blue Mountains, on Pine Creek.

=== Climate ===
This region experiences warm (but not hot) and dry summers, with no average monthly temperatures above 69 °F (21 °C). According to the Köppen Climate Classification system, Weston has a warm-summer Mediterranean climate, abbreviated "Csb" on climate maps.

== Demographics ==
Historical population
Census	Pop.	Note	%±
1880	446		—
1890	568		27.4%
1900	626		10.2%
1910	499		−20.3%
1920	595		19.2%
1930	384		−35.5%
1940	498		29.7%
1950	679		36.3%
1960	783		15.3%
1970	660		−15.7%
1980	719		8.9%
1990	606		−15.7%
2000	717		18.3%
2010	667		−7.0%
2020	706		5.8%
U.S. Decennial Census

=== 2020 census ===
As of the 2020 census, Weston had a population of 706. The median age was 43.9 years. 22.9% of residents were under the age of 18 and 21.4% of residents were 65 years of age or older. For every 100 females there were 104.6 males, and for every 100 females age 18 and over there were 102.2 males age 18 and over.

0% of residents lived in urban areas, while 100.0% lived in rural areas.

There were 276 households in Weston, of which 32.6% had children under the age of 18 living in them. Of all households, 42.8% were married-couple households, 24.3% were households with a male householder and no spouse or partner present, and 25.7% were households with a female householder and no spouse or partner present. About 29.8% of all households were made up of individuals and 18.5% had someone living alone who was 65 years of age or older.

There were 307 housing units, of which 10.1% were vacant. Among occupied housing units, 80.4% were owner-occupied and 19.6% were renter-occupied. The homeowner vacancy rate was 1.8% and the rental vacancy rate was <0.1%.

Racial composition as of the 2020 census
Race	Number	Percent
White	574	81.3%
Black or African American	3	0.4%
American Indian and Alaska Native	13	1.8%
Asian	7	1.0%
Native Hawaiian and Other Pacific Islander	2	0.3%
Some other race	37	5.2%
Two or more races	70	9.9%
Hispanic or Latino (of any race)	75	10.6%

=== 2010 census ===
As of the census of 2010, there were 667 people, 252 households, and 171 families residing in the city. The population density was 980.9 inhabitants per square mile (378.7/km^{2}). There were 271 housing units at an average density of 398.5 per square mile (153.9/km^{2}). The racial makeup of the city was 83.5% White, 0.3% African American, 3.4% Native American, 3.1% Asian, 5.8% from other races, and 3.7% from two or more races. Hispanic or Latino of any race were 8.5% of the population.

There were 252 households, of which 34.5% had children under the age of 18 living with them, 46.0% were married couples living together, 10.3% had a female householder with no husband present, 11.5% had a male householder with no wife present, and 32.1% were non-families. 27.0% of all households were made up of individuals, and 13.9% had someone living alone who was 65 years of age or older. The average household size was 2.65 and the average family size was 3.12.

The median age in the city was 39.5 years. 25.8% of residents were under the age of 18; 6.4% were between the ages of 18 and 24; 25.3% were from 25 to 44; 26.8% were from 45 to 64; and 15.6% were 65 years of age or older. The gender makeup of the city was 52.0% male and 48.0% female.

=== 2000 census ===
As of the census of 2000, there were 717 people, 265 households, and 191 families residing in the city. The population density was 1,318.7 inhabitants per square mile (509.2/km^{2}). There were 280 housing units at an average density of 515.0 per square mile (198.8/km^{2}). The racial makeup of the city was 83.40% White, 3.35% Native American, 10.88% from other races, and 2.37% from two or more races. Hispanic or Latino of any race were 15.76% of the population.

There were 265 households, out of which 32.8% had children under the age of 18 living with them, 54.3% were married couples living together, 8.7% had a female householder with no husband present, and 27.9% were non-families. 25.3% of all households were made up of individuals, and 11.3% had someone living alone who was 65 years of age or older. The average household size was 2.71 and the average family size was 3.18.

In the city, the population was spread out, with 28.2% under the age of 18, 6.8% from 18 to 24, 27.1% from 25 to 44, 25.0% from 45 to 64, and 13.0% who were 65 years of age or older. The median age was 37 years. For every 100 females, there were 97.5 males. For every 100 females age 18 and over, there were 97.3 males.

The median income for a household in the city was $36,905, and the median income for a family was $39,063. Males had a median income of $25,682 versus $21,625 for females. The per capita income for the city was $13,089. About 10.0% of families and 12.9% of the population were below the poverty line, including 14.2% of those under age 18 and 14.3% of those age 65 or over.
