= Helix, Oregon =

- City
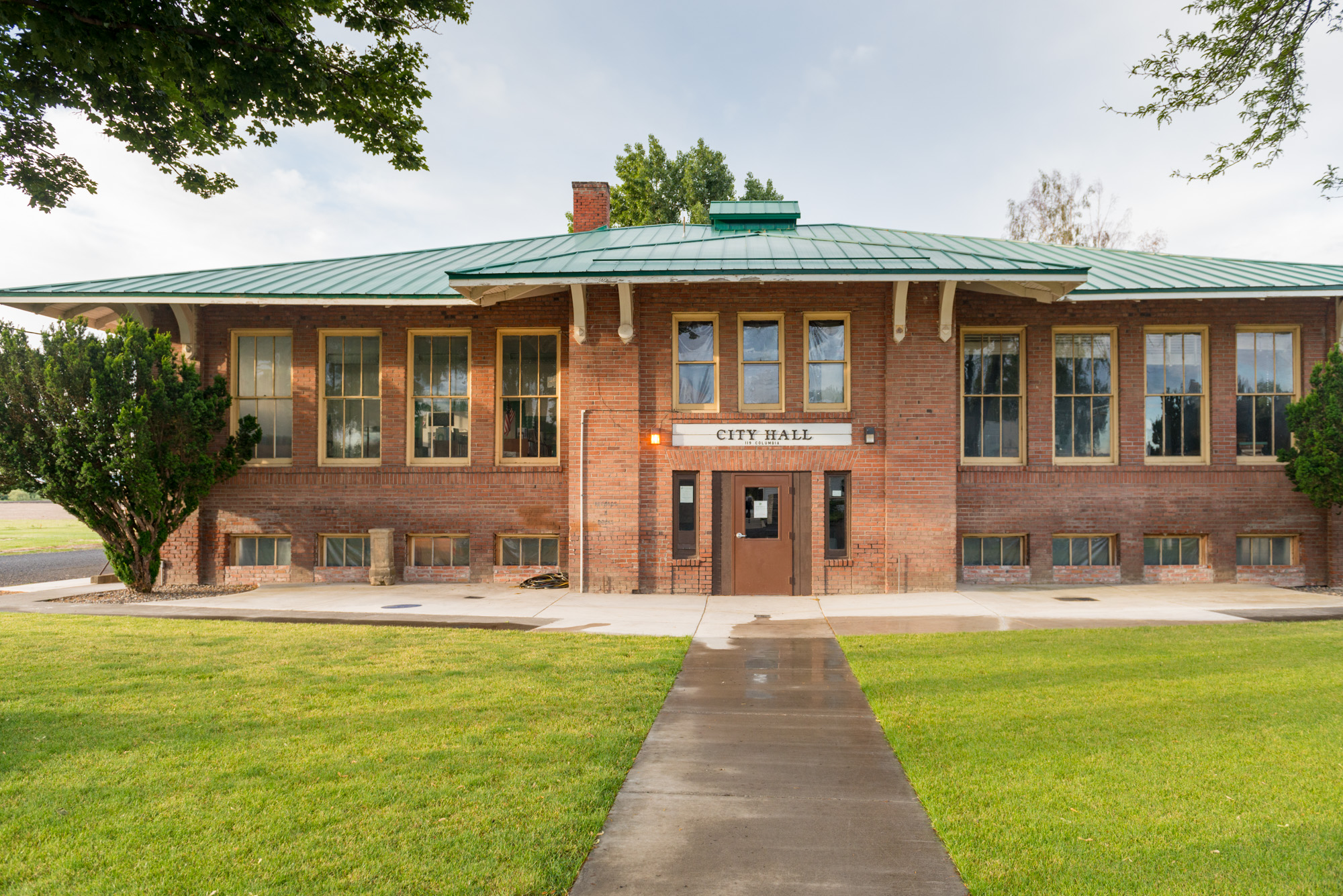
- City hall
- Motto: Heart of the Country
- Location in Oregon
- Coordinates: 45°51′02″N 118°39′33″W
- Country: United States
- State: Oregon
- County: Umatilla
- Incorporated: 1903

Area
  - Total: 0.13 sq mi (0.33 km^{2})
  - Land: 0.13 sq mi (0.33 km^{2})
  - Water: 0 sq mi (0.00 km^{2})
- Elevation: 1,755 ft (535 m)

Population (2020)
  - Total: 194
  - Density: 1,530.3/sq mi (590.84/km^{2})
- Time zone: UTC-8 (Pacific)
  - Summer (DST): UTC-7 (Pacific)
- ZIP code: 97835
- Area codes: 458 and 541
- FIPS code: 41-33250
- GNIS feature ID: 2410735

Helix is a city in Umatilla County, Oregon, United States. As of the 2020 census, Helix had a population of 194. It is part of the Pendleton–Hermiston Micropolitan Statistical Area.

== History ==
Helix, a geometry term and a part of the ear, was originally to be named Oxford, but authorities declined that option when the community's post office was to be named in 1880. The citizens then decided on Helix since a resident had recently had ear surgery. The author of Oregon Geographic Names, Lewis A. McArthur, had his doubts about the story.

== Geography ==
According to the United States Census Bureau, the city has a total area of 0.13 square miles (0.34 km^{2}), all of it land.

== Demographics ==
Historical population
Census	Pop.	Note	%±
1910	109		—
1920	200		83.5%
1930	193		−3.5%
1940	121		−37.3%
1950	182		50.4%
1960	148		−18.7%
1970	152		2.7%
1980	155		2.0%
1990	150		−3.2%
2000	183		22.0%
2010	184		0.5%
2020	194		5.4%
U.S. Decennial Census

=== 2020 census ===
As of the 2020 census, Helix had a population of 194. The median age was 34.6 years, 34.5% of residents were under the age of 18, and 9.3% were 65 years of age or older. For every 100 females there were 96.0 males, and for every 100 females age 18 and over there were 86.8 males age 18 and over.

0% of residents lived in urban areas, while 100.0% lived in rural areas.

There were 60 households in Helix, of which 61.7% had children under the age of 18 living in them. Of all households, 58.3% were married-couple households, 10.0% were households with a male householder and no spouse or partner present, and 30.0% were households with a female householder and no spouse or partner present. About 6.7% of all households were made up of individuals and 1.7% had someone living alone who was 65 years of age or older.

There were 77 housing units, of which 22.1% were vacant. Among occupied housing units, 75.0% were owner-occupied and 25.0% were renter-occupied. The homeowner vacancy rate was 11.3% and the rental vacancy rate was 11.1%.

Racial composition as of the 2020 census
Race	Number	Percent
White	167	86.1%
Black or African American	0	0%
American Indian and Alaska Native	8	4.1%
Asian	2	1.0%
Native Hawaiian and Other Pacific Islander	0	0%
Some other race	3	1.5%
Two or more races	14	7.2%
Hispanic or Latino (of any race)	13	6.7%

=== 2010 census ===
As of the census of 2010, there were 184 people, 55 households, and 46 families living in the city. The population density was 1,415.4 inhabitants per square mile (546.5/km^{2}). There were 68 housing units at an average density of 523.1 per square mile (202.0/km^{2}). The racial makeup of the city was 81.0% White, 8.7% Native American, 3.8% from other races, and 6.5% from two or more races. Hispanic or Latino of any race were 6.0% of the population.

There were 55 households, of which 43.6% had children under the age of 18 living with them, 63.6% were married couples living together, 10.9% had a female householder with no husband present, 9.1% had a male householder with no wife present, and 16.4% were non-families. 9.1% of all households were made up of individuals, and 1.8% had someone living alone who was 65 years of age or older. The average household size was 3.35 and the average family size was 3.54.

The median age in the city was 35.7 years. 34.8% of residents were under the age of 18; 6.5% were between the ages of 18 and 24; 26.1% were from 25 to 44; 21.3% were from 45 to 64; and 11.4% were 65 years of age or older. The gender makeup of the city was 51.6% male and 48.4% female.

=== 2000 census ===
As of the census of 2000, there were 183 people, 62 households, and 46 families living in the city. The population density was 1,600.5 inhabitants per square mile (618.0/km^{2}). There were 68 housing units at an average density of 594.7 per square mile (229.6/km^{2}). The racial makeup of the city was 94.54% White, 2.19% Native American, 0.55% from other races, and 2.73% from two or more races. Hispanic or Latino of any race were 2.73% of the population.

There were 62 households, out of which 48.4% had children under the age of 18 living with them, 62.9% were married couples living together, 8.1% had a female householder with no husband present, and 24.2% were non-families. 19.4% of all households were made up of individuals, and 8.1% had someone living alone who was 65 years of age or older. The average household size was 2.95 and the average family size was 3.47.

In the city, the population was spread out, with 38.8% under the age of 18, 3.8% from 18 to 24, 31.1% from 25 to 44, 14.8% from 45 to 64, and 11.5% who were 65 years of age or older. The median age was 30 years. For every 100 females, there were 105.6 males. For every 100 females age 18 and over, there were 93.1 males.

The median income for a household in the city was $32,292, and the median income for a family was $36,250. Males had a median income of $33,750 versus $27,500 for females. The per capita income for the city was $13,338. About 14.3% of families and 13.6% of the population were below the poverty line, including 19.2% of those under the age of 18 and 6.3% of those 65 or over.

== Economy ==
Helix School is the predominant employer within the city.

The immediate land surrounding Helix is used almost exclusively for dryland farming. The predominant crop is wheat with canola or peas used as a cover crop and break crop. The Stateline Wind Farm and Vansycle Wind Project are nearby.

== Arts and culture ==
=== Annual cultural events ===
The city is home to the Helix Heart of the Country Rodeo held on the first Saturday in June every year.

The city also hosts the annual Wheatstock music festival during August.

== Notable people ==
- Bob Brogoitti, Oregon state legislator
- Raymond F. Rees, former Adjutant General of Oregon
- Lowell Stockman, representative from Oregon to the United States House of Representatives from 1943 to 1953
