= Milton-Freewater, Oregon =

- City
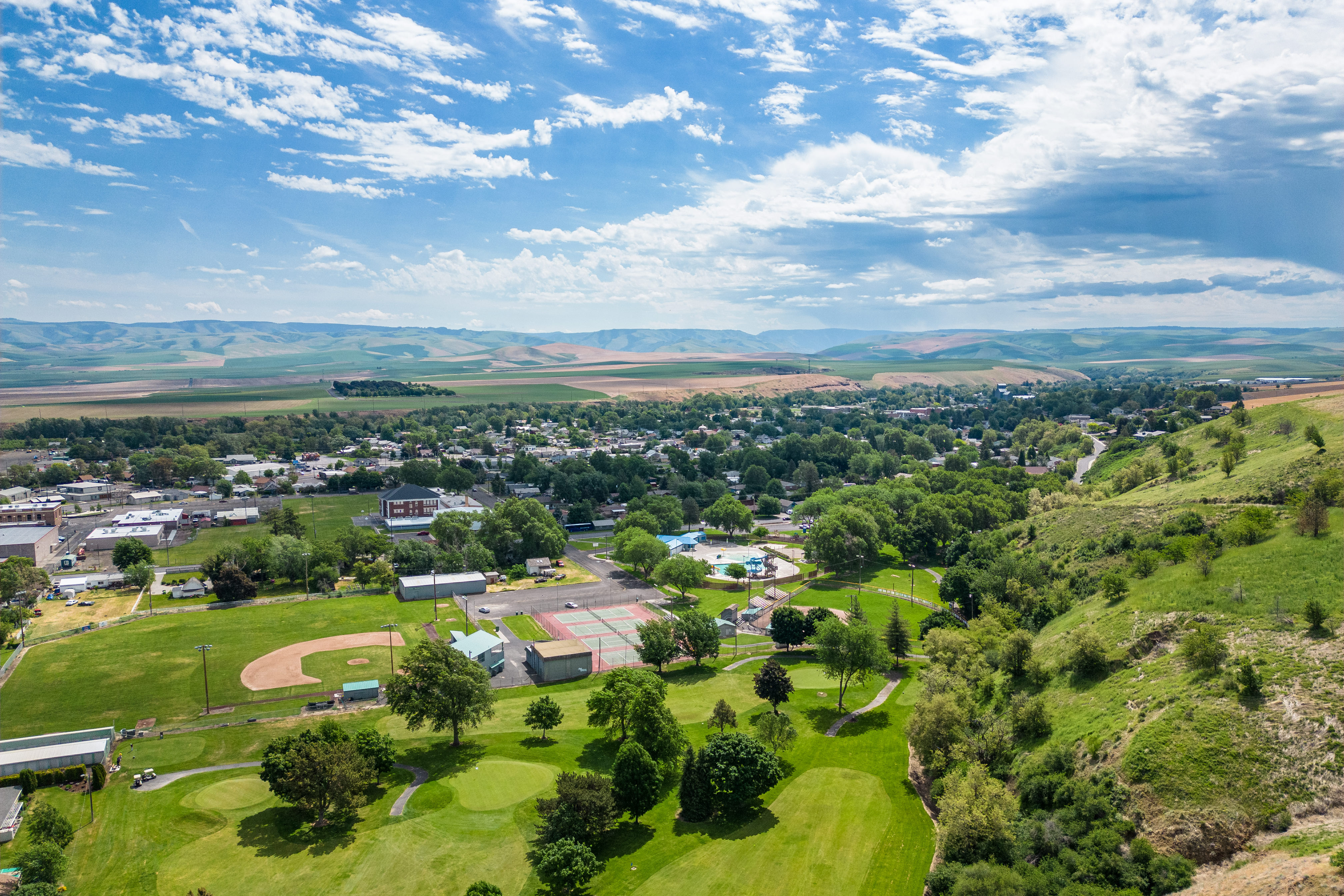
- Looking southeast over the city from Milton-Freewater Golf Course
- Nickname: Muddy Frogwater Country
- Location in Oregon
- Coordinates: 45°56′02″N 118°23′27″W
- Country: United States
- State: Oregon
- County: Umatilla
- Incorporated: 1950

Government
  - Mayor: Mike Odman

Area
  - Total: 2.03 sq mi (5.26 km^{2})
  - Land: 2.03 sq mi (5.26 km^{2})
  - Water: 0 sq mi (0.00 km^{2})
- Elevation: 1,037 ft (316 m)

Population (2020)
  - Total: 7,151
  - Density: 3,524.1/sq mi (1,360.67/km^{2})
- Time zone: UTC-8 (Pacific)
  - Summer (DST): UTC-7 (Pacific)
- ZIP code: 97862
- Area codes: 458 and 541
- FIPS code: 41-48600
- GNIS feature ID: 2411115
- Website: www.mfcity.com

Milton-Freewater is a city in Umatilla County, Oregon, United States. The city received its current name in 1951 when the neighboring rival cities of Milton and Freewater voted to merge. The population was 7,151 at the 2020 census. It is part of the Pendleton–Hermiston Micropolitan Statistical Area. Milton-Freewater is home to a growing wine industry.

== History ==
First settled in 1868, the community was incorporated as Milton by 1873. It is uncertain how the name was chosen; perhaps in hopes of building a mill, or perhaps in honor of English poet John Milton.

Freewater received its name from the offer of free residential water rights to attract new settlers. Before that name was chosen other proposed names had been New Walla Walla and Wallaette. The town was located to the north of and directly adjacent to Milton.

In 1936, a magnitude 6.1 earthquake centered 6 miles (9.7 km) to the northwest caused significant damage in and around Milton-Freewater. This earthquake was followed by numerous aftershocks and had a temporary effect on the water table.

In the 1960s, Milton-Freewater billed itself as the pea capital of the world. There were several pea canneries in town. It held an annual festival and parade in May, known as the "Pea Festival." In the late 1970s, agricultural practices and crop prices changed the dynamics of the local economy, and peas were no longer grown as abundantly as they previously had been. One by one the canneries closed down. The town dropped the title and the festival. At the time, Milton-Freewater had a popular August event called the "Corn Roast" and the decision was made to increase the festival to a weekend-long celebration which, in 1981, became known as the Muddy Frogwater Festival (the city had sometimes been referred to as Muddy-Frogwater). The festival is now a three-day event held the third weekend in August each year. Festival activities have included frog-jumping contests, concerts, karaoke competitions, the corn roast, and a dance. The Friends of the Library have held a large outdoor book sale at the festival each year since 1993. On the Sunday morning of the festival there is an outdoor interdenominational church service. The city also has sponsored the creation of more than 50 chainsaw sculpture frogs at local businesses to help market itself as a "fun town" with a quirky nickname.

== Geography ==
According to the United States Census Bureau, the city has a total area of 1.99 square miles (5.15 km^{2}), all of it land.

== Climate ==
Milton-Freewater has a steppe climate (BSk) according to the Köppen climate classification system.

Climate data for Milton-Freewater, Oregon (1991–2020 normals, extremes 1928–present)
Month	Jan	Feb	Mar	Apr	May	Jun	Jul	Aug	Sep	Oct	Nov	Dec	Year
Record high °F (°C)	70 (21)	78 (26)	81 (27)	90 (32)	99 (37)	114 (46)	109 (43)	111 (44)	103 (39)	92 (33)	82 (28)	71 (22)	114 (46)
Mean daily maximum °F (°C)	44.2 (6.8)	48.6 (9.2)	57.5 (14.2)	64.7 (18.2)	73.6 (23.1)	80.5 (26.9)	90.4 (32.4)	89.3 (31.8)	79.6 (26.4)	65.8 (18.8)	51.7 (10.9)	43.5 (6.4)	65.8 (18.8)
Daily mean °F (°C)	37.2 (2.9)	40.7 (4.8)	48.1 (8.9)	54.2 (12.3)	62.0 (16.7)	68.3 (20.2)	76.7 (24.8)	75.8 (24.3)	67.1 (19.5)	55.0 (12.8)	43.6 (6.4)	36.8 (2.7)	55.5 (13.1)
Mean daily minimum °F (°C)	30.3 (−0.9)	32.8 (0.4)	38.7 (3.7)	43.7 (6.5)	50.4 (10.2)	56.0 (13.3)	63.1 (17.3)	62.3 (16.8)	54.6 (12.6)	44.3 (6.8)	35.6 (2.0)	30.1 (−1.1)	45.2 (7.3)
Record low °F (°C)	−17 (−27)	−17 (−27)	6 (−14)	15 (−9)	25 (−4)	38 (3)	39 (4)	40 (4)	28 (−2)	13 (−11)	−12 (−24)	−24 (−31)	−24 (−31)
Average precipitation inches (mm)	1.75 (44)	1.52 (39)	1.70 (43)	1.62 (41)	1.77 (45)	1.25 (32)	0.34 (8.6)	0.39 (9.9)	0.61 (15)	1.22 (31)	1.92 (49)	2.06 (52)	16.15 (410)
Average snowfall inches (cm)	2.4 (6.1)	1.3 (3.3)	0.1 (0.25)	0.0 (0.0)	0.0 (0.0)	0.0 (0.0)	0.0 (0.0)	0.0 (0.0)	0.0 (0.0)	0.0 (0.0)	0.3 (0.76)	3.1 (7.9)	7.2 (18)
Average precipitation days (≥ 0.01 in)	10.2	9.1	9.6	8.6	7.5	5.6	1.7	1.6	3.0	6.3	10.0	10.2	83.4
Average snowy days (≥ 0.1 in)	1.1	0.4	0.2	0.0	0.0	0.0	0.0	0.0	0.0	0.0	0.4	0.8	2.9
Source: NOAA

== Demographics ==
Historical population
Census	Pop.	Note	%±
1960	4,110		—
1970	4,105		−0.1%
1980	5,086		23.9%
1990	5,533		8.8%
2000	6,470		16.9%
2010	7,050		9.0%
2020	7,151		1.4%
U.S. Decennial Census

=== 2020 census ===
As of the 2020 census, Milton-Freewater had a population of 7,151. The median age was 34.0 years. 26.9% of residents were under the age of 18 and 16.0% of residents were 65 years of age or older. For every 100 females there were 94.3 males, and for every 100 females age 18 and over there were 94.5 males age 18 and over.

99.9% of residents lived in urban areas, while 0.1% lived in rural areas.

There were 2,524 households in Milton-Freewater, of which 37.6% had children under the age of 18 living in them. Of all households, 43.1% were married-couple households, 20.1% were households with a male householder and no spouse or partner present, and 28.4% were households with a female householder and no spouse or partner present. About 27.0% of all households were made up of individuals and 12.2% had someone living alone who was 65 years of age or older.

There were 2,724 housing units, of which 7.3% were vacant. Among occupied housing units, 57.1% were owner-occupied and 42.9% were renter-occupied. The homeowner vacancy rate was 1.5% and the rental vacancy rate was 7.9%.

Racial composition as of the 2020 census
Race	Number	Percentage
White	4,007	56.0%
Black or African American	38	0.5%
American Indian and Alaska Native	91	1.3%
Asian	52	0.7%
Native Hawaiian and Other Pacific Islander	11	0.2%
Some other race	2,095	29.3%
Two or more races	857	12.0%
Hispanic or Latino (of any race)	3,271	45.7%

=== 2010 census ===
At the 2010 census, there were 7,050 people, 2,479 households and 1,689 families residing in the city. The population density was 3,542.7 inhabitants per square mile (1,367.8/km^{2}). There were 2,742 housing units at an average density of 1,377.9 per square mile (532.0/km^{2}). The racial makeup of the city was 70.9% White, 0.6% African American, 0.8% Native American, 0.6% Asian, 24.7% from other races, and 2.5% from two or more races. Hispanic or Latino of any race were 43.1% of the population.

There were 2,479 households, of which 40.1% had children under the age of 18 living with them, 48.4% were married couples living together, 13.0% had a female householder with no husband present, 6.7% had a male householder with no wife present, and 31.9% were non-families. 27.0% of all households were made up of individuals, and 12.5% had someone living alone who was 65 years of age or older. The average household size was 2.82 and the average family size was 3.42.

The median age was 31.5 years. 30.4% of residents were under the age of 18; 11% were between the ages of 18 and 24; 24.4% were from 25 to 44; 21.2% were from 45 to 64; and 13.1% were 65 years of age or older. The population was 49.4% male and 50.6% female.

== The Rocks AVA ==
The Milton-Freewater area is renowned for its wine. Until February 2015, it was part of the Walla Walla Valley AVA, when The Rocks District of Milton–Freewater American Viticultural Area (The Rocks AVA) was established.

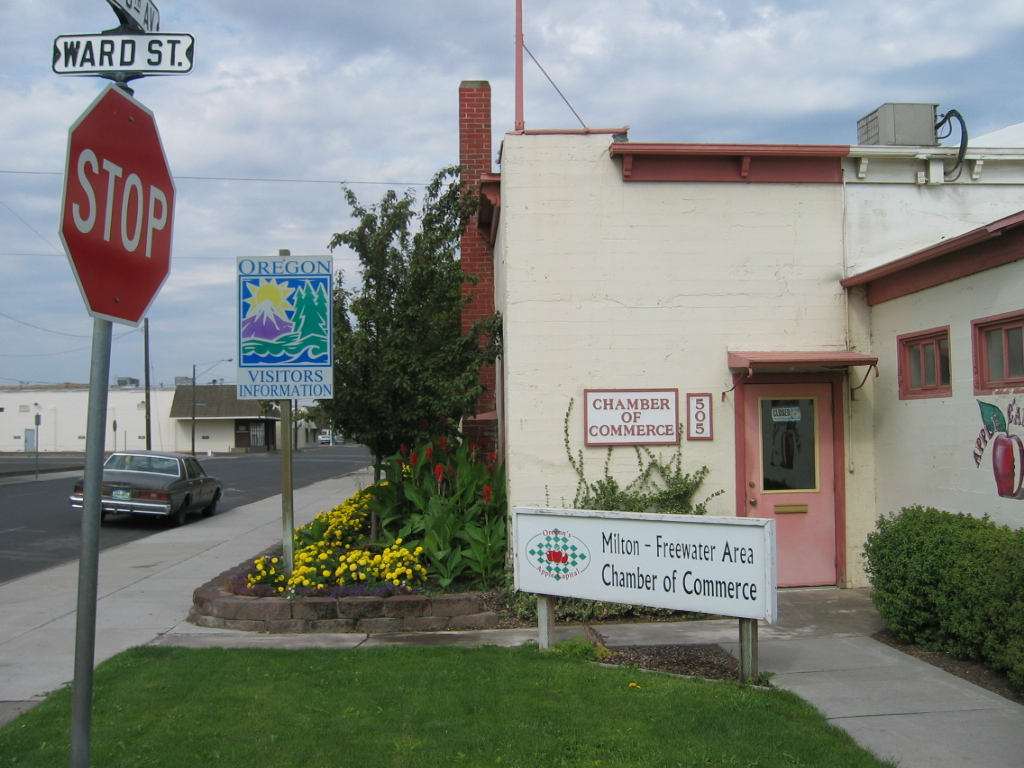
Milton-Freewater area Chamber of Commerce, downtown

== Education ==
Schools in Milton-Freewater are under the jurisdiction of the Milton-Freewater Unified School District and include McLoughlin High School, Central Middle School, Freewater Elementary, Ferndale Elementary School, Gib Olinger Elementary.

== Notable people ==
- George Flower, actor, writer and producer
- Oscar Harstad, former major league baseball pitcher

== Sister cities ==
- Waimate, New Zealand
