= National Register of Historic Places listings in Umatilla County, Oregon =

Location of Umatilla County in Oregon

This list presents the full set of buildings, structures, objects, sites, or districts designated on the National Register of Historic Places in Umatilla County, Oregon, United States, and offers brief descriptive information about each of them. The National Register recognizes places of national, state, or local historic significance across the United States. Out of over 90,000 National Register sites nationwide, Oregon is home to over 2,000, and 44 of those are found in Umatilla County.

This National Park Service list is complete through NPS recent listings posted May 1, 2026.

== Current listings ==
| | Name on the Register | Image | Date listed | Location | City or town | Description |
|---|---|---|---|---|---|---|
| 1 | Adams Odd Fellows Hall | Adams Odd Fellows Hall | August 5, 1994 (#94000810) | 190 Main St. 45°46′03″N 118°33′48″W | Adams | |
| 2 | Arlington Hotel | Arlington Hotel | August 28, 1997 (#97000897) | 131 W. Main St. 45°44′33″N 119°11′43″W | Echo | |
| 3 | Bank of Echo Building | Bank of Echo Building | April 15, 1982 (#82003747) | 230 W. Main St. 45°44′33″N 119°11′39″W | Echo | |
| 4 | Bowman Hotel | Bowman Hotel | November 6, 1980 (#80003381) | 17 SW Frazer Ave. 45°40′12″N 118°47′11″W | Pendleton | |
| 5 | Central School | Central School | October 20, 2010 (#10000849) | 306 SW 2nd Ave. 45°55′59″N 118°23′26″W | Milton-Freewater | |
| 6 | William J. and Lodema Clarke House | William J. and Lodema Clarke House | June 13, 1997 (#97000576) | 203 NW Despain Ave. 45°40′30″N 118°47′22″W | Pendleton | |
| 7 | Columbia College | Columbia College | January 21, 2004 (#03001481) | 722 S. Main St. 45°55′43″N 118°23′07″W | Milton-Freewater | |
| 8 | Joseph Cunha Farmstead | Joseph Cunha Farmstead | August 28, 1997 (#97000898) | 33263 Oregon Trail Rd. 45°44′29″N 119°12′05″W | Echo | |
| 9 | Echo City Hall | Echo City Hall | August 28, 1997 (#97000899) | 20 S. Bonanza St. 45°44′31″N 119°11′39″W | Echo | |
| 10 | Echo Methodist Church | Echo Methodist Church | August 28, 1997 (#97000900) | 1 N. Bonanza St. 45°44′34″N 119°11′41″W | Echo | Originally built in 1886 a simple New England vernacular style, this church was expanded and transformed into the Gothic Revival style in 1910. It is the best example of Gothic Revival construction in the Echo area. |
| 11 | James Edwards Building | James Edwards Building | August 28, 1997 (#97000901) | 320 W. Main St. 45°44′32″N 119°11′34″W | Echo | |
| 12 | J.L. Elam Bank | J.L. Elam Bank | August 29, 2024 (#100010807) | 601 N. Main Street; 45°56′32″N 118°23′51″W | Milton-Freewater | |
| 13 | Ellis–Hampton House | Ellis–Hampton House | October 23, 1986 (#86002909) | 711 SE Byers Ave. 45°40′31″N 118°46′48″W | Pendleton | |
| 14 | Empire Block | Empire Block | June 1, 1982 (#82003748) | 21–37 SW Emigrant Ave. 45°40′14″N 118°47′13″W | Pendleton | |
| 15 | Williams Frazier Farmstead | Williams Frazier Farmstead | June 5, 1986 (#86001234) | 1403 Chestnut St. 45°55′24″N 118°22′36″W | Milton-Freewater | |
| 16 | Greasewood Finnish Apostolic Lutheran Church | Greasewood Finnish Apostolic Lutheran Church | July 14, 1988 (#88001041) | Finn Rd. at Finland Cemetery Rd. 45°46′32″N 118°39′47″W | Adams | |
| 17 | Hamley and Company Leather Goods Store | Hamley and Company Leather Goods Store | June 9, 1982 (#82003749) | 30 SE Court Ave. 45°40′22″N 118°47′12″W | Pendleton | |
| 18 | Hendricks Building (K.O.T.M.) | Hendricks Building (K.O.T.M.) | June 1, 1982 (#82003750) | 369 S. Main St. 45°40′14″N 118°47′12″W | Pendleton | |
| 19 | Sarah E. Ireland House | Sarah E. Ireland House | January 21, 1994 (#93001500) | 311 S. Main St. 45°55′56″N 118°23′10″W | Milton-Freewater | |
| 20 | Johnson–Ellis House | Johnson–Ellis House | March 14, 1986 (#86000347) | 326 SE 2nd St. 45°40′19″N 118°47′04″W | Pendleton | |
| 21 | J. H. Koontz Building | J. H. Koontz Building | August 28, 1997 (#97000902) | 111 W. Main St. 45°44′33″N 119°11′44″W | Echo | |
| 22 | James H. and Cynthia Koontz House | James H. and Cynthia Koontz House | August 28, 1997 (#97000903) | 210 N. Dupont St. 45°44′41″N 119°11′44″W | Echo | |
| 23 | LaDow Block | LaDow Block | October 22, 1992 (#92001381) | 201–239 SE Court Ave. 45°40′25″N 118°47′07″W | Pendleton | |
| 24 | Masonic Temple | Masonic Temple | June 1, 1982 (#82003751) | 18 SW Emigrant Ave. 45°40′13″N 118°47′11″W | Pendleton | |
| 25 | Matlock–Brownfield Building | Matlock–Brownfield Building | June 1, 1982 (#82003752) | 413–425 S. Main St. 45°40′13″N 118°47′11″W | Pendleton | |
| 26 | Meacham Hotel | Meacham Hotel | August 6, 2002 (#01000830) | Main St. 45°30′28″N 118°25′10″W | Meacham | |
| 27 | Milarkey Building | Milarkey Building | September 23, 1982 (#82003753) | 203 S. Main St. 45°40′21″N 118°47′16″W | Pendleton | |
| 28 | Reese and Redman General Merchandise Store | Reese and Redman General Merchandise Store | August 8, 1994 (#94000811) | 130 S. Main St. 45°45′59″N 118°33′44″W | Adams | |
| 29 | Gonzalez M. and Maude R. Rice House | Gonzalez M. and Maude R. Rice House | February 11, 2021 (#100006126) | 503 N. Main St. 45°40′37″N 118°47′23″W | Pendleton | |
| 30 | St. Peter's Roman Catholic Church | St. Peter's Roman Catholic Church | August 28, 1997 (#97000905) | Junction of Marble St. and Leezer Ave. 45°44′23″N 119°12′05″W | Echo | |
| 31 | Isham Saling House | Isham Saling House | January 1, 1976 (#76001590) | 314 N. Water St. 45°49′01″N 118°25′26″W | Weston | |
| 32 | Edgar Sommerville House | Edgar Sommerville House | October 14, 1980 (#80003382) | 104 SE 5th St. 45°40′29″N 118°46′58″W | Pendleton | |
| 33 | South Main Street Commercial Historic District | South Main Street Commercial Historic District | October 10, 1986 (#86003260) | Roughly bounded by Dorion Ave., SE 1st St., Union Pacific Railroad, and SW 2nd St. 45°40′14″N 118°47′10″W | Pendleton | |
| 34 | Still–Perkins House | Still–Perkins House | September 9, 1993 (#93000925) | 112 SE 6th Ave. 45°55′49″N 118°22′59″W | Milton-Freewater | |
| 35 | Umatilla County Library | Umatilla County Library | August 15, 1997 (#97000848) | 214 N. Main St. 45°40′28″N 118°47′19″W | Pendleton | |
| 36 | Umatilla Masonic Lodge Hall | Umatilla Masonic Lodge Hall | August 28, 1997 (#97000906) | 20 S. Dupont St. 45°44′30″N 119°11′47″W | Echo | |
| 37 | Umatilla Site (35UM1) | Umatilla Site (35UM1) | January 30, 1981 (#81000522) | Address restricted | Umatilla | The prehistoric component of this archeological site dates to 470 BCE and earlier, and may represent the largest such site in Oregon. Remains found include pit houses, stone and bone art objects, burials, and extensive animal remains, and are associated with the origins of seasonal sedentism around fishing opportunities. The site may also yield useful evidence of the historical period of the town of Umatilla. |
| 38 | U.S. Post Office and Courthouse | U.S. Post Office and Courthouse | March 4, 1985 (#85000544) | 104 SW Dorion Ave. 45°40′16″N 118°47′17″W | Pendleton | |
| 39 | Joseph Vey House | Joseph Vey House | February 27, 1986 (#86000299) | 1304 SE Court Pl. 45°40′25″N 118°46′20″W | Pendleton | |
| 40 | Walla Walla Valley Traction Company Passenger Station and Powerhouse | Walla Walla Valley Traction Company Passenger Station and Powerhouse | September 9, 1993 (#93000926) | 403 Robbins St. 45°56′26″N 118°23′46″W | Milton-Freewater | |
| 41 | M. L. Watts House | M. L. Watts House | March 9, 1988 (#88000090) | 4th at Jefferson St. 45°48′47″N 118°29′16″W | Athena | |
| 42 | Weston Commercial Historic District | Weston Commercial Historic District | October 5, 1982 (#82001515) | E. Main St. between Water and Broad St. 45°48′49″N 118°25′27″W | Weston | |
| 43 | Weston School | Weston School | December 30, 2011 (#11000976) | 205 E. Wallace St. 45°48′44″N 118°25′24″W | Weston | |
| 44 | Winn Barn | Winn Barn | December 30, 2011 (#11000977) | 79560 Winn Rd. 45°50′25″N 118°24′19″W | Weston vicinity | |

== See also ==
- National Register of Historic Places listings in Oregon
- Listings in neighboring counties: Benton, Columbia, Grant, Morrow, Union, Walla Walla, Wallowa
- Historic preservation
- History of Oregon
- Lists of Oregon-related topics
