= Arlington Hotel (Echo, Oregon) =

- U.S. National Register of Historic Places
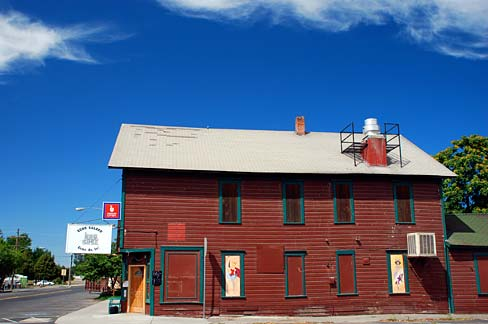
- The Arlington Hotel in 2010

- Location within Oregon Location within the United States
- Location: 131 W. Main St. Echo, Oregon
- Coordinates: 45°44′33″N 119°11′43″W
- Area: 0.2 acres (0.081 ha)
- Built: c. 1882
- Built by: J.H. Koontz
- Architectural style: Late Victorian, Vernacular
- MPS: Echo and The Meadows MPS 64500503
- NRHP reference No.: 97000897
- Added to NRHP: 28 August 1997

The Arlington Hotel also known as the Echo Tavern and the Echo Hotel, Restaurant and Lounge is a historic building in Echo, Oregon.

== Description and history ==
The 2 1/2-story wood-frame building is of vernacular construction. The 28-by-66-foot (8.5 by 20.1 m) main mass of the building has a rectangular plan with a gable roof and simple details. There have been two additions to the structure one historic and another recent. It originally operated as saloon and hotel. Originally called the Louvre Saloon rooms included "sample rooms" for salesmen to display their goods. An undertaker used the top floor who left behind coffins that were found decades later. The hotel also operated under the name Arlington House.

Built between 1882 and 1886 by James H. Koontz, founder of Echo, the Arlington Hotel is one of the oldest extant buildings in town and one of the few large historic wood-frame buildings that remain in Umatilla County. The time of the construction coincides with the primary period of development for the Echo. Koontz moved there in 1880 and filed the first plat for Echo that year with W.D. Brassfield. In 1884 there were 15 businesses in town. Koontz, a merchant, had moved to the location anticipating the shift from river to rail transport.

The property was added to the National Register of Historic Places on August 28, 1997. In 2008 Echo Saloon LLC held a liquor license for the Echo Saloon.

== See also ==
- History of Oregon
- History of rail transportation in the United States
- National Register of Historic Places listings in Umatilla County, Oregon
- Oregon Country
