= Stella Paulu =

American politician

Stella Paulu was an American politician, councilwoman, and second female mayor of Umatilla elected through the Petticoat Revolution in 1916. In 1918, she succeeded Laura Stockton Starcher as mayor. The group made major improvements in public services and infrastructure of the city.

Both Paulu and Starcher were recognized by local museums in Umatilla for the revolution which resulted in years of improved leadership, management, and quality of life for both men and women in the area.
