= Weston High School =

Weston High School is the name of several public and independent secondary schools in Canada and the United States:

- Weston High School (Connecticut) in Weston, Connecticut
- Weston High School (Louisiana) in unincorporated Jackson Parish, Louisiana
- Weston High School (Massachusetts) in Weston, Massachusetts
- Weston High School (Greenville, Mississippi), in Greenville, Mississippi
- Weston High School (Arlington, Washington)
- Weston High School (West Virginia) in Weston, West Virginia
- Weston High School (Cazenovia, Wisconsin)
- Weston Collegiate Institute, known as Weston High School from 1871 to 1922 in the neighborhood of Weston, York, Toronto, Ontario
- Weston High School in Weston, Oregon, merged to form Weston-McEwen High School of the Athena Weston School District in Athena, Oregon
