= Laura Stockton Starcher =

First female mayor of Umatilla

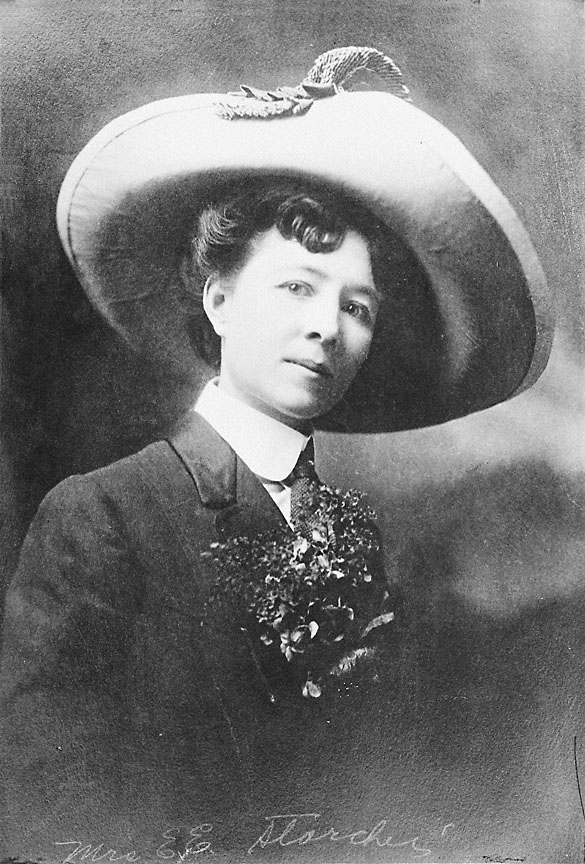
Starcher in 1917

Laura Stockton Starcher (d. 1960) was the first female mayor in Umatilla, Oregon, elected through the Petticoat Revolution in 1916. She was the wife of incumbent mayor E. E. Starcher, and was elected by a vote of 26–8. Her husband only discovered she was his opponent on the afternoon of election day.

== Career ==
She served less than a year in office and was succeeded by councilwoman Stella Paulu, who replaced her as mayor in 1918. Other remaining members of the Petticoat Government helped make significant improvements to the town's infrastructure in the next four years of their governance.

After her term as mayor, she may have run a beauty salon and delivered mail in Parma, Idaho. In her first public address, she promised to appoint a new female police marshal citing her reasons as, "[w]e will not leave the enforcement of our laws to any man, because past experience has proven the laws will not be strictly enforced."

Starcher died in 1960 and was buried in Parma Cemetery in Idaho.
