= Echo City Hall =

Historic building in Echo, Oregon, U.S.

- U.S. National Register of Historic Places
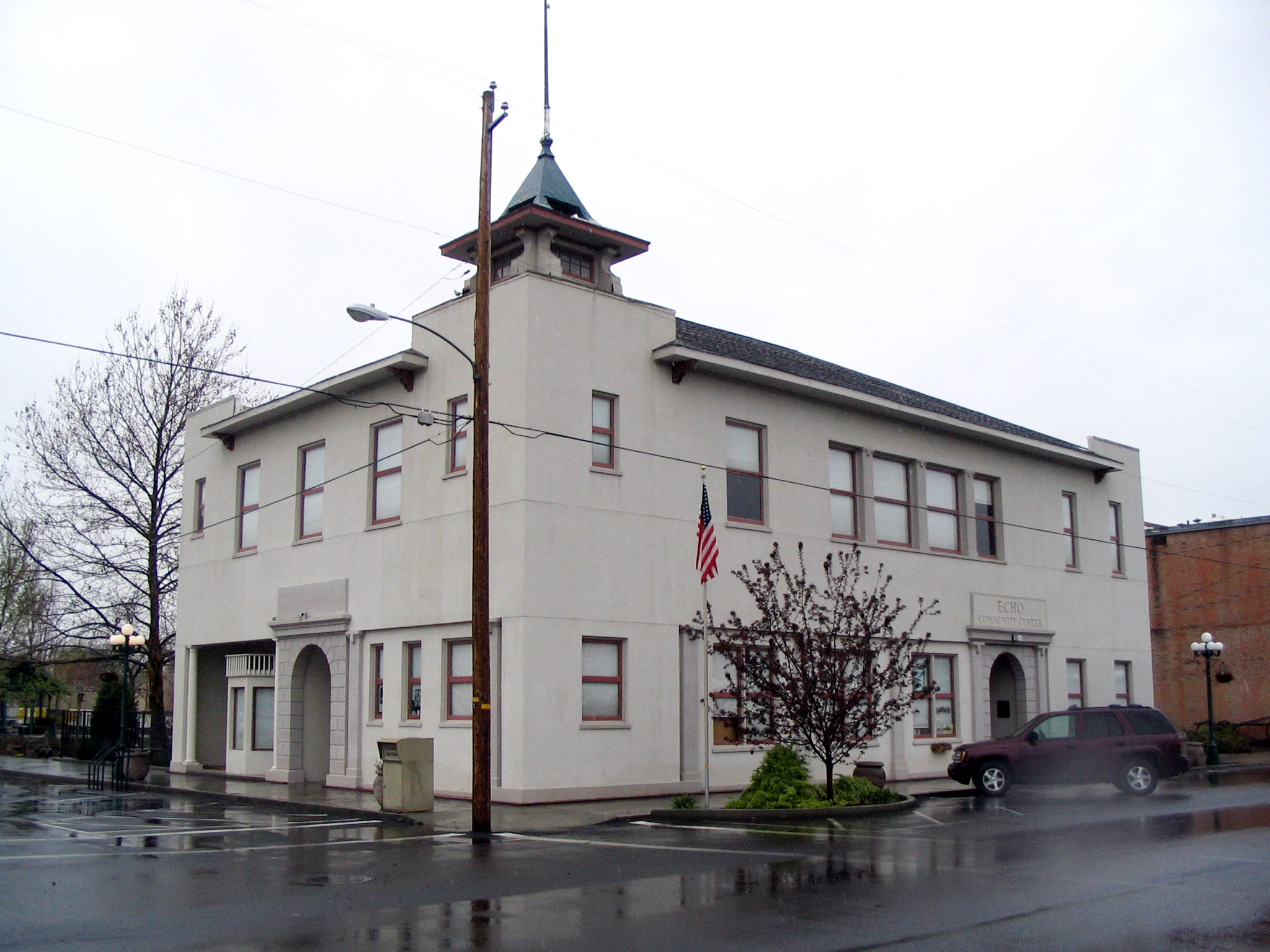
- The building's exterior in 2006

- Location within Oregon Location within the United States
- Location: 20 S. Bonanza St., Echo, Oregon
- Coordinates: 45°44′31″N 119°11′39″W
- Area: 0.2 acres (0.081 ha)
- Built: 1916
- Architect: John Tourtellotee
- Architectural style: Beaux Arts, Bungalow/craftsman
- MPS: Echo and The Meadows MPS
- NRHP reference No.: 97000899
- Added to NRHP: August 28, 1997

Echo City Hall is an historic building in Echo, Oregon, United States. The building is listed on the National Register of Historic Places.

== History ==
Echo City Hall was constructed in 1915 to 1916 by contractor C.F. Kratz, of Portland and designed by architect John Tourtellote of Portland firm Tourtellote and Hummel.

== See also ==
- National Register of Historic Places listings in Umatilla County, Oregon
