= Echo Methodist Church =

Historic church in Oregon, United States

- U.S. National Register of Historic Places
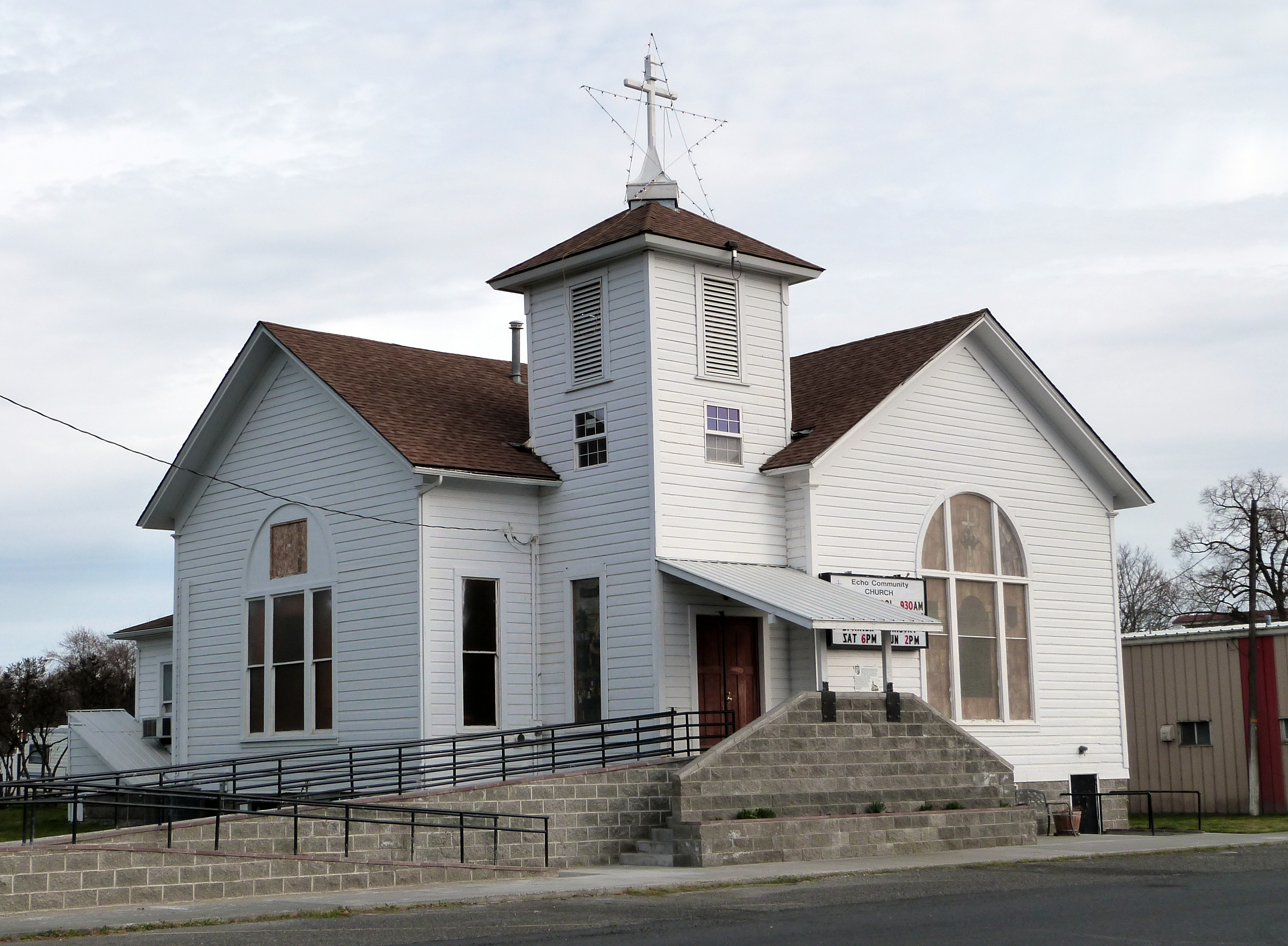
- Echo Methodist Church in 2013
- Location: 1 N. Bonanza Street; Echo, Oregon
- Coordinates: 45°44′34″N 119°11′41″W
- Area: 0.15 acres (0.061 ha)
- Built: 1886 (original); 1910 (expansion)
- Architectural style: Gothic Revival
- MPS: City of Echo and The Meadows Historic Resources MPS
- NRHP reference No.: 97000900
- Added to NRHP: August 28, 1997

Echo Methodist Church is a church and historic church building in Echo, Oregon, Oregon, United States. Originally built in 1886 a simple New England vernacular style, it was expanded and transformed into the Gothic Revival style in 1910. It is the best example of Gothic Revival construction in the Echo area. As Echo's only Protestant church, built two years after the railroad arrived in town, its history also reflects changes in transportation and agriculture in the area.

The church's name has varied over time. It was Echo Methodist Episcopal Church when it was founded in 1886, became Echo Community Methodist Church in 1946, and was Echo Methodist Church by 1996. As of 2013, the church was named Echo Community Church.

The church was added to the National Register of Historic Places in 1997.

== See also ==
- National Register of Historic Places listings in Umatilla County, Oregon
