= Umatilla Masonic Lodge Hall =

- U.S. National Register of Historic Places
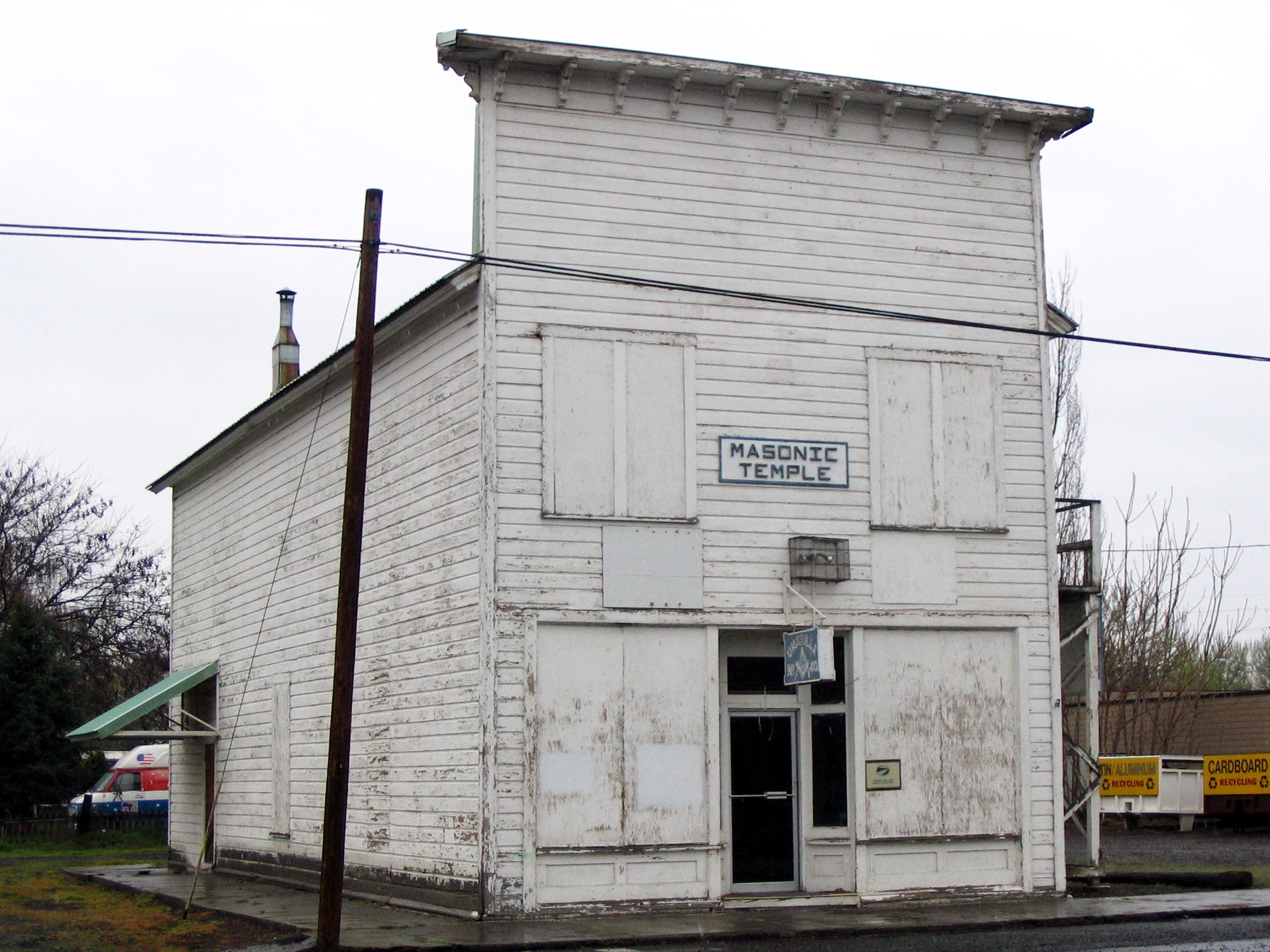
- The Umatilla Masonic Lodge Hall in 2006
- Location: 20 S. Dupont Street (Note: The Umatilla Masonic Lodge Hall was originally entered on the National Register with an address at 200 S. Dupont Street in Echo. This error was corrected by the National Park Service in a subsequent listing announcement.); Echo, Oregon
- Coordinates: 45°44′30″N 119°11′47″W
- Area: 0.11 acres (0.045 ha)
- Built: 1868 (construction); 1901 (relocation to Echo)
- Architectural style: Italianate, Western false front
- MPS: Echo and The Meadows MPS
- NRHP reference No.: 97000906
- Added to NRHP: August 28, 1997

The Umatilla Masonic Lodge Hall is a Masonic building in Echo, Oregon. It is one of the oldest edifices in Umatilla County and is listed on the National Register of Historic Places. The hall was built in Umatilla City in 1868 and disassembled and moved by railroad to its present location in Echo in 1901, after Umatilla City declined economically due in part to railroad development. It was deemed significant for association with development of rail transportation in Echo and Meadows area. And it was deemed significant as "an excellent example of an Italianate False Front style building".

It was listed on the National Register of Historic Places in 1997.

== See also ==
- National Register of Historic Places listings in Umatilla County, Oregon
