= St. Peter's Roman Catholic Church (Echo, Oregon) =

Historic church in Oregon, United States

- U.S. National Register of Historic Places
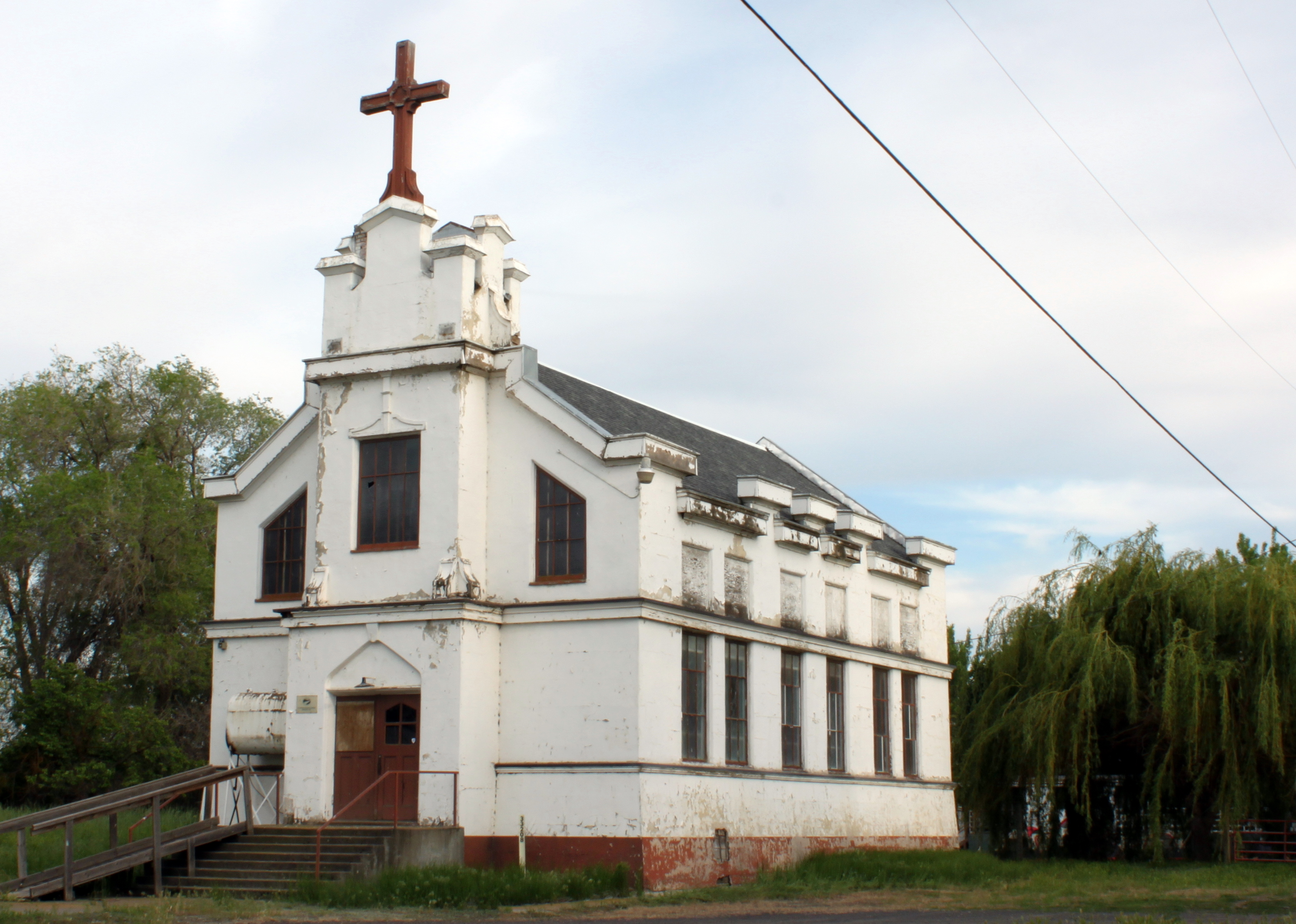
- St. Peter's Roman Catholic Church in 2009
- Location: Intersection of Marble Street and Leezer Avenue; Echo, Oregon
- Coordinates: 45°44′23″N 119°12′05″W
- Area: 0.22 acres (0.089 ha)
- Built: 1913
- Built by: Carl Searchermeyer
- Architect: C. M. Himebaugh
- Architectural style: Spanish (Portuguese) Colonial Revival
- MPS: City of Echo and The Meadows Historic Resources MPS
- NRHP reference No.: 97000905
- Added to NRHP: August 28, 1997

St. Peter's Roman Catholic Church is a historic church building in Echo, Oregon, United States. The church was built by the Portuguese immigrant community in Echo.

The church was added to the National Register of Historic Places in 1997.

The Echo Heritage Association, an Oregon registered, IRS 501 c 3 public non-profit, works to preserve and restore this uniquely beautiful landmark. Further information is on their webpage at: www.echoheritage.org

Restoration Group Newsletter

== See also ==
- National Register of Historic Places listings in Umatilla County, Oregon
