= Umatilla Site =

Historic place in Oregon, United States

- Umatilla Site (35UM1)
- U.S. National Register of Historic Places
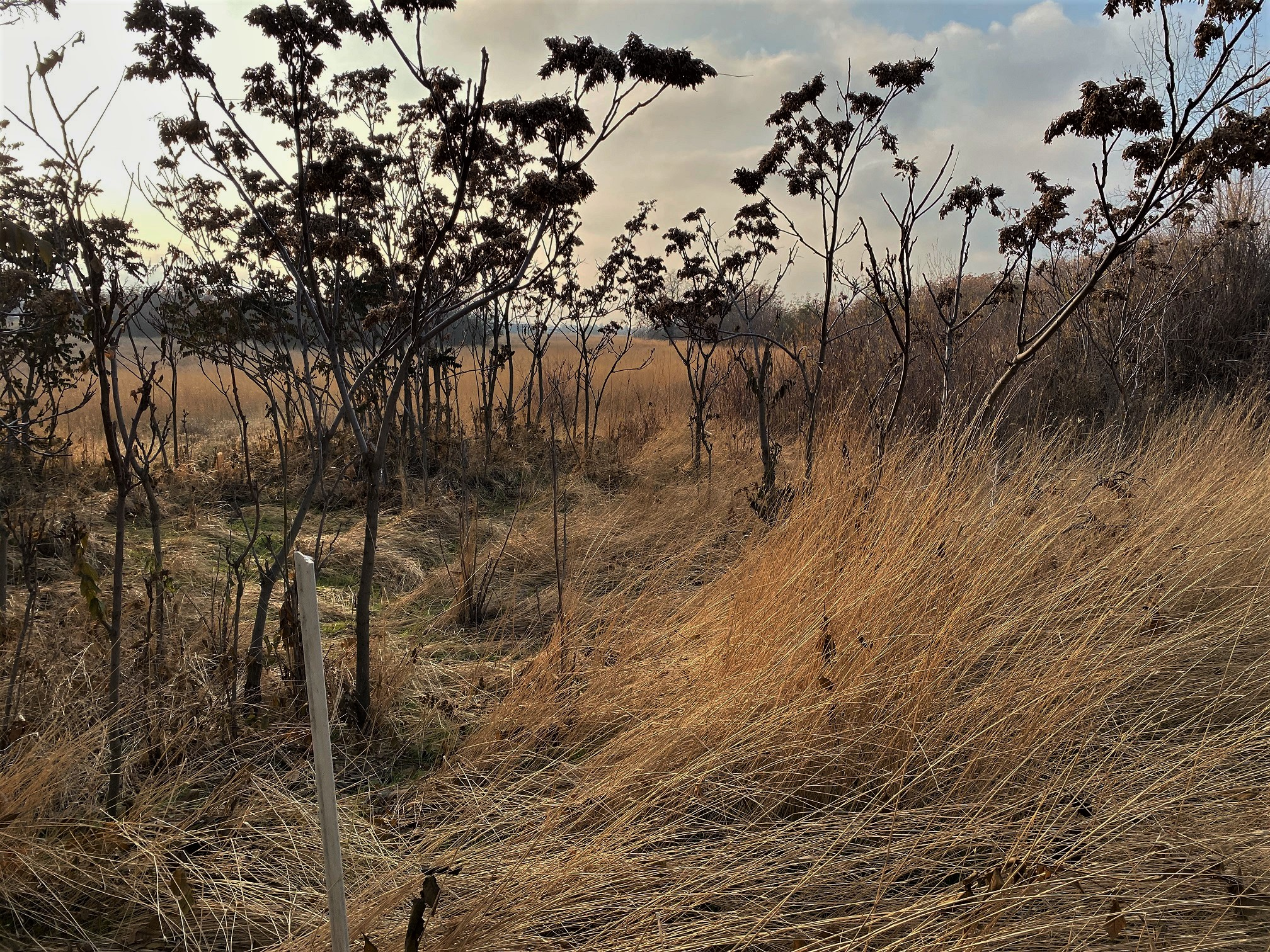
- Location: Address restricted
- Nearest city: Umatilla, Oregon
- Area: 261 acres (106 ha)
- NRHP reference No.: 81000522
- Added to NRHP: January 30, 1981

The Umatilla Site (Smithsonian trinomial: 35UM1 and 35UM35) is an archaeological site near Umatilla, Oregon, United States. Situated on the shores of the Columbia River, the prehistoric component of the site is associated with the origins of seasonal (winter) sedentism around fishing opportunities. Pit houses at Umatilla date to at least 470 BCE, and significant evidence is present of occupations earlier than the pit houses. Other remains found include stone and bone art objects, burials, and extensive animal remains. The total set of remains may represent the largest prehistoric site in Oregon by area. The site may also yield useful evidence of the historical period of the town of Umatilla, founded over the prehistoric remains in the 1860s as a gold mining supply base and relocated in 1967 in connection with the construction of the John Day Dam.

The Umatilla Site was listed on the National Register of Historic Places in 1981.

== See also ==
- National Register of Historic Places listings in Umatilla County, Oregon
