= Masonic Temple (Pendleton, Oregon) =

- U.S. National Register of Historic Places
- U.S. Historic district – Contributing property
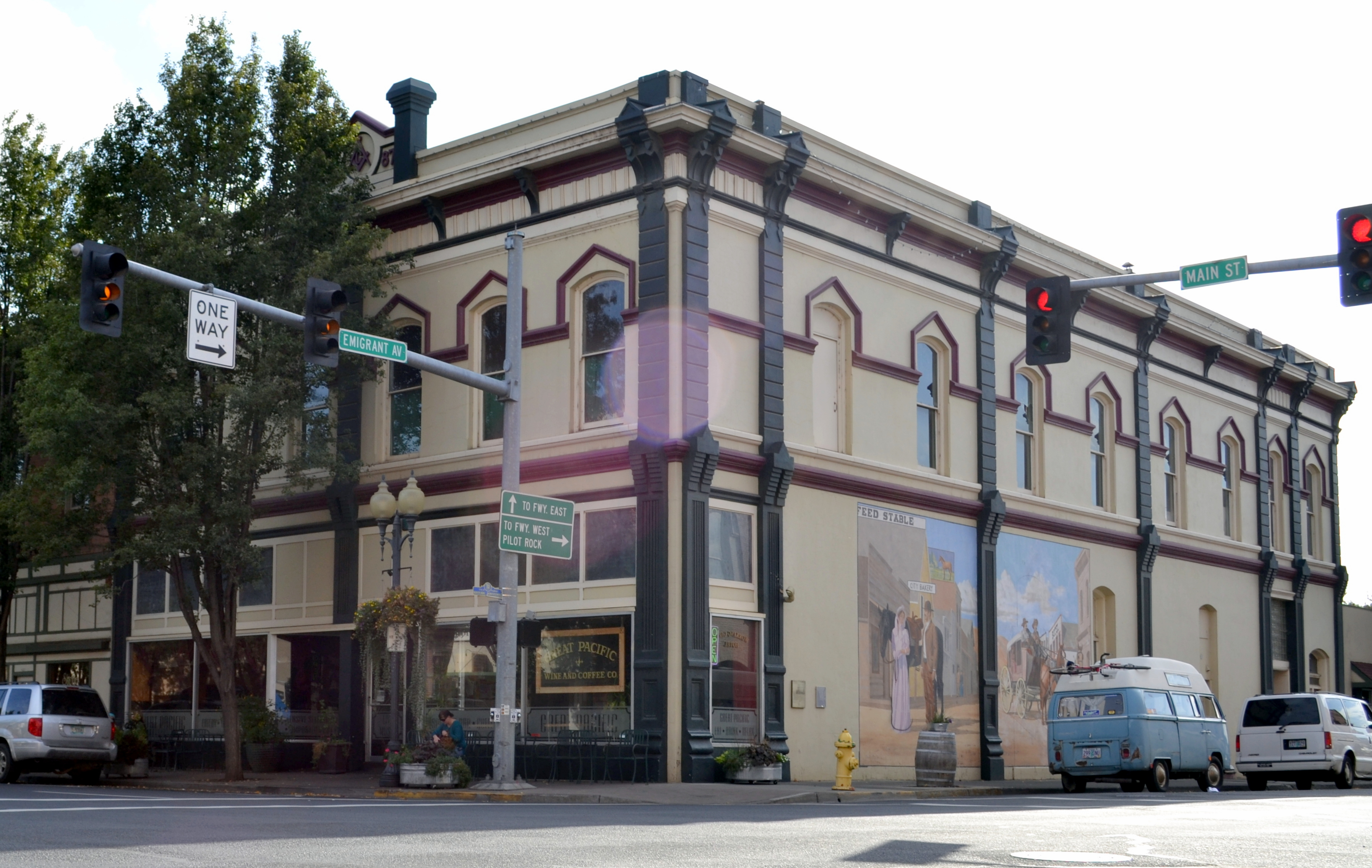

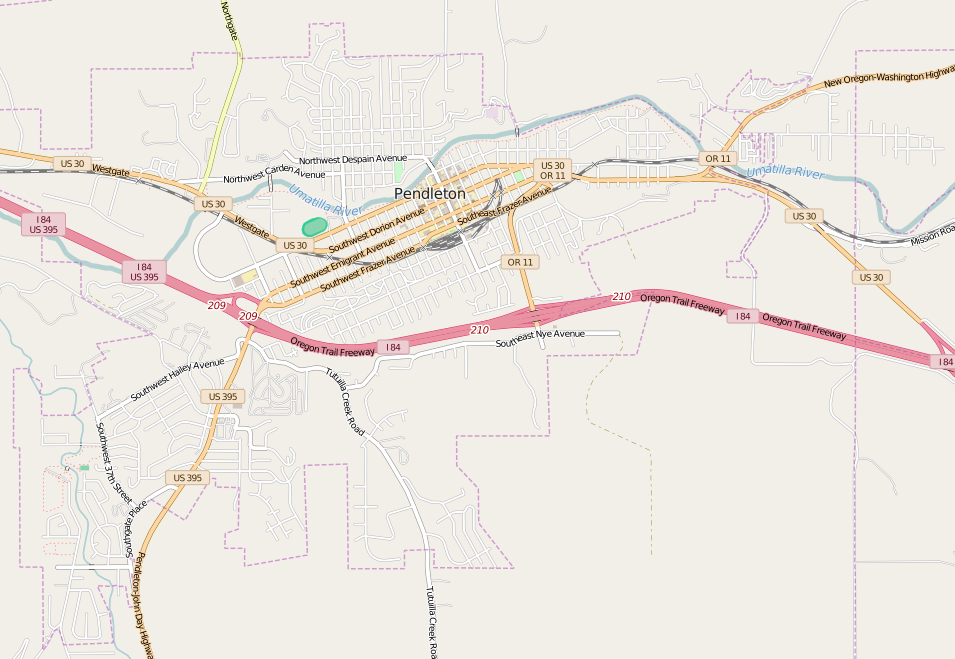
- Location within Pendleton OR Location within Oregon
- Location: 18 SW Emigrant Avenue; Pendleton, Oregon
- Coordinates: 45°40′13″N 118°47′11″W
- Area: less than one acre
- Built: 1887
- Architects: Neer, D. Delos
- Architectural style: Italianate, High Victorian Italianate
- Part of: South Main Street Commercial Historic District (ID86003260)
- NRHP reference No.: 82003751
- Added to NRHP: June 01, 1982

The Masonic Temple in Pendleton, Oregon is a historic building constructed in 1887. It was originally built as a meeting hall for Pendleton Lodge (a local Masonic lodge), with commercial space on the ground floor to help offset the cost of maintaining the meeting hall. It was listed on the National Register of Historic Places in 1982. Since its listing, the lodge had moved to a new building.

== See also ==
- National Register of Historic Places listings in Umatilla County, Oregon
