= Weston-McEwen High School =

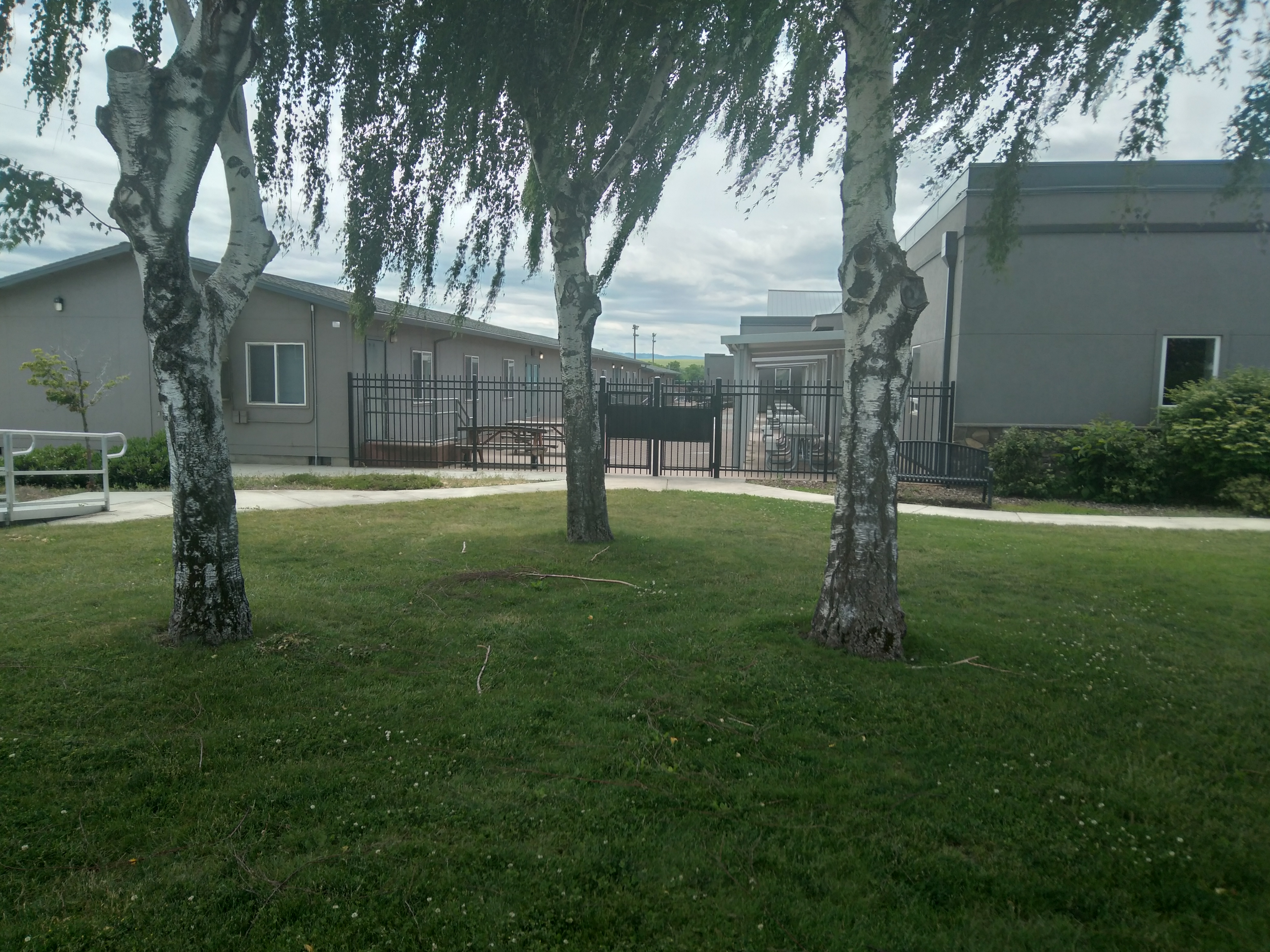

Location
- 540 E. Main; Athena, (Umatilla County), Oregon 97813; United States
- Coordinates: 45.811294°N 118.48598°W

Information
- School district: Athena Weston School District
- Principal: Morgan Rauch
- Staff: 16.97 (FTE)
- Grades: 9-12
- Enrollment: 215 (2022–2023)
- Student to teacher ratio: 12.67
- Campus: Rural
- Colors: Black and red
- Athletics conference: OSAA Columbia Basin Conference
- Mascot: Tiger and a Scottie Dog
- Team name: TigerScots
- Website: wmhs.athwest.k12.or.us

Weston-McEwen High School is a public high school in Athena, Oregon, United States that is known for its pipe band.

== History ==
Athena Weston School District was created in the 1970s with the merger of when the Athena and Weston school districts merged. Weston High School and McEwen High School were also merged, along with their respective mascots, the Tiger and the Scottie Dog, to form the new mascot, the "TigerScot".

== Academics ==
In 2008, 84% of the school's seniors received their high school diploma. Of 43 students, 36 graduated, three dropped out, and four were still in high school the following year.

== Pipe band ==
The Weston-McEwen Pipes, Drums, and Military Band began as a girls' pep band and highland dancing team in the early 1950s. A girls' pep band was organized at McEwen High School in Athena. Attempting to continue the community's Scottish heritage, six girls were selected annually as a highland dancing team. Called the "Highland Lassies", they performed the Highland Fling with the school band at sports events. In 1958, the group acquired a set of pipes. In 1972, the group was transformed into a full-fledged pipes and drums unit. In 1980, the first male players joined and the group's name was officially changed to the Weston-McEwen Pipes and Drums.
