= Petticoat Revolution =

1916 elections in Umatilla, Oregon, U.S.

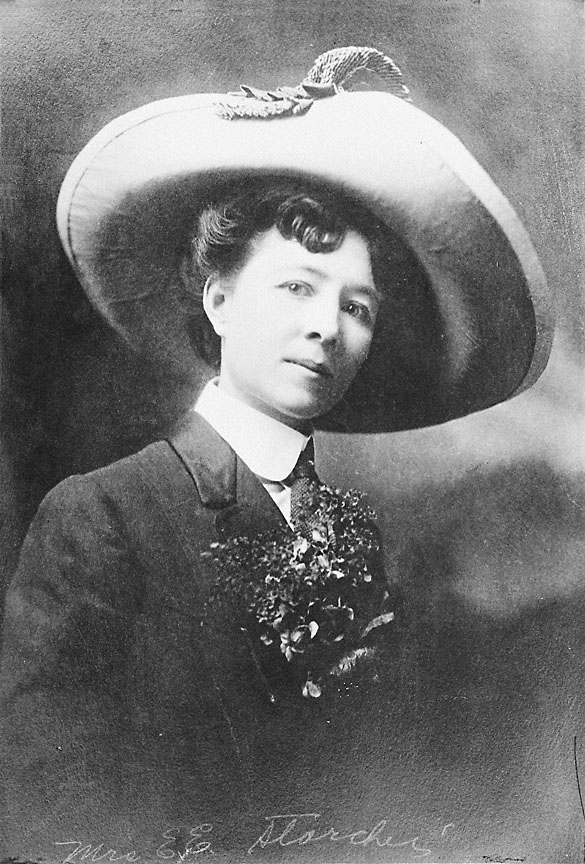
Laura Stockton Starcher, elected Mayor of Umatilla in 1916

The Petticoat Revolution was the name given by some contemporary newspapers to the December 5, 1916, municipal elections in Umatilla, Oregon, United States, in which seven women led secret campaigns to gain control of most town government offices. After successfully capturing the mayorship and a majority of council seats, the female-led administration implemented several infrastructure reforms with the intention of reversing the town's decline into disrepair.

== Background ==
Women had received the right to vote in Oregon four years earlier, in 1912. Upset by the deteriorating condition of the town and lax law enforcement, Lola and Robert Merrick invited seven women to a card game at their house and encouraged them to run for office. They secretly spread word to others, while keeping their candidacies a secret even from their own husbands.

== Election ==
Because turnout in the town's elections was typically low, and candidates were not required to declare their candidacy in advance, the women were able to capture the positions of mayor, treasurer, auditor, and all four of the six city council seats up for election. Laura Jane Stockton Starcher, wife of incumbent mayor E.E. Starcher, was elected mayor by a vote of 26–8, even as her husband only discovered that she was running on the afternoon of election day.

The newly elected women were:

- Mayor: Laura Stockton Starcher
- Treasurer: Lola Merrick
- Auditor: Betha Cherry
- Councilor: Florence Brownell
- Councilor: H.C. Means
- Councilor: Gladys Spinning
- Councilor: Stella Paulu

The election received national attention, including for Mayor Starcher's inaugural address, which was described by the New York Herald as a satirical speech "largely devoted to a skillful dissection of mere man’s foibles, weaknesses, faults, shortcomings, vices, general uselessness, and worthlessness."

== Administration ==
The new administration took office in January 1917 and undertook several reforms aimed at cleaning up the town, opened a library, and appointed women to several law-enforcement posts.

Starcher served eight months before suffering a nervous breakdown, and leaving office. The city council appointed a new woman as mayor, H.T. Duncan, only for her to resign after a month, and then appointed the newly elected councilwoman Stella Paulu to serve the remainder of Starcher's original term. Paulu was reelected in her own right with about 80% of the vote in an open campaign in 1918 for a full two-year term.

== Legacy ==
None of the women originally elected in 1916 sought reelection in 1920, and after the 1920 election all of the town's offices were again held by men. A similar secret campaign created an all-female city council in Yoncalla, Oregon, and replaced the unsuspecting mayor with his wife in 1920. In 1933, Bertha Cherry, who was elected auditor in 1916, successfully ran for Mayor of Umatilla.

The election is noted at a museum in Umatilla, and formed the basis for a 2004 children's book and a local play called "Operation Clean Sweep."
