= Athena, Oregon =

Athena
- City
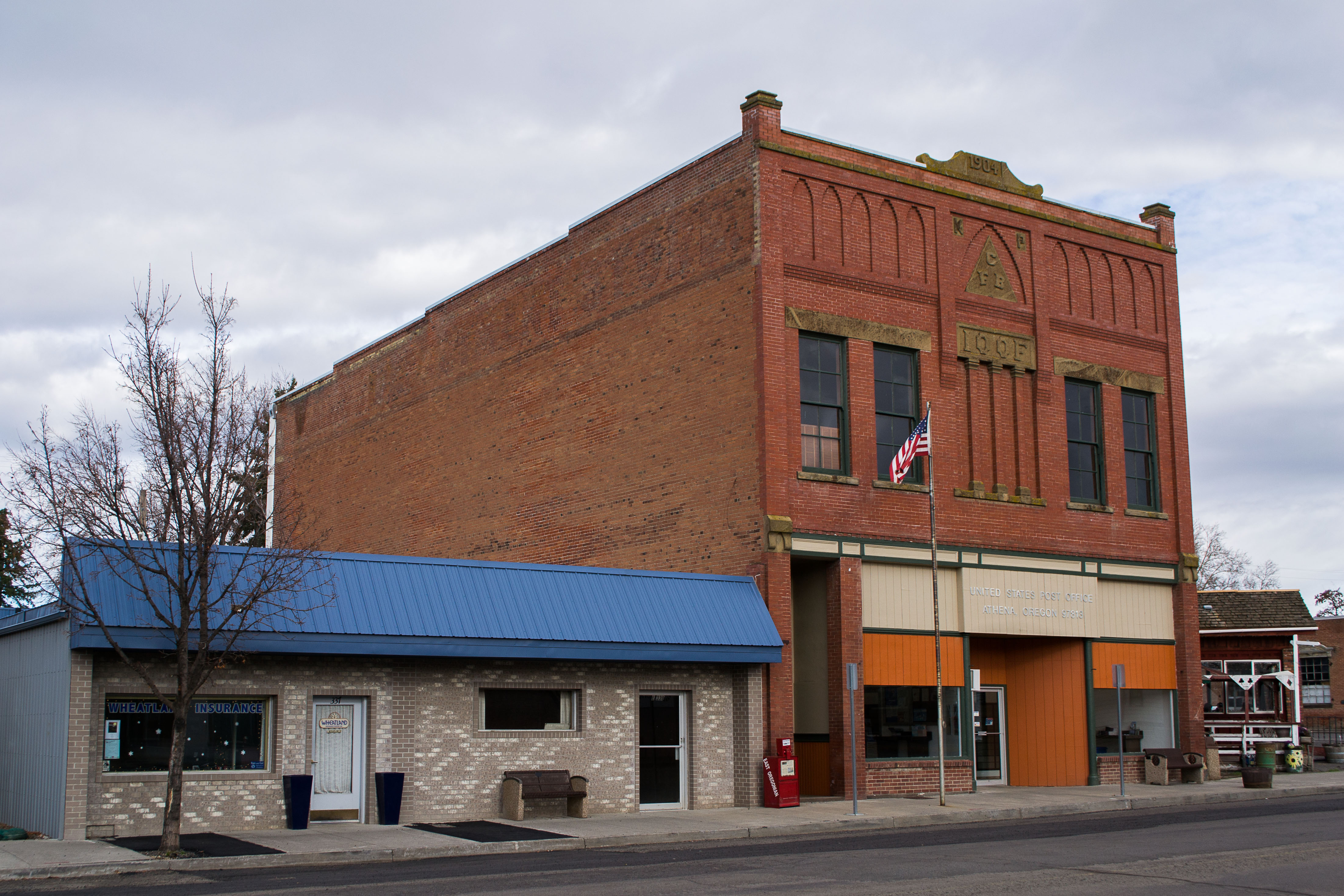
- Motto: "A Great Place to Live"
- Location in Oregon
- Coordinates: 45°48′41″N 118°29′38″W
- Country: United States
- State: Oregon
- County: Umatilla
- Incorporated: 1904

Government
  - Mayor: Becky Schroeder

Area
  - Total: 0.55 sq mi (1.42 km^{2})
  - Land: 0.55 sq mi (1.42 km^{2})
  - Water: 0 sq mi (0.00 km^{2})
- Elevation: 1,719 ft (524 m)

Population (2020)
  - Total: 1,209
  - Density: 2,203.9/sq mi (850.92/km^{2})
- Time zone: UTC-8 (Pacific)
  - Summer (DST): UTC-7 (Pacific)
- ZIP code: 97813
- Area code: 541
- FIPS code: 41-03200
- GNIS feature ID: 2409746
- Website: cityofathena.com

Athena is a city in Umatilla County, Oregon, United States. As of the 2020 census, Athena had a population of 1,209. It is part of the Hermiston-Pendleton Micropolitan Statistical Area.

== History ==
Athena, about halfway between Pendleton, Oregon, and Walla Walla, Washington, was originally called Centerville. However, confusion about the name sometimes arose because Oregon had another Centerville, in Washington County, and the state of Washington had a Centerville, in Klickitat County. In 1889, local government officials asked the Centerville school principal, D. W. Jarvis, to recommend a different name. He chose Athena after the Greek goddess, and they agreed.

Centerville got its first post office on October 11, 1878. The first postmaster was William T. Cook. The post office name was changed to Athena on May 16, 1889.

Nineteenth-century settlers of Scottish descent brought to Athena an interest in the customs and music of Scotland. Before World War I, Athena had a Caledonian Society that held an annual picnic featuring Scottish dancing and bagpipes. McEwen High School in Athena (now Weston-McEwen High School) revived the tradition in the 1950s when it organized a Scots dance group and a pipe band. The band has since performed at many venues in the United States and has traveled to Scotland and England to play. The Athena Caledonian Games languished during World War I but were re-established in 1976 as a Bicentennial event that has continued ever since.

== Geography ==
According to the United States Census Bureau, the city has a total area of 0.57 square miles (1.48 km^{2}), all of it land.

=== Climate ===
According to the Köppen Climate Classification system, Athena has a warm-summer Mediterranean climate, abbreviated "Csa" on climate maps.

== Demographics ==
Historical population
Census	Pop.	Note	%±
1890	495		—
1900	703		42.0%
1910	586		−16.6%
1920	621		6.0%
1930	504		−18.8%
1940	513		1.8%
1950	750		46.2%
1960	950		26.7%
1970	872		−8.2%
1980	965		10.7%
1990	997		3.3%
2000	1,221		22.5%
2010	1,126		−7.8%
2020	1,209		7.4%
U.S. Decennial Census

=== 2020 census ===
As of the 2020 census, Athena had a population of 1,209. The median age was 44.6 years. 20.5% of residents were under the age of 18 and 23.2% of residents were 65 years of age or older. For every 100 females there were 90.4 males, and for every 100 females age 18 and over there were 88.4 males age 18 and over.

0% of residents lived in urban areas, while 100.0% lived in rural areas.

There were 518 households in Athena, of which 29.7% had children under the age of 18 living in them. Of all households, 50.2% were married-couple households, 15.3% were households with a male householder and no spouse or partner present, and 29.3% were households with a female householder and no spouse or partner present. About 30.8% of all households were made up of individuals and 14.9% had someone living alone who was 65 years of age or older.

There were 548 housing units, of which 5.5% were vacant. Among occupied housing units, 72.8% were owner-occupied and 27.2% were renter-occupied. The homeowner vacancy rate was 2.1% and the rental vacancy rate was 3.4%.

Racial composition as of the 2020 census
Race	Number	Percent
White	1,033	85.4%
Black or African American	1	0.1%
American Indian and Alaska Native	37	3.1%
Asian	6	0.5%
Native Hawaiian and Other Pacific Islander	0	0%
Some other race	34	2.8%
Two or more races	98	8.1%
Hispanic or Latino (of any race)	66	5.5%

=== 2010 census ===
As of the census of 2010, there were 1,126 people, 446 households, and 325 families residing in the city. The population density was 1,975.4 inhabitants per square mile (762.7/km^{2}). There were 484 housing units at an average density of 849.1 per square mile (327.8/km^{2}). The racial makeup of the city was 91.4% White, 0.4% African American, 3.0% Native American, 0.4% Asian, 2.8% from other races, and 2.0% from two or more races. Hispanic or Latino of any race were 4.5% of the population.

There were 446 households, of which 33.6% had children under the age of 18 living with them, 56.1% were married couples living together, 12.1% had a female householder with no husband present, 4.7% had a male householder with no wife present, and 27.1% were non-families. 23.3% of all households were made up of individuals, and 9.4% had someone living alone who was 65 years of age or older. The average household size was 2.52 and the average family size was 2.91.

The median age in the city was 41.6 years. 25% of residents were under the age of 18; 7.3% were between the ages of 18 and 24; 22.2% were from 25 to 44; 29.2% were from 45 to 64; and 16.3% were 65 years of age or older. The gender makeup of the city was 48.0% male and 52.0% female.

=== 2000 census ===
As of the census of 2000, there were 1,221 people, 446 households, and 341 families residing in the city. The population density was 2,152.5 inhabitants per square mile (831.1/km^{2}). There were 473 housing units at an average density of 833.8 per square mile (321.9/km^{2}). The racial makeup of the city was 90.17% White, 3.69% Native American, 0.16% Asian, 0.08% Pacific Islander, 3.60% from other races, and 2.29% from two or more races. Hispanic or Latino of any race were 5.16% of the population.

There were 446 households, out of which 40.6% had children under the age of 18 living with them, 61.4% were married couples living together, 10.8% had a female householder with no husband present, and 23.5% were non-families. 20.0% of all households were made up of individuals, and 11.0% had someone living alone who was 65 years of age or older. The average household size was 2.74 and the average family size was 3.15.

In the city, the population was spread out, with 31.5% under the age of 18, 5.4% from 18 to 24, 27.3% from 25 to 44, 23.1% from 45 to 64, and 12.7% who were 65 years of age or older. The median age was 35 years. For every 100 females, there were 95.7 males. For every 100 females age 18 and over, there were 92.2 males.

The median income for a household in the city was $36,875, and the median income for a family was $40,234. Males had a median income of $30,323 versus $20,598 for females. The per capita income for the city was $15,566. About 10.5% of families and 12.0% of the population were below the poverty line, including 15.3% of those under age 18 and 9.3% of those age 65 or over.

== Education ==
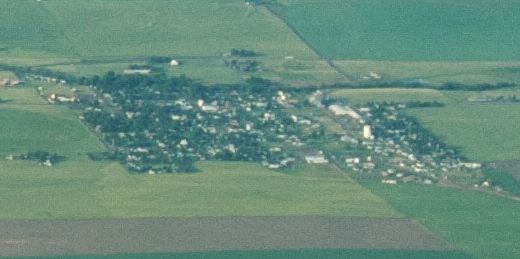
Aerial view of Athena

Athena is served by the Athena Weston School District.

== Industry ==
Hodaka motorcycles were once designed in Athena under the aegis of the Pacific Basin Trading Company, with manufacture in Japan. The Hodaka marque is recognized as an American vintage cycle; it was the vintage marque at the 2006 American Motorcyclist Association (AMA) Vintage Motorcycle Days at Mid-Ohio. Reunions of former PABATCO employees, vintage enthusiasts, and present-day Hodaka owners and riders are held in Athena annually, including swap meet, bike show, scrambles, and observed trials.
