= Athena Weston School District =

School district in Oregon, USA

Logo

Athena Weston School District (29RJ) is a three-school district that serves the cities of Athena, Weston, and Adams, and the community of Mission in Umatilla County, Oregon, United States. The district was formed in the 1970s when the Athena and Weston school districts merged.

== Demographics ==
In the 2009 school year, the district had 32 students classified as homeless by the Department of Education, or 5.7% of students in the district.

== Schools ==
- Athena Elementary School
- Weston Middle School
- Weston-McEwen High School

== See also ==
- List of school districts in Oregon
