= Oregon Trail Arboretum =

Arboretum in Echo, Oregon, U.S.

- Interactive map of Oregon Trail Arboretum
- Type: Arboretum
- Location: Echo, Oregon, United States
- Coordinates: 45.740833°N 119.186667°W
- Opened: 1993
- Status: Open to the public
- Plants: 130

The Oregon Trail Arboretum is an arboretum east of the Echo School Athletic Field in Echo, Oregon. It was established in 1993, and now contains over 130 ornamental trees and shrubs.

== See also ==
- List of botanical gardens in the United States
