= James H. and Cynthia Koontz House =

Historic house in Oregon, United States

- U.S. National Register of Historic Places
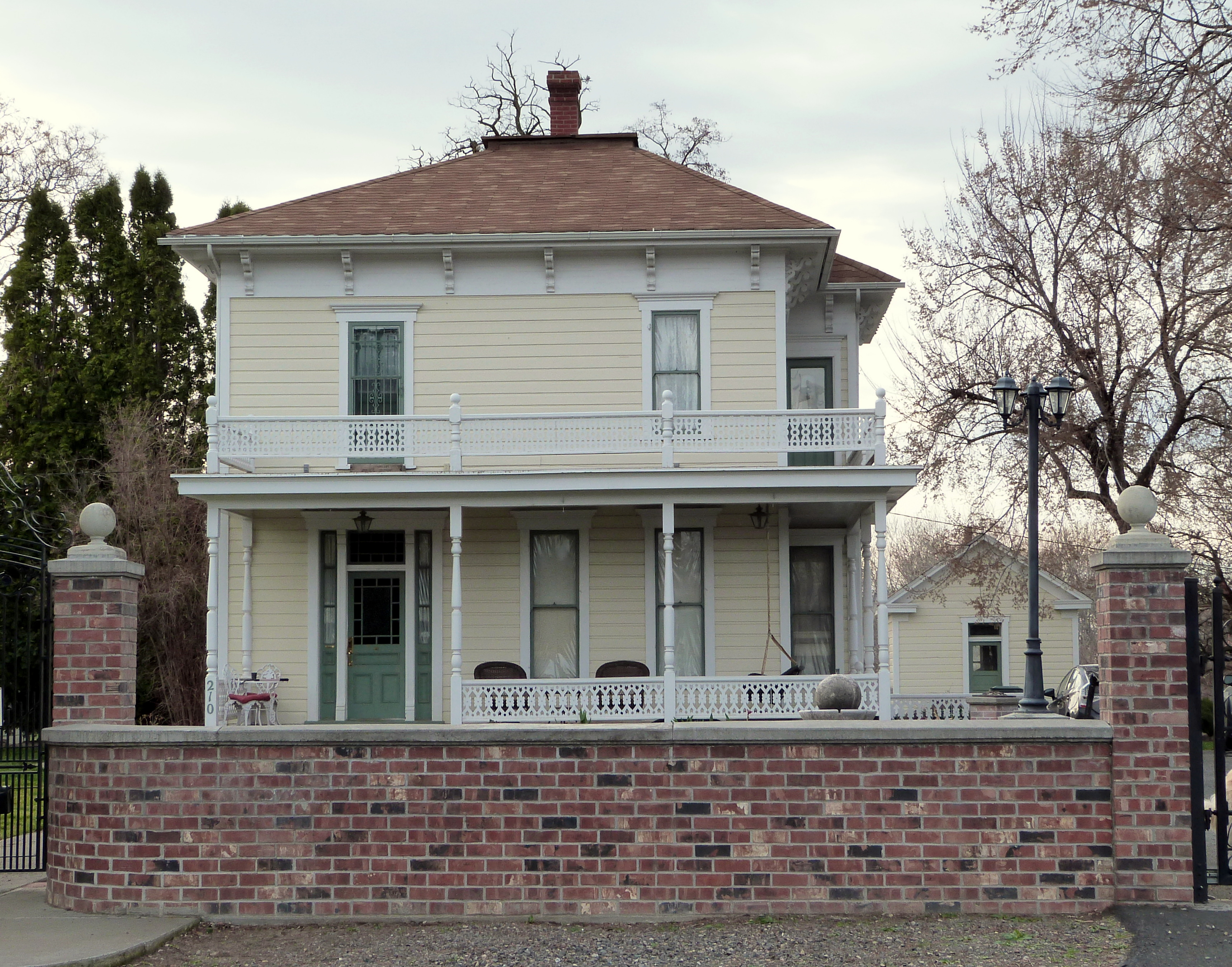
- The Koontz House in 2013

- Location within Oregon Location within the United States
- Location: 210 N. Dupont Street; Echo, Oregon
- Coordinates: 45°44′41″N 119°11′44″W
- Area: 1.93 acres (0.78 ha)
- Built: 1881
- Architectural style: Italianate
- MPS: Echo and The Meadows MPS
- NRHP reference No.: 97000903
- Added to NRHP: August 28, 1997

The James H. and Cynthia Koontz House, also known as Koontz House, is an Italianate house in Echo, Oregon that was built in 1881. It was listed on the National Register of Historic Places in 1997.

It was a home of the Koontz family, a founding family of Echo.
