= Bank of Echo Building =

- U.S. National Register of Historic Places
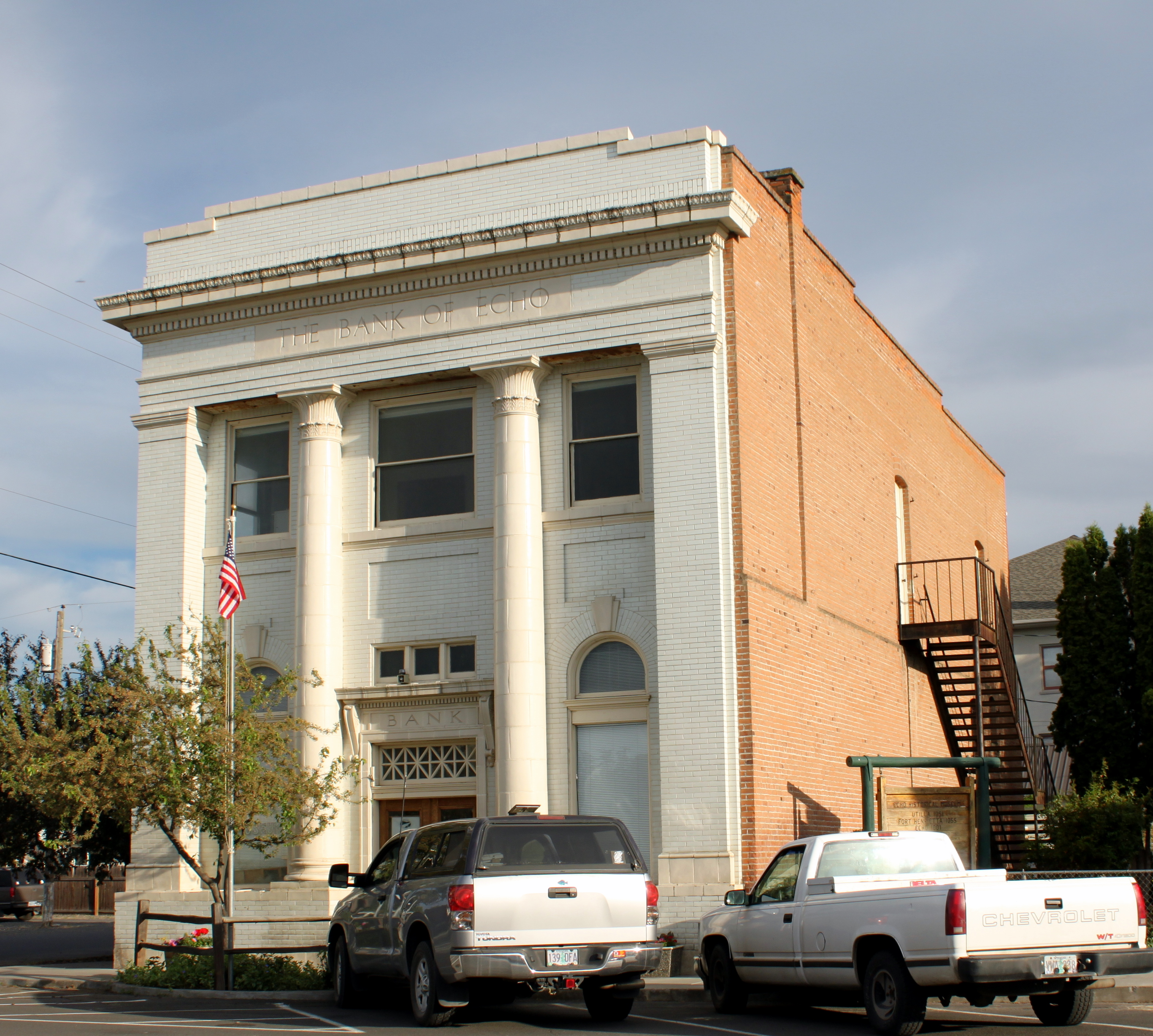
- The Bank of Echo Building in 2009.

- Location within Oregon Location within the United States
- Location: 230 W. Main St. Echo, Oregon
- Coordinates: 45°44′33″N 119°11′39″W
- Area: less than one acre
- Built: 1920
- Architect: Raymond W. Hatch, Parker & Banfield
- Architectural style: Beaux Arts, Roman Classical
- NRHP reference No.: 82003747
- Added to NRHP: April 15, 1982

Bank of Echo Building is located in Echo, Oregon. It was built in 1920 and added to the National Register of Historic Places on April 15, 1982.

== Bank history ==
Articles of incorporation for the Bank of Echo were filed with the Oregon Secretary of State in the week ending April 3, 1905. J.H. Koontz, W.J. Furnish, and R.B. Stanfield were named as incorporators. The capital stock was stated to be $25,000.

== Present building use ==
The building now houses the Echo Historical Museum, a museum of local history.
