= Greasewood Finnish Apostolic Lutheran Church =

Historic church in Oregon, United States

- U.S. National Register of Historic Places
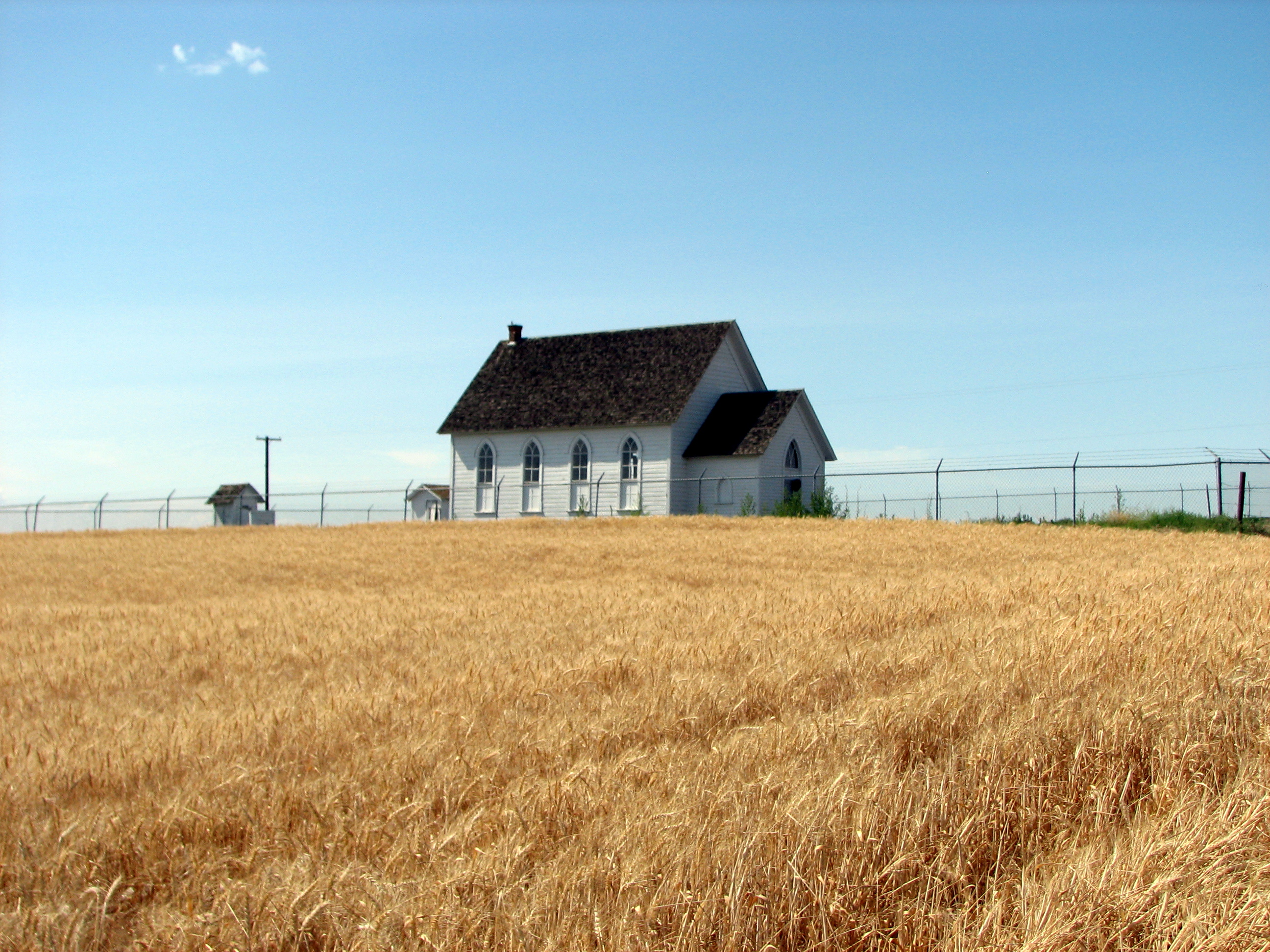

- Location within Oregon Location within the United States
- Nearest city: Adams, Oregon
- Coordinates: 45°46′32″N 118°39′47″W
- Area: less than one acre
- Built: 1884
- Architectural style: Gothic
- NRHP reference No.: 88001041
- Added to NRHP: July 14, 1988

Greasewood Finnish Apostolic Lutheran Church is a historic pioneer church located 5 miles (8 kilometers) west of Adams, Oregon, United States. Volunteers built it on donated land in 1884 to serve the immigrant Finnish Laestadian community. Services were held in Finnish for the immigrants and their children, whose mother tongue was Finnish. After breakups within the Laestadian community, the church affiliated with the Apostolic Lutheran Church of America. Due to the remote location, preachers from surrounding areas, the Midwest, and even as far away as Finland, were brought in to speak.

As noted in an article published in the East Oregonian, "The ministers who served the congregation are remembered for preaching the [A]postolic [Lutheran] faith which stressed confession, repentance and forgiveness."

The church was added to the National Register in 1988.
