= Adams Odd Fellows Hall =

- U.S. National Register of Historic Places
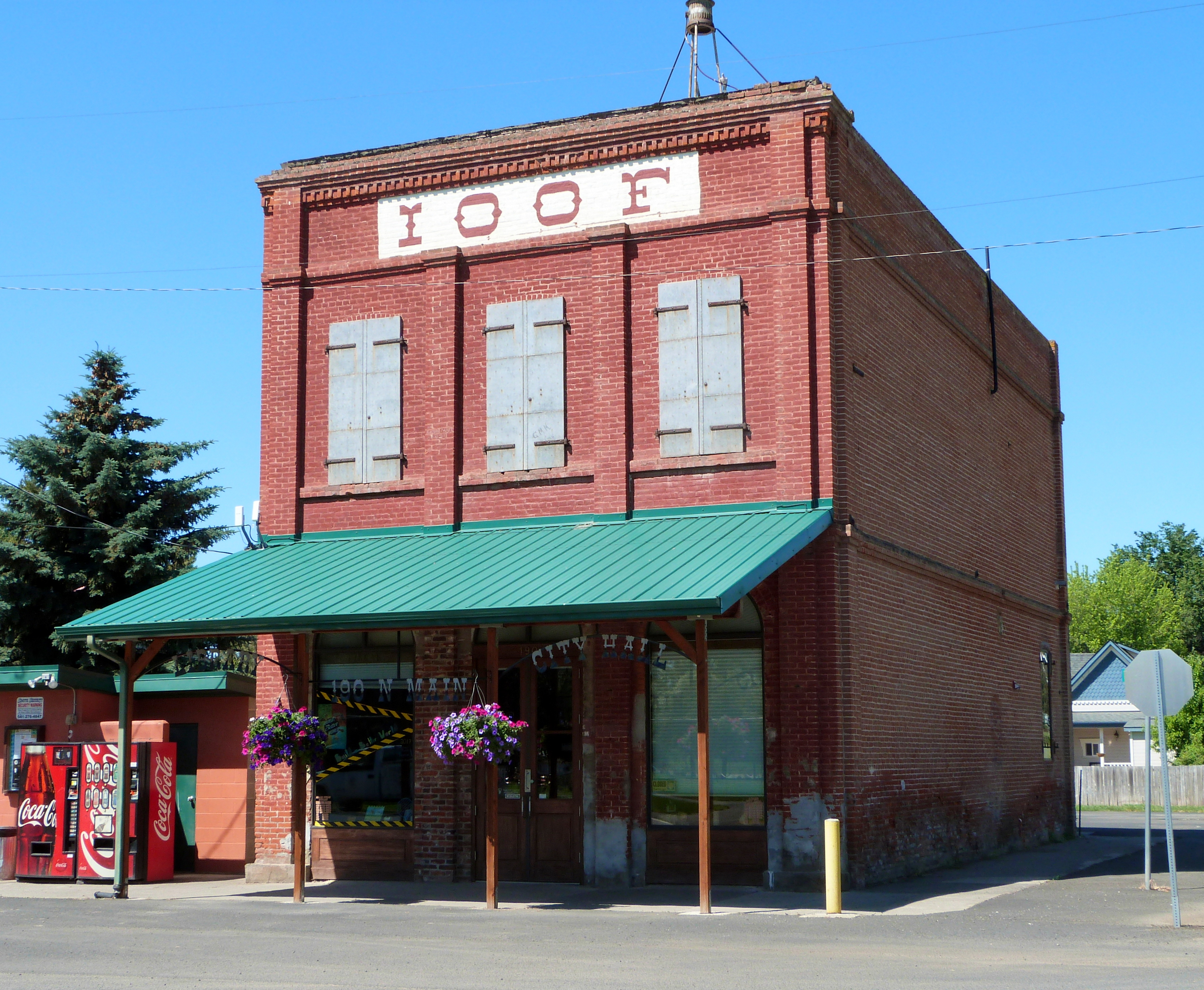
- The Adams Odd Fellows Hall in 2017

- Location within Oregon Location within the United States
- Location: 190 Main Street; Adams, Oregon
- Coordinates: 45.767467°N 118.563328°W
- Area: 0.2 acres (0.081 ha)
- Built: 1886
- Architectural style: Italianate
- NRHP reference No.: 94000810
- Added to NRHP: August 05, 1994

Adams Odd Fellows Hall is a historic building located in the city of Adams, Oregon, in Umatilla County. The structure was built in 1886 and was added to the National Register of Historic Places on August 5, 1994. The building is two stories high and was made in the Italianate architectural style. It is among the oldest fraternal lodge buildings or permanent construction in the county.

== Usage ==
The lower floor of the hall has been used for many commercial purposes. These include a barber shop, billiards parlor, grocery store, and soda fountain. The second story was historically used by the Independent Order of Odd Fellows for their meetings. This space has remained mostly unchanged. It retains many of its original features including a ceremonial dais and historic wall coverings.

== History ==
In 1962, the City of Adams purchased the building and subsequently converted it into a fire engine house and then the Adams city hall. Despite these many changes, the structure retains all of its original key architectural elements, including tall segmental-arched windows, a corbeled cornice, and original iron-clad shutters.
