= Vintage Motorcycle Days =

The Vintage Motorcycle Days is a motorcycle event and rally held annually in Lexington, Ohio that covers more than 300 acres.

== History ==
The event has a long and rich history, as one of motorcycling’s most fun and feel-good-events. Activities include the AMA Vintage Grand Championship, which features Road racing, motocross, Hare scramble, and Dirt track racing. In addition there is a motorcycle swap meet with memorabilia and bikes from all eras. Annual bike exhibits include, the American Motor Drome Wall of Death, product demos, and motorcycle experts. All the proceeds benefit the AMA Motorcycle Hall of Fame. Sponsors of this event have included BikeBandit, Indian Motorcycles, Federal Motorcycle Transport, Smarter Fuel Future, Moto Armory and Sam’s Club.
