= Umatilla, Oregon =

- City
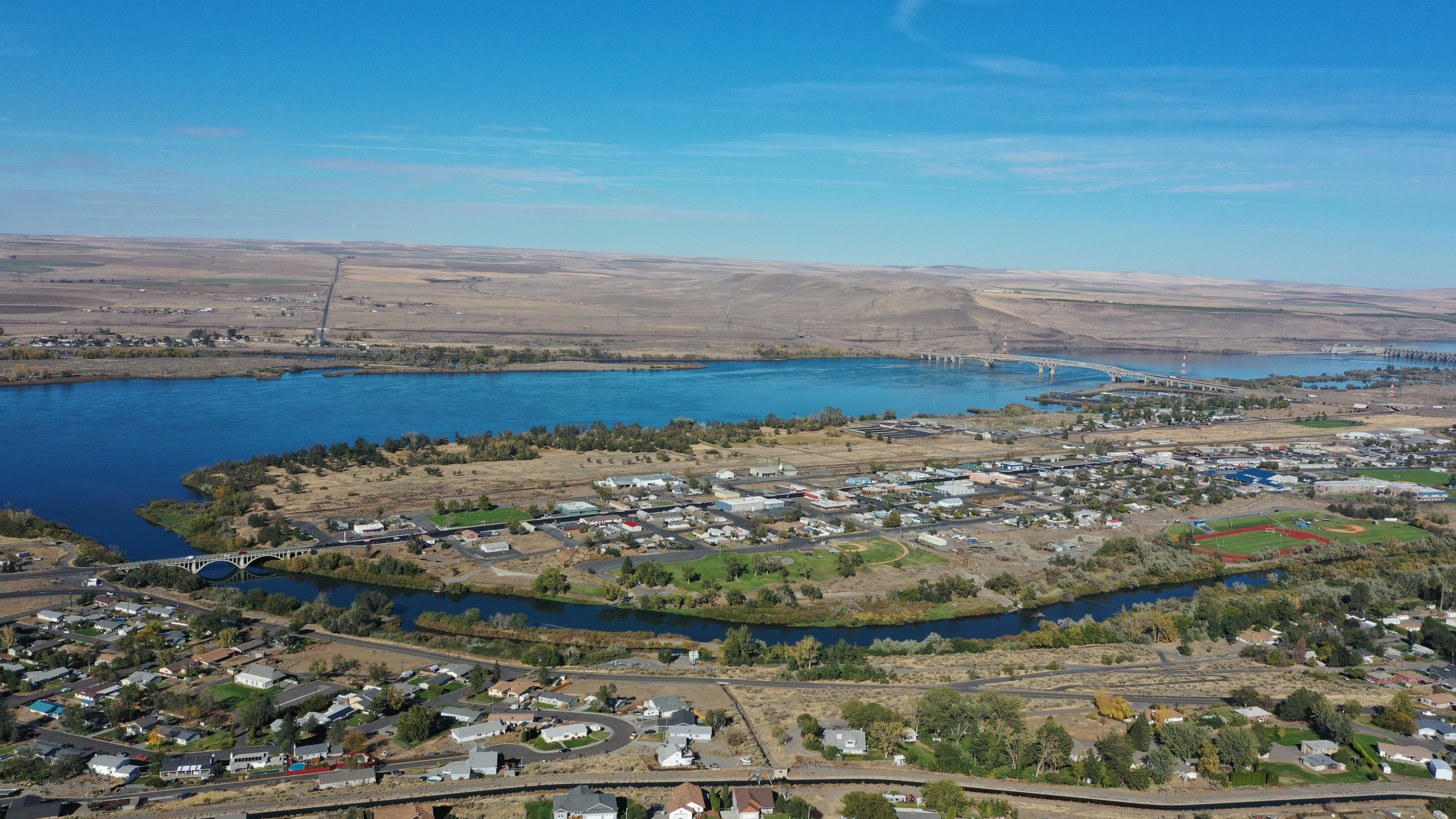
- Umatilla Marina, Umatilla Bridge, and McNary Dam
- Motto: Catch the vision
- Location in Oregon
- Coordinates: 45°55′20″N 119°15′37″W
- Country: United States
- State: Oregon
- County: Umatilla
- Incorporated: 1864

Area
  - Total: 5.08 sq mi (13.16 km^{2})
  - Land: 4.99 sq mi (12.92 km^{2})
  - Water: 0.097 sq mi (0.25 km^{2})
- Elevation: 512 ft (156 m)

Population (2020)
  - Total: 7,363
  - Density: 1,477/sq mi (570.1/km^{2})
- Time zone: UTC-8 (Pacific)
  - Summer (DST): UTC-7 (Pacific)
- ZIP code: 97882
- Area code: 541
- FIPS code: 41-75650
- GNIS feature ID: 2412127
- Website: www.umatilla.gov

Umatilla (/ˌjuməˈtɪlə/, YOO-mə-TIL-ə) is a city in Umatilla County, Oregon, United States. As of the 2020 census, Umatilla had a population of 7,363. The city's population includes approximately 2,000 inmates incarcerated at Two Rivers Correctional Institution.

Umatilla is part of the Pendleton-Hermiston micropolitan area, but has the highest poverty rate (24%) and lowest Median Household Income ($38,796) of all communities in the area, trailing neighboring Hermiston in household income by nearly 23%.

The city is on the south side of the Columbia River along U.S. Route 730 and I-82. The Umatilla Chemical Depot, is 6 miles (10 km) southwest of the city, northwest of the intersection of I-84 and I-82.

== History ==
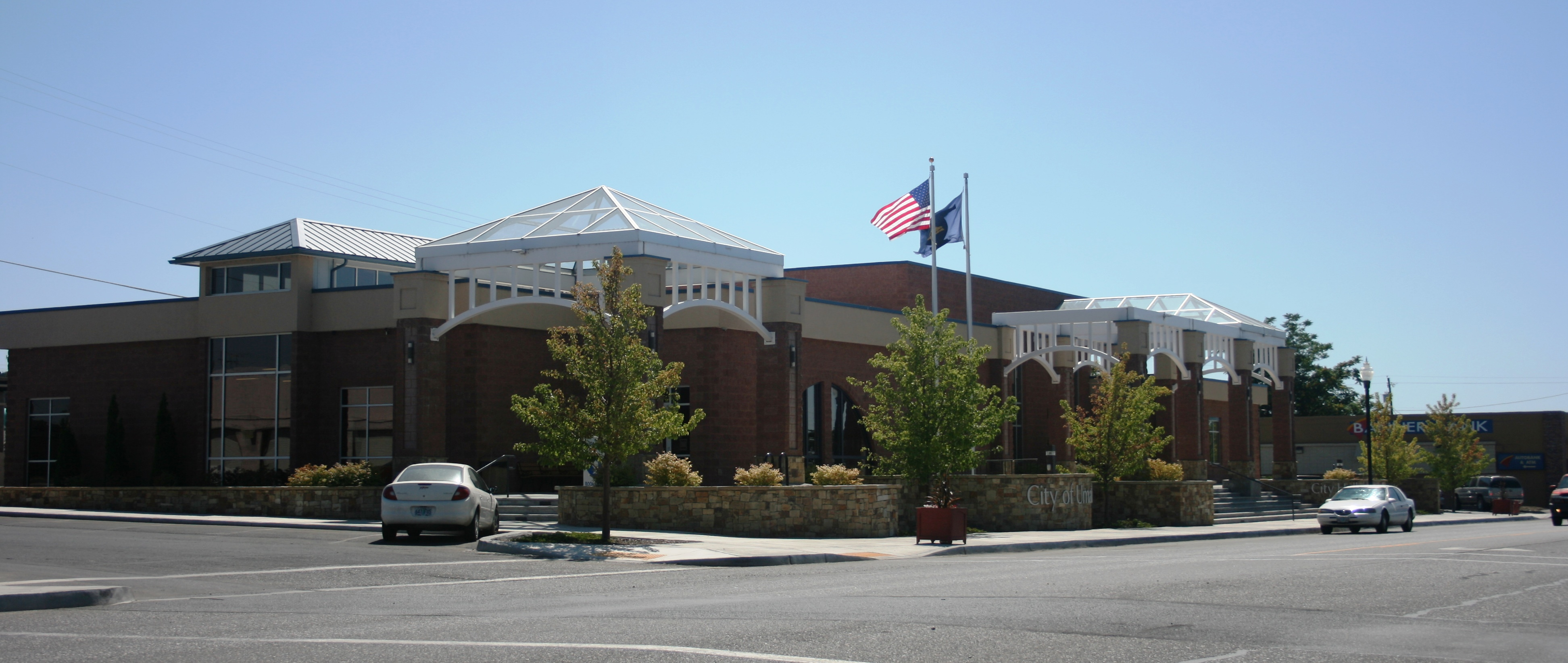
City hall in Umatilla

Before European settlement, the peninsula formed by the convergence of the Umatilla and Columbia rivers had been occupied by the indigenous Umatilla people for at least 10,000 years, being the site of temporary and seasonal villages, fishing and later horse breeding. On their return trip from the mouth of the Columbia River in 1806, the Lewis and Clark Expedition made note in their journals of a village on the site.

The first Umatilla post office was established in September 1851 at the Umatilla Indian Agency about 5 miles (8 km) east of Pendleton, but was discontinued in January 1852. The Umatilla Indian Reservation was created in 1855 after the Walla Walla Council treaty and many of the Umatilla, Cayuse and Walla Walla tribes relocated there, with the vast majority of their lands being given over to the US government. Not long after, when gold was discovered in the Boise Basin of Idaho and in Montana in 1862, the Columbia River became an important passageway inland to the gold fields. That same year Timothy K. Davenport surveyed for a townsite at the mouth of the Umatilla River and filed a plat in 1863. The site was chosen for its location just below the Umatilla Rapids, which formed a navigational headwater on the Columbia and prevented boats from traveling further upstream without needing to be portaged or needing their cargo transferred to a new boat above the rapids. The site was first known as Umatilla Landing, then Umatilla City, then Columbia, reverting to Umatilla City once again over the next year or so. Its post office was established in 1863 with Z. F. Moody as postmaster.

Umatilla quickly became an important trade and distribution center not just for gold rush travelers but for the growing population of farmers and ranchers in the surrounding region. A business district developed along Water Street at the river's edge and at the town's peak it had 3 hotels, 22 saloons, 6 mercantiles and 3 grocery stores, among others. It won the county seat of Umatilla County by a small margin on March 6, 1865, but would only remain so until 1868 when it was moved to the burgeoning village of Pendleton. That same year the first newspaper (a tri-weekly) was established. For a brief time during the gold rush in the 1860s, there was competition between Umatilla and Wallula, Washington, to become the "Sacramento of the Upper Columbia" but the gold rush wouldn't last long enough to support either town's growth beyond frontier villages.

Umatilla remained a vital commercial center until the late 1870s, when the removal of the rapids in 1877 allowed boats traveling from The Dalles to continue directly to Wallula and beyond. The following year the Oregon Steam Navigation Company began construction of a narrow gauge railroad that would connect Umatilla to the agricultural inland, passing from Pendleton to Weston. The great flood of 1894 destroyed what was left of the original business district and many surviving buildings were moved away from the river. The Umatilla Masonic Lodge Hall, one of the only surviving buildings from the original townsite, was relocated to Echo, Oregon, 14 miles (23 km) to the southeast, in 1901. By the early 1910s, Umatilla was making a resurgence as an agricultural center and distribution point and a new business district was established along 3rd and 4th streets, facing away from the river and towards the railroad tracks. Once again the town would gain several hotels and even a bank. In 1916 several women launched secret bids for local office, resulting in what has been called the Petticoat Revolution.

The Umatilla Chemical Depot opened in 1941, to prepare for World War II. The depot's mission was to store and maintain a variety of military items, from blankets to ammunition. The depot took on its chemical weapons storage mission in 1962. From 1990 to 1994 the facility reorganized in preparation for eventual closure, shipping all conventional ammunition and supplies to other installations. On October 25, 2011, the last barrel of HD mustard agent was destroyed and there is no longer a risk of chemical accident in Oregon and Washington.

The original townsite of Umatilla was abandoned completely when the United States Corps of Engineers determined that it would likely be inundated by the construction of the John Day Dam. Between 1965 and 1968 the town was completely rebuilt south of the railroad tracks and all of the buildings on the original townsite were bought and demolished. The relocation would turn out to be for naught as the water level at this point in the river was not affected by the dam's reservoir. Umatilla's original street grid can still be seen north of the railroad tracks and is now a nature preserve and protected archaeological site. It is still owned by the Corps of Engineers and is not accessible to the public.

== Geography ==
Umatilla is 30 miles (48 km) northwest of Pendleton.

According to the United States Census Bureau, the city has a total area of 4.63 square miles (11.99 km^{2}), of which 4.42 square miles (11.45 km^{2}) is land and 0.21 square miles (0.54 km^{2}) is water.

=== Climate ===
According to the Köppen Climate Classification system, Umatilla has a semi-arid climate, abbreviated BSk on climate maps.

Climate data for Umatilla
Month	Jan	Feb	Mar	Apr	May	Jun	Jul	Aug	Sep	Oct	Nov	Dec	Year
Record high °F (°C)	67 (19)	78 (26)	86 (30)	97 (36)	104 (40)	110 (43)	117 (47)	114 (46)	103 (39)	89 (32)	80 (27)	71 (22)	117 (47)
Mean daily maximum °F (°C)	40 (4)	47.5 (8.6)	58.7 (14.8)	68.6 (20.3)	76.7 (24.8)	83.9 (28.8)	92.6 (33.7)	90.5 (32.5)	80.7 (27.1)	67 (19)	50.9 (10.5)	42.1 (5.6)	66.6 (19.2)
Mean daily minimum °F (°C)	25.2 (−3.8)	28.9 (−1.7)	33.8 (1.0)	40.2 (4.6)	47 (8)	54 (12)	59.4 (15.2)	57.3 (14.1)	48.9 (9.4)	40.1 (4.5)	32.7 (0.4)	28.4 (−2.0)	41.3 (5.2)
Record low °F (°C)	−23 (−31)	−23 (−31)	10 (−12)	20 (−7)	26 (−3)	32 (0)	36 (2)	37 (3)	25 (−4)	12 (−11)	−6 (−21)	−27 (−33)	−27 (−33)
Average precipitation inches (mm)	1.05 (27)	0.85 (22)	0.68 (17)	0.55 (14)	0.62 (16)	0.56 (14)	0.16 (4.1)	0.25 (6.4)	0.45 (11)	0.69 (18)	1.07 (27)	1.09 (28)	8.01 (203)
Average snowfall inches (cm)	3.9 (9.9)	2.1 (5.3)	0.2 (0.51)	0 (0)	0 (0)	0 (0)	0 (0)	0 (0)	0 (0)	0 (0)	0.8 (2.0)	1.1 (2.8)	8.2 (21)
Average precipitation days (≥ 0.01 inch)	8	7	6	5	4	4	1	2	3	5	7	8	60

== Demographics ==
Historical population
Census	Pop.	Note	%±
1870	150		—
1880	149		−0.7%
1890	118		−20.8%
1900	127		7.6%
1910	198		55.9%
1920	390		97.0%
1930	345		−11.5%
1940	370		7.2%
1950	883		138.6%
1960	617		−30.1%
1970	679		10.0%
1980	3,199		371.1%
1990	3,046		−4.8%
2000	4,978		63.4%
2010	6,906		38.7%
2020	7,363		6.6%

=== 2020 census ===
As of the 2020 census, Umatilla had a population of 7,363. The median age was 33.7 years. 23.9% of residents were under the age of 18 and 9.3% of residents were 65 years of age or older. For every 100 females there were 169.0 males, and for every 100 females age 18 and over there were 196.9 males age 18 and over.

77.8% of residents lived in urban areas, while 22.2% lived in rural areas.

There were 1,793 households in Umatilla, of which 46.0% had children under the age of 18 living in them. Of all households, 46.2% were married-couple households, 19.4% were households with a male householder and no spouse or partner present, and 24.1% were households with a female householder and no spouse or partner present. About 19.7% of all households were made up of individuals and 7.2% had someone living alone who was 65 years of age or older.

There were 1,865 housing units, of which 3.9% were vacant. Among occupied housing units, 54.5% were owner-occupied and 45.5% were renter-occupied. The homeowner vacancy rate was 0.6% and the rental vacancy rate was 2.9%.

Racial composition as of the 2020 census
Race	Number	Percent
White	3,808	51.7%
Black or African American	198	2.7%
American Indian and Alaska Native	181	2.5%
Asian	46	0.6%
Native Hawaiian and Other Pacific Islander	3	<0.1%
Some other race	2,304	31.3%
Two or more races	823	11.2%
Hispanic or Latino (of any race)	3,494	47.5%

=== 2010 census ===
As of the census of 2010, there were 6,906 people, 1,634 households, and 1,215 families residing in the city. The population density was 1,562.4 inhabitants per square mile (603.2/km^{2}). There were 1,766 housing units at an average density of 399.5 per square mile (154.2/km^{2}). The racial makeup of the city was 70.1% White, 2.3% African American, 1.5% Native American, 0.6% Asian, 23.1% from other races, and 2.4% from two or more races. Hispanic or Latino of any race were 43.1% of the population.

There were 1,634 households, of which 50.8% had children under the age of 18 living with them, 51.2% were married couples living together, 14.7% had a female householder with no husband present, 8.5% had a male householder with no wife present, and 25.6% were non-families. 18.5% of all households were made up of individuals, and 6% had someone living alone who was 65 years of age or older. The average household size was 3.15 and the average family size was 3.59.

The median age in the city was 30.7 years. 26.1% of residents were under the age of 18; 11.7% were between the ages of 18 and 24; 35.6% were from 25 to 44; 20.2% were from 45 to 64; and 6.3% were 65 years of age or older. The gender makeup of the city was 63.7% male and 36.3% female.

=== 2000 census ===
As of the census of 2000, there were 4,978 people, 1,364 households, and 1,062 families residing in the city. The population density was 1,415.3 inhabitants per square mile (546.5/km^{2}). There were 1,511 housing units at an average density of 429.6 per square mile (165.9/km^{2}). The racial makeup of the city was 72.10% White, 2.69% African American, 1.35% Native American, 0.38% Asian, 0.06% Pacific Islander, 21.49% from other races, and 1.93% from two or more races. Hispanic or Latino of any race were 32.58% of the population.

There were 1,364 households, out of which 45.7% had children under the age of 18 living with them, 58.2% were married couples living together, 13.0% had a female householder with no husband present, and 22.1% were non-families. 16.9% of all households were made up of individuals, and 5.1% had someone living alone who was 65 years of age or older. The average household size was 3.14 and the average family size was 3.51.

In the city, the population was spread out, with 31.0% under the age of 18, 12.1% from 18 to 24, 34.7% from 25 to 44, 16.5% from 45 to 64, and 5.7% who were 65 years of age or older. The median age was 29 years. For every 100 females, there were 137.8 males. For every 100 females age 18 and over, there were 157.3 males.

The median income for a household in the city was $33,844, and the median income for a family was $32,969. Males had a median income of $28,500 versus $20,337 for females. The per capita income for the city was $11,469. About 15.6% of families and 19.4% of the population were below the poverty line, including 24.2% of those under age 18 and 21.1% of those age 65 or over.

== Economy ==
The city has seen some industrial investment in recent years through Amazon Web Service's data centers; however, wages have stagnated. The 2017 median household income in Umatilla of $38,796 represented a decline of 7.3% from 2010, and has fallen well behind nearby Hermiston at $50,694. The local economy is heavily reliant on agriculture and supporting services. As of 2001, the five largest employers in Umatilla were the Two Rivers Correctional Institution, JM Manufacturing (polyvinyl chloride pipes), Gilroy Food (dehydrated onions), Boise Cascade (wood chips), and Oregon Rustic (pine furniture).

== See also ==
- Ordnance, Oregon
- Umatilla, Florida
