= Adams, Oregon =

City in Oregon, U.S.

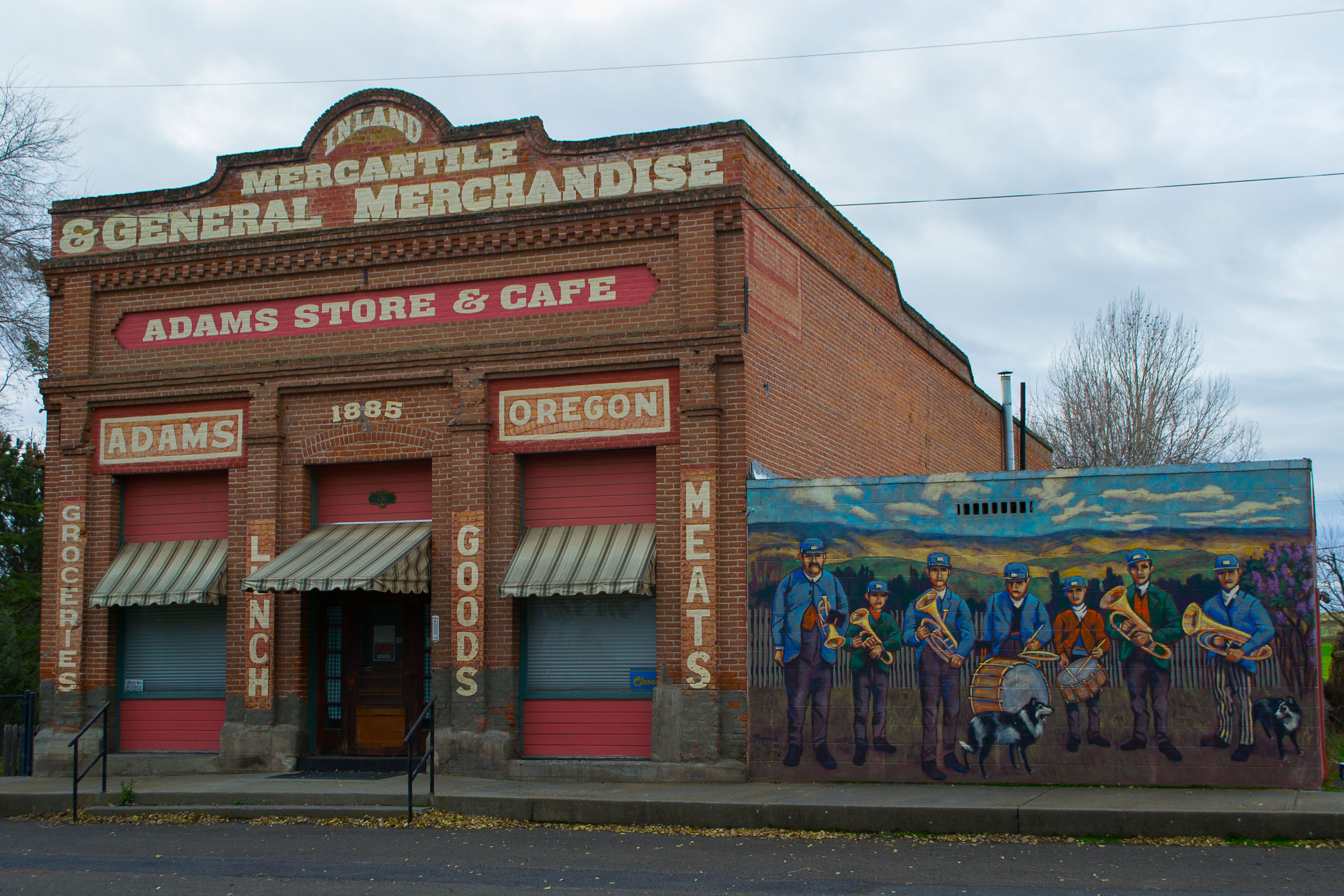
- Inland Mercantile and General Merchandise (2012)

- Location within Umatilla County and Oregon
- Coordinates: 45°45′59″N 118°33′51″W
- Country: United States
- State: Oregon
- County: Umatilla
- Incorporated: 1893

Area
  - Total: 0.36 sq mi (0.92 km^{2})
  - Land: 0.36 sq mi (0.92 km^{2})
  - Water: 0 sq mi (0.00 km^{2})
- Elevation: 1,516 ft (462 m)

Population (2020)
  - Total: 389
  - Density: 1,095.1/sq mi (422.82/km^{2})
- Time zone: UTC-8 (Pacific)
  - Summer (DST): UTC-7 (Pacific)
- ZIP code: 97810
- Area codes: 458 and 541
- FIPS code: 41-00350
- GNIS feature ID: 2409662
- Website: www.cityofadamsoregon.com

Adams is a city in Umatilla County, Oregon, United States, located about 13 miles (21 km) northeast of Pendleton on Oregon Route 11. As of the 2020 census, Adams had a population of 389. It is part of the Pendleton–Hermiston Micropolitan Statistical Area.

== History ==
Adams was named for a local homesteader, John F. Adams. Adams post office was established in 1883. The city was incorporated by the Oregon Legislative Assembly on February 10, 1893.

== Geography ==
According to the United States Census Bureau, the city has a total area of 0.36 square miles (0.93 km^{2}), all of it land.

=== Climate ===
According to the Köppen Climate Classification system, Adams has a warm-summer Mediterranean climate, abbreviated "Csa" on climate maps.

== Demographics ==
Historical population
Census	Pop.	Note	%±
1900	268		—
1910	205		−23.5%
1920	198		−3.4%
1930	178		−10.1%
1940	169		−5.1%
1950	154		−8.9%
1960	192		24.7%
1970	219		14.1%
1980	240		9.6%
1990	223		−7.1%
2000	297		33.2%
2010	350		17.8%
2020	389		11.1%
U.S. Decennial Census

=== 2020 census ===
As of the 2020 census, Adams had a population of 389. The median age was 43.5 years. 22.6% of residents were under the age of 18 and 21.9% of residents were 65 years of age or older. For every 100 females there were 112.6 males, and for every 100 females age 18 and over there were 109.0 males age 18 and over.

0% of residents lived in urban areas, while 100.0% lived in rural areas.

There were 158 households in Adams, of which 36.7% had children under the age of 18 living in them. Of all households, 51.3% were married-couple households, 20.3% were households with a male householder and no spouse or partner present, and 22.8% were households with a female householder and no spouse or partner present. About 23.5% of all households were made up of individuals and 12.1% had someone living alone who was 65 years of age or older.

There were 166 housing units, of which 4.8% were vacant. Among occupied housing units, 81.0% were owner-occupied and 19.0% were renter-occupied. The homeowner vacancy rate was <0.1% and the rental vacancy rate was <0.1%.

Racial composition as of the 2020 census
Race	Number	Percent
White	330	84.8%
Black or African American	0	0%
American Indian and Alaska Native	26	6.7%
Asian	2	0.5%
Native Hawaiian and Other Pacific Islander	0	0%
Some other race	4	1.0%
Two or more races	27	6.9%
Hispanic or Latino (of any race)	16	4.1%

=== 2010 census ===
As of the census of 2010, there were 350 people, 133 households, and 92 families living in the city. The population density was 972.2 inhabitants per square mile (375.4/km^{2}). There were 141 housing units at an average density of 391.7 per square mile (151.2/km^{2}). The racial makeup of the city was 91.4% White, 0.3% African American, 2.0% Native American, 2.3% from other races, and 4.0% from two or more races. Hispanic or Latino of any race were 6.9% of the population.

There were 133 households, of which 32.3% had children under the age of 18 living with them, 52.6% were married couples living together, 7.5% had a female householder with no husband present, 9.0% had a male householder with no wife present, and 30.8% were non-families. 26.3% of all households were made up of individuals, and 12.8% had someone living alone who was 65 years of age or older. The average household size was 2.63 and the average family size was 3.12.

The median age in the city was 40.6 years. 24.6% of residents were under the age of 18; 6% were between the ages of 18 and 24; 25.5% were from 25 to 44; 27.7% were from 45 to 64; and 16.3% were 65 years of age or older. The gender makeup of the city was 54.0% male and 46.0% female.

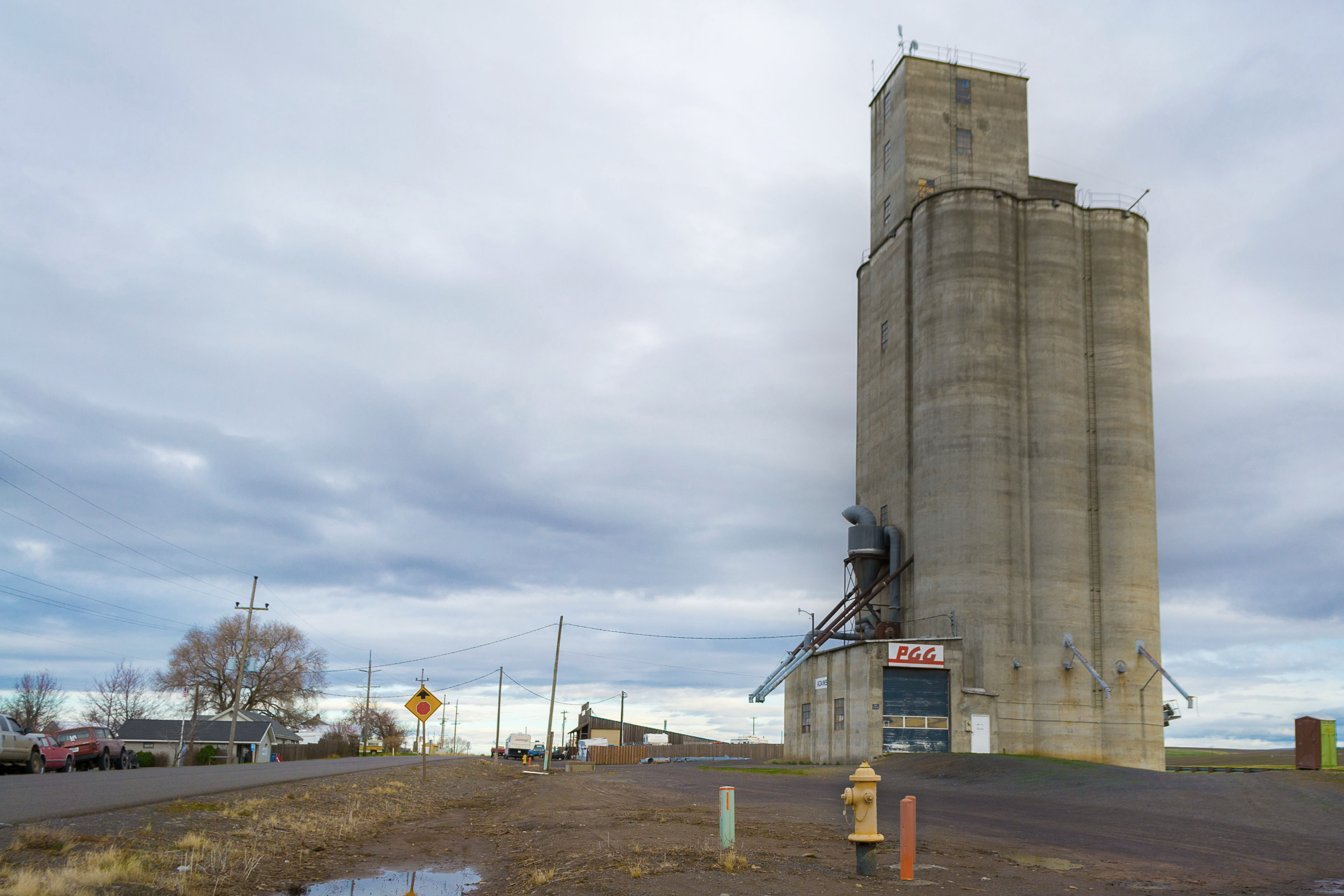
A grain elevator in Adams, Oregon

=== 2000 census ===
As of the census of 2000, there were 297 people, 106 households, and 80 families living in the city. The population density was 863.1 inhabitants per square mile (333.2/km^{2}). There were 118 housing units at an average density of 342.9 per square mile (132.4/km^{2}). The racial makeup of the city was 95.96% White, 2.02% Native American, 0.67% Asian, 0.34% from other races, and 1.01% from two or more races. Hispanic or Latino of any race were 0.34% of the population.

There were 106 households, out of which 31.1% had children under the age of 18 living with them, 65.1% were married couples living together, 7.5% had a female householder with no husband present, and 23.6% were non-families. 22.6% of all households were made up of individuals, and 8.5% had someone living alone who was 65 years of age or older. The average household size was 2.75 and the average family size was 3.16.

In the city, the population was spread out, with 29.0% under the age of 18, 7.7% from 18 to 24, 29.3% from 25 to 44, 22.6% from 45 to 64, and 11.4% who were 65 years of age or older. The median age was 35 years. For every 100 females, there were 102.0 males. For every 100 females age 18 and over, there were 90.1 males.

The median income for a household in the city was $42,500, and the median income for a family was $45,556. Male median income was $33,750, and female median income was $21,538. The per capita income for the city was $14,974. About 4.3% of families and 6.4% of the population were below the poverty line, including 3.1% of those under the age of eighteen and none of those sixty five or over.
