= Echo, Oregon =

- City
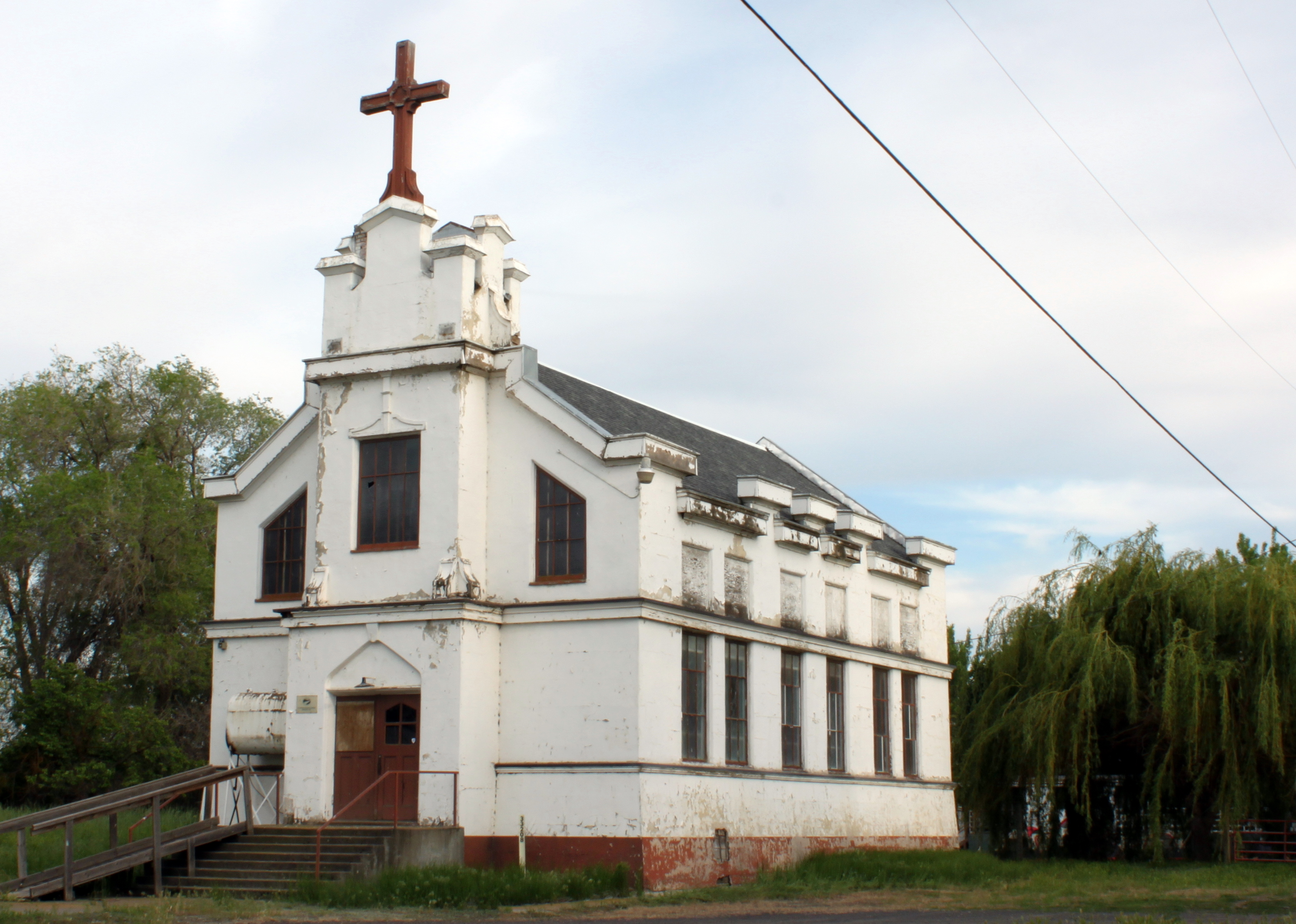
- St. Peter's Catholic Church, dedicated 1913, in Echo

- Location in Oregon
- Coordinates: 45°44′35″N 119°11′31″W
- Country: United States
- State: Oregon
- County: Umatilla
- Incorporated: 1904

Area
  - Total: 0.58 sq mi (1.50 km^{2})
  - Land: 0.58 sq mi (1.50 km^{2})
  - Water: 0 sq mi (0.00 km^{2})
- Elevation: 643 ft (196 m)

Population (2020)
  - Total: 632
  - Density: 1,093/sq mi (422.2/km^{2})
- Time zone: UTC-8 (Pacific)
  - Summer (DST): UTC-7 (Pacific)
- ZIP code: 97826
- Area codes: 458 and 541
- FIPS code: 41-22200
- GNIS feature ID: 2410394
- Website: www.echo-oregon.com

Echo is a city in Umatilla County, Oregon, United States. As of the 2020 census, Echo had a population of 632. It is part of the Pendleton–Hermiston Micropolitan Statistical Area.

== History ==
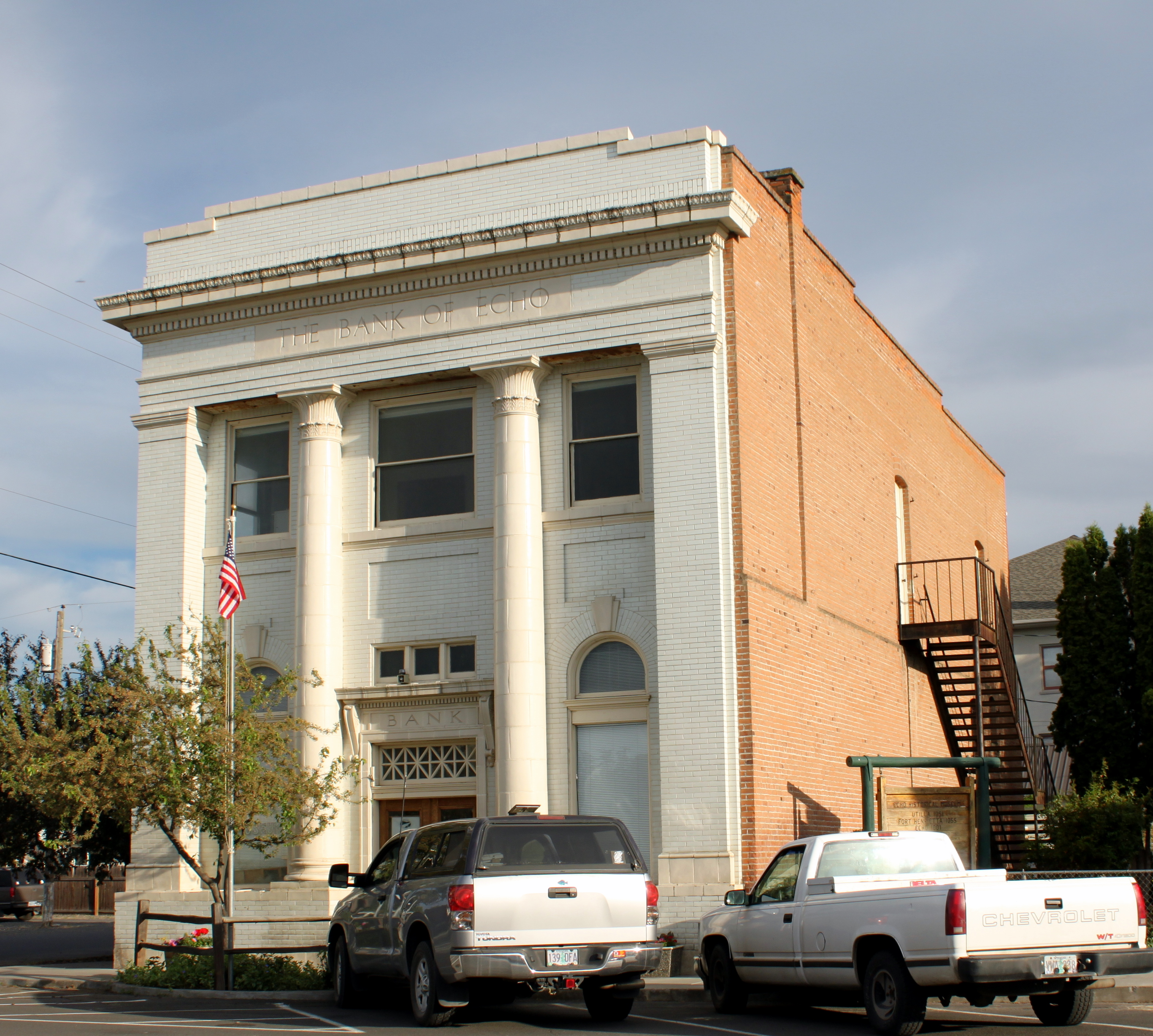
Former Bank of Echo, now the Echo Historical Museum

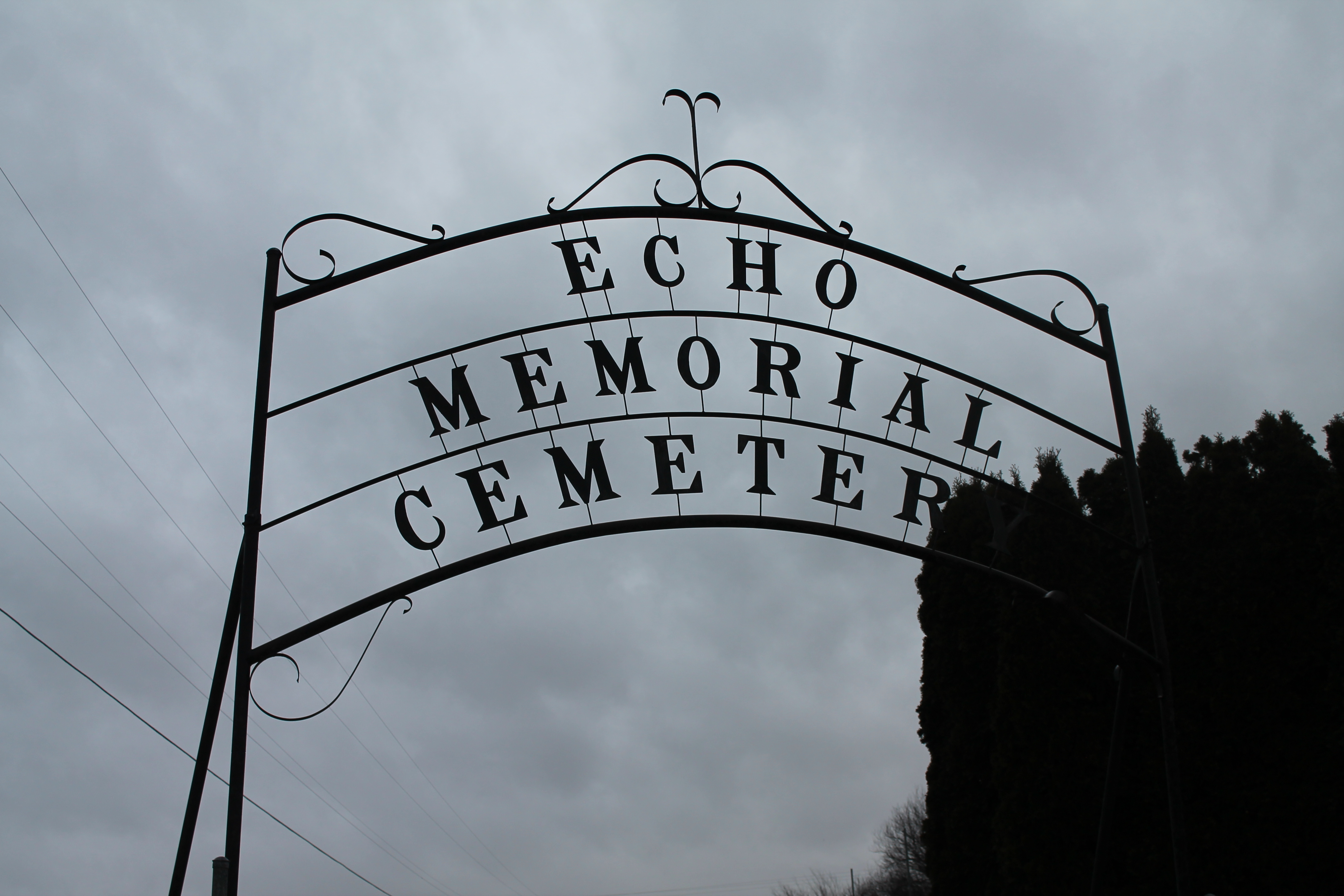
Cemetery in Echo, Oregon

The original Oregon Trail passed just south of Echo. When the Columbia Plateau Route opened in 1847, it passed directly through Echo, crossing the Umatilla River. This eventually became the primary route of the Oregon Trail. Frequently pioneers would stay in Lower Crossing Camp, also located in Echo (the Upper Crossing being at Pendleton). In the 1860s, settlers began moving into the area, and built a ferry crossing the Umatilla River at Echo. The city of Echo is named after Echo Koontz, daughter of Cynthia and J. H. Koontz. Agriculture was the first draw, with alfalfa and corn being the main crops. A town was platted by 1880, and the Oregon Railroad and Navigation Company built a railroad through Echo by 1883, which made the town a shipping point for wool, cattle and sheep during the early 1900s. Echo was incorporated in 1904. On December 22, 1927, William Edward Hickman, the murderer of Marion Parker in Los Angeles on December 17, was arrested by police near the town. The place of Hickman's arrest was commemorated by a billboard.

== Geography ==
Echo is 8 miles (13 km) south of Hermiston and 20 miles (32 km) west of Pendleton in northeastern Oregon. It lies along the Umatilla River about 1 mile (2 km) south of Interstate 84 and U.S. Route 395.

According to the United States Census Bureau, the city has a total area of 0.58 square miles (1.50 km^{2}), all of it land.

=== Climate ===
According to the Köppen Climate Classification system, Echo has a semi-arid climate, abbreviated "BSk" on climate maps.

== Demographics ==
Historical population
Census	Pop.	Note	%±
1910	400		—
1920	501		25.3%
1930	311		−37.9%
1940	280		−10.0%
1950	457		63.2%
1960	456		−0.2%
1970	479		5.0%
1980	624		30.3%
1990	499		−20.0%
2000	650		30.3%
2010	699		7.5%
2020	632		−9.6%
U.S. Decennial Census

=== 2020 census ===
As of the 2020 census, Echo had a population of 632. The median age was 39.4 years. 22.3% of residents were under the age of 18 and 20.9% of residents were 65 years of age or older. For every 100 females there were 96.3 males, and for every 100 females age 18 and over there were 95.6 males age 18 and over.

0% of residents lived in urban areas, while 100.0% lived in rural areas.

There were 253 households in Echo, of which 32.0% had children under the age of 18 living in them. Of all households, 45.1% were married-couple households, 22.1% were households with a male householder and no spouse or partner present, and 21.3% were households with a female householder and no spouse or partner present. About 28.5% of all households were made up of individuals and 10.2% had someone living alone who was 65 years of age or older.

There were 277 housing units, of which 8.7% were vacant. Among occupied housing units, 68.4% were owner-occupied and 31.6% were renter-occupied. The homeowner vacancy rate was 0.6% and the rental vacancy rate was 3.6%.

Racial composition as of the 2020 census
Race	Number	Percent
White	507	80.2%
Black or African American	1	0.2%
American Indian and Alaska Native	5	0.8%
Asian	1	0.2%
Native Hawaiian and Other Pacific Islander	0	0%
Some other race	28	4.4%
Two or more races	90	14.2%
Hispanic or Latino (of any race)	88	13.9%

=== 2010 census ===
As of the census of 2010, there were 699 people, 245 households, and 177 families residing in the city. The population density was 1,205.2 inhabitants per square mile (465.3/km^{2}). There were 256 housing units at an average density of 441.4 per square mile (170.4/km^{2}). The racial makeup of the city was 86.1% White, 1.0% Native American, 0.7% Pacific Islander, 9.6% from other races, and 2.6% from two or more races. Hispanic or Latino of any race were 12.4% of the population.

There were 245 households, of which 40.8% had children under the age of 18 living with them, 48.6% were married couples living together, 17.1% had a female householder with no husband present, 6.5% had a male householder with no wife present, and 27.8% were non-families. 22.4% of all households were made up of individuals, and 9% had someone living alone who was 65 years of age or older. The average household size was 2.85 and the average family size was 3.22.

The median age in the city was 37.5 years. 30% of residents were under the age of 18; 6.4% were between the ages of 18 and 24; 24.1% were from 25 to 44; 26.2% were from 45 to 64; and 13.3% were 65 years of age or older. The gender makeup of the city was 50.5% male and 49.5% female.

=== 2000 census ===
As of the census of 2000, there were 650 people, 240 households, and 168 families residing in the city. The population density was 1,091.3 inhabitants per square mile (421.4/km^{2}). There were 252 housing units at an average density of 423.1 per square mile (163.4/km^{2}). The racial makeup of the city was 89.38% White, 0.15% African American, 0.46% Native American, 0.31% Asian, 6.92% from other races, and 2.77% from two or more races. Hispanic or Latino of any race were 8.15% of the population.

There were 240 households, out of which 36.7% had children under the age of 18 living with them, 51.7% were married couples living together, 12.9% had a female householder with no husband present, and 30.0% were non-families. 22.9% of all households were made up of individuals, and 8.8% had someone living alone who was 65 years of age or older. The average household size was 2.68 and the average family size was 3.18.

In the city, the population was spread out, with 29.1% under the age of 18, 9.5% from 18 to 24, 26.2% from 25 to 44, 22.8% from 45 to 64, and 12.5% who were 65 years of age or older. The median age was 35 years. For every 100 females, there were 99.4 males. For every 100 females age 18 and over, there were 91.3 males.

The median income for a household in the city was $34,464, and the median income for a family was $35,833. Males had a median income of $31,125 versus $20,250 for females. The per capita income for the city was $15,879. About 8.9% of families and 15.4% of the population were below the poverty line, including 24.2% of those under age 18 and 11.8% of those age 65 or over.

== Parks and recreation ==
- Oregon Trail Arboretum
- Fort Henrietta Park
