= Imnaha River =

Tributary of the Snake River in Oregon

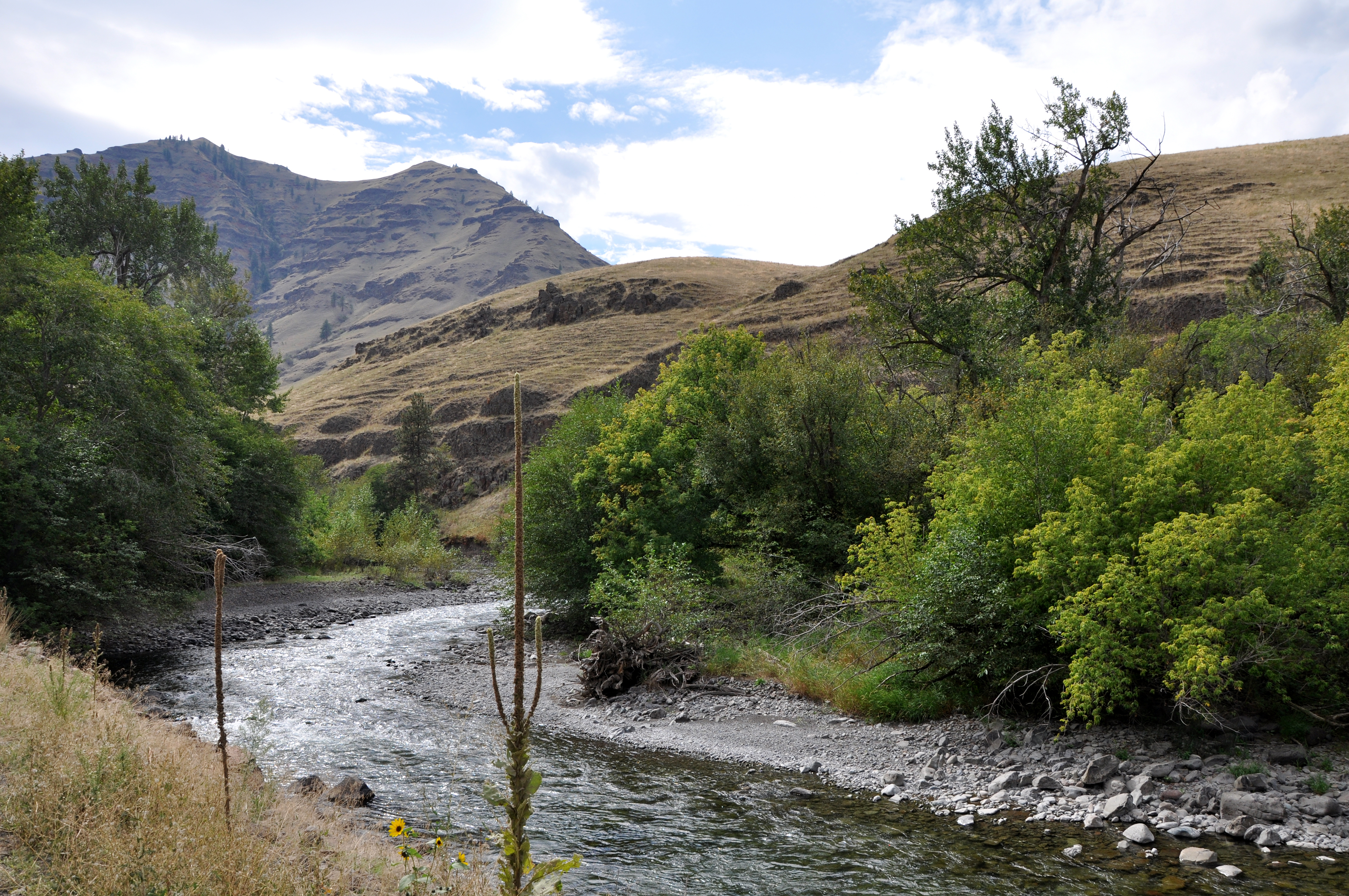
- Imnaha River near Imnaha

- Location of the mouth of the Imnaha River in Oregon
- Etymology: The land ruled over by Imna, a native American leader Alternatively, the name of a Nez Perce village.

Location
- Country: United States
- State: Oregon
- County: Wallowa

Physical characteristics
- Source: Confluence of the North and South forks of the Imnaha River
  - location: Wallowa–Whitman National Forest, Wallowa County, Oregon
  - coordinates: 45°06′47″N 117°07′31″W
  - elevation: 5,324 ft (1,623 m)
- Mouth: Snake River
  - location: Hells Canyon National Recreation Area, Wallowa County, Oregon
  - coordinates: 45°49′03″N 116°45′53″W
  - elevation: 945 ft (288 m)
- Length: 73 mi (117 km)
- Basin size: 855 sq mi (2,210 km^{2})
- Discharge
  - location: Imnaha, 19.3 miles (31.1 km) from the mouth
  - average: 511 cu ft/s (14.5 m^{3}/s)
  - minimum: 16 cu ft/s (0.45 m^{3}/s)
  - maximum: 20,200 cu ft/s (570 m^{3}/s)

National Wild and Scenic River
- Type: Wild, Scenic, Recreational
- Designated: October 28, 1988

The Imnaha River is a 73.3-mile-long (118.0 km) tributary of the Snake River in the U.S. state of Oregon. Flowing generally east near the headwaters and then north through Wallowa County, the entire river is designated Wild and Scenic. It follows a geologic fault to the Snake River, and in addition to land in the Wallowa–Whitman National Forest and private land, its corridor includes parts of three special management areas: the Eagle Cap Wilderness, Hells Canyon National Recreation Area, and Hells Canyon Scenic Byway. The Imnaha flows by the unincorporated community of Imnaha, the only settlement along its course, and enters the Snake River roughly 4 miles (6 km) from the larger river's confluence with the Salmon River of Idaho and 192 miles (309 km) from its confluence with the Columbia River.

== Course ==
Formed by the confluence of its north and south forks, the Imnaha River begins at Cusick Mountain and the western slope of Mount Nebo in the Eagle Cap Wilderness and the Wallowa–Whitman National Forest. It flows east and then north and north-northeast along the Imnaha Divide through Wallowa County, Oregon, for about 64 miles (103 km) to the Snake River on the Oregon-Idaho border. The unincorporated community of Imnaha is the only named settlement through which the river passes. The Imnaha River rises at about 5,300 feet (1,600 m) above sea level and, in a canyon along a geologic fault line, descends about 4,400 feet (1,300 m) between source and mouth. At this point, the North Fork of the Imnaha drainage basin is connected to the West Fork of the Wallowa River by the Polaris Pass drainage divide.

Flowing east from its source, the river receives Deadman Canyon from the right, then passes over Imnaha Falls and receives Rock Creek from the right bank before entering Hells Canyon National Recreation Area at river mile (RM) 60 or river kilometer (RK) 97. About 2 miles (3 km) further downstream, the river leaves the Eagle Cap Wilderness and flows by Indian Crossing and Evergreen campgrounds, both on the left bank, and Hidden Campground on the right. Beginning at Indian Crossing at RM 57 (RK 92), Upper Imnaha Road, also known as National Forest Development Road (NFD) 3960, runs parallel to the river along its left bank. Just below RM 54 (RK 87), Skookum Creek enters from the left, and the river passes Coverdale Campground, which is on the right.

About 2 miles (3 km) later, the river turns toward the north and it continues generally north or slightly east of north for the rest of its course. Beaverdam Creek enters from the left and Dry Creek from the right before the river reaches Ollokot Campground, on the right at about RM 48.5 (RK 78.1). Near the confluence with Dry Creek, the river passes under the Hells Canyon Scenic Byway, also known as the Wallowa Mountain Loop and as NFD 39. At this point, the byway and Upper Imnaha Road become contiguous and run along the river's left bank. Blackhorse Campground is on the left shortly thereafter, and Blackhorse Creek enters from the left. Over the next stretch, the river receives Gumboot Creek, where the scenic byway leaves the river and follows the creek while Upper Imnaha Road, also known as NFD 3955 below this point, continues parallel to the river along its left bank. About 1 1/4 miles below Gumboot Creek is the Imnaha River Acclimation Site and Weir, where adult Chinook salmon are collected and smolts are released for the hatchery supplementation program. Soon Mahogany, Nine Point, and Spring creeks enter from the left, then Crazyman Creek from the right, followed by Henry Creek and Keener Gulch, both from the left, Grizzly Creek from the right, and Leggett Gulch from the left just upstream of RM 41 (RK 66).

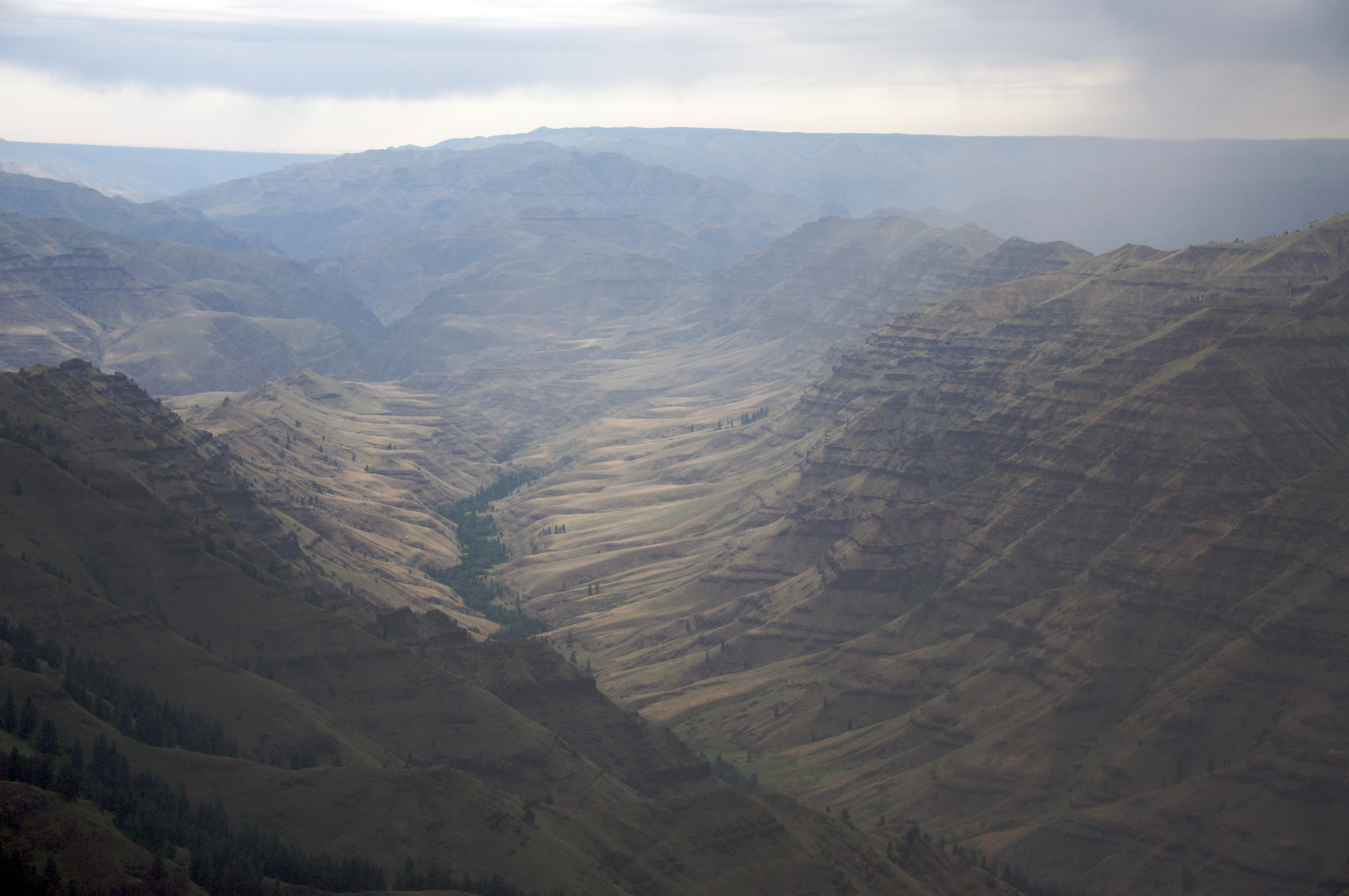
The river as seen in the dry summer months

Further along, Trail Creek enters from the right, and Upper Imnaha Road crosses the river and continues parallel to it along its right bank. Soon Neil Canyon and Johnson Creek, where Upper Imnaha Road crosses to the left bank, enter from the right. Below this, Shin Creek enters from the right, then Grouse Creek from the left at Park Cemetery, which is on the left. Thereafter, Musty and Balter creeks enter from the right, and Line Creek from the left about 33 miles (53 km) from the mouth. Downstream, Winston Creek enters from the right and Park Creek from the left, then Beeler Creek from the left before the river flows by Imnaha Grange Hall, on the left. Chalk Creek enters from the left and Campbell Creek from the right shortly thereafter, followed by Dunn Creek from the left and Freezeout Creek from the right. Slightly downstream of the confluence with Freezeout Creek, Upper Imnaha Road crosses the river again and runs along its right bank all the way to the community of Imnaha. Soon Indian and Turner creeks enter from the left and Blackmore and Double creeks from the right before the river passes the College Creek Ranger Station, on the left at about RM 27 (RK 43). Near the station, which is on the National Register of Historic Places, College Creek enters from the right.

Below the historic forest ranger station, Adams, Schleur, Spring, Snell, Loyd, Keeler, Jody, Thorn, Dunlap, Rippleton, Dead Horse, High Camp, and Deer creeks enter from the right before Sheep Creek enters from the left near Imnaha at RM 19.5 (RK 31.4). At Imnaha, the river passes under Oregon Route 350, which links the community to Joseph to the southwest. The bridge that carries the highway is its eastern terminus and is also the western terminus of Hat Point Road, also known as NFD 4240, which drops down to the river from Grizzly Ridge. Downstream of Imnaha, the road running parallel to the river along its right bank is known as Lower Imnaha Road. Slightly below Imnaha, the river passes a United States Geological Survey (USGS) gauge, which is on the left, before receiving Adams Canyon and Bailey Canyon creeks from the right, Weaver Canyon from the left, and then Burcher Canyon from the right. Further downstream, the river receives Bare Creek from the left, and shortly thereafter Lower Imnaha Road crosses to the left bank and becomes Dug Bar Road (NFD 4260). Then Fence, Fall, Log, Kettle, Packsaddle, Buck, Little Basin, and Corral creeks enter from the left, before the river receives Thorn Creek from the left about 6 miles (9.7 km) from the mouth. Below this, Tulley Creek enters from the left and Lightning and Cow creeks from the right. Just upstream of Cow Creek, Dug Bar Road crosses the river to its right bank and continues away from it overland toward the Snake River upstream of its confluence with the Imnaha River, which has no road next to it for its final stretch. Below Cow Creek, Vance Draw enters from the left, Trough Gulch from the right, and Toomey Gulch from the left. The Imnaha River enters the Snake River about 4.0 miles (6.4 km) above the larger river's confluence with the Salmon River of Idaho and 192 miles (309 km) from its confluence with the Columbia River.

== See also ==
- List of rivers of Oregon
- List of longest streams of Oregon
- List of National Wild and Scenic Rivers
