= Hells Canyon Scenic Byway =

Scenic highway in Oregon, United States

Hells Canyon Scenic Byway
- Hells Canyon Scenic Byway highlighted in red

Route information
- Maintained by Oregon Department of Transportation, Oregon Parks and Recreation Department, etc.
- Length: 218.4 mi (351.5 km)
- Existed: April 19, 1992–present

Major junctions
- West end: I-84 / OR 82 near La Grande
- OR 204 in Elgin; OR 3 in Enterprise; OR 350 / OR 351 in Joseph
- East end: I-84 / OR 86 near Baker City

Location
- Country: United States
- State: Oregon
- Counties: Union, Wallowa, Baker

Highway system
- Scenic Byways; National; National Forest; BLM; NPS; Oregon Highways; Interstate; US; State; Named; Scenic

Hells Canyon Scenic Byway is a designated All-American Road in the U.S. state of Oregon. It is located at the northeast corner of Oregon and comprises Oregon Route 82, Oregon Route 350, Forest Roads 39 and 3365, and most of Oregon Route 86. From the west, the byway begins at the intersection of Oregon Route 82 and Interstate 84 near La Grande and ends near Baker City, at the junction of Interstate 84 and Oregon Route 86. It is 218.4 miles (351.5 km) long.

== Route description ==
Along its route, Hells Canyon Scenic Byway hugs the Wallowa River, runs through the Wallowa-Whitman National Forest, and goes near Wallowa Lake, Salt Creek Summit, Hells Canyon Overlook and the Eagle Cap Wilderness Area.

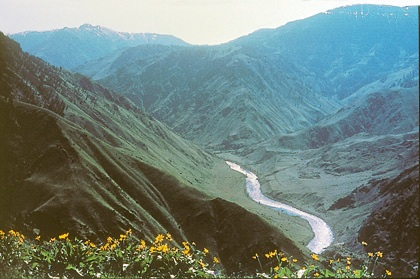
Hells Canyon

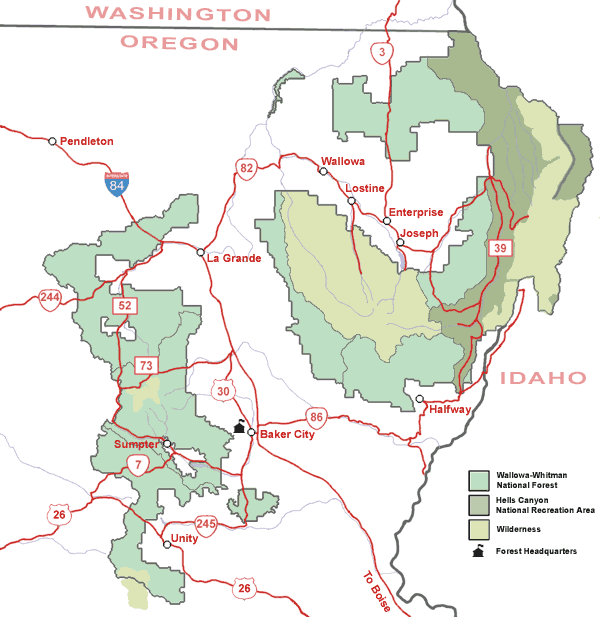
Map of Wallowa-Whitman National Forest, including the Hells Canyon area

== History ==
The Hells Canyon Scenic Byway was designated a National Forest Scenic Byway on April 19, 1992. It was later made an Oregon State Scenic Byway on February 19, 1997. The All-American Road designation was applied to the roadway on June 15, 2000.

== See also ==
- Hells Canyon
- Hells Canyon National Recreation Area
- Hells Canyon Wilderness
