= Minam State Recreation Area =

State park in Oregon, United States

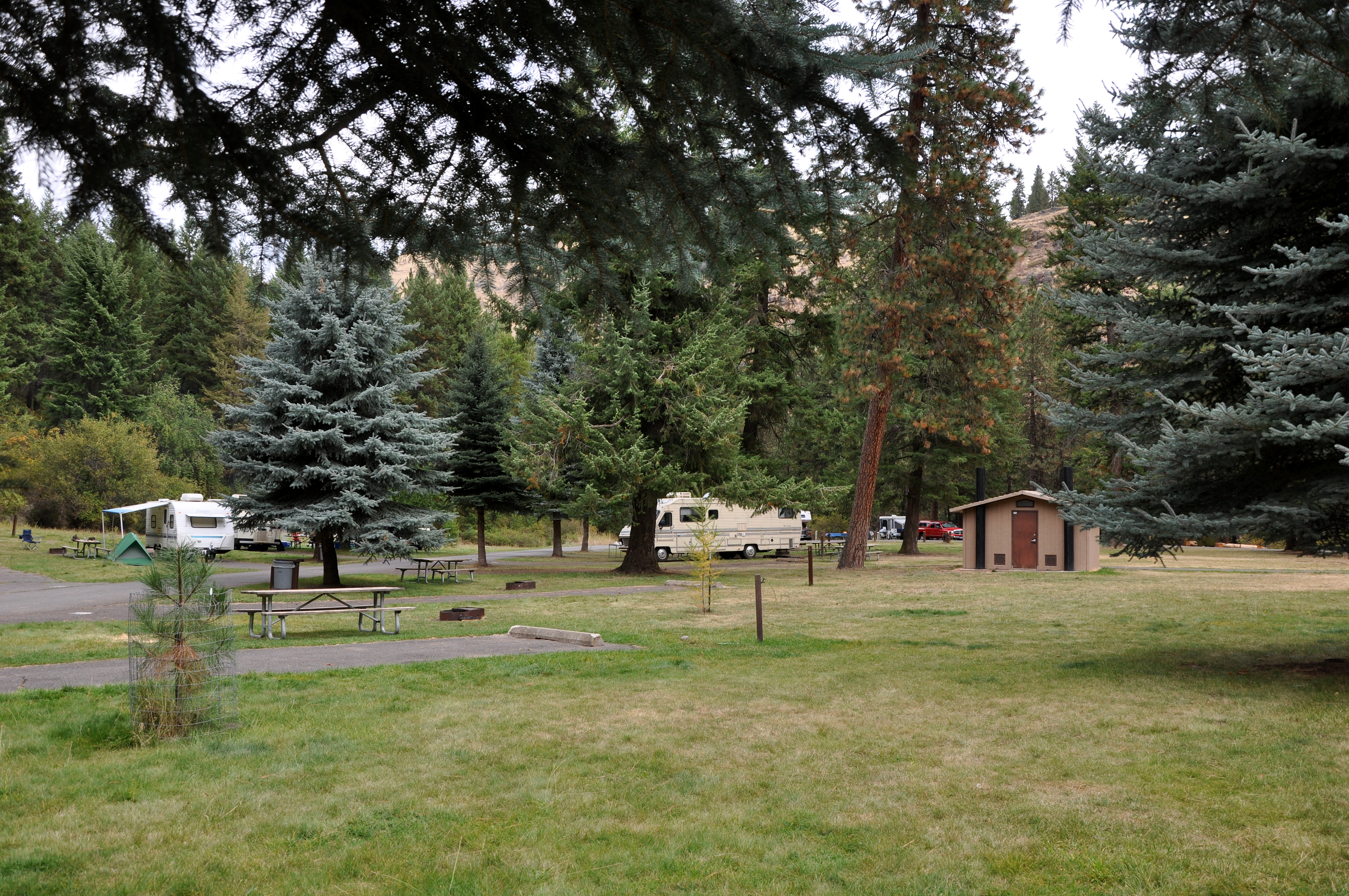
- Camping in September

- Location within Oregon Location within the United States
- Type: Public, state
- Location: Wallowa County, Oregon
- Nearest city: Elgin
- Coordinates: 45°47′00″N 117°43′04″W
- Area: 602 acres (244 ha)
- Operator: Oregon Parks and Recreation Department
- Status: Open year-round

Minam State Recreation Area is a state park in the U.S. state of Oregon. Administered by the Oregon Parks and Recreation Department, it covers about 600 acres (240 ha) along the Wallowa River north of La Grande in Wallowa County. The park is off Oregon Route 82 about 15 miles (24 km) northeast of Elgin.

The park, generally open all year, has 22 primitive campsites, restrooms, a boat ramp, and a walking trail. Visitors may picnic, go boating on the river, or fish for steelhead. Wildlife in the area includes deer, bear, elk, and an occasional cougar or bighorn sheep.

== See also ==
- List of Oregon state parks
