= Wallowa Lake Tramway =

Aerial tramway in Oregon, United States

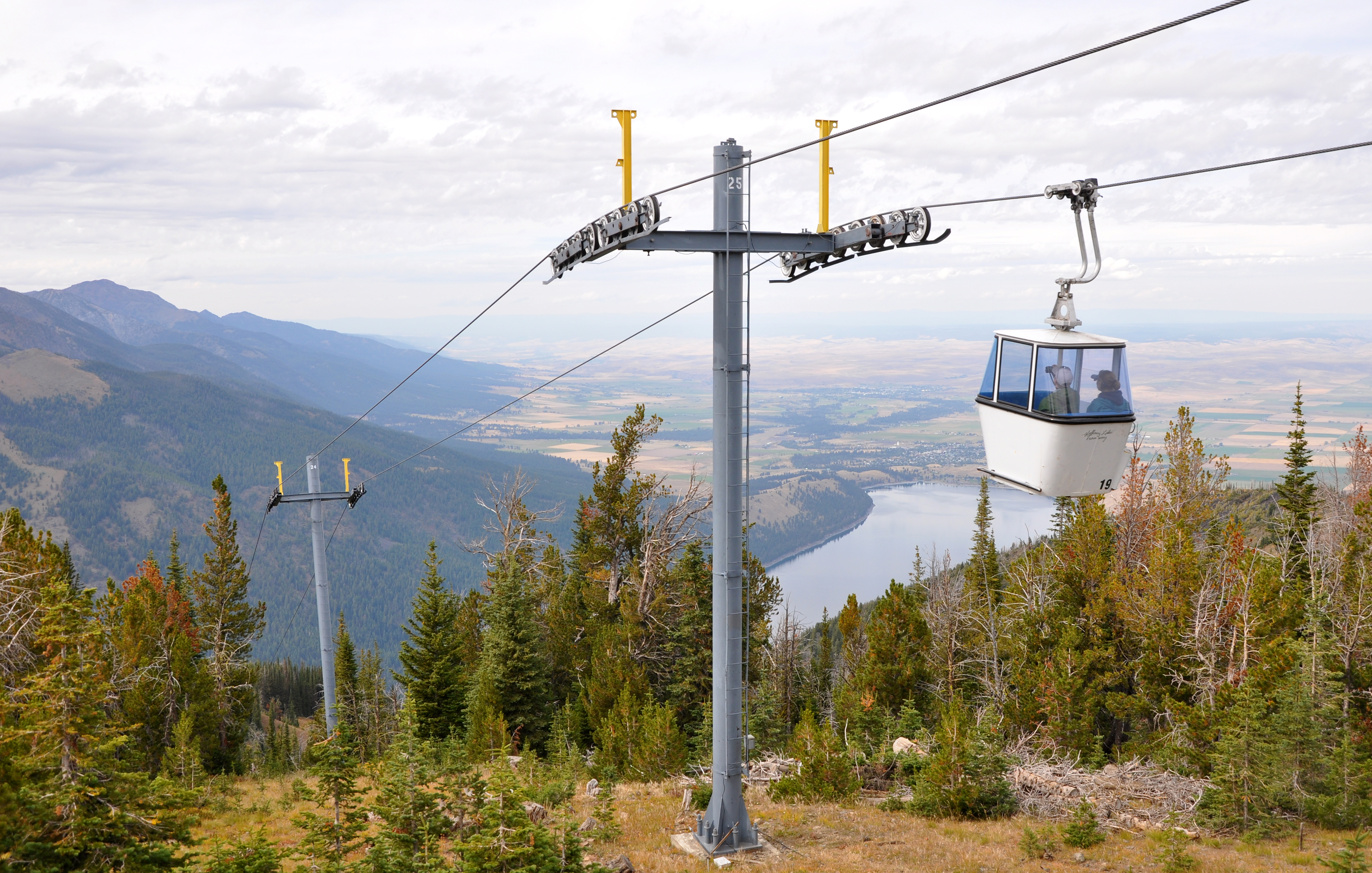
- Tramway from top of Mount Howard with Wallowa Lake in the background
- Interactive map of Wallowa Lake Tramway

Overview
- Status: Operational
- Character: Recreational
- Location: 59919 Wallowa Lake Highway; Joseph, Oregon
- Country: United States
- Coordinates: 45.26355°N 117.1809°W
- Termini: Mount Howard
- Elevation: lowest: 4,450 feet (1,360 m) highest: 8,150 feet (2,480 m)
- No. of stations: 2
- Construction begin: 1968; 58 years ago
- Open: 1970; 56 years ago

Operation
- Carrier capacity: 4
- Operating times: mid-May until early October
- Trip duration: 15 minutes

Technical features
- Aerial lift type: Mono-cable gondola detachable
- Line length: 19,300 feet (5,900 m)
- No. of support towers: 25
- Installed power: 150 h.p.

The Wallowa Lake Tramway is an aerial cable gondola lift near Joseph, Oregon, in the Wallowa-Whitman National Forest of the United States, named for Wallowa Lake. The tram runs from the floor of the Wallowa Valley to the top of Mount Howard. It travels to an elevation of 8,000 feet (2,400 m) above sea level and allows for views of the Eagle Cap Wilderness area and the rest of the Wallowa Mountains.

== History ==
The tramway was built in 1968, and opened for service in 1970. In June 1992, a malfunction caused the evacuation of the lift's passengers who were then flown by helicopter down the mountain, with no injuries reported. This was the first safety incident for the tram. Later that year, the tramway was used to haul fire fighters fighting a forest fire to the top of the mountain. In 1999, tram owners explored expanding the tramway to include a winter resort.

== Operations ==
Twenty-five towers are used along the route to support the cables of tramway. The Wallowa Lake Tramway rises 3,700 feet (1,100 m) vertically, starting at the 4,200-foot (1,300 m) level of the lake. At the top of the gondola ride, an elevation of 8,150 feet (2,480 m), is Oregon's highest restaurant, the Summit Grill. The Tramway runs May through October. It formerly ran on the weekends in winter for skiing and snowshoeing. The four-person gondolas take fifteen minutes to make a one-way trip.

The tram is the steepest four-person gondola in North America, ending at the 8,256-foot (2,516 m) peak of Mount Howard. The tram is operated on 115 acres (0.47 km^{2}) of land leased from the Forest Service through a special national forest permit. At the summit one can view wildlife, and wildflowers in an alpine meadow. Parts of Oregon, Washington, and Idaho are visible from the summit. Two miles (3 km) of hiking trails are available.
