= Oregon Route 351 =

State highway in Wallowa County, Oregon, US

Oregon Route 351
- Route 351 highlighted in red

Route information
- Maintained by ODOT
- Length: 6.94 mi (11.17 km)
- Existed: 2003–present

Major junctions
- North end: OR 82 and OR 350 in Joseph
- South end: Wallowa Lake State Park

Location
- Country: United States
- State: Oregon
- County: Wallowa

Highway system
- Oregon Highways; Interstate; US; State; Named; Scenic
← OR 350	→ OR 361

Oregon Route 351 (OR 351) is an Oregon state highway running from Joseph to Wallowa Lake State Park. OR 351 is known as the Joseph-Wallowa Lake Highway No. 351 (see Oregon highways and routes). It is 6.94 miles (11.17 km) long and runs north–south, entirely within Wallowa County.

OR 351 was established in 2003 as part of Oregon's project to assign route numbers to highways that previously were not assigned, and, as of January 2024, was unsigned.

== Route description ==
OR 351 begins at an intersection with OR 82 and OR 350 in Joseph and heads south past Wallowa Lake through Wallowa Lake State Park, ending 0.04 miles (0.064 km) past the southern boundary of the park.

== History ==
OR 351 was assigned to the Joseph-Wallowa Lake Highway in 2003. This section of highway was originally part of OR 82.

== Major intersections ==
The entire route is in Wallowa County.

Location	mi	km	Destinations	Notes
	6.94	11.17	Wallowa Lake State Park	Southern terminus
Joseph	0.00	0.00	OR 82 west / OR 350 east	Northern terminus
1.000 mi = 1.609 km; 1.000 km = 0.621 mi
