= Polaris Pass =

Mountain pass in Oregon, United States

- Interactive map of Polaris Pass
- Elevation: 8,890 feet (2,710 m)

Third Approach
- Location: Wallowa
- Coordinates: 45°10′26″N 117°13′36″W

Polaris Pass, Polaris Point or also Polaris Peak, is a 8,890-foot (2,710 m) mountain pass in the Wallowa Mountains in Oregon. It is one of the navigable ridges with the highest elevation within the Eagle Cap Wilderness. Polaris Pass is the drainage divide between the watersheds of the North Fork of the Imnaha River to the West Fork of the Wallowa River. It is located between the southern flanks of Pete's Point and the northern skirt of Sentinel Peak and is traversed by Polaris Trail #1831.

== Geology ==
The geology of Polaris Pass is primarily formed of slate of the Hurwal Formation, with areas of Martin Bridge Limestone also present. These are constituted by dark and grey basalts that resemble more the strata in the Columbia River Gorge than to the distinctive slopes of marble and granite in most of the Wallowa–Whitman National Forest. Some of the basalt strata form pinnacles out of its eastern slopes.

== Access ==
Polaris Pass is traversed by a trail that can be reached starting at Indian Crossing trailhead through the North Folk Imnaha River trail. It can also be reached via the East Fork Wallowa River trail starting at the Wallowa River trailhead. From trail 1804 in the East to the junction with trail 1802 in the West, the trail over Polaris Pass is approximately 7 miles (11 km). The Junction with the Wallowa Lake trail 1820 in the West of Polaris Pass is located at 4,650 feet (1,420 m) while the junction in the East with the North Fork Imnaha River trail is at 6,810 feet (2,080 m).
