= College Creek Ranger Station =

- U.S. National Register of Historic Places
- U.S. Historic district
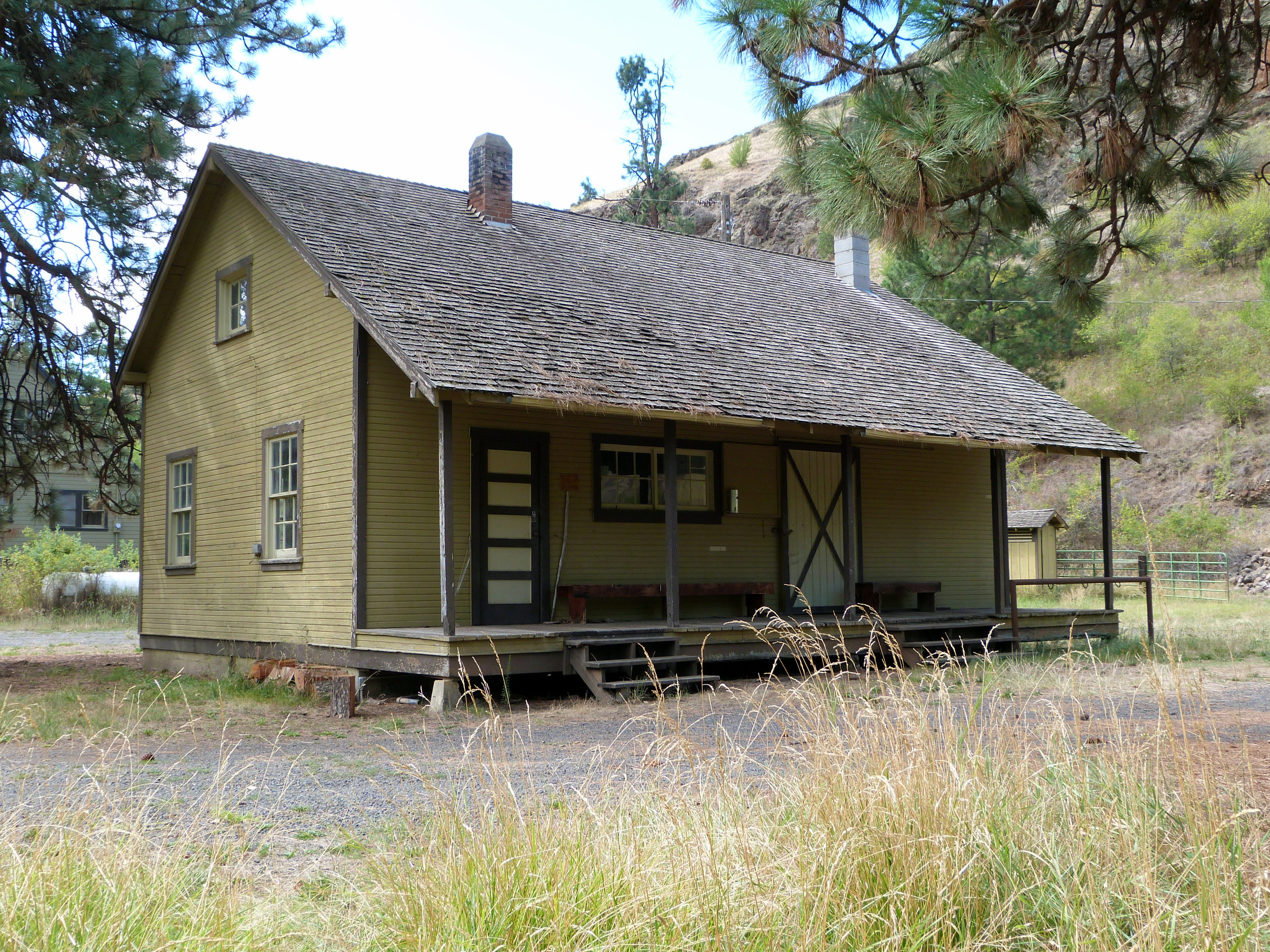
- The office-warehouse building at College Creek Ranger Station in 2013.

- Location within Oregon Location within the United States
- Nearest city: Imnaha, Oregon
- Coordinates: 45°26′02″N 116°47′08″W
- Area: 1.2 acres (0.49 ha)
- Built: 1935
- Built by: Civilian Conservation Corps
- Architect: Architects of the U.S. Forest Service
- Architectural style: Rustic architecture of USDA
- MPS: USDA Forest Service Administrative Buildings in Oregon and Washington Built by the CCC MPS
- NRHP reference No.: 91000171
- Added to NRHP: March 6, 1991

The College Creek Ranger Station, near Imnaha, Oregon, United States, outside of Enterprise, Oregon, was built in 1935. It is located along the Imnaha River in the Wallowa–Whitman National Forest. It includes rustic architecture of USDA. It was listed on the National Register of Historic Places in 1991; the listing includes four contributing buildings.

It was designed by the U.S. Forest Service's Pacific Northwest Region architects and was built by the Civilian Conservation Corps. This station "is a good example of an architectural locution invested with special aesthetic and associative values by the [U.S. Forest Service] that created it."

== See also ==
- National Register of Historic Places listings in Wallowa County, Oregon
- Media related to College Creek Ranger Station at Wikimedia Commons
