= Promise, Oregon =

Unincorporated community in the state of Oregon, United States

- Unincorporated community
- Location within Oregon Location within the United States
- Coordinates: 45.841°N 117.544°W
- Country: United States
- State: Oregon
- County: Wallowa
- Established: 1896
- Elevation: 3,592 ft (1,095 m)
- Time zone: UTC-8 (Pacific (PST))
  - Summer (DST): UTC-7 (PDT)

Promise is an unincorporated community in northern Wallowa County, Oregon, United States. It is located about 25 road miles south of Troy and 8 miles north of Maxville on a remote ridge south of the Grande Ronde River.

The area was first homesteaded by John C. Phillips and Daniel W. Mann in about 1891. Mann called the area "Promised Land" and "Land of Promise", so when a post office was established in 1896, it was called "Promise". Thomas C. Miller was the first postmaster, and the office ran until 1944. At one time Promise had a school.

An annual Promise reunion is held for residents, descendants and friends at the Promise Grange Hall.
