= Oregon Route 350 =

State highway in Wallowa County, Oregon, US

Oregon Route 350
- Route 350 highlighted in red

Route information
- Maintained by ODOT
- Length: 29.36 mi (47.25 km)
- Existed: 2003–present

Major junctions
- West end: OR 82 and OR 351 in Joseph
- East end: Upper Imnaha Road and Grizzly Ridge Road in Imnaha

Location
- Country: United States
- State: Oregon
- County: Wallowa

Highway system
- Oregon Highways; Interstate; US; State; Named; Scenic
← OR 339	→ OR 351

Oregon Route 350 is an Oregon state highway running from Joseph to Imnaha. OR 350 is known as the Little Sheep Creek Highway No. 350 (see Oregon highways and routes). It is 29.36 miles (47.25 km) long and runs east–west, entirely within Wallowa County.

OR 350 was established in 2003 as part of Oregon's project to assign route numbers to highways that previously were not assigned, and, as of July 2022, ODOT is posting route shields.

== Route description ==
OR 350 begins at an intersection with OR 82 and OR 351 in Joseph and heads east and northeast to Imnaha, where it ends at the intersection of Upper Imnaha Road and Grizzly Ridge Road.

It is part of Hells Canyon Scenic Byway.

== History ==
OR 350 was assigned to the Little Sheep Creek Highway in 2003.

== Major intersections ==
The entire route is in Wallowa County.

Location	mi	km	Destinations	Notes
Joseph	0.00	0.00	OR 82 / OR 351	
Imnaha	29.36	47.25	End state maintenance	
1.000 mi = 1.609 km; 1.000 km = 0.621 mi
