= Minam, Oregon =

Unincorporated community in the state of Oregon, United States

Coordinates: 45.62194°N 117.72222°W

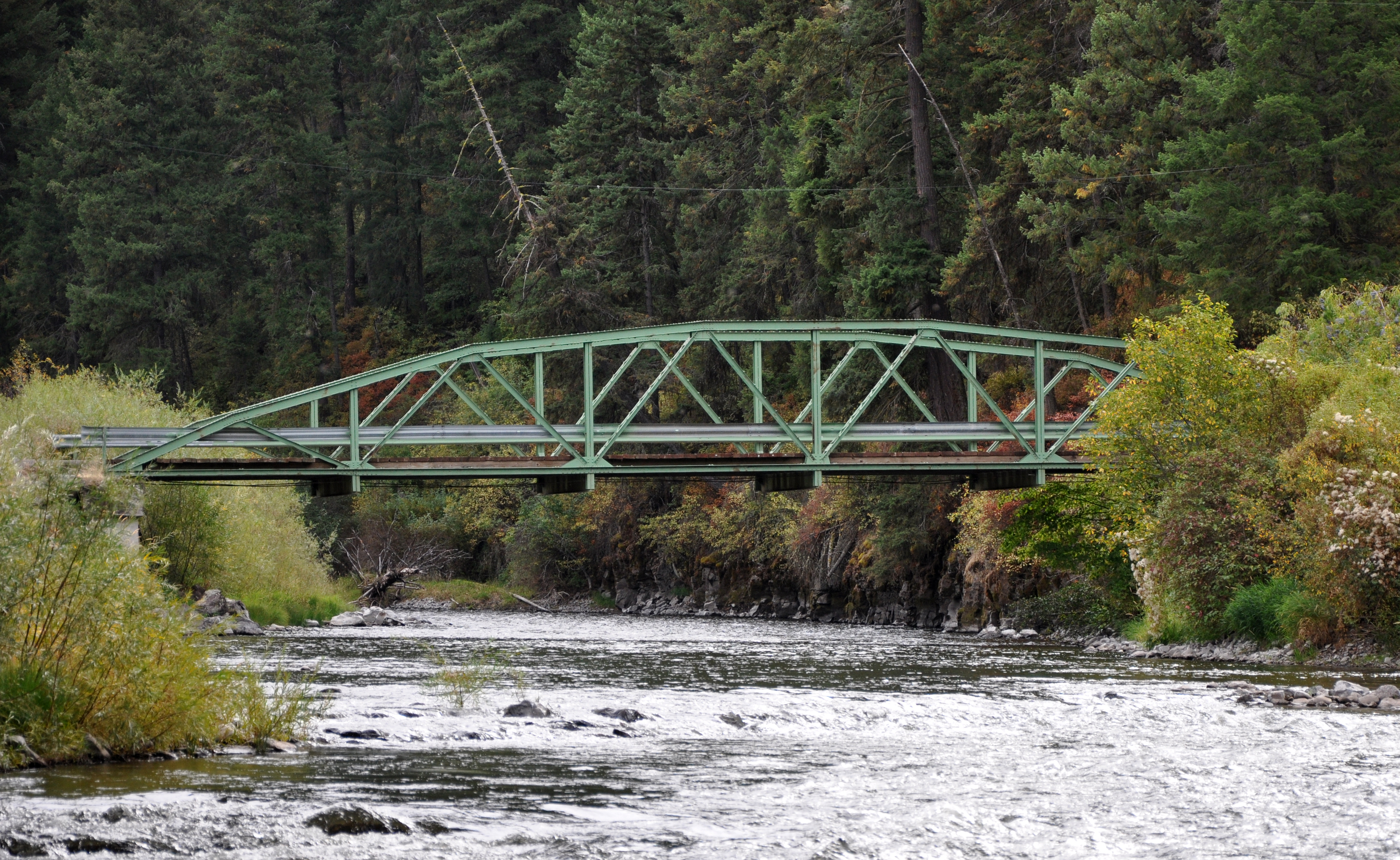
Bridge over the Wallowa River at Minam

Minam is an unincorporated community in northwestern Wallowa County, Oregon, United States. It is located at the confluence of the Minam and Wallowa rivers, north of the Wallowa Mountains on Oregon Route 82. Minam is approximately 20 miles (32 km) Northeast of La Grande.

Minam was named after the Minam River, which in turn was named for the Native American name for the locality E-mi-ne-mah, which described a valley or canyon where a plant used for food that resembled a small sunflower was abundant. The form "Minam River" was used as early as 1864. Minam post office was established in 1890, closed in 1891, and was reestablished in 1910. Minam was platted in 1907; a railroad branch through the community to Joseph, completed in 1908, probably prompted the reopening of the post office.

== Climate ==
This region experiences warm (but not hot) and dry summers, with no average monthly temperatures above 71.6 °F. According to the Köppen Climate Classification system, Minam has a warm-summer Mediterranean climate, abbreviated "Csb" on climate maps.
