= Oregon Route 82 =

State highway in northeastern Oregon, US

Oregon Route 82
- Route 82 highlighted in red

Route information
- Maintained by ODOT
- Length: 70.74 mi (113.84 km)
- Existed: 1932–present

Major junctions
- West end: US 30 in La Grande
- I-84 in La Grande; OR 237 in Island City; OR 204 in Elgin; OR 3 in Enterprise
- East end: OR 350 / OR 351 in Joseph

Location
- Country: United States
- State: Oregon
- Counties: Union, Wallowa

Highway system
- Oregon Highways; Interstate; US; State; Named; Scenic
← I-82	→ I-84

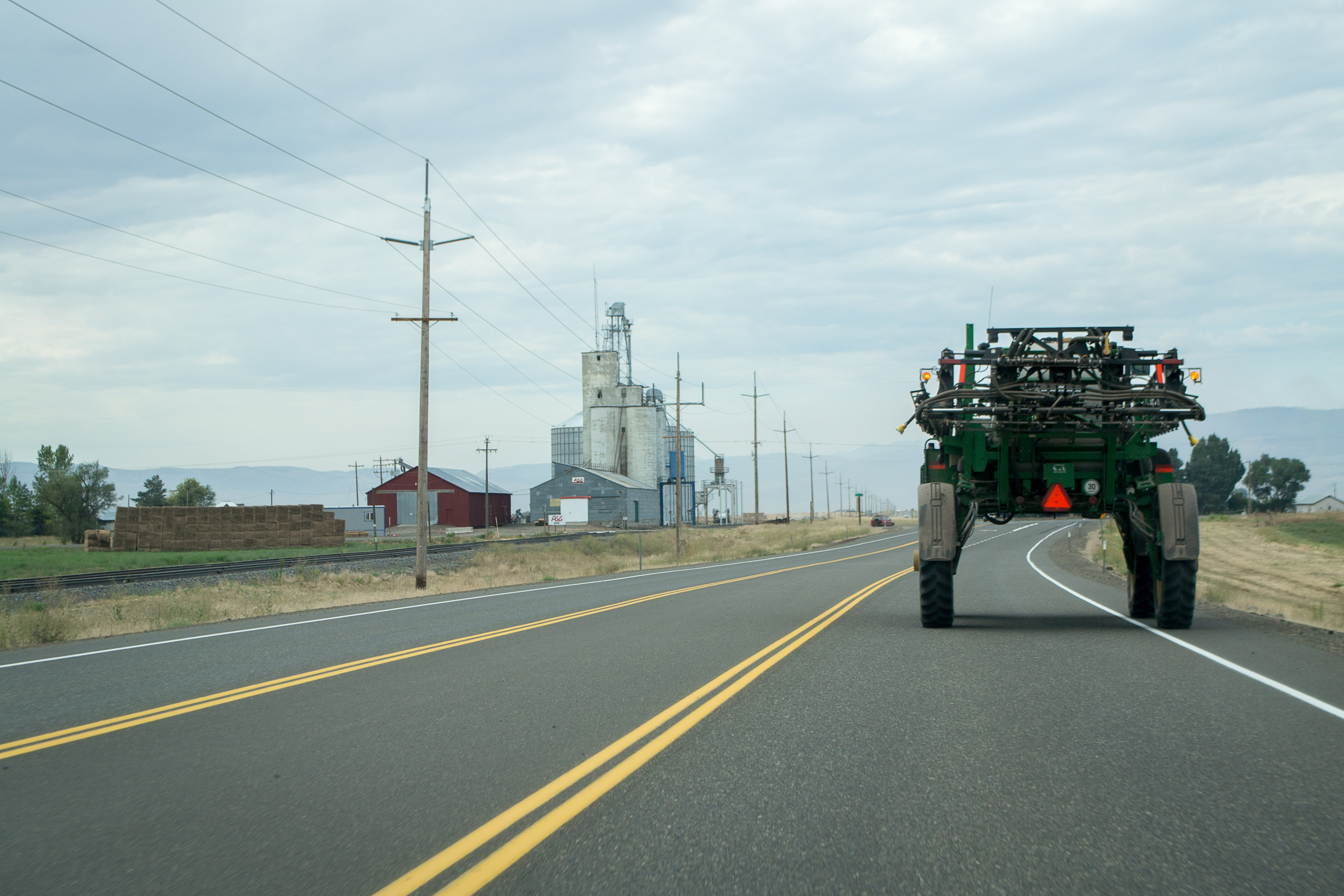
Oregon Route 82 near Alicel

Oregon Route 82 (OR 82) is a 70.74-mile-long (113.84 km) state highway in the northeastern part of the U.S. state of Oregon. It travels from U.S. Route 30 (US 30) at La Grande to an intersection with Oregon Routes 350 and 351 in Joseph. It is known as the Wallowa Lake Highway No. 10 (see Oregon highways and routes). OR 82 is part of the Hells Canyon Scenic Byway.

OR 82 is the main route from remote Wallowa County to La Grande which serves as a transportation hub, providing access to main roads such as Interstate 84 (I-84) and US 30. It also sees extra tourist traffic in the summer, which mostly consists of travelers to Wallowa Lake, which is south of Joseph.

== Route description ==
OR 82 begins at an intersection with U.S. Route 30 (Adams Avenue). It heads east underneath Interstate 84 into Island City, where it turns north at an intersection with OR 237, which continues east to Cove. Once out of Island City, it curves northeast and passes through Imbler, Elgin, and enters Wallowa County at Minam. From there, the highway curves southeast into the Wallowa Valley, passing through the towns of Wallowa, Lostine, and Enterprise before ending in Joseph. OR 351 from Joseph to the Wallowa Lake State Park at the south end of the Lake was originally part of the OR 82 Highway.

== Major intersections ==
County	Location	mi	km	Destinations	Notes
Union	La Grande	0.00	0.00	US 30 – La Grande, Pendleton, Baker City	
Union	La Grande	0.89	1.43	I-84 – Pendleton, Baker City	Interchange
Union	Island City	2.41	3.88	OR 237 – Cove	
Union	Elgin	20.02	32.22	OR 204 – Palmer Junction, Spout Springs, Tollgate, Weston	
Wallowa	Enterprise	64.40	103.64	OR 3 north – Flora, Lewiston	
Wallowa	Joseph	70.74	113.84	OR 350 – Ferguson Ridge, Halfway, Imnaha; OR 351 – Wallowa Lake	
1.000 mi = 1.609 km; 1.000 km = 0.621 mi
