= Mount Howard (Oregon) =

Mountain in Oregon, United States

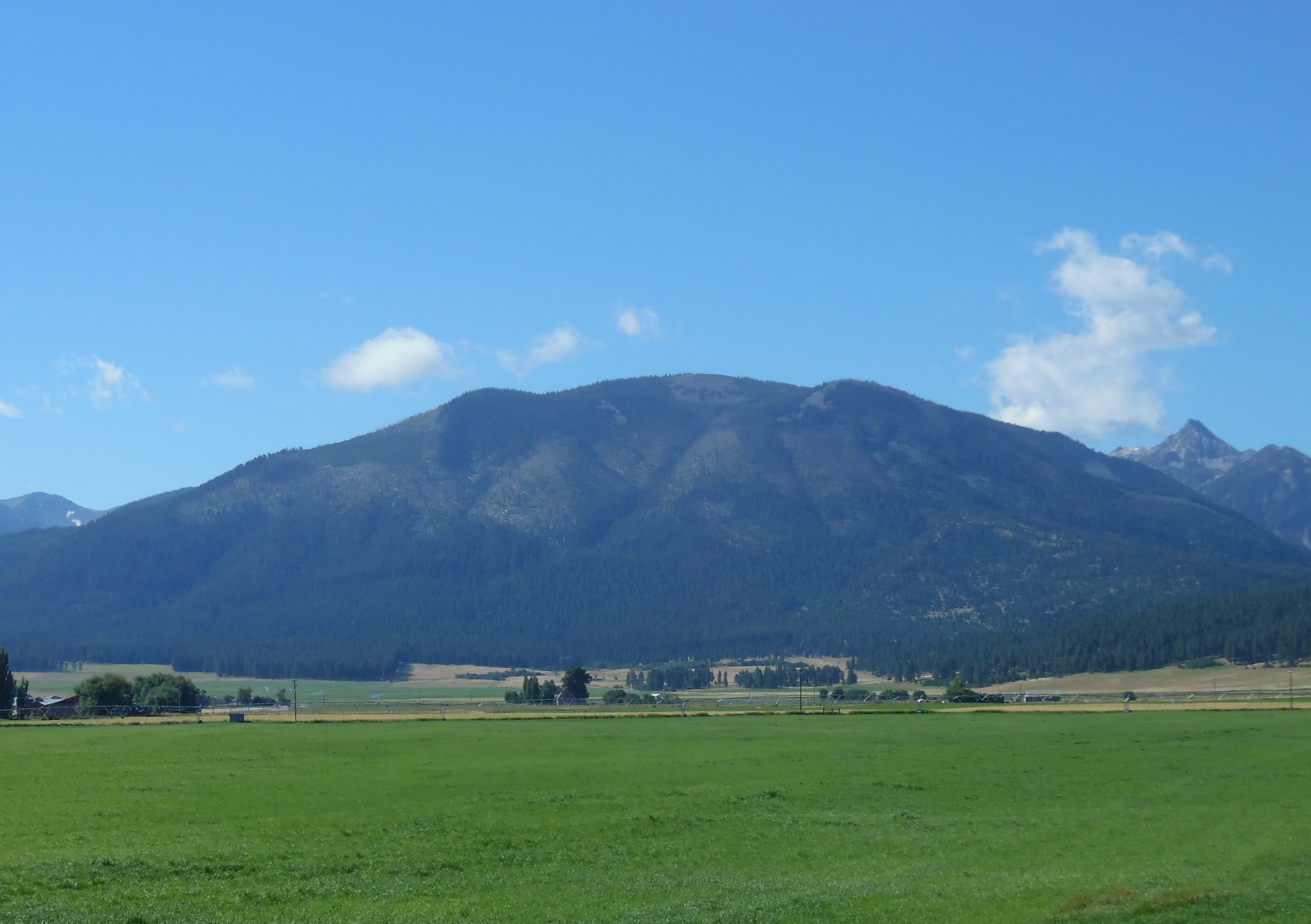
- North side of Mount Howard

Highest point
- Elevation: 8,261 ft (2,518 m) NAVD 88
- Prominence: 136 ft (41 m)
- Coordinates: 45°15′40″N 117°10′44″W

Geography
- Location within Oregon
- Location: Wallowa County, Oregon, U.S.
- Parent range: Wallowa Mountains
- Topo map: USGS Joseph

U.S. National Natural Landmark
- Designated: June 2016

Mount Howard is located in the Wallowa region of northeast Oregon. The mountain is home to Wallowa Lake Tramway, the steepest tram in North America. At the top of the mountain, there is a restaurant called the Summit Grill and Alpine Patio. Mount Howard was named for Civil War general Oliver Otis Howard.

The 1,084-acre (4.39 km^{2}) Mount Howard-East Peak area was designated as a National Natural Landmark in June 2016, in recognition of its botanically diverse montane grassland habitats and populations of endemic and rare plant species.

== See also ==
- List of National Natural Landmarks in Oregon
