= Wallowa Lake State Park =

State park in Oregon, United States

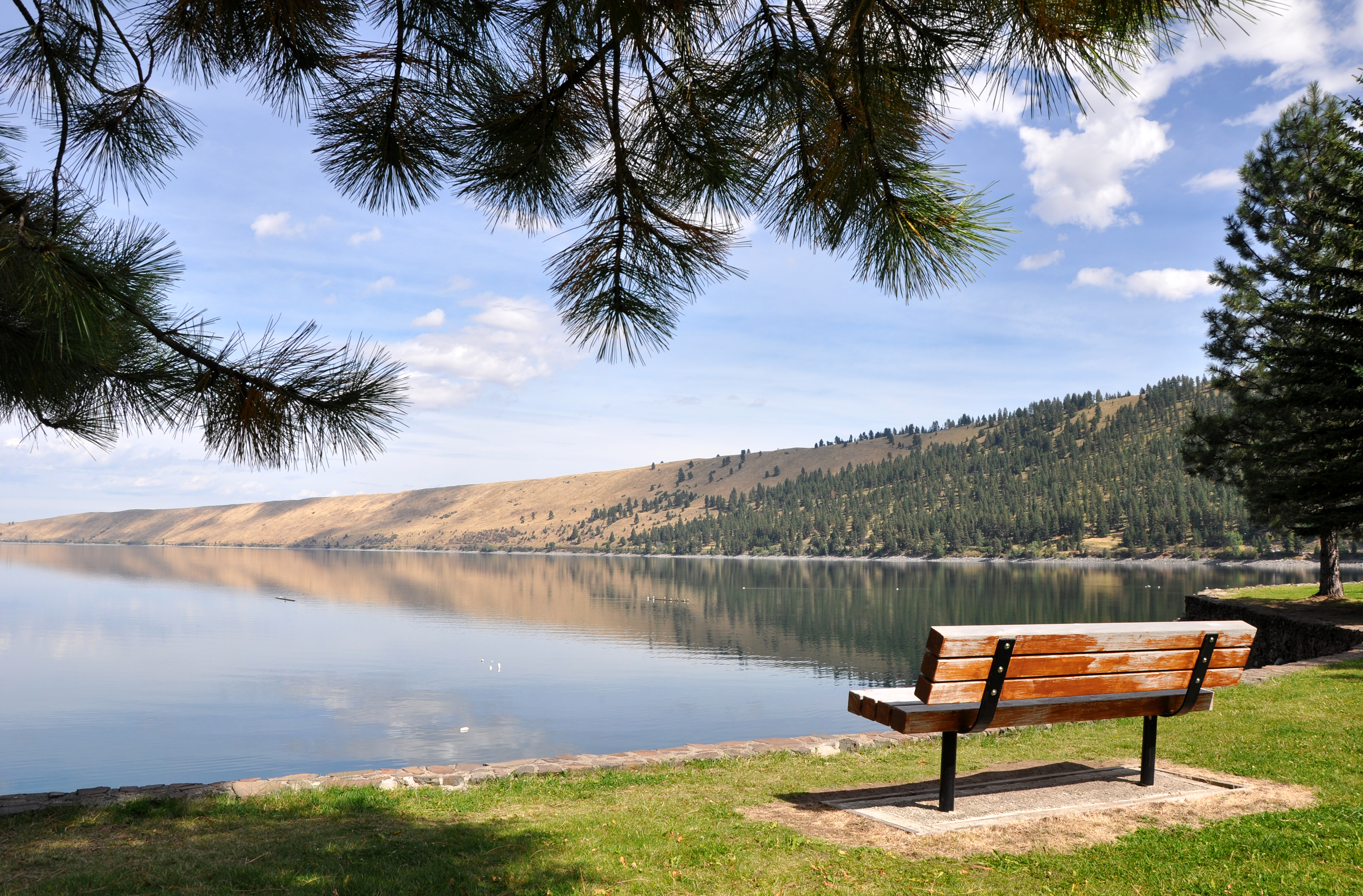
- View of the lake from the state park marina
- Interactive map of Wallowa Lake State Park
- Type: State park
- Location: Wallowa County, Oregon, United States
- Nearest city: Joseph
- Coordinates: 45°16′08″N 117°12′42″W
- Operator: Oregon Parks and Recreation Department
- Status: open

Wallowa Lake State Park is a state park located in northeast Oregon in the United States. It is at the southern shore of Wallowa Lake, near the city of Joseph in Wallowa County. The town of Wallowa Lake is situated next to the park.

Wallowa Lake State Park has a variety of activities, including hiking wilderness trails, horseback riding, bumper boat, canoeing, miniature golf, and a tramway to the top of one of the mountains (a rise of 3,700 feet). Wildlife is abundant in the area.

== Amenities ==
There is overnight camping for tents and RVs with full hookup. The campground has yurts, cabins, tepees, and reservable group tents. There is swimming and a boat ramp for the lake.

== See also ==
- List of Oregon state parks
