= Maxville, Oregon =

Unincorporated community in the state of Oregon, United States

- Unincorporated community
- Location within Oregon Location within the United States
- Coordinates: 45.746°N 117.557°W
- Country: United States
- State: Oregon
- County: Wallowa
- Elevation: 4,058 ft (1,237 m)
- Time zone: UTC-8 (Pacific (PST))
  - Summer (DST): UTC-7 (PDT)
- ZIP code: 97828
- Area codes: 458 and 541

Maxville is an unincorporated community and former company town in northern Wallowa County, Oregon, USA. The town was built in 1923 by the Bowman-Hicks Lumber Company, a large Southern firm with timber and mills in Arkansas, Louisiana and Mississippi. Bowman-Hicks hired experienced loggers, regardless of race, from the Southern United States. In keeping with the Jim Crow practices common in the South at that time, Maxville had segregated neighborhoods, schools and baseball teams.

== History ==
=== Creation of the town ===
The southern Bowman-Hicks Lumber Company was looking to profit from the abundant logging opportunity in the Pacific Northwest. To ensure a reliable workforce, workers from the south were brought in to create a railroad company town. The name "Maxville" evolved from its original name, "Mac's Town", based on the superintendent of the lumber company, J.D. Macmillan. Before logging and timbering, most Black people were encouraged to work in the coal mines but, as the coal supply was depleted, many African Americans were hired to work with lumber.

=== Logging industry ===
The logging and timber industry in Oregon was at its peak in the early 1900s. While many of the towns that cropped up around the logging sites were known to overwork employees, those in Oregon were known to help the loggers to sustain their livelihoods. As the timber industry grew in and around Maxville, Oregon, local business looked to support the workers. Food and services were provided to everyone who contributed to the industry, regardless of race. The consistent logging and timber harvesting was eventually difficult to sustain and many investors, such as those in Maxville, encouraged the federal government to increase logging efforts.

== Life in Maxville ==
=== African American involvement ===
Maxville was the only town in Wallowa County to have African American citizens, the total being around 40 to 60 out of a total population of 400. The African Americans who came to Maxville from the south were the first that most of the white citizens met. Due to Jim Crow laws, the town segregated African Americans from Caucasians, including schools, homes and baseball teams. However, the baseball teams came together and won against other counties. The schools in Maxville were the first segregated schools in the state of Oregon. White and black workers were segregated into different jobs, but they worked together at times when logging in the forest. Even though the town had separated race for the most part, the members of Maxville got along with each other.

=== Town life ===
Maxville was work-centric, having many job opportunities for the locals within the woods, mills, farms, ranches and more. The town had very few leisure facilities, the most common form of entertainment and time spent off work being to hunt and fish. The town was rugged due to its location and the conditions of the work for the area. Most buildings had no plumbing or heating, and were infested with bedbugs. The logging conditions were very dangerous, leading to many men being injured from a range of minor to extremely severe. It was common for men to lose their lives while logging, mainly from tree parts falling on top of them.

== Contemporary life ==
Maxville, while once a populated logging town, has since been abandoned. No buildings remain except the offices of the Bowman-Hicks Lumber Company. Each year at the beginning of August, the Annual Maxville Gathering is held at the Wallowa County Fairgrounds, aiming to raise awareness of the town's history. Guest speakers tell personal stories to educate others about Oregon black exclusion laws. There are logging demonstrations, performances and auctions held at the event. The Maxville Heritage Interpretive Center, located in Joseph, Oregon, works to preserve the local history of the town through exhibits, photographs and oral history. It is a non-profit organization and operates with the help of volunteers who have extensive knowledge of Maxville's history.

Maxville is a historically significant location and a resource for students studying archaeology and rural studies. Educational tours of the surrounding wildlife are available for students and the area is being studied by archaeologists. Projects are underway to keep the history alive. In 2012, a grant was awarded to Marv and Rindy Ross to create the fictional musical project, "On Higher Ground", based on Maxwell's history. It delves into how the logging town was segregated. Although unpopulated, Maxwell continues to be a landmark and a tool for educating others in various fields. Archaeologically sensitive portions of the townsite are listed on the National Register of Historic Places.
