= Wallowa–Whitman National Forest =

United States national forest in Oregon

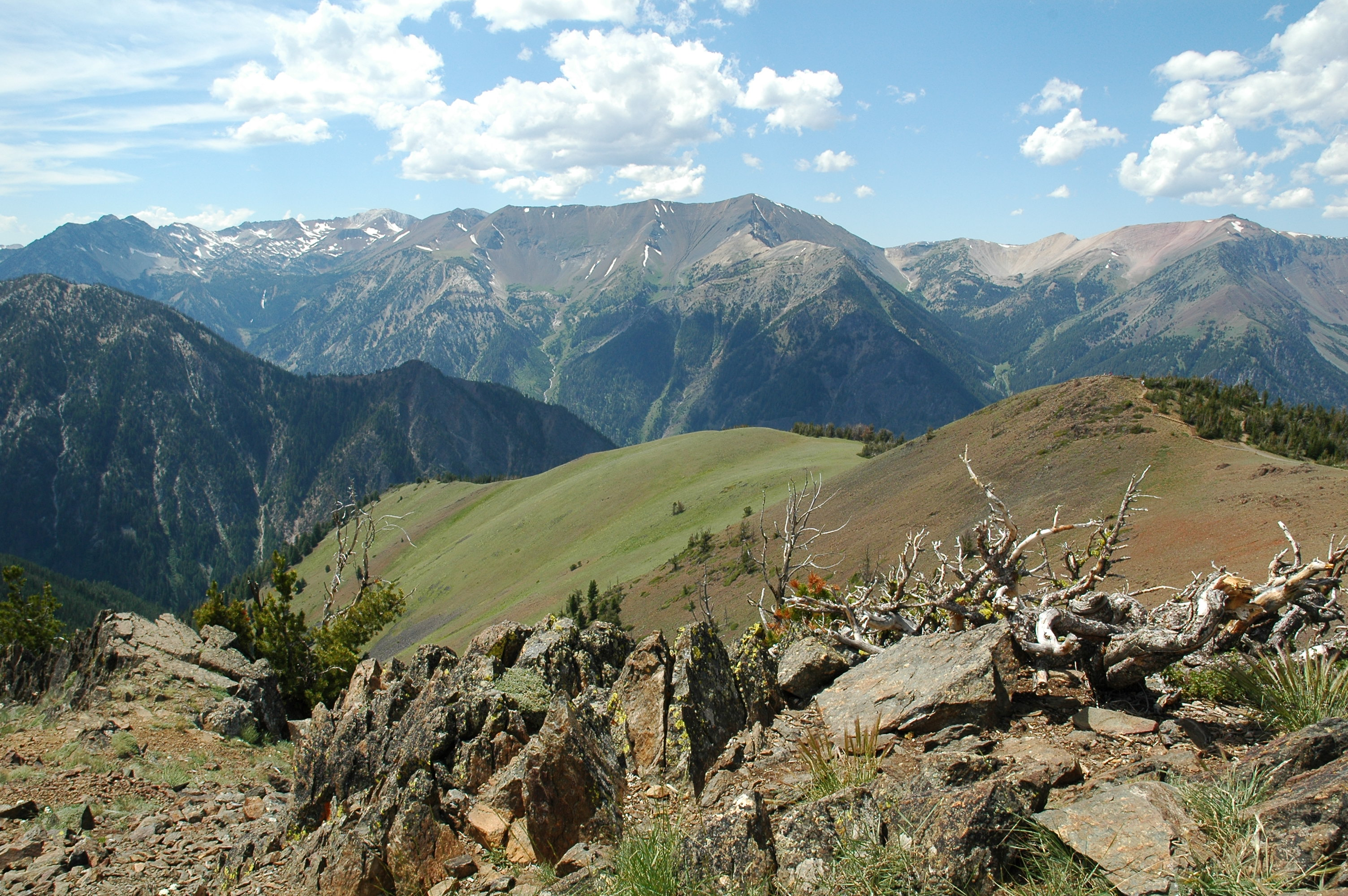
- The Wallowa Mountains in northeastern Oregon

- Location within the United States
- Location: Oregon / Idaho, United States
- Nearest city: Baker City, Oregon
- Coordinates: 45°20′00″N 117°00′05″W
- Area: 2,392,508 acres (9,682 km^{2})
- Established: May 6, 1905
- Visitors: 505,000 (in 2006)
- Governing body: U.S. Forest Service
- Website: Wallowa-Whitman National Forest

The Wallowa–Whitman National Forest is a United States National Forest in the U.S. states of Oregon and Idaho. Formed upon the merger of the Wallowa and Whitman national forests in 1954, it is located in the northeastern corner of Oregon, in Wallowa, Baker, Union, Grant, and Umatilla counties, and includes small areas in Nez Perce and Idaho counties in Idaho. The forest is named for the Wallowa band of the Nez Perce people, who originally lived in the area, and Marcus and Narcissa Whitman, Presbyterian missionaries who settled just to the north in 1836. Forest headquarters are located in Baker City, Oregon with ranger districts in La Grande, Joseph and Baker City.

== Geography ==
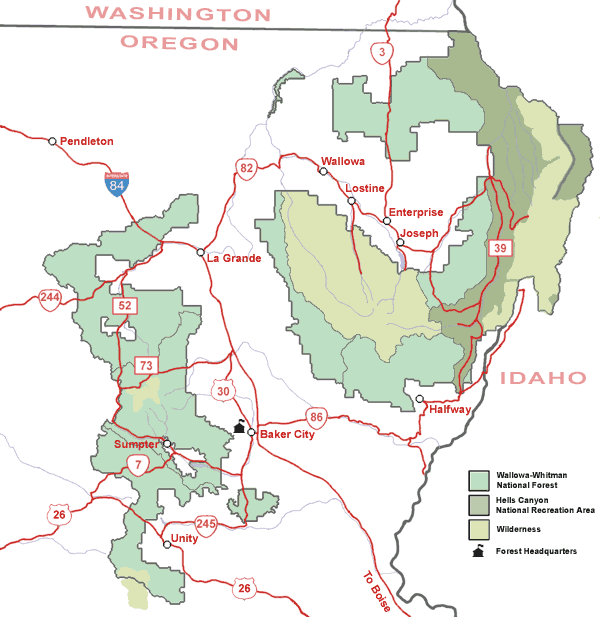
Map of the Wallowa–Whitman National Forest, including the Hells Canyon National Recreation Area and designated wilderness areas

The national forest may be divided into several distinct sections, which together cover 2,300,000 acres (9,300 km^{2}) of land, including 600,000 acres (2,400 km^{2}) of designated wilderness.

A large section of the forest is located in the rugged Wallowa Mountains, south of Joseph, Oregon, in the upper reaches of the Wallowa, Minam, and Imnaha drainage basins. The alpine area in the heart of the mountain range is designated as the Eagle Cap Wilderness. Bordering the national forest on the north, Wallowa Lake State Park is located on the shore of Wallowa Lake.

A smaller section of the forest is located north of Enterprise, Oregon, along Joseph Canyon. This section is joined to the first by the Hells Canyon National Recreation Area, which protects the stretch of the Snake River known as Hells Canyon, the deepest gorge in North America. The recreation area includes portions of the Nez Perce, Payette, and Wallowa–Whitman national forests, but is managed solely by the Wallowa–Whitman National Forest. It contains the Hells Canyon Wilderness, jointly managed by the Forest Service and the Bureau of Land Management. The Hells Canyon Scenic Byway passes through the national forest on Forest Service Road 39.

Another large section of the Wallowa–Whitman National Forest is located west of La Grande and Baker City, Oregon, in the Elkhorn Mountains, a sub-range of the Blue Mountains. It borders the Malheur National Forest on the southwest and the Umatilla National Forest on the northwest. This area includes the upper reaches of the John Day and Grande Ronde rivers. The North Fork John Day and Monument Rock wildernesses are jointly managed by the adjacent national forests. The historic gold mining city of Sumpter is surrounded by the Wallowa–Whitman on all sides.

== Ecology ==
The Wallowa–Whitman National Forest is home to 36 fish species, 236 bird species, over 90 mammal species, 26 reptile-amphibian species, and roughly 1,500 plant species.

Wildlife habitat is affected by logging and grazing, but significant stands of old-growth forest have survived. A 1993 Forest Service study estimated that the extent of old growth in the forest was 173,000 acres (70,000 ha). Large mammal species include Shiras moose, Rocky Mountain elk, Rocky Mountain bighorn sheep, mountain goat, white-tailed deer, mule deer, black bear, timber wolf, cougar, and bobcat. Several sightings of wolverines, rare within the United States, have been recorded since the 1990s. Smaller mammals include the pika, marten, badger, mink, beaver, river otter, and marmot. Bird species include the peregrine falcon, bald eagle, golden eagle, ferruginous hawk, goshawk, gray-crowned rosy finch, chukar partridge, pileated woodpecker, American dipper, and great gray owl. Rivers and creeks support steelhead and trout.

Plant communities range from low-elevation grasslands and ponderosa pine forest to alpine meadows. Engelmann spruce, mountain hemlock, subalpine fir and whitebark pine can be found in the higher elevations, with Douglas-fir, white fir, western larch, and lodgepole pine elsewhere. Wildflowers include clarkia, Indian paintbrush, sego lily, elephanthead, larkspur, shooting star, and bluebell. Rocky bluffs in the Hells Canyon area support prickly pear cactus and poison ivy.

The Forest Service uses controlled burns before the wildfire season to reduce the natural fuel on the forest floor as part of its management of the forest.

== History ==
The land that is now the Wallowa–Whitman National Forest was first occupied by the Nez Perce people around 1400 CE. The area was the summer home of the Joseph Band of the Nez Perce tribe. The Cayuse, Shoshone and Bannock tribes arrived in the area some time later. The native people hunted deer, elk and bighorn sheep in the Wallowa Valley and surrounding mountains. The first European settlers arrived in the Wallowa Valley in 1860. In 1887, a gang of horse thieves murdered 34 Chinese miners in Chinese Massacre Cove along the Snake River.

In 1905, the Wallowa Forest Reserve and Chesnimnus Reserve were established by President Theodore Roosevelt. The two reserves were later merged to create the Imnaha National Forest on March 1, 1907. On July 1, 1908, the name was changed to Wallowa National Forest, and in 1954 the Wallowa was administratively combined with the Whitman National Forest to create the Wallowa–Whitman. The Whitman had been established on July 1, 1908, from part of the Blue Mountains National Forest. On June 20, 1920, part of Minam National Forest was added.

The Eagle Cap primitive area was established in 1930. The area was designated as a wilderness in 1940. The Wilderness Act in 1964 placed the Eagle Cap Wilderness in the National Wilderness Preservation System. The Eagle Cap was enlarged by 73,410 acres (297 km^{2}) in 1972 and by an additional 67,711 acres (274 km^{2}) in 1984. Its area now totals 350,461 acres (1,418 km^{2}).

The Wallowa Mountains Visitor Center and district office for the national forest, a 20,500-square-foot (1,900 m^{2}) log building in Enterprise, burned to the ground on July 11, 2010.

The forest works with the Nez Perce Tribe of Idaho and the Confederated Tribes of the Umatilla Indian Reservation on cultural and natural resources issues.

== Recreational uses ==
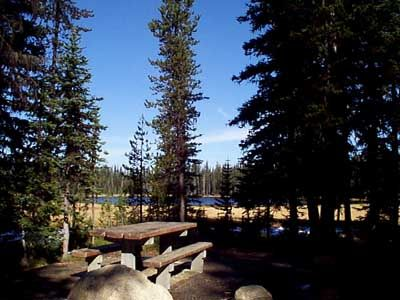
Grande Ronde Lake Campground has eight campsites

The Wallowa–Whitman National Forest is used for hiking, camping, fishing, hunting, and other recreational activities. Anthony Lakes Ski Area is within the forest. The ski area is 40 miles (64 km) northwest of Baker City and 45 miles (72 km) southwest of La Grande. It has groomed slopes for alpine skiing and snowboarding and trails for cross-country skiing and snowshoeing. The forest also has many miles of trail specifically designated for snowmobile use.

The forest has 52 developed campgrounds and 9 day-use picnic areas. Most campgrounds are open from May to October. The Forest Service also operates five rental cabins. Hikers have the choice of 66 trails, with vista points along many of the routes, and 26 interpretive sites. The national forest has seven areas where visitors can enjoy swimming, power boating, rafting, canoeing, and kayaking. There are numerous fishing streams, and hunting is allowed during specific seasons. The Oregon Department of Fish and Wildlife regulates hunting and fishing activities on national forest land.

Some forest activities require permits. The type of permit and its cost depends on the specific recreational activity. A Northwest Forest Pass is required for parking at some high-use trailheads. The cost is $30 for an annual pass or $5 for a day pass. The Forest Service uses the permit revenue for trail maintenance. Permits are also required for firewood cutting, Christmas tree harvesting, and mushroom gathering. A special permit is required to raft on the Snake River.

The forest is home to the annual Eagle Cap Extreme Dog Sled Race, a three-day race that qualifies winners for the Iditarod Trail Sled Dog Race and the Yukon Quest race in Alaska and Yukon Territory. It is also home to the Wallowa Lake Tramway.

== Wilderness areas ==
There are four designated wilderness areas within the Wallowa–Whitman National Forest. Three of these extend into neighboring national forests or onto land that is managed by the Bureau of Land Management.

- Eagle Cap Wilderness
- Hells Canyon Wilderness (partly in Nez Perce NF, Payette NF, or on BLM land)
- Monument Rock Wilderness (mostly in Malheur NF)
- North Fork John Day Wilderness (mostly in Umatilla NF)

== See also ==
- List of national forests of the United States
