= Imnaha, Oregon =

Unincorporated community in the state of Oregon, United States

Imnaha
- Unincorporated area
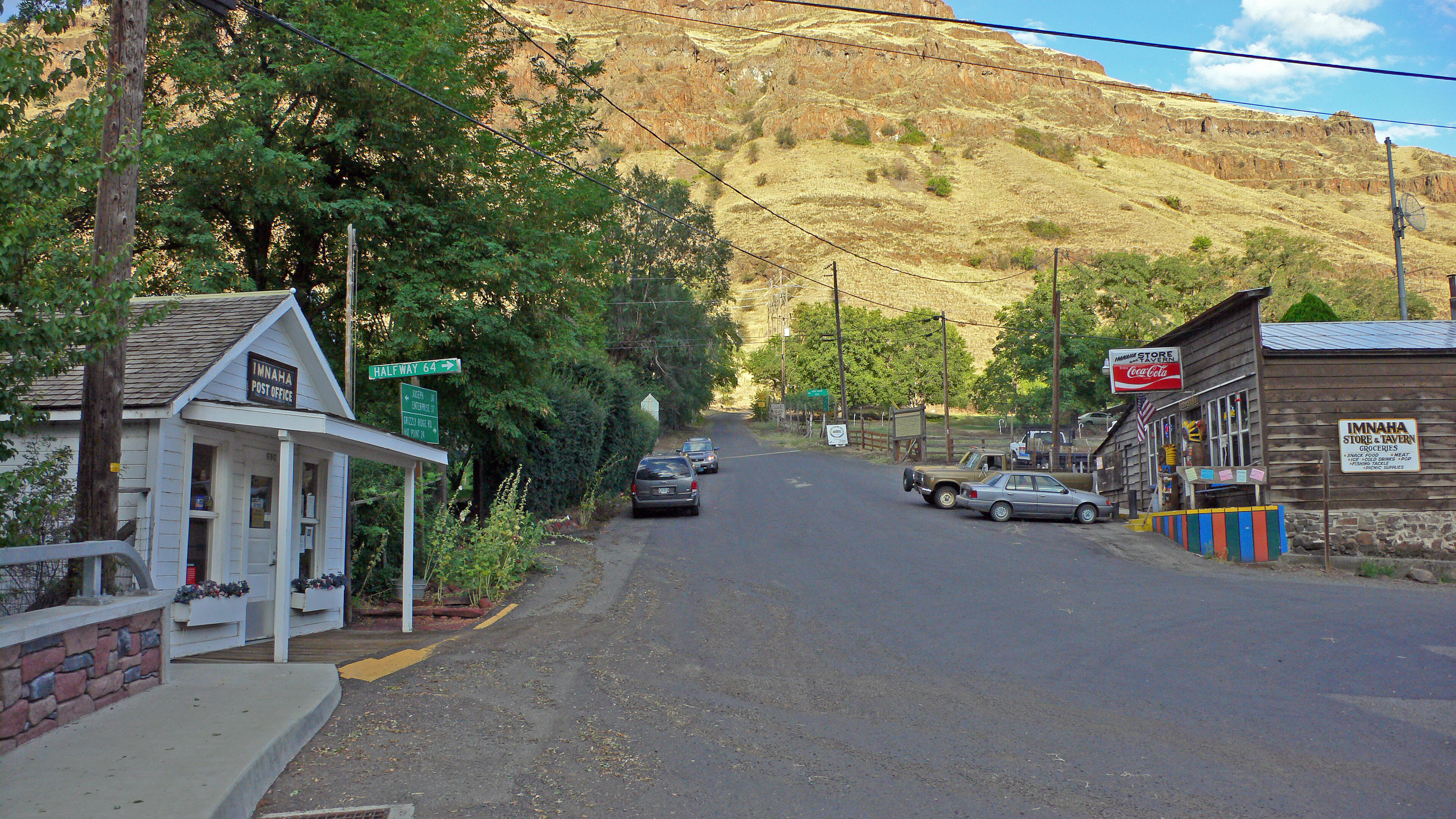

- Location within Oregon Location within the United States
- Coordinates: 45°33′34″N 116°50′0″W
- Country: United States
- State: Oregon
- County: Wallowa
- Time zone: UTC-8 (Pacific)
  - Summer (DST): UTC-7 (Pacific)
- ZIP code: 97842
- Area codes: 458 and 541

Imnaha is an unincorporated community at the confluence of Big Sheep Creek and the Imnaha River in Wallowa County, Oregon, United States. Its elevation is 1,978 feet (603 m). Oregon Route 350 connects Imnaha to the nearest incorporated city, Joseph, 30 miles (48 km) to the west. Imnaha is best known as the gateway to the Hat Point scenic lookout on Hells Canyon at the Snake River.

The name Imnaha means "land ruled over by Imna"; Imna was a local Native American subchief. The post office in Imnaha opened January 4, 1885, but the townsite was not established until 1901; it was platted in 1902.

Imnaha is the easternmost settlement in Oregon; it lies at the foot of the Hell's Canyon of the Snake River and is accessible via Oregon Route 350.

== Climate ==
This region experiences hot and dry summers. According to the Köppen climate classification, Imnaha has a warm-summer Mediterranean climate, Csb on climate maps.

== Notable person ==
- Eugene Pallette, an actor of the silent films era who became a character actor following the transition to talking pictures, once lived on a ranch in the area.
