= Old Chief Joseph =

Nez Percé leader

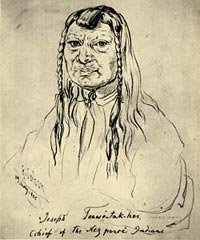
Old Chief Joseph

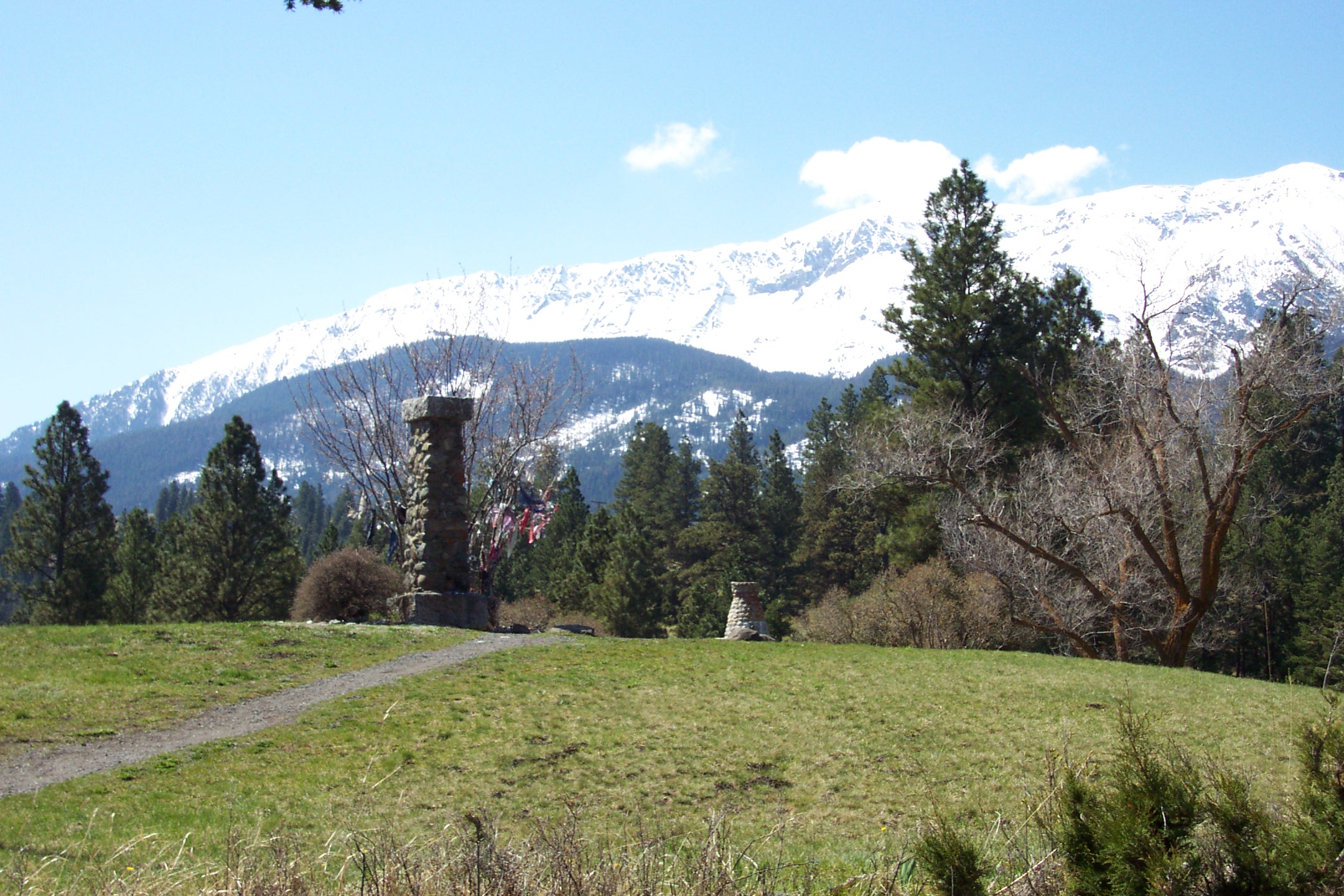
Gravesite of Old Joseph, a National Historic Landmark

Tuekakas, (also tiwi-teqis, meaning "senior warrior") commonly known as Old Chief Joseph or Joseph the Elder (c. 1785–1871), was a Native American leader of the Wallowa Band of the Nez Perce. Old Joseph was one of the first Nez Percé converts to Christianity and a vigorous advocate of the tribe's early peace with whites. In 1855 he aided Washington's territorial governor and set up a Nez Percé reservation that expanded from Oregon into Idaho. The Nez Perce agreed to give up a section of their tribal lands in return for an assurance whites would not intrude upon the sacred Wallowa Valley.

Nevertheless, in 1863, following a gold rush in Nez Percé territory, the federal government took back approximately 6 million acres (24,000 km^{2}) of this land. That confined the Nez Percé to a 750,000-acre (3,000 km^{2}) reservation in Idaho, which was only one tenth its previous size. Old Joseph argued that this second treaty was never approved by his people. Feeling deceived, Old Joseph condemned the United States, slashed his American flag, shredded his Bible, and declined to move his band from the Wallowa Valley or to sign the treaty that would make the new reservation boundaries legitimate. He died in 1871, though his gravestone got it wrong and said he died in 1872.

He was the father of hinmahtoo-yahlatkekht, also known as "Young Joseph" or Chief Joseph.

== See also ==
- Joseph Gale
- Ollokot, other son
