= Wallowa Lake, Oregon =

Unincorporated community in the state of Oregon, United States

- Census-designated place (CDP)
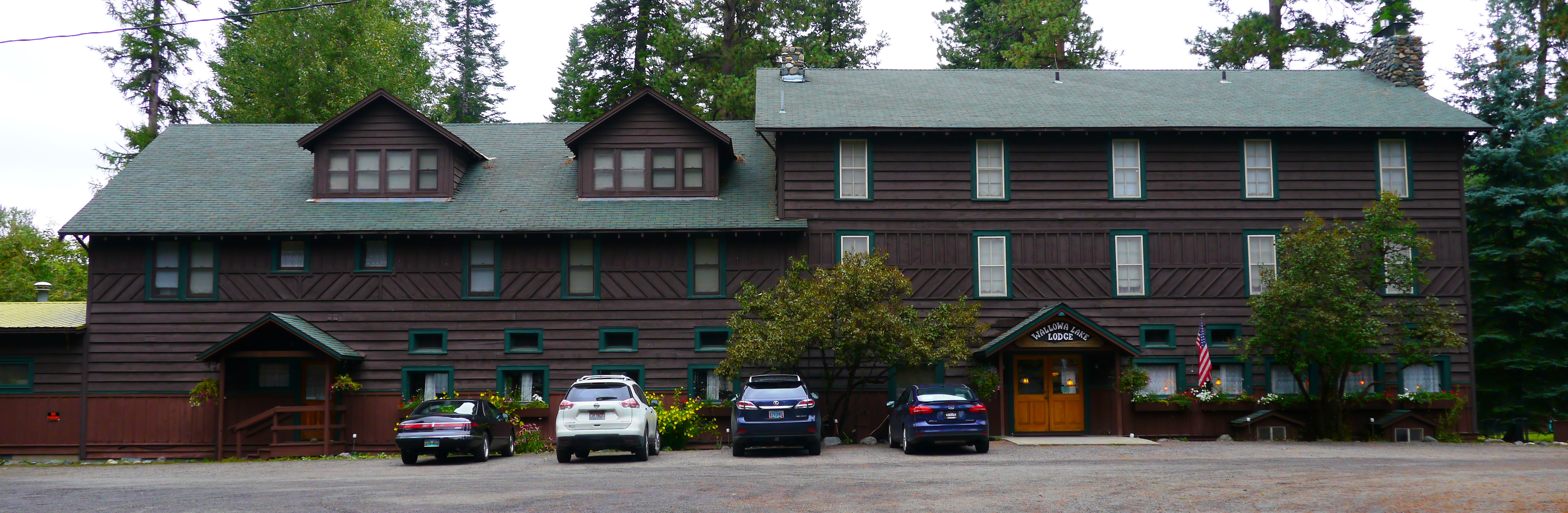
- Wallowa Lake Lodge

- Location within Oregon
- Coordinates: 45°18′15″N 117°12′42″W
- Country: United States
- State: Oregon
- County: Wallowa

Area
  - Total: 4.00 sq mi (10.36 km^{2})
  - Land: 1.83 sq mi (4.75 km^{2})
  - Water: 2.17 sq mi (5.61 km^{2})
- Elevation: 4,380 ft (1,340 m)

Population (2020)
  - Total: 72
  - Density: 39.3/sq mi (15.16/km^{2})
- Time zone: UTC-8 (Pacific (PST))
  - Summer (DST): UTC-7 (PDT)
- FIPS code: 41-78160
- GNIS feature ID: 2584429

Wallowa Lake is a census-designated place (CDP) and unincorporated community in Wallowa County, Oregon, United States. It is located on the south end of Wallowa Lake, and is a small community made up of vacation homes, lodging, restaurants, as well as other small businesses. As of the 2020 census, Wallowa Lake had a population of 72.

== History ==
Wallowa Lake gained popularity among gold miners and soon began attracting guests from other areas. Seeing an emerging tourism market, entrepreneurs began building businesses at the lake. Among those built was the Wonderland Inn, now known as the Wallowa Lake Lodge. The Wonderland Inn was developed in 1923 as an amusement park at the south end of the lake. The park contained a restaurant, store, bowling alley, dance hall, outdoor movie theater, horse drawn carousel and cabins for those wishing to stay overnight. An 18-passenger boat carried the guests who arrived in Joseph (which lies at the north end of the lake) down the entire four mile stretch of Wallowa Lake, finally arriving at the inn and amusement park.

The amusement park operated until 1940, when snowfall from an unusually harsh winter crushed most of the buildings and rendered the park inoperable. However, the inn survived the winter and still remains in operation, though renamed the Wallowa Lake Lodge. The area at the south end of the lake continued to be developed commercially. Several more stores, lodges, restaurants, and rental cabins were built in the following years, turning the south end of the lake into a tourist community.

The businesses at the south end of Wallowa Lake are members of a non-profit tourism association. This association maintains a website, supports tourism in the area and works to solve issues across the lake community.

There are 2,000 to 3,000 people residing at the south end of Wallowa Lake in summer with all businesses open. However, from October through March there are less than 40 year-round residences at the south end of the lake, and only a few lodging businesses remain open.

== Demographics ==
Historical population
Census	Pop.	Note	%±
2020	72		—
U.S. Decennial Census

As of the census of 2010, there were 62 people, 37 households, and 19 families residing in the CDP. The racial makeup of the CDP was 96.8% White (95.2% non-Hispanic White) 1.6% Native American, and 1.6% from two or more races (White and Asian). Hispanic or Latino of any race were 1.6% of the population.

There were 37 households, of which 0.0% had children under the age of 18 living with them, 48.6% were married couples living together, 2.7% had a female householder with no husband present, 0.0% had a male householder with no wife present, and 48.6% were non-families. 43.2% of all households were made up of individuals, and 29.7% had someone living alone who was 65 years of age or older. The average household size was 1.68 and the average family size was 2.21.

The median age in the city was 64.5 years. 0.0% of residents were under the age of 18; 0.0% were between the ages of 18 and 24; 4.8% were from 25 to 44; 45.2% were from 45 to 64; and 50.1% were 65 years of age or older. The gender makeup of the CDP was 46.8% male and 53.2% female.

== Education ==
It is in the Joseph School District 6.
