= Hells Canyon National Recreation Area =

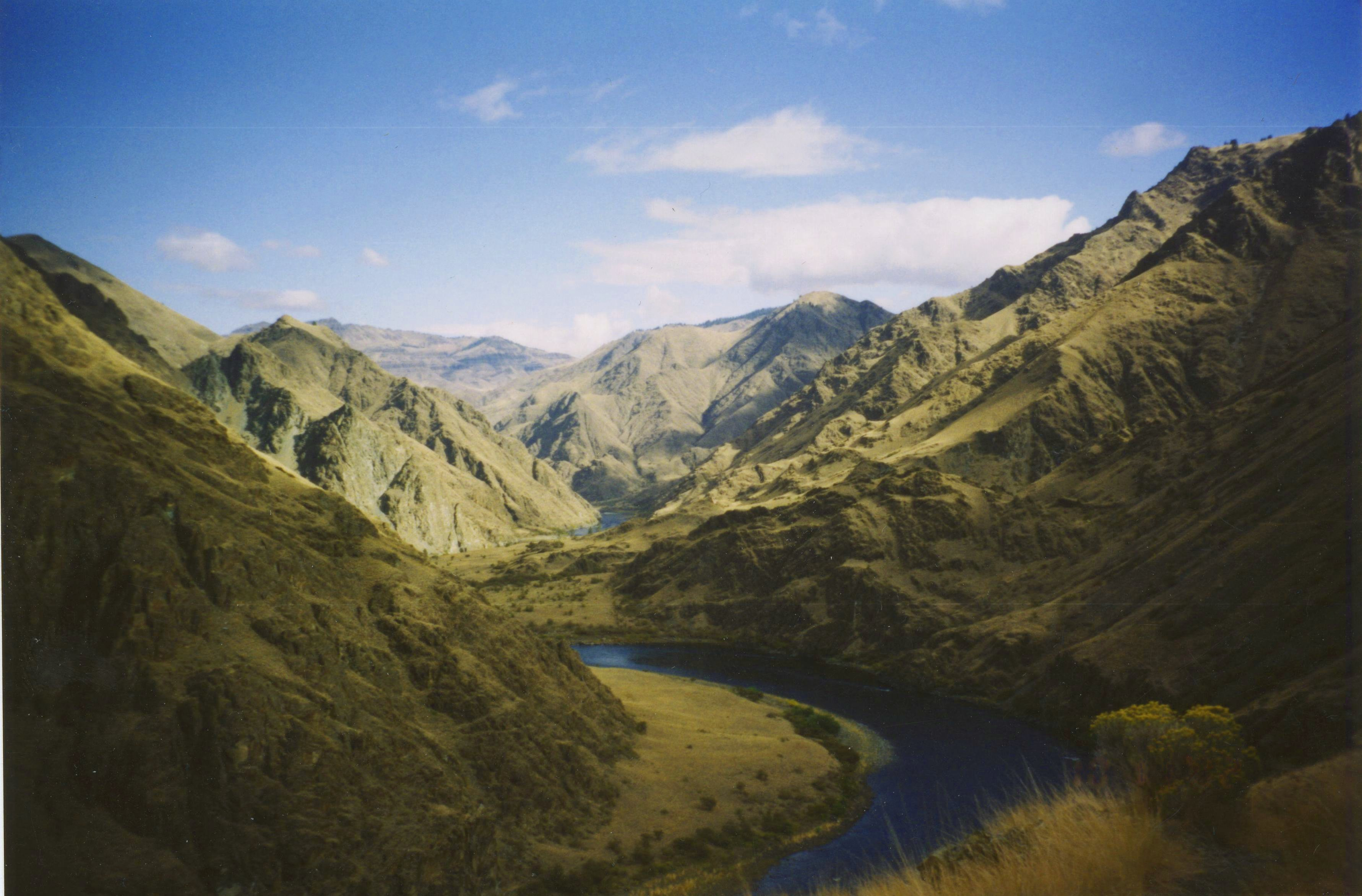
- Hells Canyon in 2002

- Location within the United States Location within Idaho
- Location: Oregon & Idaho, U.S.
- Nearest city: Grangeville, Idaho
- Coordinates: 45.6°N 116.5°W
- Area: 652,488 acres (2,641 km^{2})
- Established: December 31, 1975
- Governing body: U.S. Forest Service
- Website: Hells Canyon NRA

Hells Canyon National Recreation Area is a United States national recreation area on the borders of the U.S. states of Oregon and Idaho. Managed by the U.S. Forest Service as part of the Wallowa-Whitman National Forest, the recreation area was established by Congress and signed by President Gerald Ford in late 1975 to protect the historic and archaeological values of the Hells Canyon area and the area of the Snake River between Hells Canyon Dam and the Oregon–Washington border.

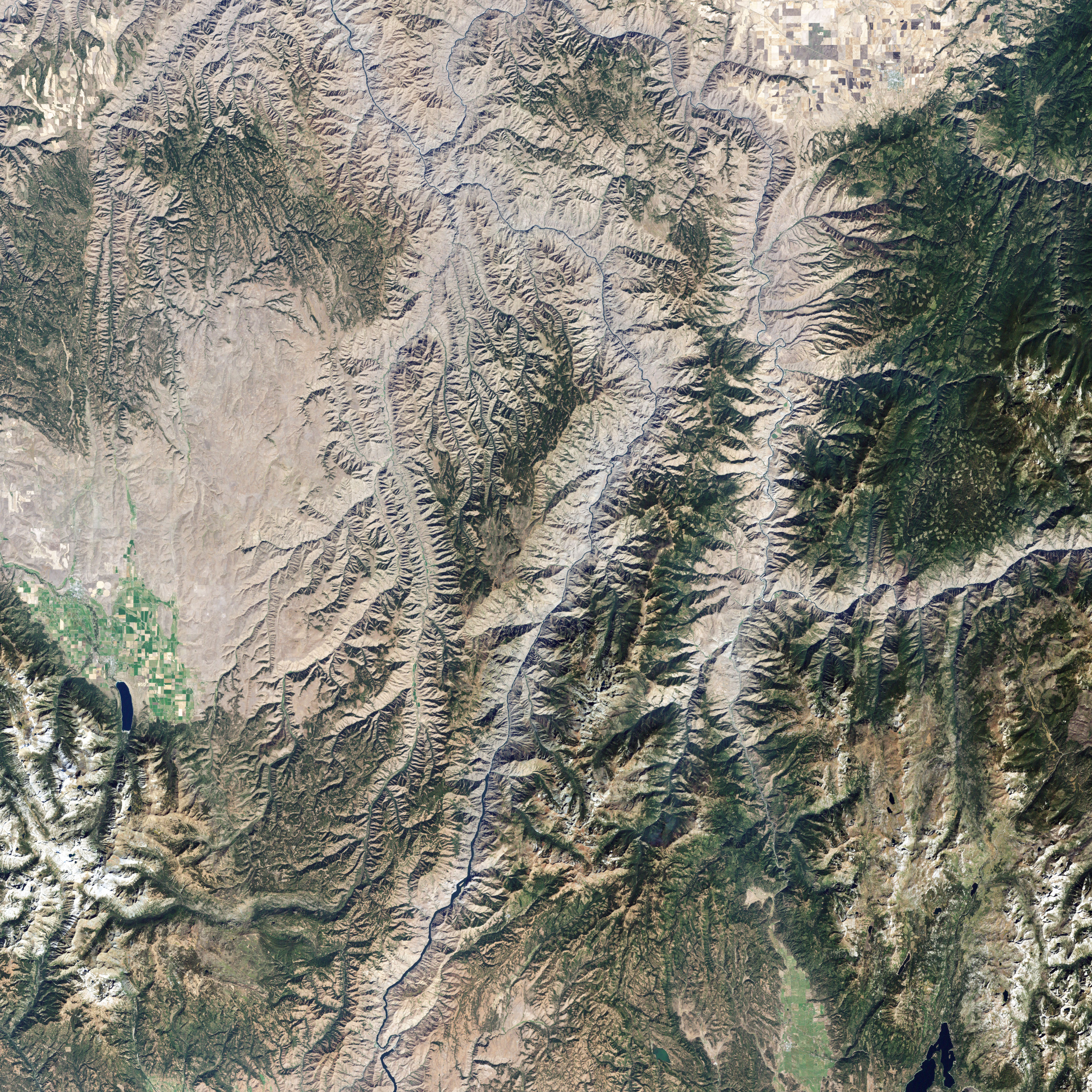
The natural-color image of Hells Canyon was captured by NASA's Landsat-7 satellite on September 19, 2002.

Roughly 215,000 acres (335 mi^{2}; 870 km^{2}) of the recreation area are designated the Hells Canyon Wilderness. There are nearly 900 miles (1,400 km) of hiking trails in the recreation area. The largest portion of the area lies in eastern Wallowa County, Oregon. Smaller portions lie in southwestern Idaho County, Idaho, northwestern Adams County, Idaho, and northeastern Baker County, Oregon.

It was formally dedicated in 1976, in June in Idaho, and in late July in Oregon.

== Hells Canyon Archeological District ==
- Hells Canyon Archeological District
- U.S. National Register of Historic Places
- U.S. Historic district
- Area: 12,000 acres (49 km^{2})
- NRHP reference No.: 84000984
- Added to NRHP: August 10, 1984

All or partly included in the HCNRA is the Hells Canyon Archeological District, a 12,000-acre (19 mi^{2}; 49 km^{2}) historic district listed on the U.S. National Register of Historic Places. It includes 536 contributing sites, 23 contributing buildings, and 58 other contributing structures.

There are many sites with pictographs, the largest of which are Buffalo Eddy, with more than five hundred pictographs, and Pittsburg Landing, where nearly thirty boulders are covered with them. An interpretive site has a short trail to interpretive panels displaying petroglyphs and pictographs.

== Recreation ==
There are 17 campgrounds in the national recreation area. Pittsburg Landing, with a river boat launch is the only area with RV camping on the Idaho side, and there are seven on the Oregon side.

== Snake River National Recreation Trail ==
The Snake River National Recreation Trail #102 (SRNRT) lies within the Hells Canyon National Recreation Area and along the Idaho side of the Snake River, from near Lamont Springs, downstream, to Pittsburg Landing. The SRNRT was designated in 1980 under the National Trails System Act. It was constructed during the period of the late 1800s to about the 1930s. Access to the SRNRT can be gained via road to the trailhead at Pittsburg Landing on the north end of the trail, or, by boat access near Hells Canyon Dam on the south end of the trail. Access can also be gained via trails leading from Seven Devils Wilderness Area trail head at Windy Saddle (elevation 7200' or 2,200 metres) via either the Granite Creek trails or Sheep Creek trails.
