= Wallowa River =

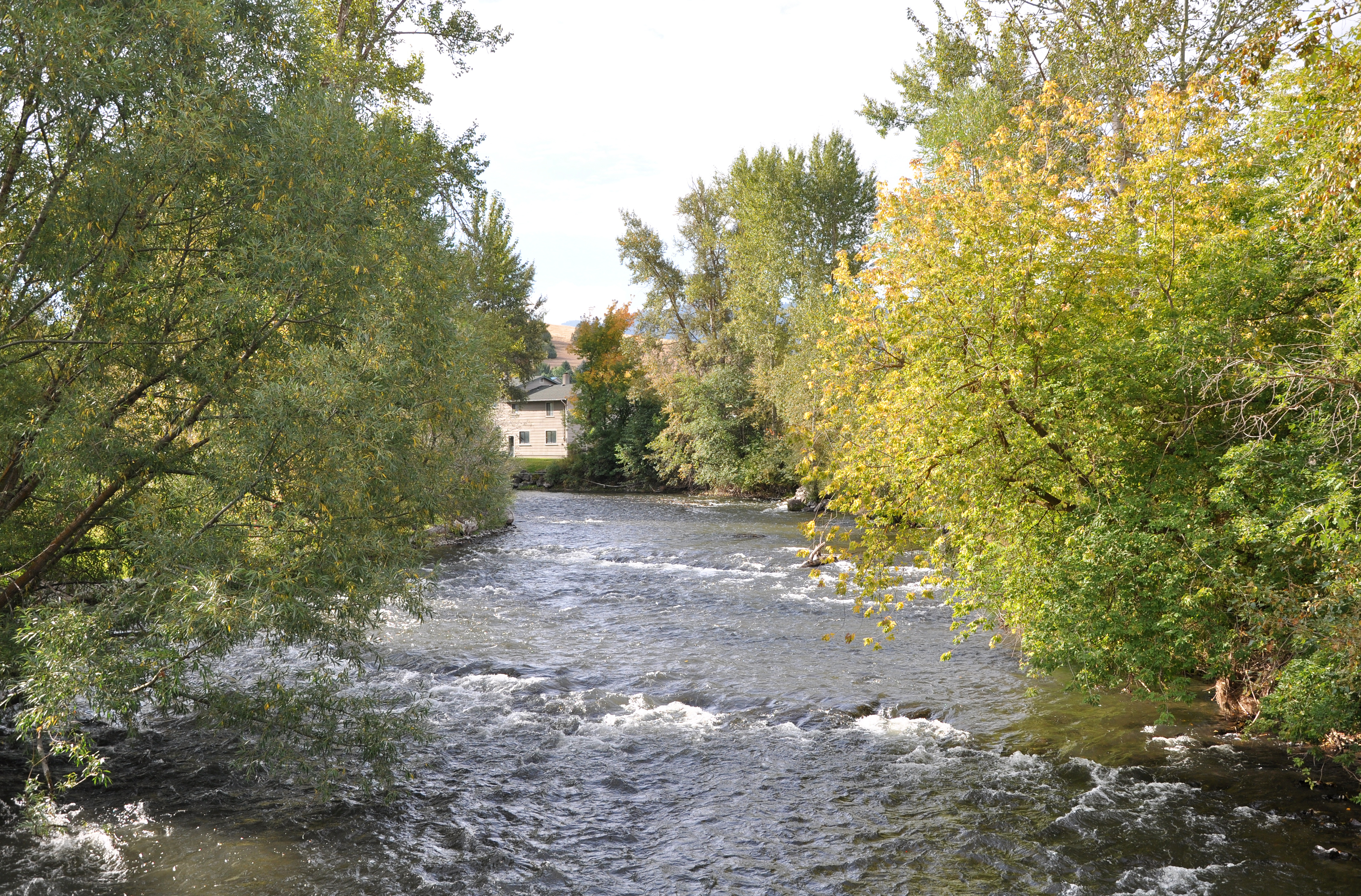
- Wallowa River at Wallowa, Oregon

- Location of the mouth of the Wallowa River in Oregon
- Etymology: A Nez Perce word for a triangle of stakes forming part of a fish trap.

Location
- Country: United States
- State: Oregon
- County: Wallowa and Union

Physical characteristics
- Source: Confluence of the east and west forks of the Wallowa River
  - location: about 1 mile (1.6 km) south of Wallowa Lake, Wallowa County, Oregon
  - coordinates: 45°16′28″N 117°12′42″W
  - elevation: 4,499 ft (1,371 m)
- Mouth: Grande Ronde River
  - location: Union County, Oregon
  - coordinates: 45°43′31″N 117°47′8″W
  - elevation: 2,316 ft (706 m)
- Length: 55 mi (89 km)
- Basin size: 950 sq mi (2,500 km^{2})
- Discharge
  - location: Wallowa
  - average: 610 cu ft/s (17 m^{3}/s)
  - minimum: 89 cu ft/s (2.5 m^{3}/s)
  - maximum: 4,640 cu ft/s (131 m^{3}/s)

Basin features
- Tributaries
  - left: Lostine River, Minam River

National Wild and Scenic River
- Type: Recreational
- Designated: July 23, 1996

The Wallowa River is a tributary of the Grande Ronde River, approximately 55 miles (89 km) long, in northeastern Oregon in the United States. It drains a valley on the Columbia Plateau in the northeast corner of the state north of Wallowa Mountains.

The Wallowa Valley was home to Chief Joseph's band of the Nez Perce Tribe. Chief Joseph asked the first white settlers to leave when they arrived in 1871. The U.S. government expelled the tribe and seized their property and livestock in 1877, when non-Indian farmers and ranchers wanted to settle the fertile Wallowa valley. The tribe was barred from returning to their homeland by the government after repeated petitions. The tribal members were shipped in unheated box cars to Indian Territory (now Oklahoma) to be placed in a prisoner-of-war camp, never to see their homes again.

== Course ==
The river begins at the confluence of its east and west forks, which rise in southern Wallowa County, in the Eagle Cap Wilderness of the Wallowa–Whitman National Forest. It flows generally northwest through the Wallowa Valley, parallel to the McCully Basin, which is east of the ridge formed by East Peak, Hidden Peak, and Aneroid Mountain. At this point, the West Fork of the Wallowa River drainage basin is connected to the North Fork of the Imnaha River by the Polaris Pass drainage divide.

It then flows past the communities of Joseph, Enterprise, and Wallowa. Further upstream, it receives the Minam River from the left at the hamlet of Minam. Continuing north another 10 miles (16 km), it joins the Grande Ronde along the Wallowa–Union County line about 10 miles (16 km) north-northeast of Elgin and about 81 miles (130 km) from the larger river's confluence with the Snake River.

== Fish ==
The Wallowa River supports populations of steelhead, spring Chinook salmon, and mountain whitefish among other species. Sockeye salmon were extirpated from the Wallowa River when a small dam was constructed at the outlet of Wallowa Lake in the headwaters of the river. The dam was constructed to raise the level of the lake to store water for irrigation.

== See also ==
- List of longest streams of Oregon
- List of rivers of Oregon
