= Wallowa County, Oregon =

County in Oregon, United States

- County
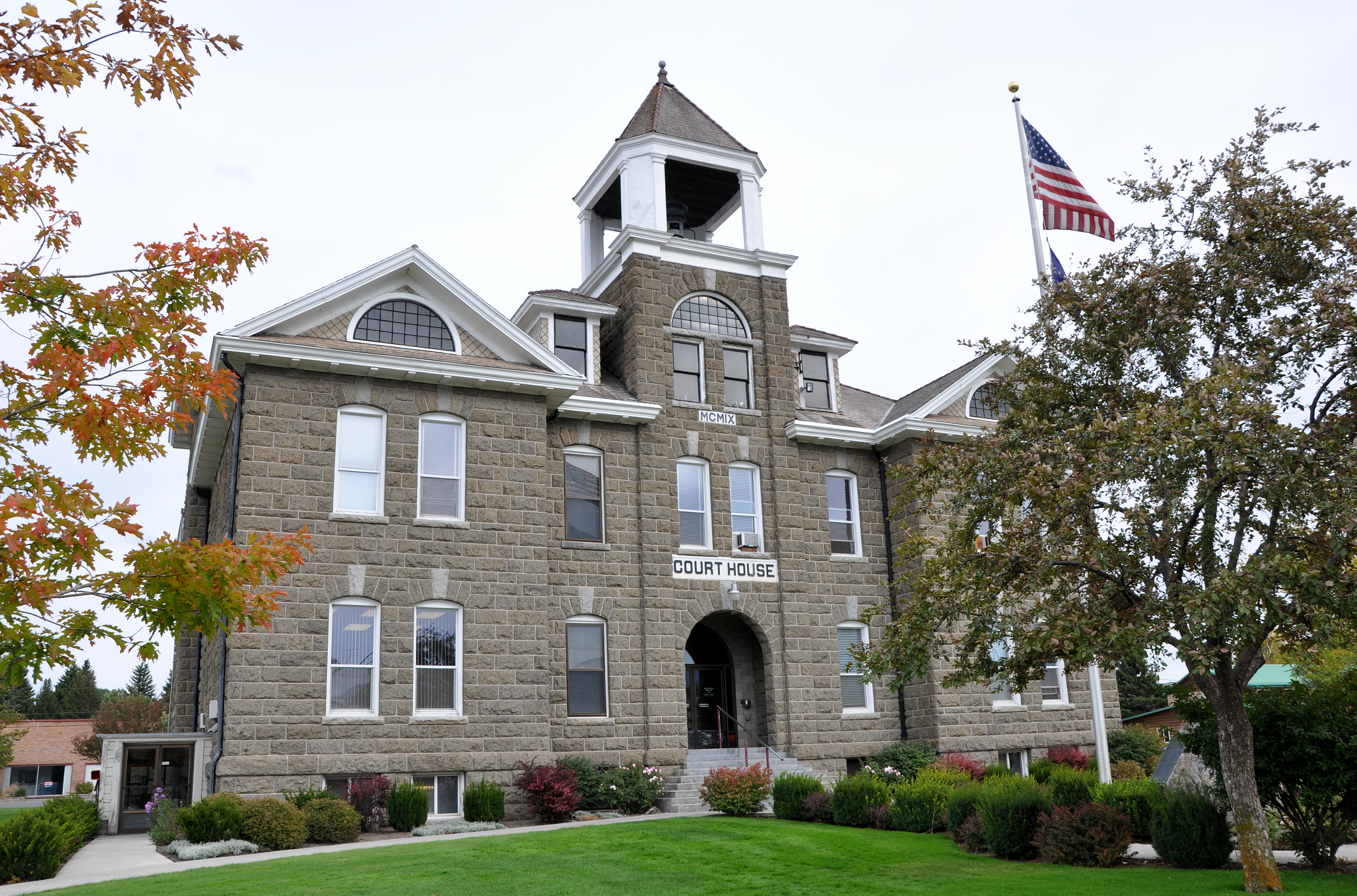
- Wallowa County Courthouse in Enterprise

- Location within the U.S. state of Oregon
- Coordinates: 45°35′N 117°10′W
- Country: United States
- State: Oregon
- Founded: October 14, 1887
- Named for: Wallowa River
- Seat: Enterprise
- Largest city: Enterprise

Area
  - Total: 3,152 sq mi (8,160 km^{2})
  - Land: 3,146 sq mi (8,150 km^{2})
  - Water: 5.5 sq mi (14 km^{2}) 0.2%

Population (2020)
  - Total: 7,391
  - Estimate (2025): 7,595 ▲
  - Density: 2.2/sq mi (0.85/km^{2})
- Time zone: UTC−8 (Pacific)
  - Summer (DST): UTC−7 (PDT)
- Congressional district: 2nd
- Website: co.wallowa.or.us

Wallowa County (/wəˈlaʊwə/) is the northeasternmost county in the U.S. state of Oregon. As of the 2020 census, its population was 7,391, making it Oregon's fifth-least populous county. Its county seat is Enterprise. According to Oregon Geographic Names, the origins of the county's name are uncertain, with the most likely explanation being it is derived from the Nez Perce term for a structure of stakes (a weir) used in fishing. An alternative explanation is that Wallowa is derived from a Nez Perce word for "winding water". The journals of Lewis and Clark Expedition record the name of the Wallowa River as Wil-le-wah.

Wallowa County is part of the eight-county definition of Eastern Oregon.

== History ==
In 1871, the first white settlers came to the area, crossing the mountains in search of livestock feed in the Wallowa Valley. The county was established on February 11, 1887, from the eastern portion of Union County. Boundary changes occurred with Union County in 1890, 1900, and 1915.

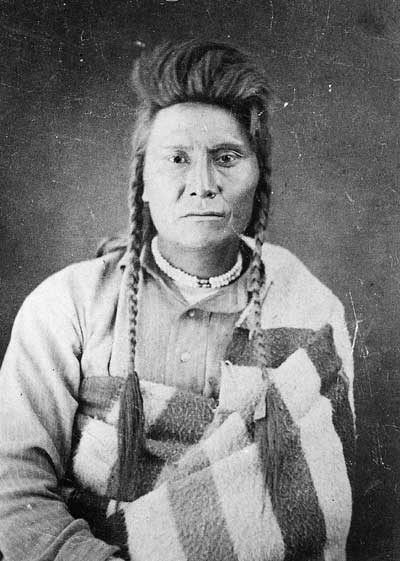
Chief Joseph, 1877

In 1877, the younger Chief Joseph of the Nez Perce, incensed at the government's attempt to remove his people from the Wallowa Valley, refused to relocate to the reservation in north-central Idaho. Several regiments of U.S. Army cavalry troops were dispatched to force them onto the reservation. After numerous battles and a journey of almost 2,000 mi (3,200 km), the Nez Perce fought their last battle at Bear Paw, just shy of the Canadian border, when Joseph and the other chiefs decided to stop fighting. Some of the surviving Nez Perce and he were held in prison camps in Kansas and Oklahoma, and those who survived that were relocated to Colville Reservation in northeast Washington. About half of the survivors moved to the Nez Perce Reservation in Idaho. Chief Joseph last visited Wallowa County in 1902, and died two years later.

Wallowa County was the scene of perhaps the worst incident of violence against Chinese in Oregon, when in May 1887, a gang of rustlers massacred 10-34 Chinese gold miners in Hells Canyon. Of the seven rustlers and schoolboys believed to have been responsible, only three were brought to trial in Enterprise, where a jury found them not guilty on September 1, 1888. A proposal to commemorate this event on official maps as Chinese Massacre Cove was approved in 2005 and encompasses a five-acre site.

In 1896, the Joseph town bank was robbed and a shootout took place in the streets. The town has occasionally had re-enactments of that event.

Wallowa County Courthouse was built in 1909–1910, using locally quarried Bowlby stone, a type of volcanic tuff. It is a Romanesque Revival-style building with Queen Anne architectural elements in some exterior features. The courthouse was listed on National Register of Historic Places in 2000. Today, it still houses Wallowa County government offices and faces west toward South River Street and is surrounded by Courthouse Square, which encompasses one city block, around 1.3 acres (1 ha). The square is landscaped with oak, pine, maple, linden, juniper, and flowering crabapple trees. Roses are planted on the north, west, and south sides of the courthouse. The square also has several veteran memorials along with a 20-by-24-foot (6.1 by 7.3 m) wood-framed gazebo in the northeast corner of the square.

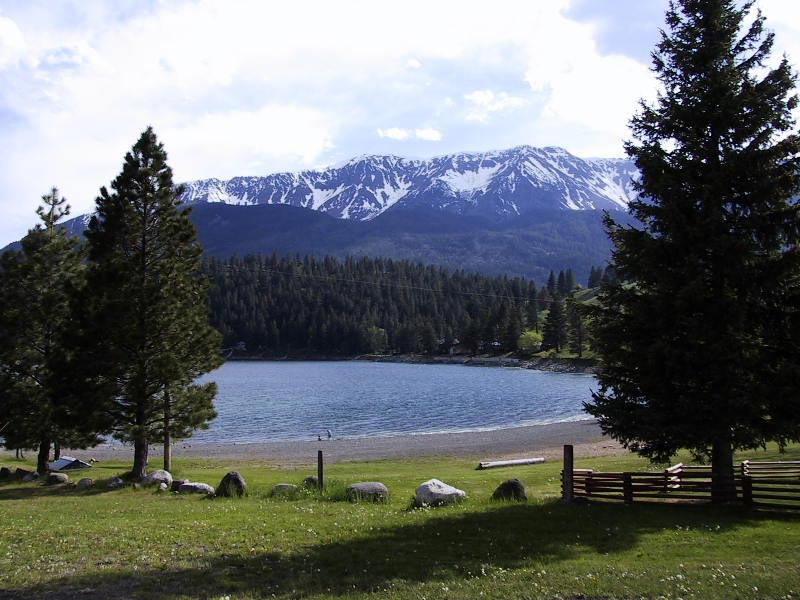
Wallowa mountains and lake

United States Supreme Court Associate Justice William O. Douglas was one famous summer visitor to Wallowa County, building a vacation cabin on Lostine River Road in 1939. The noted, award-winning character actor Walter A. Brennan was another famous part-time resident, with a ranch in the Imnaha River canyon complex and properties in Joseph.

In December 2003, a developer announced a proposal to buy a 62-acre (0.25 km^{2}) property near Wallowa Lake to build 11 homes on it. This property is adjacent to the property that is home to the grave of Old Chief Joseph, father of the younger Chief Joseph. This proposal drew opposition from a local group, as well as from the Nez Perce, Colville, and Umatilla tribes. Prior offers by the National Park Service and the Trust for Public Land to buy the land were rejected. The county commissioners gave conditional approval for the developers to complete a final plat of the land on February 13, 2004, but the attorney for the Nez Perce said the tribe would appeal the decision to the Oregon Land Use Board of Appeals. As of 2016, the controversy was still active.

== Geography ==
Map of Wallowa County

Wallowa is the northeasternmost county of Oregon. According to the United States Census Bureau, the county has a total area of 3,152 square miles (8,160 km^{2}), of which 5.5 sq mi (14 km^{2}) (0.2%) are covered by water.

=== Geographic features ===
Wallowa Lake and the Wallowa Mountains attract tourists to this region. The lake is a natural glacial formation, held in on three sides by prominent moraines. The microclimate is somewhat different from the surrounding areas and provides a cool retreat during the summer. Other geographic features include:

- Grande Ronde River
- Joseph Canyon
- Hells Canyon
- Wallowa River
- Imnaha River

=== Adjacent counties ===
- Columbia County, Washington - northwest
- Garfield County, Washington - north
- Asotin County, Washington - northeast
- Nez Perce County, Idaho - northeast
- Idaho County, Idaho - east/Mountain Time Border
- Adams County, Idaho - southeast/Mountain Time Border
- Baker County (south)
- Union County (southwest)
- Umatilla County (west)

=== National protected areas ===
- Nez Perce National Historical Park (part)
- Umatilla National Forest (part)
- Wallowa–Whitman National Forest (part)
- Hells Canyon National Recreation Area (part)

== Demographics ==
Historical population
Census	Pop.	Note	%±
1890	3,661		—
1900	5,538		51.3%
1910	8,364		51.0%
1920	9,778		16.9%
1930	7,814		−20.1%
1940	7,623		−2.4%
1950	7,264		−4.7%
1960	7,102		−2.2%
1970	6,247		−12.0%
1980	7,273		16.4%
1990	6,911		−5.0%
2000	7,226		4.6%
2010	7,008		−3.0%
2020	7,391		5.5%
2025 (est.)	7,595	▲	2.8%
U.S. Decennial Census; 1790–1960 1900–1990; 1990–2000 2010–2020

=== 2020 census ===
Wallowa County, Oregon – Racial and ethnic composition Note: the US Census treats Hispanic/Latino as an ethnic category. This table excludes Latinos from the racial categories and assigns them to a separate category. Hispanics/Latinos may be of any race.
Race / Ethnicity (NH = Non-Hispanic)	Pop 1980	Pop 1990	Pop 2000	Pop 2010	Pop 2020	% 1980	% 1990	% 2000	% 2010	% 2020
White alone (NH)	7,184	6,738	6,918	6,625	6,598	98.78%	97.50%	95.74%	94.53%	89.27%
Black or African American alone (NH)	5	6	2	26	9	0.07%	0.09%	0.03%	0.37%	0.12%
Native American or Alaska Native alone (NH)	24	31	48	38	50	0.33%	0.45%	0.66%	0.54%	0.68%
Asian alone (NH)	8	23	17	24	31	0.11%	0.33%	0.24%	0.34%	0.42%
Native Hawaiian or Pacific Islander alone (NH)	x	x	3	6	4	x	x	0.04%	0.09%	0.05%
Other race alone (NH)	5	0	10	7	54	0.07%	0.00%	0.14%	0.10%	0.73%
Multiracial (NH)	x	x	103	126	388	x	x	1.43%	1.80%	5.25%
Hispanic or Latino (any race)	47	113	125	156	257	0.65%	1.64%	1.73%	2.23%	3.48%
Total	7,273	6,911	7,226	7,008	7,391	100.00%	100.00%	100.00%	100.00%	100.00%

As of the 2020 census, the county had a population of 7,391. Of the residents, 18.6% were under 18 and 31.3% were 65 or older; the median age was 52.8 years. For every 100 females, there were 94.7 males, and for every 100 females 18 and over, there were 94.1 males.None of the residents lived in urban areas and 100.0% lived in rural areas.

The racial makeup of the county was 90.3% White, 0.1% Black or African American, 0.8% American Indian and Alaska Native, 0.4% Asian, 0.1% Native Hawaiian and Pacific Islander, 2.0% from some other race, and 6.3% from two or more races. Hispanic or Latino residents of any race comprised 3.5% of the population.

Of the 3,376 households in the county, 23.0% had children under 18 living with them, 24.2% had a female householder with no spouse or partner present, about 30.8% were made up of individuals, and 16.6% had someone living alone who was 65 or older.

The county had 4,326 housing units, of which 22.0% were vacant. Among occupied housing units, 73.4% were owner-occupied and 26.6% were renter-occupied. The homeowner vacancy rate was 1.0% and the rental vacancy rate was 3.3%.

=== 2010 census ===
As of the 2010 census, 7,008 people, 3,133 households, and 2,024 families resided in the county. The population density was 2.2 inhabitants per square mile (0.85/km^{2}). The 4,108 housing units had an average density of 1.3 units per square mile (0.50 units/km^{2}). The racial makeup of the county was 96.0% White, 0.6% American Indian, 0.4% Black or African American, 0.3% Asian, 0.1% Pacific Islander, 0.5% from other races, and 2.0% from two or more races. Hispanics or Latinos made up 2.2% of the population. In terms of ancestry, 28.4% were German, 16.7% were English, 14.6% were Irish, 7.3% were American, and 5.4% were Scotch-Irish.

Of the 3,133 households, 22.3% had children under 18 living with them, 54.3% were married couples living together, 7.1% had a female householder with no husband present, 35.4% were not families, and 30.0% were made up of individuals. The average household size was 2.20, and the average family size was 2.70. The median age was 50.5 years.

The median income in the county for a household was $41,116 and for a family was $49,961. Males had a median income of $35,963 versus $29,395 for females. The per capita income for the county was $23,023. About 9.6% of families and 12.9% of the population were below the poverty line, including 17.4% of those under 18 and 10.6% of those 65 or over.

=== 2000 census ===
As of the 2000 census, 7,226 people, 3,029 households, and 2,083 families were residing in the county. The population density was 2 people per square mile (0.77 people/km^{2}). The 3,900 housing units had an average density of 1 units per square mile (0.39/km^{2}). The racial makup of the county was 96.50% White, 0.03% Black or African American, 0.71% Native American, 0.24% Asian, 0.04% Pacific Islander, 0.95% from other races, and 1.54% from two or more races. About 1.73% were Hispanic or Latino of any race; 21.8% were of German, 15.7% American, 12.3% English, and 11.8% Irish ancestry.

Of the 3,029 households, 28.5% had children under 18 living with them, 58.7% were married couples living together, 6.9% had a female householder with no husband present, and 31.2% were not families. About 27.1% of households were one person and 11.9% were one person 65 or older. The average household size was 2.35, and the average family size was 2.85.

The age distribution was 24.30% under 18, 4.90% from 18 to 24, 21.90% from 25 to 44, 30.00% from 45 to 64, and 18.90% were 65 or older. The median age was 44 years. For every 100 females, there were 100.1 males. For every 100 females 18 and over, there were 96.1 males.

The median household income was $32,129 and the median family income was $38,682. Males had a median income of $28,202 versus $21,558 for females. The per capita income for the county was $17,276. About 9.80% of families and 14.00% of the population were below the poverty line, including 18.30% of those under 18 and 11.40% of those 65 or over.

== Communities ==
=== Incorporated cities ===
- Enterprise (county seat)
- Joseph
- Lostine
- Wallowa

=== Census-designated place ===
- Wallowa Lake

=== Unincorporated communities ===
- Bartlett
- Eden
- Evans
- Flora
- Fruita
- Grouse
- Imnaha
- Lewis
- Maxville
- Minam
- Paradise
- Promise
- Troy
- Zumwalt

== Politics ==
=== State legislature ===
Wallowa County is located in Oregon State House District 58 which is currently represented by Bobby Levy. It is also located in Oregon State Senate District 29, represented by Todd Nash, who is also Oregon's first state senator from Wallowa County. Both Levy and Nash are registered Republicans.

=== Board of commissioners ===
Wallowa County is represented and governed by three county commissioners. The Wallowa County Board of Commissioners is currently made up of Lisa Collier, Cody Lathrop, and John Hillock.

=== Make-up of voters ===
Like most counties in eastern Oregon, the majority of registered voters who are part of a political party in Wallowa County are members of the Republican Party. In the 2008 presidential election, 63.52% of Wallowa County voters voted for Republican John McCain, while 33.42% voted for Democrat Barack Obama and 3.06% of voters either voted for a third-party candidate or wrote in a candidate. These numbers have changed slightly from the 2004 presidential election, in which 69.3% voted for George W. Bush, while 28.1% voted for John Kerry, and 2.6% of voters either voted for a Third Party candidate or wrote in a candidate.

United States presidential election results for Wallowa County, Oregon
Year	Republican		Democratic		Third party(ies)	
Year	No.	%	No.	%	No.	%
1904	714	64.32%	255	22.97%	141	12.70%
1908	905	58.69%	506	32.81%	131	8.50%
1912	353	19.27%	610	33.30%	869	47.43%
1916	1,198	35.75%	1,960	58.49%	193	5.76%
1920	1,612	60.28%	896	33.51%	166	6.21%
1924	1,253	46.29%	973	35.94%	481	17.77%
1928	1,326	56.86%	935	40.09%	71	3.04%
1932	772	29.11%	1,790	67.50%	90	3.39%
1936	811	25.89%	2,000	63.86%	321	10.25%
1940	1,319	39.84%	1,974	59.62%	18	0.54%
1944	1,152	42.34%	1,544	56.74%	25	0.92%
1948	1,196	44.71%	1,408	52.64%	71	2.65%
1952	1,891	59.41%	1,271	39.93%	21	0.66%
1956	1,604	48.21%	1,723	51.79%	0	0.00%
1960	1,440	46.08%	1,682	53.82%	3	0.10%
1964	1,055	37.04%	1,790	62.85%	3	0.11%
1968	1,527	55.69%	1,006	36.69%	209	7.62%
1972	1,909	62.28%	899	29.33%	257	8.38%
1976	1,693	53.76%	1,310	41.60%	146	4.64%
1980	2,485	65.53%	995	26.24%	312	8.23%
1984	2,619	68.36%	1,204	31.43%	8	0.21%
1988	1,993	56.89%	1,425	40.68%	85	2.43%
1992	1,630	40.01%	1,203	29.53%	1,241	30.46%
1996	2,379	55.36%	1,321	30.74%	597	13.89%
2000	3,279	76.36%	836	19.47%	179	4.17%
2004	3,132	69.28%	1,269	28.07%	120	2.65%
2008	2,836	63.52%	1,492	33.42%	137	3.07%
2012	2,804	66.68%	1,253	29.80%	148	3.52%
2016	2,848	65.23%	1,116	25.56%	402	9.21%
2020	3,404	66.11%	1,625	31.56%	120	2.33%
2024	3,366	65.90%	1,573	30.79%	169	3.31%

== Economy ==
The principal industries in Wallowa County are agriculture, ranching, lumber, and tourism. Since 1985, three bronze foundries and a number of related businesses specializing in statue-making have opened in Joseph and Enterprise, helping to stabilize the local economy. The Forest Service is the largest landlord in the county, owning 56% of the land.

== Transportation ==
=== Major highways ===
- – Oregon Route 3 – north to Washington, becomes Route 129
- – Oregon Route 82 – west to La Grande, the junction with Interstate 84

=== Railroads ===
- Eagle Cap Excursion Train (part)

== Education ==
School districts:

- Enterprise School District 21
- Joseph School District 6
- Troy School District 54
- Wallowa School District 12

== Notable people ==
- Chief Joseph
- Old Chief Joseph
- Margaret Osborne duPont
- Walter Brennan
- Eugene Pallette
- Amos Marsh
- Frank Wayne Marsh

== See also ==
- National Register of Historic Places listings in Wallowa County, Oregon
