= Joseph, Oregon =

Joseph, Oregon hinmatóowyalahtq̓it (Nez Perce)
- City
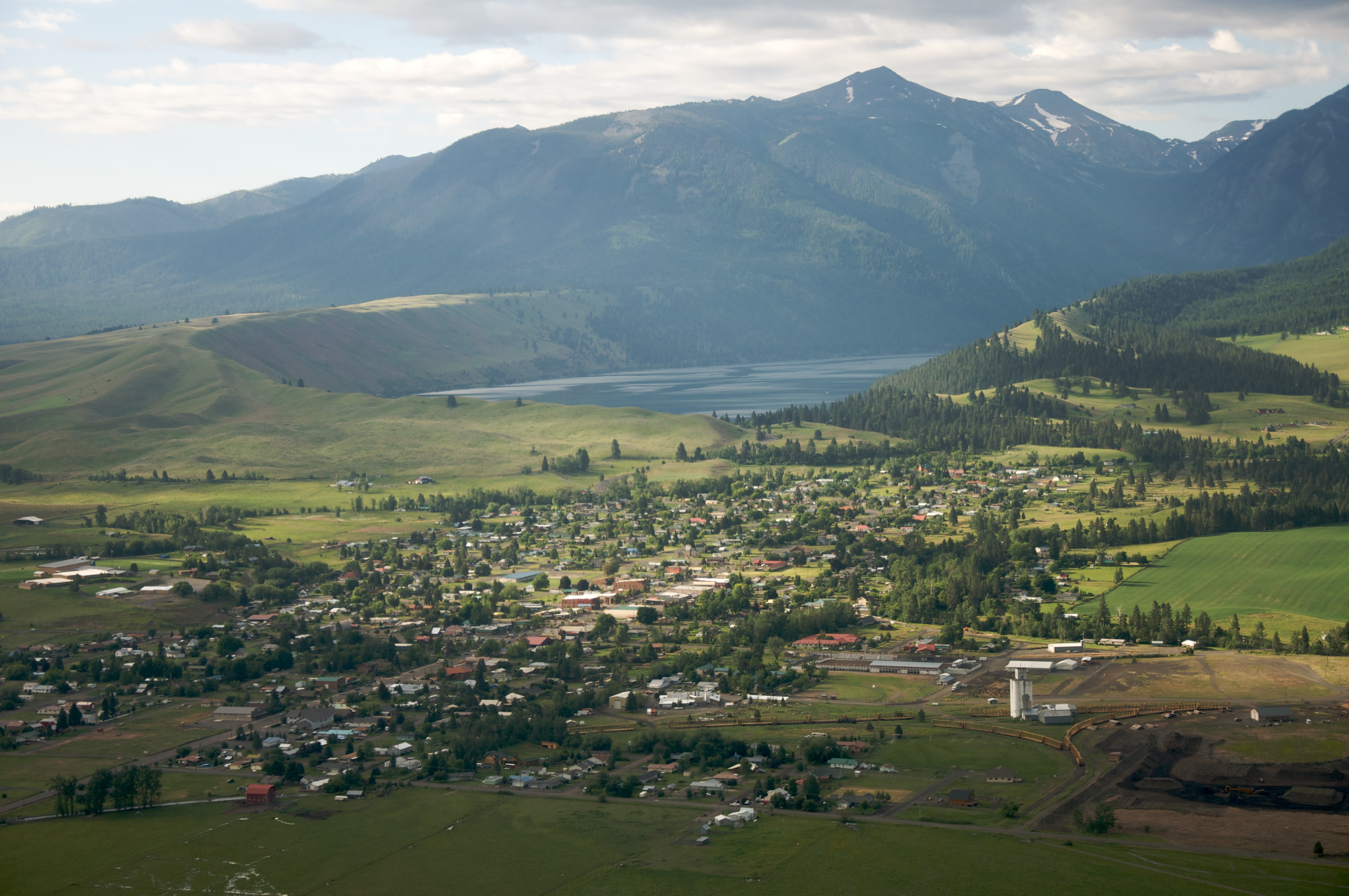
- Joseph in 2007

- Location in Oregon
- Coordinates: 45°21′09″N 117°13′49″W
- Country: United States
- State: Oregon
- County: Wallowa
- Incorporated: 1887
- Named for: Chief Joseph

Area
  - Total: 0.91 sq mi (2.35 km^{2})
  - Land: 0.91 sq mi (2.35 km^{2})
  - Water: 0 sq mi (0.00 km^{2})
- Elevation: 4,193 ft (1,278 m)

Population (2020)
  - Total: 1,154
  - Density: 1,273.0/sq mi (491.49/km^{2})
- Time zone: UTC−08:00 (Pacific)
  - Summer (DST): UTC−07:00 (Pacific)
- ZIP Code: 97846
- Area code: 541
- FIPS code: 41-37900
- GNIS feature ID: 2410150
- Website: www.josephoregon.org

Joseph is a city in Wallowa County, Oregon, United States. Originally named Silver Lake and Lake City, the city formally named itself in 1880 for Chief Joseph (1840–1904) of the Nez Perce people. As of the 2020 census, Joseph had a population of 1,154.

== History ==
Joseph was platted in 1883, and the economy was originally based on the land, especially grain and stock. In 1896 the First Bank of Joseph was robbed; one robber was shot and killed, another shot and captured, and a third escaped with the money. On occasion there have been reenactments of the robbery. After a railroad line was completed to Joseph in 1908, a lumber mill opened, bolstering the economy.

When the timber industry collapsed in the 1980s, local unemployment rate approached 17%. However, in 1982 a new industry was born as three bronze foundries opened in the local area.

The city sponsors the annual Chief Joseph Days Rodeo in late July, Bronze, Blues and Brews in August since 2001, and Alpenfest in September, a Swiss-Bavarian festival staged in Joseph and at nearby Wallowa Lake. Alpenfest resembles an Oktoberfest but has more yodeling and alphorn playing, reflecting the area's reputation as "Oregon's Little Switzerland."

== Geography ==
According to the United States Census Bureau, the city has a total area of 0.88 square miles (2.28 km^{2}), all of it land.

=== Climate ===
This climatic region is typified by large seasonal temperature differences, with warm to hot (and often humid) summers and cold (sometimes severely cold) winters. According to the Köppen Climate Classification system, Joseph has a humid continental climate, abbreviated "Dfb" on climate maps. The hottest temperature recorded in Joseph was 100 °F (37.8 °C) in July 1919, while the coldest temperature recorded was −34 °F (−36.7 °C) in December 1924.

Climate data for Joseph, Oregon, 1991–2020 normals, extremes 1893–2012
Month	Jan	Feb	Mar	Apr	May	Jun	Jul	Aug	Sep	Oct	Nov	Dec	Year
Record high °F (°C)	61 (16)	61 (16)	70 (21)	85 (29)	98 (37)	97 (36)	100 (38)	97 (36)	95 (35)	85 (29)	71 (22)	72 (22)	100 (38)
Mean maximum °F (°C)	49.4 (9.7)	50.5 (10.3)	60.8 (16.0)	71.6 (22.0)	79.8 (26.6)	85.7 (29.8)	92.7 (33.7)	91.1 (32.8)	85.8 (29.9)	75.3 (24.1)	59.9 (15.5)	51.5 (10.8)	93.1 (33.9)
Mean daily maximum °F (°C)	34.9 (1.6)	39.1 (3.9)	46.3 (7.9)	51.8 (11.0)	61.0 (16.1)	68.4 (20.2)	79.3 (26.3)	79.7 (26.5)	70.6 (21.4)	56.1 (13.4)	42.7 (5.9)	34.7 (1.5)	55.4 (13.0)
Daily mean °F (°C)	26.9 (−2.8)	29.2 (−1.6)	36.3 (2.4)	41.1 (5.1)	49.7 (9.8)	56.3 (13.5)	64.0 (17.8)	64.5 (18.1)	57.0 (13.9)	45.0 (7.2)	33.9 (1.1)	26.2 (−3.2)	44.2 (6.8)
Mean daily minimum °F (°C)	18.8 (−7.3)	19.3 (−7.1)	26.2 (−3.2)	30.4 (−0.9)	38.5 (3.6)	44.3 (6.8)	48.8 (9.3)	49.4 (9.7)	43.4 (6.3)	33.9 (1.1)	25.1 (−3.8)	17.7 (−7.9)	33.0 (0.6)
Mean minimum °F (°C)	−5.1 (−20.6)	0.6 (−17.4)	8.5 (−13.1)	17.8 (−7.9)	24.4 (−4.2)	30.5 (−0.8)	36.3 (2.4)	35.0 (1.7)	27.9 (−2.3)	20.5 (−6.4)	9.3 (−12.6)	0.4 (−17.6)	−10.6 (−23.7)
Record low °F (°C)	−29 (−34)	−25 (−32)	−13 (−25)	−3 (−19)	18 (−8)	22 (−6)	22 (−6)	28 (−2)	11 (−12)	5 (−15)	−17 (−27)	−34 (−37)	−34 (−37)
Average precipitation inches (mm)	1.26 (32)	1.06 (27)	1.43 (36)	1.92 (49)	2.61 (66)	1.91 (49)	0.85 (22)	0.70 (18)	1.12 (28)	1.39 (35)	1.39 (35)	1.29 (33)	16.93 (430)
Average snowfall inches (cm)	10.7 (27)	9.2 (23)	10.1 (26)	6.3 (16)	1.1 (2.8)	0.0 (0.0)	0.0 (0.0)	0.0 (0.0)	0.1 (0.25)	1.2 (3.0)	7.3 (19)	8.2 (21)	54.2 (138.05)
Average precipitation days (≥ 0.01 in)	12.0	10.5	13.4	13.7	13.8	11.2	4.9	4.8	6.5	11.1	11.8	13.8	127.5
Average snowy days (≥ 0.1 in)	7.9	6.4	7.7	4.1	0.7	0.0	0.0	0.0	0.1	0.9	4.3	9.0	41.1
Source 1: NOAA
Source 2: National Weather Service (mean maxima and minima 1893-2012)

== Demographics ==
Historical population
Census	Pop.	Note	%±
1890	249		—
1900	237		−4.8%
1910	725		205.9%
1920	770		6.2%
1930	504		−34.5%
1940	593		17.7%
1950	666		12.3%
1960	788		18.3%
1970	839		6.5%
1980	999		19.1%
1990	1,073		7.4%
2000	1,055		−1.7%
2010	1,081		2.5%
2020	1,154		6.8%
U.S. Decennial Census

=== 2020 census ===
As of the 2020 census, Joseph had a population of 1,154; the median age was 55.9 years, 15.5% of residents were under the age of 18, and 34.6% were 65 years of age or older. For every 100 females there were 86.4 males, and for every 100 females age 18 and over there were 85.4 males age 18 and over.

0% of residents lived in urban areas, while 100.0% lived in rural areas.

There were 546 households in Joseph, of which 21.4% had children under the age of 18 living in them. Of all households, 44.7% were married-couple households, 17.8% were households with a male householder and no spouse or partner present, and 29.5% were households with a female householder and no spouse or partner present. About 32.4% of all households were made up of individuals and 19.0% had someone living alone who was 65 years of age or older.

There were 612 housing units, of which 10.8% were vacant. Among occupied housing units, 71.6% were owner-occupied and 28.4% were renter-occupied. The homeowner vacancy rate was 0.8% and the rental vacancy rate was 4.3%.

Racial composition as of the 2020 census
Race	Number	Percent
White	1,042	90.3%
Black or African American	1	0.1%
American Indian and Alaska Native	12	1.0%
Asian	7	0.6%
Native Hawaiian and Other Pacific Islander	0	0%
Some other race	24	2.1%
Two or more races	68	5.9%
Hispanic or Latino (of any race)	41	3.6%

=== 2010 census ===
As of the census of 2010, there were 1,081 people, 509 households, and 305 families living in the city. The population density was 1,228.4 inhabitants per square mile (474.3/km^{2}). There were 590 housing units at an average density of 670.5 per square mile (258.9/km^{2}). The racial makeup of the city was 94.7% White, 0.7% African American, 0.9% Native American, 0.4% Asian, 0.5% Pacific Islander, 0.7% from other races, and 2.0% from two or more races. Hispanic or Latino of any race were 2.0% of the population.

There were 509 households, of which 22.0% had children under the age of 18 living with them, 46.6% were married couples living together, 9.4% had a female householder with no husband present, 3.9% had a male householder with no wife present, and 40.1% were non-families. 34.6% of all households were made up of individuals, and 13.3% had someone living alone who was 65 years of age or older. The average household size was 2.06 and the average family size was 2.57.

The median age in the city was 51 years. 17% of residents were under the age of 18; 6.6% were between the ages of 18 and 24; 18.2% were from 25 to 44; 36.1% were from 45 to 64; and 22.2% were 65 years of age or older. The gender makeup of the city was 47.9% male and 52.1% female.

=== 2000 census ===
As of the census of 2000, there were 1,054 people, 450 households, and 288 families living in the city. The population density was 1,234.8 inhabitants per square mile (476.8/km^{2}). There were 543 housing units at an average density of 636.2 per square mile (245.6/km^{2}). The racial makeup of the city was 94.88% White, 0.47% Native American, 0.19% Asian, 0.09% Pacific Islander, 1.42% from other races, and 2.94% from two or more races. Hispanic or Latino of any race were 1.23% of the population.

There were 450 households, out of which 28.9% had children under the age of 18 living with them, 49.6% were married couples living together, 10.2% had a female householder with no husband present, and 35.8% were non-families. 31.6% of all households were made up of individuals, and 14.0% had someone living alone who was 65 years of age or older. The average household size was 2.26 and the average family size was 2.84.

In the city, the population dispersal was 24.2% under the age of 18, 5.4% from 18 to 24, 22.4% from 25 to 44, 27.0% from 45 to 64, and 21.0% who were 65 years of age or older. The median age was 43 years. For every 100 females, there were 98.5 males. For every 100 females age 18 and over, there were 91.1 males.

The median income for a household in the city was $31,310, and the median income for a family was $36,250. Males had a median income of $25,938 versus $21,563 for females. The per capita income for the city was $16,163. About 7.9% of families and 12.2% of the population were below the poverty line, including 9.8% of those under age 18 and 13.0% of those age 65 or over.

== Transportation ==
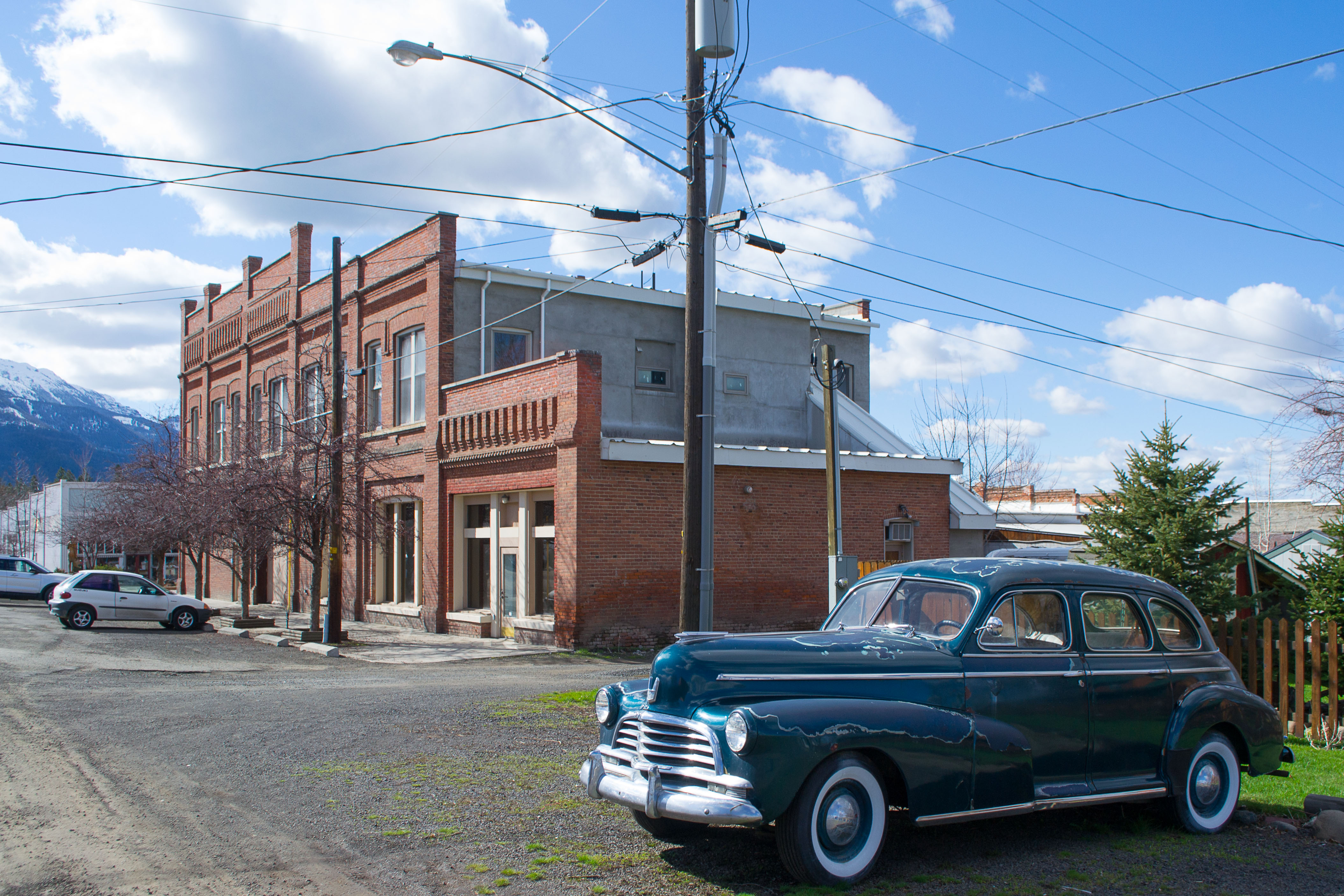
East First Street in 2013

- Joseph State Airport
- Wallowa Lake Tramway

== Education ==
It is in the Joseph School District 6.

== Notable people ==
- Chief Joseph
- Old Chief Joseph
- Rod Scribner
- Walter Brennan
- Margaret Osborne duPont
- Joseph, a band started by Natalie, Allison, and Meegan Closner, named after the town.
