= National Register of Historic Places listings in Wallowa County, Oregon =

Location of Wallowa County in Oregon

This list presents the full set of buildings, structures, objects, sites, or districts designated on the National Register of Historic Places in Wallowa County, Oregon, United States, and offers brief descriptive information about each of them. The National Register recognizes places of national, state, or local historic significance across the United States. Out of over 90,000 National Register sites nationwide, Oregon is home to over 2,000, and 23 of those are found in Wallowa County.

This National Park Service list is complete through NPS recent listings posted November 13, 2026.

== Current listings ==
	Name on the Register	Image	Date listed	Location	City or town	Description
1	Dr. J. W. Barnard Building and First National Bank of Joseph	Dr. J. W. Barnard Building and First National Bank of Joseph	June 19, 1991 (#91000810)	012–014 Main St. 45°21′07″N 117°13′41″W	Joseph	
2	Billy Meadows Guard Station	Billy Meadows Guard Station	March 6, 1991 (#91000161)	Northeast of the summit of Red Hill in the Wallowa–Whitman National Forest; 45°49′46″N 117°02′36″W	Joseph vicinity	
3	Burnaugh Building	Burnaugh Building	May 27, 1993 (#93000434)	107 N. River St. 45°25′33″N 117°16′39″W	Enterprise	
4	College Creek Ranger Station	College Creek Ranger Station	March 6, 1991 (#91000171)	Along the Imnaha River in the Wallowa–Whitman National Forest; 45°26′02″N 116°47′08″W	Imnaha	
5	Enterprise IOOF Hall	Enterprise IOOF Hall	March 7, 2012 (#12000083)	105 NE 1st Street; 45°25′34″N 117°16′33″W	Enterprise	Downtown Enterprise Multiple Property Submission
6	Enterprise Mercantile and Milling Company Building	Enterprise Mercantile and Milling Company Building	March 7, 2012 (#12000084)	115 E Main Street; 45°25′33″N 117°16′42″W	Enterprise	Downtown Enterprise Multiple Property Submission
7	Enterprise Public Library	Enterprise Public Library	September 30, 2013 (#13000806)	101 NE 1st Street; 45°25′33″N 117°16′34″W	Enterprise	
8	First Bank of Joseph	First Bank of Joseph	February 23, 1978 (#78002324)	2nd and Main Sts. 45°21′03″N 117°13′43″W	Joseph	
9	Flora School	Flora School	June 13, 1997 (#97000579)	82744 Church St. 45°24′52″N 117°18′25″W	Flora	
10	Gotter Hotel	Gotter Hotel	January 21, 1994 (#93001499)	301 W. Main St. 45°25′33″N 117°16′46″W	Enterprise	
11	Hells Canyon Archeological District	Hells Canyon Archeological District	August 10, 1984 (#84000984)	Address restricted	Imnaha	Also extends into Adams, Idaho, and Nez Perce counties, Idaho
12	Hoodoo Ridge Lookout	Hoodoo Ridge Lookout	May 26, 2015 (#15000273)	Umatilla National Forest, Walla Walla Ranger District; 45°56′52″N 117°36′40″W	Troy vicinity	
13	Hunter–Morelock House	Hunter–Morelock House	February 28, 1985 (#85000373)	104 Holmes St. 45°34′10″N 117°31′33″W	Wallowa	
14	Kirkland Lookout Ground House (Guard Station)	Kirkland Lookout Ground House (Guard Station)	March 6, 1991 (#91000165)	East of Joseph Creek in the Wallowa–Whitman National Forest; 45°50′15″N 117°07′59″W	Joseph	
15	Lick Creek Guard Station	Lick Creek Guard Station	April 8, 1986 (#86000844)	Wallowa–Whitman National Forest; 45°09′48″N 117°01′56″W	Enterprise	
16	Lostine Pharmacy	Lostine Pharmacy	November 24, 2014 (#14000961)	125 Highway 82; 45°29′18″N 117°25′57″W	Lostine	
17	Maxville	Maxville	February 29, 2024 (#100009999)	Address Restricted	Wallowa	
18	Nez Perce Traditional Site, Wallowa Lake	Nez Perce Traditional Site, Wallowa Lake	October 15, 1966 (#89001082)	Oregon Route 82 south of Joseph; 45°20′11″N 117°13′20″W	Joseph	The religious and cultural values associated with this traditional Nez Perce campground have persisted for over a century since Chief Joseph the Younger and his band of nontreaty Nez Perce were driven out. It provides a view of high, glaciated lake and mountain country, and includes the final resting place of Chief Joseph the Elder. It is a unit within the Nez Perce National Historical Park.
19	O.K. Theatre	O.K. Theatre	March 7, 2012 (#12000085)	208 W Main Street; 45°25′31″N 117°16′46″W	Enterprise	Downtown Enterprise Multiple Property Submission
20	Wallowa County Chieftain Building	Wallowa County Chieftain Building	November 21, 2012 (#12000964)	106 NW 1st Street; 45°25′34″N 117°16′45″W	Enterprise	
21	Wallowa County Courthouse	Wallowa County Courthouse	July 14, 2000 (#00000805)	101 S. River St. 45°25′31″N 117°16′33″W	Enterprise	
22	Wallowa Ranger Station	Wallowa Ranger Station	October 28, 2009 (#09000865)	602 W. 1st St. 45°34′13″N 117°32′09″W	Wallowa	
23	William P. Warnock House	William P. Warnock House	November 15, 1984 (#84000486)	501 S. 5th St. 45°25′16″N 117°16′08″W	Enterprise	

== See also ==
- National Register of Historic Places listings in Oregon
- Listings in neighboring counties: Adams, Asotin, Baker, Columbia, Garfield, Idaho, Nez Perce, Umatilla, Union
- List of National Historic Landmarks in Oregon
- Historic preservation
- History of Oregon
- Lists of Oregon-related topics
