= Burnaugh Building =

- U.S. National Register of Historic Places
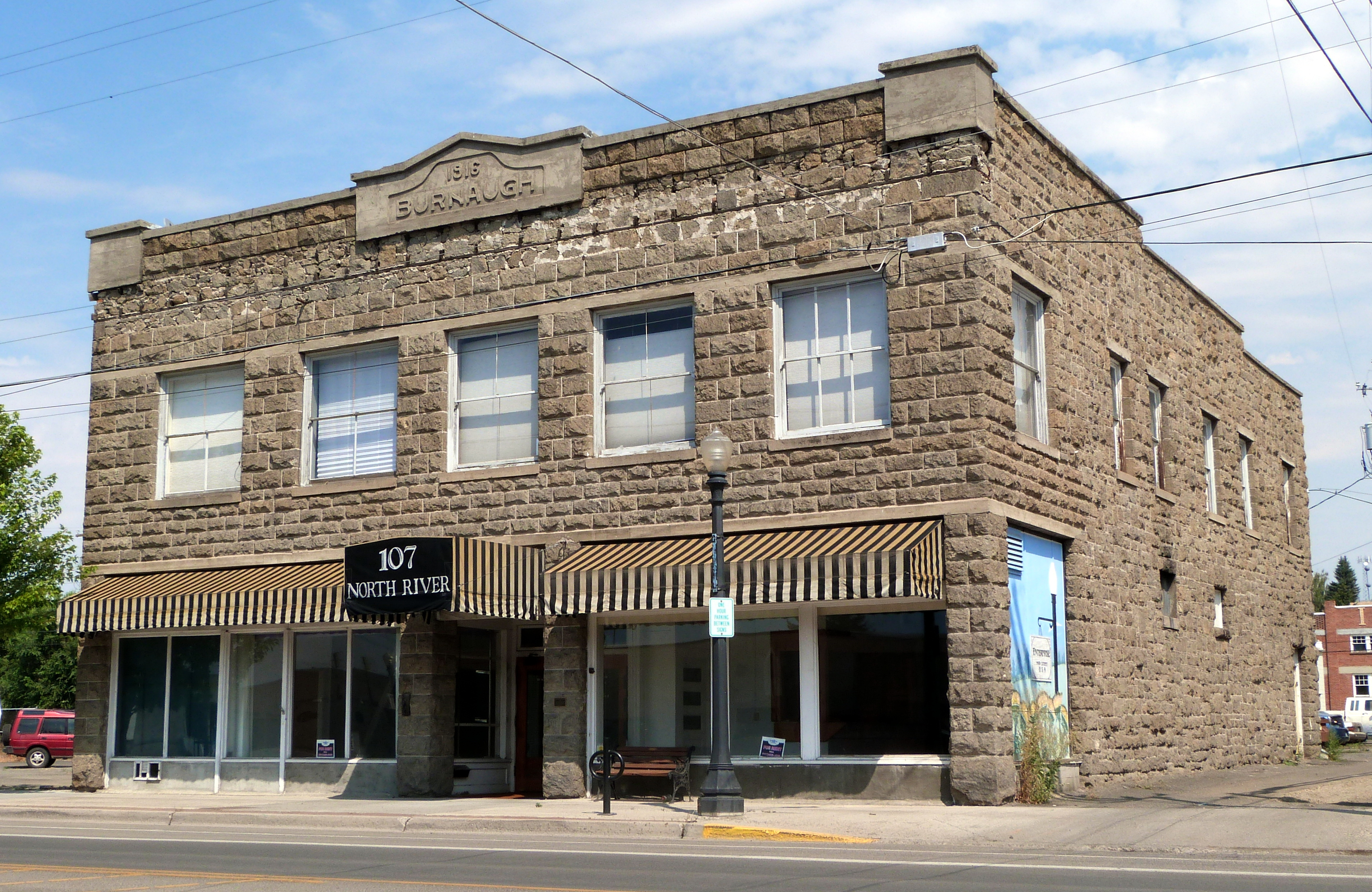
- The Burnaugh Building in 2014

- Location within Oregon Location within the United States
- Location: 107 N. River Street; Enterprise, Oregon
- Coordinates: 45°25′33.86″N 117°16′38.39″W
- Area: 0.2 acres (0.081 ha)
- Built: 1916-17
- Built by: Haworth, S.R.
- Architectural style: Early Commercial
- NRHP reference No.: 93000434
- Added to NRHP: May 27, 1993

The Burnaugh Building, at 107 N. River St. in Enterprise, Oregon, was built during 1916–17 in Early Commercial style. It was commissioned by S. L. Burnaugh for renting; Burnaugh served as mayor of Enterprise in the year following its construction. It has served as a post office, a meeting hall, as a businessplace, and as a multiple dwelling. It was listed on the National Register of Historic Places in 1993.

It is one of six buildings in Enterprise that was built of "Bowlby stone", a local tuffaceous rock; the Wallowa County Courthouse and the Record-Chieftain's plant building are the only other two surviving of the six.

== See also ==
- National Register of Historic Places listings in Wallowa County, Oregon
