= KWVR =

KWVR may refer to:

- KWVR (AM), a radio station (1340 AM) licensed to Enterprise, Oregon, United States
- KWVR-FM, a radio station (92.1 FM) licensed to Enterprise, Oregon, United States
- Keighley & Worth Valley Railway, a heritage railway line in West Yorkshire, England
