= Billy Meadows Guard Station =

- U.S. National Register of Historic Places
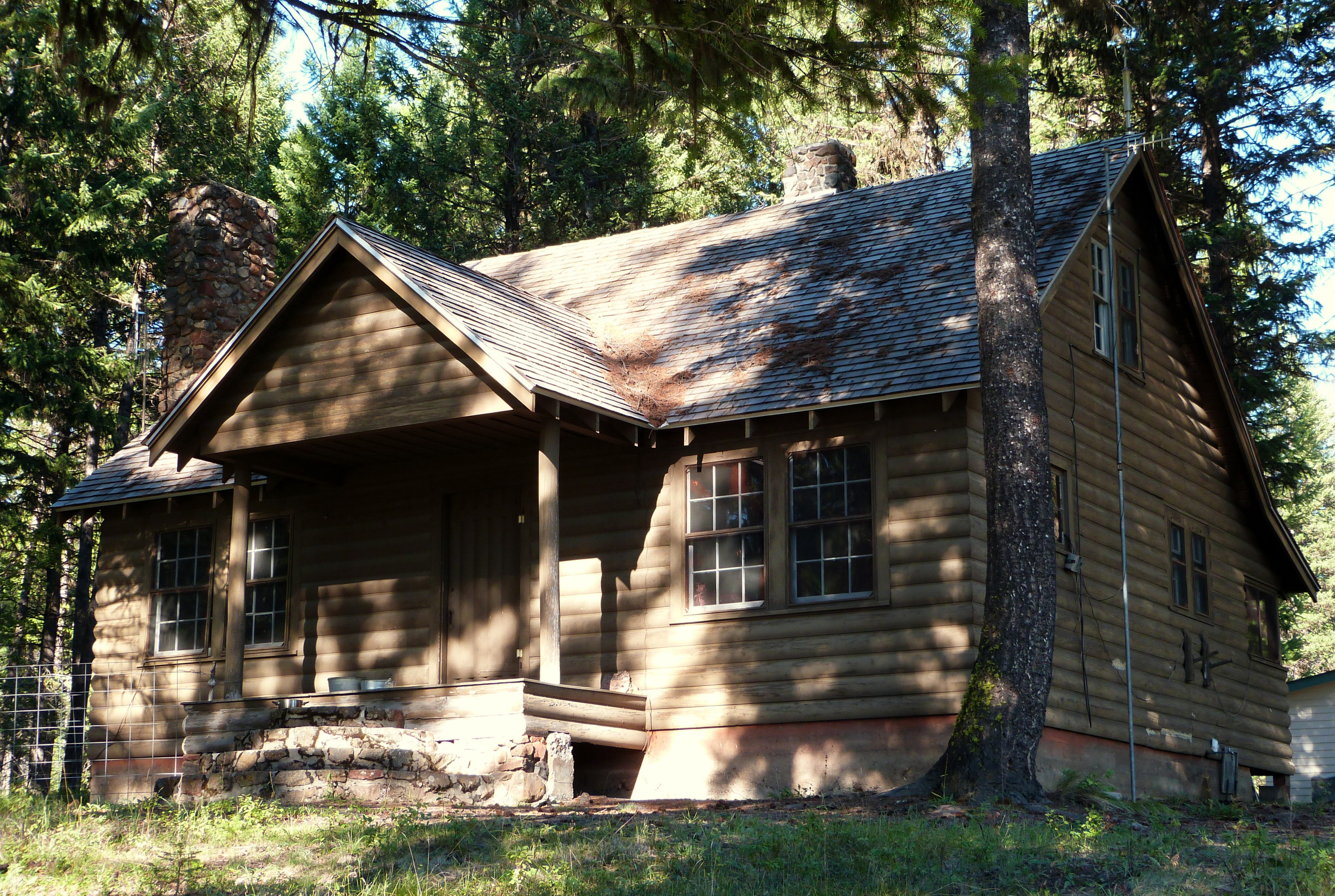
- The Billy Meadows Guard Station residence in 2013.

- Location within Oregon Location within the United States
- Nearest city: Joseph, Oregon
- Coordinates: 45°49′46″N 117°02′36″W
- Area: 2.8 acres (1.1 ha)
- Built: 1937
- Architect: Multiple
- Architectural style: Rustic
- MPS: USDA Forest Service Administrative Buildings in Oregon and Washington Built by the CCC MPS
- NRHP reference No.: 91000161
- Added to NRHP: March 6, 1991

The Billy Meadows Guard Station is a Forest Service Guard Station located in the Wallowa–Whitman National Forest near Joseph, Oregon, USA. In addition to the main residence, the station also includes a garage, warehouse, barn, and oil and gas house. The residence has a rustic design; the exterior walls use shiplap to resemble a log cabin, and the gabled front porch is supported by two logs. The original gable roof was wood shingled to fit the rustic theme but has since been replaced with sheet metal. The Civilian Conservation Corps built the guard station during the Great Depression.

The Billy Meadows Guard Station was added to the National Register of Historic Places on March 6, 1991.

== See also ==
- National Register of Historic Places listings in Wallowa County, Oregon
- Media related to Billy Meadows Guard Station at Wikimedia Commons
