= Lick Creek Guard Station =

- U.S. National Register of Historic Places
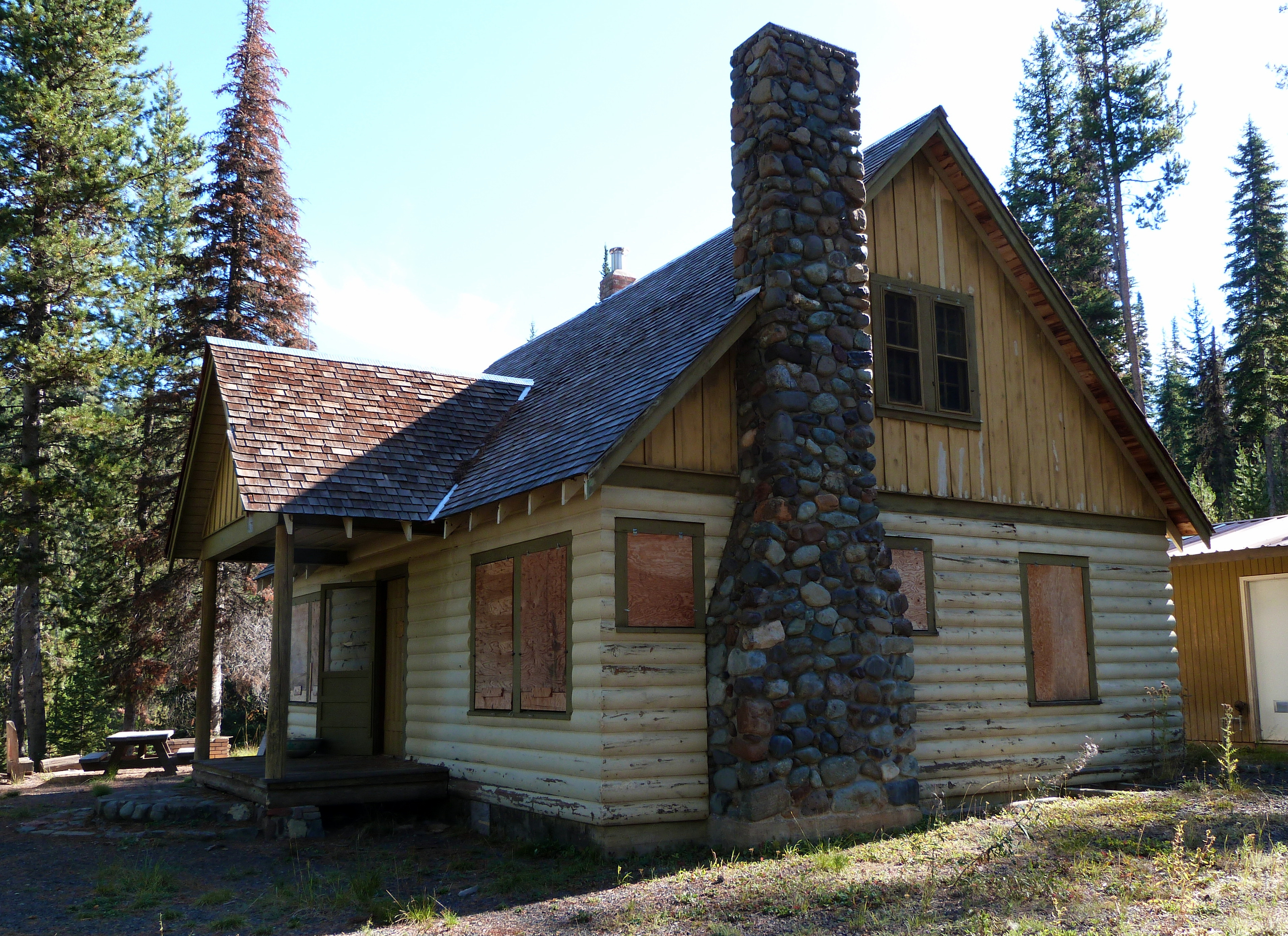
- The forest guard's residence at the Lick Creek Guard Station in 2103.

- Location within Oregon Location within the United States
- Location: Wallowa-Whitman National Forest, Enterprise, Oregon
- Coordinates: 45°09′48″N 117°01′56″W
- Area: 12.5 acres (5.1 ha)
- Built by: Civilian Conservation Corps
- Architect: USDA Forest Service Architecture Group
- Architectural style: Rustic
- MPS: Depression-Era Buildings TR
- NRHP reference No.: 86000844
- Added to NRHP: April 8, 1986

The Lick Creek Guard Station is a Forest Service Guard Station located in the Wallowa–Whitman National Forest near Enterprise, Oregon. The station was constructed by the Civilian Conservation Corps during the Great Depression. The wooden building was built in a rustic style; its walls were constructed with shiplap, and its gable roof has wood shingles. The building's design also includes a gabled porch, a stone interior chimney, and double-hung sash windows.

The Lick Creek Guard Station was added to the National Register of Historic Places on April 8, 1986.
