= Enterprise Public Library =

Historic library in Oregon, USA

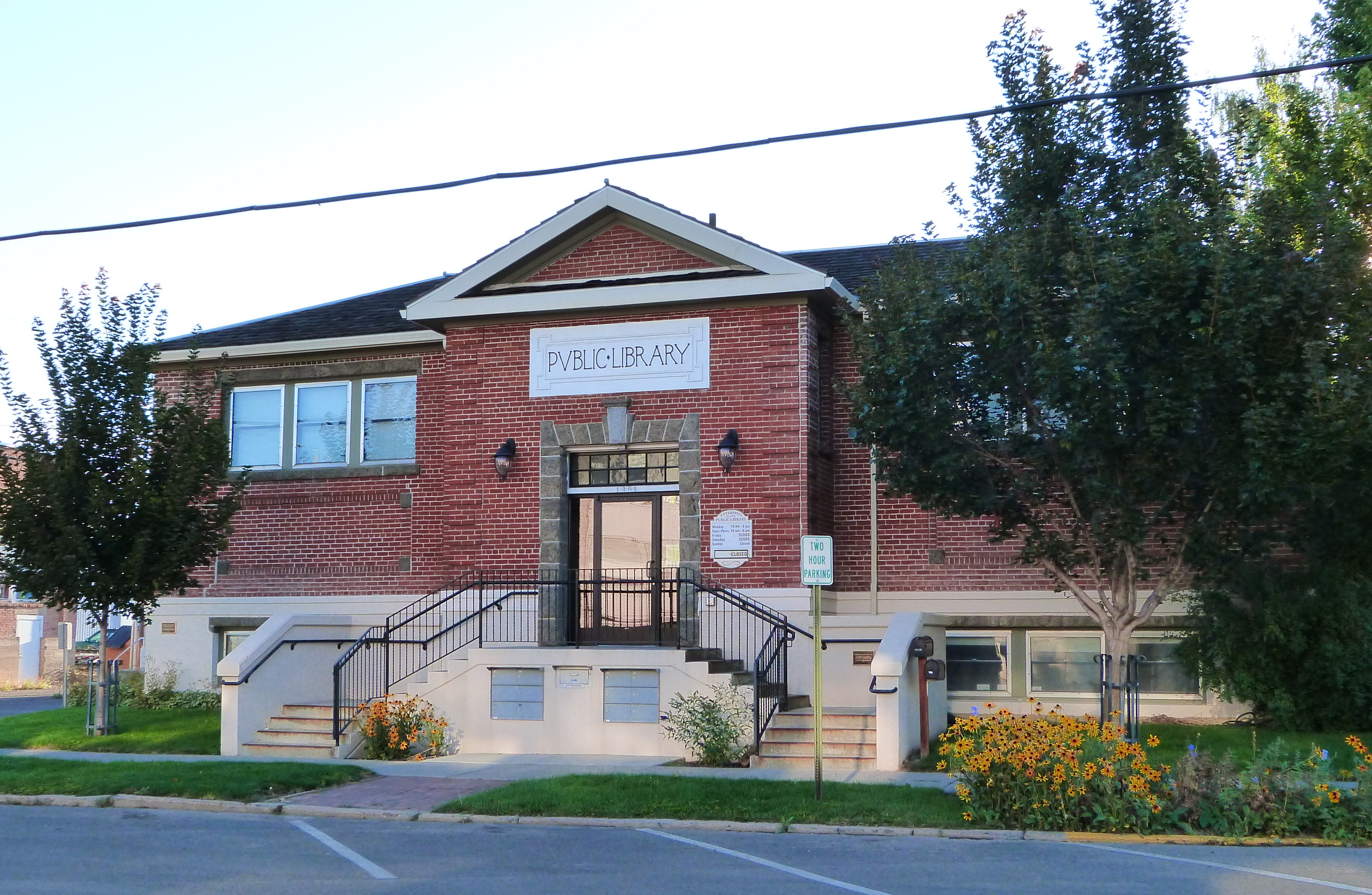
The library in 2013

The Enterprise Public Library, located in Enterprise, Oregon, was constructed with a $5,000 grant from the Carnegie Corporation and completed in 1914. After being nominated by Oregon's State Advisory Committee on Historic Preservation in June 2013, it was added to the National Register of Historic Places.

== See also ==
- National Register of Historic Places listings in Wallowa County, Oregon
