= Wallowa County Chieftain Building =

- U.S. National Register of Historic Places
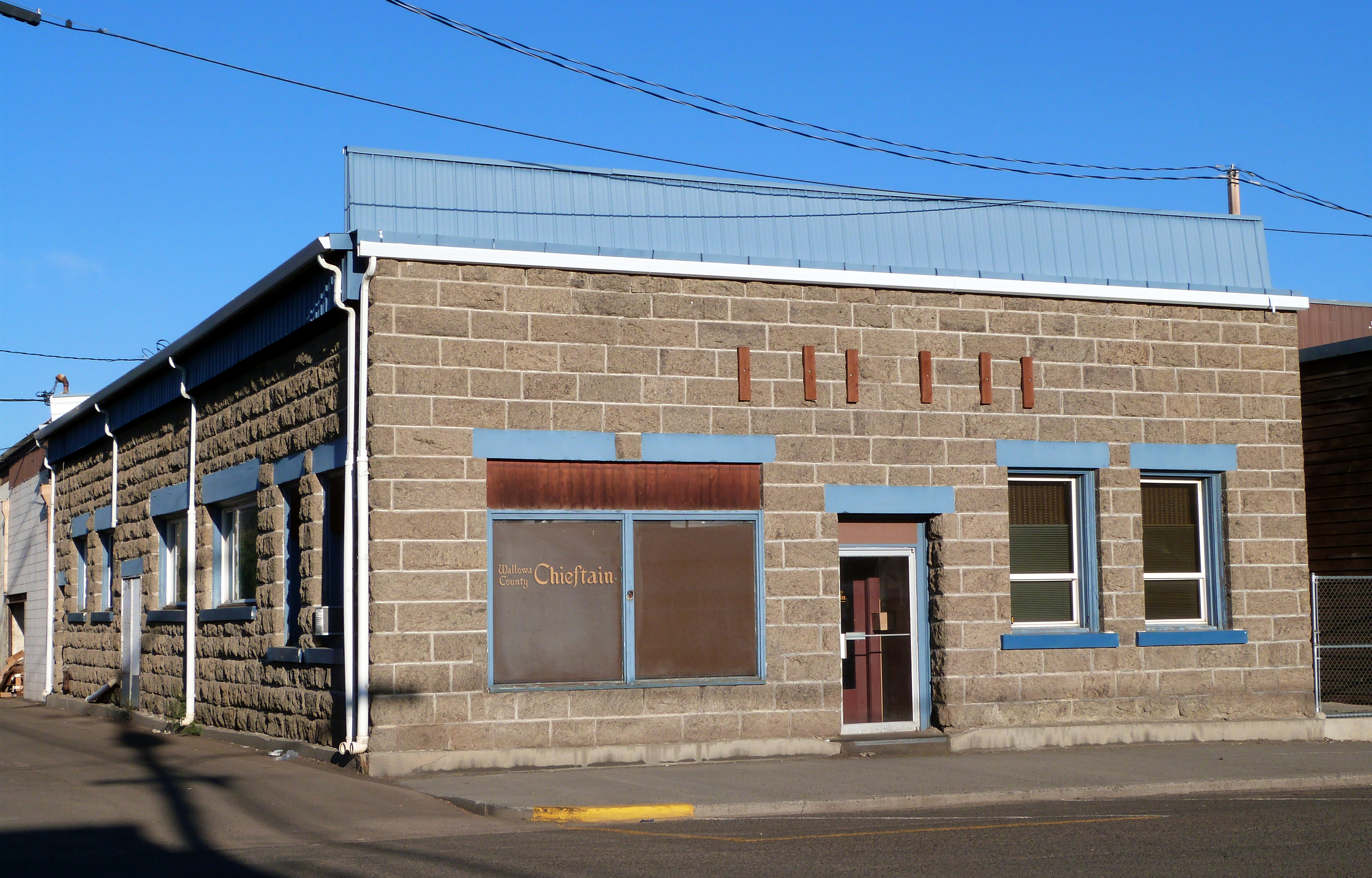
- The Wallowa County Chieftain Building in 2013.
- Location: 106 NW 1st Street, Enterprise, Oregon
- Coordinates: 45°25′34″N 117°16′45″W
- Built: 1915 or 1916
- NRHP reference No.: 12000964
- Added to NRHP: November 21, 2012

The Wallowa County Chieftain Building in Enterprise, Oregon is a historic building of the Wallowa County Chieftain newspaper, which has run since 1884 and has served the county with general news and, at times, with controversy, that was listed on the National Register of Historic Places in 2012.=

It is one of a few surviving historic buildings in Enterprise constructed of local "Bowlby stone"; others are the NRHP-listed Wallowa County Courthouse and the Burnaugh Building.; This building was built for the newspaper in 1915 or 1916 the newspaper itself has moved on to a new location at 209 N. 1st St. in Enterprise.
