= Gotter =

Gotter is a surname. Notable people with the surname include:

- Friedrich Wilhelm Gotter (1746–1797), German poet and dramatist
- Pauline Gotter (1786–1854), wife of Friedrich Wilhelm Gotter

== See also ==
- Gotter Hotel, historic building in Enterprise, Oregon, United States
