= OK Theatre =

- U.S. National Register of Historic Places
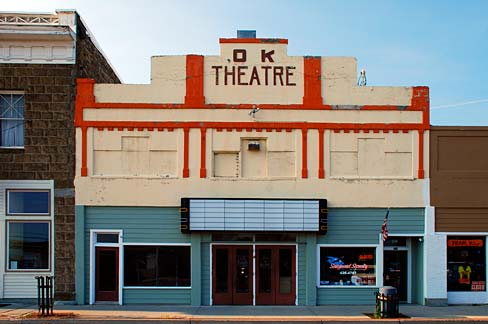
- Photo in 2009

- Location within Oregon Location within the United States
- Location: 208 W Main Street, Enterprise, Oregon
- Coordinates: 45°25′31″N 117°16′46″W
- Built: 1918
- Built by: John Oberg and Samuel Haworth
- MPS: Downtown Enterprise Multiple Property Submission
- NRHP reference No.: 12000085
- Added to NRHP: March 7, 2012

The OK Theatre, at 208 W. Main Street in Enterprise, Oregon, is a historic building that was listed on the National Register of Historic Places in 2012.

It was built in 1918 and featured—new for its area and time—a sloped seating section so that theatre-goers would have unobstructed views.

It was renamed to the Vista Theater in about 1933. It was bought in 2001 by new owners who restored its original name, and who operated it until 2008. After 90 years of operation the OK Theatre was closed in 2008, leaving Wallowa County, Oregon without a single open theatre. The building was offered for sale, together with two businesses and apartment rentals, for $240,000 Part-time locals Bill and Melisa Bush, along with their son Gabriel bought The OK in 2009. During their four years with this institution, they brought back up to date movies, foreign and art movie nights, special needs movie screenings, theatre productions, charity events, high school events and much more. The Ruby Peak 48 Hour Film Festival was established during this time. The building was also placed on the Historic Register.

In 2013, the Bushes returned to international teaching and sold the theatre.

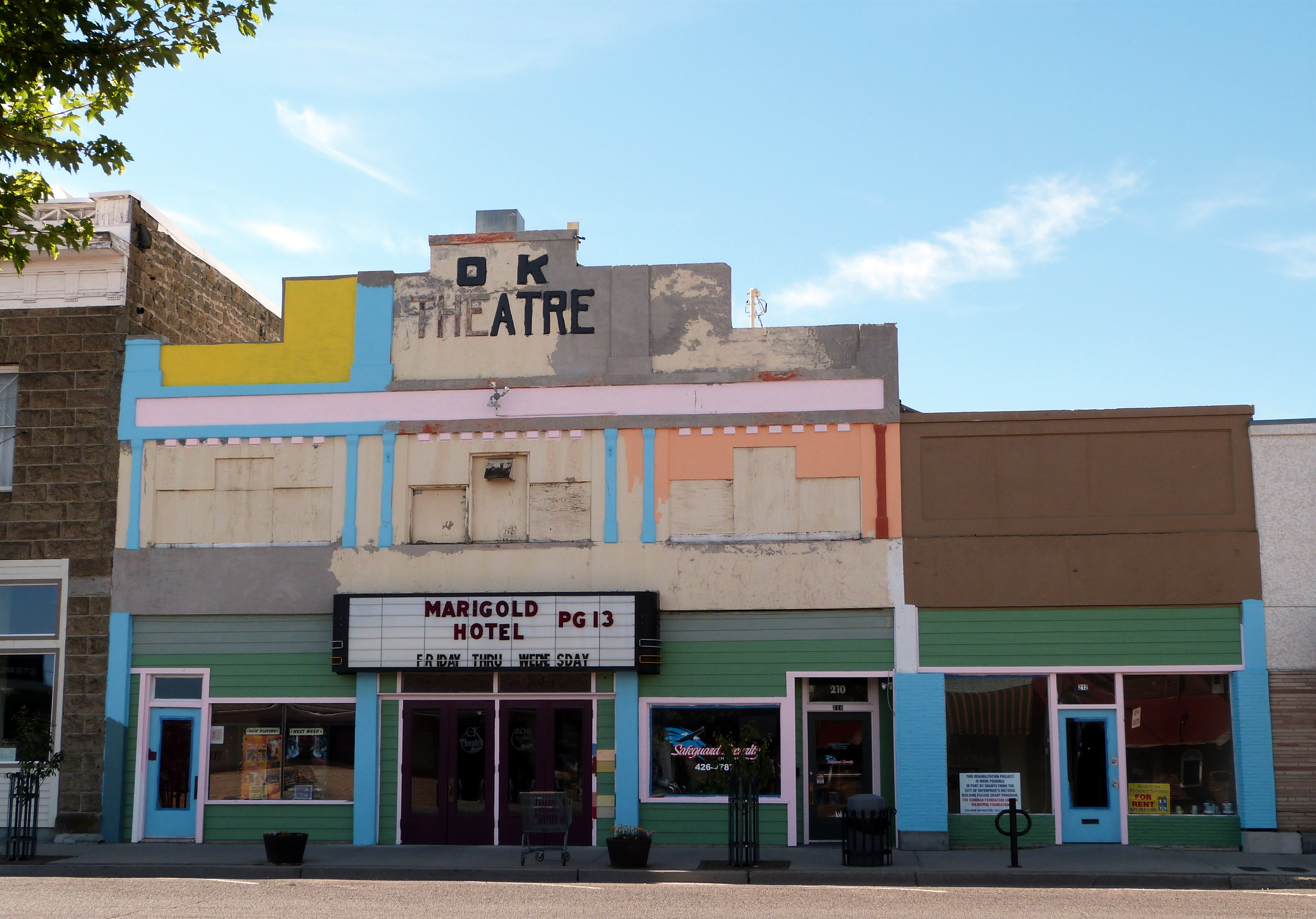
Building in 2012

The theatre was purchased in the fall of 2013 and has returned to its roots as primarily a music and theater hall. The theatre has hosted such acts from blues to bluegrass, indie to experimental with bands such as The Infamous String Dusters, Rick Estrin and the Nightcats, and Mount Eerie as well various children's theater production and community events.
