= William P. Warnock House =

Historic house in Oregon, United States

- U.S. National Register of Historic Places
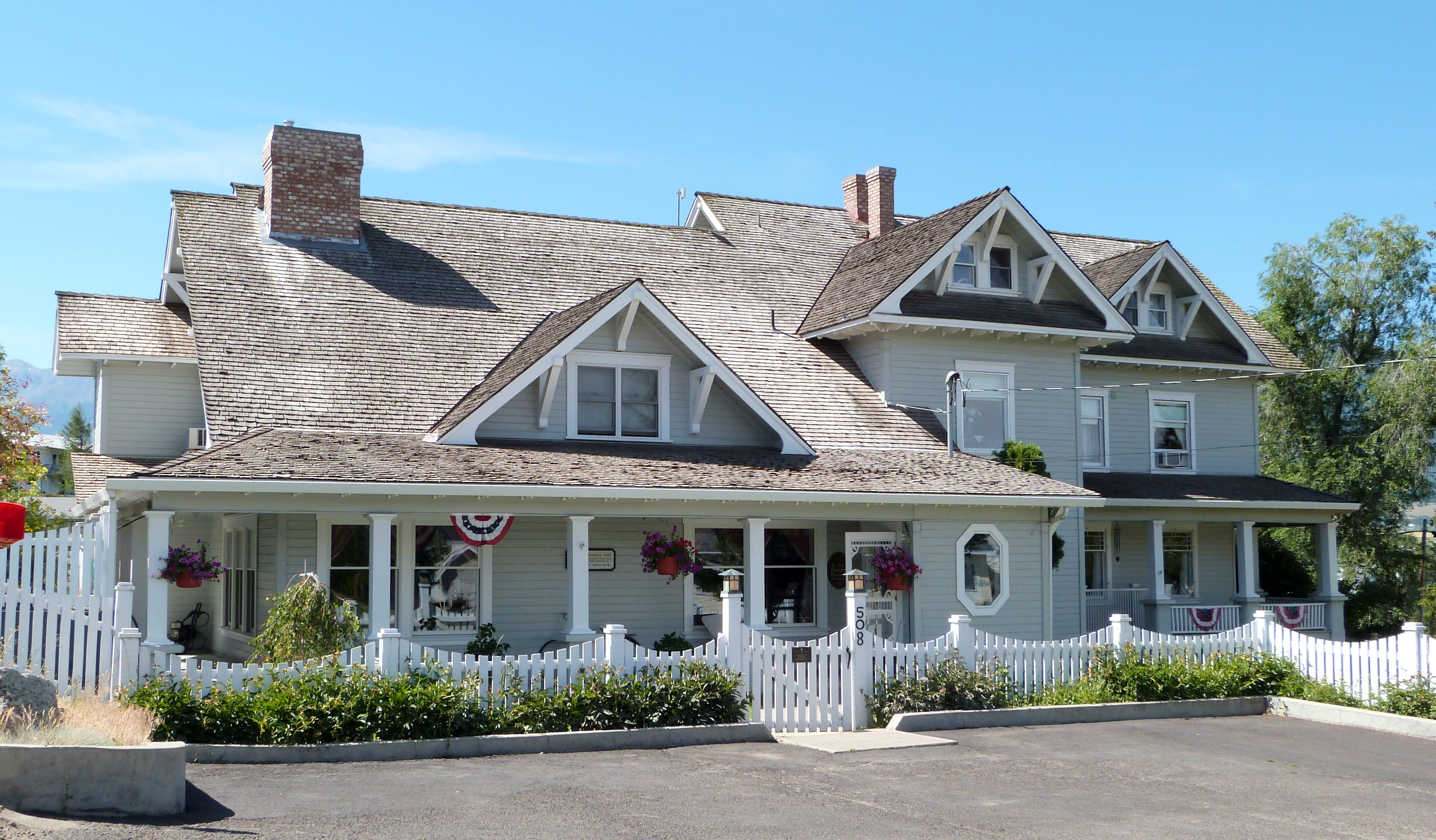

- Location within Oregon Location within the United States
- Location: 501 S. 5th St., Enterprise, Oregon
- Coordinates: 45°25′16″N 117°16′8″W
- Area: less than one acre
- Built: 1910
- Built by: Knowten, Cal (attributed)
- Architectural style: Colonial Revival, Bungalow/craftsman, Queen Anne
- NRHP reference No.: 84000486
- Added to NRHP: November 15, 1984

The William P. Warnock House, at 501 S. 5th St. in Enterprise, Oregon, is a 2 1/2-story historic house was built in 1910 and has been the largest house in Enterprise. It includes elements of Colonial Revival, Bungalow/craftsman, and Queen Anne architecture.

It was listed on the National Register of Historic Places in 1984. It was deemed significant for its architecture and its good preservation, as well as for its association with W. P. Warnock, a pioneer of Wallowa County, who had the house built for his children to attend school in Enterprise.
