= Enterprise Mercantile and Milling Company Building =

- U.S. National Register of Historic Places
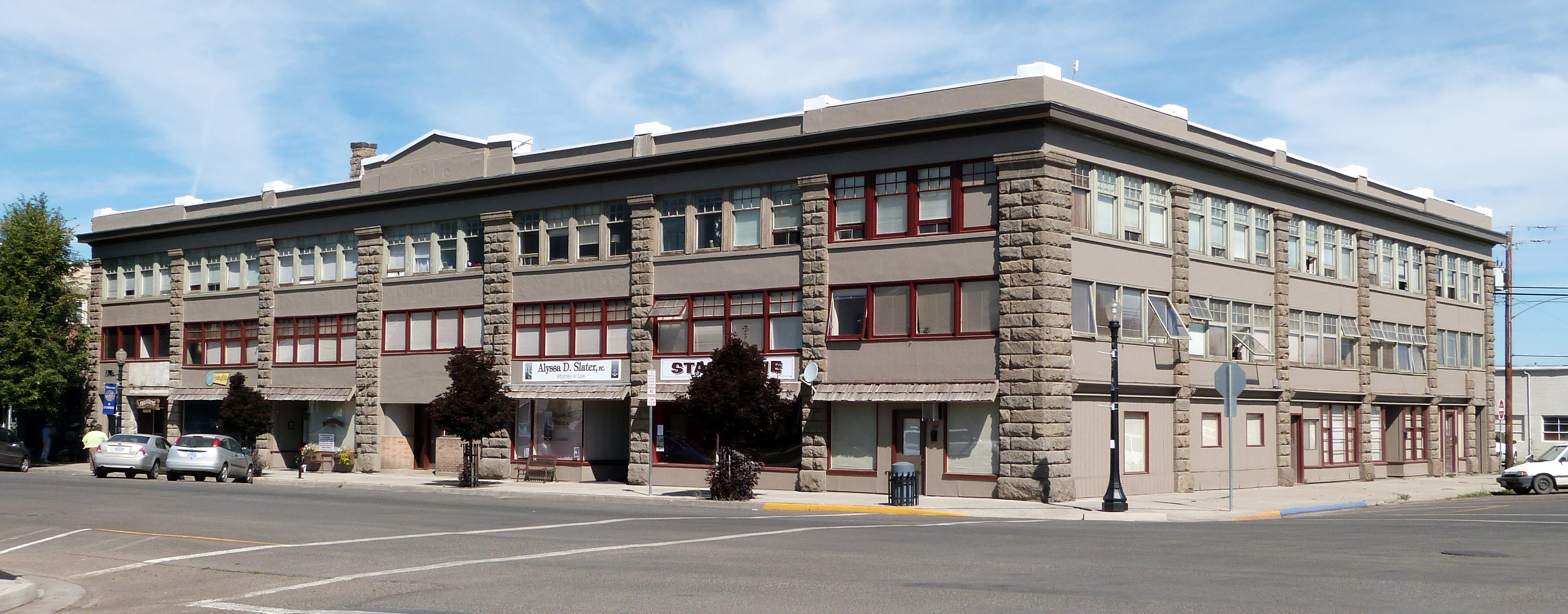

- Location within Oregon Location within the United States
- Location: 115 E Main Street, Enterprise, Oregon
- Coordinates: 45°25′33″N 117°16′42″W
- Built: 1916-22
- Architect: Tourtellotte and Hummel
- MPS: Downtown Enterprise Multiple Property Submission
- NRHP reference No.: 12000084
- Added to NRHP: March 7, 2012

The Enterprise Mercantile and Milling Company Building, at 115 E Main Street in Enterprise, Oregon, US, is a three-story historic building built during 1916–22. It was listed on the U.S. National Register of Historic Places in 2012, along with two others recommended by Oregon's State Advisory Committee on Historic Preservation in October, 2011. It "is the largest and most impressive commercial building in downtown" Enterprise.

It was one of the first downtown Enterprise commercial buildings. It was designed by the architects Tourtellotte and Hummel.

The store failed in 1925 and ownership was taken by Wallowa County in the 1930s; the county then renovated it to provide housing.

In 2011, the building was getting a "facelift", partly grant-funded.
