= Hoodoo Ridge Lookout =

- U.S. National Register of Historic Places
- U.S. Historic district
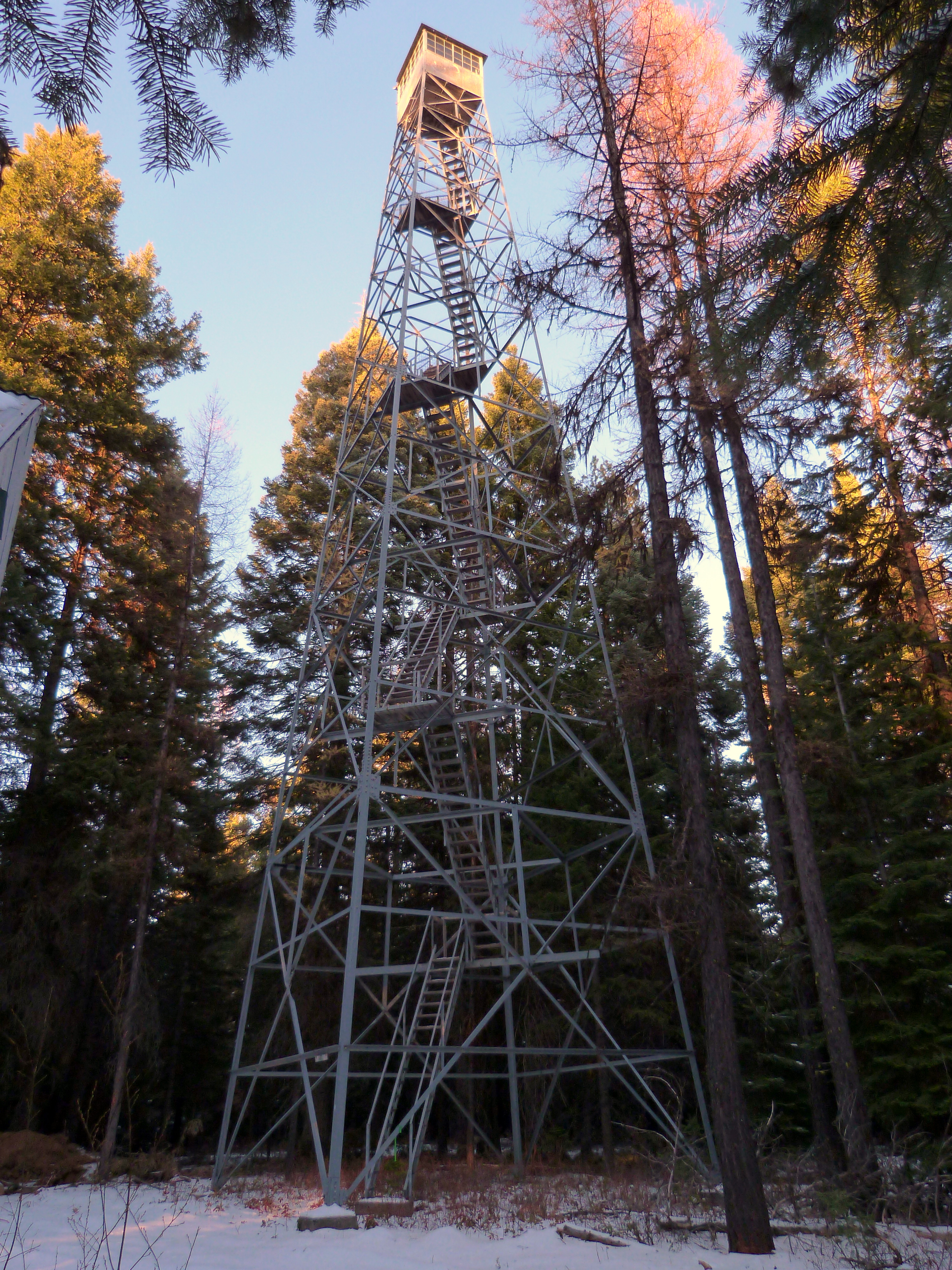
- The historic Hoodoo Ridge Lookout station

- Location within Oregon Location within the United States
- Location: Umatilla National Forest, Walla Walla Ranger District, Oregon
- Nearest city: Troy, Oregon
- Coordinates: 45°56′52″N 117°36′40″W
- Area: less than one acre
- Built: 1925
- NRHP reference No.: 15000273
- Added to NRHP: May 26, 2015

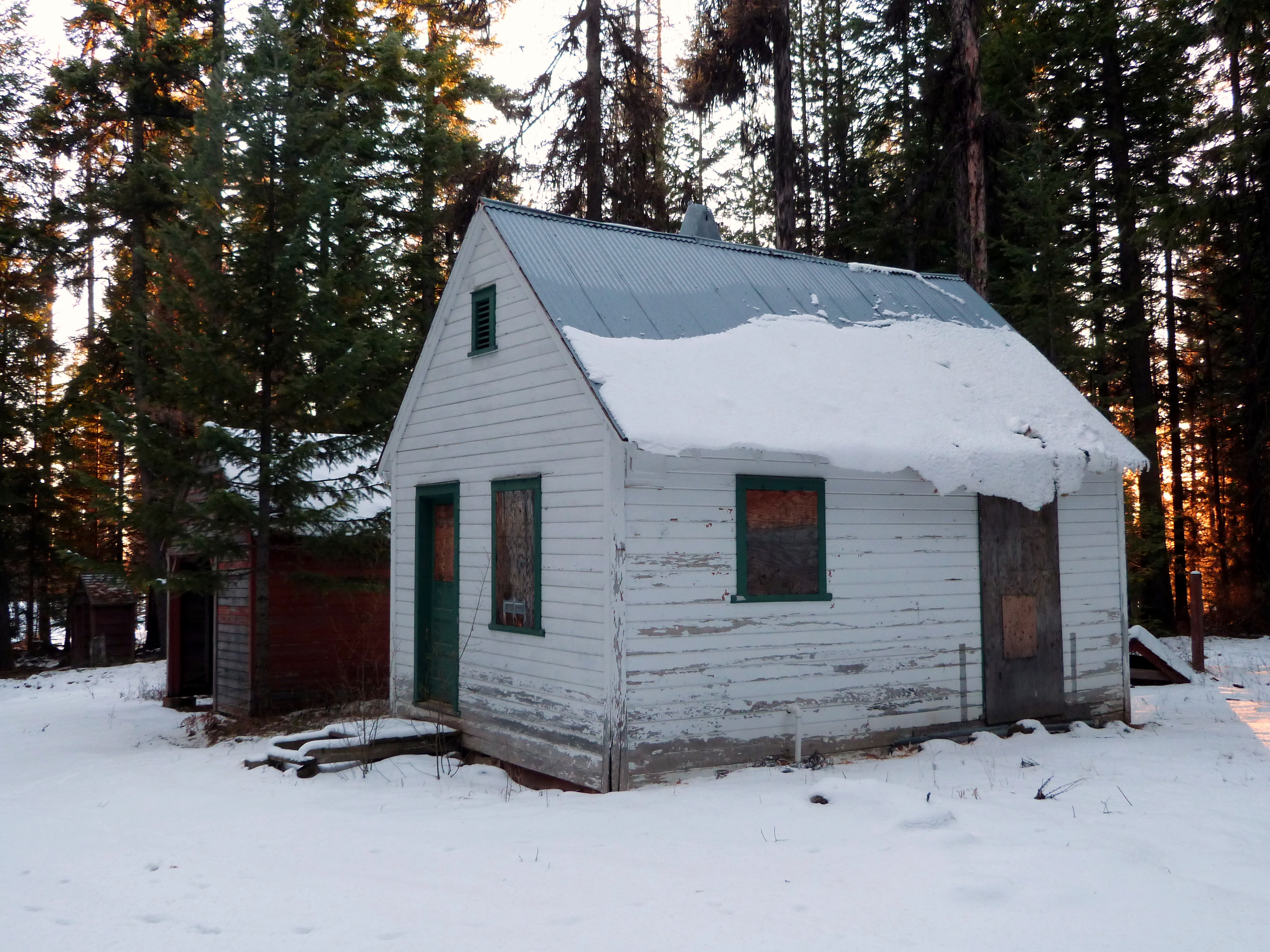
Hoodoo Ridge Lookout Station ground cabin and garage

The Hoodoo Ridge Lookout is a historic fire lookout in the Umatilla National Forest (Walla Walla Ranger District) near Troy, Oregon, in the United States. It was added to the National Register of Historic Places as a historic district on May 26, 2015.

Built starting in 1925 and operating until the 1970s, the site served as a United States Forest Service fire lookout. The district includes three contributing buildings and two contributing structures. The site contains a 1925 crows nest, a 1933 lookout tower, a 1933 cabin and garage, and an outhouse that may have been contemporaneous.

== See also ==
- National Register of Historic Places listings in Wallowa County, Oregon
