= Enterprise High School (Oregon) =

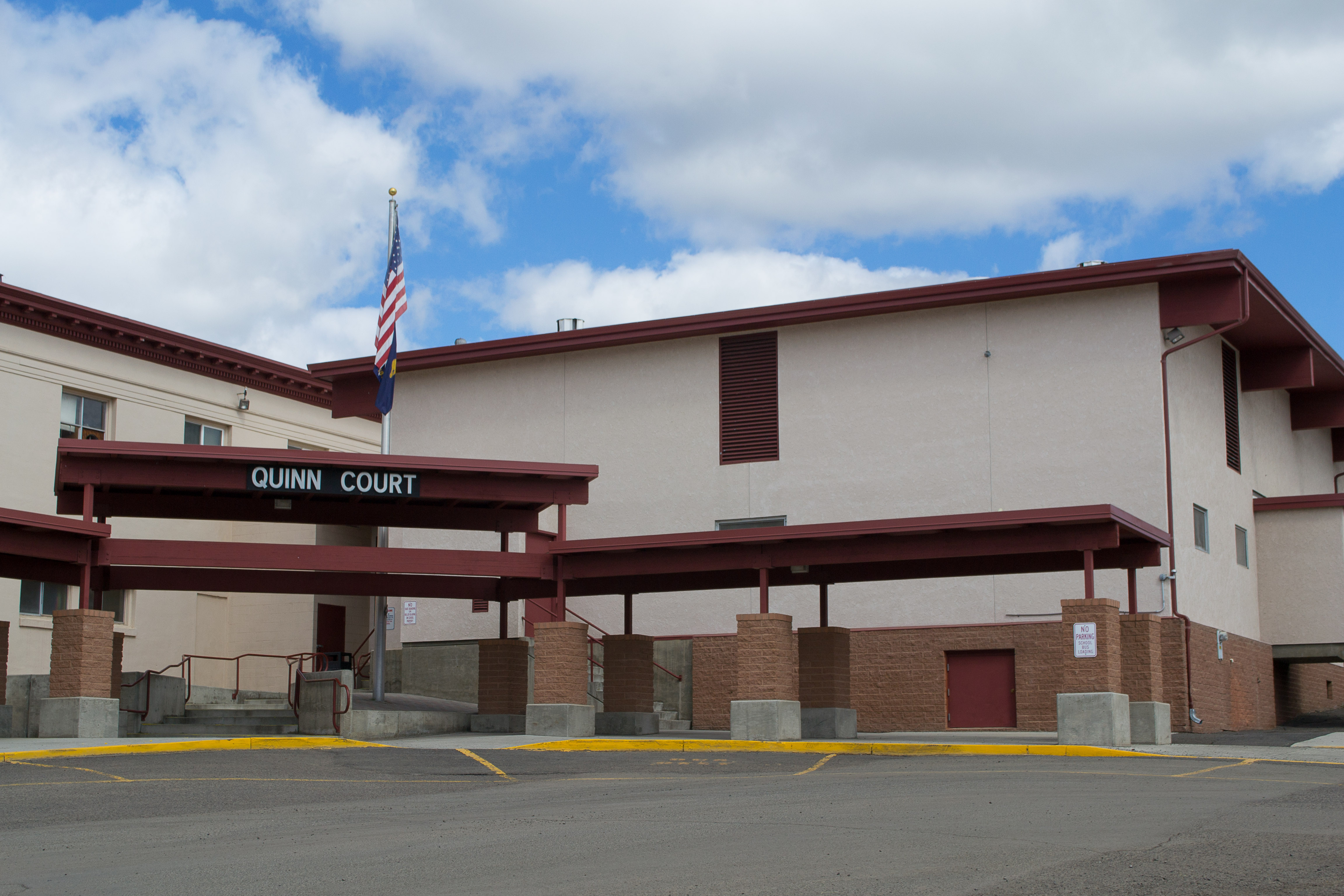

Location
- 201 SE 4th Street; Enterprise, Wallowa County, Oregon 97828; United States; 45.42476°N 117.272208°W

Information
- Type: Public
- School district: Enterprise School District
- Principal: Megan Hunter
- Teaching staff: 16.18 (FTE)
- Grades: 7-12
- Enrollment: 199 (2023–2024)
- Student to teacher ratio: 12.30
- Colors: Red and black
- Athletics conference: OSAA Wapiti League 2A-6
- Mascot: Outlaws
- Website: mhs.enterprise.k12.or.us

Enterprise High School is a public high school in Enterprise, Oregon, United States. It is a part of the Enterprise School District.

== Academics ==
In 2008, 92% of the school's seniors received their high school diploma. Of 39 students, 36 graduated, 0 dropped out, and 3 were still in high school the next year.
