= Lostine Pharmacy =

Historic building in Oregon

- U.S. National Register of Historic Places
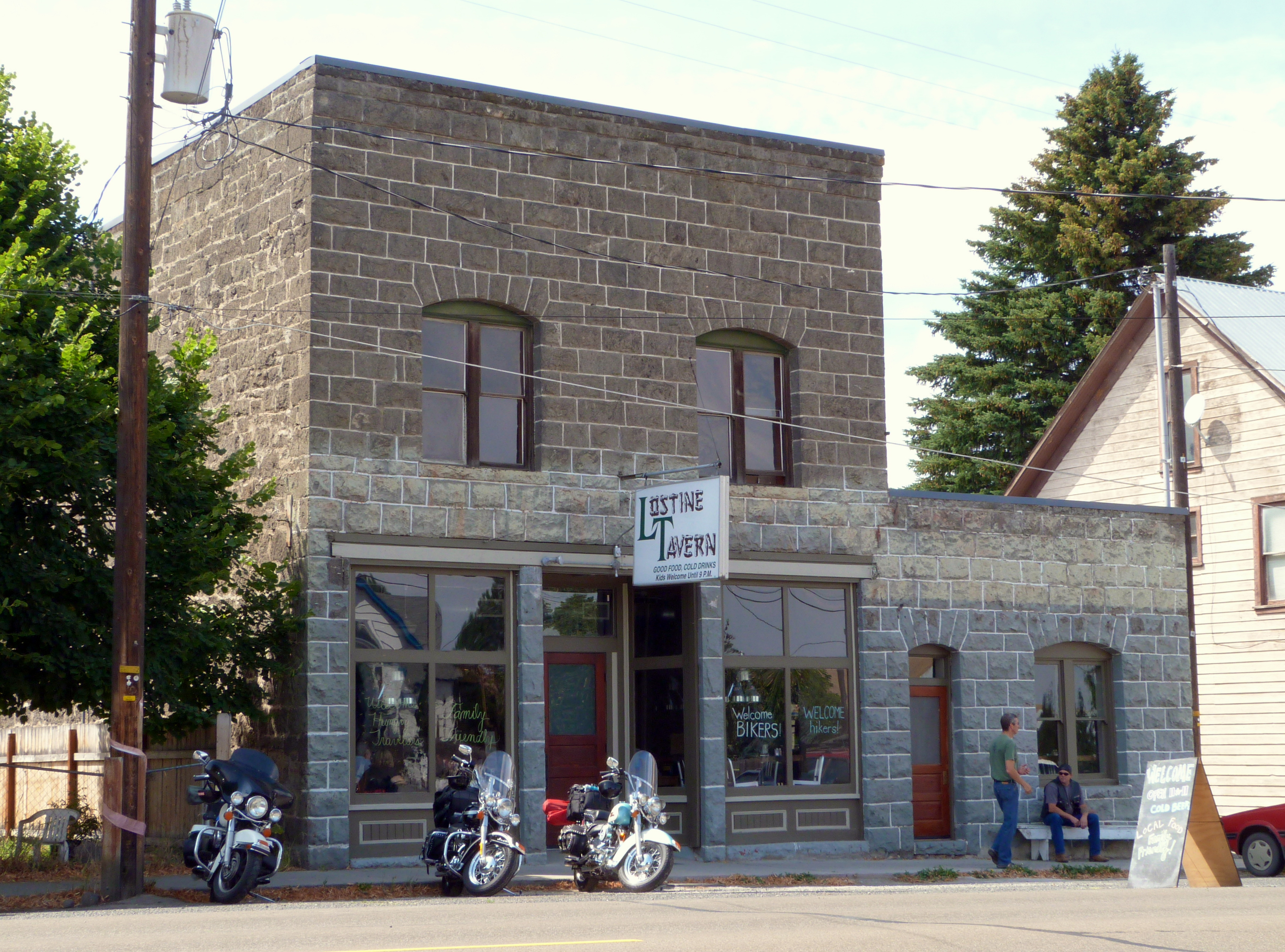
- The building's exterior in 2014

- Location within Oregon
- Location: Lostine, Oregon
- Coordinates: 45°29′18″N 117°25′57″W
- Built: 1900
- NRHP reference No.: 14000961
- Added to NRHP: November 24, 2014

Lostine Pharmacy, also known as Lostine Tavern, is an historic building in Lostine, Oregon. It was constructed in 1900 and is listed on the National Register of Historic Places.

== See also ==
- National Register of Historic Places listings in Wallowa County, Oregon
