= Enterprise School District (Oregon) =

School district in Oregon, United States

Enterprise School District is a school district headquartered in Enterprise, Oregon. It operates Enterprise Elementary School and Enterprise Middle/High School.

The district is entirely in Wallowa County.

In 2001 the district had a budget shortfall of $350,000.

In 2026 the school district selected Dan Wold as its superintendent.
