= KWVR-FM =

- Enterprise, Oregon; United States
- Frequency: 92.1 MHz
- Branding: Music Country

Programming
- Format: Country
- Affiliations: Townhall News

Ownership
- Owner: Wallowa Valley Radio, LLC
- Sister stations: KWVR

History
- First air date: 1987
- Call sign meaning: Wallowa Valley Radio

Technical information
- Licensing authority: FCC
- Facility ID: 70756
- Class: A
- ERP: 320 watts
- HAAT: 534 meters (1,752 feet)
- Transmitter coordinates: 45°23′55.5″N 117°23′20.6″W

Links
- Public license information: Public file; LMS
- Webcast: Listen Live
- Website: kwvrradio.net

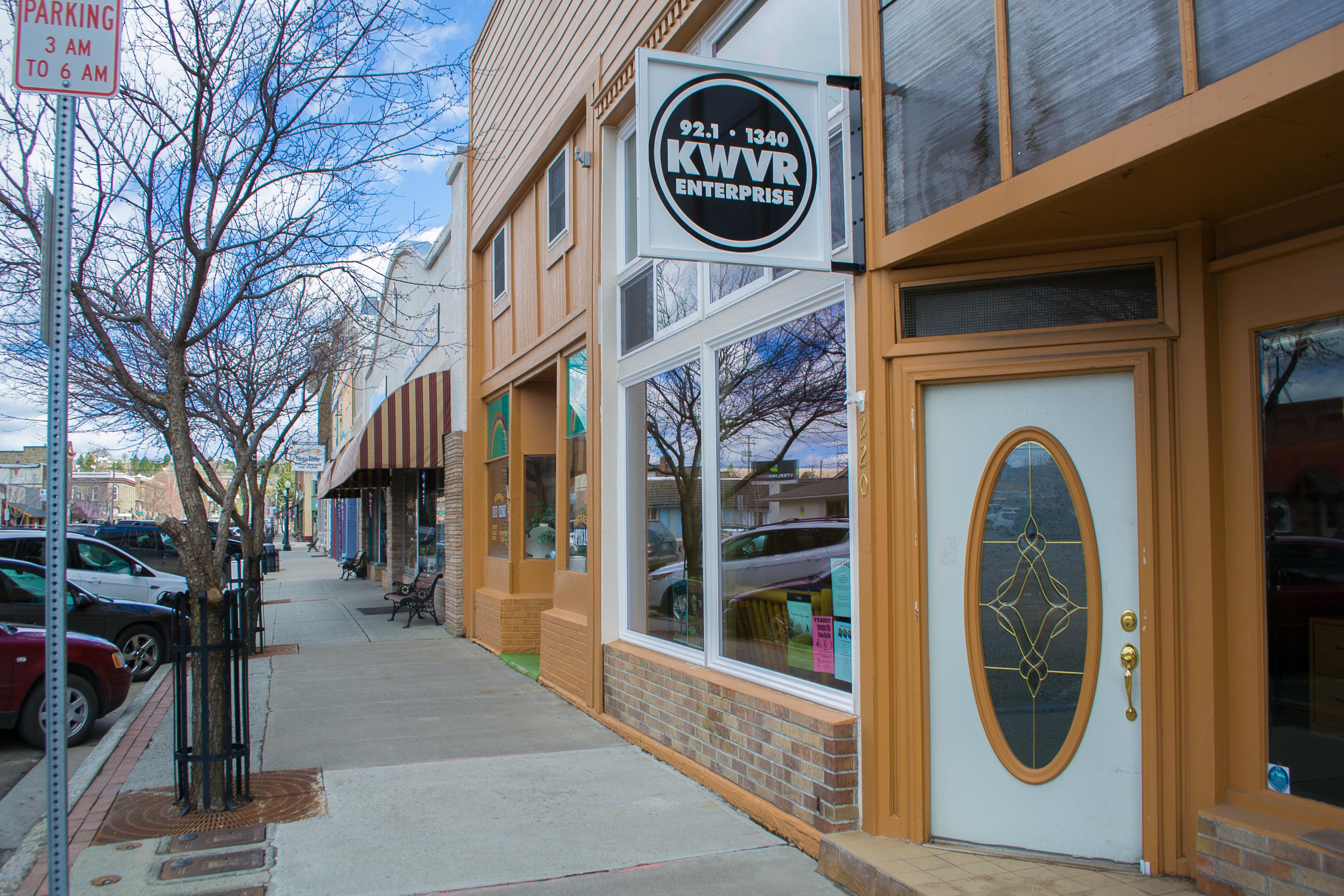
KWVR studios in Enterprise, Oregon

KWVR-FM (92.1 MHz, "Music Country") is a radio station licensed to serve Enterprise, Oregon, United States. The station, which began broadcasting in 1987, is owned by Wallowa Valley Radio, LLC.

== Programming ==
KWVR-FM broadcasts a full-service country music format including local and regional news as well as community affairs programming. In addition to its usual music and news programming, KWVR-FM carries select sporting events as an affiliate of the Oregon State Beavers Radio Network.

== History ==
This station received its original construction permit from the FCC on June 12, 1984. The new station was assigned the call letters KWVR-FM by the FCC on July 3, 1984.

In June 1984, Tri-State Communications Corporation, Inc., reached an agreement to transfer the permit for this still-under construction station to the Wallowa Valley Radio Broadcasting Corporation, a company wholly owned by Lee D. Perkins and Carol-Lee Perkins, a married couple. The deal was approved by the FCC on August 13, 1984, and the transaction was completed on November 19, 1984. After a series of extensions and modifications, KWVR-FM finally received its license to cover from the FCC on January 19, 1988.

In December 2008, the Wallowa Valley Radio Broadcasting Corporation agreed to transfer the license for this station to Wallowa Valley Radio, LLC, for a cash sale price of $650,000. The transfer was approved by the FCC on January 27, 2009, and the transaction was consummated on March 1, 2009. Wallowa Valley Radio, LLC, is wholly owned by members of the Frasch family of Chanhassen and Fairmont, Minnesota. The Frasch family has owned ranching property in Wallowa County, Oregon, for more than 20 years.

== Awards and honors ==
In 1986, KWVR-FM became the smallest-market radio station to win an award from the American Women in Radio and Television. The "Gracie Award", as it is known, was presented at a ceremony in New York City hosted by Helen Hayes and Barbara Walters. The award recognized the station for a series of biographical portraits by Molly Murrill titled "Women of Achievement in the Wallowa Country".

On September 13, 2003, Lee Perkins was named Broadcaster of the Year by the Oregon Association of Broadcasters. Citing his "significant and lasting contribution to Oregon broadcasting", the OAB presented the award to the man known as the "Voice of Wallowa County" at their annual conference in Portland, Oregon.

Lee and Carol-Lee Perkins were chosen to preside as Grand Marshals of the 59th Annual Chief Joseph Days celebration in July 2004. The annual event is held in Joseph, Oregon.

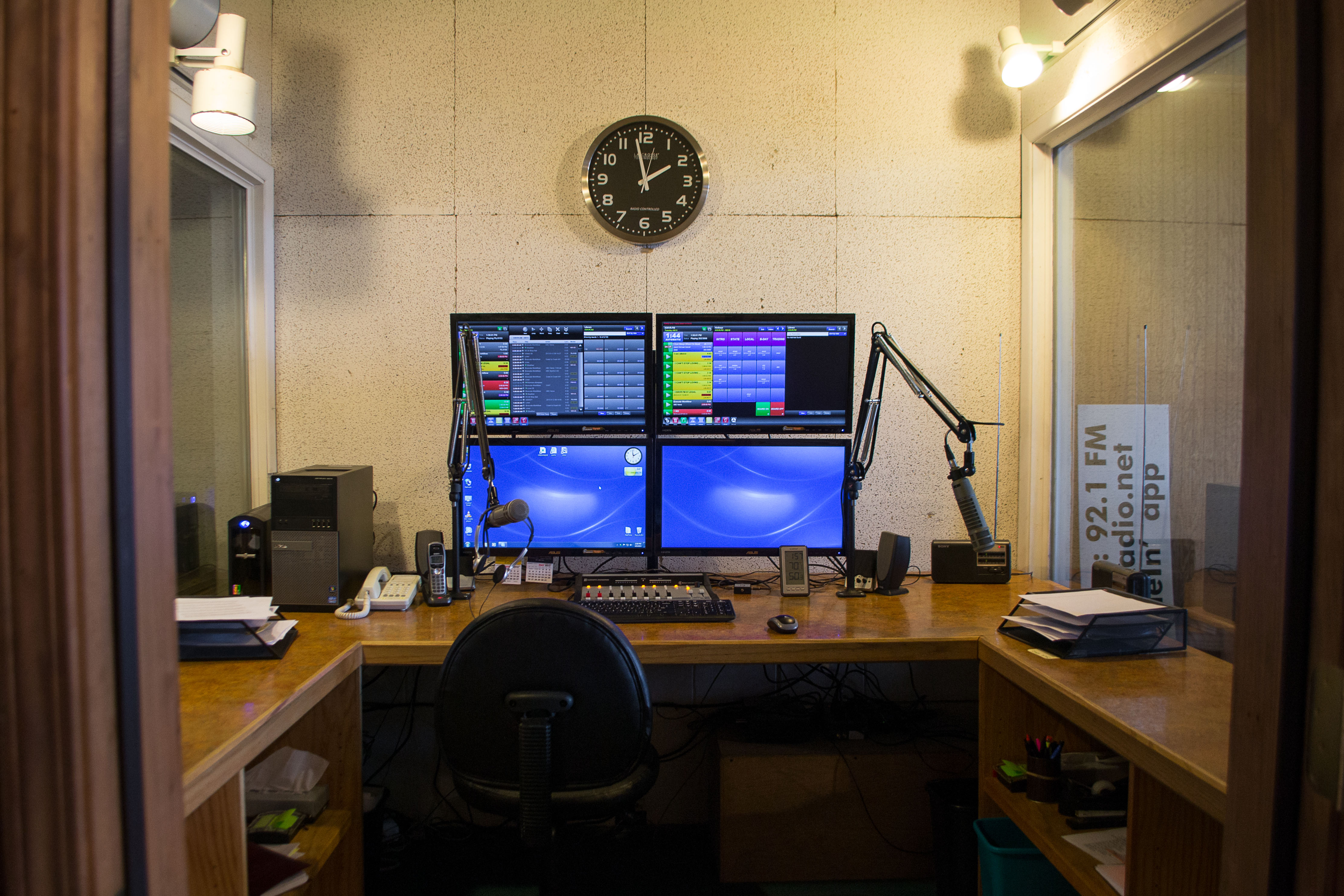
KWVR booth
