= Dr. J. W. Barnard Building and First National Bank of Joseph =

- U.S. National Register of Historic Places
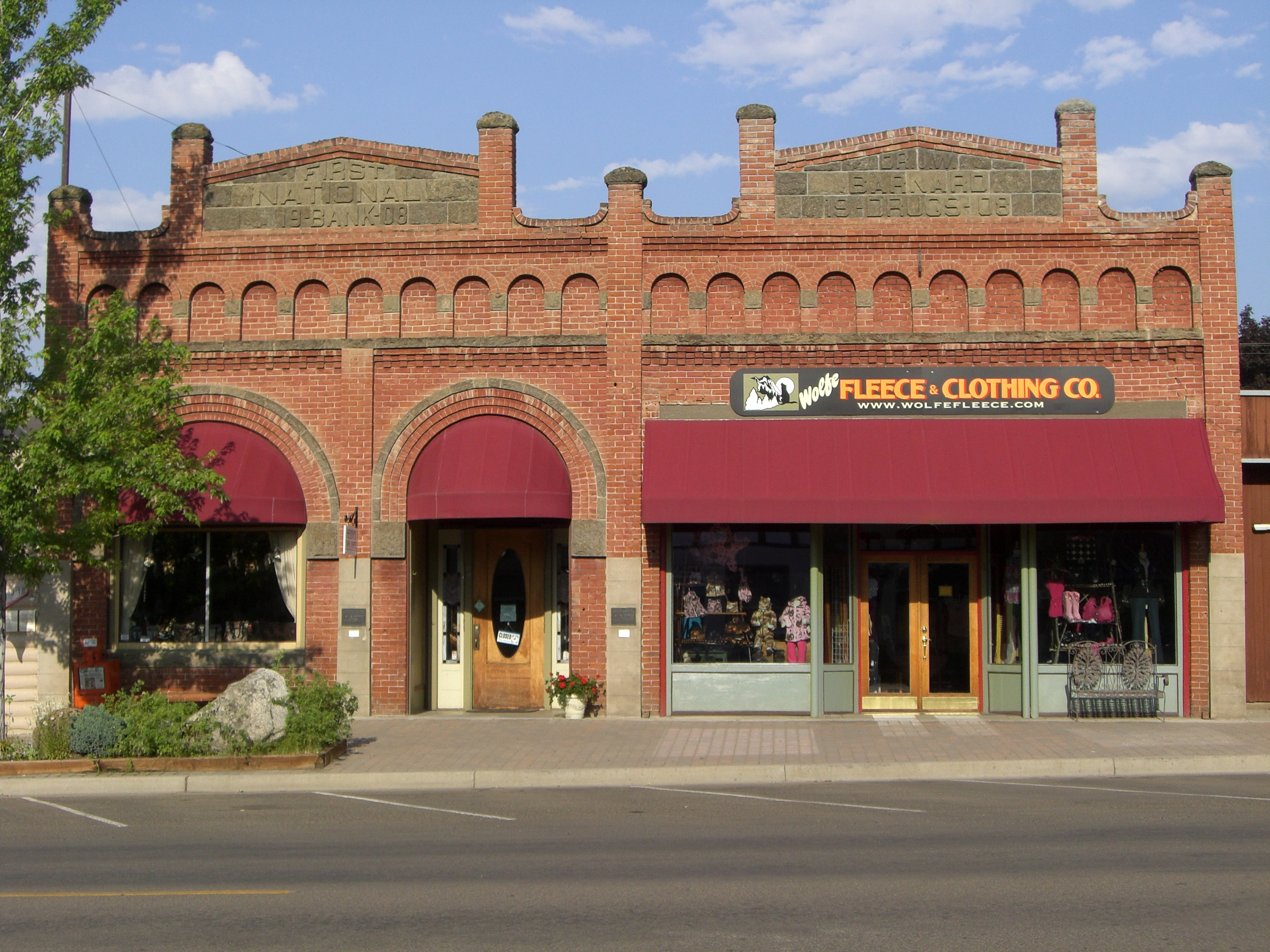

- Location within Oregon Location within the United States
- Location: 012--014 Main St., Joseph, Oregon
- Coordinates: 45°21′7″N 117°13′41″W
- Area: 0.1 acres (0.040 ha)
- Built: 1908
- Built by: Marr, Frank
- Architect: Flesch, J.A., & Sons;
- Architectural style: Romanesque, Richardsonian Romanesque
- NRHP reference No.: 91000810
- Added to NRHP: June 19, 1991

The Dr. J. W. Barnard Building and First National Bank of Joseph, at 12 - 14 Main St. in Joseph, Oregon, is a pair of historic adjacent buildings sharing a common interior wall. They were built by investment of physician Dr. J. W. Barnard, rancher Ludwig Knapper, and banker Frederick Scribner. Each building is 25 by 60 feet (7.6 m × 18.3 m) in footprint.

The Dr. J. W. Barnard Building was built in 1908 by local contractor Frank Marr, with design by Chicago architects J.A. Flesch & Son.

The First National Bank Building was also built in 1908 by Frank Marr. It was used as a bank until the bank failed in 1925; it was then used as a post office.

The pair of buildings was listed on the National Register of Historic Places in 1991; the listing included two contributing buildings.
