= KWVR (AM) =

- Enterprise, Oregon; United States
- Broadcast area: Wallowa County, Oregon
- Frequency: 1340 kHz

Programming
- Format: News/Talk/Sports
- Affiliations: Citadel Media

Ownership
- Owner: Wallowa Valley Radio, LLC
- Sister stations: KWVR-FM

History
- First air date: June 1, 1960
- Call sign meaning: K Wallowa Valley Radio

Technical information
- Licensing authority: FCC
- Facility ID: 70744
- Class: C
- Power: 1,000 watts (unlimited)
- Transmitter coordinates: 45°23′58″N 117°15′30″W

Links
- Public license information: Public file; LMS
- Website: kwvrradio.net/main

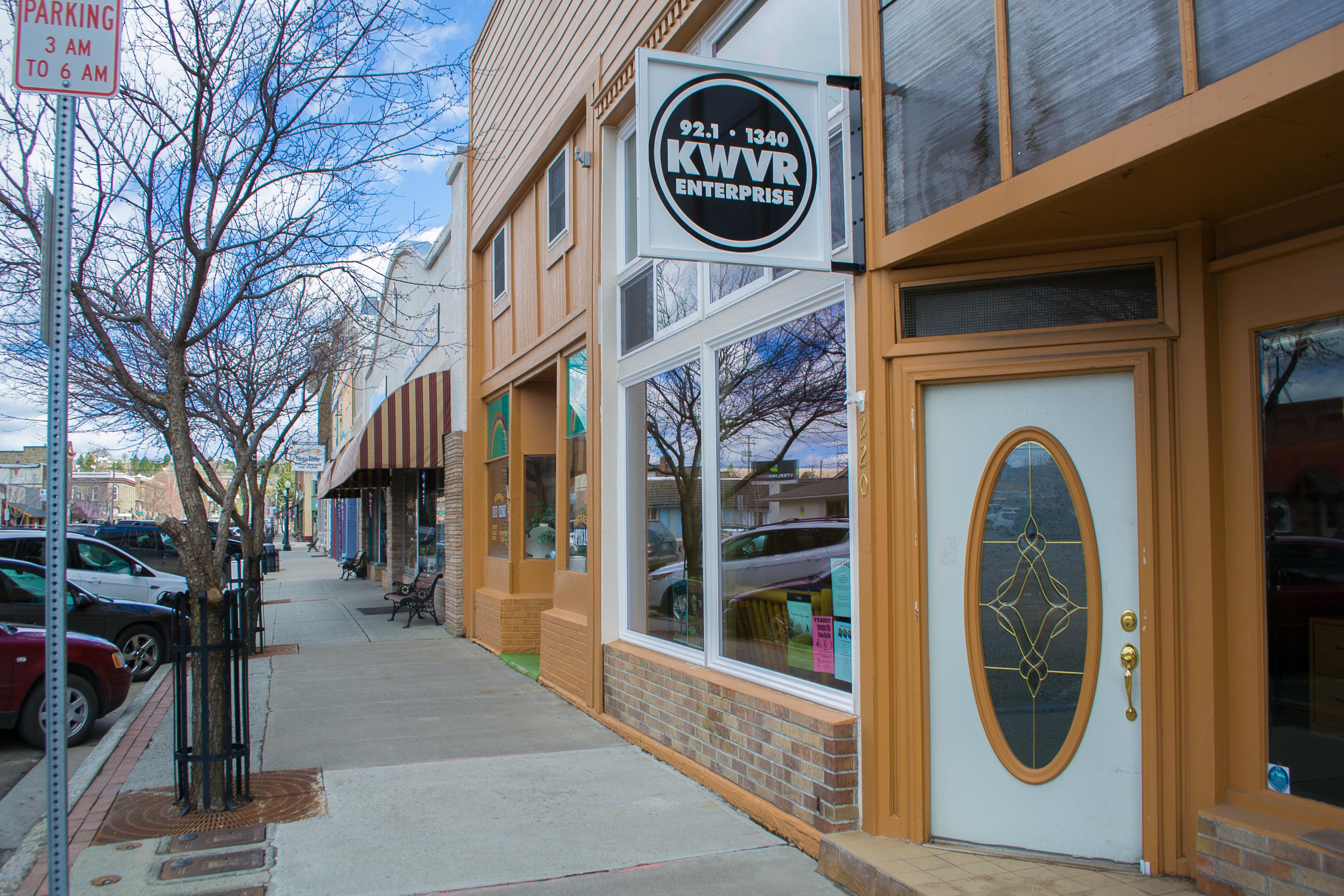
KWVR studios in Enterprise, Oregon

KWVR (1340 AM) is a Class C radio station licensed to serve Enterprise, Oregon, United States. The station, established in 1960, and its FM sister station KWVR-FM are currently owned by Wallowa Valley Radio, LLC. Wallowa Valley Radio, LLC, is wholly owned by family members Richard, Mary, and David Frasch.

== Programming ==
KWVR broadcasts a news/talk radio format which features a mix of local and syndicated news, talk, sports, and information programming.

=== Syndicated programs ===
Weekday syndicated programs include talk shows hosted by Rush Limbaugh, Lars Larson, Dennis Miller, and When Radio Was, plus Coast to Coast AM hosted by George Noory. Notable weekend programming includes a computer advice show with Kim Komando, Moneytalk with Bob Brinker, Red Steagall's Cowboy Corner, The Cowboy Show with Ken Overcast, and The Horse Show with Rick Lamb.

=== Sports programs ===
Sporting events broadcast by KWVR include Oregon State University Beavers football.

== History ==
=== The beginning ===
This station began regular broadcast operations on June 1, 1960, serving Wallowa County, Oregon, with 250 watts of power on a frequency of 1340 kHz. The station was assigned the KWVR call sign by the Federal Communications Commission on. Original station owner Gene W. Wilson also served as company president, commercial manager, and general manager of KWVR. Through the late 1960s and into the early 1970s, the station aired a mixed format of middle of the road and country & western music.

=== A decade of change ===
Nearly fifteen years after construction on KWVR began, owner Gene W. Wilson agreed to sell the station to David D. Dirks in a deal that closed in November 1974. Dirks continued the station's mix of MOR and country music through the end of the 1970s.

In November 1979, David D. Dirks reached an agreement to sell KWVR to High Valley East Broadcasting, Inc. The deal was approved by the FCC on December 27, 1979. Just over two years later, in February 1982, High Valley East Broadcasting, Inc., contracted to sell this station to Tri Star Communications Corporation, Inc. The deal was approved by the FCC on April 5, 1982.

The new owners filed an application with the FCC in November 1983 to increase the station's daytime signal strength from 250 to 1,000 watts. The FCC granted KWVR a new construction permit on March 22, 1983, to allow the upgrade and adding a nighttime signal at 250 watts.

=== The Perkins era ===
In June 1984, Tri Star Communications Corporation, Inc., reached an agreement to sell this station to Wallowa Valley Radio Broadcasting Corporation, a company wholly owned by Lee D. Perkins and Carol-Lee Perkins, a married couple. The deal was approved by the FCC on August 13, 1984, and the transaction was consummated on November 19, 1984. In addition to splitting management and production duties as a couple, Lee Perkins also did play-by-play for local high school sports, not missing a game for more than 24 years until pneumonia forced a break in his streak in March 2008. The Perkinses lived in the KWVR radio studio building until they sold the station in December 2008.

=== The Frasch era ===
After nearly a quarter-century of continuous ownership, Wallowa Valley Radio Broadcasting Corporation reached an agreement in December 2008 to sell this station and its KWVR-FM sister station to Wallowa Valley Radio, LLC, for a combined sale price of $650,000. The deal was approved by the FCC on January 27, 2009, and the transaction was consummated on March 1, 2009.

Wallowa Valley Radio, LLC, is wholly owned by family members Richard, Mary, and David Frasch of Chanhassen and Fairmont, Minnesota. The Frasch family has owned ranching property in Wallowa County, Oregon, for more than 25 years.

== Awards and honors ==
On September 13, 2003, Lee Perkins was named Broadcaster of the Year by the Oregon Association of Broadcasters. Citing his "significant and lasting contribution to Oregon broadcasting", the OAB presented the award to the man known as the "Voice of Wallowa County" at their annual conference in Portland, Oregon.

Lee and Carol-Lee Perkins were chosen to preside as Grand Marshals of the 59th Annual Chief Joseph Days celebration in July 2004. The annual event is held in Joseph, Oregon.

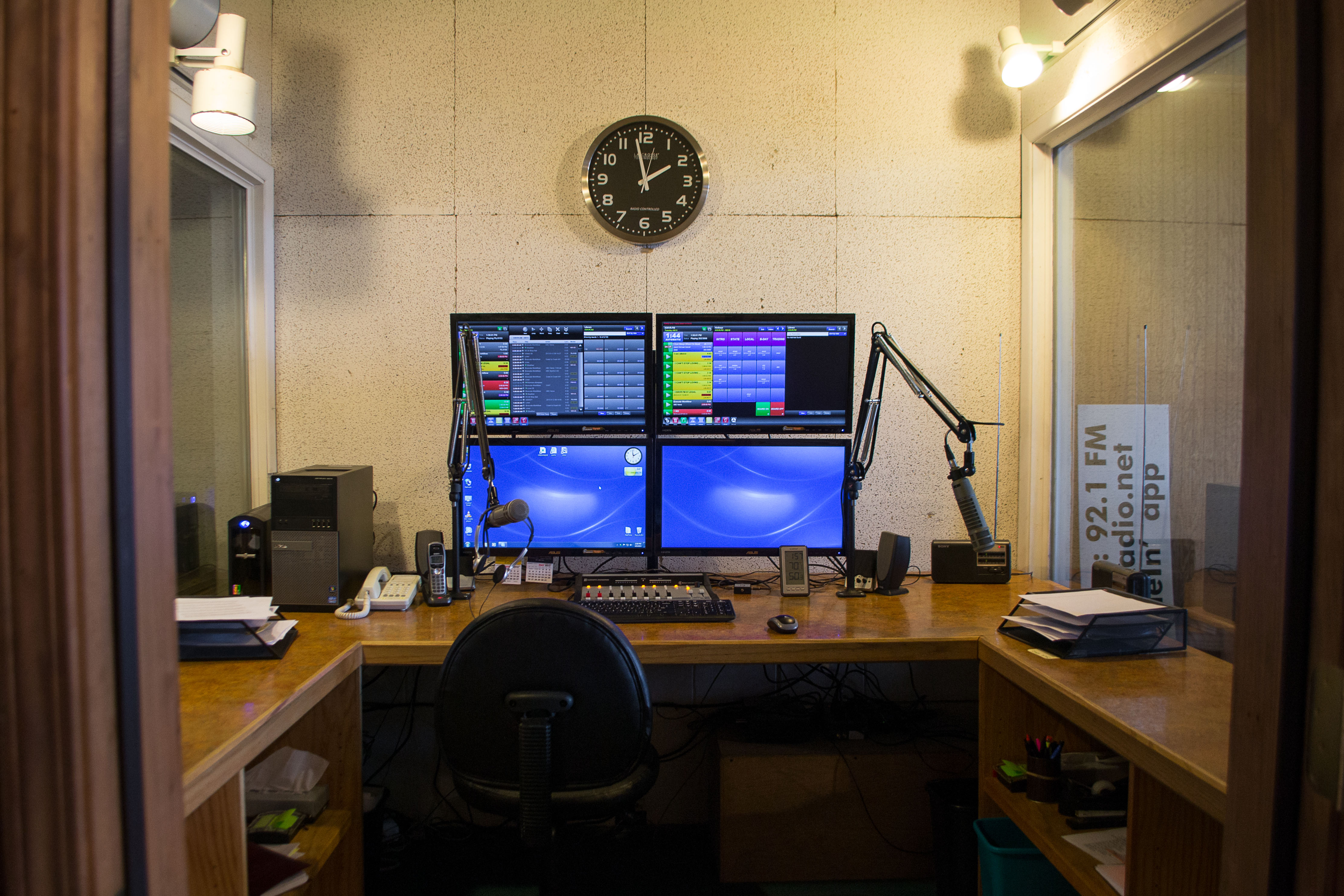
KWVR booth
