= Wallowa Ranger Station =

- U.S. National Register of Historic Places
- U.S. Historic district
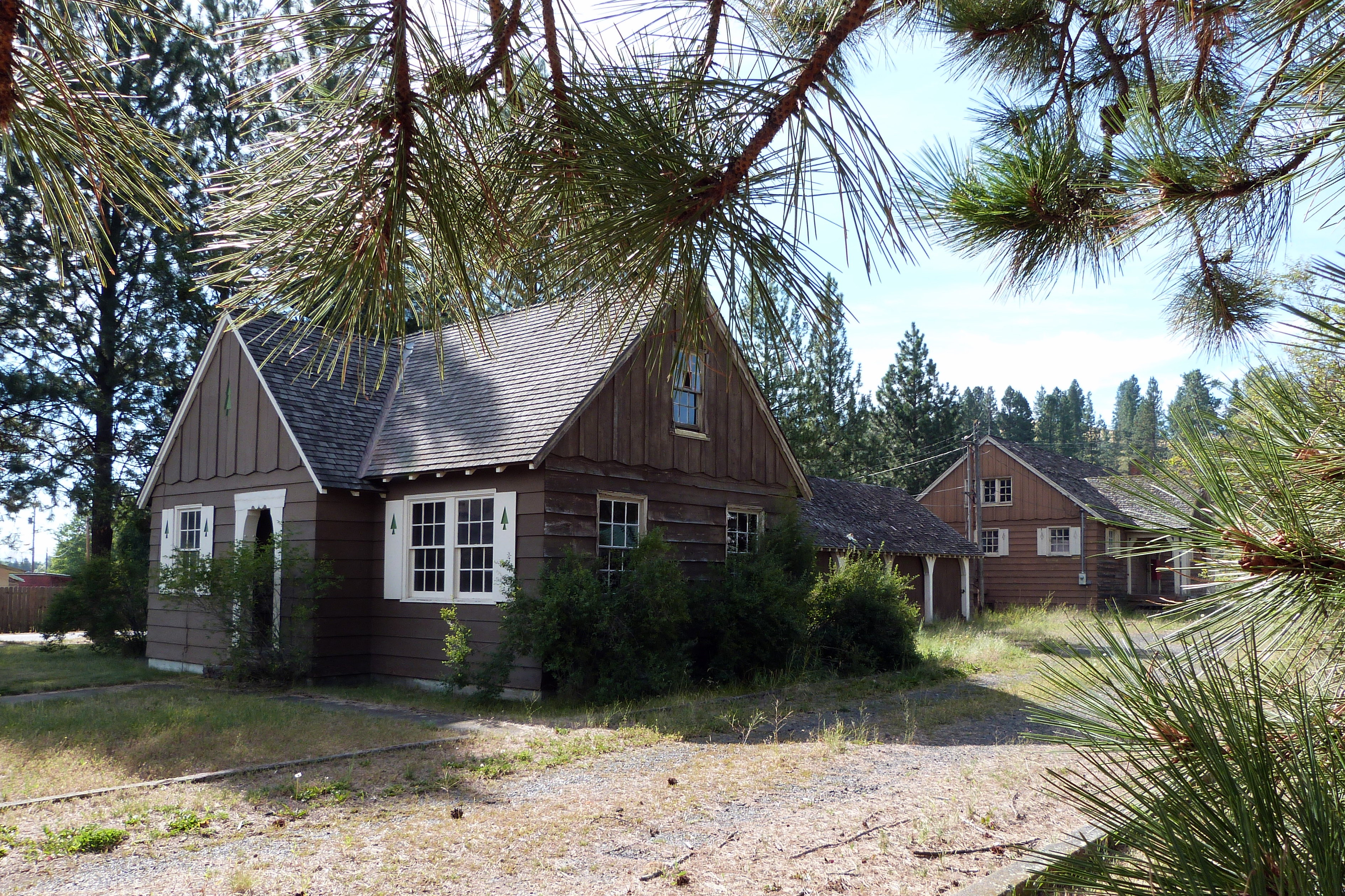

- Location within Oregon Location within the United States
- Location: 602 W. 1st St., Wallowa, Oregon
- Coordinates: 45°34′11″N 117°32′7″W
- Area: 1.2 acres (0.49 ha)
- Built: 1936
- Built by: Civilian Conservation Corps
- Architect: USDA Forest Service
- Architectural style: Late 19th And Early 20th Century American Movements, Rustic
- MPS: Depression-Era Buildings TR
- NRHP reference No.: 09000865
- Added to NRHP: October 28, 2009

The Wallowa Ranger Station at 602 W. 1st St. in Wallowa, Oregon is a historic station built in 1936. It was listed on the National Register of Historic Places in 2009; the listing included five contributing buildings. It includes Late 19th and Early 20th Century American Movements architecture and Rustic architecture designed by U.S. Forest Service architects.
