= Gotter Hotel =

- U.S. National Register of Historic Places
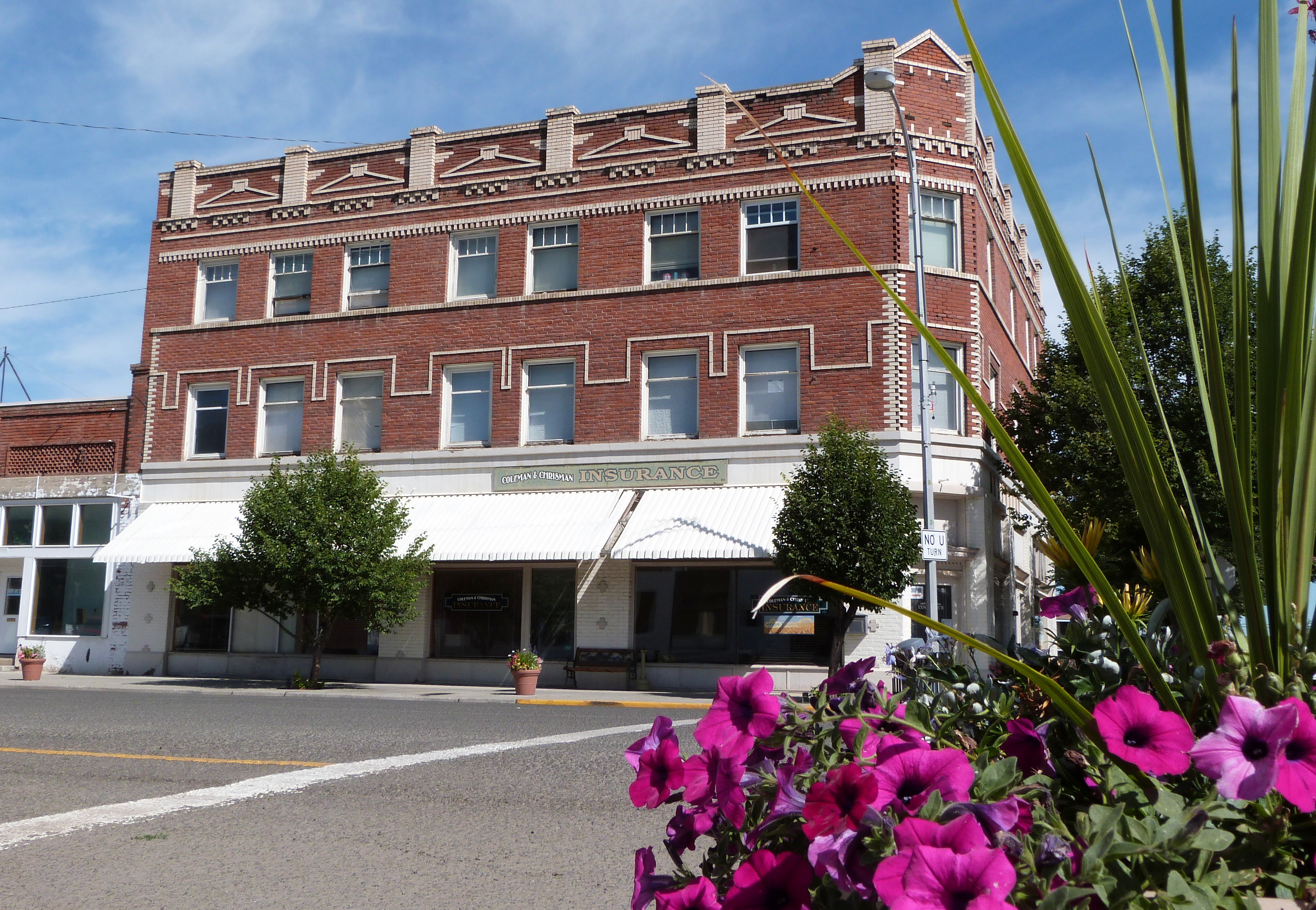

- Location within Oregon Location within the United States
- Location: 301 W. Main St., Enterprise, Oregon
- Coordinates: 45°25′33″N 117°16′46″W
- Area: less than one acre
- Built: 1917
- Architectural style: Early Commercial
- NRHP reference No.: 93001499
- Added to NRHP: January 21, 1994

The Gotter Hotel, at 301 W. Main St. in Enterprise, Oregon, is an Early Commercial-style building that was built in 1917. It is a timber post and beam building with a stretcher bond brick exterior.

It was listed on the National Register of Historic Places in 1994. It was deemed significant "as a substantial, notably intact and singular example, locally, of Commercial-style architecture expressed in polychromed brick" and as an "outstanding example" from Enterprise's commercial building boom era.
