= Wallowa County Courthouse =

- U.S. National Register of Historic Places
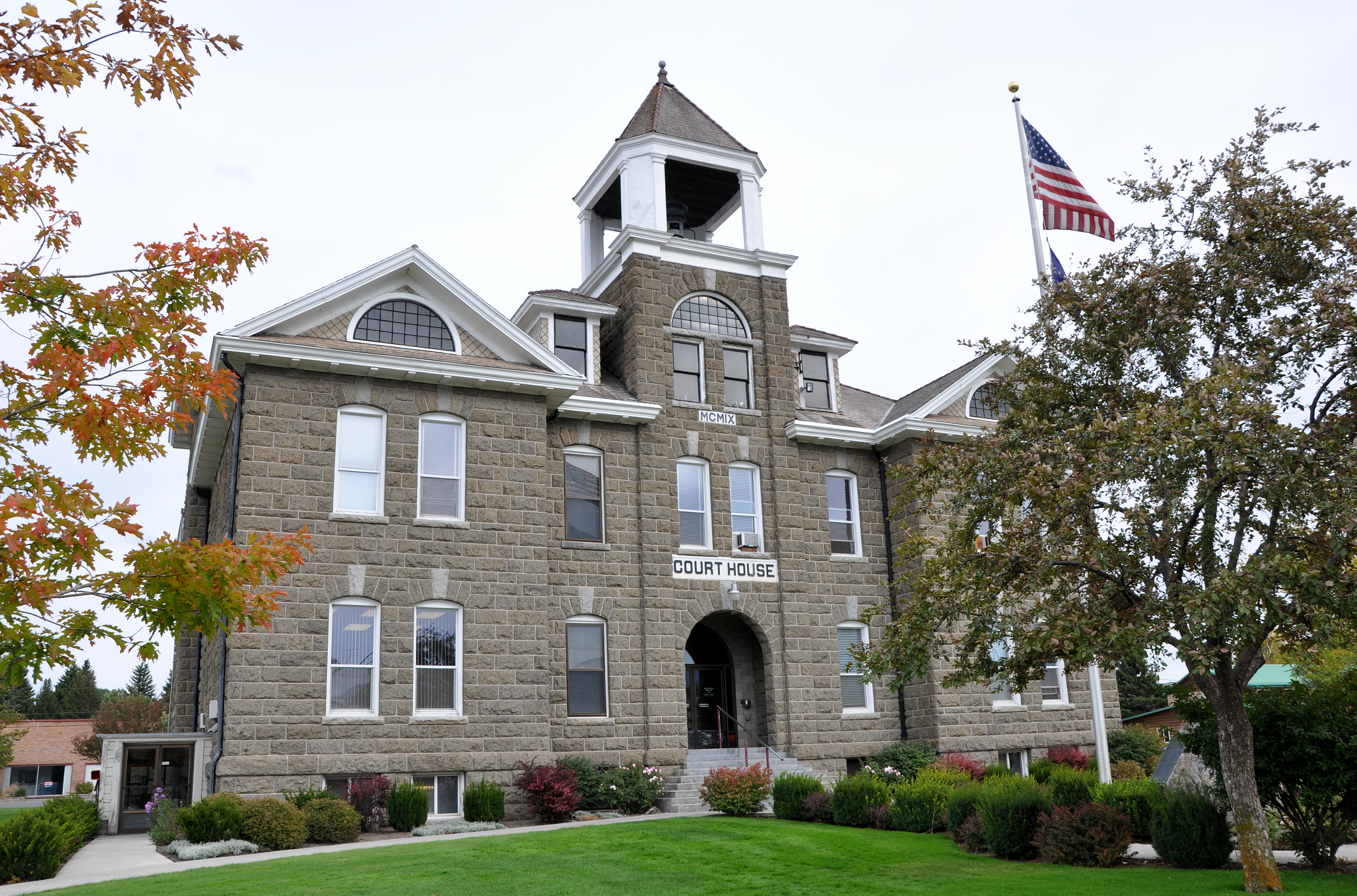
- Front facade of the Wallowa County Courthouse

- Location within Oregon Location within the United States
- Interactive map showing the location of Wallowa County Courthouse
- Location: Enterprise, Oregon, USA
- Coordinates: 45.425093°N 117.276918°W
- Built: 1909–1910
- Architect: Calvin R. Thornton
- Architectural style: Romanesque Revival with Queen Anne style elements
- NRHP reference No.: 00000805
- Added to NRHP: 2000

The Wallowa County Courthouse is the seat of government for Wallowa County in northeastern Oregon. The courthouse is located in Enterprise, Oregon. It was built in 1909–1910 using locally quarried stone. It is a massive High Victorian structure built of local Bowlby stone. The courthouse was listed on National Register of Historic Places in 2000. Today, the courthouse still houses Wallowa County government offices.

== History ==
Wallowa County is located in the northeastern corner of Oregon. It is bordered by Union and Umatilla counties to the west, Union and Baker counties to the south, the state of Washington on the north, and Idaho to the east. The county is bordered geographically by the Wallowa Mountains on the south and west, the Grande Ronde River canyon on the north, and the Snake River and Hells Canyon on the east.

The first post office in the Wallowa Valley was established in 1874. The first town in the area was Lostine, which was founded in 1875. The town of Joseph was established in 1879. Wallowa County was formally separated from Union County in February 1887, the same year the town of Enterprise was founded. When the county was first formed, Joseph became the interim county seat. However, Enterprise was selected as the permanent county seat of Wallowa County in 1888.

Originally, the Wallowa County government rented office space on the second floor of a building on Main Street in Enterprise. In 1898, citizens proposed building a courthouse, but county officials decided it was cheaper to continue renting office space. A decade later, county officials finally decided to build a permanent court building to house county offices. Local citizens contribute $5,000 for construction of the courthouse, but refused to pay until construction reached the second story, ensuring that the courthouse would actually be built as promised by county officials. The contributors also insisted that the total cost of the courthouse be at least $25,000 to ensure the structure would be a well-built landmark for the community.

The courthouse was designed by Calvin R. Thornton, an architect from La Grande, Oregon. The construction contract was won by S. R. Haworth for $31,300. Haworth began work on the building in January 1909. The plumbing and heating work was done under a separate sub-contractor, costing an additional $4,592. Thornton moved to Enterprise to supervise to the courthouse construction. However, he was killed in December 1909 when he fell from a scaffold at another job site in Enterprise. As a result, he never saw the finished courthouse. In March 1910, a local furniture company was awarded a $3,183 contract to provide furniture, counters, and bar railings to finish the courthouse. The courthouse opened for business on 5 January 1910. However, construction was not actually completed until May of that year.

Over the years, minor modifications have been made to the courthouse building. For example, the original boiler was replaced in 1927. In the 1970s, several window air conditioning units were installed. Aluminum storm doors were added to the front and rear entrances in 1981. This was accomplished without altering the original wooden entry doors. A concrete handicap-accessible ramp was also added to rear entrance in 1981. Other changes made over the years include adding partitions and paneling, installing carpet, lowered ceiling, and added fluorescent lights.

Because the Wallowa County courthouse is one of the few early 20th century county government building in eastern Oregon that has retained its original character, it was listed in the National Register of Historic Places on 14 July 2000. Today, the courthouse is still being used for its original purpose.

== Structure ==
The Wallowa County courthouse is an imposing stone structure, built in center of Courthouse Square with the main facade facing west. The courthouse was built in the High Victorian style with massive stone facades on all four sides. The building has some Queen Anne elements, such as multiple roof forms, segmental windows arches, and patterned shingles. The courthouse is three stories high including a usable attic. The courthouse also has a full basement. It has a rectangular footprint measuring 92 feet (28 m) (east–west) by 76 feet (23 m) (north–south). The top of the cupola is 65 feet (20 m) above ground level.

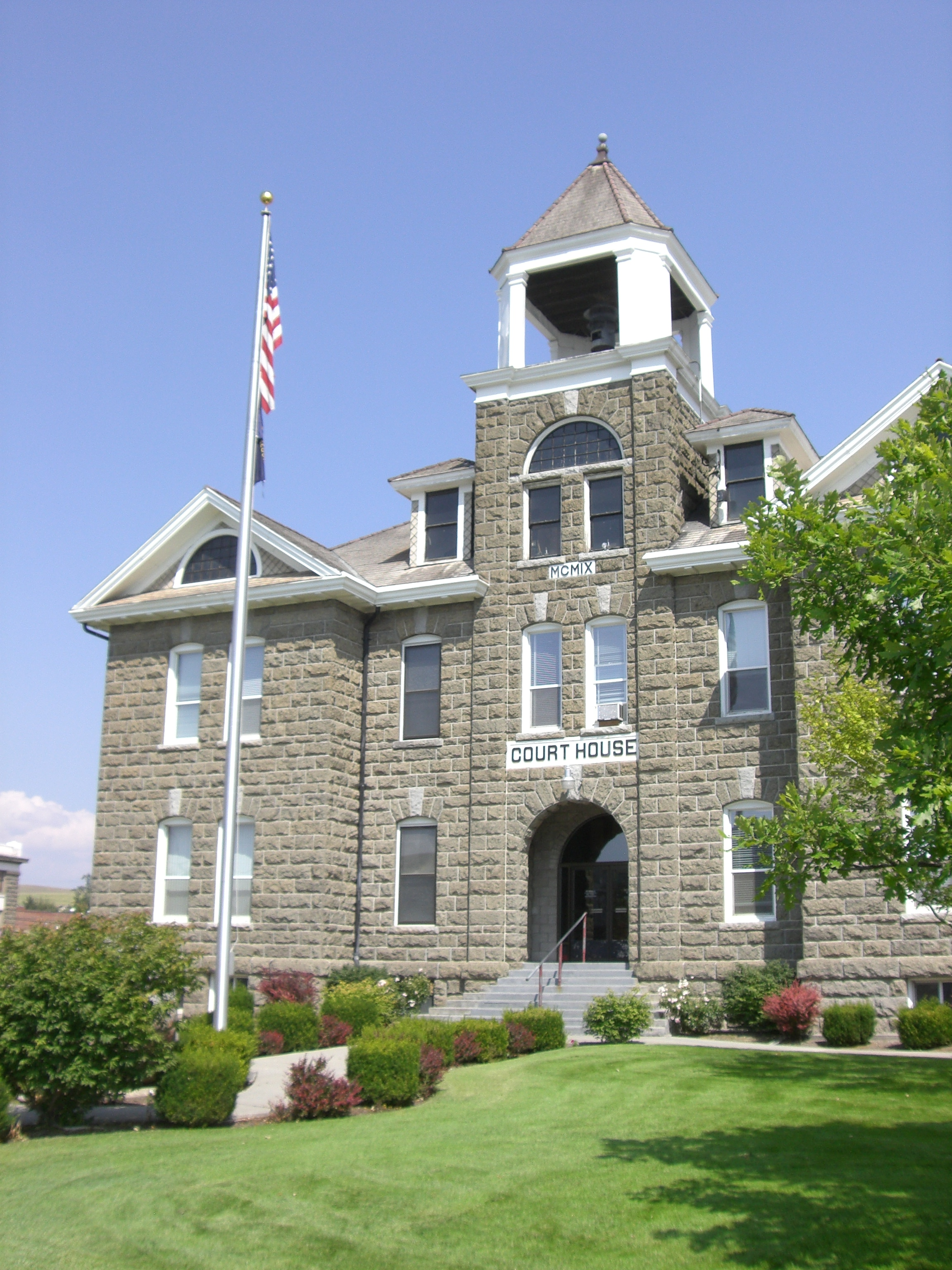
Wallowa County Courthouse main entrance

The perimeter foundation and exterior walls are made of rough-cut Bowlby stone, a type of volcanic tuff. The gray-brown stone was locally quarried. The stone walls are true load-bearing walls. There are stone arches above the windows and main entry doors. The arch keystones and window sills are light gray granite. The courthouse windows are double-hung, one-over-one style in wooden frames. They are arranged in pairs and symmetrically placed on all sides of the building. Some of the original wooden sashes have been replaced by modern vinyl sashes; however, the frames are still intact. In the 1970s, aluminum storm windows were mounted over all the windows. Five first floor windows at the southeast corner of the building have steel bars and are covered with woven wire mesh. This is the exterior of the men's jail. Originally, there were five barred windows on the northeast corner of the building, where the women's jail was located. However, the bars were removed in 1997 when women's cells were removed.

There are concrete steps leading up to the front and rear entrances. A concrete wheelchair ramp was added at the east entrance in 1981. Both the front and rear entrances have double doors recessed under an entry arch. The doors have glazed beveled-glass inset windows. There are clear beveled-glass sidelights flanking the entry doors with floral-patterned glass transoms above the each entrance.

The basement floor is concrete. The first and second story floors are supported by wood beams with wood sub-floors covered by fir floor boards. The load bearing walls on the first and second floors are brick with a plaster finish. Non-load bearing walls and stairs are wood-frame. The hip-roof is wood-frame except for the roof over the court room which is supported by two massive trusses. The trusses carry a pyramid-shaped coffered ceiling that is currently hidden by a modern suspended ceiling. The portion of the roof visible from the street is covered with asbestos tiles that are a charcoal gray color. Beyond the visible roof is another lesser pitched hip-roof covered with asphalt roofing. The courthouse has a white decorative cornice made of sheet-metal running along the perimeter of the building. The building has three brick chimneys. One chimney is in the center of the roof. The other two are above the east facade on a gabled roof extension. The courthouse cupola is a wood-framed element with sheet metal detailing that crowns the structure. There is round metal finial on top of the cupola.

== Interior ==
The courthouse has a usable basement, two main floors, and an attic. Originally, there were county offices on all four floors. Today, the courthouse continues to serve its original purpose with offices in the basement, first, and second floors while the attic is now used for storage.

The basement has a main hallway with stone-walls runs north to south. The basement walls are a finished rough stone. The ceilings are low with exposed mechanical systems visible in the hallway and office spaces. A small bathroom is located at the north end of the hall. Until the 1970s, there was a basement apartment for the courthouse custodian, who maintained the building, stoked the boiler, and cooked for prisoners housed in the county jail. The mechanical room houses an abandon steam boiler along with a new boiler that heats the building through the building's original radiator system. An exterior stairwell entrance was added in the 1960s.

The public entrances to the courthouse are on the first floor. The double doors at the main entrance on the west façade open to a wide hallway that runs the length of the building to double doors at the rear entrance. There is also a north–south hallway that divides the first floor into office quadrants. The hallway ceiling is 10 feet (3.0 m) high. A staircase at each end of the north–south leads to the basement and the second floor. All the interior office doors are original except for the sheriff's office, which has a new steel security door. There are bathrooms at the north and south ends of hall.

The northwest quadrant of the first floor houses the county clerk's office. The clerk's area includes a main office, a research room, and a vault. The northeast quadrant houses the sheriff's office. It includes offices for the sheriff and deputy sheriffs along with a reception area. The northeast corner of the building originally had a women's jail; however, the cells were removed in 1997 and the area was converted into office space. The jail and the treasurer's office are located in the southeast quadrant. The original cells remain intact, but are only used to temporary hold prisoners who are being booked or who are making a court appearance. The treasurer's office suite includes the treasurer's office and a reception area. The southwest quadrant houses offices for the Veteran's Administration and the county assessor.

The second floor has a single hallway, running north–south. There are offices on the west side of that hall with the county's courtroom and court offices on the east side of the hall. The second floor has a small bathroom at each end of the hall. The offices on the west side of the hall include the county commissioner's offices, county administrative offices, the district attorney's offices, a jury room, and a children services office. On the east side of the hall is a large courtroom. The courtroom has a double-door entrance. There are six windows opposite the entrance. An oak balustrade divides the courtroom into two sections, separating the judge, attorneys, and jury from the public seating area. The public area is surrounded by wooden bookshelves. The jury box has 12 oak chairs. The judge's and attorney's desks are made of oak, and are original courthouse furnishings. The courtroom originally had a coffered ceiling, but it has been covered by a modern drop-down ceiling. The court offices consist of three interconnected rooms, a reception office, an administrative office, and the judge's chambers, which is located on the northeast corner of the building.

The stairs to the attic is located at the south end of the second floor hall. The stairway was originally open, but a door was installed in 1981 to control access. The attic was originally used for office space. However, the offices were closed in the 1970s because fire exits were inadequate. The attic is now only used for storage. The attic area above the courtroom houses a massive truss system that supports the courtroom's original coffered ceiling. The attic's dormers and windows were built to for their exterior effect, not for interior lighting.

== Courthouse Square ==
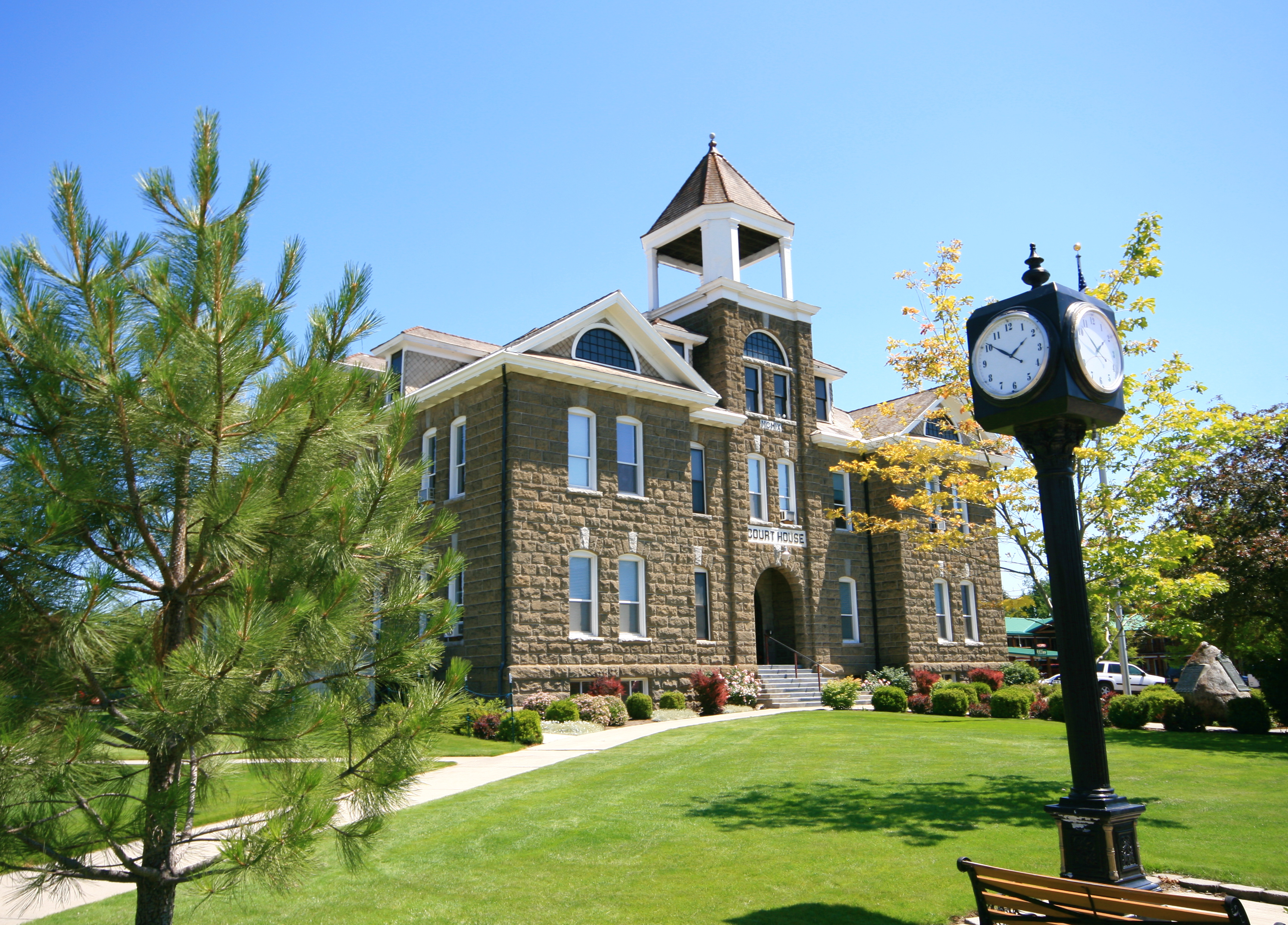
Courthouse Square surrounds the courthouse building

The Wallowa County courthouse is located at 101 South River Street in Enterprise, Oregon. The courthouse is surrounded by Courthouse Square which encompasses one city block, approximately 1.3 acres (0.53 ha). The courthouse faces west toward South River Street with East Main Street bordering the north side of Courthouse Square. First Street runs parallel to the rear to the courthouse building to the east of the site, and East Greenwood Street borders the south side of the square.

Originally, the courthouse was surrounded by deciduous trees, but they were replaced in 1925 with spruce trees. The spruce trees were removed in 1989 after several were damaged during a storm. The spruce trees were replaced by oak, pine, maple, linden, juniper, and flowering crab apple trees. There are roses planted on the north, west, and south sides of the courthouse. There is a 20-by-24-foot (6.1 m × 7.3 m) wood-framed gazebo in the northeast corner of Courthouse Square. The gazebo was built in 1986 by the Rotary Club of Wallowa County. It stands on the same location as a gazebo built about 1900. The date the original gazebo was removed is unknown. However, it can be seen in photographs that were taken shortly after the courthouse was built.

There are a number of memorials around Courthouse Square. On the northwest corner of the square stands a concrete arch that is dedicated to the early pioneers of Wallowa County, who arrived in the 1870s. The local American Legion post placed the 7,710-kilogram (7.59-long-ton; 8.50-short-ton) granite boulder in front of the courthouse in 1925. The bronze plaque mounted on the boulder bears the names of Wallowa County men killed in World War I. In 1985, two more plaques were added to honor those killed during World War II, the Korean War, and the Vietnam War. A World War I field gun was placed in the square in 1926. However, the gun was melted down during a World War II scrap drive to support the war effort. It was replaced in 1947 with a World War II Howitzer that honors American veterans. A Fountain of Honor honoring all veterans of the United States armed forces was dedicated on 9 July 2011.

== See also ==
- National Register of Historic Places listings in Wallowa County, Oregon
