= Forest Service Guard Station =

A United States Forest Service Guard Station is an administrative building located in a National Forest in the United States which is not at the same location as the District Ranger's headquarters (the Ranger Station). They usually have office and workshop space, tool storage and often sleeping quarters. Fire, trail, road and other work crews are frequently stationed at these sites during busy times of the year.

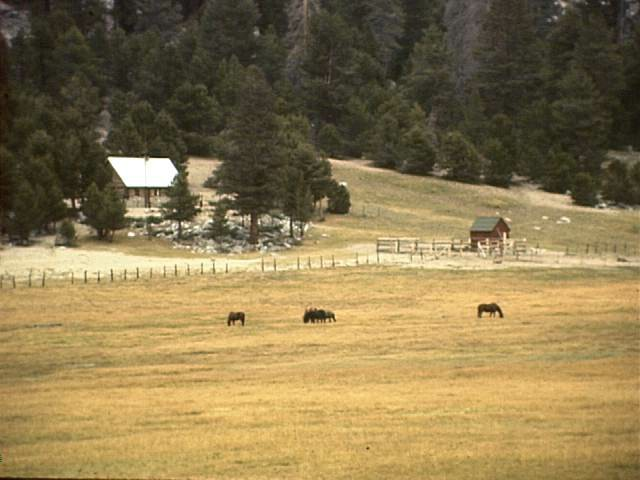
Casa Vieja Guard Station, Golden Trout Wilderness, Inyo National Forest, Mount Whitney Ranger District, circa 1976. Built in 1959.

== History ==
In the 1920s and 1930s, Forest Service employees often traveled many miles from local ranger stations to forest work sites. Since the forest road networks were not well developed, getting to a job site meant a long trek, carrying all the equipment needed to perform the field work. This made it impractical for employees to make daily round trips. To facilitate work at remote sites, the Forest Service built guard stations at strategic locations throughout the forest to house fire patrols and project crews.

After World War II, the Forest Service greatly expanded its road network, allowing employees to get to most National Forest areas within a few hours. As a result, many guard stations lost their utility. The Forest Service found new uses for some stations, but many were demolished or abandoned. In the 1990s, historic preservation groups with the support of Forest Service employees began pressing National Forest managers to preserve the remaining structures. To finance the preservation effort the Forest Service started renting some guard stations to the public.
