= Enterprise, Oregon =

- City
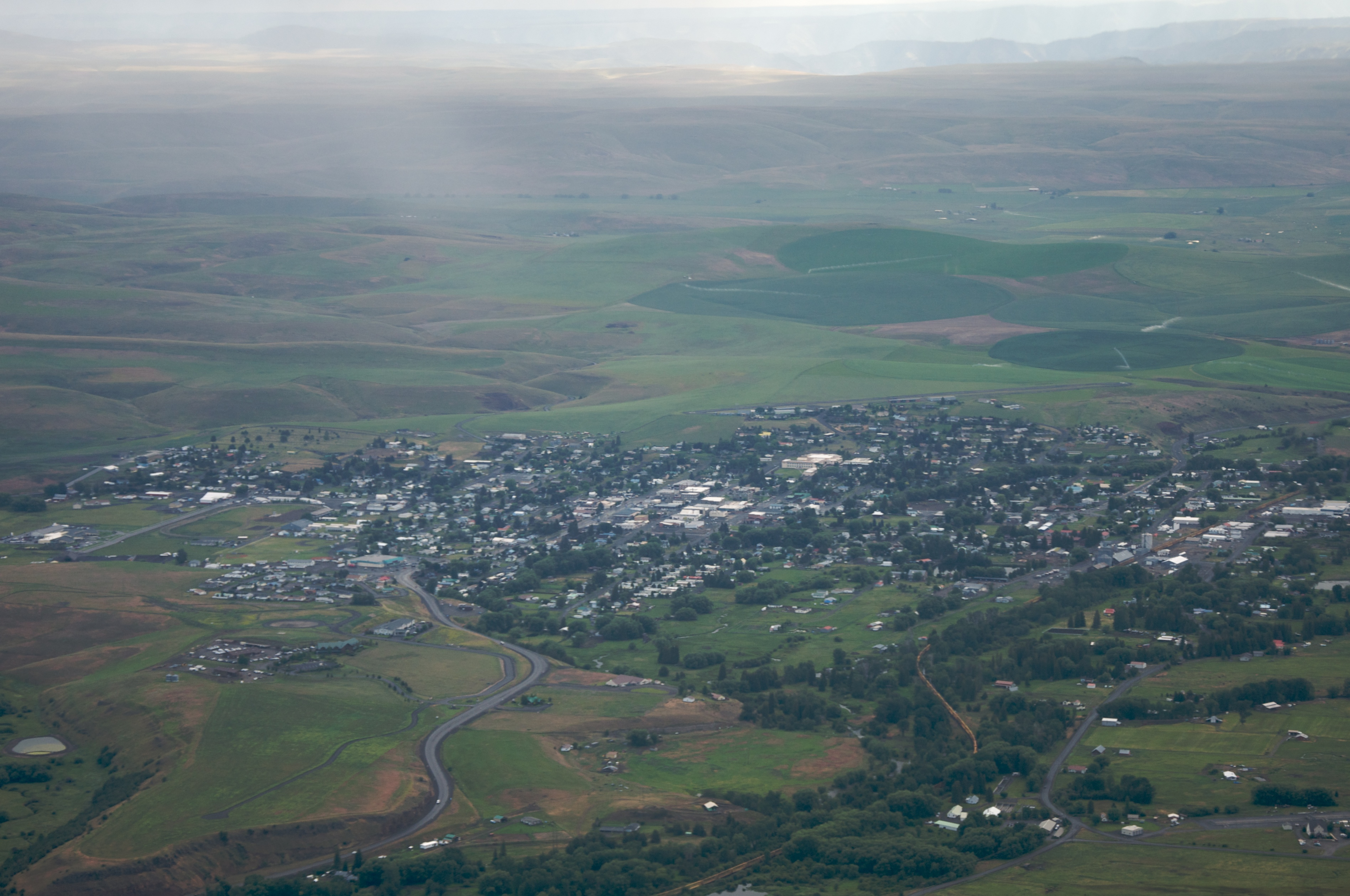
- Aerial view of Enterprise

- Location in Oregon
- Coordinates: 45°25′32″N 117°16′44″W
- Country: United States
- State: Oregon
- County: Wallowa
- Incorporated: 1889

Area
  - Total: 1.47 sq mi (3.80 km^{2})
  - Land: 1.47 sq mi (3.80 km^{2})
  - Water: 0 sq mi (0.00 km^{2})
- Elevation: 3,753 ft (1,144 m)

Population (2020)
  - Total: 2,052
  - Density: 1,398.6/sq mi (540.02/km^{2})
- Time zone: UTC−8 (Pacific)
  - Summer (DST): UTC−7 (Pacific)
- ZIP code: 97828
- Area codes: 458 and 541
- FIPS code: 41-23500
- GNIS feature ID: 2410445
- Website: www.enterpriseoregon.org

Enterprise is a city in Wallowa County, Oregon. Enterprise serves as Wallowa County's county seat. As of the 2020 census, Enterprise had a population of 2,052.

== History ==
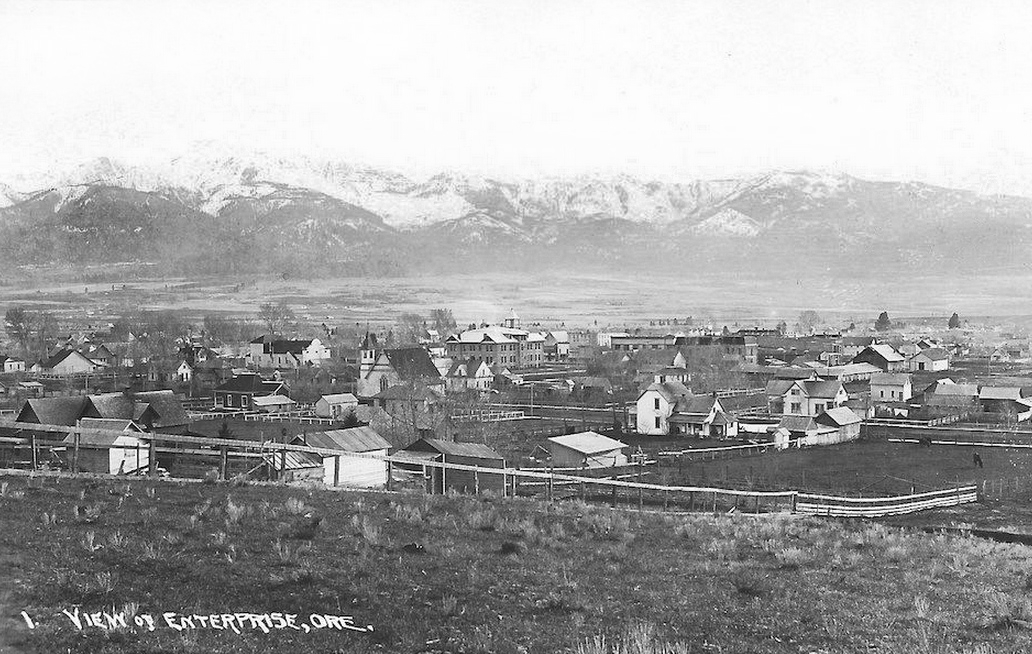
Enterprise, c.1912

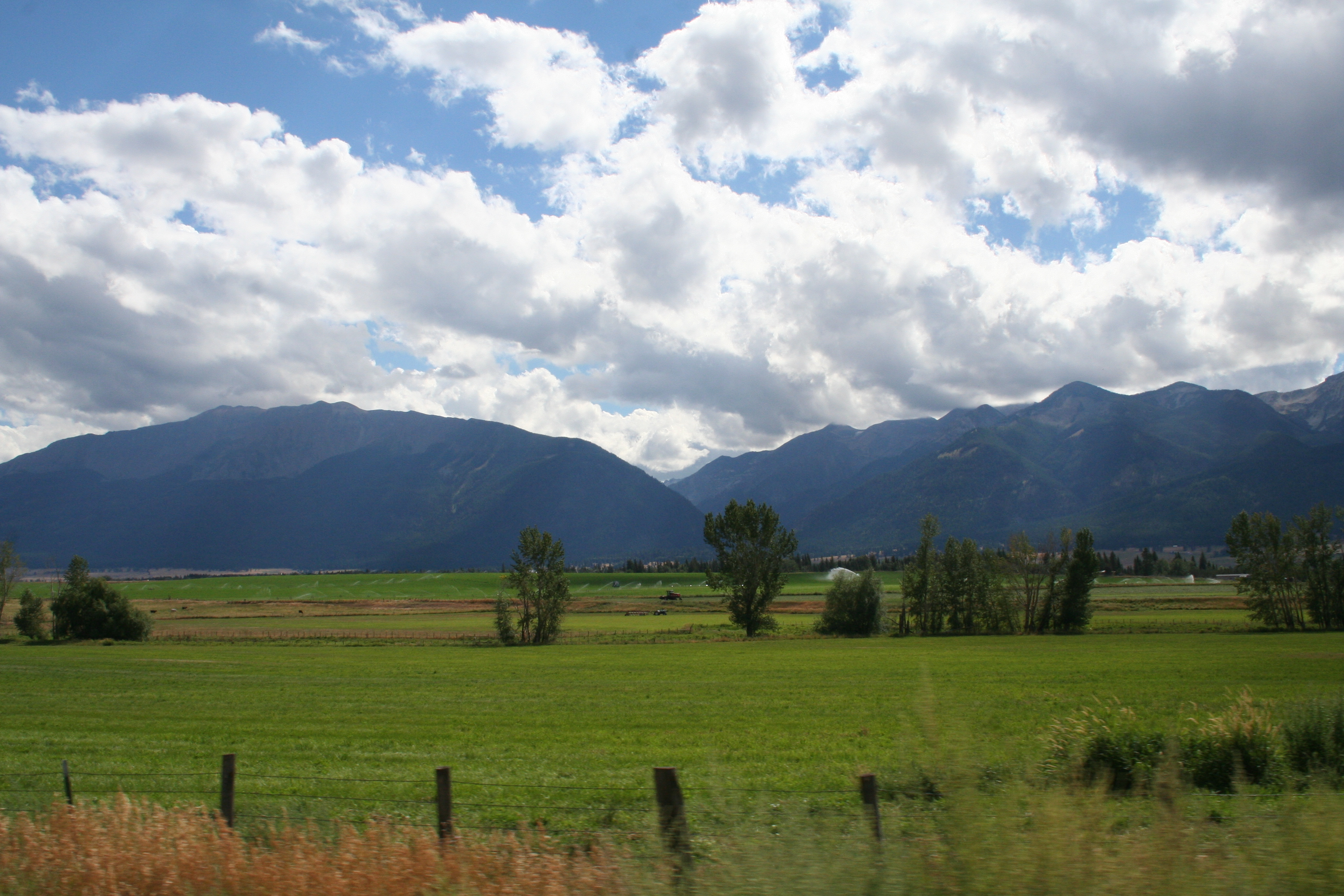
Near Enterprise, Oregon

Enterprise was platted in 1886, and in 1887 residents considered Bennett Flat, Wallowa City, Franklin, and other possibilities before voting for Enterprise during a community meeting in a tent owned by a mercantile company. The name was meant to reflect "the policy of its inhabitants". In November 1887, a post office was established in the community, and Catherine Akin became the first postmaster. The city was incorporated by the Oregon Legislative Assembly on February 21, 1889.

== Geography ==
According to the United States Census Bureau, the city has a total area of 1.53 square miles (3.96 km^{2}), all of it land.

== Demographics ==
Historical population
Census	Pop.	Note	%±
1890	242		—
1900	396		63.6%
1910	1,242		213.6%
1920	1,895		52.6%
1930	1,379		−27.2%
1940	1,709		23.9%
1950	1,718		0.5%
1960	1,932		12.5%
1970	1,680		−13.0%
1980	2,003		19.2%
1990	1,905		−4.9%
2000	1,895		−0.5%
2010	1,940		2.4%
2020	2,052		5.8%
U.S. Decennial Census

=== 2020 census ===
As of the 2020 census, Enterprise had a population of 2,052. The median age was 43.6 years. 22.9% of residents were under the age of 18 and 24.8% of residents were 65 years of age or older. For every 100 females there were 93.2 males, and for every 100 females age 18 and over there were 94.0 males age 18 and over.

The 2020 census reported that 0% of residents lived in urban areas, while 100.0% lived in rural areas.

There were 909 households in Enterprise, of which 26.6% had children under the age of 18 living in them. Of all households, 44.2% were married-couple households, 20.2% were households with a male householder and no spouse or partner present, and 27.8% were households with a female householder and no spouse or partner present. About 35.1% of all households were made up of individuals and 15.7% had someone living alone who was 65 years of age or older.

There were 986 housing units, of which 7.8% were vacant. Among occupied housing units, 66.1% were owner-occupied and 33.9% were renter-occupied. The homeowner vacancy rate was 1.6% and the rental vacancy rate was 3.4%.

Racial composition as of the 2020 census
Race	Number	Percent
White	1,833	89.3%
Black or African American	6	0.3%
American Indian and Alaska Native	20	1.0%
Asian	7	0.3%
Native Hawaiian and Other Pacific Islander	3	0.1%
Some other race	40	1.9%
Two or more races	143	7.0%
Hispanic or Latino (of any race)	91	4.4%

=== 2010 census ===
As of the census of 2010, there were 1,940 people, 871 households, and 522 families residing in the city. The population density was 1,268.0 inhabitants per square mile (489.6/km^{2}). There were 965 housing units at an average density of 630.7 per square mile (243.5/km^{2}). The racial makeup of the city was 95.9% White, 0.3% African American, 0.6% Native American, 0.5% Asian, 0.1% Pacific Islander, 0.5% from other races, and 2.2% from two or more races. Hispanic or Latino of any race were 3.1% of the population.

There were 871 households, of which 24.8% had children under the age of 18 living with them, 47.1% were married couples living together, 9.1% had a female householder with no husband present, 3.8% had a male householder with no wife present, and 40.1% were non-families. 34.6% of all households were made up of individuals, and 13.9% had someone living alone who was 65 years of age or older. The average household size was 2.17 and the average family size was 2.78.

The median age in the city was 46 years. 21.2% of residents were under the age of 18; 5.9% were between the ages of 18 and 24; 21.8% were from 25 to 44; 29.5% were from 45 to 64; and 21.6% were 65 years of age or older. The gender makeup of the city was 48.1% male and 51.9% female.

=== 2000 census ===
As of the census of 2000, there were 1,895 people, 821 households, and 522 families residing in the city. The population density was 1,289.7 inhabitants per square mile (498.0/km^{2}). There were 952 housing units at an average density of 647.9 per square mile (250.2/km^{2}). The racial makeup of the city was 96.46% White, 0.05% African American, 0.95% Native American, 0.32% Asian, 1.06% from other races, and 1.16% from two or more races. Hispanic or Latino of any race were 1.64% of the population.

There were 821 households, out of which 28.6% had children under the age of 18 living with them, 50.8% were married couples living together, 8.8% had a female householder with no husband present, and 36.4% were non-families. 32.0% of all households were made up of individuals, and 13.9% had someone living alone who was 65 years of age or older. The average household size was 2.23 and the average family size was 2.80.

In the city, the population was spread out, with 24.3% under the age of 18, 5.2% from 18 to 24, 22.5% from 25 to 44, 27.1% from 45 to 64, and 20.9% who were 65 years of age or older. The median age was 44 years. For every 100 females, there were 95.6 males. For every 100 females age 18 and over, there were 91.1 males.

The median income for a household in the city was $31,429, and the median income for a family was $39,338. Males had a median income of $29,688 versus $22,232 for females. The per capita income for the city was $16,755. About 6.7% of families and 11.3% of the population were below the poverty line, including 13.6% of those under age 18 and 7.4% of those age 65 or over.

== Climate ==
Enterprise has a humid continental climate (Köppen Climate Classification Dfb), one of the less common climate types in Oregon.

On June 11, 1968, an F2 tornado hit Wallowa County, north of Enterprise. The tornado cut a path between 8 mi (13 km) and 10 miles (16 km) long, and between 0.5 miles (0.8 km) and 2 miles (3 km) wide. About 1,800 acres (728 ha) of prime timber were destroyed, with an estimated loss of between 5 and 50 million dollars.

Climate data for Enterprise
Month	Jan	Feb	Mar	Apr	May	Jun	Jul	Aug	Sep	Oct	Nov	Dec	Year
Record high °F (°C)	61 (16)	66 (19)	78 (26)	91 (33)	96 (36)	101 (38)	107 (42)	105 (41)	98 (37)	90 (32)	71 (22)	63 (17)	107 (42)
Mean daily maximum °F (°C)	33.9 (1.1)	40.0 (4.4)	47.3 (8.5)	56.7 (13.7)	65.5 (18.6)	72.3 (22.4)	82.9 (28.3)	82.1 (27.8)	73.3 (22.9)	61.2 (16.2)	45.3 (7.4)	36.5 (2.5)	58.1 (14.5)
Daily mean °F (°C)	23.9 (−4.5)	29.3 (−1.5)	35.2 (1.8)	42.8 (6.0)	50.2 (10.1)	56.1 (13.4)	62.9 (17.2)	61.3 (16.3)	54.2 (12.3)	45.2 (7.3)	33.8 (1.0)	27.0 (−2.8)	43.5 (6.4)
Mean daily minimum °F (°C)	13.9 (−10.1)	18.6 (−7.4)	23.0 (−5.0)	28.9 (−1.7)	34.8 (1.6)	39.9 (4.4)	42.8 (6.0)	40.4 (4.7)	35.1 (1.7)	29.1 (−1.6)	22.3 (−5.4)	17.5 (−8.1)	28.9 (−1.7)
Record low °F (°C)	−34 (−37)	−36 (−38)	−21 (−29)	0 (−18)	14 (−10)	22 (−6)	28 (−2)	23 (−5)	13 (−11)	0 (−18)	−22 (−30)	−32 (−36)	−36 (−38)
Average precipitation inches (mm)	.91 (23)	.70 (18)	.99 (25)	1.17 (30)	1.66 (42)	2.08 (53)	0.69 (18)	0.78 (20)	1.01 (26)	1.08 (27)	1.00 (25)	1.02 (26)	13.10 (333)
Average snowfall inches (cm)	10.9 (28)	7.5 (19)	7.0 (18)	2.2 (5.6)	0.4 (1.0)	0.1 (0.25)	0 (0)	0 (0)	0 (0)	0.8 (2.0)	4.7 (12)	7.9 (20)	41.6 (106)
Average precipitation days (≥ 0.01 in)	11	10	13	14	13	11	7	6	6	8	14	11	124
Source: WRCC, Weatherbase

== Economy ==
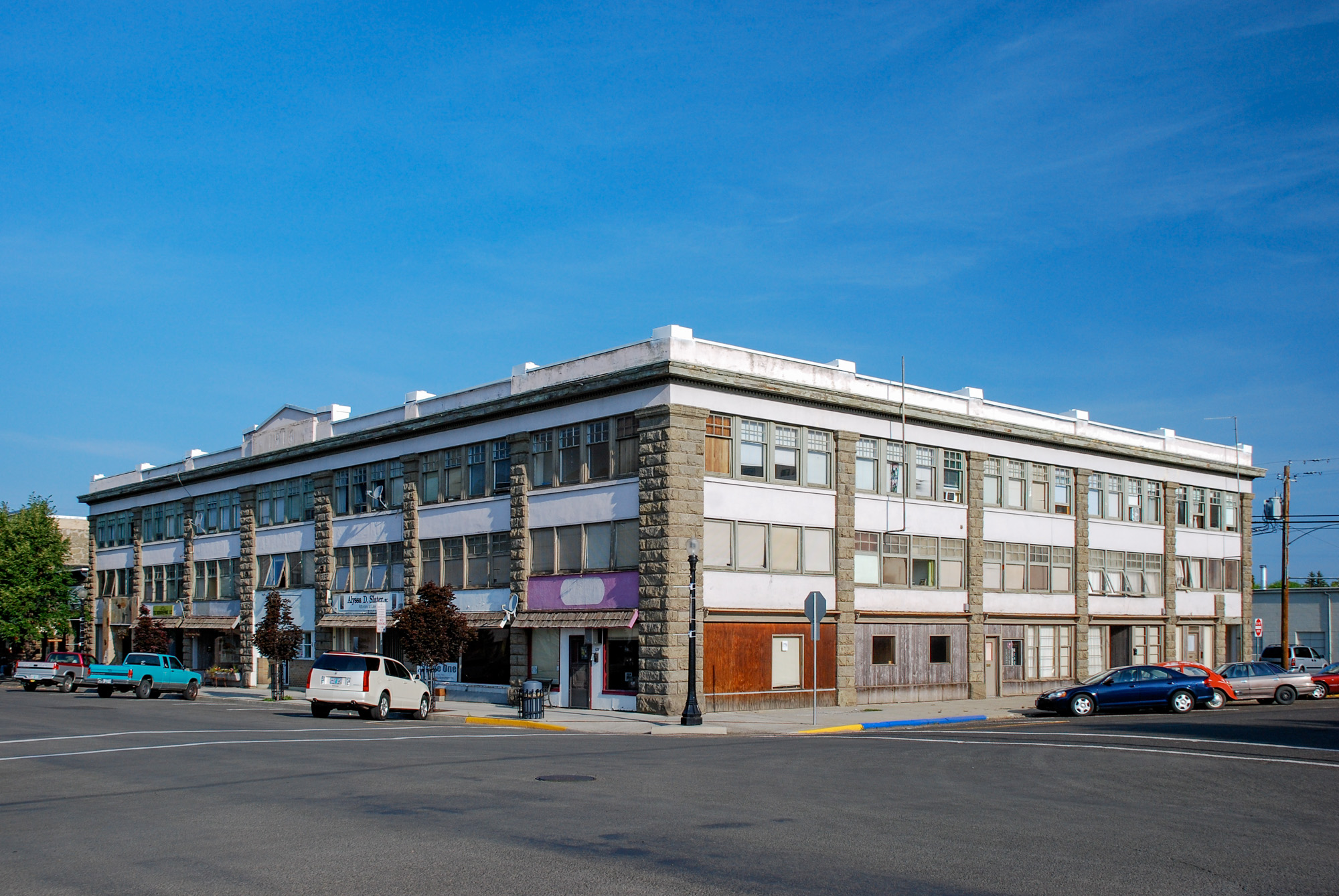
Building on E Main St., Enterprise, Oregon, across from the Wallowa County Courthouse

The Wallowa Memorial Hospital is a primary employer in the area. The healthcare sector employed approximately 200 people as of 2024.

Many cattlemen and farmers live in the Enterprise area, including representatives of the Oregon Cattleman's Association, the Wallowa County Stockgrowers, and other groups. Livestock continues to be the largest sector of Wallowa County's agricultural economy, which is vastly dominated by cattle. There are over 24,000 mother cows in the permanent herds, with an additional 8,000 cattle from other areas grazing for the summer. There is nearly 5,000 head of sheep that summer in the county. These operations produce over $17.9 million of farm gate sales. The crops portion of agriculture is much more diversified, with nearly 9,000 acres of wheat, 4,200 acres of barley, with nearly 29,000 acres of hay (alfalfa, grass, and grain) grown. Added to the incidental "tree farm" income, crops in Wallowa County produce over $25 million. The total agricultural farm gate sales for Wallowa County was $43,519,000 in 2007. Enterprise has several commercial greenhouses that sell nursery stock and numerous individuals within the local community also grow vegetables in private greenhouses. The organization of private growers into a brokerage is an ongoing project and several private growers feature their wares at the Enterprise Farmers Market every Saturday throughout the summer.

Two bronze foundries, Parks Bronze and TW Bronze, are situated in Enterprise. Numerous artists, craftsmen and musicians call Enterprise home.

== Education ==
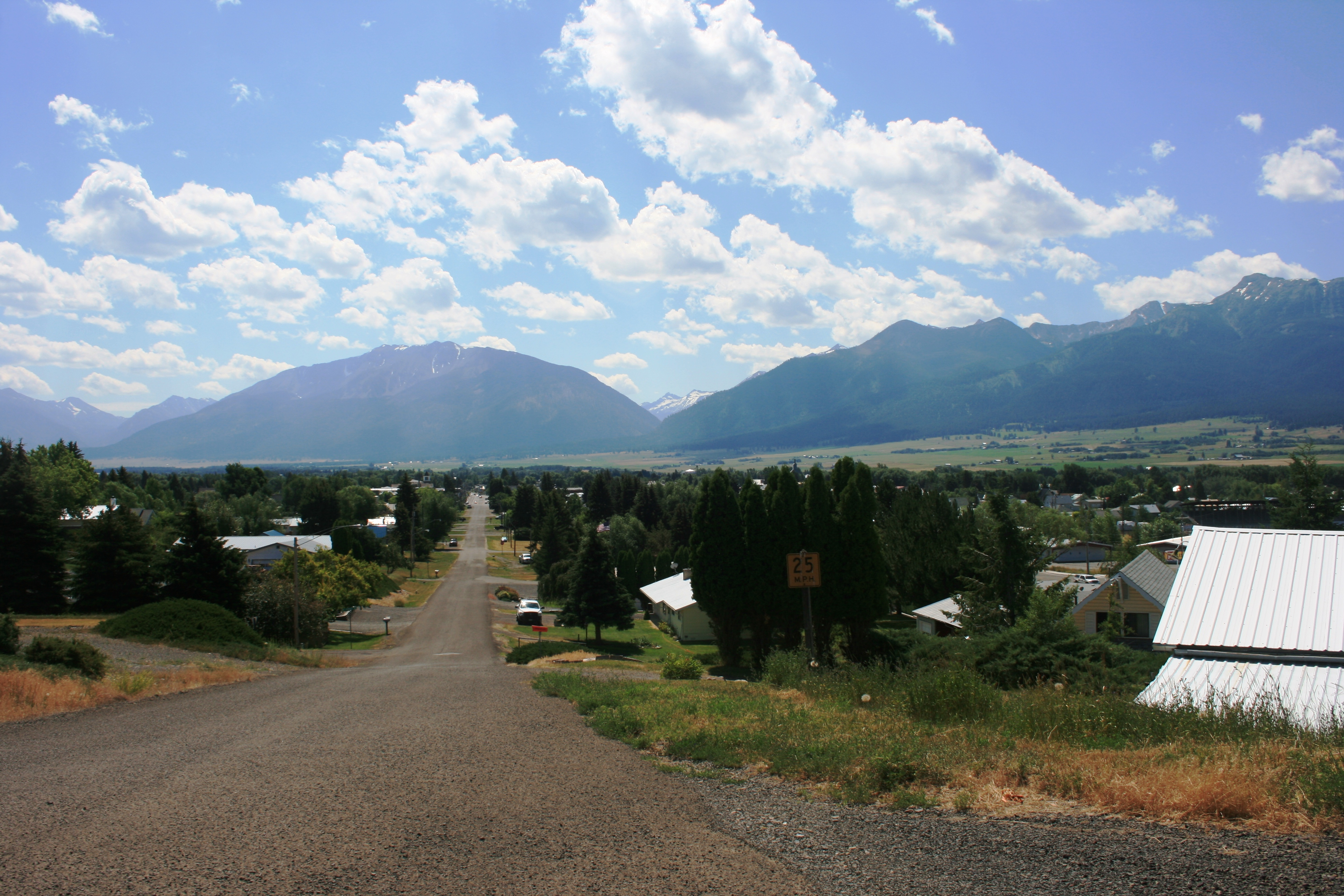
Enterprise with the Wallowa Mountains in the distance

It is in the Enterprise School District 21.

- Enterprise High School
- Enterprise Elementary School

== Media ==
- The Wallowa County Chieftain is the newspaper of record, in continuous publication since 1884.
- Wallowa Valley Online

=== Radio ===
- KWVR (AM) 1340
- KWVR-FM 92.1
- KWRL FM 102.3
- KCMB FM 104.7

== Infrastructure ==
=== Transportation ===
- Enterprise Municipal Airport

== Notable people ==
- William B. Ault, US Navy commander during World War II; posthumous recipient of the Navy Cross.
- Carol D'Onofrio, public health researcher (1936-2020). Grew up in Enterprise, Oregon.
- Dale T. Mortensen, awarded a Nobel Prize in Economics.
- Mike Rich, screenwriter.
- Blaine Stubblefield, founder of the annual National Oldtime Fiddlers' Contest
