= Sawtooth Peak (Oregon) =

Mountain peak in Oregon, United States

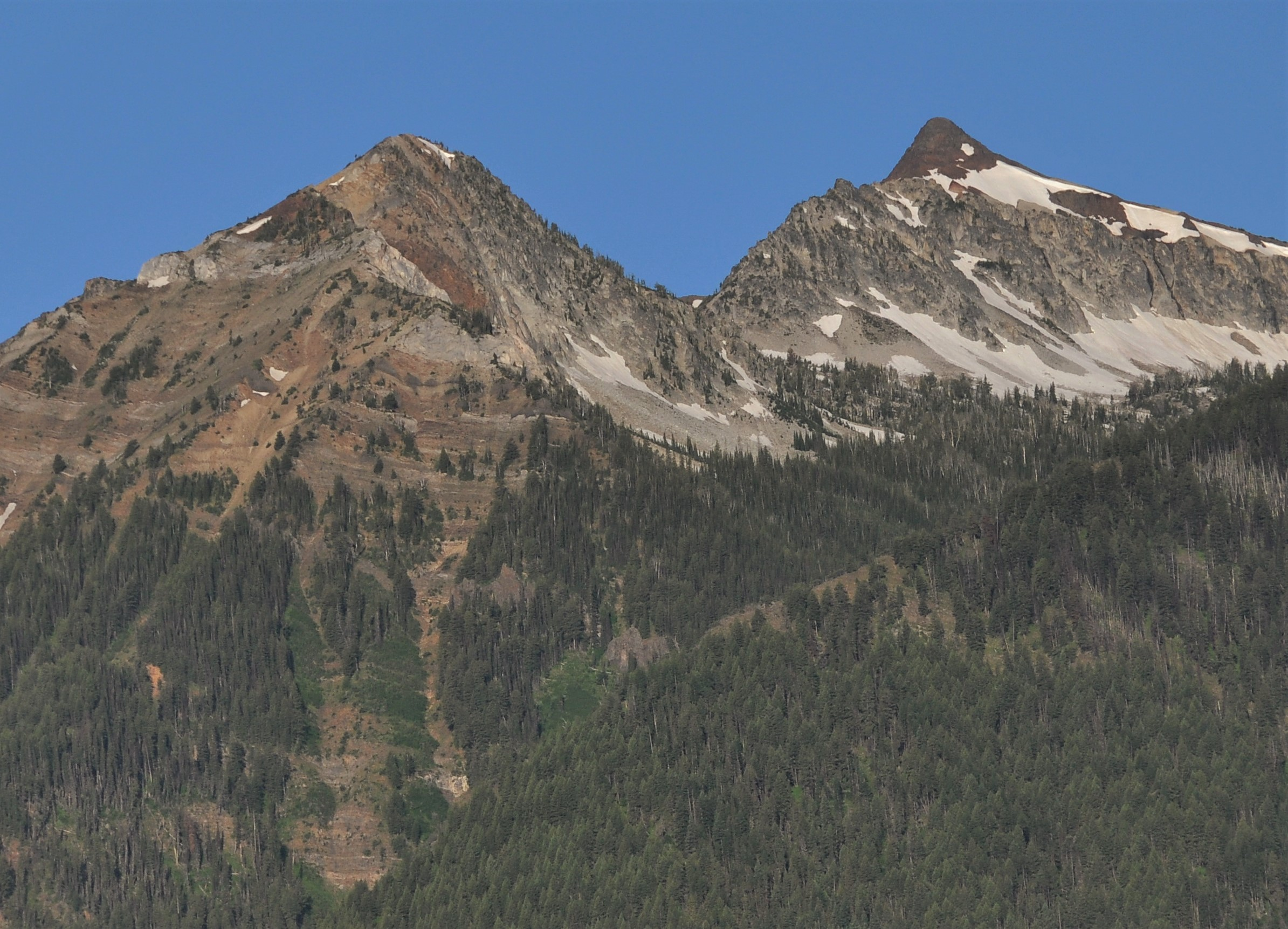
- Northeast aspect of Sawtooth Peak (right) (Peak 8585 to left)

Highest point
- Elevation: 9,179 ft (2,798 m)
- Prominence: 139 ft (42 m)
- Parent peak: Twin Peaks (9,673 ft)
- Isolation: 1.02 mi (1.64 km)
- Coordinates: 45°19′10″N 117°20′41″W

Geography
- Location within Oregon Location within the United States
- Location: Eagle Cap Wilderness
- Country: United States of America
- State: Oregon
- County: Wallowa
- Parent range: Wallowa Mountains
- Topo map: USGS Chief Joseph Mountain

Geology
- Rock age: Miocene
- Rock type(s): Columbia River basalt, granite

Climbing
- Easiest route: scrambling

Sawtooth Peak is a 9,179-foot elevation (2,798 m) mountain summit located in Wallowa County, Oregon, US.

== Description ==
Sawtooth Peak is located seven miles west-southwest of Joseph, Oregon, in the Wallowa Mountains. It is set within the Eagle Cap Wilderness on land managed by Wallowa–Whitman National Forest. The peak is situated one mile north of Legore Lake and line parent Twin Peaks. Precipitation runoff from the mountain drains into tributaries of the Lostine River and Wallowa River. Topographic relief is significant as the summit rises over 4,200 feet (1,300 meters) above Hurricane Creek in approximately two miles. The summit is composed of Columbia River basalt which overlays Mesozoic granite of the Wallowa Batholith. This landform's toponym has been officially adopted by the United States Board on Geographic Names.

== Climate ==
Based on the Köppen climate classification, Sawtooth Peak is located in a subarctic climate zone characterized by long, usually very cold winters, and mild summers. Winter temperatures can drop below −10 °F with wind chill factors below −20 °F. Most precipitation in the area is caused by orographic lift.

== See also ==
- List of mountain peaks of Oregon
