= Maxwell Lake =

Lake in Oregon, United States

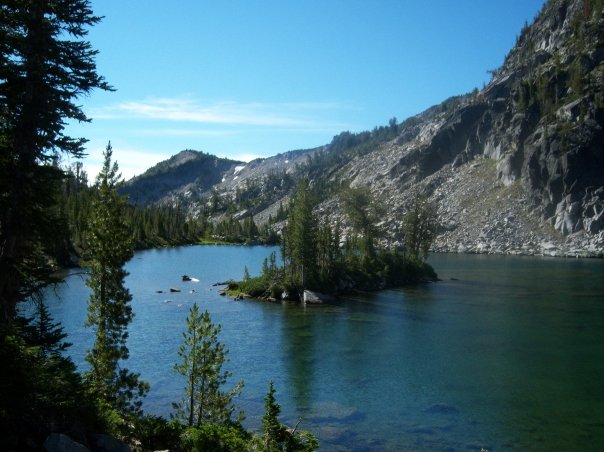
- East Side of Maxwell Lake

- Location within Oregon Location within the United States
- Location: Eagle Cap Wilderness, Wallowa County, Oregon, US
- Coordinates: 45.2532°N 117.4127°W
- Type: Tarn
- Basin countries: United States
- Max. length: 413 yd (378 m)
- Max. width: 277 yd (253 m)
- Surface elevation: 7,749 ft (2,362 m)
- Islands: East Island: Width: 13 yd (12 m) Length: 42 yd (38 m) West Island: Width: 10 yd (9.1 m) Length: 31 yd (28 m)

Maxwell Lake is a tarn located in the Eagle Cap Wilderness of Northeastern Oregon. It is situated near the North Minam Meadows and is 16 aerial miles from the town of Lostine, Oregon. It is known for its two small islands and typically successful fishing, which make it a popular day hiking and overnight backpacking destination. It is the 16th highest lake in the Eagle Cap Wilderness.

== Trail ==
Maxwell Lake is one of the few lakes in the Eagle Cap Wilderness that has an exclusive trail. The trail, which is named after the lake, has the trail number 1674. It is 4 miles long (one way) and the U.S. Forest Service lists it as "More difficult". Less than half a mile from the beginning the trail crosses a small bridge. The trail then begins to switchback for several miles, crossing Maxwell Creek. Here the trail has no bridge and the climber is forced to find another means to cross. Though somewhat shallow in the summer and fall, Maxwell Creek can be fairly deep in the spring time. The trail straightens for the last mile, but gains elevation quickly. This part of the trail may be difficult for some climbers.

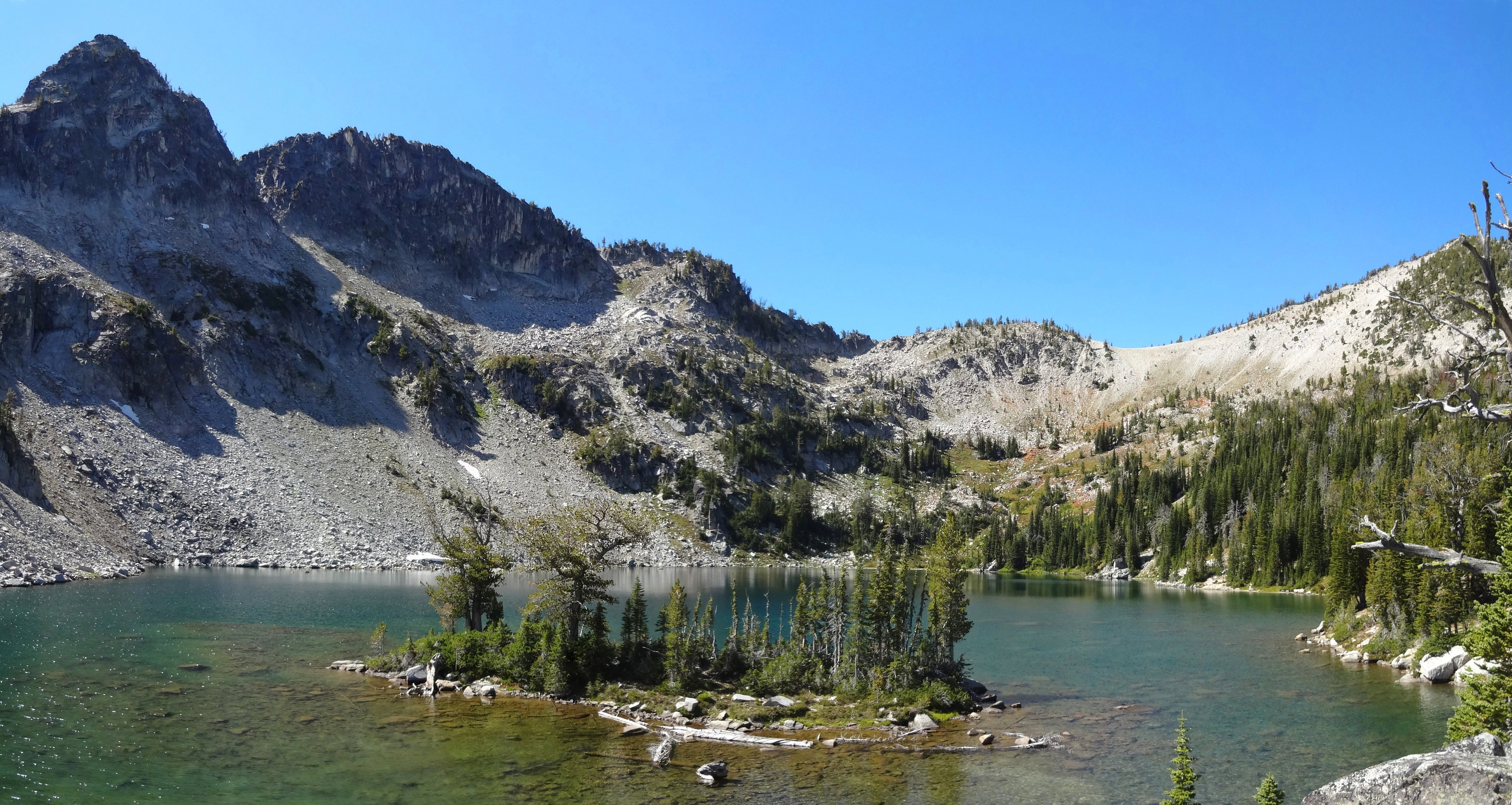

== Images ==
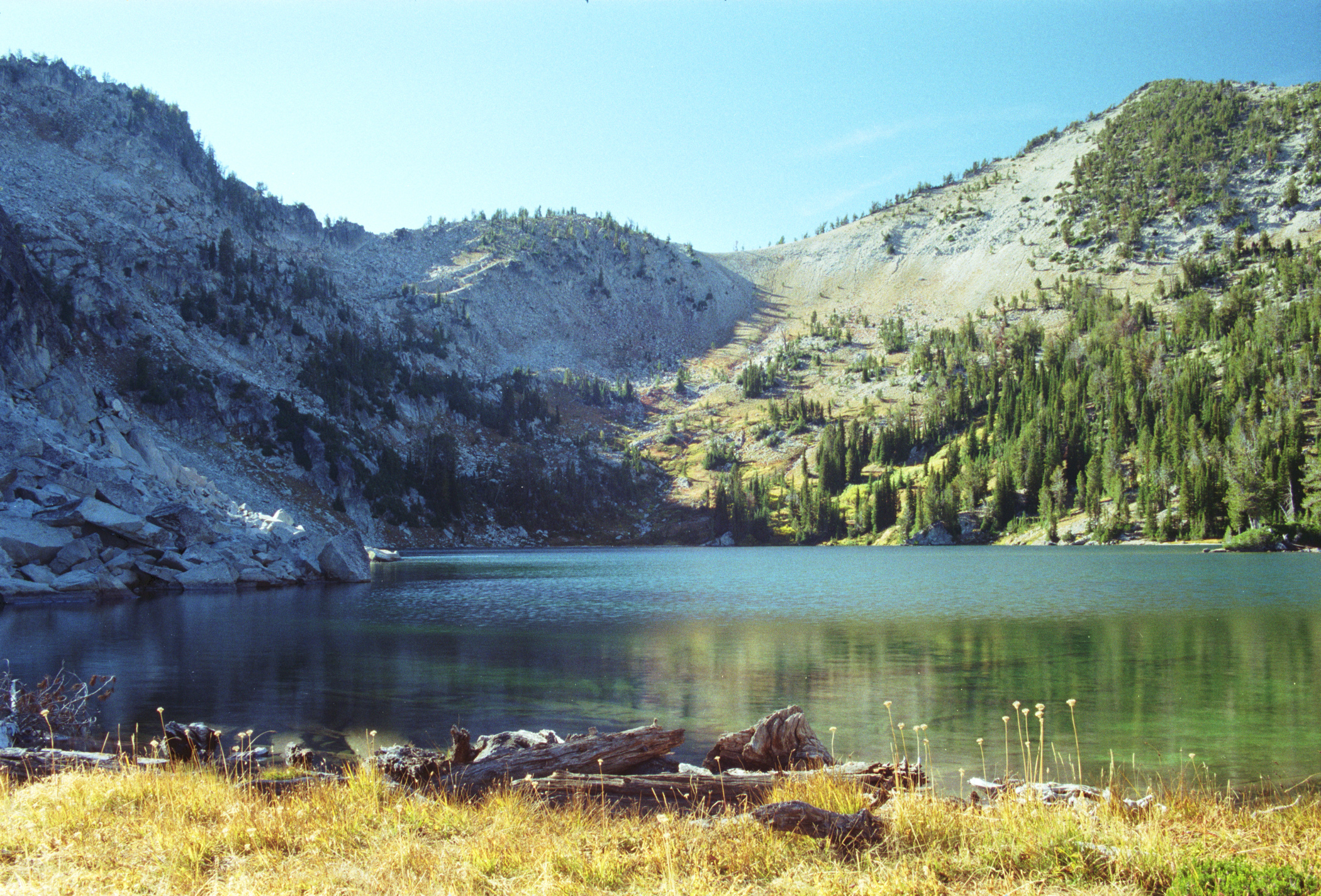
The West Side of Maxwell Lake

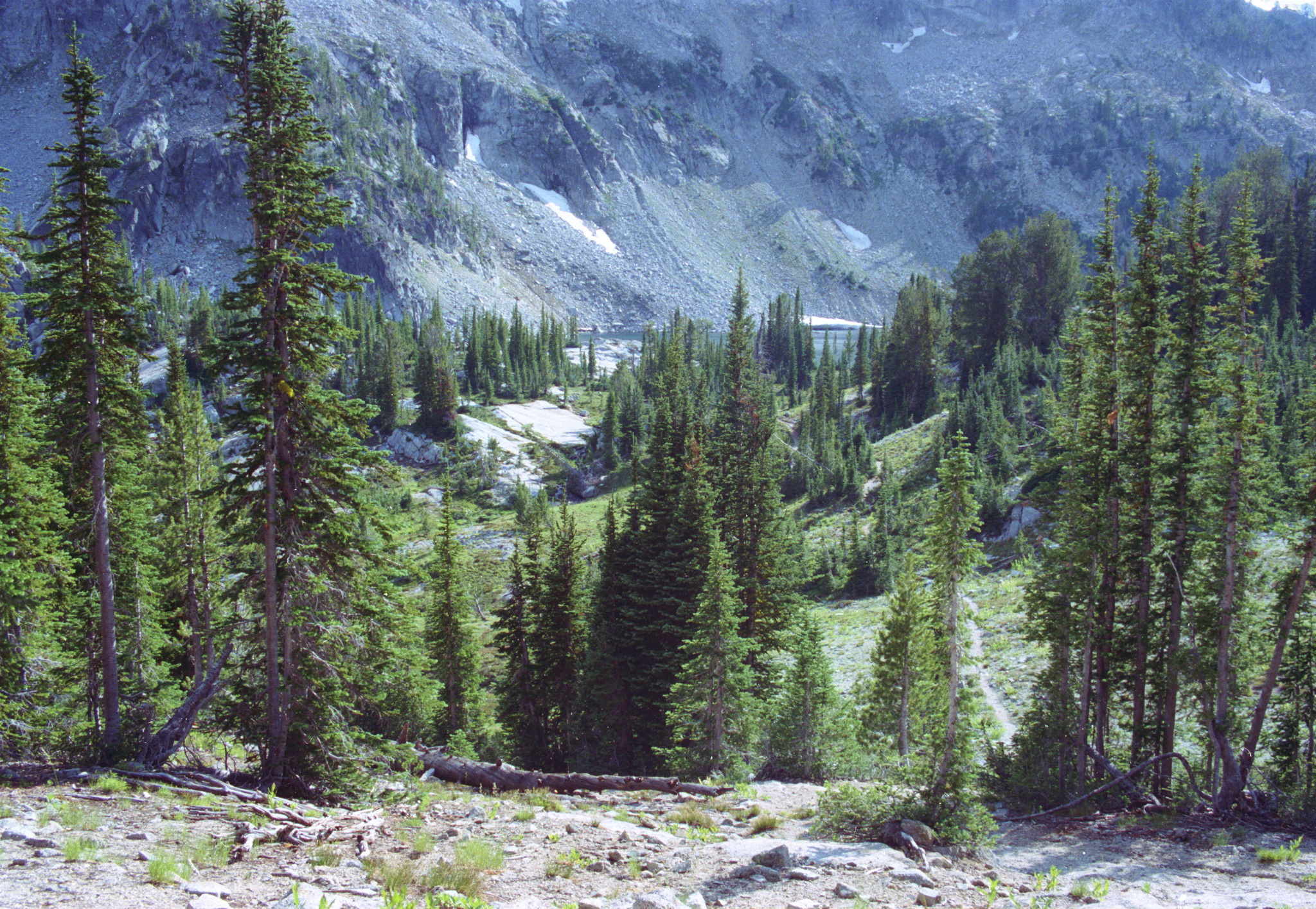
Maxwell Lake
