= Jones Lake =

Jones Lake may refer to:

- Wahleach Lake, also known as Jones Lake, in British Columbia, Canada
- Jones Lake (Greater Sudbury), Ontario
- Jones Lake (Algoma District), Ontario
- Jones Lake (Kenora District), Ontario
- Jones Lake (Timiskaming District), Ontario
- Jones Lake (Sudbury District), Ontario
- Jones Lake (Thunder Bay District), Ontario
- Jones Lake State Park, North Carolina, United States
- Billy Jones Lake, Northeastern Oregon, United States
- Jones Lake, an artificial lake in Centennial Park, Moncton, New Brunswick, Canada

== See also ==
- Carlton Jones Lake (died 1998), American choral conductor
- Lake Jones (1867–1930), United States federal judge
