= Twin Peaks (Oregon) =

Double summit of the Wallowa Mountains in Oregon, United States

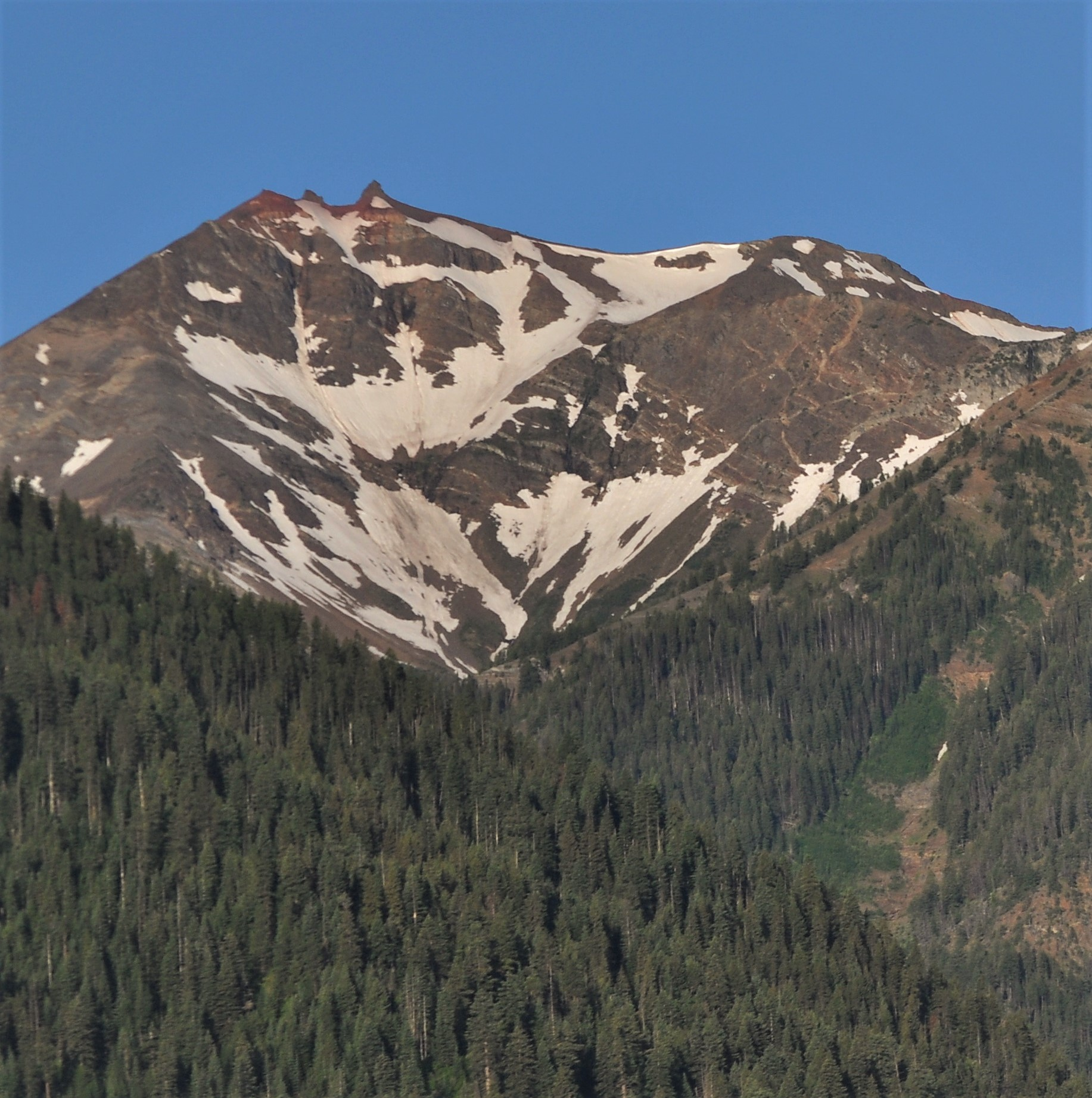
- Northeast aspect

Highest point
- Elevation: 9,609 ft (2,929 m)
- Prominence: 1,953 ft (595 m)
- Parent peak: Sacajawea Peak
- Isolation: 4.77 mi (7.68 km)
- Coordinates: 45°18′14″N 117°20′38″W

Geography
- Location within Oregon
- Location: Wallowa County, Oregon

Twin Peaks is a 9,609-foot (2,929 m) double summit of the Wallowa Mountains in Wallowa County, Oregon in the United States. It is located in the Eagle Cap Wilderness of the Wallowa National Forest. It is located seven miles southwest of Joseph, Oregon, and immediately south of Legore Lake and Sawtooth Peak.

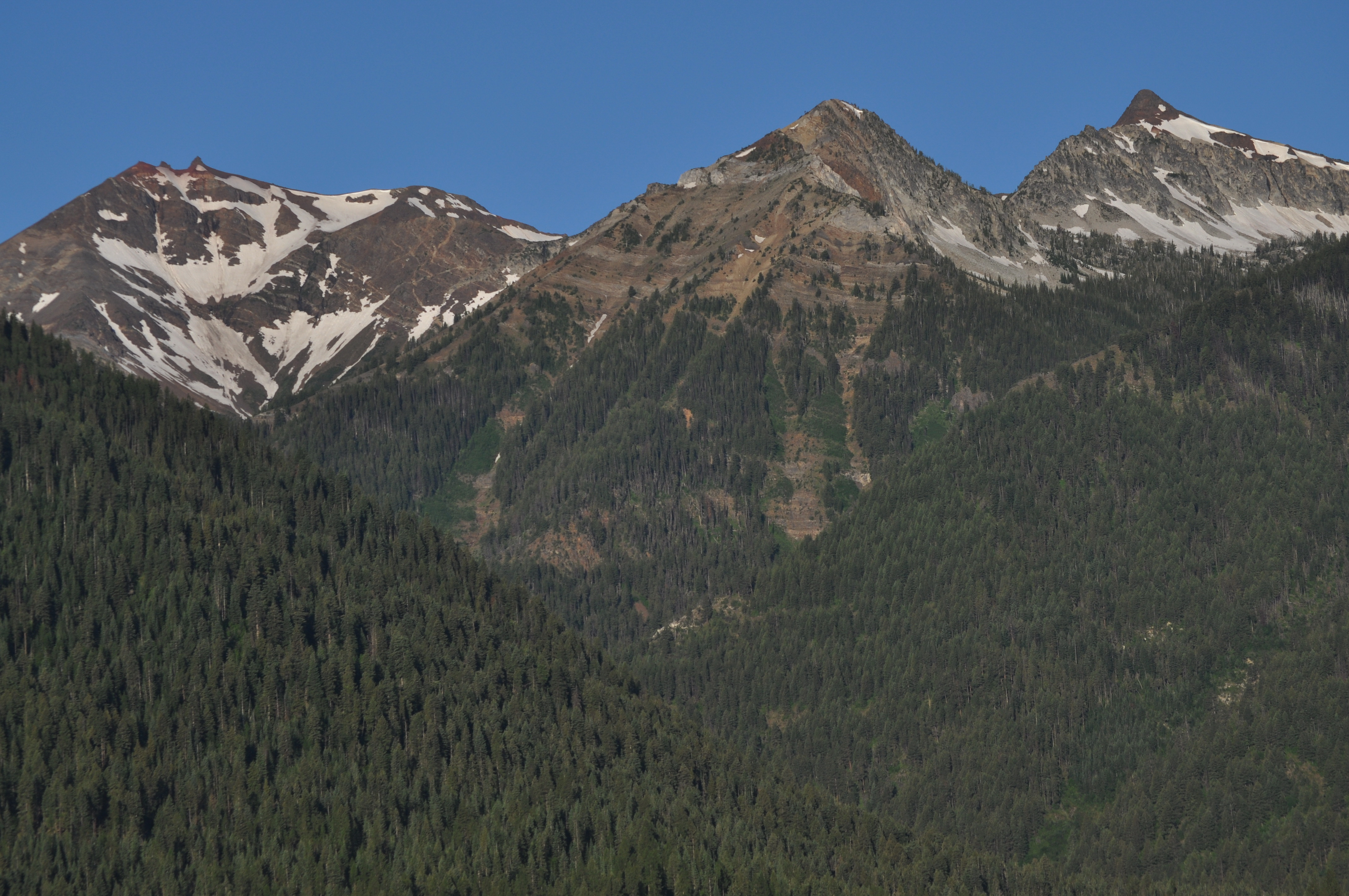
Twin Peaks (left) and Sawtooth Peak (upper right) seen from near the town of Joseph

== Climate ==
Based on the Köppen climate classification, Twin Peaks is located in a subarctic climate zone characterized by long, usually very cold winters, and mild summers. Winter temperatures can drop below −10 °F with wind chill factors below −20 °F. Most precipitation in the area is caused by orographic lift.

== See also ==
- List of mountain peaks of Oregon
