= Aneroid Lake =

Lake in the U.S. state of Oregon

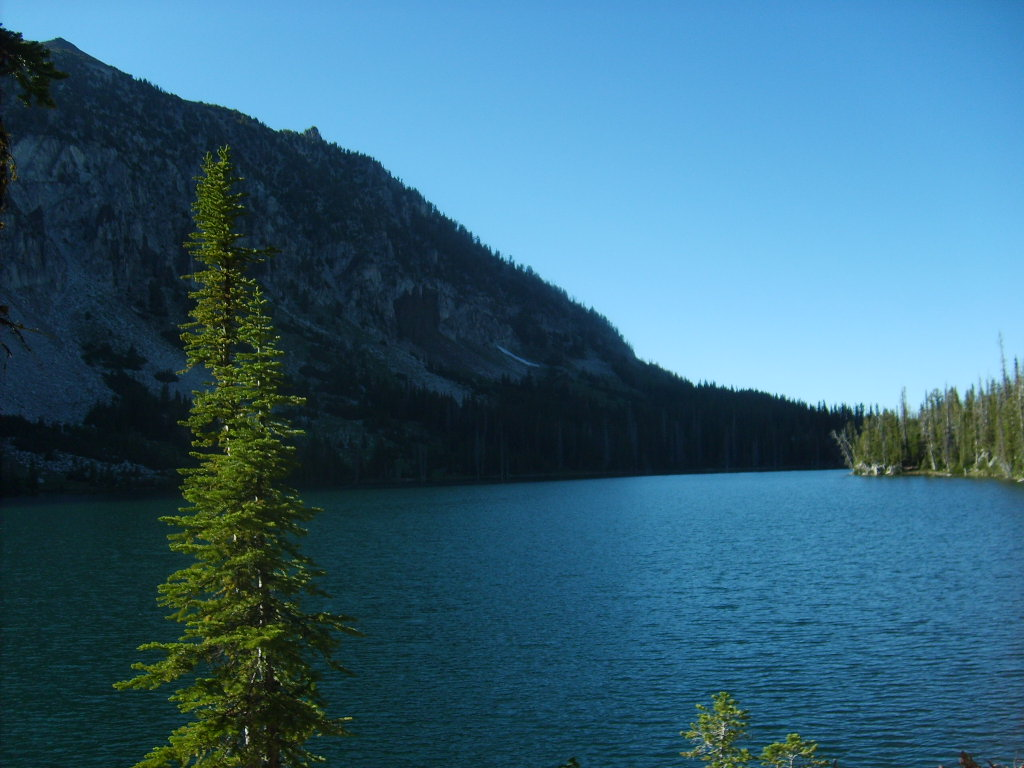
- Aneroid Lake northern view

- Location of Aneroid Lake in Oregon, USA. Aneroid Lake (the United States)
- Location: Eagle Cap Wilderness, Wallowa County, Oregon, US
- Coordinates: 45°12′30″N 117°12′15″W
- Type: Glacial; Cirque; Tarn
- Primary inflows: Precipitation, basin drainage
- Primary outflows: East Fork Wallowa River
- Basin countries: United States
- Max. length: 653 yd (597 m)
- Max. width: 478 yd (437 m)
- Surface area: 39 acres (16 ha)
- Max. depth: 49 ft (15 m)
- Shore length^{1}: 1.05 mi (1.69 km)
- Surface elevation: 7,520 ft (2,290 m)
- ^{1} Shore length is not a well-defined measure.

In common with many of the neighboring lakes in the Eagle Cap Wilderness of the Wallowa-Whitman National Forest in Wallowa County, Oregon, Aneroid Lake is nestled in an example of a cirque valley with large tarn scoured out of the mountain side by glacial movements during the Pleistocene. Located at the southern foot of Bonneville Mountain the lake and its basin form the headwaters of the East Fork Wallowa River. Aneroid Mountain, namesake of the lake, is about 1.5 miles (2.4 km) to the east, while Roger Lake lies in between a mere .5 miles (0.80 km) away. Dollar Lake is 1.5 miles (2.4 km) to the southeast and Pete's Point 1.5 miles (2.4 km) slightly to the southwest. Because the lake is within the boundaries of the Eagle Cap Wilderness protection area it is inaccessible by any motorized vehicle or any other mechanized mode of travel. However, there is a popular hiking trail for horse and foot traffic. A small group of private cabins that predate the wilderness designation are located beyond the south end of the lake. Aneroid Lake ties with Laverty Lake for the twenty-third highest lake in the Eagle Cap Wilderness at 7,500 ft (2,300 m) elevation.

== History ==
The first known name for the lake is believed to be Sterling Lake. In 1889 Tom Sterling with hired hand William H. Graves trailed a band of sheep through the Wallowas to Baker, Oregon. They had camped at the lake several days during the trek and it was known unofficially as Sterling Lake for a time. M. G. Royal, then president of the Weston Normal School, had camped in the area on a lecturing visit in 1893 and made an excursion to the lake with his family. He was so impressed by the natural beauty of the lake he named it Anna Royal Lake after his mother, Mrs. Mary Anne (Stanley) Royal. This name was not recorded in any more official manner than the inscribing of it on the flattened side of a tree limb and hammered into the ground at the shore's edge. Charles H.(Silver Tip) Seeber relocated to Wallowa county in 1889 from Walla Walla for health reasons. He held several patented mining claims in the area of the lake, and lived there almost continuously for many years. He remembers the lake being called Anna Royal Lake when he first arrived there but also that it was changed over time to Aneroid Lake.

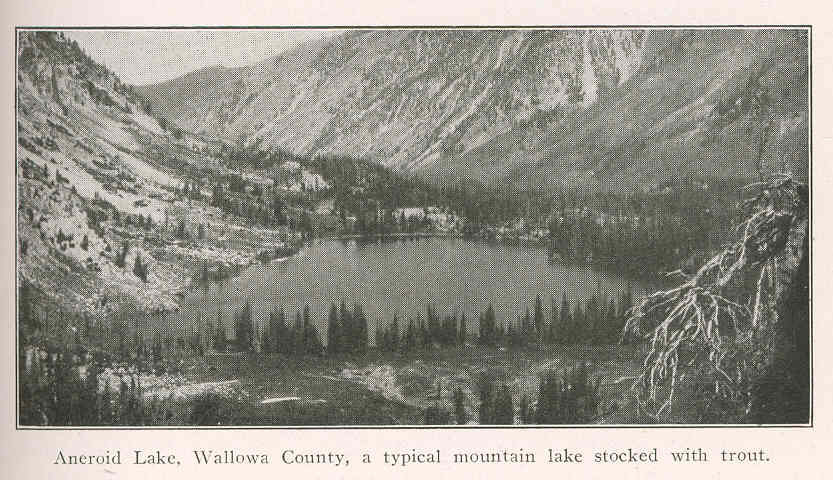
An early black and white image of Aneroid Lake

In the summer of 1897 Hoffman Philip was a member of an exploration expedition of the United States Commission of Fish and Fisheries that visited the nearby Wallowa Lake and collected specimens. Mr. Philip did not leave when the party completed their objective and turned homeward. The beauty and climate of the area fascinated him greatly at his 25 years of age. It would have kept him if not for the United States entering the Spanish–American War in 1898 and his fateful friendship with President Theodore Roosevelt while fighting with the Rough Riders. On a personal adventure in the fall of 1897 Hoffman struck out alone with his horse and rifle on a long ride, leaving the blazed trail. Failing to pick up the trail again as he had intended he came upon a stream and made camp along it spending a miserable, cold, dark night. At day break he followed the course of the stream eventually arriving at this small, wild lake. Checking his barometer he judged the altitude of the lake to be quite high. Upon his return he inquired locally about the lake and found no one aware of it having been named previously. He arbitrarily gave it the name Aneroid Lake, an attribute of the device he measured it with.

In the end it was decided the name was to remain Aneroid Lake mostly because Aneroid Mountain, a peak to the east, was already commonly known as sharing the name, and also because no records beyond the verbal accounts existed to support any effort in restoring any previous naming.

=== Camp Halton ===
Sometime prior to 1889 a doctor advised a 15 year old tuberculosis patient Charley Seeber, "You may live a week, you may live two, but you won't see your 17th birthday. If I were you, I would find myself a peaceful mountain lake somewhere and enjoy your last days as much as possible." Heeding that advise twice widowed father John F. Seeber Sr. moved his family from Walla Walla, Washington to Enterprise, Oregon 50 miles (80 km) to the southeast and a gain of almost 3,000 feet (910 m) in elevation. Charley hiked regularly up in the Wallowa Mountains surrounding the city in the hopes of improving the health of his lungs. In that effort he found the lake to fulfill his prescription from the doctor in Aneroid Lake. He filed three mining claims at the south end of the lake and over the next several years he built a cabin and foraged an existence from the lake and the land around it. His mining efforts didn't produce much in the manner of riches but in all of his building and searching he found what he was doing, was living. There were scars from the disease that had left him, such as the early turning of his hair to a grey-white earning him the widely known nickname "Silvertip".

In his new found good health Charley built a few more cabins and gave up on mining, finding it much more lucrative to offer lodging and supplies to the many adventurer heading into or out of the Cornucopia mining district 13 miles to the southeast. The estimated gross mining production of the Wallowa region, mainly in the gold of Cornucopia, was ten million dollars as of 1923. Being located right on the best north–south route of travel much of that traffic was coming and going in his direction regularly. In the later years he would also advertise in area newspapers offering the public a rustic mountain adventure with a comfortable bed to sleep in. Charley's residence at the lake, a two-story cabin with the lower portion being his general store offering unabashedly over priced goods and items. This was mainly because Joseph is over 10 miles (16 km) to the northwest and Enterprise another 6 miles (9.7 km) further than that. He would purchase his stock and pack it up the 4,000 feet (1,200 m) climb in elevation to the lake himself. He built a total of ten cabins over the five plus decades he lived there with six of them still standing as of August 2019. Charley "Silvertip" Seeber retired from his little resort at the lake in the mountains at the age of 86. The property is now in the hands of private owners who have since named it Camp Halton. There is live-in caretakers at the camp for up to six months of the year.

== Recreation ==
=== Trails ===
Aneroid Lake can be accessed by either the East Fork Wallowa River Trailhead at Wallowa Lake or Tenderfoot Trailhead. The East Fork Wallowa River Trailhead is by far a shorter hike to Aneroid Lake, being only 6 miles (9.7 km) long. It begins at the south end of Wallowa Lake, near Wallowa Lake State Park. After about 2 miles (3 km) of hiking on the East Fork Wallowa River Trail, the climber will reach a small dam. At 3.8 miles (6.1 km) there is a small, well built bridge. At 5.5 miles (8.9 km) lies Roger Lake. The trail is usually well maintained. It may be heavily traveled in the summer months.

=== Fishing ===
Aneroid lake is one of 12 lakes in the Eagle Cap Wilderness stocked with thirty five hundred to four thousand 2.5 in (6.4 cm) fingerling rainbow trout by helicopter every two years. The size and number of the trout was chosen because of the 95% survival rate in the initial 70 ft (21 m) to 100 ft (30 m) fall upon release from the "aerial stocking device" into the lake. It takes 2 years for these fish to grow to the legal harvest length of 8 in (20 cm) provided they survive the rest of the challenges of a high altitude lake. The Oregon Department of Fish and Wildlife started the program of stocking high alpine hike-in only lakes because of the amount of public feedback that fishing is an expected experience when visiting a wilderness. Factors taking a toll on survival numbers is water temperature, sufficient food supply, and especially the voracious predation of the naturally reproducing eastern brook trout established historically in the lake by longtime lake resident Charles "Silvertip" Seeber. Charley was known for often serving an over priced dinner of large, freshly caught trout to his lodging guests at his cabins on the south end of the lake, or alternately renting out the fishing boats he had packed up to the lake at some point in his fifty plus summers he spent there.

An attempt to stock the lake with larger 3 in (7.6 cm) to 4 in (10 cm) rainbow trout was executed in 2017 as part of a three to four year study. The larger fish can physically endure the challenges of the lake better and they are testing if a lesser amount of larger fish stocked will improve survival rates and net more legal length fish for anglers over time. Preliminary tests of dropping the larger fish showed very high rates of success.

=== White Winter Backcountry ===
The Eagle Cap Wilderness has many mountainous peaks and valleys with steep slopes and precipitous windswept ridges all with a high accumulation of yearly snowfall that begins as early as October. Aneroid Lake is a popular backcountry skiing and snowshoeing destination.

==== Avalanche History ====
The early spring irregular and unpredictable weather patterns at the upper elevations makes the area well known as a high risk zone for a sudden avalanche that begins without warning and instantly amasses an unstoppable force of snow and debris that swallows anything in its path. There are two known and recorded avalanche incidents, both caused by human activity, that resulted in the loss of life in the Aneroid Lake basin.

- February 14, 1982 – A group of eight people had set up camp in two igloos, a tent, and a Forest Service cabin on Saturday, February 13. Everyone in the group was equipped with emergency beacons, shovels, and complete awareness of the risk of avalanche around them. The group had purposely cancelled a trip to British Columbia because the risk of avalanche was too high and selected the slopes surrounding Aneroid Lake as an alternate location. The entire group was each reasonably educated in avalanche assessment and safety protocols. All members were in agreement that steep slopes even in this location were to be avoided as conditions were still too dangerous. On Sunday afternoon two skiers from the group, Richard Easter and Judith Scott had gone looking for a low hill to practice turning techniques and wandered a considerable distance from the rest of the group. Finding a light slope dotted with glades between trees Easter had Ms. Scott stand and wait in some larger timber on some relatively flat terrain while he skied ahead. Gently edging his way onto to slope, he turned and saw it coming. Unable to warn Ms. Scott in time the relatively small avalanche that had broken off at the ridge above them had more than enough volume to pin her instantly against a tree where she was standing and suffocate her with six feet of snow over the top. Mr. East was unhurt in the slide having stayed on top and had been carried over one hundred feet down the hill. He immediately pushed back up the slope and began a beacon search for Judith. Probing with the end of his ski he could not locate her position. He alerted the rest of the group for assistance which arrived to the location within fifteen minutes. It took over an hour to locate and dig down to her. CPR was administered for a lengthy period of time without success. It was never determined why the entire group had left the shovels behind at camp that day but the fact of it severely hampered the immediate rescue efforts from reaching her in time.
  The avalanche was classified as an SS-ASu-D 2-O and began at around 7800' elevation. It had a two foot thick fracture line that ran an estimated seventy five feet along a northwest aspect at the top and narrowed to about twenty five feet at the run-out zone two hundred feet below. Eighteen inches of fresh, heavy new snow had fallen two days prior to the accident over the top of a melt-freeze layer developed over a cycling of warm to very cold weather the month before. An accumulation of very dry powder was layered between them allowing the upper portion to slide free of the much thicker encrusted base layer once Easter had caused enough disturbance below to initiate the event.
- March 7, 2009 – Six skiers and the caretaker of Camp Halton skied the seven miles and three thousand feet of elevation gain from the trail head to the cabins on Thursday March 5, 2009. The following day friend Don Woodhouse, 52, of Brush Prairie, Washington, Roger T. Roepke age 50, and his 15 year old son Erich Roepke both of Enterprise, Oregon, along with the other three skiers laid out an up track along the ridge south of a good skiing area about a half a mile from the cabins locally known as Shoulder Bowl. (Note: Shoulder Bowl is the local name for a geologic feature to the south of Aneroid Lake and east side of Lookout Mountain. It is not known to be in any official record.) They climbed up to just below the summit of Lookout Mountain (Note: The local name for the ridge to the south between Aneroid Lake and Pete's Point. It is not to be confused with Lookout Mountain – Peakbagger.com) at approximately 8500' elevation and dug a snow pit to a depth of five feet on the eastern aspect to account for wind deposition. The results of the pit survey were not recorded but a witness reported remembering the layers: "6 inch fist, 6 inch 4F, 12 inch "two fingers", 24 inch 1F, then P on down." Additionally, a Rutschblock test was conducted. (Note: 152lbs, RB 6(3 jumps) Q3 @ 12 inches, and RB 6(4th jump) Q3 at 24 inches) Roger's interpretation of the collected data was "moderate stability, low energy". The six skied two runs each in groups of three down the Shoulder Bowl side and below the snow pit taking a line a bit further north each time for fresh snow. An additional three skiers joined the group at the cabins that Friday evening for a total of ten people on an overnight stay.
  The day of the accident the camp's caretaker had left for the Wallowa Lake trailhead early that Saturday morning. The Roepke's and Woodhouse also left a half hour earlier than the other six members of the party and climbed back up the same track past Shoulder Bowl on up to Lookout Mountain. When the six made the track up to Shoulder Bowl four followed on up to Lookout Mountain with two remaining to ski down Shoulder Bowl. Both the group of four and the group of two skied separate runs and met up down below with no one amongst them having made any visual observations for the location of the Roepke party. The group of four decided to climb back up for an additional run and were about one quarter of the way back up when, at 12:48 pm, the avalanche released.
  The crown fracture varied from three to six feet in depth along the four hundred feet of its upper length and although it initiated in the thinner snow just below the ridgeline it propagated itself diagonally across the mid slope in a well defined avalanche path. Condensing into two nodes with the southern two hundred fifty feet wide and a smaller one hundred foot wide more to the north. The angle of the slope averaged thirty seven to forty degrees along the full path of six hundred and twenty vertical feet with the run out ending in a debris field exceeding twelve feet in depth. The avalanche was classified as a HS-ASu-D 2.5-R 4-O.
  The year's snow pack had been only sixty six percent of normal through January 2009 and again a cycling weather pattern with numerous days of above freezing temperatures followed by more typical wintery weather through February created a melt-freeze crust upon the base layer providing the bed for the eventual catastrophe. There had been several reported avalanches in the immediate vicinity that were both human and naturally caused in the days prior. The Wallowa Mountains were not yet covered by any avalanche forecasting center at this time and the Payette Avalanche Center is over fifty miles to the east in McCall, Idaho. The Payette Center had issued advisories for high alpine northern slopes a few days before and also the day of the accident, but it is unknown if this resource was consulted prior to the event.
  Woodhouse said the initial movement was a large slab and he was struck near immediately from behind, forced to a sitting position and was gaining speed as he was pushed down the hill. He could see Erich Roepke less than a hundred yards below him and to his left because he had taken a fresh line more to the north. Roger had already begun his descent and was about one hundred and seventy yards directly below Woodhouse's position. When the slide began to slow and fill in around him, Woodhouse, still in a sitting position was able to wave his hands in front of his face and create an air pocket underneath the twelve inches of snow covering him. Erich was able to "swim" enough to keep on the surface and ended up only partially buried to his neck with one arm free.
  Everyone in the party had beacons, probes, and shovels and had converged on the scene of the accident within five minutes. Erich was verified as unhurt, and Woodhouse was located within minutes and had an airway cleared, mostly because he could be heard under the snow being so close to the surface. A false strike from transceiver due to multiple units in the same locality and precious time was lost digging in the wrong location. Thirty minutes after the release of the avalanche, five feet down Roger was located. Despite ninety minutes of continuous CPR they were unable to revive him.
  Upon returning to the cabins after four o'clock that afternoon with all the gear and the deceased secured in a sled, it was decidedly too late, and the party too well exhausted, to make the long trail out of the wilderness to report the accident until the next morning. A recovery team consisted of thirteen expert skiers and five additional members of a support team that included Roger's wife of twenty years providing her what was described by members of the rescue team as "valuable closure". It was a two day effort to bring the victim down out of the mountains.

== SNOTEL ==
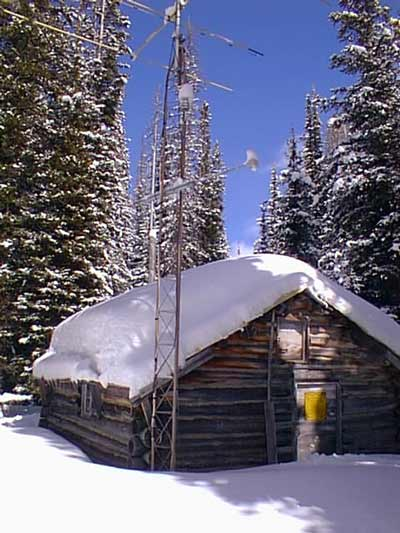
Aneroid Lake SNOTEL #2

One half mile east of Aneroid Lake is Aneroid Lake SNOTEL #2. Short for "snow telemetry", a SNOTEL is an assembly of scientific devices whose purpose is not only to measure the depth and water content of the snow, but also takes general precipitation and air temperature readings. Installed in 1981 by the Natural Resources Conservation Service who operates and maintains 81 of them within the state of Oregon alone. As of 2009, the station had not been equipped with an anemometer rendering it unable to provide any wind data.

=== History ===
By 1904 several independent ditch companies held water rights and were sharing a few small diversion dams on the Wallowa River below the natural outlet of Wallowa Lake. The need for adequate storage of run off water in the spring for use in the drier months lead to the formation of the Associated Ditch Companies in 1905. That same year the first low wooden dam was constructed raising the lake level four additional feet. The dam was replaced in 1916 with a larger concrete structure to supply the increasing demands of a thirsty agriculture depending upon it. The dam was raised an additional three feet in 1920, and again in 1929 to a height of twenty five feet over the natural level of the lake. (Note: The dam was built to be able to draw down the water level to 3.4 feet below the natural level of the lake making the overall height of the dam 28.4 feet.) The lake depth had begun angering landowners and developments around the lake with erosion and sloughing when the lake was allowed to overfill. The Associated Ditch Companies found itself embroiled in several lawsuits for mismanagement practices and legal challenges to how much water could be legally stored within the lake. The same year as the wooden dam, Pacific Power and Light Company constructed a hydroelectric plant at the foot of the lake and installed its draw pipe pulling fifteen cubic feet per second of water to generate electricity. It was an auxiliary station for the company and was not in operation full time adding to the difficulty of maintaining the water levels of the reservoir.

In the early 1920s snow survey science and water supply forecasting had proven more than valuable in predicting the volume of water that would flow down the streams and into valleys each year. Oregon was among the many western states that had begun establishing snow courses and taking snow surveys throughout their mountain ranges based on the pioneering work of Dr. James E. Church on Mount Rose near Reno, Nevada. The station at Aneroid Lake was installed in 1925 with records being kept after 1928. Wallowa County was initially responsible for obtaining the data from sampling the snow depth, determining water content and metering stream flows but when it began to feel budget constraints the program was defunded. The Associated Ditch Companies knew they had to have the information to accurately estimate how much water will be coming into the reservoir when the spring melt begins and volunteered to assume the responsibilities for doing so in 1933. Because Aneroid Lake is located within a protected area (Note: The Eagle Cap Wilderness was first a "Primitive Area" under the Forest Service's L-20 Regulations of 1929, and then further given a "wilderness" designation under the expanded and more uniform U Regulations 1-4 of 1939, followed by statute protection under the Wilderness Act of 1984.) surveyors could not take advantage of the continuing advances in over-snow travel machinery. The danger and hardships of merely reaching the snow course location with snowshoes and skis during the harshest weather months of the year proved too great resulting in measurements being taken only once per year, in early April before the melt. The method proved to be insufficient at providing the data that had become more and more valuable in accurate forecasting of the water supply. Agriculture and now recreation interests for boating and fishing wanted to know earlier and earlier in the year "How much water would there be?". This prompted the investment of nine hundred dollars of capital to construct a small survival cabin capable of sheltering two men for several weeks east of the lake and below its outlet that forms the East Fork Wallowa River. It has a wood stove, a table and a concrete frost-proof cabinet for the supplies brought by pack train in early October each year making the trips for surveyors much more frequent and the quality of the data was vastly improved.

The federal government began to take a serious interest in snow surveys and water supply forecasting after the drought of 1934 came with shadows of The Great Depression still lingering. The Bureau of Agricultural Engineering (Note: Predecessor to the Soil Conservation Service) was funded in 1935 by Congress for the task of creating the Federal-State Cooperative Snow Surveys. It was to create a network of snow courses, establish the routine and procedure of surveys, and compile the data into a forecast for each of the western states. These duties and the Bureau itself were assumed by the creation of the Soil Conservation Service in 1939. The Associated Ditch Companies conducted the surveys at Aneroid Lake in cooperation with the SCS until around 1950 after which sampling was then conducted by the SCS with the ever present support of the United States Forest Service.

In 1965 snow surveyors used a helicopter to land at the snow course and take measurements. Many environmental groups and wilderness supporters complained that this should not be allowed and in 1967 the US Forest Service ruled that landing helicopters in "wilderness or primitive protected areas" was prohibited. The treks to the Aneroid station in the winter and early spring months to survey the snow pack were continued until the development of Meteor Burst Radio technology. The SNOTEL network has the ability to bounce a radio wave off ions in the atmosphere left there by sand grain sized meteors burning up as they enter. This long-range data transmission capability allowed remote access to the snow courses and automated sampling of snow packs by sensors. Transition to the electronic SNOTEL system began in 1979 with Aneroid SNOTEL #2 coming online October 1980. The gathered data is now reported back to the NRCS in a daily report, or on demand, reducing the need to physically visit the station itself down to the original cycle of once per year in the summer months for maintenance.

=== Climate Data ===
Android Lake has a dry summer subarctic climate (Köppen Dsc).

Climate data for Aneroid Lake, Oregon, 1991–2020 normals: 7400ft (2256m)
Month	Jan	Feb	Mar	Apr	May	Jun	Jul	Aug	Sep	Oct	Nov	Dec	Year
Record high °F (°C)	56 (13)	59 (15)	66 (19)	64 (18)	75 (24)	83 (28)	91 (33)	85 (29)	82 (28)	74 (23)	69 (21)	57 (14)	91 (33)
Mean maximum °F (°C)	47 (8)	48 (9)	51 (11)	58 (14)	66 (19)	73 (23)	79 (26)	79 (26)	74 (23)	64 (18)	54 (12)	45 (7)	81 (27)
Mean daily maximum °F (°C)	32.2 (0.1)	32.6 (0.3)	36.6 (2.6)	41.0 (5.0)	49.2 (9.6)	55.8 (13.2)	67.3 (19.6)	66.5 (19.2)	58.4 (14.7)	46.3 (7.9)	36.1 (2.3)	30.3 (−0.9)	46.0 (7.8)
Daily mean °F (°C)	23.4 (−4.8)	23.1 (−4.9)	26.5 (−3.1)	30.4 (−0.9)	38.2 (3.4)	43.9 (6.6)	53.0 (11.7)	52.7 (11.5)	46.4 (8.0)	36.7 (2.6)	27.5 (−2.5)	21.8 (−5.7)	35.3 (1.8)
Mean daily minimum °F (°C)	14.7 (−9.6)	13.5 (−10.3)	16.3 (−8.7)	19.8 (−6.8)	27.2 (−2.7)	31.9 (−0.1)	38.7 (3.7)	39.0 (3.9)	34.4 (1.3)	27.1 (−2.7)	18.8 (−7.3)	13.3 (−10.4)	24.6 (−4.1)
Mean minimum °F (°C)	−6 (−21)	−6 (−21)	−1 (−18)	5 (−15)	12 (−11)	23 (−5)	29 (−2)	28 (−2)	22 (−6)	10 (−12)	−1 (−18)	−6 (−21)	−13 (−25)
Record low °F (°C)	−20 (−29)	−19 (−28)	−16 (−27)	−3 (−19)	4 (−16)	9 (−13)	17 (−8)	17 (−8)	11 (−12)	−9 (−23)	−22 (−30)	−27 (−33)	−27 (−33)
Average precipitation inches (mm)	5.21 (132)	4.67 (119)	5.45 (138)	4.35 (110)	4.29 (109)	3.44 (87)	0.99 (25)	0.90 (23)	1.70 (43)	3.46 (88)	4.93 (125)	5.95 (151)	45.34 (1,150)
Source 1: XMACIS2
Source 2: NOAA (Precipitation)

== See also ==
- List of lakes in Oregon
