= Minam =

Minam can refer to:

- Minam Station, a station of Busan Metro Line 3 in Busan
- Minam, Oregon, a community in the U.S. state of Oregon
- Minam River in the U.S. state of Oregon
- Kkonminam or Kkot-minam
