= Aneroid Mountain =

Mountain in Oregon, United States

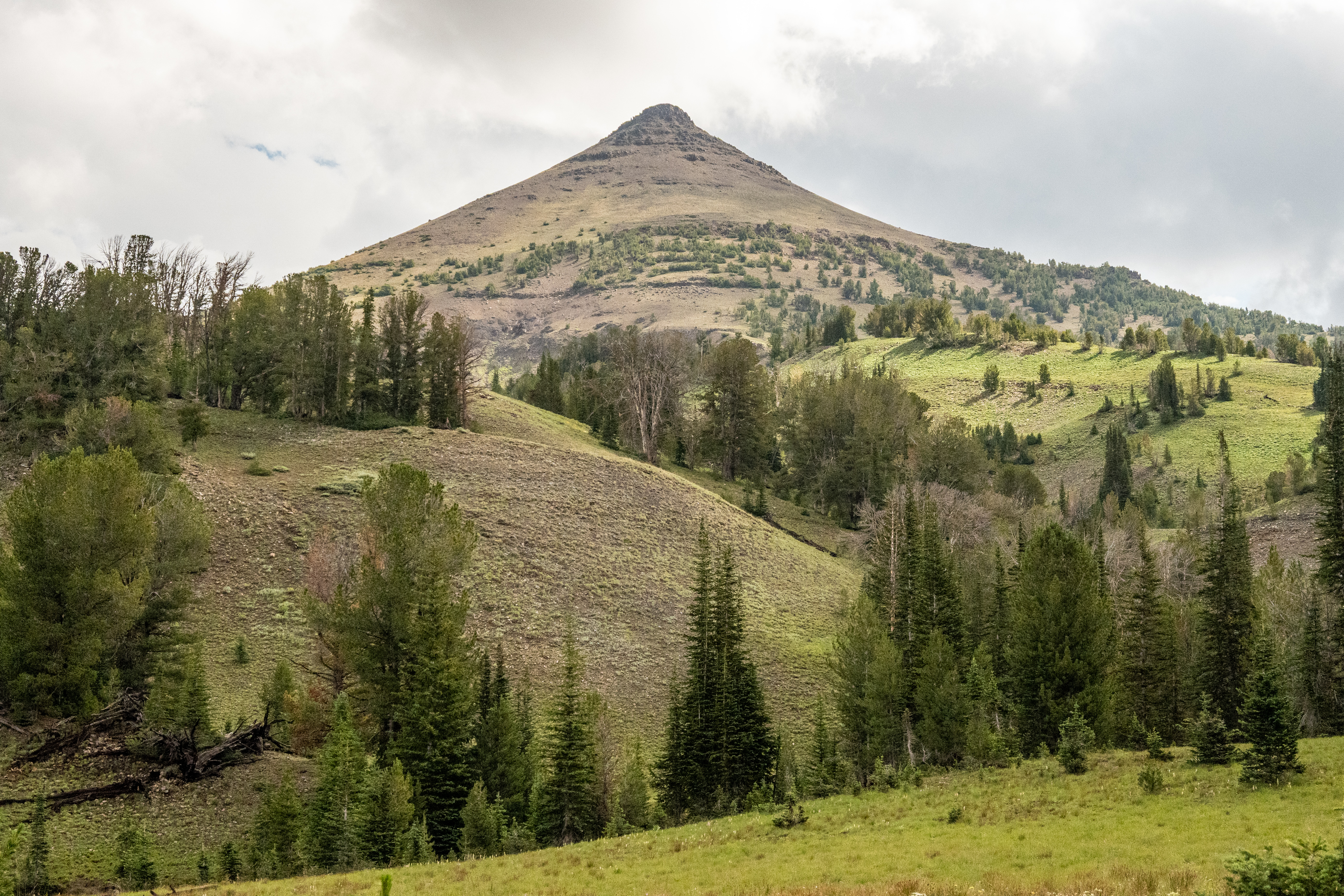
- View from the meadows along the East Fork Wallowa River

Highest point
- Elevation: 9,662 ft (2,945 m)
- Prominence: 2,102 ft (641 m)
- Parent peak: Hurwal Divide
- Isolation: 5.85 mi (9.41 km)
- Coordinates: 45°12′12″N 117°10′29″W

Geography
- Location within Oregon
- Location: Oregon, United States
- Parent range: Wallowa Mountains
- Topo map: USGS Aneroid Mountain

Aneroid Mountain is a 9,662-foot (2,945 m) peak in the Wallowa Mountains, in Wallowa County, Oregon in the United States. It is located in the McCully Basin within the Eagle Cap Wilderness of the Wallowa National Forest, about 15 miles (24 km) south of Joseph.

== See also ==
- List of mountain peaks of Oregon
