= Mirror Lake (Wallowa County, Oregon) =

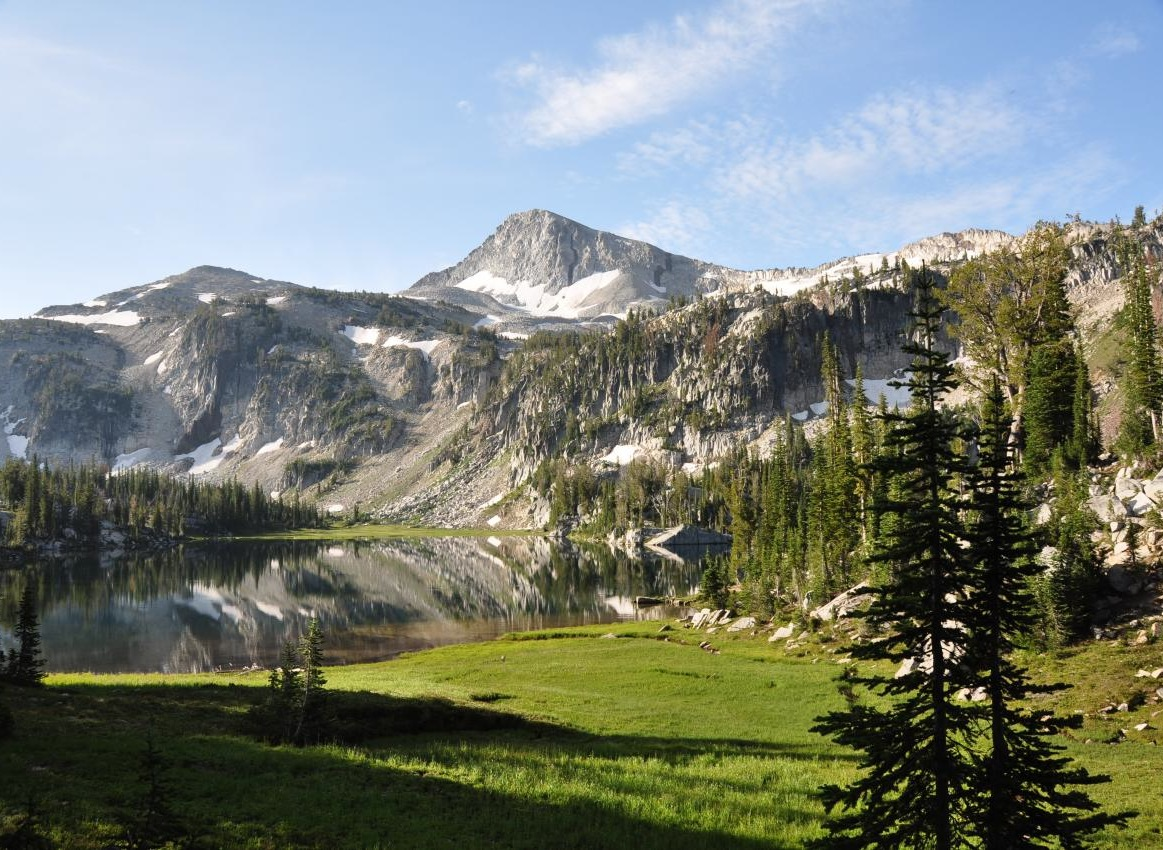
- Mirror Lake in 2009

- Location within Oregon
- Location: Wallowa County, Oregon
- Coordinates: 45°10′41″N 117°18′36″W
- Type: lake
- Basin countries: United States
- Surface elevation: 7,602 ft (2,317 m)

Mirror Lake is a lake in Wallowa County, Oregon. It is located in Eagle Cap Wilderness about 1.1 miles (1.8 km) north-northwest of Eagle Cap peak.
