= Dollar Lake (Wallowa County, Oregon) =

Lake in Wallowa County, Oregon, United States

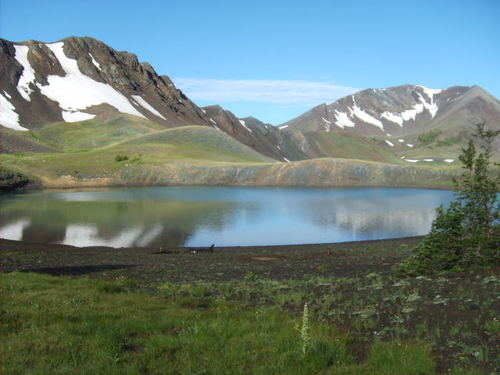

- Location within Oregon Location within the United States
- Location: Eagle Cap Wilderness, Wallowa County, Oregon
- Coordinates: 45°11′24″N 117°11′16″W
- Type: Tarn
- Basin countries: United States
- Max. length: 199 yd (182 m)
- Max. width: 163 yd (149 m)
- Average depth: 49 ft (15 m)
- Max. depth: 272 ft (83 m)
- Surface elevation: 8,440 ft (2,570 m)

Dollar Lake is a small tarn located on Aneroid Mountain in the Eagle Cap Wilderness of Northeastern Oregon, United States. It is between Aneroid Lake and Bonny Lakes and lies 1 mile (1.6 km) southwest of Aneroid Peak. It likely received its name because of its size and its almost perfectly round shape, much like that of a silver dollar. It is the third-highest lake in the Eagle Cap Wilderness.

== Trail ==
Dollar Lake can be accessed by Trail 1802. The route from Tenderfoot Trailhead or Tenderfoot Wagon Road Trail passes Bonny Lakes about 1.8 miles (2.9 km) before reaching Dollar Pass, at 8,420 feet (2,570 m) above sea level. Dollar Lake is off the trail, about 0.25 miles (0.40 km) southwest of the pass. A navigation device such as a compass or a GPS is recommended.

== See also ==
- List of lakes in Oregon
