= Little Minam River =

- Location of the mouth of the Little Minam River in Oregon

Location
- Country: United States
- State: Oregon
- County: Union

Physical characteristics
- Source: Wallowa Mountains
  - location: Cartwheel Ridge, Wallowa–Whitman National Forest
  - coordinates: 45°14′28″N 117°35′24″W
  - elevation: 6,799 ft (2,072 m)
- Mouth: Minam River
  - location: near Backbone Ridge
  - coordinates: 45°24′02″N 117°40′18″W
  - elevation: 3,396 ft (1,035 m)

The Little Minam River is a tributary of the Minam River in Union County in the U.S. state of Oregon. It begins at the base of Cartwheel Ridge in the Wallowa Mountains and flows generally north through the Wallowa–Whitman National Forest to meet the main stem river at the north end of Backbone Ridge.

== Recreation ==
The Moss Springs Campground, managed by the United States Forest Service, is about 9 miles (14 km) east of Cove and slightly west of a trailhead providing access for hikers and horse riders to the Minam and Little Minam. Open from August through December, it has sites for tent and trailer camping and horse camping. Amenities include toilets and picnic tables but no drinking water.

The Moss Springs Trailhead, near the campground, provides access to a network of trails through the forest around the Minam and Little Minam. The trailhead, 15 miles (24 km) from Union and 34 miles (55 km) from La Grande, is generally open by June each year. Amenities include parking and a toilet but no drinking water.

== Tributaries ==
The named tributaries of the Little Minam River from source to mouth are Dobbin, Fireline, and Horseshoe creeks, which enter from the left; Grizzly Creek, right; Threemile and Huckleberry creeks, left; Boulder Creek, right; Big Canyon, left; and Grouse and Black creeks, left.

== See also ==
- List of rivers of Oregon
