= Roger Lake =

Lake in Wallowa County, Oregon, United States

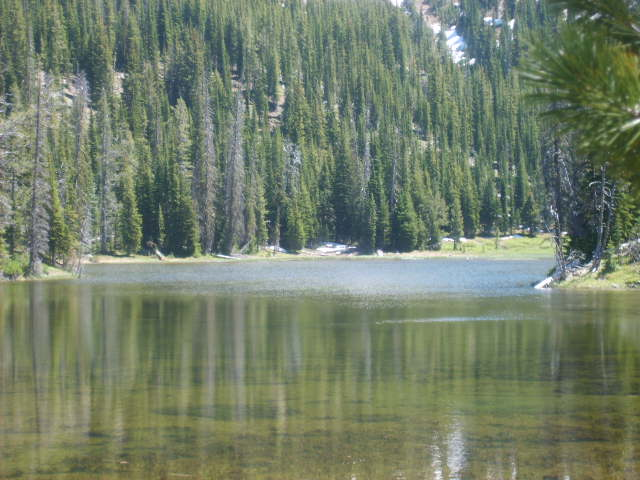

- Location within Oregon Location within the United States
- Location: Eagle Cap Wilderness, Wallowa County, Oregon
- Coordinates: 45.2085°N 117.1948°W
- Type: Pond
- Basin countries: United States
- Max. length: 302 yd (276 m)
- Max. width: 113 yd (103 m)
- Average depth: 30 ft (9.1 m)
- Max. depth: 46 ft (14 m)
- Surface elevation: 7,360 ft (2,240 m)

Roger Lake (also called Rogers Lake or Rogers Pond) is a mountain pond located in a meadow on Aneroid Mountain in the Eagle Cap Wilderness of Northeastern Oregon, United States. It is 0.5 miles (0.8 km) from Aneroid Lake on trail 1804. It is listed as the 29th highest lake in the Eagle Cap Wilderness

== Trail ==
Roger Lake can be accessed by either the East Fork Wallowa River Trailhead at Wallowa Lake or the Tenderfoot Trailhead. The East Fork Wallowa River Trailhead is by far a shorter hike to Roger Lake, being only 5.5 miles (8.9 km) long. After about 2 miles (3 km) of hiking on the East Fork Wallowa River Trail, the climber will reach a small dam. At 3.8 miles (6.1 km) there is a small, well built bridge. The average depth of the lake is 30 feet (9 m), and the maximum depth is 46 feet (14 m). The trail is usually very well maintained. It may be heavily traveled in the summer months.
