= McCully Basin =

Geologic structural basin in Oregon

- Forest surrounding McCully Creek
- Floor elevation: 7,897 ft (2,407 m)

Geography
- Country: United States
- State: Oregon
- Coordinates: 45°12′41.6″N 117°09′16.6″W
- Rivers: McCully Creek; Little Sheep Creek; Redmont Creek
- Interactive map of McCully Basin

The McCully Basin is a geologic structural basin in the northern boundary of Eagle Cap Wilderness in northeast Oregon. The basin is the topographic drainage of McCully Creek. Several Alpine Huts and campsite are located throughout the McCully Basin, which are used as a base camp in the winter for telemark skiing.

McCully Basin starts at the wilderness boundary and runs north–south towards Big Sheep Creek and Tenderfoot Wagon Road. The East Fork of the Wallowa River runs parallel to the McCully Basin to the West of the ridge formed from East Peak, Hidden Peak and Aneroid Mountain.

The McCully Basin is named from the Creek which takes its name from Frank D. McCully, a sheep rancher and US representative, notorious supporter of Chief Joseph.

== Geology ==
While the Eagle Cap Wilderness is characterized by high alpine lakes, there are no lakes within the McCully Basin. The geology of the peaks surrounding the McCully Basin are basalts that resemble more the strata in the Columbia River Gorge than to the distinctive slopes of marble and granite in most of the Wallowa–Whitman National Forest. Some of the more prominent peaks that border the McCully Basin are Mount Melissa (9,128 feet (2,782 m)) to the East and Aneroid Mountain (9,702 feet (2,957 m)) to the Southwest.

== Ecology ==
The hydrographic McCully Basin contains two neighboring ecoregions, with unclear ecological boundaries throughout. Surrounding the creek shores and its riparian zones are alpine forests which overlap extended meadows and flatlands that contrast the surrounding peaks.

=== Flora ===
The McCully basin starts in the north with formerly diseased forests composed mainly of Engelmann spruce, western larch, scrappy woods of lodgepole pine, Douglas fir, and an underbrush of Sitka alder, Labrador tea, lupin and grouseberry.

=== Fauna ===
Great Basin wildlife includes snowshoe hare, Red Squirrels, Columbian ground squirrels, and other small rodents, which are predominantly nocturnal. Mule deer are plentiful in the McCully Basin as well as large elk herds. The high elevation ridges are grazed by mountain goats.

The American dipper is also very common in the McCully Basin. Northern flicker, Clark's nutcrackers, Canada jay, Steller's jay, olive-sided Flycatchers, hermit thrushes, spotted towhee, ruby-crowned kinglets, winter wrens are other common bird species.

Sheep and cattle graze throughout Eagle Cap Wilderness, including the surroundings of Mount Nebo. Shortly after World War II with the impact of the wool industry, the number of sheep nearly disappeared in the Eagle Cap Wilderness, while at the beginning of the 1900, their numbers exceeded the carrying capacity of the wilderness.

== Access ==
Access to McCully Basin is from the McCully trailhead at the north boundary of the wilderness, southeast of the city of Joseph. The trail parallels Mt Howard trail at the western shore of McCully Creek. For two miles an unsurfaced and unmaintained temporary access road accompanies the trail towards Mt Howard. This marks the beginning of the Eagle Cap Wilderness. The trail ends at Tenderfoot Wagon Road, approximately 7.5 miles (12.1 km) from the McCully Trailhead. This area is surrounded by Big Sheep Creek, its North Fork and other tributaries. Wilderness visitor permit is required for transit within the Eagle Cap Wilderness area.
