= Mount Nebo (Oregon) =

Mountain in Oregon, United States

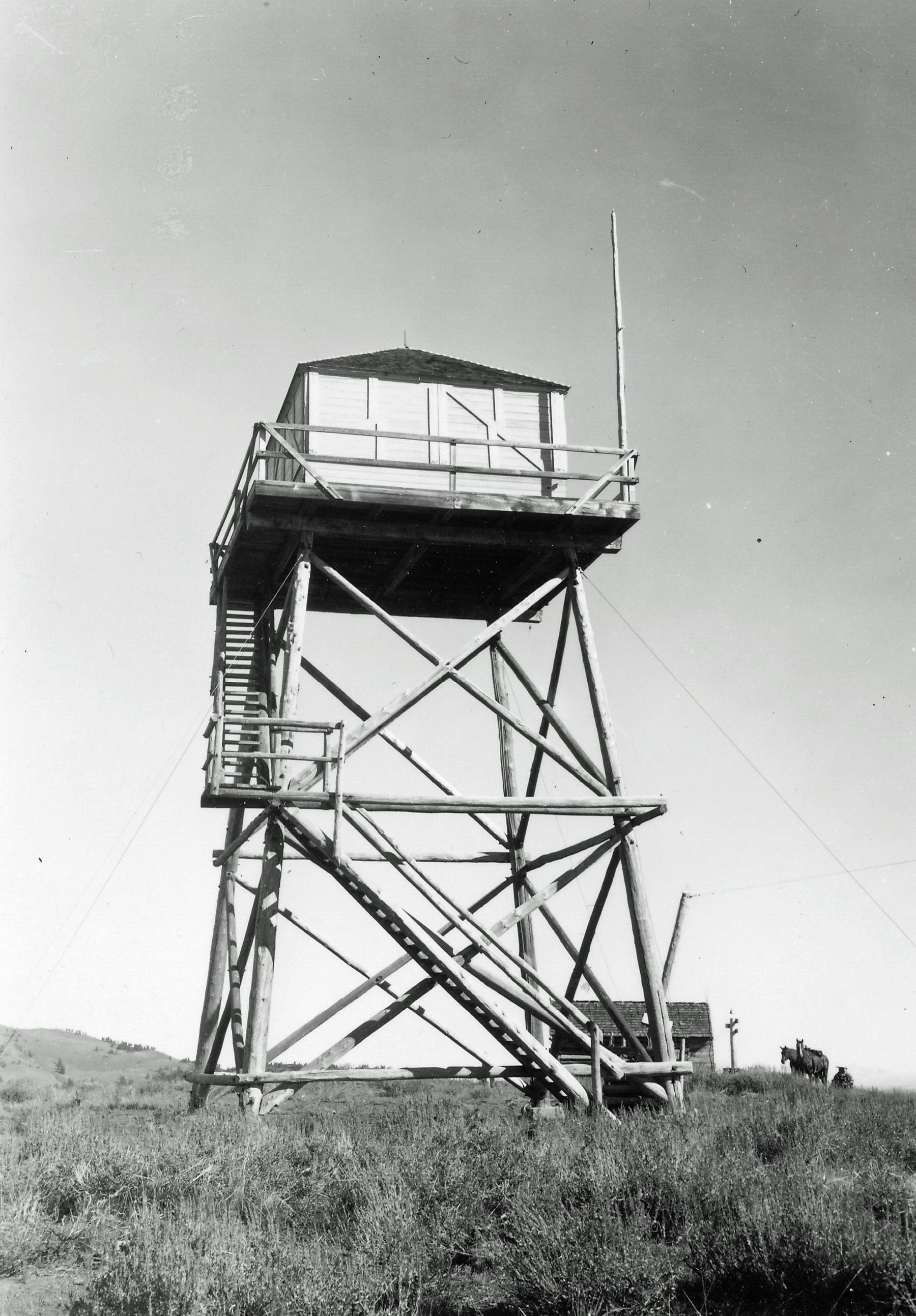
- Forest fire lookout tower and cabin in 1942 on Mt Nebo

Highest point
- Elevation: 8,261 ft (2,518 m) NAVD 88
- Prominence: 134 ft (41 m)
- Isolation: 0.62 mi (1.00 km)
- Coordinates: 45°09′38″N 117°08′16″W

Geography
- Location within Oregon
- Location: Wallowa county, Oregon, U.S.
- Parent range: Wallowa Mountains
- Topo map: USGS Aneroid Mountain

Climbing
- Easiest route: Hike

Mount Nebo is a 8,261-foot (2,518 m) mountain in the Eagle Cap Wilderness of Oregon, in the United States. Named after the biblical Mount Nebo overlooking Israel, which is said to be the place of Moses' death. It is the centerpiece of the Imnaha Divide, inside the Wallowa–Whitman National Forest. Mount Nebo is one of the important areas where sheep and cattle graze throughout Eagle Cap Wilderness.

== Location ==
Mount Nebo is located in the northern ridge of the Imnaha Divide, approximately 2 miles North of the confluence of the north and south forks of the Imnaha River. The slopes and meadows that surround Mount Nebo reach towards the Tenderfoot Wagon Road and Mine south of McCully Basin.

== Ecology ==
Mount Nebo has an open grassy south-facing slope. It was a target of a significant fire in the early 1900s. Since then, mountain big sagebrush has invaded most of the open grassy slope. Stands of subalpine fir mixed with Engelmann spruce, scattered lodgepole pine and small pockets of whitebark pine near the summit are the most notorious trees on the mountain and its surrounding ridges.

== Lookout tower ==
Several fire lookout towers were built in the early 1900s throughout the Wallowa–Whitman National Forest. Mount Nebo had a lookout tower and 10x10 cabin built in the 1920s. Maintenance and cabin occupation was reported through the 1950s. The tower and the cabin were removed in the 1970s.
