= Minam River =

River in NE Oregon, USA

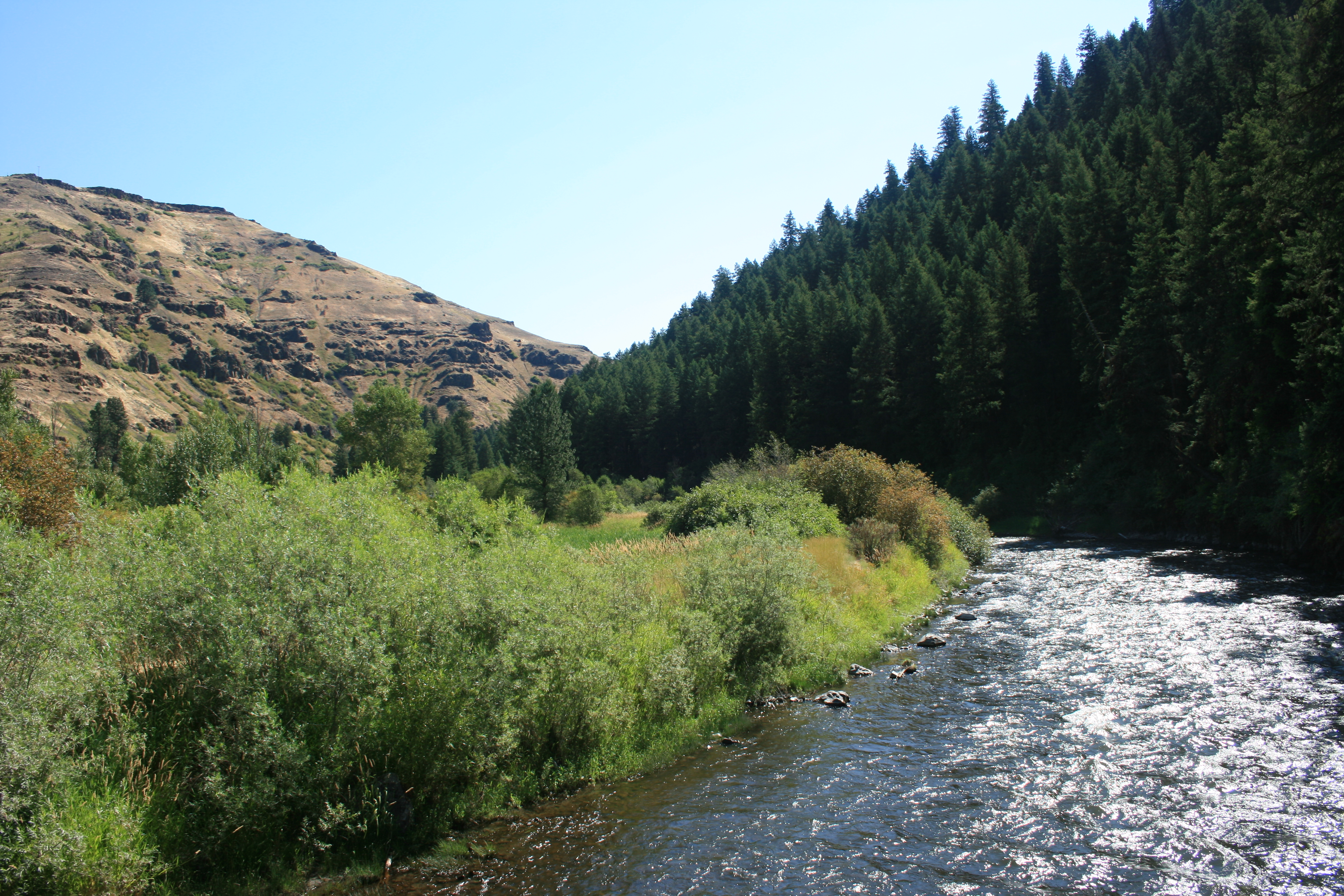
- Minam River near its confluence with the Wallowa River

- Location of the mouth of the Minam River in Oregon Minam River (the United States)

Location
- Country: United States
- State: Oregon
- County: Union and Wallowa

Physical characteristics
- Source: Eagle Cap Wilderness
  - location: Wallowa–Whitman National Forest, Union County
  - coordinates: 45°10′07″N 117°21′28″W
  - elevation: 7,684 ft (2,342 m)
- Mouth: Wallowa River
  - location: Minam, Wallowa County
  - coordinates: 45°37′17″N 117°43′14″W
  - elevation: 2,536 ft (773 m)
- Length: 51 mi (82 km)
- Basin size: 239 sq mi (620 km^{2})
- Discharge
  - average: 455 cu ft/s (12.9 m^{3}/s)

National Wild and Scenic River
- Type: Wild
- Designated: October 28, 1988

The Minam River is a tributary of the Wallowa River, 51 miles (82 km) long, in northeastern Oregon in the United States. It drains a rugged wilderness area of the Wallowa Mountains northeast of La Grande.

It rises in the Wallowas in the Eagle Cap Wilderness of the Wallowa–Whitman National Forest, just south of the Wallowa–Union border approximately 25 miles (40 km) southeast of La Grande at Blue Lake. It flows generally northwest through the mountains along the Wallowa–Union county line. It joins the Wallowa from the south at the community of Minam near Oregon Route 82. Its headwaters include springs stemming from outflow from Minam Lake, also the source of the Lostine River.

From its headwaters to the Eagle Cap Wilderness boundary downstream of Cougar Creek, a distance of 39 miles (63 km), the Minam River was declared part of the National Wild and Scenic Rivers System in 1988. Accessible mainly by United States Forest Service trails, the river basin supports diverse wildlife, including wolverine, bighorn sheep, elk, American black bear, and cougar.

The Minam, except for the lower 8 miles (13 km), where the surrounds have been heavily logged and otherwise altered, is largely pristine. It and the Wenaha River are the two largest rivers in Oregon that are nearly pristine.

point	geolocation	USGS map
mouth at Wallowa River	45.621256°N 117.720478°W	Minam
GNIS point 2, RM 10.1	45.499866°N 117.685198°W	Mount Moriah
GNIS point 3	45.374586°N 117.652424°W	Mount Fanny
GNIS point 4	45.347364°N 117.626036°W	Jim White Ridge
GNIS point 5	45.249867°N 117.529373°W	China Cap
GNIS point 6, RM 33.8	45.210980°N 117.500761°W	Steamboat Lake
Blue Lake source RM 46	45.168485°N 117.357688°W	Eagle Cap

== Tributaries ==
From source to mouth, the named tributaries of the Minam River are Pop and Trail creeks, which enter from the left; Lowry Gulch, left; Wild Sheep Creek, right; Granite Gulch, right; Elk Creek, left; and Last Chance Gulch, right. Then Cap, Rock, and Lackey creeks, all from the left; Pole Creek, right, Pot Creek, left; North Minam River, right, and Little Pot and Jerry creeks, left.

Then Threemile, Garwood, Whoopee, Chaparral, Wallowa, Horseheaven, and Horse Basin creeks, all from the right; the Little Minam River, left; Faun Creek, right, and Lobo and Eagle creeks, left. Then Murphy, Trout, Cougar, Gunderson, and Squaw creeks, all from the right.

== See also ==
- List of longest streams of Oregon
- List of rivers of Oregon
- List of National Wild and Scenic Rivers
