= Billy Jones Lake =

Lake in Oregon, United States

- Location within Oregon Location within the United States
- Location: Eagle Cap Wilderness, Wallowa County, Oregon, US
- Coordinates: 45.2496°N 117.3482°W
- Type: Tarn
- Basin countries: United States
- Max. length: 317 yd (290 m)
- Max. width: 126 yd (115 m)
- Surface elevation: 8,400 ft (2,560.3 m)

Billy Jones Lake is a tarn located on Hurricane Divide in the Eagle Cap Wilderness of Northeastern Oregon, United States. It is situated less than one mile from Echo Lake. It is the second highest lake in the Eagle Cap Wilderness at 8,400 ft (2,560.3 m), though some claim it to be slightly higher at 8,419 ft (2,566 m) or 8,435 ft (2,571 m). The only lake in the Eagle Cap Wilderness that is higher than Billy Jones Lake is Legore Lake at 8,950 ft (2,730 m) located 4 miles (6.4 km) from Billy Jones Lake.

== Trail ==
The trail to Billy Jones Lake begins at Hurricane Creek Trailhead. The starting trail number is 1807 but turns into trail number 1824. The trail passes Echo Lake before reaching Billy Jones Lake. The first 5 miles (8.0 km) (of 8 miles (13 km)) are heavily traveled in the summer and fall. However, the last three miles are lightly used, and are exceptionally difficult to climb, rising 2,400 ft (730 m).

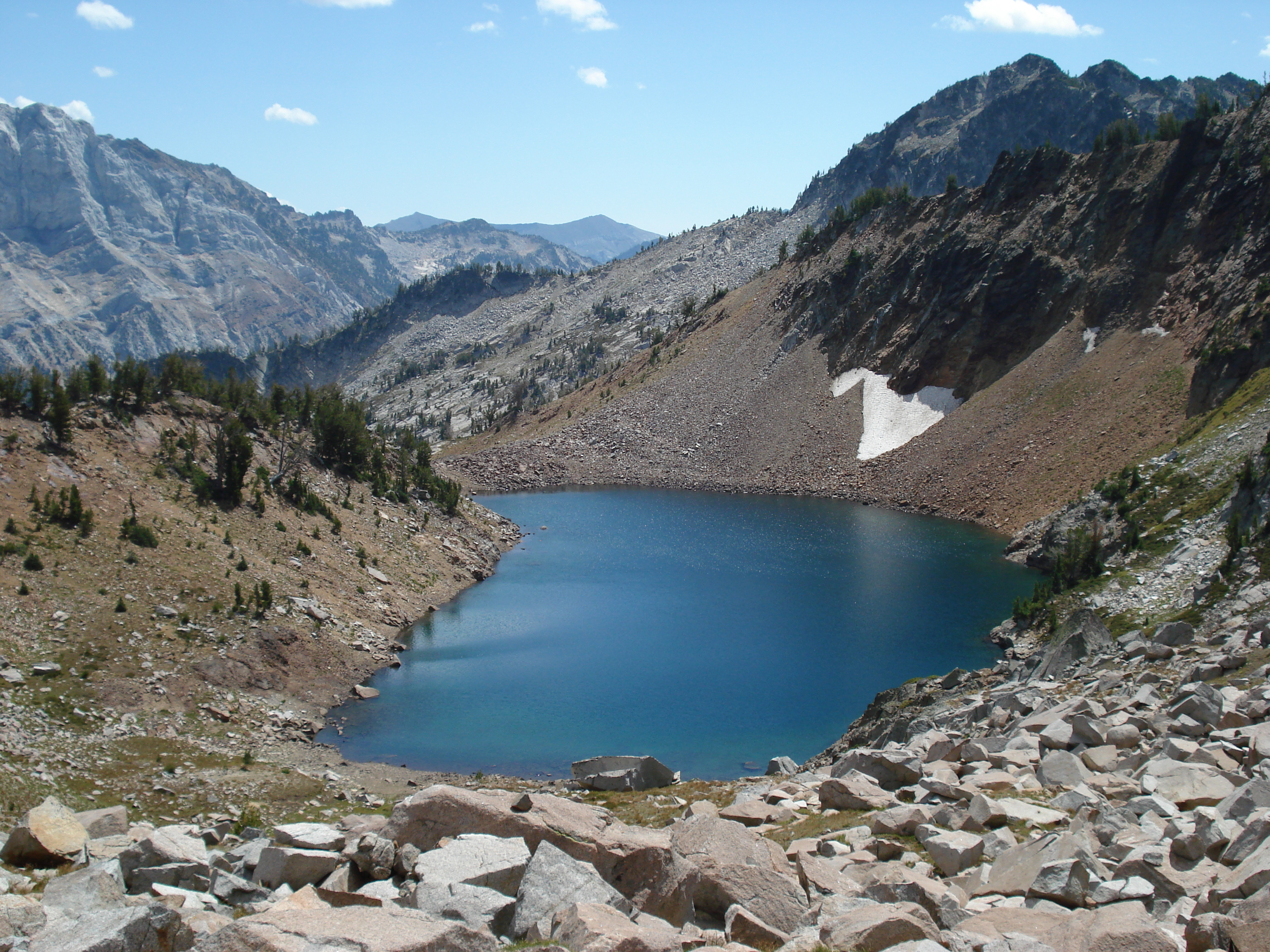
