= Minam Lake =

Modified lake in NE Oregon, USA

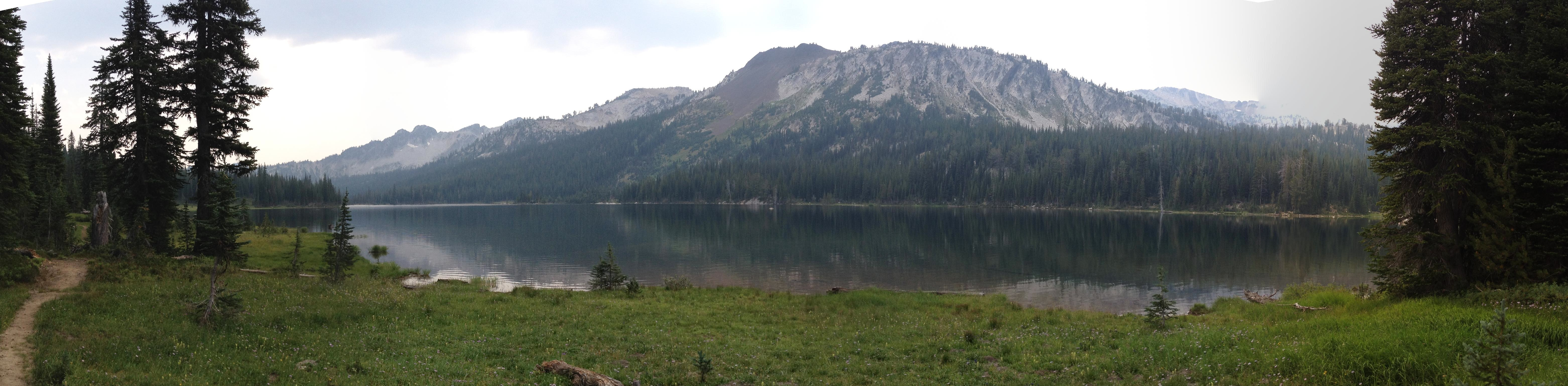
- Minam Lake

- Location within Oregon Location within the United States
- Location: Wallowa Mountains, Wallowa County, Oregon
- Coordinates: 45°10′56″N 117°21′01″W
- Type: Oligotrophic reservoir
- Primary outflows: Minam River and Lostine River
- Catchment area: 0.8 square miles (2.1 km^{2})
- Basin countries: United States
- Surface area: 59 acres (24 ha)
- Average depth: 10 feet (3.0 m)
- Max. depth: 28 feet (8.5 m)
- Water volume: 500 acre-feet (620,000 m^{3})
- Residence time: 5 months
- Shore length^{1}: 1.6 miles (2.6 km)
- Surface elevation: 7,379 feet (2,249 m)
- ^{1} Shore length is not a well-defined measure.

Minam Lake is a high-elevation reservoir in the Eagle Cap Wilderness of the Wallowa Mountains in the U.S. state of Oregon. The unusual reservoir, a modified natural lake, has outlets on both its north and south ends. The south outlet drains to the Minam River, and the north outlet is the source of the Lostine River.

A natural lake at this spot had only a south outlet. In the early 20th century, the lake was enlarged, and its flow altered by a 14-foot (4.3 m) high dam near the south end of the lake. The dam's purpose was to store additional water and to deflect it north for irrigation of farms in the Lostine Valley.

It is said that minam is a word that evolved in the mid-19th century from the native word e-mi-ne-mah. The latter referred to the Minam River Valley, where a kind of plant with edible roots grew in abundance. Mah was a suffix meaning valley or canyon.

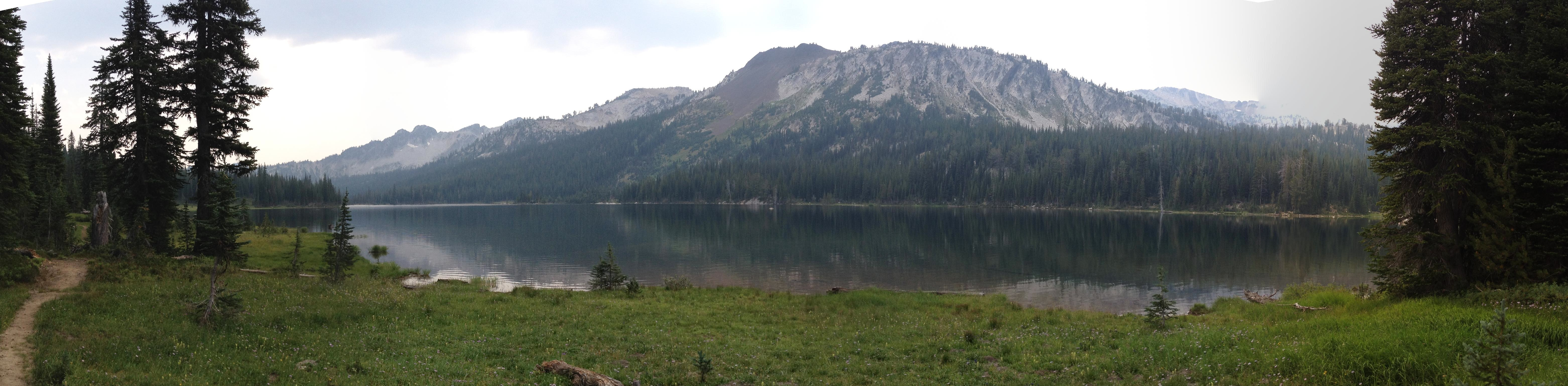
Panorama of the lake

== See also ==
- List of lakes in Oregon
