= Bonny Lakes =

Lakes in Oregon, United States

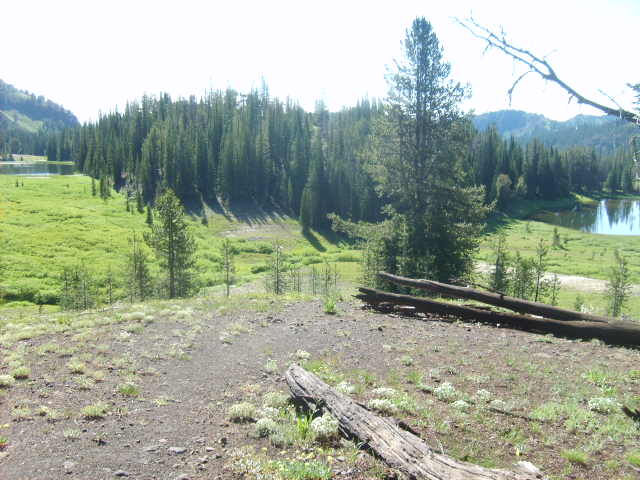
- Both west and east lakes

- Location within Oregon Location within the United States

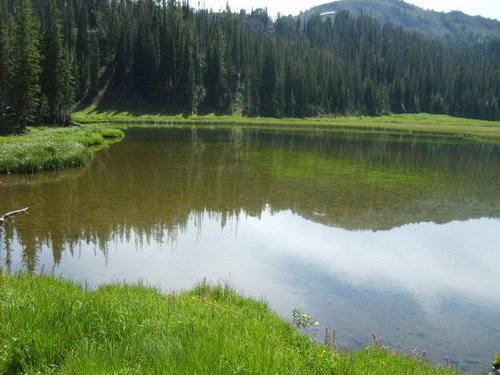
- The more western of the two lakes
- Location: Eagle Cap Wilderness, Wallowa County, Oregon, US
- Coordinates: 45°11′01″N 117°09′40″W
- Type: Pond
- Primary inflows: Big Sheep Creek
- Primary outflows: Big Sheep Creek
- Basin countries: United States
- Max. length: West Lake: 195 yd (178 m) East Lake: 189 yd (173 m)
- Max. width: West Lake: 189 yd (173 m) East Lake: 80 yd (73 m)
- Average depth: West Lake: 6 ft (1.8 m) East Lake: 4 ft (1.2 m)
- Surface elevation: 7,840 ft (2,390 m)

Bonny Lakes are two small, shallow, mountain ponds located in the Eagle Cap Wilderness of Northeastern Oregon, United States. They are positioned in a large meadow on Aneroid Mountain known as Bonny Lakes basin, which is about two miles east of Dollar Lake. Together they are listed as the 13th highest lakes in the Eagle Cap Wilderness at 7,840 ft (2,390 m).

== Trail ==
Bonny Lakes can be accessed by either the Wallowa Lake Trailhead (10 miles of travel) or the Tenderfoot Trailhead (3.5 miles of travel). The lakes lie on Trail 1802.

== See also ==
- List of lakes in Oregon
