= Lostine, Oregon =

- City
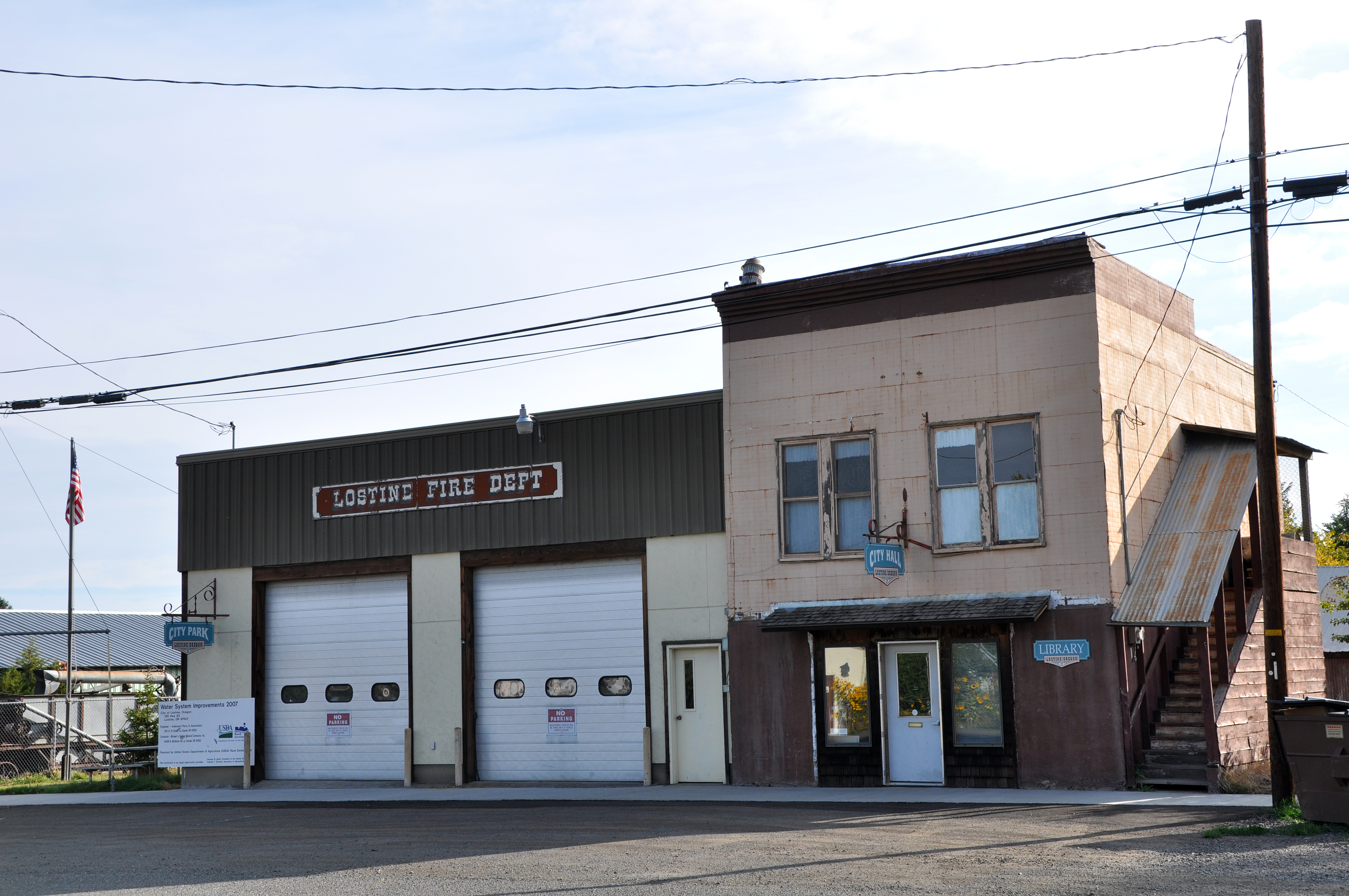
- Lostine fire station, city hall, and library
- Motto(s): A stop and a smile away
- Location in Oregon
- Coordinates: 45°29′12″N 117°25′46″W
- Country: United States
- State: Oregon
- County: Wallowa
- Incorporated: 1903; 123 years ago

Area
  - Total: 0.29 sq mi (0.75 km^{2})
  - Land: 0.29 sq mi (0.75 km^{2})
  - Water: 0 sq mi (0.00 km^{2})
- Elevation: 3,373 ft (1,028 m)

Population (2020)
  - Total: 241
  - Density: 837.7/sq mi (323.44/km^{2})
- Time zone: UTC-8 (Pacific)
  - Summer (DST): UTC-7 (Pacific)
- ZIP code: 97857
- Area code: 541
- FIPS code: 41-43900
- GNIS feature ID: 2410882
- Website: https://www.cityoflostine.com/

Lostine is a city in Wallowa County, Oregon, United States. The population was 241 at the 2020 census.

== History ==
Lostine was named after a place by the same name in Cherokee County, Kansas, that served as the site of a short-lived farmers' post office in the 1870s. Lostine, Oregon, established a post office in August 1878; W.R. Laughlin was the first postmaster. Lostine was platted in 1884.

== Geography ==
Lostine lies along Oregon Route 82 about halfway between Wallowa and Enterprise. Nearby is the Lostine River, a tributary of the Wallowa River, east of the Wallowa Mountains of northeastern Oregon.

According to the United States Census Bureau, the city has a total area of 0.30 square miles (0.78 km^{2}), all of it land.

=== Climate ===
This climatic region is typified by large seasonal temperature differences, with warm to hot (and often humid) summers and cold (sometimes severely cold) winters. According to the Köppen Climate Classification system, Lostine has a humid continental climate, abbreviated "Dfb" on climate maps.

== Demographics ==
Historical population
Census	Pop.	Note	%±
1910	230		—
1920	244		6.1%
1930	176		−27.9%
1940	204		15.9%
1950	178		−12.7%
1960	240		34.8%
1970	196		−18.3%
1980	250		27.6%
1990	231		−7.6%
2000	263		13.9%
2010	213		−19.0%
2020	241		13.1%
U.S. Decennial Census

=== 2020 census ===
As of the 2020 census, Lostine had a population of 241. The median age was 44.1 years. 23.7% of residents were under the age of 18 and 27.4% of residents were 65 years of age or older. For every 100 females there were 107.8 males, and for every 100 females age 18 and over there were 97.8 males age 18 and over.

0% of residents lived in urban areas, while 100.0% lived in rural areas.

There were 102 households in Lostine, of which 35.3% had children under the age of 18 living in them. Of all households, 45.1% were married-couple households, 23.5% were households with a male householder and no spouse or partner present, and 25.5% were households with a female householder and no spouse or partner present. About 30.3% of all households were made up of individuals and 20.5% had someone living alone who was 65 years of age or older.

There were 117 housing units, of which 12.8% were vacant. Among occupied housing units, 74.5% were owner-occupied and 25.5% were renter-occupied. The homeowner vacancy rate was <0.1% and the rental vacancy rate was <0.1%.

Racial composition as of the 2020 census
Race	Number	Percent
White	222	92.1%
Black or African American	0	0%
American Indian and Alaska Native	0	0%
Asian	3	1.2%
Native Hawaiian and Other Pacific Islander	0	0%
Some other race	1	0.4%
Two or more races	15	6.2%
Hispanic or Latino (of any race)	3	1.2%

=== 2010 census ===
As of the census of 2010, there were 213 people, 95 households, and 57 families residing in the city. The population density was 710.0 inhabitants per square mile (274.1/km^{2}). There were 112 housing units at an average density of 373.3 per square mile (144.1/km^{2}). The racial makeup of the city was 93.0% White, 2.3% Native American, 3.3% Asian, and 1.4% from two or more races. Hispanic or Latino of any race were 1.9% of the population.

There were 95 households, of which 23.2% had children under the age of 18 living with them, 47.4% were married couples living together, 9.5% had a female householder with no husband present, 3.2% had a male householder with no wife present, and 40.0% were non-families. 32.6% of all households were made up of individuals, and 12.6% had someone living alone who was 65 years of age or older. The average household size was 2.24 and the average family size was 2.82.

The median age in the city was 46.5 years. 22.1% of residents were under the age of 18; 5.6% were between the ages of 18 and 24; 21.2% were from 25 to 44; 33.4% were from 45 to 64; and 17.8% were 65 years of age or older. The gender makeup of the city was 51.2% male and 48.8% female.

=== 2000 census ===
As of the census of 2000, there were 263 people, 101 households, and 71 families residing in the city. The population density was 844.8 inhabitants per square mile (326.2/km^{2}). There were 118 housing units at an average density of 379.1 per square mile (146.4/km^{2}). The racial makeup of the city was 98.86% White, 0.38% Asian, 0.38% from other races, and 0.38% from two or more races. Hispanic or Latino of any race were 3.80% of the population.

There were 101 households, out of which 32.7% had children under the age of 18 living with them, 63.4% were married couples living together, 6.9% had a female householder with no husband present, and 29.7% were non-families. 23.8% of all households were made up of individuals, and 8.9% had someone living alone who was 65 years of age or older. The average household size was 2.60 and the average family size was 3.11.

In the city, the population was spread out, with 28.9% under the age of 18, 8.0% from 18 to 24, 23.2% from 25 to 44, 26.2% from 45 to 64, and 13.7% who were 65 years of age or older. The median age was 40 years. For every 100 females, there were 105.5 males. For every 100 females age 18 and over, there were 107.8 males.

The median income for a household in the city was $31,538, and the median income for a family was $35,536. Males had a median income of $31,250 versus $16,667 for females. The per capita income for the city was $13,388. About 7.0% of families and 13.3% of the population were below the poverty line, including 20.0% of those under the age of 18 and 14.8% of those 65 or over.

== Education ==
It is in the Wallowa School District 12.
