= Legore Lake =

Lake in the United States of America

LeGore Lake
- Location within Oregon Location within the United States
- Location: Eagle Cap Wilderness, Wallowa County, Oregon, US
- Coordinates: 45.3096°N 117.3466°W
- Type: Tarn
- Primary outflows: Falls Creek
- Basin countries: United States
- Max. length: 193 yards (176 m)
- Max. width: 124 yards (113 m)
- Surface elevation: 8,950 ft (2,730 m)

LeGore Lake is a tarn located in the Eagle Cap Wilderness of northeastern Oregon, United States. It is the highest true lake in Oregon at 8,950 feet (2,730 m) elevation. It is positioned near Twin Peaks and is accessed by a 4-mile "extremely steep uphill" hiking trail that ascends 4,000 feet and passes the LeGore mine, the lake's namesake.
