= Lostine River =

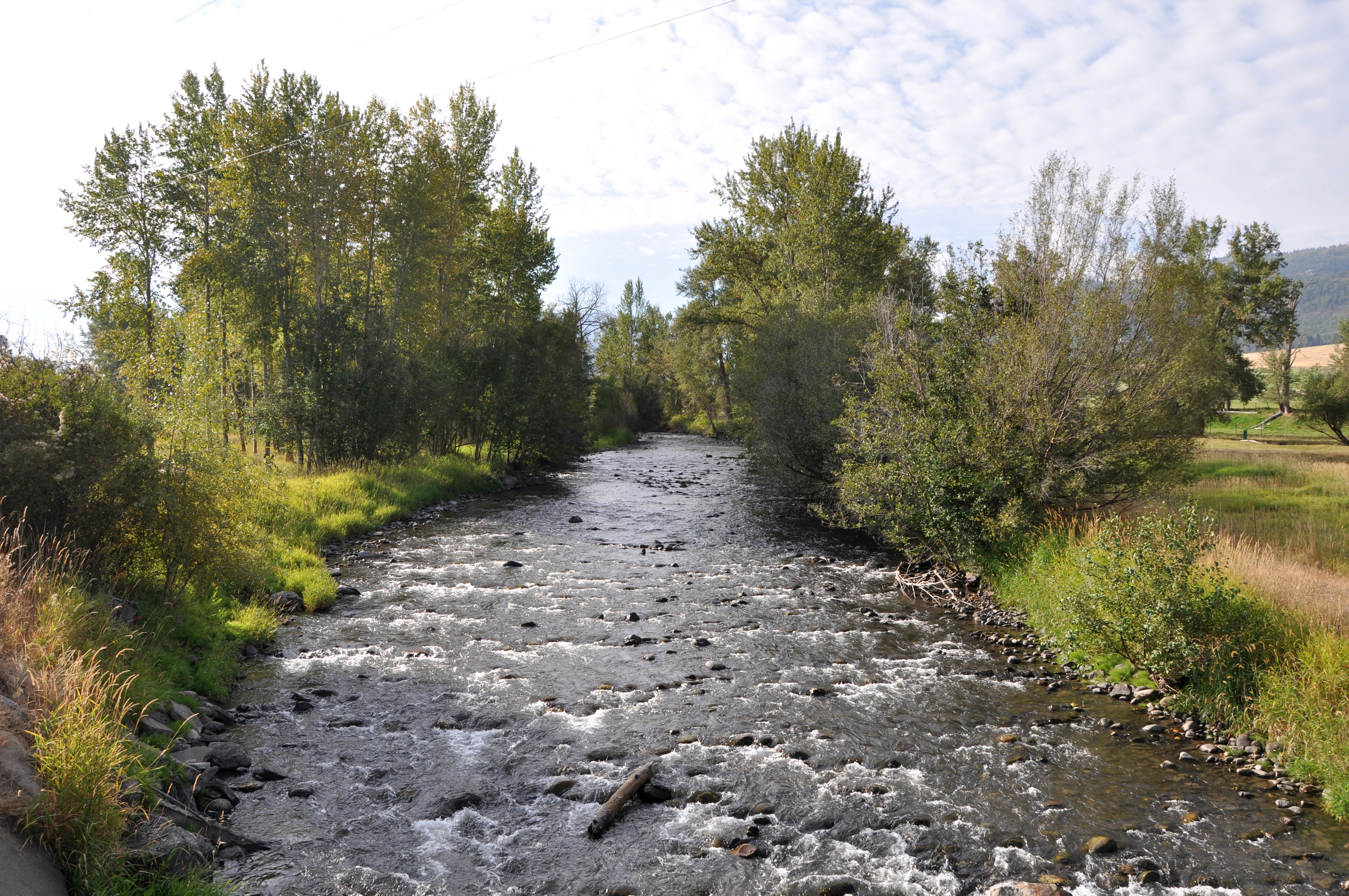
- Looking upstream from Route 82 bridge at Lostine

- Location of the mouth of Lostine River in Oregon

Location
- Country: United States
- State: Oregon
- County: Wallowa

Physical characteristics
- Source: Minam Lake
  - location: Eagle Cap Wilderness, Wallowa Mountains, Wallowa–Whitman National Forest
  - coordinates: 45°11′08″N 117°21′05″W
  - elevation: 7,383 ft (2,250 m)
- Mouth: Wallowa River
  - location: Lostine
  - coordinates: 45°33′07″N 117°29′26″W
  - elevation: 3,008 ft (917 m)
- Length: 31.4 mi (50.5 km)
- Discharge
  - location: 10 miles (16 km) from the mouth
  - average: 193 cu ft/s (5.5 m^{3}/s)
  - minimum: 10 cu ft/s (0.28 m^{3}/s)
  - maximum: 2,550 cu ft/s (72 m^{3}/s)

National Wild and Scenic River
- Type: Wild, Recreational
- Designated: October 28, 1988

The Lostine River is a 31.4-mile-long (50.5 km) tributary of the Wallowa River in northeastern Oregon in the United States. It drains a portion of the Eagle Cap Wilderness of the Wallowa Mountains in the Wallowa–Whitman National Forest and joins the Wallowa River at Wallowa.

In 1988, the upper 16 miles (26 km) of the Lostine River were listed as Wild and Scenic. A 5-mile (8 km) segment in the wilderness below the river's source at Minam Lake were classified "wild". The next 11 miles (18 km) were designated "recreational".

The main stem rises at Minam Lake at an elevation of nearly 7,400 feet (2,300 m) above sea level, about 15 miles (24 km) south of the city of Lostine and 10 miles (16 km) west-southwest of Joseph. The river flows generally north following a glaciated U-shaped canyon. It exits the national forest at an elevation of 3,930 feet (1,200 m) and gradually changes character as it reaches more level terrain which slopes gradually down to 3,000 feet (910 m), where it meets the Wallowa River. The river's flow varies seasonally from about 50 to 1,000 cubic feet per second (1.4 to 28.3 m^{3}/s).

Irrigation diversions, which play a significant role in the river, contributed to the extinction of the local run of Coho salmon in the 1960s and reduced the population of the run of spring Chinook salmon to a low of 13 fish in 1999. Both runs had been an historic source of food for the Nez Perce people. The Nez Perce began restoration efforts in the 1990s, and by 2005, the Chinook salmon run had risen to 800 fish. An agreement that year among farmers, the Nez Perce, and the Oregon Water Trust led to efforts to preserve the stream flow during summer, helping the salmon to survive. By 2009, the run had increased to more than 2,000 Chinook salmon.

== See also ==
- List of rivers of Oregon
- List of National Wild and Scenic Rivers
