= Eagle Cap Wilderness =

Wilderness area in northeastern Oregon, U.S.

- IUCN category Ib (wilderness area)
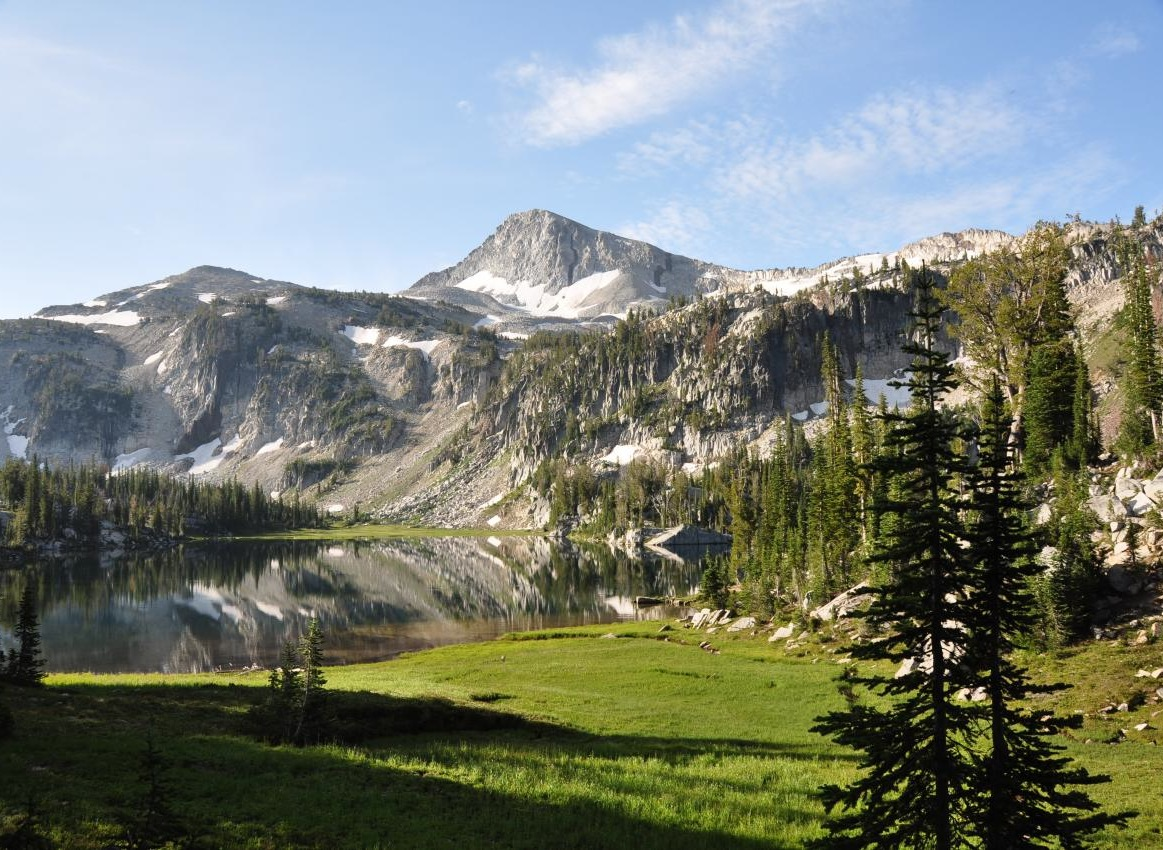
- Mirror Lake in the Eagle Cap Wilderness

- Location within the United States
- Location: Wallowa / Union / Baker counties, Oregon, United States
- Nearest city: Enterprise, Oregon
- Coordinates: 45°14′32″N 117°26′30″W
- Area: 361,446 acres (1,462.72 km^{2}; 564.759 sq mi)
- Established: 1940
- Governing body: U.S. Forest Service

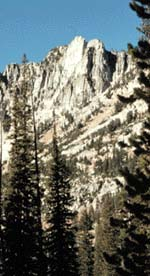
Eagle Cap Wilderness

Eagle Cap Wilderness is a wilderness area located in the Wallowa Mountains of northeastern Oregon (United States), within the Wallowa–Whitman National Forest. The wilderness was established in 1940. In 1964, it was included in the National Wilderness Preservation System. A boundary revision in 1972 added 73,000 acres (300 square kilometers; 114 square miles) and the Wilderness Act of 1964 added 66,100 acres (267 square kilometers; 103 square miles) resulting in its current size of 361,446 acres (1,463 km^{2}; 565 sq mi), making Eagle Cap by far Oregon's largest wilderness area.

Eagle Cap Wilderness is named after a peak in the Wallowa Mountains, which were once called the Eagle Mountains. At 9,572 feet (2,918 m) Eagle Cap was incorrectly thought to be the highest peak in the range.

== Topography ==
The Eagle Cap Wilderness is characterized by high alpine lakes and meadows, bare granite peaks and ridges, and U-shaped glacial valleys. Thick timber is found in the lower valleys and scattered alpine timber on the upper slopes. Elevations in the wilderness range from approximately 3,000 feet (914 m) in lower valleys to 9,838 feet (2,999 m) at the summit of Sacajawea Peak with 30 other summits exceeding 8,000 feet (2,400 m). The wilderness is home to Legore Lake, the highest true lake in Oregon at 8,950 feet (2,728 m), as well as more than 60 named alpine lakes and tarns (12 of which are above 8,000 feet), and more than 37 miles (60 km) of streams.

== History ==
The Eagle Cap Wilderness and surrounding country in the Wallowa–Whitman National Forest was first occupied by the ancestors of the Nez Perce Indian tribe around 1400 AD, and later by the Cayuse, the Shoshone, and Bannocks. The wilderness was used as hunting grounds for bighorn sheep and deer and to gather huckleberries. It was the summer home to the Joseph Band of the Nez Perce tribe. 1860 marked the year the first settlers moved into the Wallowa Valley. In 1930, the Eagle Cap was established as a primitive area and in 1940 earned wilderness designation.

== Wildlife ==
Eagle Cap Wilderness is home to a variety of wildlife, including black bears, cougars, Rocky Mountain bighorn sheep, and mountain goats. In the summer white-tailed deer, mule deer, and Rocky Mountain elk roam the wilderness. Smaller mammals that inhabit the area year-round include the pika, pine martens, wolverines, badgers, squirrels, and marmots. Birds include peregrine falcons, bald eagles, golden eagles, ferruginous hawks, and gray-crowned rosy finch. Trout can be found in many of the lakes and streams in the wilderness. The Oregon State record golden trout was caught in the wilderness in 1987, by Douglas White. The lake where it was caught was not named.

Sheep and cattle graze throughout Eagle Cap Wilderness, especially the surroundings of Mount Nebo. Shortly after World War II with the impact of the wool industry, the number of sheep nearly disappeared in the Eagle Cap Wilderness, while at the beginning of the 1900, their numbers exceeded the carrying capacity of the wilderness.

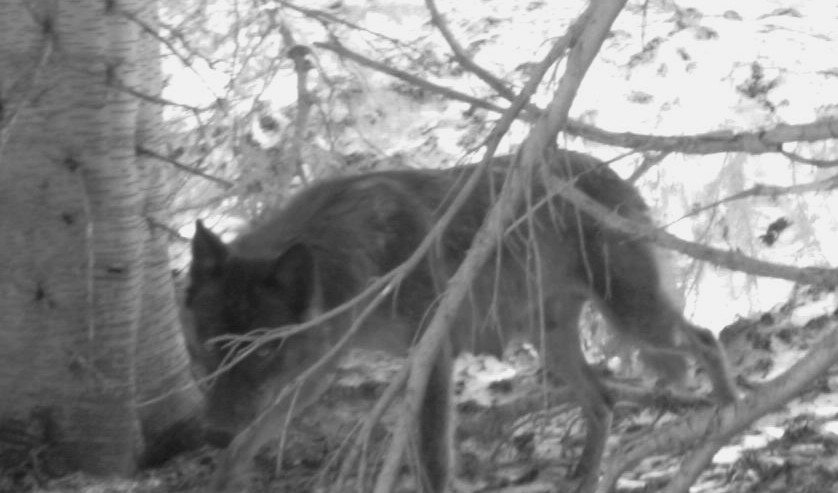
A lactating female wolf in the Eagle Cap Wilderness. Image captured by remote camera on June 4, 2012.

=== Wolves ===
Wolves have returned to Eagle Cap Wilderness with no reported encounters with humans, although some losses of sheep and cattle have been attributed to wolves in the area. In 2012, a trail-cam recorded a female black wolf. Tracking of the wolf revealed at least three total wolves in an area east of Minam River. Further surveys by the end of 2012 showed a count of at least seven wolves in a pack within the Upper Minam River area. The Oregon Department of Fish and Wildlife reported in 2013 a total of six known packs with 46 total wolves. All animals belonged to the same pack and are designated Minam Pack.

The first grey wolf trapped and radio-collared tagged by the ODFW was an 81 pounds (37 kg) female individual and marks the twentieth radio-collared wolf in Oregon. Another female was radio-collared which dispersed from the Miniam Pack and found traveling with another male wolf within the Miniam Area and into the Keating Unit. Through 2019 the Minam Pack produced litters annually within the Eagle Cap Wilderness. One of the females from the Minam Pack formed a pair bond in 2014 with a male member of the Snake River Pack forming a new pack within the Eagle Cap Wilderness, designated the Catherine Pack. The adult female was found deceased in 2019 although the pack remained classified as a breeding pack through 2019.

== Vegetation ==
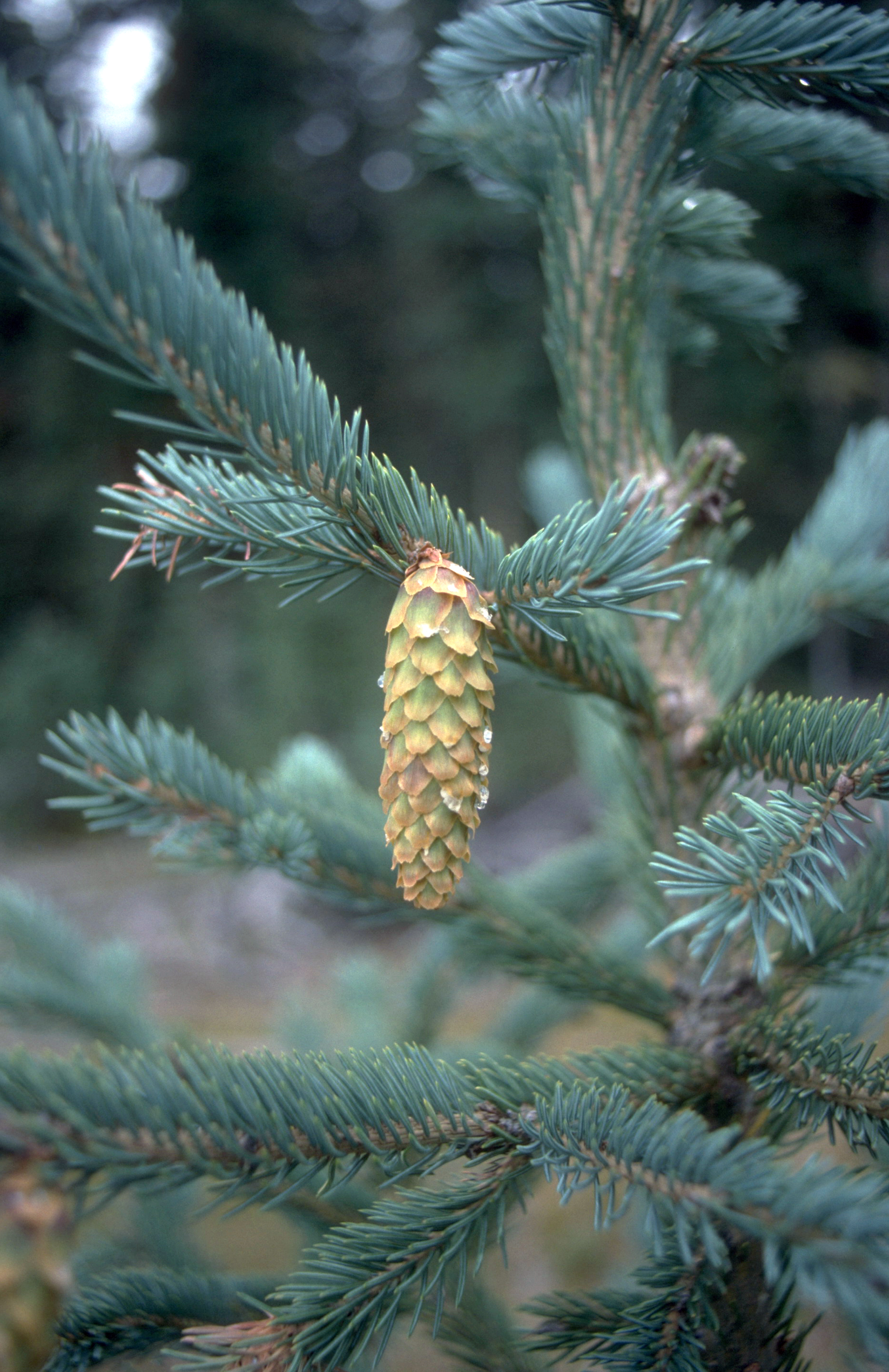
Engelmann spruce (Picea engelmannii)

Plant communities in the Eagle Cap Wilderness range from low elevation grasslands and ponderosa pine forest to alpine meadows. Engelmann spruce, larch, mountain hemlock, sub-alpine fir, and whitebark pine can be found in the higher elevations. Varieties of Indian paintbrush, sego lilies, elephanthead, larkspur, shooting star, and bluebells are abundant in the meadows. The wilderness does contain some small groves of old growth forest.

== Recreation ==
As Oregon's largest wilderness area, Eagle Cap offers many recreational activities, including hiking, backpacking, horseback riding, hunting, fishing, camping, and wildlife watching. Winter brings backcountry skiing and snowshoeing opportunities. Several Alpine Huts and campsites are located throughout the McCully Basin, which are used as a base camp in the winter for telemark skiing. There are 47 trailheads and approximately 534 miles (859 km) of trails in Eagle Cap, accessible from Wallowa, Union, and Baker Counties, and leading to all areas of the wilderness.

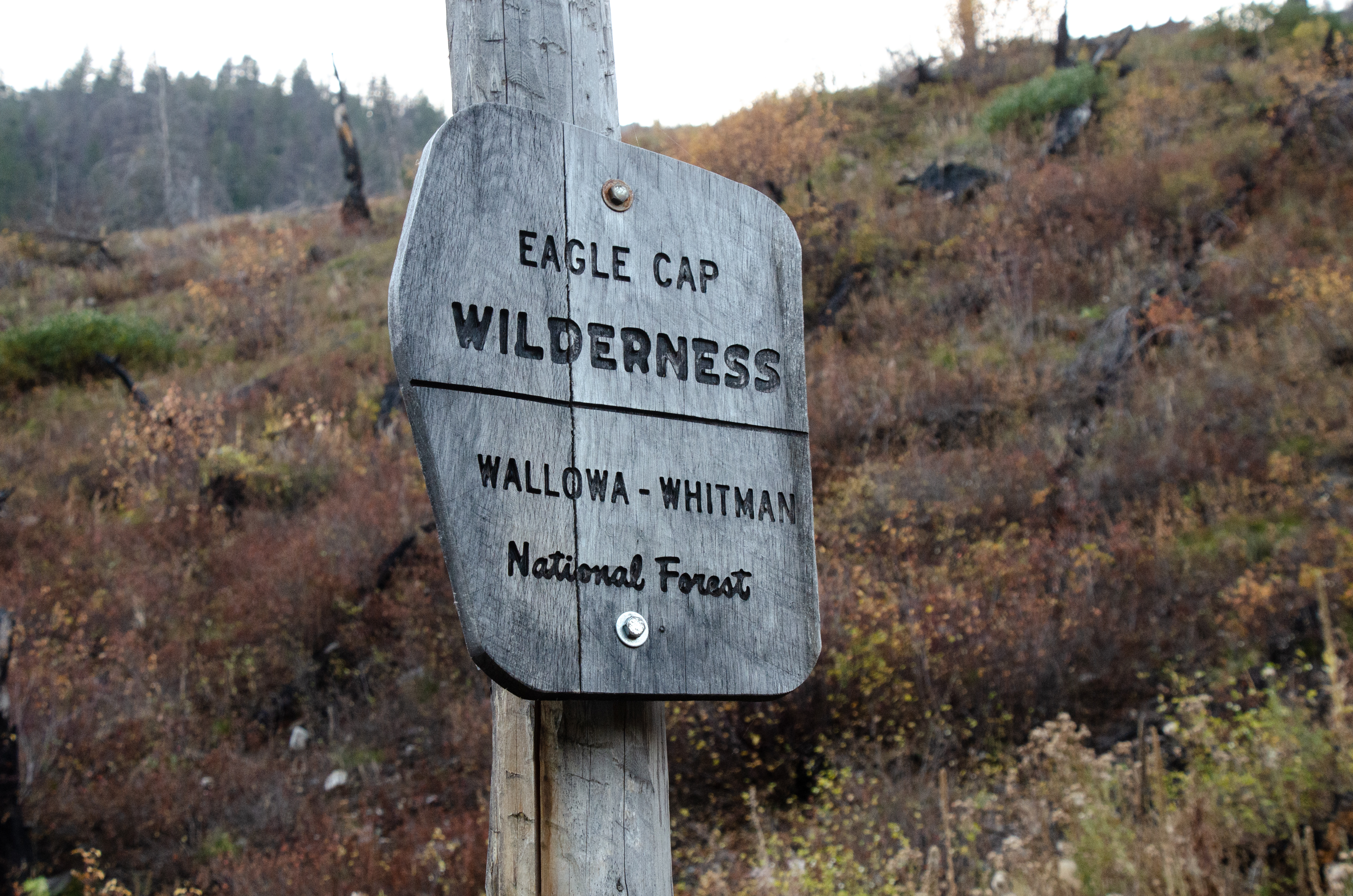
Sign marking the wilderness boundary on the Hurricane Creek Trail

== Wild and Scenic Rivers ==
Four designated Wild and Scenic Rivers originate in Eagle Cap Wilderness—the Lostine, Eagle Creek, Minam, and Imnaha.

=== Lostine River ===
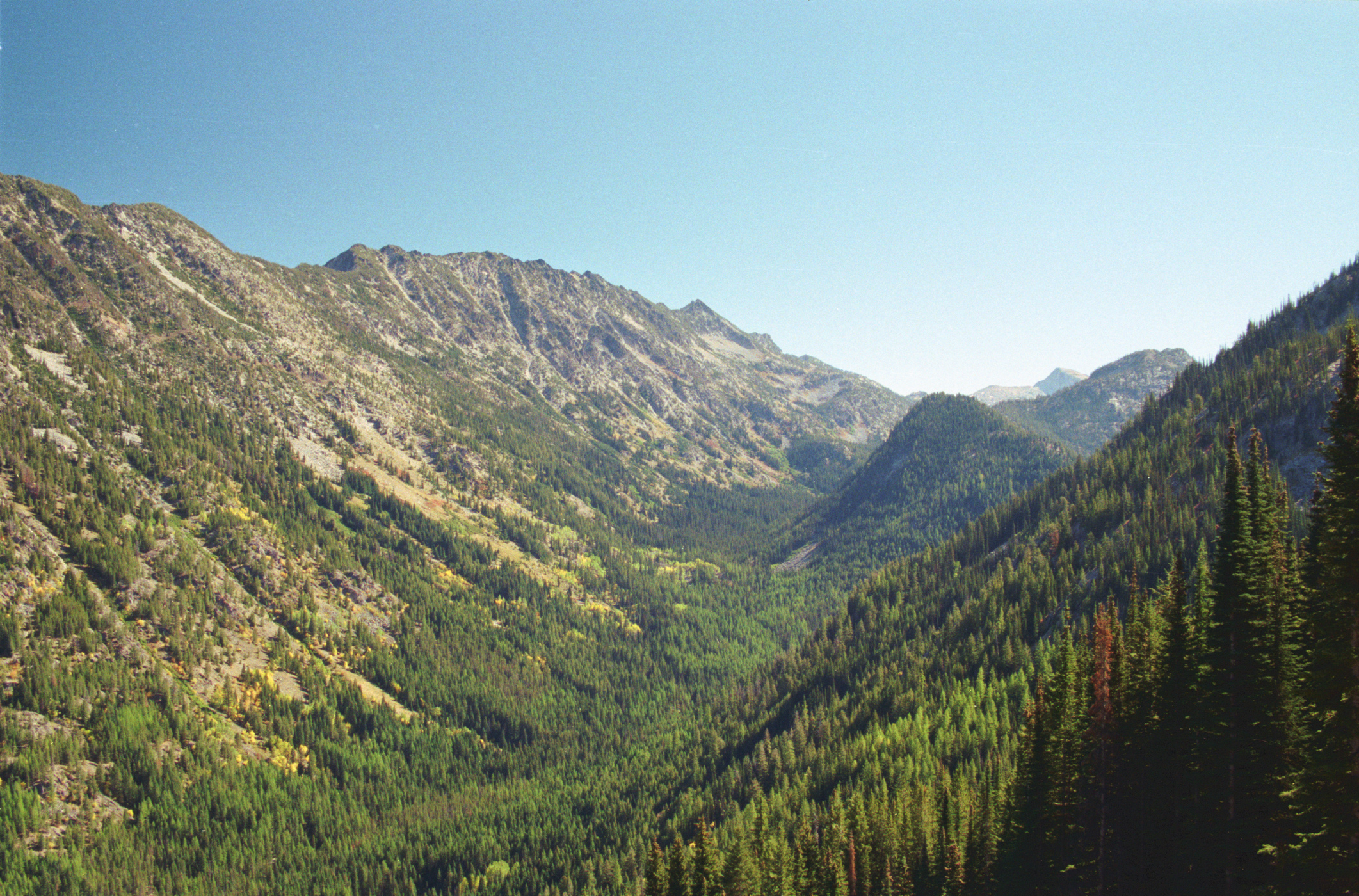
Lostine River valley in Eagle Cap Wilderness

16 miles (26 km) of the Lostine from its headwaters in the wilderness to the Wallowa–Whitman National Forest boundary are designated Wild and Scenic. Established in 1988, 5 miles (8 km) of the river are designated "wild" and 11 miles (18 km) are designated "recreational". A small portion of the river is on private property.

=== Eagle Creek ===
27 miles (43 km) of Eagle Creek from its output at Eagle Lake in the wilderness to the Wallowa–Whitman National Forest boundary at Skull Creek are designated Wild and Scenic. In 1988, 4 miles (6 km) of the river were designated "wild", 6 miles (10 km) are designated "scenic", and 17 miles (27 km) are designated "recreational".

=== Minam ===
39 miles (63 km) of the Minam River from its headwaters at the south end of Minam Lake to the wilderness boundary, one-half mile downstream from Cougar Creek, are designated Wild and Scenic. In 1988, all 39 miles (63 km) were designated "wild".

=== Imnaha ===
77 miles (124 km) of the Imnaha River from its headwaters are designated Wild and Scenic. The designation comprises the main stem from the confluence of the North and South Forks of the Imnaha River to its mouth, and the South Fork from its headwaters to the confluence with the main stem. In 1988, 15 miles (24 km) were designated "wild", 4 miles (6 km) were designated "scenic", and 58 miles (93 km) were designated "recreational", though only a portion of the Wild and Scenic Imnaha is located within Eagle Cap Wilderness.

== Lakes ==
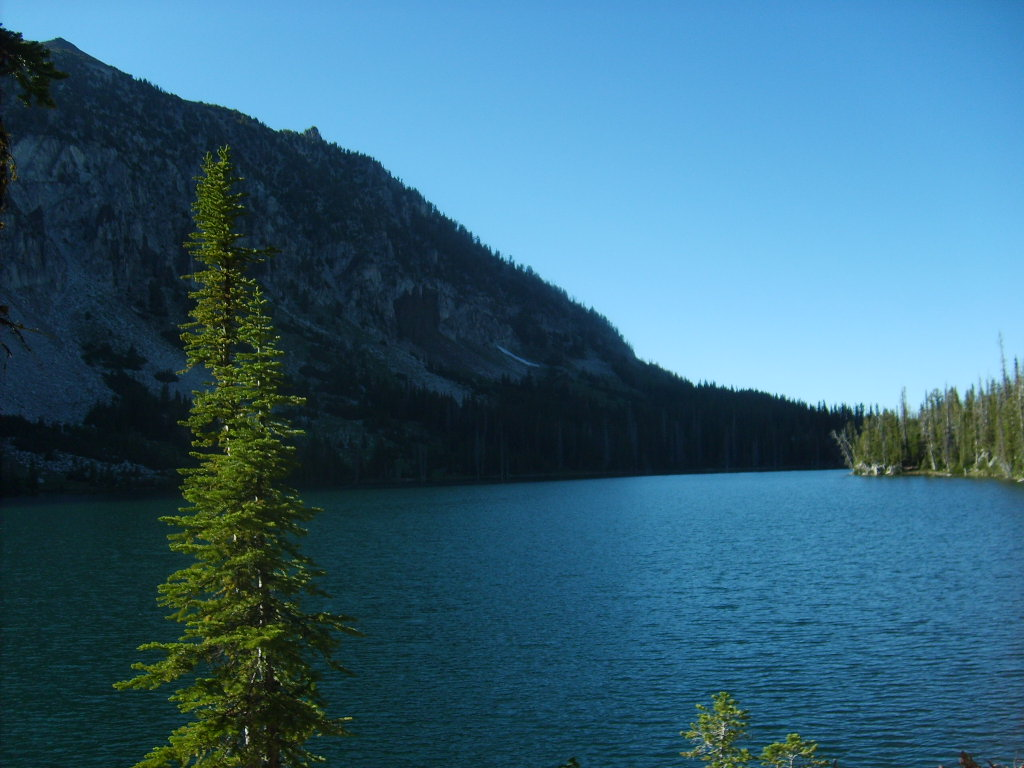
Aneroid Lake

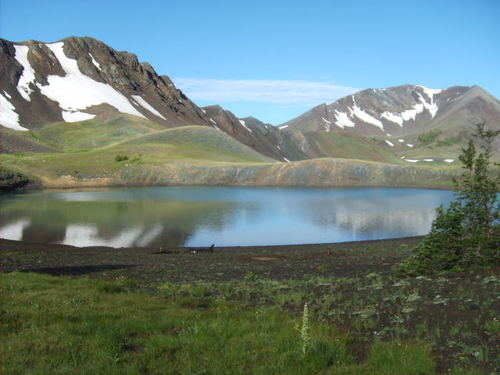
Dollar Lake

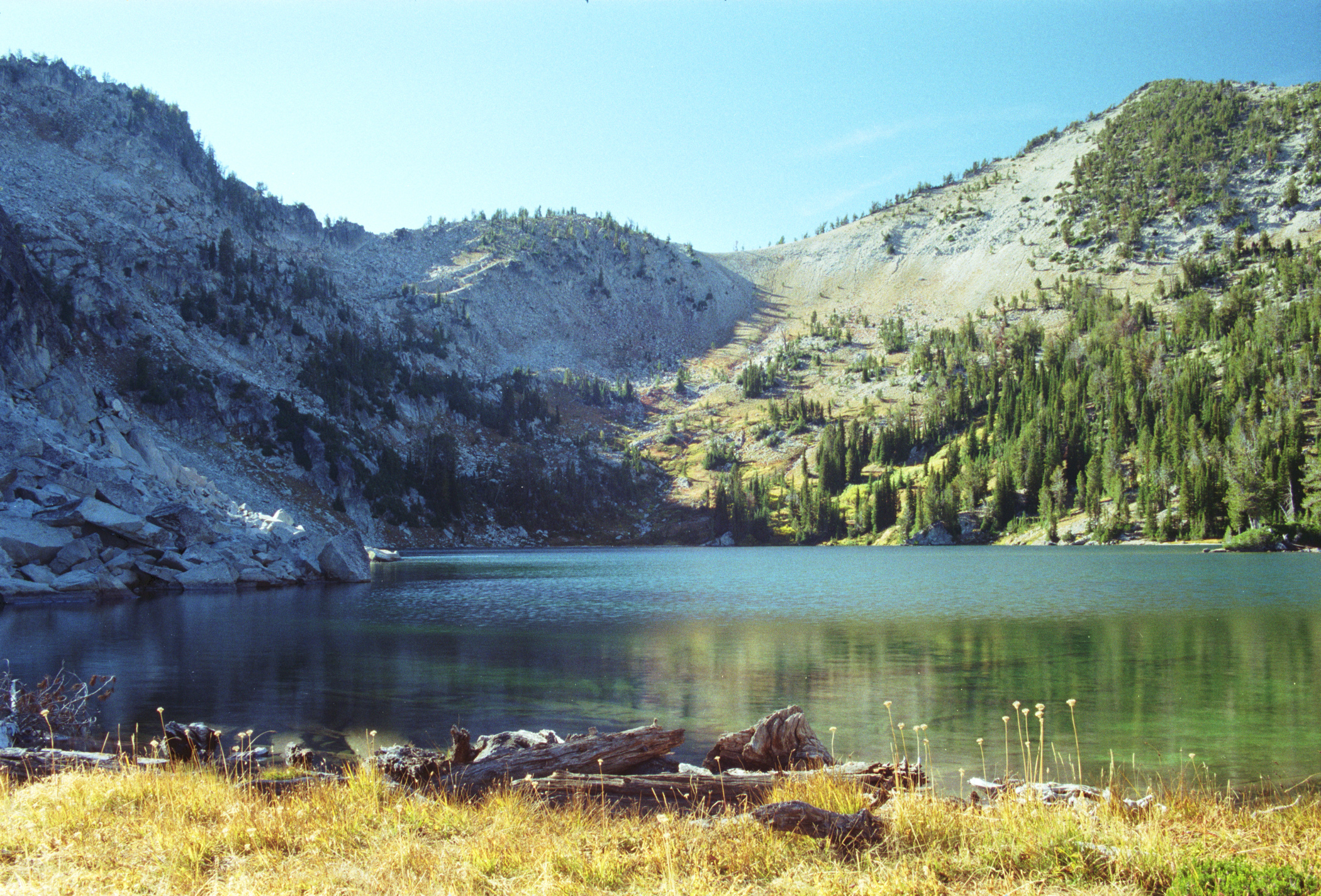
Maxwell Lake

Name	Elevation
Aneroid Lake	7,500 ft (2,300 m)
Bear Lake	7,905 ft (2,409 m)
Billy Jones Lake	8,400 ft (2,600 m)
Blue Lake	7,703 ft (2,348 m)
Bonny Lakes	7,840 ft (2,390 m)
Caught Two Lake	7,980 ft (2,430 m)
Cheval Lake	7,801 ft (2,378 m)
Chimney Lake	7,604 ft (2,318 m)
Crescent Lake	7,371 ft (2,247 m)
Deadman Lake	8,641 ft (2,634 m)
Dollar Lake	8,440 ft (2,570 m)
Douglas Lake	7,326 ft (2,233 m)
Echo Lake	8,372 ft (2,552 m)
Echo Lake	7,020 ft (2,140 m)
Frances Lake	7,705 ft (2,348 m)
Frazier lake	7,127 ft (2,172 m)
Glacier Lake	8,166 ft (2,489 m)
Green Lake	6,699 ft (2,042 m)
Hobo Lake	8,369 ft (2,551 m)
Horseshoe Lake	7,133 ft (2,174 m)
Ice Lake	7,849 ft (2,392 m)
Jewett Lake	8,240 ft (2,510 m)
John Henry Lake	7,168 ft (2,185 m)
Laverty Lake	7,500 ft (2,300 m)
Lee Lake	7,145 ft (2,178 m)
Legore Lake	8,950 ft (2,730 m)
Little Storm Lake	7,580 ft (2,310 m)
Maxwell Lake	7,729 ft (2,356 m)
Minam Lake	7,373 ft (2,247 m)
Mirror Lake	7,595 ft (2,315 m)
Moccasin Lake	7,473 ft (2,278 m)
Prospect Lake	8,328 ft (2,538 m)
Pocket Lake	8,225 ft (2,507 m)
Razz Lake	8,103 ft (2,470 m)
Roger Lake	7,360 ft (2,240 m)
Steamboat Lake	7,363 ft (2,244 m)
Swamp Lake	7,837 ft (2,389 m)
Tombstone Lake	7,421 ft (2,262 m)
Traverse Lake	7,723 ft (2,354 m)
Unit Lake	7,007 ft (2,136 m)
Upper Glacier Lake	8,206 ft (2,501 m)
Wood Lake	7,338 ft (2,237 m)

== See also ==
- List of U.S. Wilderness Areas
- List of old growth forests
