= Crataegus columbiana =

The name Crataegus columbiana is a source of considerable confusion. The species named by Thomas J. Howell is now considered to be the same as C. douglasii, named earlier, and the earlier name should be used instead. However, some varieties of C. columbiana have also been named that are not related to C. douglasii. C. columbiana has been used by some authors for Crataegus piperi Britton, which is now known as C. chrysocarpa var. piperi.

For C. columbiana var. chrysocarpa (Ashe) Dorn see C. chrysocarpa Ashe.

For C. columbiana var. piperi (Britton) Eggl. see C. chrysocarpa var. piperi (Britton) Kruschke.

For C. columbiana var. occidentalis (Britton) Dorn see C. succulenta Schrad. ex. Link (including C. macracantha var. occidentalis (Britton) Eggl.).
