= William Conklin Cusick =

American botanist (1842–1922)

- Born: February 21, 1842; Adams County, Illinois
- Died: October 7, 1922 (aged 80); Union, Oregon
- Scientific career
- Fields: Botany

William Conklin Cusick (February 21, 1842 – October 7, 1922) was an American botanist who specialized in the flora of the Pacific Northwest. His botanical knowledge was largely self-taught and he is considered one of the top three self-taught botanists of his era for the Pacific Northwest; the other two being Thomas Jefferson Howell and Wilhelm Nikolaus Suksdorf.

== Early life ==
Cusick was born to Robert George and Sarah H. Cusick on February 21, 1842, in Adams County, Illinois. He was named after his father's grandfather and was the oldest child.

Cusick's father and mother were of Scottish-Irish ancestry. His grandfather, Henry Cusick, immigrated to the United States from northern Ireland sometime after the Revolutionary War.

Cusick lived in Illinois with his family until 1853 when his family, including an aunt and uncle, cousins, and his grandmother, joined the westward emigration to Oregon on the Oregon Trail. His family settled on a 320 acres (130 ha) tract of land near Kingston in Linn County, Oregon.

Even though his father was a farmer, Cusick received a good education, attending a country school in Illinois from age four to eleven. When his family moved Kingston, he continued his education at the public school there. At age 20, he was enrolled at La Creole Academy in Dallas, Oregon, where he continued his education for a year and a half. He then spent two years teaching school. In 1864, he returned to school and went to Willamette University in Salem, Oregon. He was enrolled as a junior and studied mathematics (including higher algebra), physics, and geology.

After finishing the year at college, Cusick volunteered in the Union Army. He served as a sergeant in the 1st Oregon Infantry stationed at Fort Lapwai, Idaho, as part of the Quartermaster Corps. His unit was tasked with monitoring the Nez Perce Native Americans. During this time, because there were no disturbances from the Natives, Cusick was able to devote time to studying Asa Gray's First Lessons in Botany, his first introduction to botany. During his stint in the Army, he was also stationed for a time at Ukiah, Oregon, and Camp Polk near Sisters, Oregon. After he was discharged from the Army in 1866, he settled near Salem, Oregon, and returned to teaching. This did not last long because his hearing began to fail and he could no longer effectively teach.

== Career ==
In 1872, Cusick and his younger brother, Samuel Franklin (Frank) Cusick, moved to the Powder River Valley in eastern Oregon and set up homesteads on what would later be called Cusick Creek in the Thief Valley. For several years after the move, Cusick did little in the way of botany until a meeting with the wandering minister-botanist Dr. Reuben D. Nevius encouraged him to study botany more seriously. Nevius showed him how to collect scientifically useful specimens and keep records about them. Nevius also told Cusick where to send specimens to be identified and that there were many people who would be interested in buying pressed plant specimens. Inspired by this meeting, Cusick began sending specimens to Asa Gray at Harvard in 1878. Later that year, Gray honored him by naming Veronica cusickii after him, the first of many species that would be named after Cusick.

Initially, Cusick was only able to take short collecting trips into the Blue and Wallowa Mountains. His records mentions places in Baker and Union Counties such as Big Creek, Catherine Creek, Trout Creek, and the Snake River.

In November 1880, Asa Gray sent his assistant, Sereno Watson, to visit Cusick. Cusick apparently had aroused Gray's curiosity by sending him many new species. Watson had some difficulty on his journey locating Cusick, as one unfamiliar with the territory. He finally met Cusick and stayed with him for three days. While there, Watson showed Cusick how he could improve his collecting and records and gave Cusick his Botany of California dichotomous key. Cusick was further inspired by this visit and spent as much time as he could during the summer of 1881 collecting. That fall he sent over 200 specimens to Gray for identification.

Over the next few years, Cusick botanized several different locations. In 1882, he collected from the Imnaha River area. In 1885, he collected at Steens Mountain in Harney County in southeast Oregon. The first time that Cusick was able to devote an entire season to collecting was in 1886. He had had a severe attack of pleurisy the previous fall and was still suffering from its aftereffects. As such, he could not work on the ranch. That season he collected in the Powder River area, south to Malheur County, the Grande Ronde Valley, Cornucopia, and Hurricane Creek.

To support his collecting, Cusick would gather twelve samples of a specimen and sell duplicates. However, up until 1882, Cusick had not found buyers for his specimens. He was finally able to find some buyers during the winter of 1882 after communicating that summer with Harry Patterson, a printer of botanical labels from Oquawka, Illinois, who was also a collector.

In 1887, Cusick and his brother Frank, along with Frank's wife Rebecca and their three children, sold their homesteads in the Thief Valley and moved to nearby Jimmy Creek near Craig Mountain. Following this move, Cusick was less able to devote time to collecting for several years.

In October 1891 or 1892, Cusick married Emma A. Alger, who was the postmaster at Union, Oregon. She was a widow who had had eight children. Only two were still living at the time, Philip and Oscar. Emma died in February 1893 or 1894, leaving her two sons to Cusick's care. Dates here are uncertain because of conflicting records and Cusick never wrote about this part in his life. Later, Cusick supported Philip during the years when he attended Oregon Agricultural College, but Philip left to be married before he graduated. He also supported Oscar in college, but he also left before graduating to get married.

From 1887 to 1896, Cusick had done little collecting with only brief trips to Anthony Lakes, the Wallowas, and around the town of Union. His passion was rekindled in 1896 by the correspondence and encouragement of Charles Vancouver Piper, then botany professor at Washington State College. Piper visited Cusick at his ranch in August of that year and the two took a collecting trip into the Wallowas. This encouraged Cusick to resume collecting and the next year, 1897, he collected in Malheur and Harney Counties and in the Blue Mountains and Wallowas as well as several other places in northeast Oregon. In 1898, he visited Steens Mountain and Alvord Lake as well as the Wallowas and the Snake River. The next two years, Cusick continued to collect in northeastern Oregon and adjacent Idaho. In 1901, he took his stepson Oscar on a collecting trip in eastern and southeastern Oregon. By this time, he had become quite deaf and his eyesight was failing. This trip was quite taxing and they arrived back home in debt. The next year, Cusick, who was 60 years old, took his brother's son George on the longest trip of his career. They went to central and southwestern Oregon and covered an enormous area in the process.

After his trip to central and southwestern Oregon, Cusick did little collecting for several years. During this time, he mulled over his theory that the Blue Mountains and the Wallowa Mountains were two distinct ranges with distinct floras. From 1906 through 1910, he collected extensively in those areas, gathering specimens to test his theory. He wrote to the botany professor in 1907 at Washington State College, now Rolla Kent Beattie, that he hoped to compare his collections with the collection at the University of Oregon to test his theory. He made the trip in 1910 and spent the winter there, studying the specimens from west of the Cascades. He felt that the Blue Mountains had elements from west of the Cascades that the Wallowas did not. Sometime during his stay in Eugene, the curator of the University of Oregon herbarium, Albert R. Sweetser, offered to buy Cusick's collection, which by that time included over 10,000 sheets. Although the circumstances of the offer are not known, Cusick sold his collection to the university in 1911.

Between 1897 and 1910 Cusick organised his collected specimens in the form of exsiccata-like annual duplicate series with numbered printed labels and titles like Eastern Oregon Plants. Coll. Wm. C. Cusick. 1897 and The Mountain Plants of Eastern Oregon. Coll. Wm. C. Cusick. 1906.

Sometime between 1911 and 1913, Cusick moved to Roseburg, Oregon, and lived in a Soldier's Home. The move had been against the wishes of his family, but he wanted to be able to study the flora of Douglas County. The collecting that he did there was the beginning of his second collection.

== Later life ==
Around 1915, Cusick's brother Frank retired from ranching and moved to Union, Oregon. Cusick came back to eastern Oregon from Roseburg about the same time and joined him there. At this point, Cusick was no longer able to conduct long collecting trips because of his deafness and poor eyesight. In February 1916, he underwent cataract surgery, but these operations were largely unsuccessful and he remained mostly blind.

Piper, now working for the Agriculture Department in Washington D. C., wrote to Cusick in 1916, hoping that he could help clear up some of his more obscure collection locations. In attempt to facilitate this process, Piper sent his colleague, Willard Webster Eggleston, to visit Cusick. Cusick, although quite deaf and mostly blind, was inspired by the visitor and insisted that they go to Strawberry Lake to find a certain red monkeyflower. Two years later, in 1918, Eggleston invited Cusick to be a part of a team that would survey the flora of the Blue Mountains. Unable to find someone who could be eyes and ears for Cusick, Cusick's nephew declined the offer. However, even with his handicaps, Cusick continued to assist Piper in locating plants that he had once collected, telling Piper the location of a rare grass in 1919. Piper visited Cusick one last time in the summer of 1921 and they went on a short collecting trip to Hot Lake outside of Union.

Cusick suffered a stroke in the fall of 1921 and shortly thereafter wrote to Washington State College to offer them his second collection for $500. He was visited by Harold St. John, the curator of the college's herbarium, and they talked at length of collecting and botany. St. John examined the now 6000-sheet collection and authorized the purchase. The Oregon State College also received duplicates of his collections from when he was in Roseburg.

Cusick's final communication with Piper was in 1922. Piper was trying to assemble a list of the plants of the Blue Mountains and wanted Cusick's list, but Cusick was unable to find it.

Cusick died on October 7, 1922, in his brother's home in Union, Oregon. He was survived by his brother Frank, a sister in Scio, Oregon, and two half-sisters, one in Idaho and the other in Union. The funeral was held the next day at the Union Presbyterian Church. Cusick was later eulogized by St. John and Erwin F. Lange. Lange wrote of him: "No collector of national note was more modest than Cusick. He avoided publicity and only his extant letters and two short articles leave a record of his work. His outstanding work in botany was well known and understood by botanists of America and Europe, yet his neighbors were hardly aware of his greatness." Prior to Cusick's death, his pastor had requested an account of his life and Eggleston produced a short sketch that emphasized Cusick's contributions to botany. Cusick was buried as a soldier in the Union Cemetery lot 43 with the inscription on the headstone reading: Sergeant W.C. Cusick, Company F, 1st Oregon Infantry.

== Legacy ==
Cusick's two large collections that he sold to the University of Oregon and Washington State College and the duplicates that he sold to the Oregon State College contain a large majority of his collection work. The specimens he sent to Harvard include nearly 300 specimens and are also important parts of his work. His personal relationships with Gray, Piper, Watson, and others helped his influence among the botany world as they and many others after them named plants after him. Twenty-seven different plants, including one genus, are named after him. They include Cusick's sunflower, Cusick's stickseed, Cusick's camas, Cusick's shooting-star, and Cusickiella just to name a few.

Cusick's legacy extended beyond the botany world and in 1929, the US Geographic Board named Cusick Mountain in the Wallowa National Forest after him. Four different creeks in the Pacific Northwest bear his family name: one in Pend Oreille County, Washington, one in Union County, Oregon, one in Jackson County, Oregon, and one in Bannock County, Idaho.

== Bibliography ==
- Love, Rhoda M. (2007). "Pioneer Botanist William Cusick: His Dark and Silent World" (PDF). Kalmiopsis. 14.
- St. John, Harold (July 1923). "William Conklin Cusick". Rhodora. 25 (295).
- Lange, Erwin F. (June 1956). "Pioneer Botanists of the Pacific Northwest". Oregon Historical Quarterly. 57 (2): 108–124. JSTOR 20612252.
- "Cusick Creek". Geographic Names Information System. USGS.
- "HUH Databases Botanist Search". Harvard University Herbaria and Libraries. Harvard University.
- Love, Rhoda M. (Fall 1998). "Wilhelm Nikolaus Suksdorf (1850-1932) Pioneer Botanist of the Pacific Northwest" (PDF). Pacific Northwest Quarterly: 176.
