= Cusick Mountain =

Mountain peak in Oregon, United States

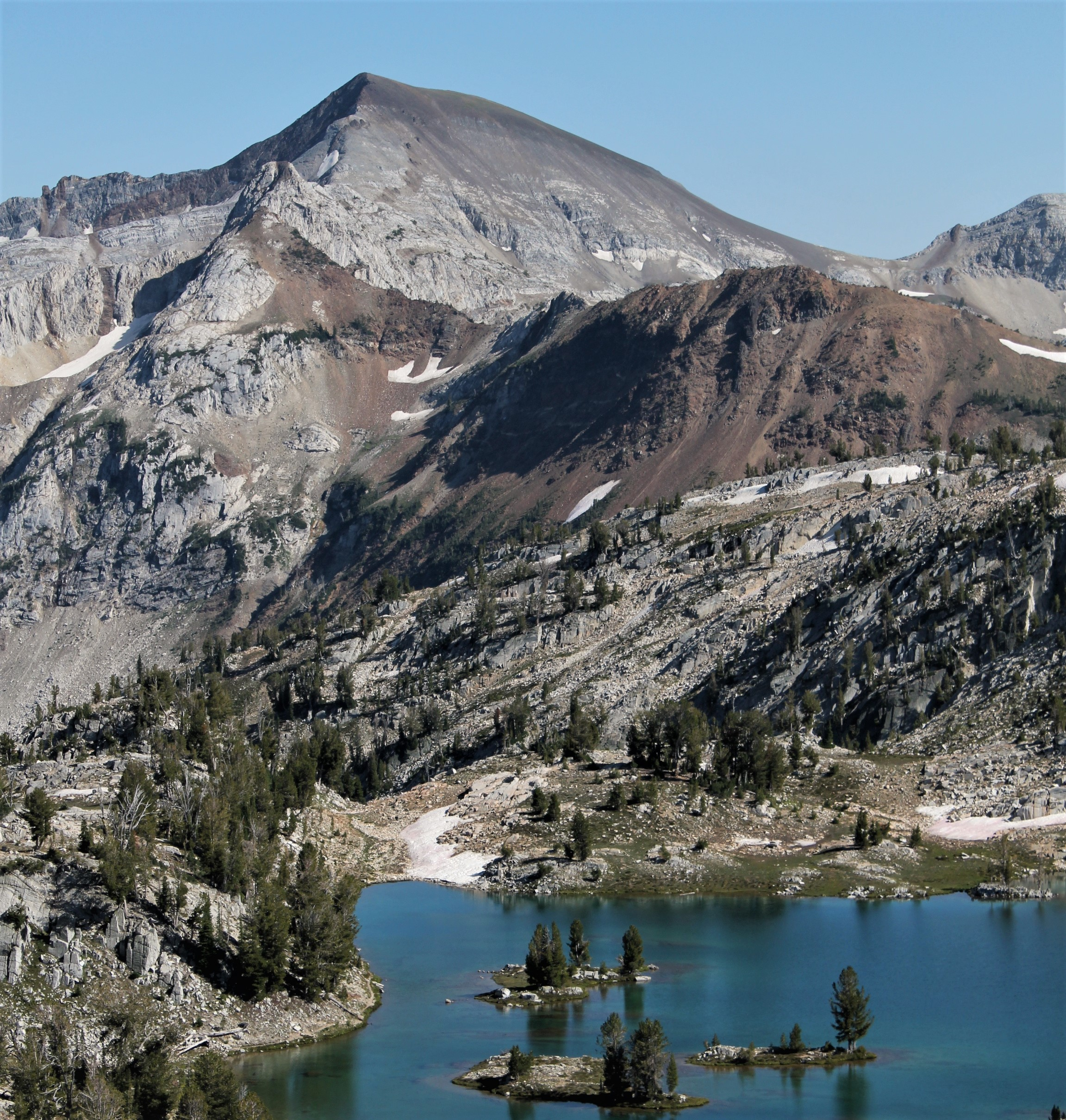
- Northwest aspect, beyond Glacier Lake

Highest point
- Elevation: 9,518 ft (2,901 m)
- Prominence: 878 ft (268 m)
- Parent peak: Eagle Cap (9,577 ft)
- Isolation: 3.25 mi (5.23 km)
- Coordinates: 45°08′14″N 117°14′46″W

Naming
- Etymology: William Conklin Cusick

Geography
- Location within Oregon Location within the United States
- Location: Eagle Cap Wilderness
- Country: United States of America
- State: Oregon
- County: Wallowa
- Parent range: Wallowa Mountains
- Topo map: USGS Aneroid Mountain

Geology
- Rock type(s): basaltic, granitic

Cusick Mountain is a summit located in Wallowa County, Oregon, US.

== Description ==
Cusick Mountain is located at the center of the Wallowa Mountains and is set within the Eagle Cap Wilderness, on land managed by Wallowa–Whitman National Forest. The remote 9,518-foot elevation (2,901 m) peak ranks as the 17th-highest mountain in Oregon. The peak is situated 2.6 miles southeast of Glacier Peak and 3.3 miles southeast of Eagle Cap which is the nearest higher neighbor. Precipitation runoff from the mountain's north slope drains into headwaters of the West Fork Wallowa River, and all other slopes into headwaters of the Imnaha River. Topographic relief is significant as the summit rises 2,900 feet (880 meters) above South Fork Imnaha River in 1.5 mile. The summit is composed of Columbia River basalt which overlays limestone and Mesozoic granodiorite of the Wallowa Batholith. A limber pine growing at the 8,000-foot level on the mountain's southeast slope is likely the oldest living thing in Oregon and ranks third in the limber pine size category in the United States.

== Etymology ==
This landform's toponym was proposed by Willard Webster Eggleston and officially adopted May 1, 1929, by the United States Board on Geographic Names to remember William Conklin Cusick (1842–1922), an Oregonian and pioneer botanist who specialized in the flora of the Pacific Northwest and in particular the Wallowas and Blue Mountains. The resident of Union, Oregon, made the first botanical studies of the Wallowas by collecting and classifying plants from 1896 through 1910. There are numerous plants with scientific names ending with cusickii which are named in his honor.

== Climate ==
Based on the Köppen climate classification, Cusick Mountain is located in a subarctic climate zone characterized by long, usually very cold winters, and mild summers. Winter temperatures can drop below −10 °F with wind chill factors below −20 °F. Most precipitation in the area is caused by orographic lift. Thunderstorms are common in the summer.

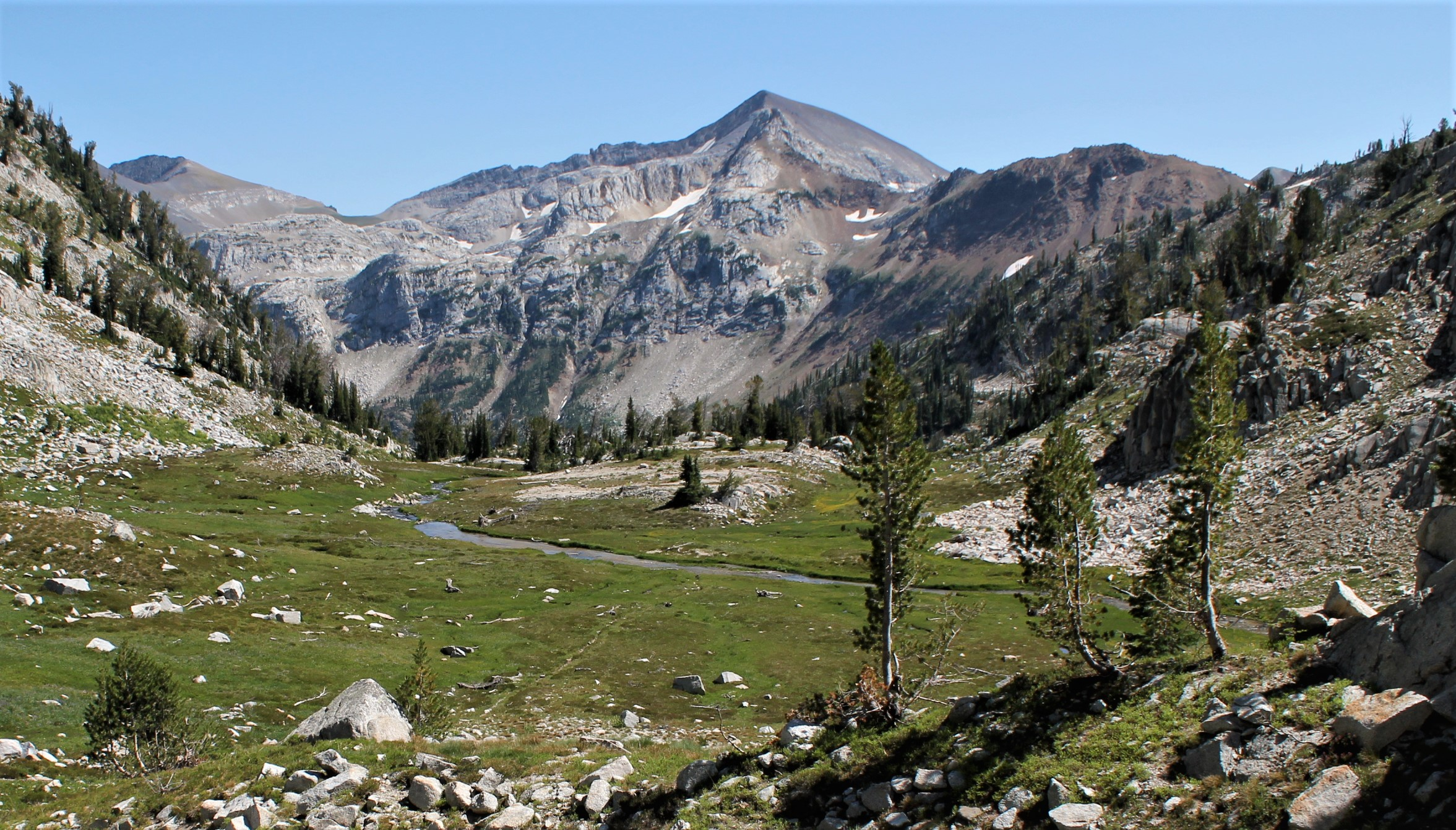
Cusick Mountain from northwest

== See also ==
- List of mountain peaks of Oregon
