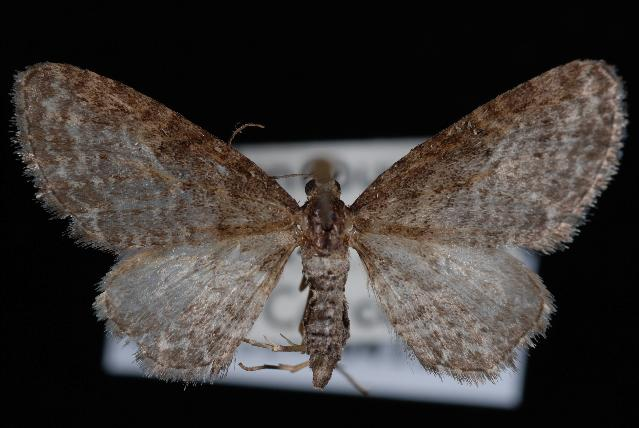

Scientific classification
- Domain: Eukaryota
- Kingdom: Animalia
- Phylum: Arthropoda
- Class: Insecta
- Order: Lepidoptera
- Family: Geometridae
- Genus: Eupithecia
- Species: E. olivacea

Binomial name
- Eupithecia olivacea Taylor, 1906

= Eupithecia olivacea =

Species of moth

Eupithecia olivacea is a moth in the family Geometridae first described by Taylor in 1906. It is found in North America from British Columbia south through Washington and Oregon to California.

The forewings are uniform olive brown. Adults are on wing from early March to April.

The larvae feed on Abies grandis, Abies amabilis, Abies lasiocarpa, Crataegus douglasii, Pseudotsuga menziesii var. glauca, Picea sitchensis and Tsuga heterophylla.
