= Belle Greene =

Belle Greene may refer to:

- Belle da Costa Greene (1883–1950), librarian to J. P. Morgan
- Belle C. Greene (1842–1926), American author
