= Benson Glacier (Oregon) =

Glacier in Oregon, United States

- Location within Oregon
- Type: Mountain glacier
- Location: Wallowa Mountains, Wallowa County, Oregon, United States
- Coordinates: 45°09′45″N 117°18′09″W
- Terminus: Talus and rock debris
- Status: Stagnant icefield

Benson Glacier was a glacier in the U.S. state of Oregon and the last active glacier in the Wallowa Mountains. Situated at an elevation generally above 8,500 feet (2,600 m) on the northeastern slopes Glacier Peak, a subpeak of Eagle Cap, it is now a stagnant ice mass. The glacier was named in honor of Frank W. Benson, former Governor of Oregon during an expedition in 1914. In the 1980s, when it was still an active glacier, Benson Glacier had an estimated area of 0.016 square kilometers.

Benson Glacier was the last remaining remnant of Wallowa Glacier which extended 20 mi (32 km), creating the lateral moraines that created Wallowa Lake during the Last Glacial Maximum. Its ice is estimated to have been 2,000 ft (610 m) thick in places. The West Fork of the Wallowa River occupies the valley it left behind.

== See also ==
- List of glaciers in the United States
