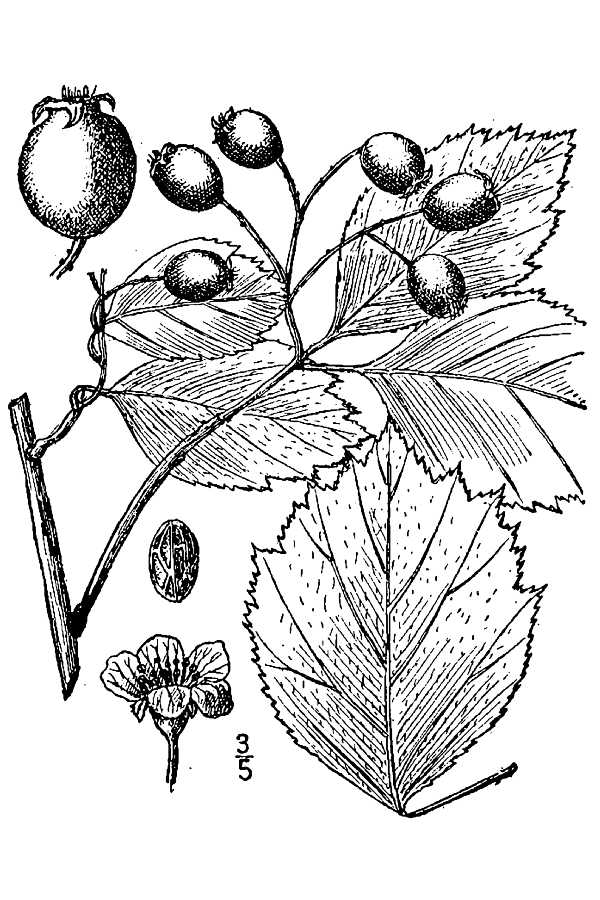

Conservation status
- Least Concern (IUCN 3.1)

Scientific classification
- Kingdom: Plantae
- Clade: Tracheophytes
- Clade: Angiosperms
- Clade: Eudicots
- Clade: Rosids
- Order: Rosales
- Family: Rosaceae
- Genus: Crataegus
- Species: C. douglasii

Binomial name
- Crataegus douglasii Lindl.
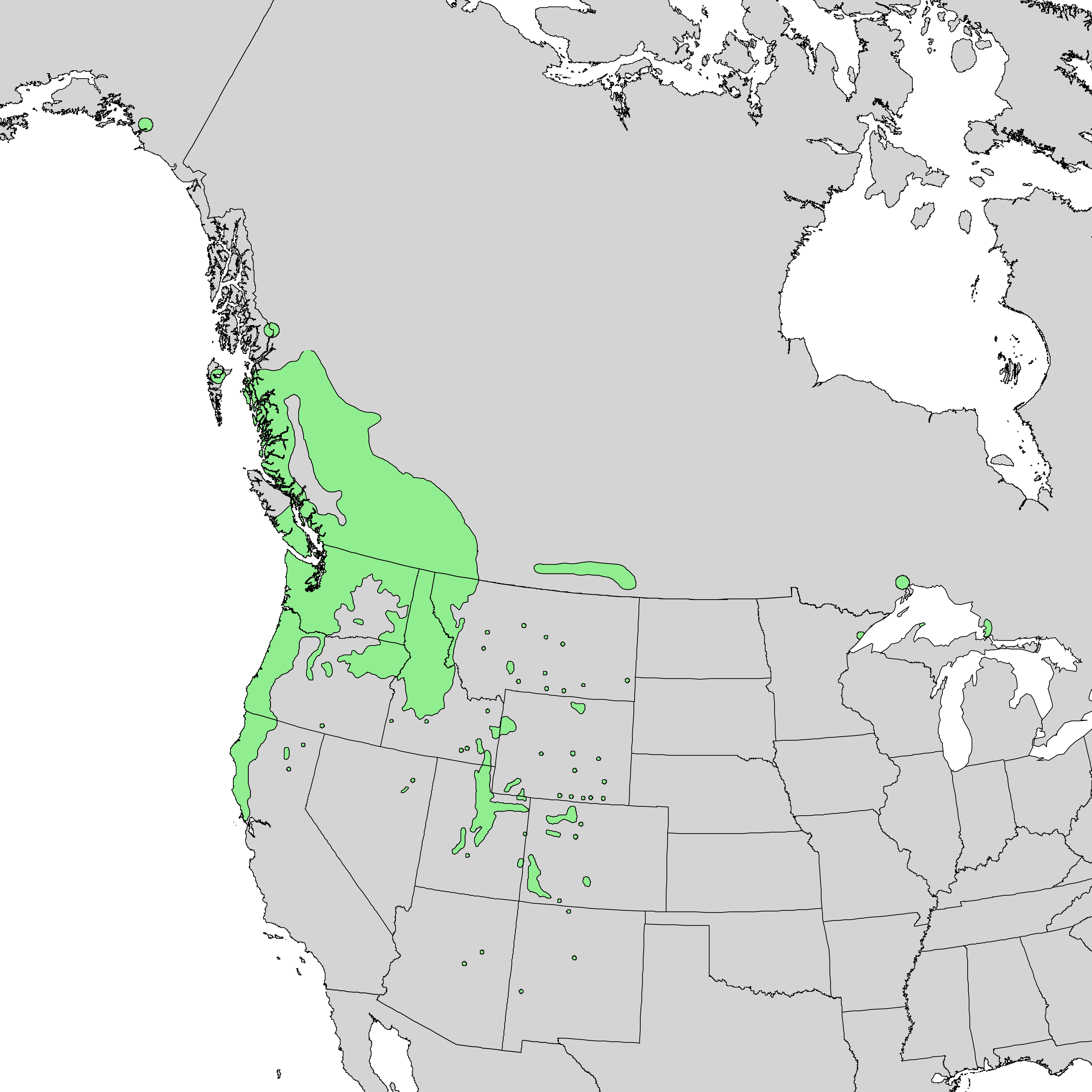
- Natural range of Crataegus douglasii

Synonyms
- C. brockwayae Sarg. C. columbiana Howell

= Crataegus douglasii =

Species of hawthorn

Crataegus douglasii is a North American species of hawthorn known by the common names black hawthorn and Douglas' thornapple. It is most abundant in the Pacific Northwest.

== Description ==
Crataegus douglasii is a compact erect bushy shrub growing to 8–9 metres (26–30 feet) tall with a trunk of up to 10 centimetres (4 inches) thick. It is covered in fan-shaped green leaves about 2.5–5 cm (1–2 in) long with teeth along the distal margin. Thorns along the branches are 1–2.5 cm long.

White flowers with greenish centers grow in bunches at the ends of each thin branch. The fruit is a blackish pome up to about 1 cm across, containing 3–5 rocklike seeds.

== Taxonomy ==
The species is named after David Douglas, who collected seed from the plant during his botanical explorations.

Formerly placed within the species, Crataegus douglasii var. duchesnensis is now considered to be a synonym of Crataegus saligna.

== Distribution and habitat ==
The thorny shrub is native to northern and western North America, most abundantly in the Pacific Northwest. It grows in varied habitats from forest to scrubland, including moist open places, forest edges, thickets, shorelines, streamside areas, roadsides and coastal bluffs at low to middle elevations.

== Ecology ==
The foliage is browsed by cattle and sheep. Various birds, including quail, the Hungarian partridge, and ring-necked pheasant feed on the berries, as do bears and other animals. Magpies nest in the branches. The species is a larval host to the gray hairstreak, mourning cloak, pale tiger swallowtail, and western tiger swallowtail.

== Uses ==
The edible fruits were a good food source for Native American peoples such as the Cheyenne and Nlaka'pamux. The Syilx/Okanagan use the ripening of the black hawthorn as an indicator that, in the highlands, black mountain huckleberries are ripening, too.

== Gallery ==
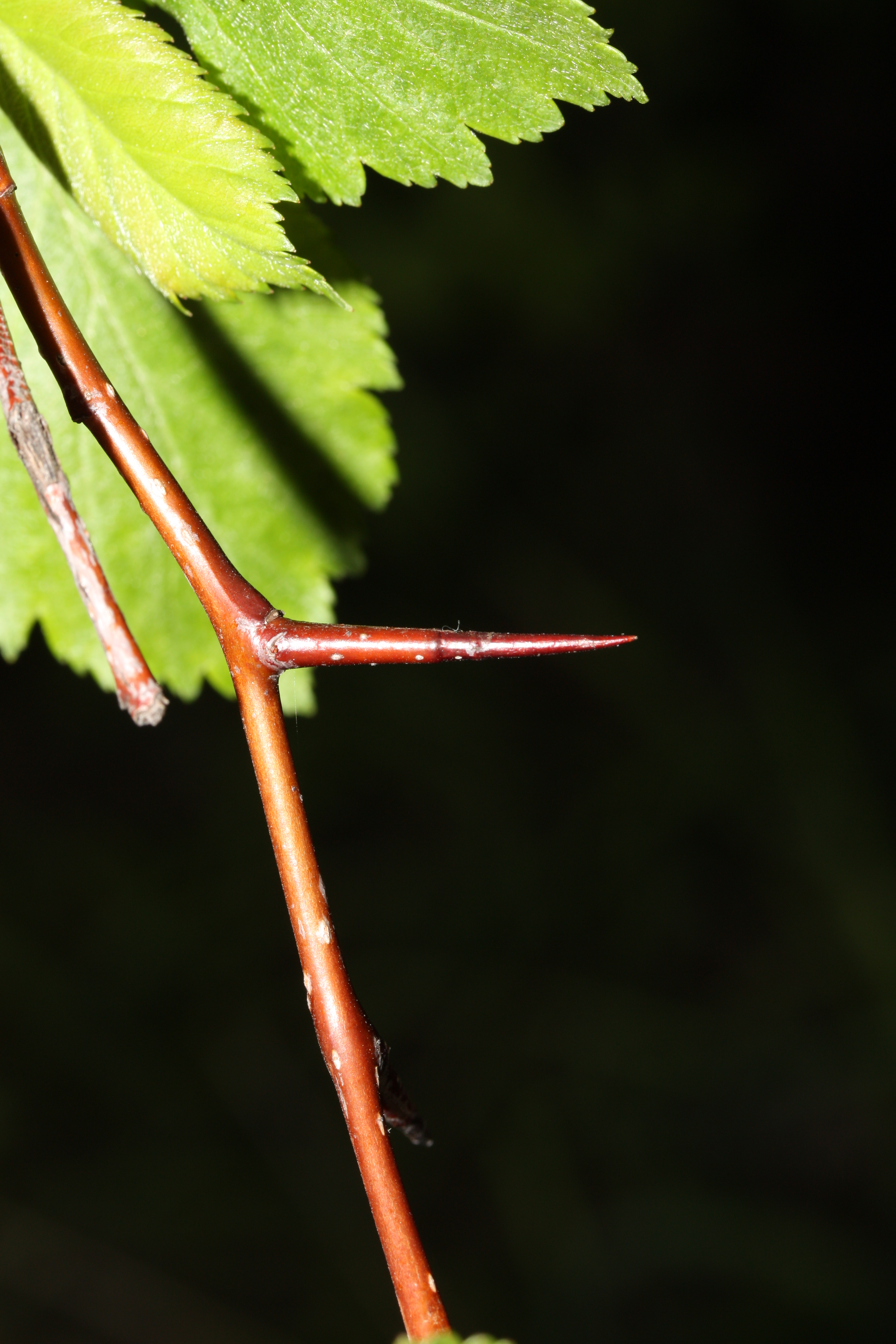
Straight, stout thorns are one to two centimeters long.

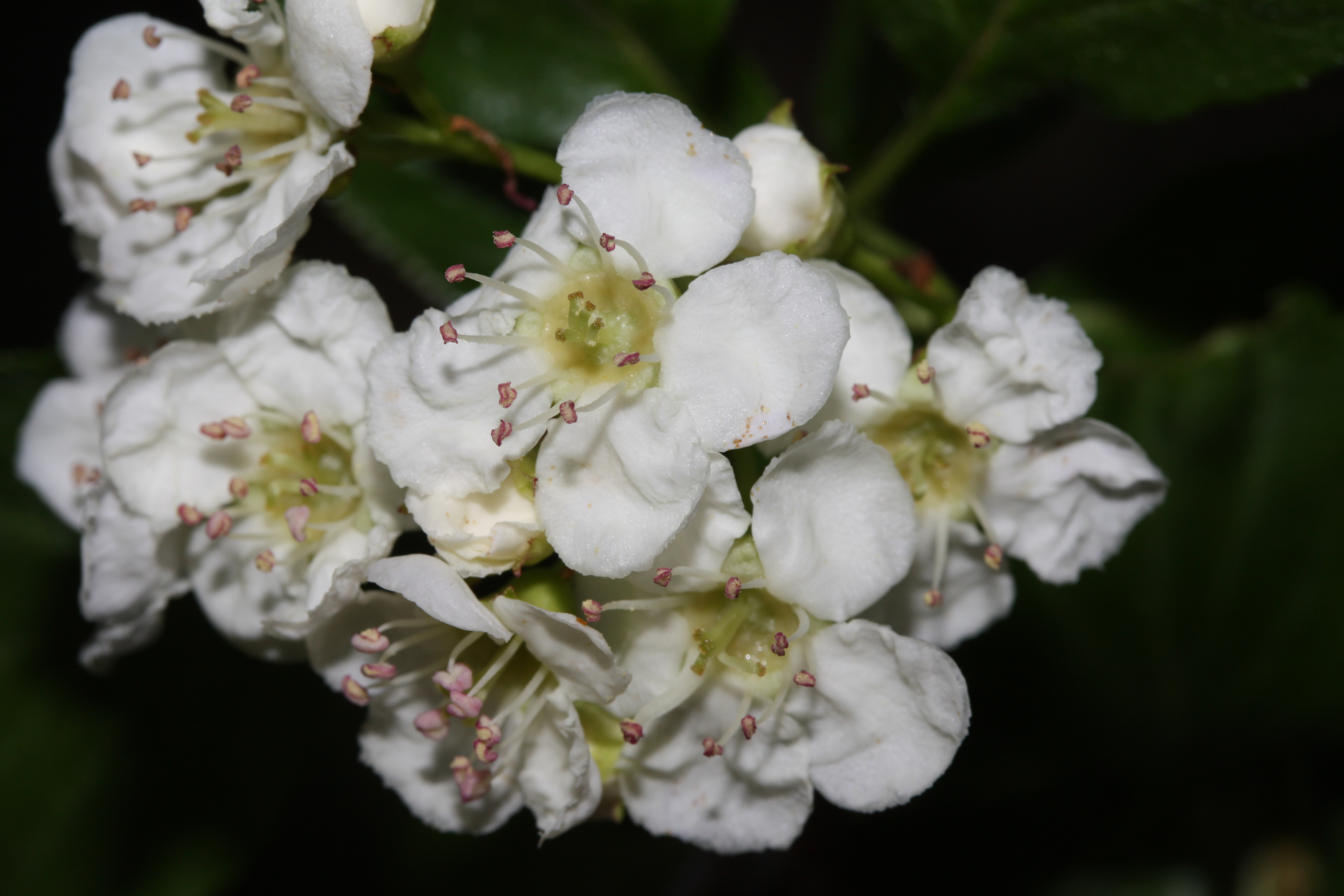
The white flowers have greenish centers.

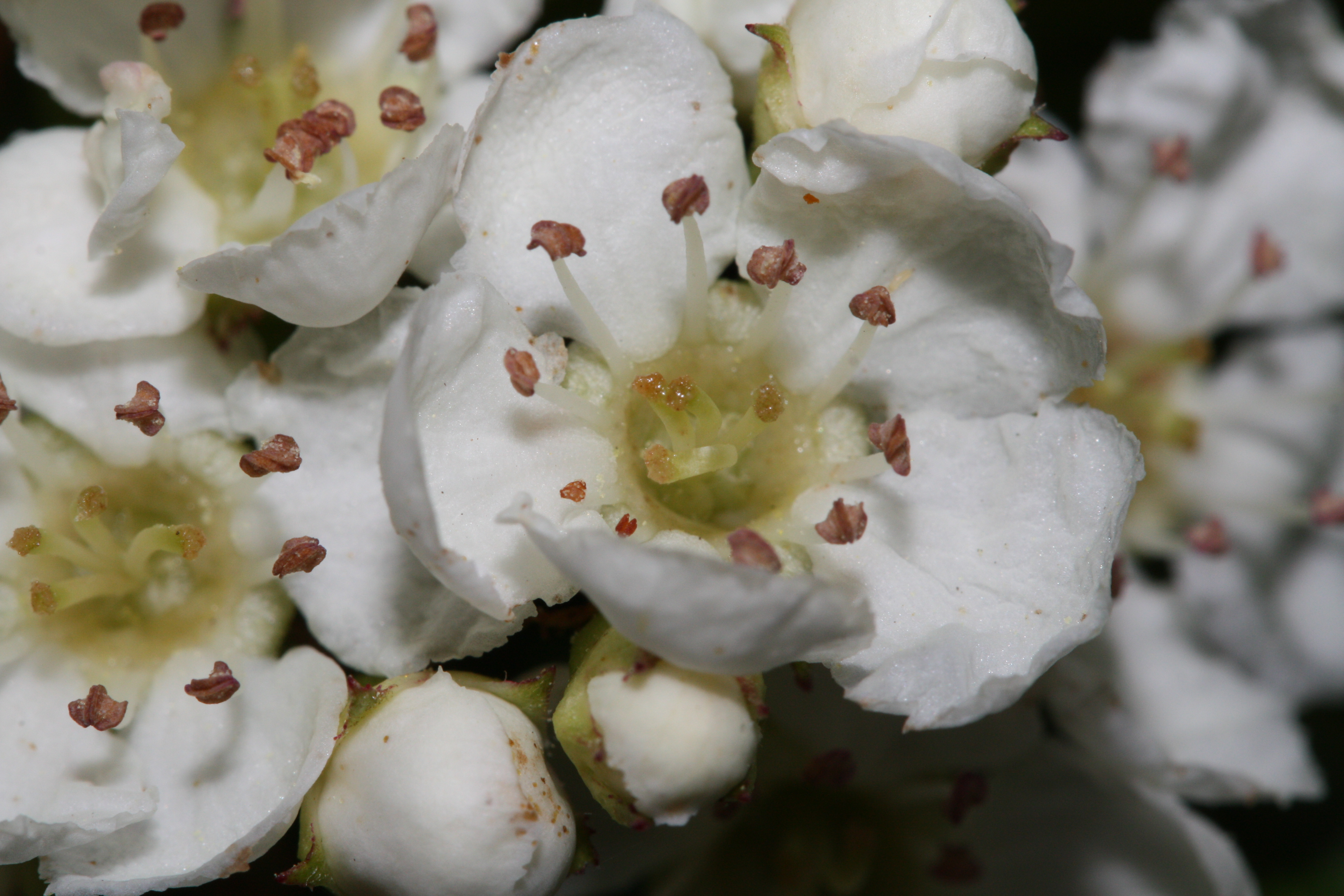
Crataegus douglasii

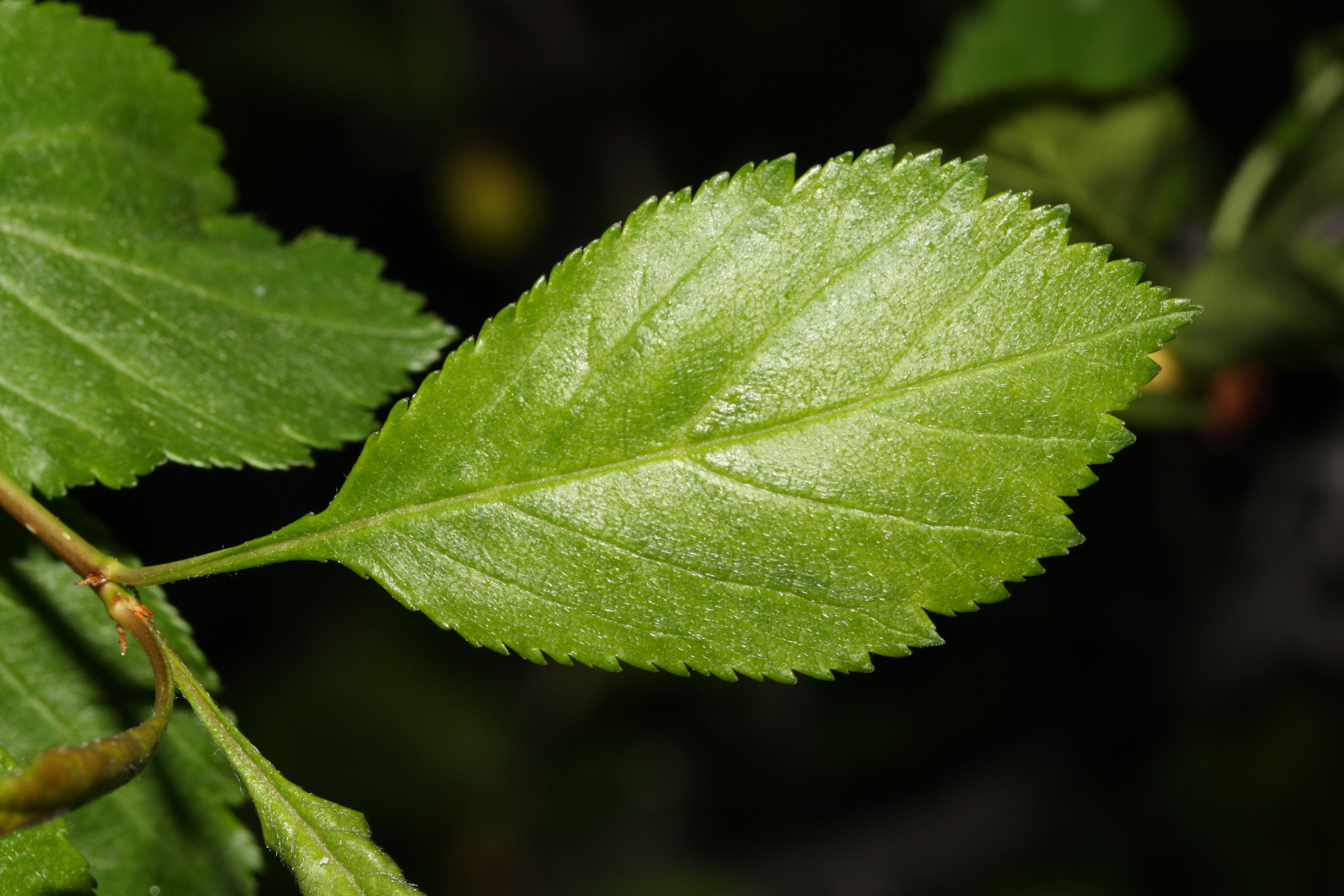
The leaf margin is toothed and usually slightly lobed.

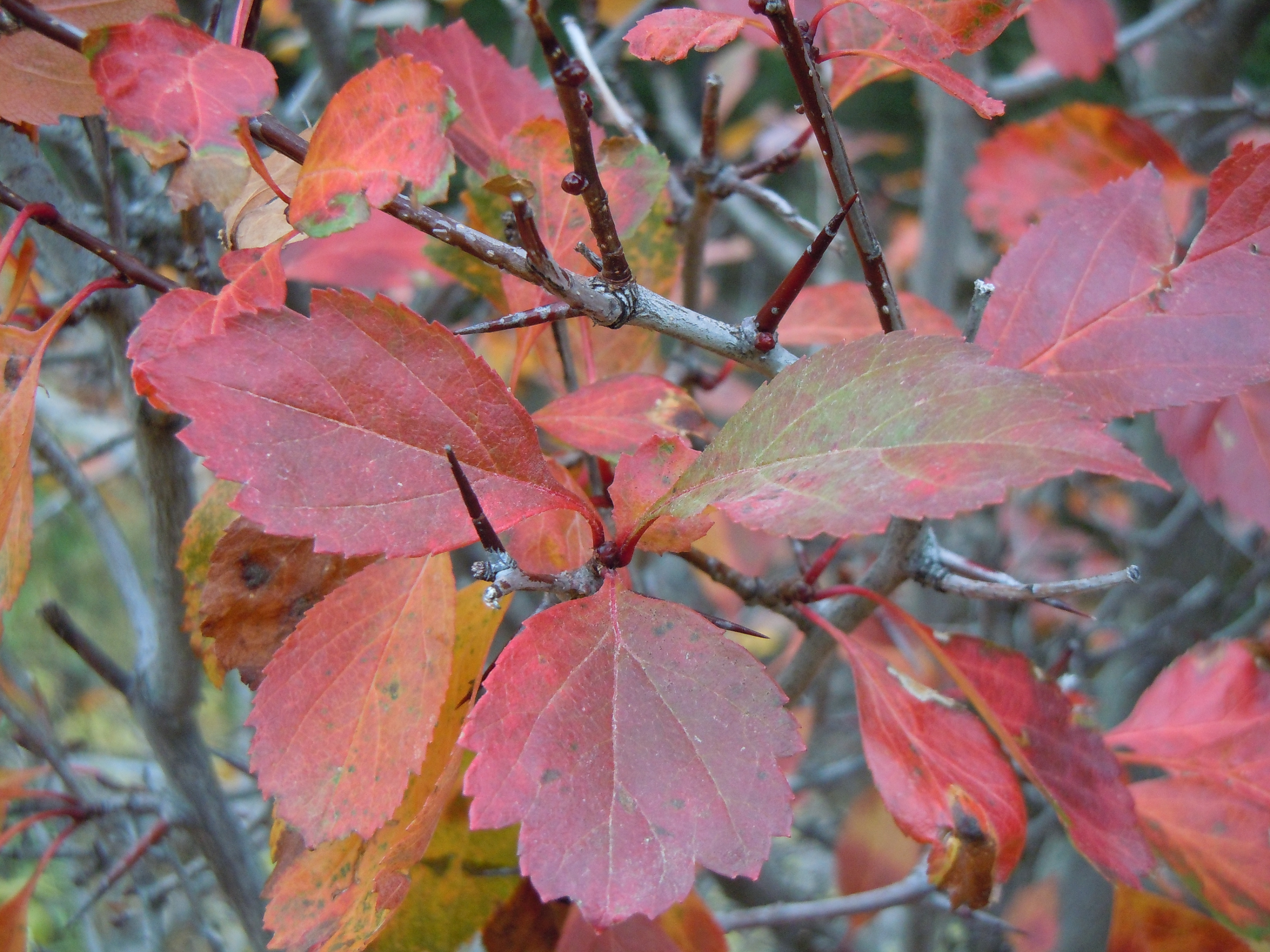
Crataegus douglasii leaves changing color in fall.

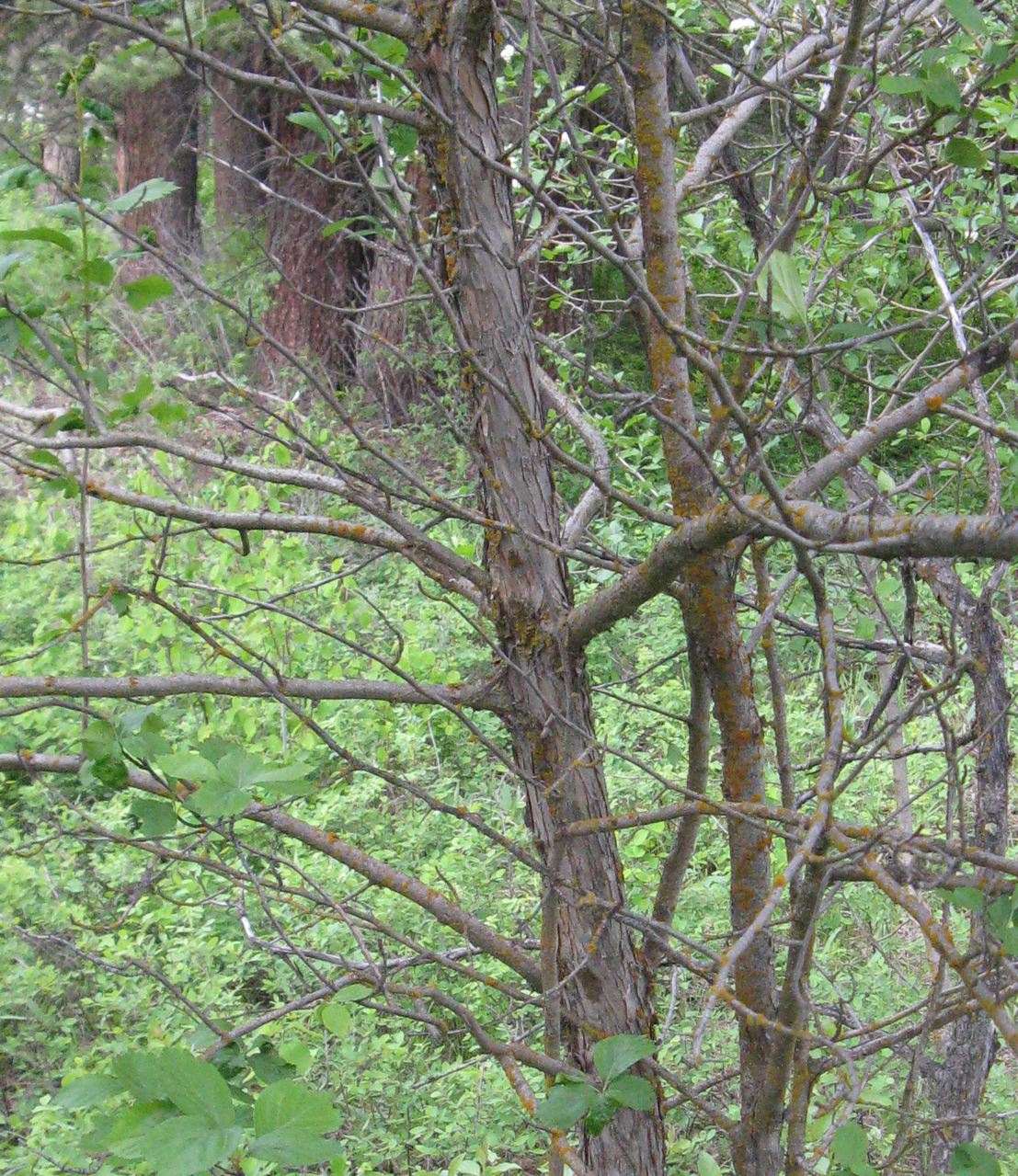
The mature bark is grey and rough.

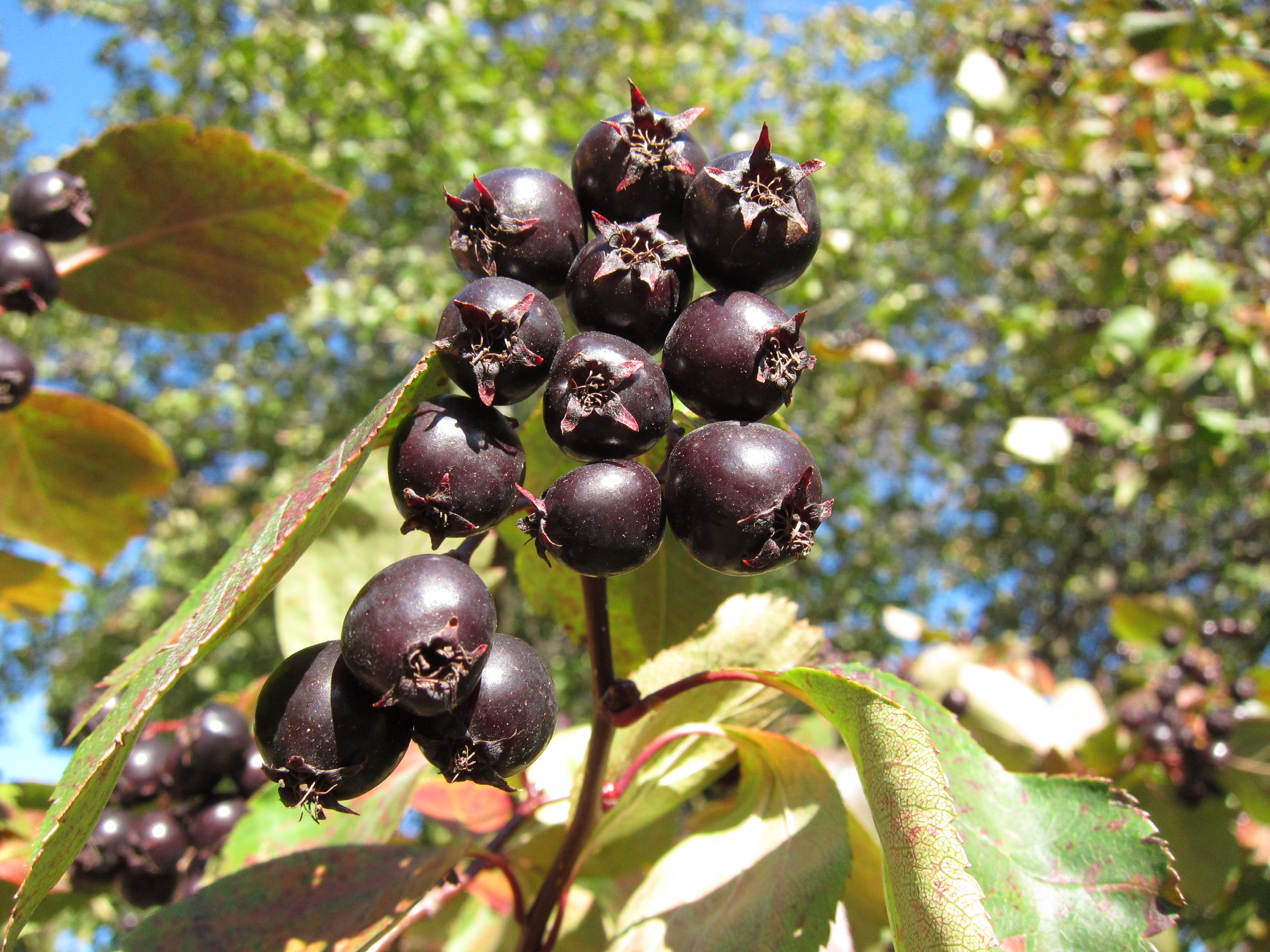

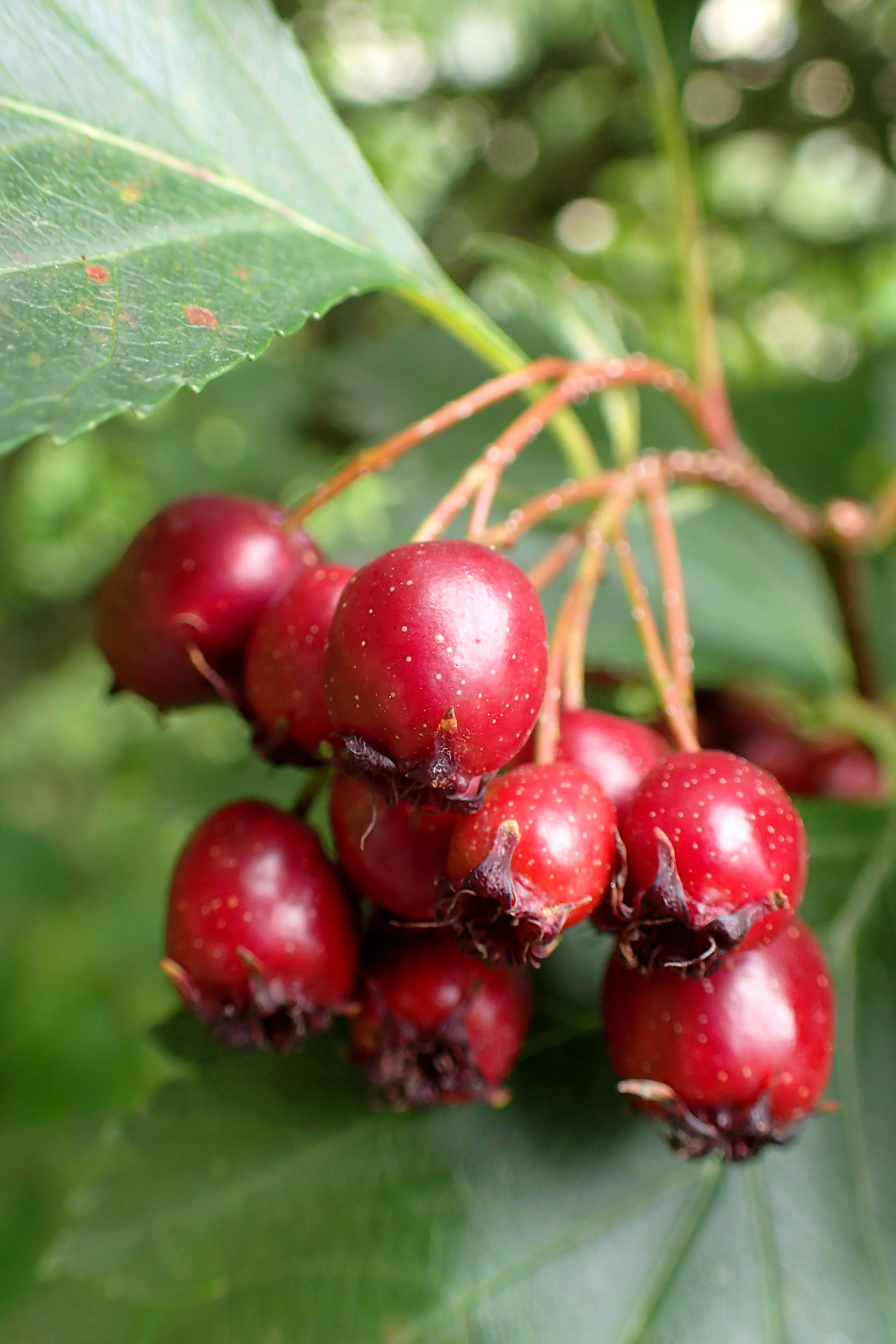

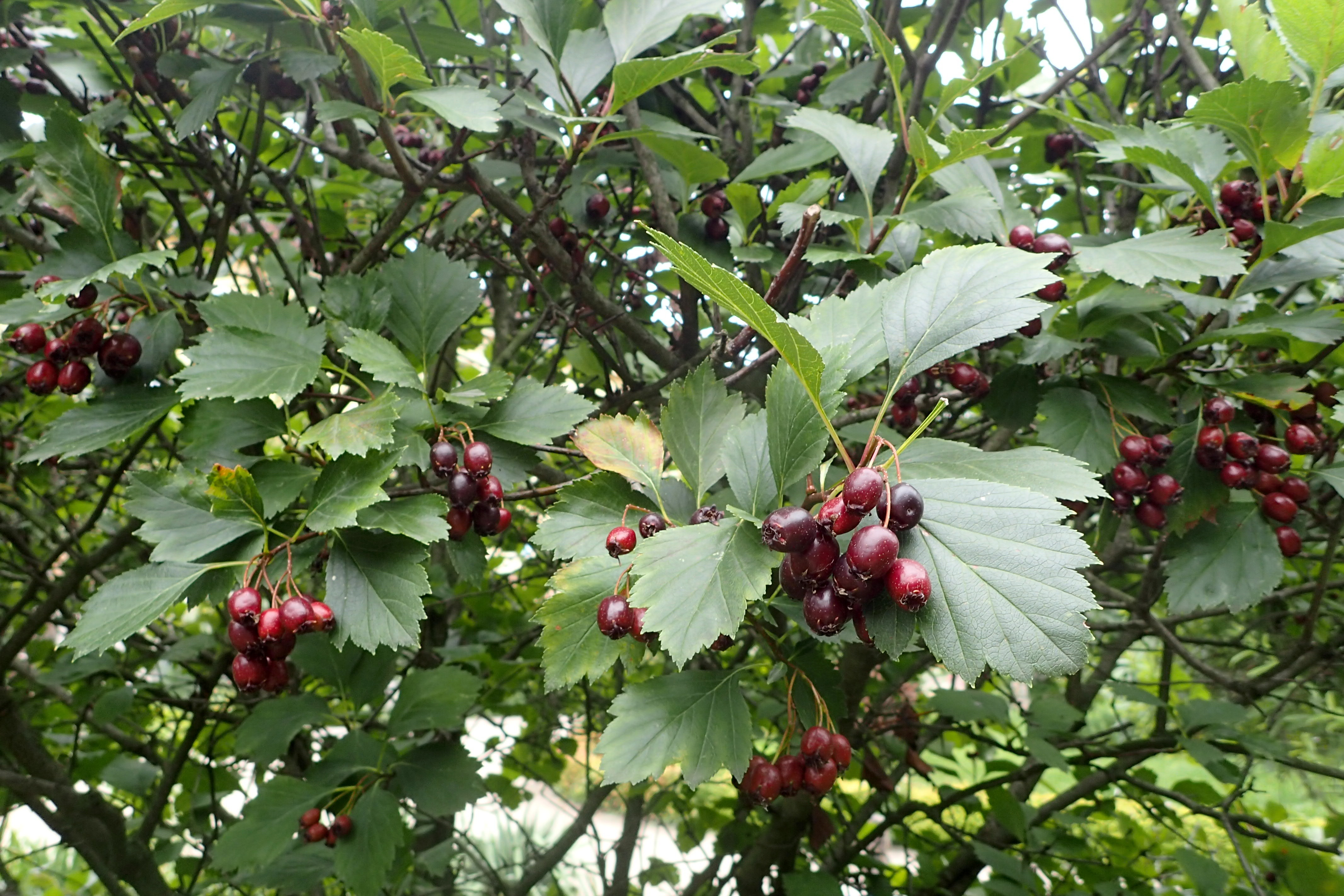
Crataegus douglasii

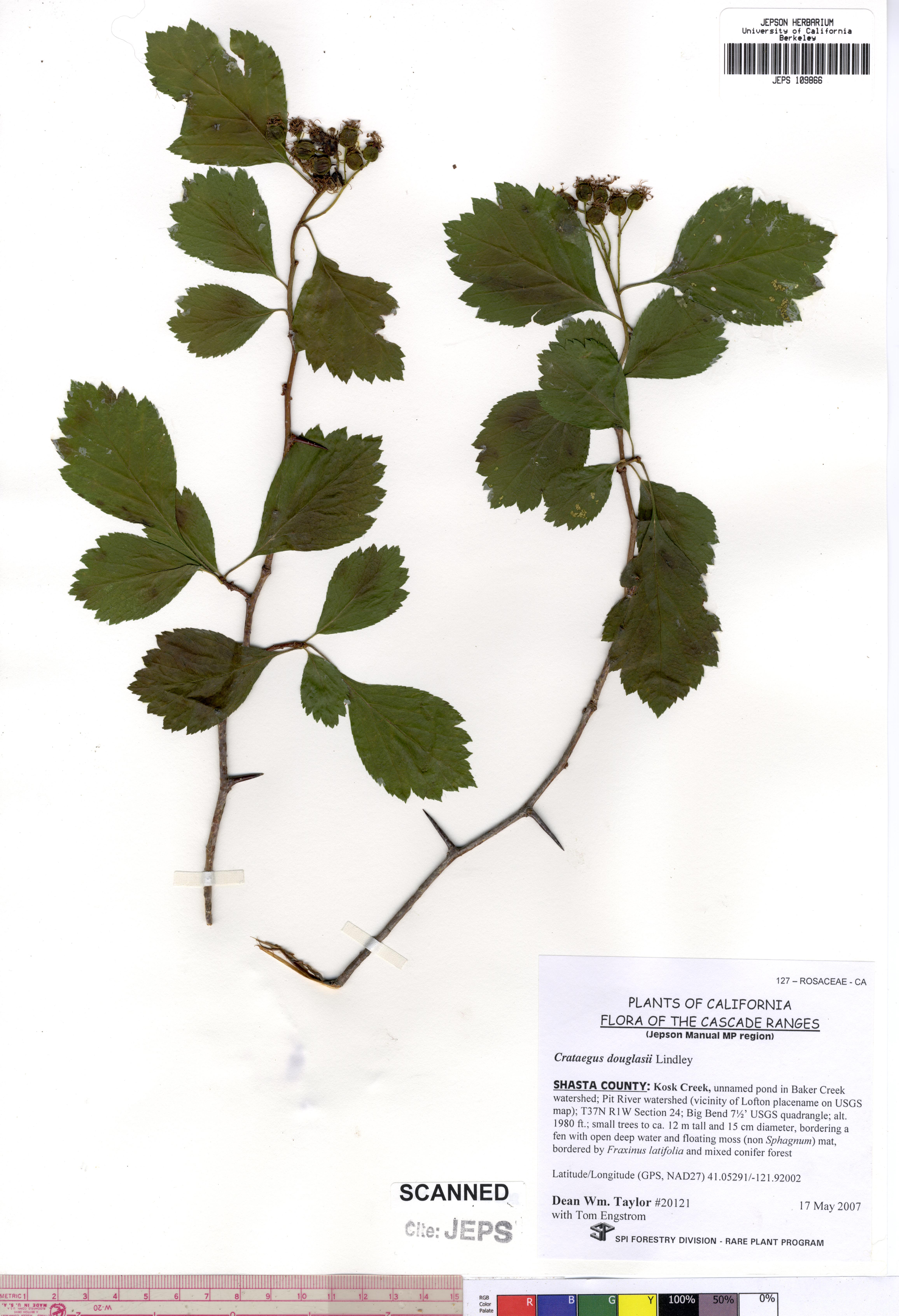
Crataegus douglasii JEPS109866 (4496863581)

== See also ==
- List of hawthorn species with black fruit
