= Glacier Peak (Oregon) =

Mountain peak in Oregon, United States

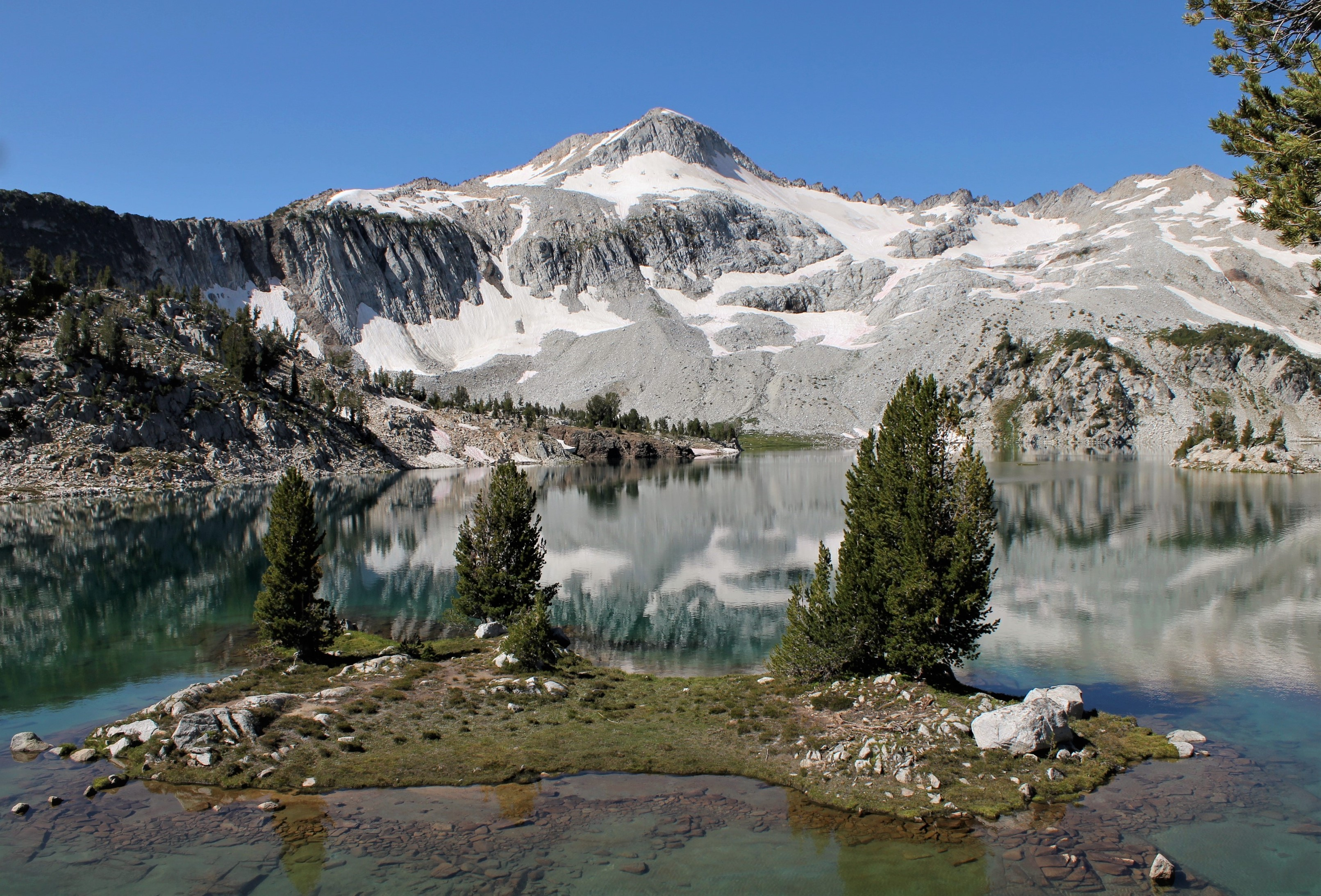
- Northeast aspect, from Glacier Lake

Highest point
- Elevation: 9,495 ft (2,894 m)
- Prominence: 295 ft (90 m)
- Parent peak: Eagle Cap (9,577 ft)
- Isolation: 0.7 mi (1.1 km)
- Coordinates: 45°09′18″N 117°17′36″W

Geography
- Location within Oregon Location within the United States
- Country: United States of America
- State: Oregon
- County: Union
- Protected area: Eagle Cap Wilderness
- Parent range: Wallowa Mountains
- Topo map: USGS Eagle Cap

Geology
- Rock type: granitic

Glacier Peak is a 9,495-foot elevation (2,894 m) mountain summit located in Union County, Oregon, US.

== Description ==
Glacier Peak is located at the center of the Wallowa Mountains and is set within the Eagle Cap Wilderness, on land managed by Wallowa–Whitman National Forest. The peak is situated 2.6 miles northwest of Cusick Mountain, 0.5 mile southwest of Glacier Lake and 0.7 mile southeast of line parent Eagle Cap. Precipitation runoff from the mountain drains east into headwaters of the West Fork Wallowa River, and west into the East Fork Eagle Creek. Topographic relief is significant as the summit rises 3,100 feet (940 meters) above Eagle Creek in less than one mile. On the north slope, a permanent snowfield called Benson Glacier is a relict of the Wallowa Glacier which carved the canyon of West Fork Wallowa River for almost 20 miles during the late Pleistocene. The peak is composed of granodiorite of the Wallowa Batholith. This landform's toponym has not been officially adopted by the United States Board on Geographic Names, so it is not labelled on USGS maps, and will remain unofficial as long as the USGS policy of not adopting new toponyms in designated wilderness areas remains in effect.

== Climate ==
Based on the Köppen climate classification, Glacier Peak is located in a subarctic climate zone characterized by long, usually very cold winters, and mild summers. Winter temperatures can drop below −10 °F with wind chill factors below −20 °F. Most precipitation in the area is caused by orographic lift. Thunderstorms are common in the summer.

== See also ==
- List of mountain peaks of Oregon

== Gallery ==
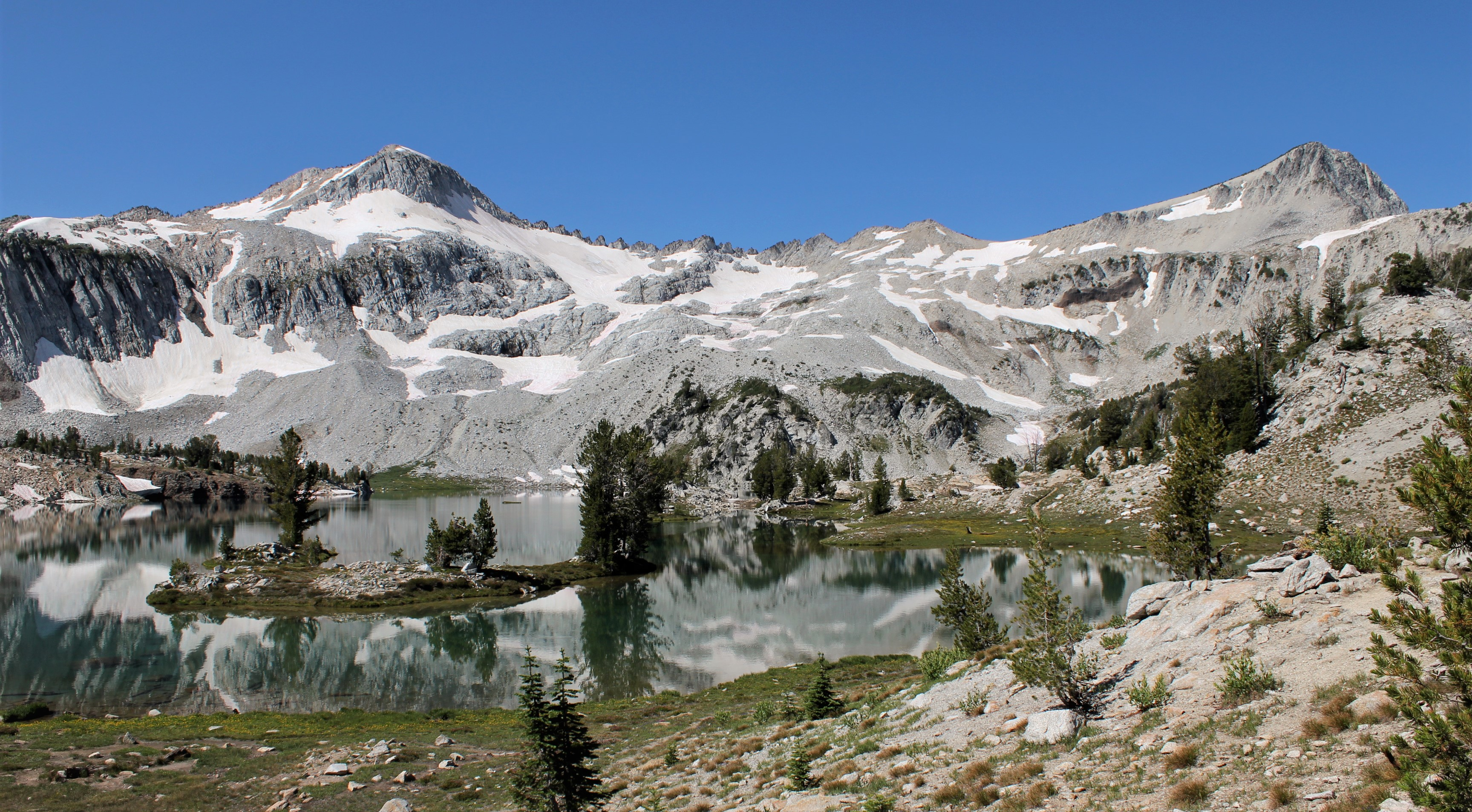
Glacier Peak (left) with parent Eagle Cap (right) from Glacier Lake

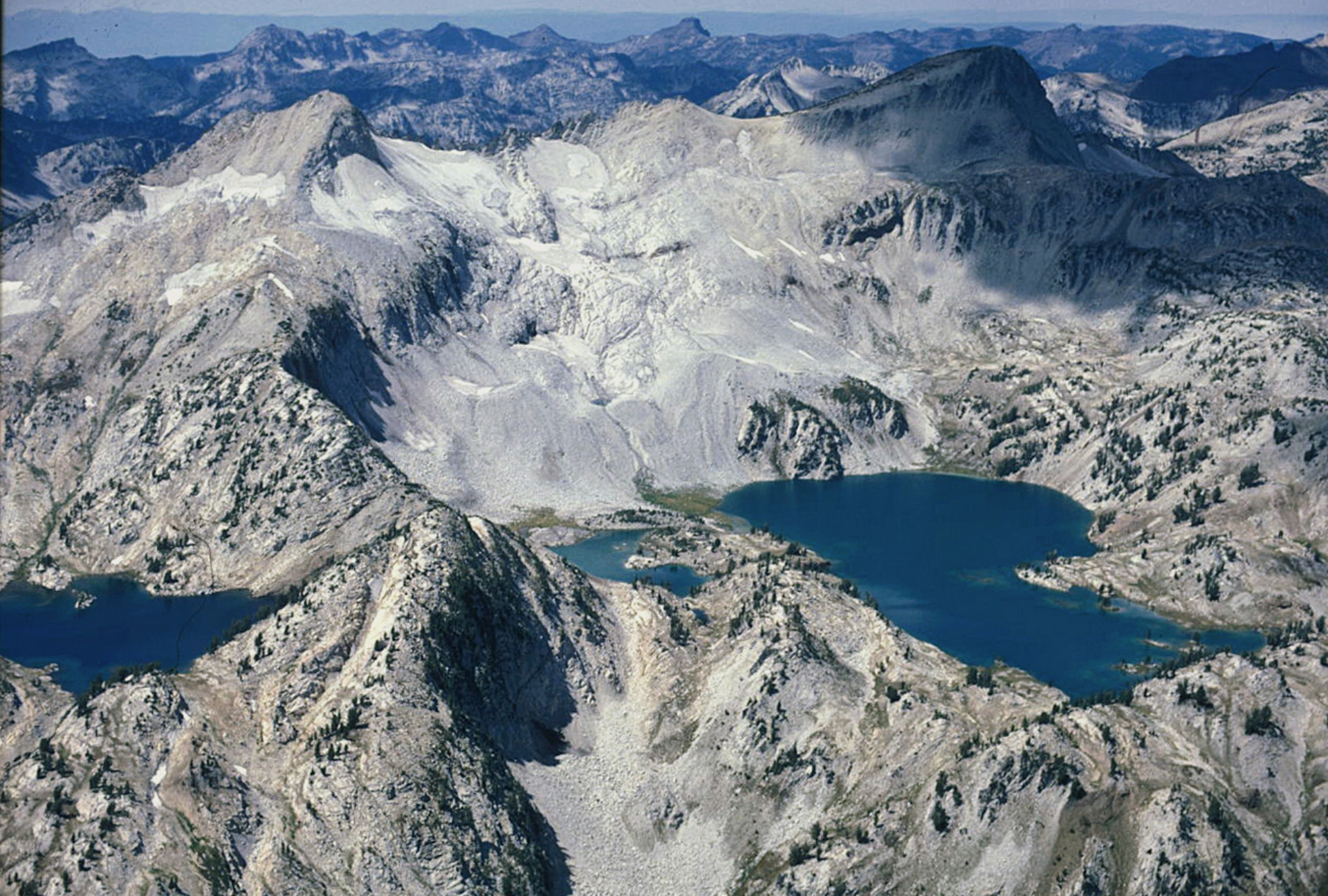
Aerial view of Glacier Peak in upper left, Eagle Cap upper right,
Prospect Lake lower left, Glacier Lake to right.

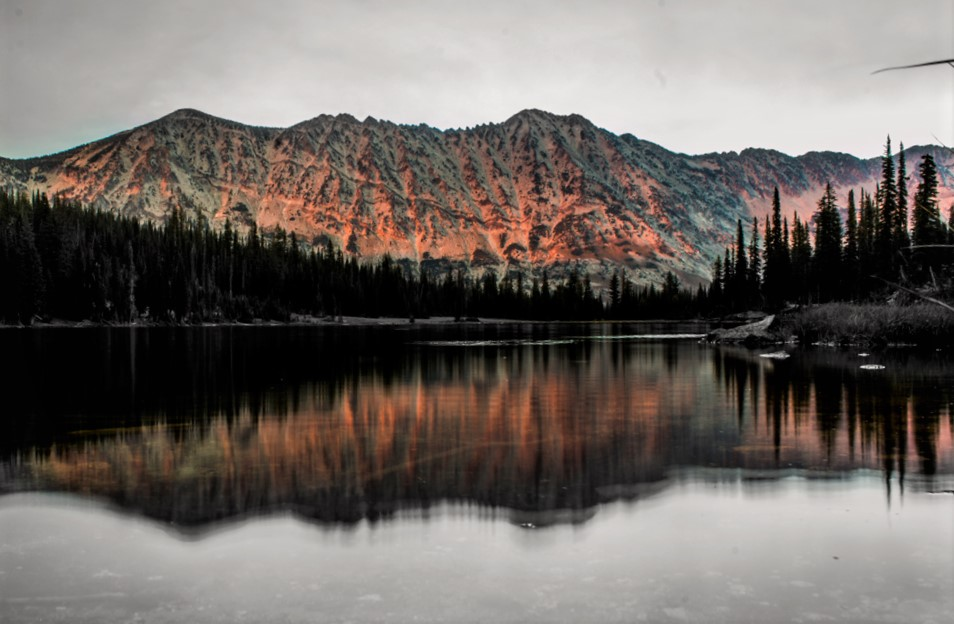
Southwest aspect of Glacier Peak reflected in Hidden Lake

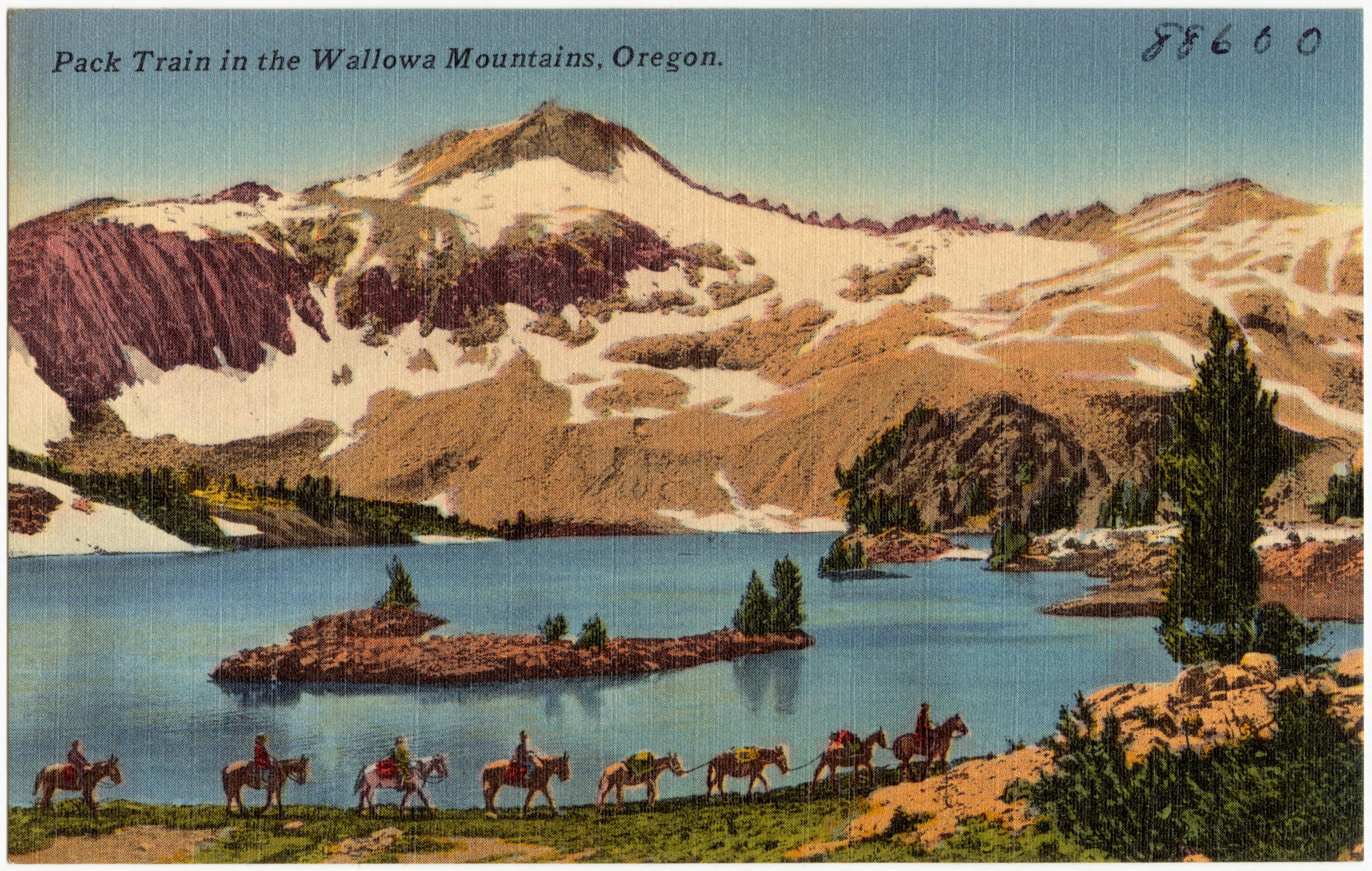
Postcard of Glacier Peak circa 1930—1945

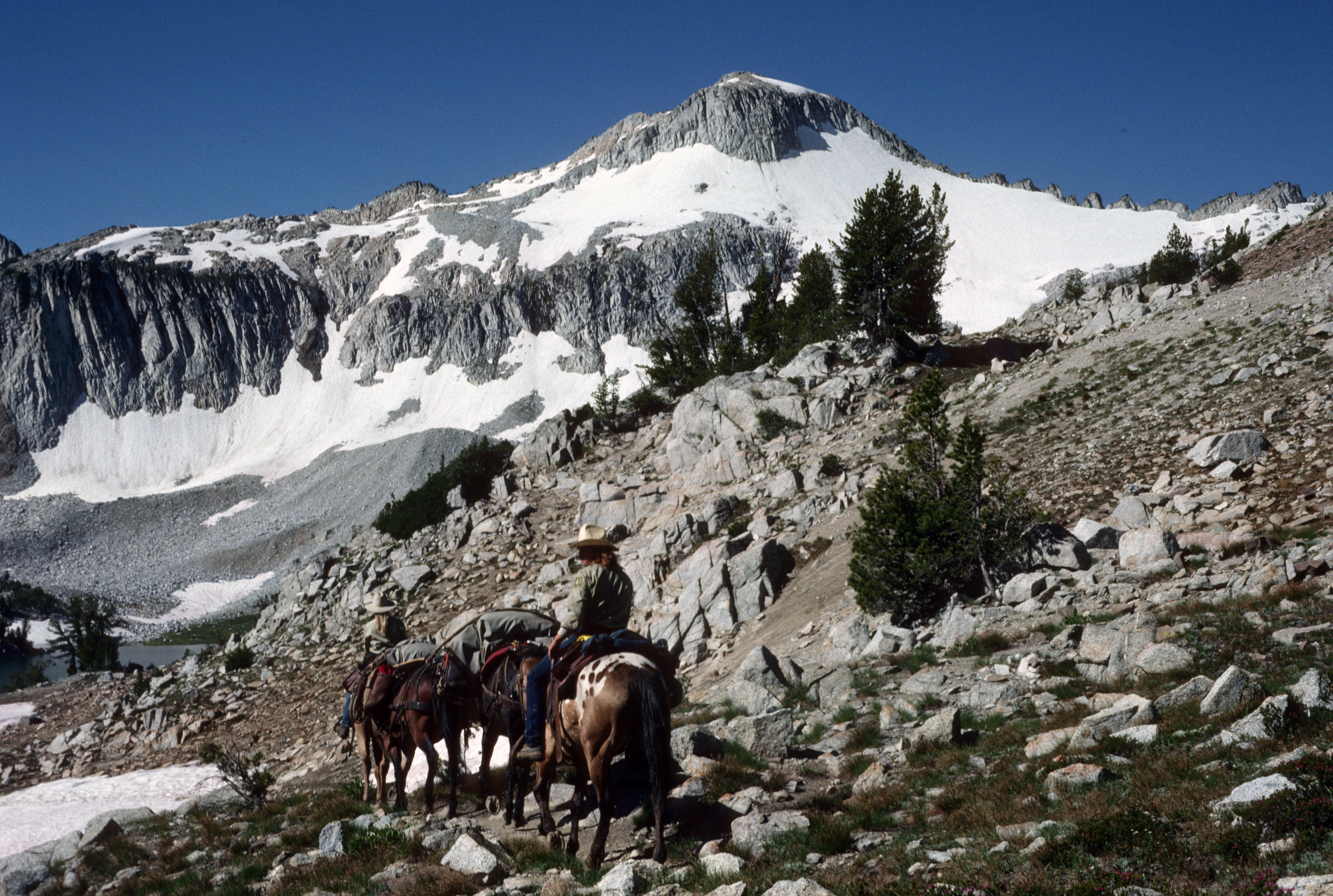
