= Pittsfield, Vermont =

- Town
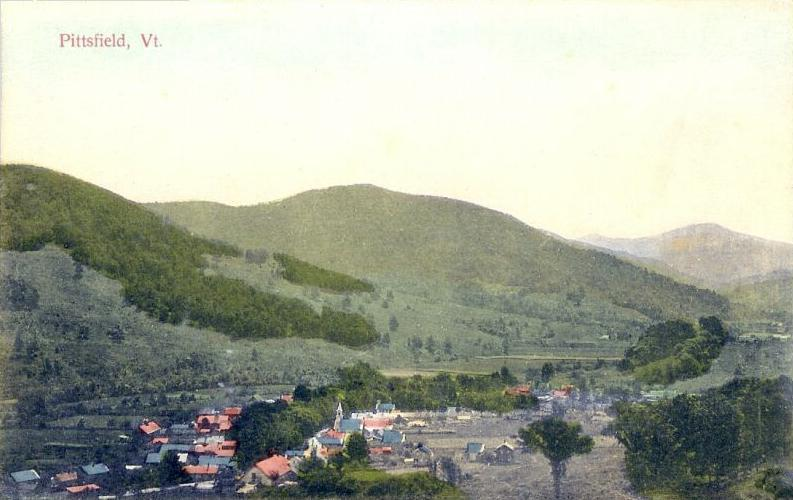
- Bird's-eye view of Pittsfield c. 1910

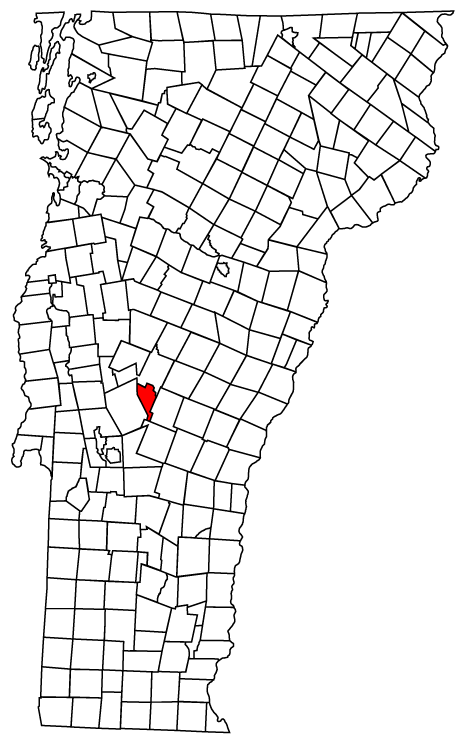
- Pittsfield, Vermont
- Coordinates: 43°46′10″N 72°49′27″W
- Country: United States
- State: Vermont
- County: Rutland
- Chartered: 1781

Area
  - Total: 20.0 sq mi (51.9 km^{2})
  - Land: 20.0 sq mi (51.9 km^{2})
  - Water: 0 sq mi (0.0 km^{2})
- Elevation: 2,169 ft (661 m)

Population (2020)
  - Total: 504
  - Density: 25.2/sq mi (9.71/km^{2})
- Time zone: UTC-5 (Eastern (EST))
  - Summer (DST): UTC-4 (EDT)
- ZIP code: 05762
- Area code: 802
- FIPS code: 50-55450
- GNIS feature ID: 1462173
- Website: www.pittsfieldvt.com

Pittsfield is a town in Rutland County, Vermont, United States. The population was 504 at the 2020 census.

== History ==
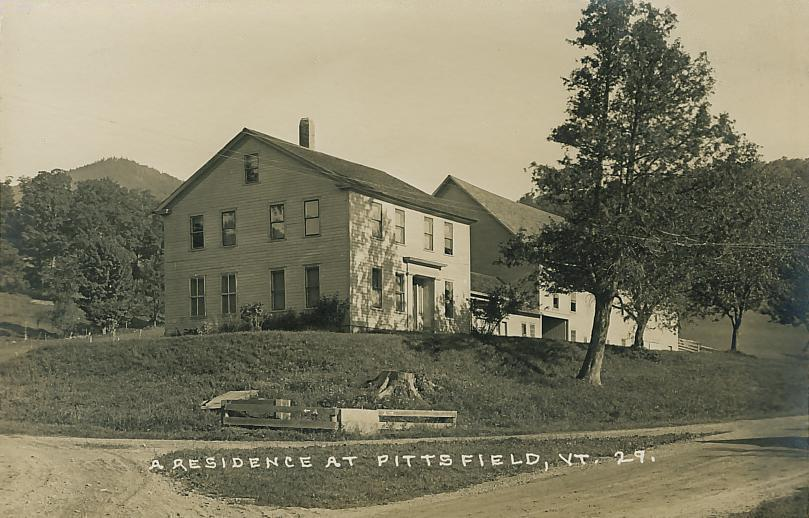
A Pittsfield farmhouse c. 1915

Granted on November 8, 1780, the town was chartered on July 29, 1781, to Samuel Wilcox and 129 others. Pittsfield was named after Pittsfield, Massachusetts, which itself had been named in honor of William Pitt. It was first settled in 1786. The town proved suitable for grazing livestock because of its mountainous terrain. Indeed, in the 19th century, humorists attributed the invention of the one-legged milking stool to Pittsfield, "...as a means of conquering a stern difficulty."

The Farmhouse pictured in this 1915 Postcard to the left still stands and was converted in 1960 to The Fleur De Lis Lodge, for travelers and skiers to stay. Six rooms remain in the original farmhouse, while seven more rooms were added to the new section above the great room.

Pittfield was one of thirteen Vermont towns isolated by flooding caused by Tropical Storm Irene in 2011.

== Geography ==
According to the United States Census Bureau, the town has a total area of 20.0 square miles (52 km^{2}), all land. Set among the Green Mountains, Pittsfield is drained by the Tweed River, a tributary of the White River.

The town is crossed by Vermont Route 100.

== Demographics ==
Historical population
Census	Pop.	Note	%±
1790	49		—
1800	164		234.7%
1810	338		106.1%
1820	453		34.0%
1830	505		11.5%
1840	615		21.8%
1850	512		−16.7%
1860	493		−3.7%
1870	482		−2.2%
1880	555		15.1%
1890	468		−15.7%
1900	435		−7.1%
1910	402		−7.6%
1920	343		−14.7%
1930	256		−25.4%
1940	259		1.2%
1950	225		−13.1%
1960	254		12.9%
1970	249		−2.0%
1980	396		59.0%
1990	389		−1.8%
2000	427		9.8%
2010	546		27.9%
2020	504		−7.7%
U.S. Decennial Census

As of the census of 2000, there were 427 people, 190 households, and 120 families residing in the town. The population density was 21.3 people per square mile (8.2/km^{2}). There were 393 housing units at an average density of 19.6 per square mile (7.6/km^{2}). The racial makeup of the town was 98.36% White, 0.23% Asian, and 1.41% from two or more races. Hispanic or Latino of any race were 0.47% of the population.

There were 190 households, out of which 24.7% had children under the age of 18 living with them, 55.3% were married couples living together, 4.7% had a female householder with no husband present, and 36.8% were non-families. 25.3% of all households were made up of individuals, and 5.3% had someone living alone who was 65 years of age or older. The average household size was 2.25 and the average family size was 2.73.

In the town, the population was spread out, with 19.9% under the age of 18, 3.5% from 18 to 24, 30.4% from 25 to 44, 30.7% from 45 to 64, and 15.5% who were 65 years of age or older. The median age was 41 years. For every 100 females, there were 104.3 males. For every 100 females age 18 and over, there were 109.8 males.

The median income for a household in the town was $41,667, and the median income for a family was $47,000. Males had a median income of $29,306 versus $26,406 for females. The per capita income for the town was $21,837. About 1.6% of families and 4.2% of the population were below the poverty line, including none of those under age 18 and 6.0% of those age 65 or over.

== Notable events ==
In August 2011, Pittsfield became known as one of the most isolated Vermont towns when Tropical Storm Irene destroyed parts of Vermont Route 100 between Killington and Bethel, preventing vehicle travel in and out of the town for weeks. The Giorgetti Covered Bridge was completely destroyed by flood waters, along with 8 homes. As with so many other towns in the area, the geography of this small village has changed significantly.

== Notable people ==
- Belle C. Greene, writer
- Charles Herbert Joyce, US congressman
- Chelsea Marshall, Former US Ski Team Member, grew up in Pittsfield
- Joe De Sena, resides in Pittsfield
