= Belle C. Greene =

American novelist (1842–1926)

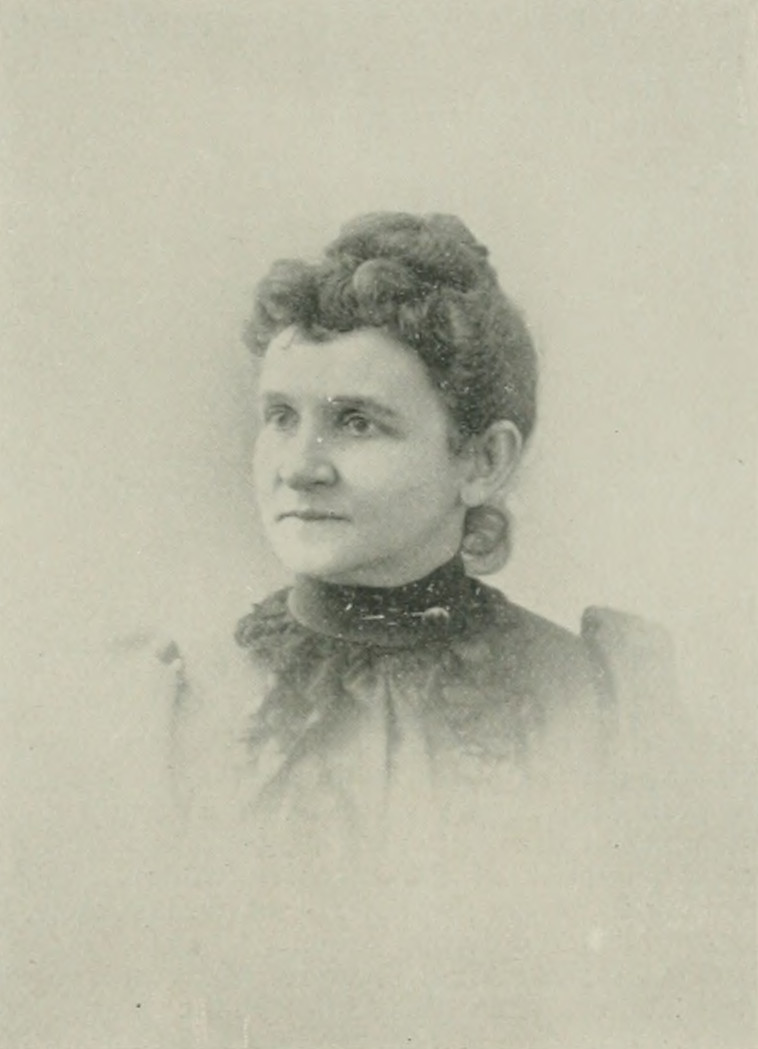
- Greene in A Woman of the Century (1983)
- Born: Isabel Colton Greene; March 17, 1842 Pittsfield, Vermont, U.S.
- Died: March 10, 1926 (aged 83) Palatine, Illinois, U.S.
- Resting place: Hillside Cemetery
- Occupation: Author
- Spouse: Martin Van Buren Greene (m. 1868)
- Children: 1

Isabel Colton Greene, known as Belle C. Green (March 17, 1842 – March 10, 1926), was an American author of humorous novels.

== Early life ==
Isabel (nickname, "Belle") Colton was born in Pittsfield, Vermont, on March 17, 1842. Her ancestors were a mix of American, English and Native American. One of her ancestors on her father's side married a Native American princess belonging to a Massachusetts tribe, and settled in that state. Her mother, Lucy Baker, came from Puritan stock; she died at the age of 47, leaving her husband and a family of six girls. Isabel, who was next to the youngest, was four years old at the time. She was taken into the family of a distant relative living in Nashua, New Hampshire, where she was reared and educated in strictest orthodox ways.

== Career ==
It was not till the year 1881 that Belle Greene began her literary work in earnest. She sent a short story and a humorous sketch to her friend, Elizabeth Stuart Phelps, asking for advice and encouragement. Phelps replied with characteristic honesty and kindness that Greene's voice was doubtless her one great gift, and, as mortals were seldom blessed with two, she advised her to stick to music, but added, since she must give an opinion, that she considered the humorous sketch better than the story. Upon this scanty encouragement Greene offered the humorous sketch to Godey's Lady's Book, and it was accepted. She continued to furnish sketches for a year or more, and concluded her work for the magazine by writing her first story proper, a novelette, afterward published in book form under the title A New England Idyl (1886).

She wrote also for The Youth's Companion and Harpers Weekly.

Adventures of an Old Maid (1886), a second book, was a collection of humorous sketches published first in the magazines, and sold over 75,000 copies. Her religious novel, A New England Conscience (1885), attracted wide comment. Though severely denounced by some of the critics, it was regarded by others as a masterpiece of condensed thought and realistic character drawing.

Other works include: Mr. and Mrs. Hannibal Hawkins (1897), The hobbledehoy; the story of one betwixt boy and man (1895), Hobbly Dr. Hoe (the story of a man who attempted to understand the mind of a boy).

In 1887–88, Greene made an extended tour of southern California and the Pacific Coast, and during her stay of several months in Los Angeles and San Diego she contributed to the newspapers a series of humorous sketches founded upon the phases of the boom, which added greatly to her reputation as a humorous writer. These last-mentioned articles constitute her only newspaper work, with the exception of the Mill Papers, regarding the operatives in the cotton-mills, written for the Boston Transcript in 1883 and 1884.

== Personal life ==
In 1868, Colton married Martin Van Buren Greene, of Nashua, New Hampshire. They had one son, Edward Martin Greene, who became Professor of Romance Languages at the University of South Dakota. Edward was his mother's constant companion on several trips across the continent to California, as well to Europe.

She used to spend summers with her sister in Palatine, Illinois, since 1910. She died there on March 10, 1926, and is buried at Hillside Cemetery.

Her grandson, John Colton Greene, a former president of the History of Science Society and winner of its 2002 George Sarton Medal for outstanding scholarly achievement, was a professor of history at the University of Connecticut.
