= Emil P. Kruschke =

American curator and botanist (1907–1976)

Emil P. Kruschke (1907–1976) was a curator and botanist who collected plants. He curated the Milwaukee Public Museum. He authored The Hawthorns of Wisconsin: Status, objectives, and methods of collecting and preparing specimens published in 1955 and Contributions to the Taxonomy of Crataegus published in 1965.

He specialized in the study and taxonomy of plants in Wisconsin, borage and hawthorn families in particular. He collected Crataegus specimens. He was an organizer of the Citizens Natural Resources Association of Wisconsin (CNRA).

He was assistant curator at the Milwaukee Public Museum from 1938–1964 and curator from 1964 until he retired in 1974. He worked with fellow botanist Albert M. Fuller (1899–1981), an orchid specialist.

== Writings ==
- "Preliminary Reports on the Flora of Wisconsin, Boraginaceae. XXXII" (1944)
- "Floral Four-flushers" (1955)
- The Hawthorns of Wisconsin: Status, objectives, and methods of collecting and preparing specimens (1955)
- Contributions to the Taxonomy of Crataegus (1965)
