= Eagle Cap =

Mountain peak in the U.S. state of Oregon

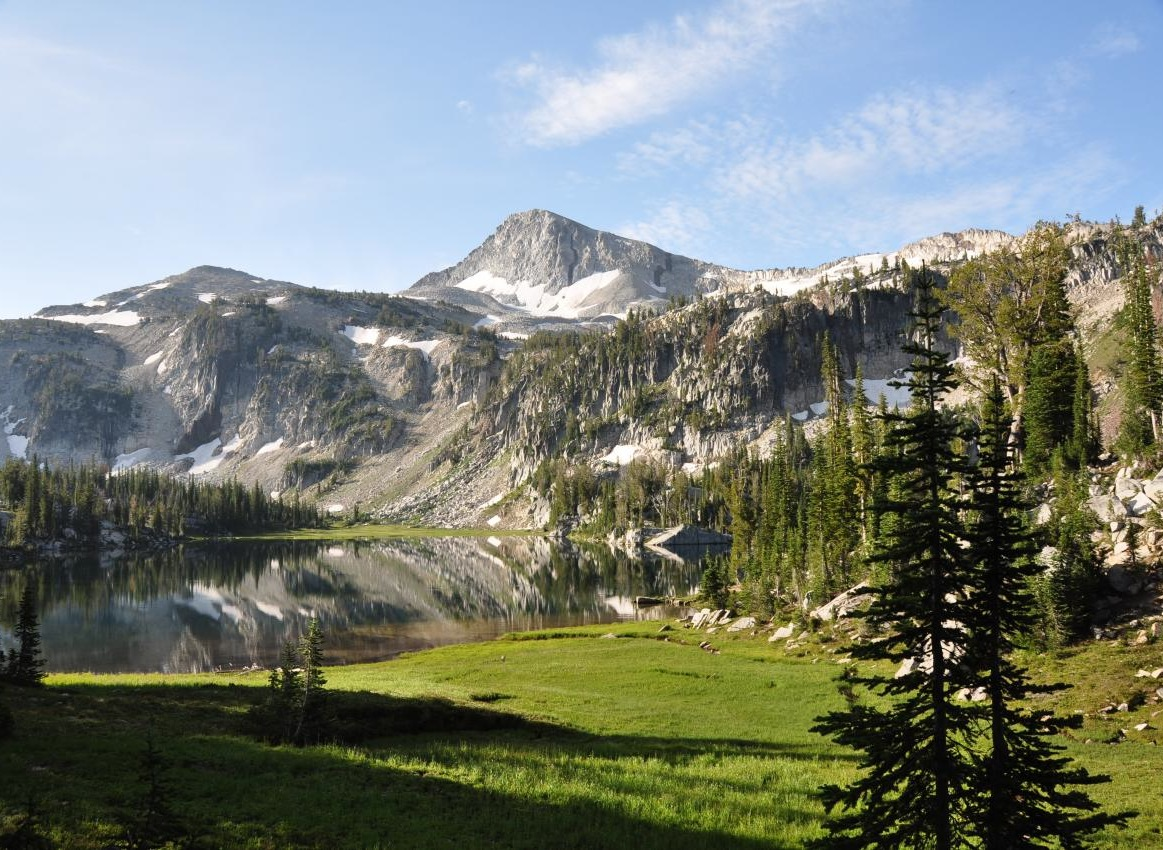
- Eagle Cap above Mirror Lake

Highest point
- Elevation: 9,577 ft (2,919 m) NAVD 88
- Prominence: 1,212 ft (369 m)
- Listing: Oregon county high points
- Coordinates: 45°09′49″N 117°18′06″W

Geography
- Location within Oregon Location within the United States
- Location: Wallowa-Whitman National Forest, Union County, Oregon, U.S.
- Parent range: Wallowa Mountains
- Topo map: USGS Eagle Cap

Climbing
- Easiest route: Scramble

Eagle Cap (9,577 feet (2,919 m)) is a mountain peak located in the Wallowa Mountains, Wallowa–Whitman National Forest, in the U.S. state of Oregon. The peak is in the Eagle Cap Wilderness, towering over Mirror Lake, with the Benson Glacier along the east flank of the summit ridge. Its summit is the highest point in Union County.

== Gallery ==
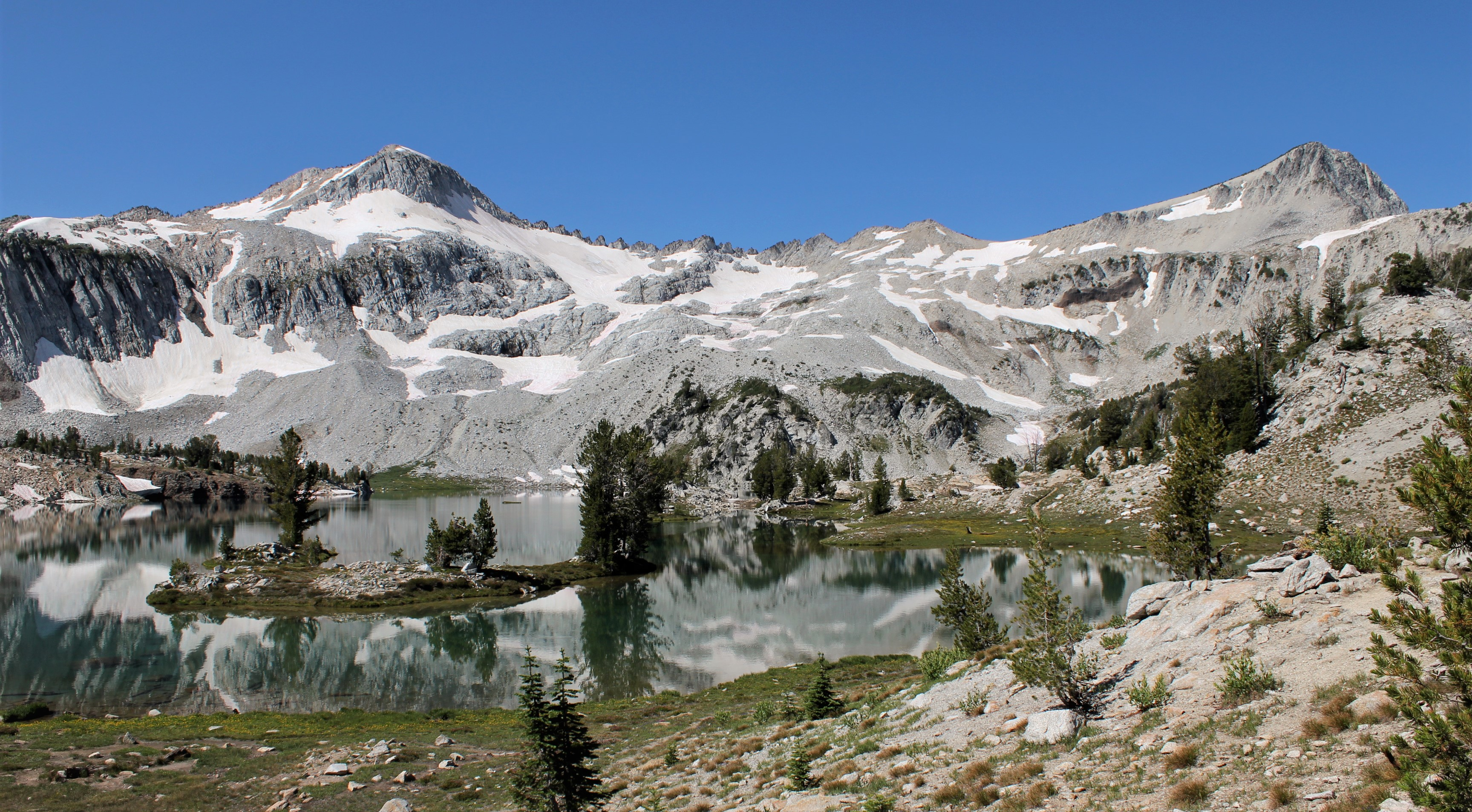
Glacier Peak (left) with Eagle Cap (right) from Glacier Lake

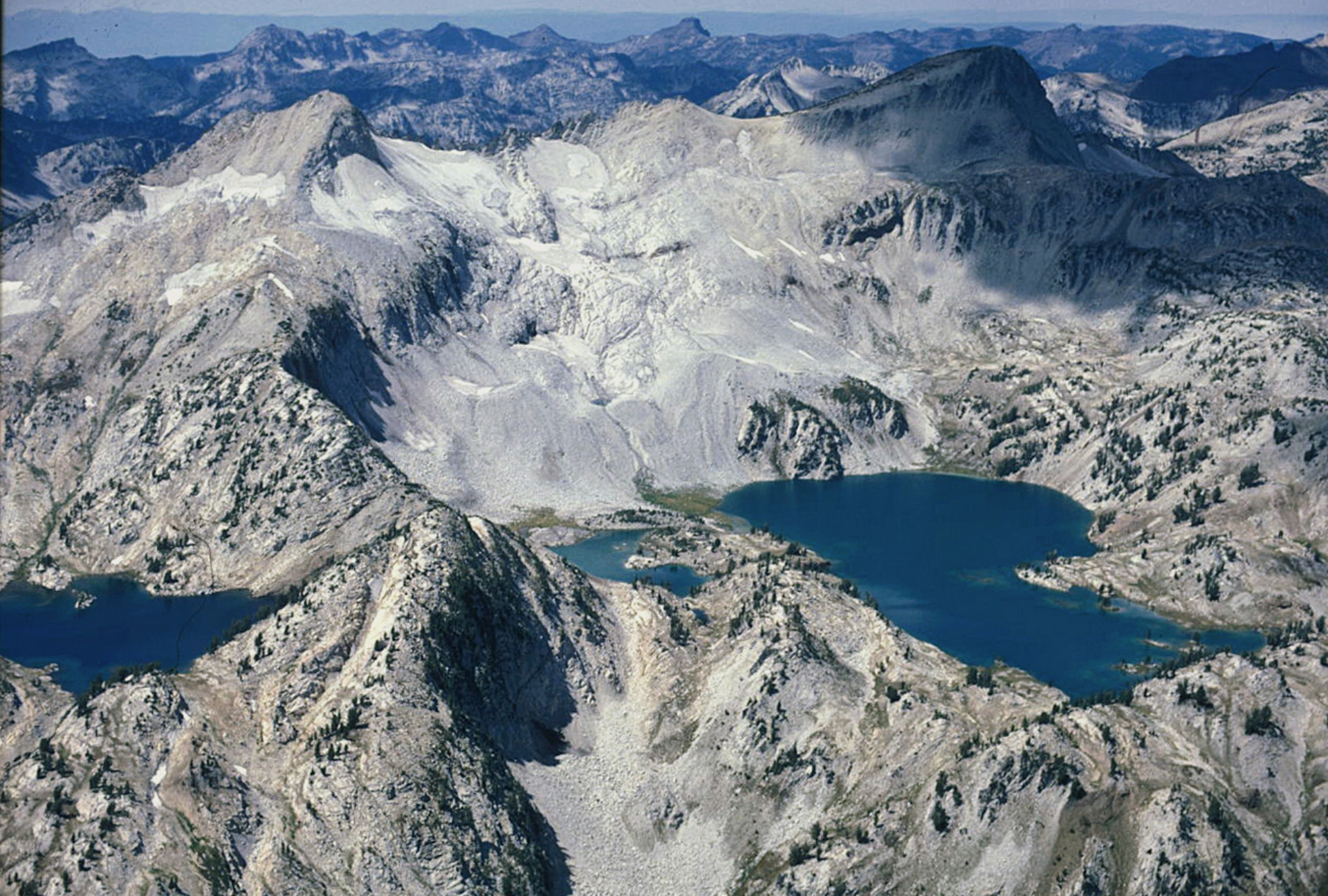
Aerial view of Glacier Peak in upper left, Eagle Cap shaded in upper right,
Prospect Lake lower left, Glacier Lake to right.
