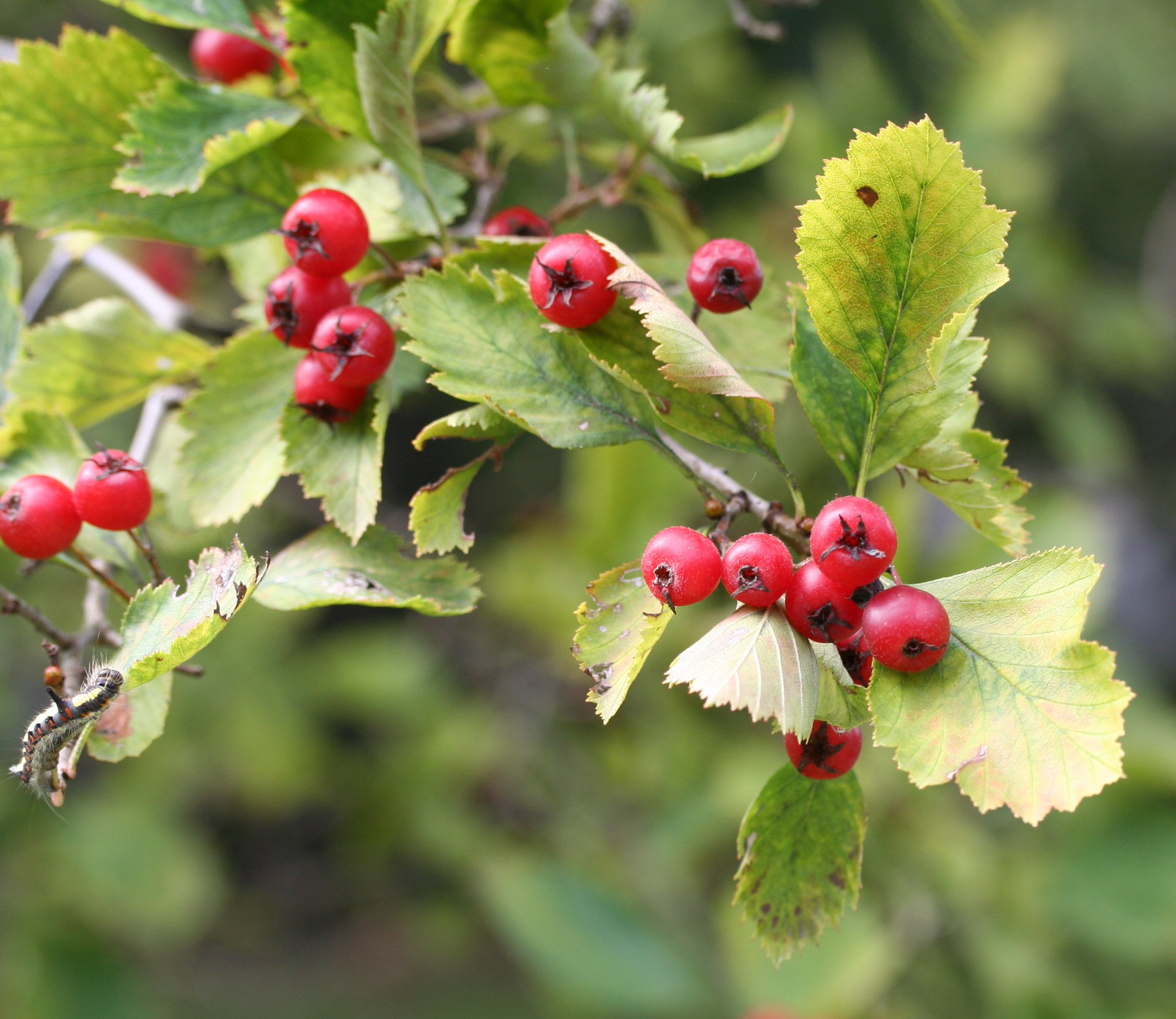

Conservation status
- Least Concern (IUCN 3.1)

Scientific classification
- Kingdom: Plantae
- Clade: Tracheophytes
- Clade: Angiosperms
- Clade: Eudicots
- Clade: Rosids
- Order: Rosales
- Family: Rosaceae
- Genus: Crataegus
- Section: Crataegus sect. Coccineae
- Series: Crataegus ser. Rotundifoliae
- Species: C. chrysocarpa

Binomial name
- Crataegus chrysocarpa Ashe

= Crataegus chrysocarpa =

Species of hawthorn

Crataegus chrysocarpa is a species of hawthorn that is native to much of the continental United States and Canada. Common names fireberry hawthorn and goldenberry hawthorn, as well as the scientific name all refer to the colour of the unripe fruit, although the mature fruit is red and in var. vernonensis is "deep claret-colored … nearly black when over-ripe".

Three varieties C. chrysocarpa var. chrysocarpa, var. piperi, and var. vernonensis are recognized.

== Images ==
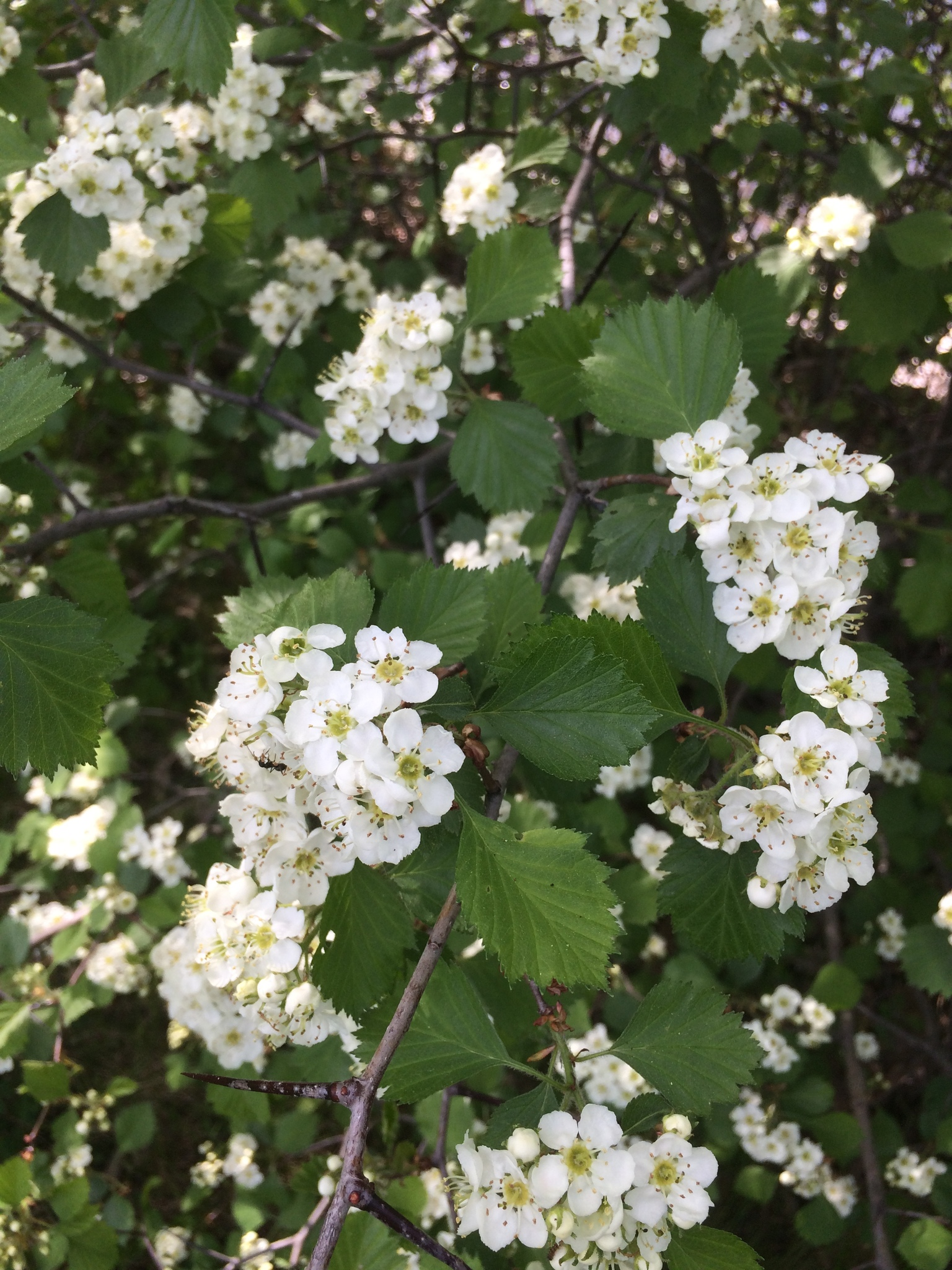
Crataegus chrysocarpa var. chrysocarpa, wild vouchered tree from Montreal, Canada.

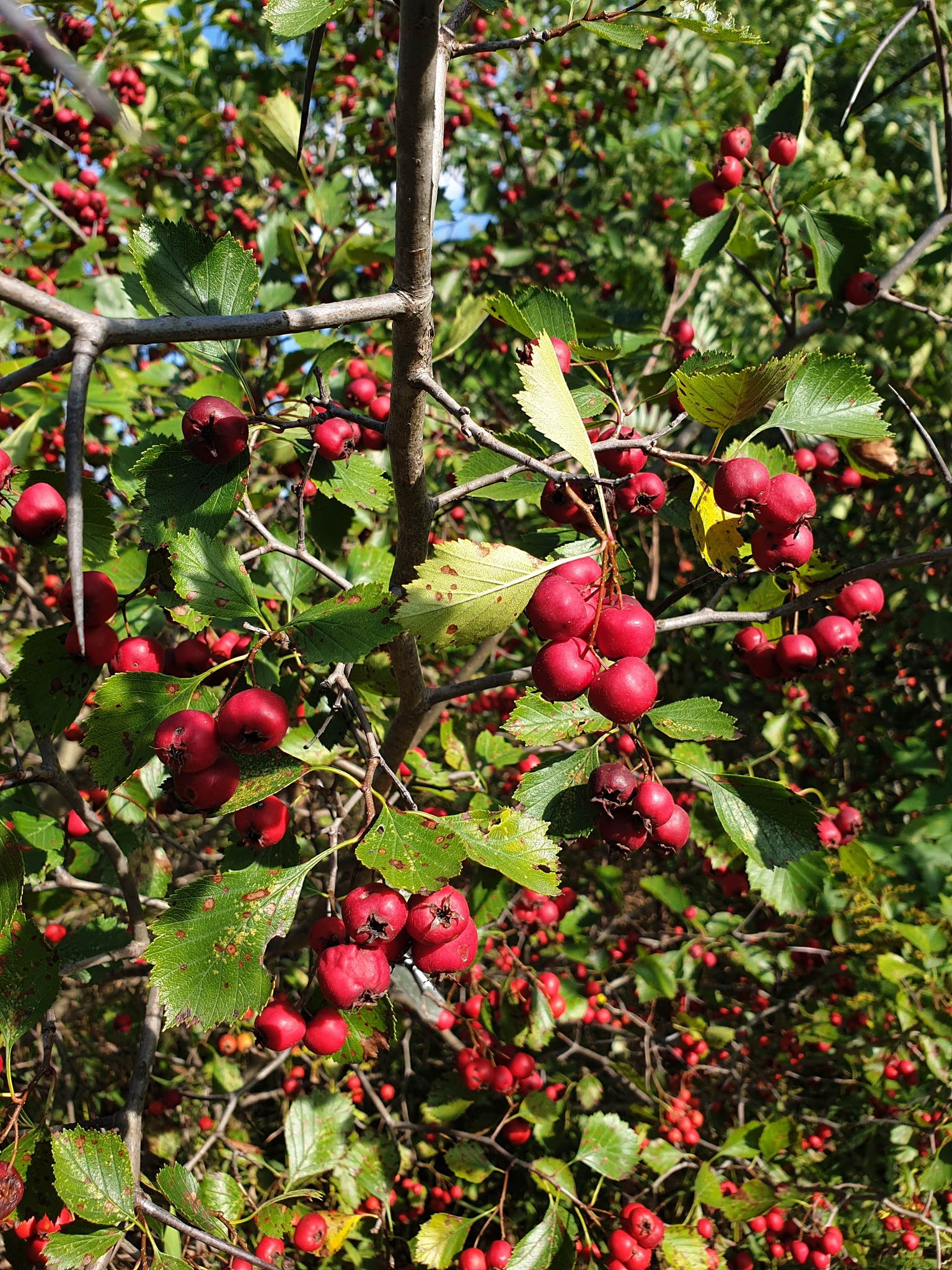
Fruiting Crataegus chrysocarpa var. chrysocarpa collected in Laval, Canada.

== See also ==
- List of hawthorn species with yellow fruit
- List of hawthorn species with black fruit
