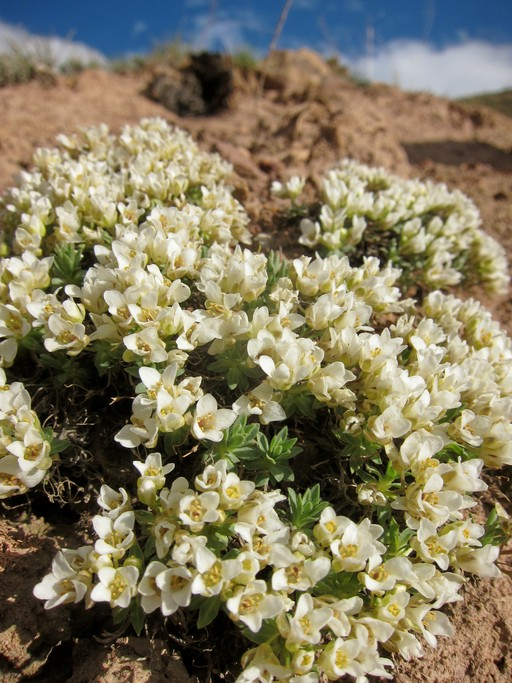
- Cusickiella douglasii

Scientific classification
- Kingdom: Plantae
- Clade: Tracheophytes
- Clade: Angiosperms
- Clade: Eudicots
- Clade: Rosids
- Order: Brassicales
- Family: Brassicaceae
- Genus: Cusickiella; Rollins

Species
- 2 - see text

= Cusickiella =

Genus of flowering plants

Cusickiella is a small genus containing two species of plants in the family Brassicaceae which are native to the western United States. These are mat-forming perennials with a stumpy, branching caudex covered in rounded clusters of tiny, thick leaves. A short stem bears white or yellowish flowers that yield silicles.

The alkali cusickiella, Cusickiella douglasii, grows in the hills and mountains from California to Washington, Idaho, and Utah. It has white flowers and usually larger leaves, up to 14 millimeters long.

The Bodie Hills cusickiella, Cusickiella quadricostata, has a more limited distribution in eastern California and western Nevada. It can be distinguished from its congener by its yellow flowers, leaves no more than 5 millimeters long, and a keel along the valves on the silicle.
