= Thomas J. Howell (botanist) =

American botanist (1842-1912)

Thomas Jefferson Howell
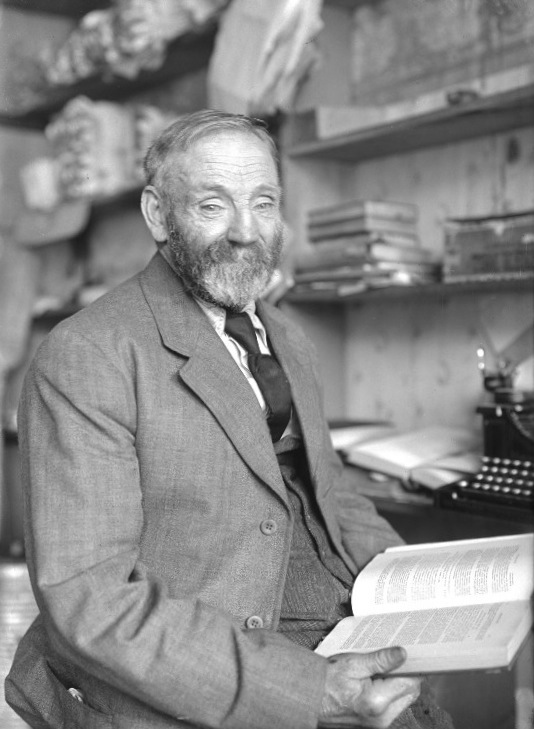
- Thomas J. Howell in 1910
- Born: October 8, 1842; Cooper County, Missouri
- Died: December 3, 1912 (aged 70); Portland, Oregon, United States
- Occupation: Botanist
- Scientific career
- Author abbrev. (botany): Howell

Thomas Jefferson Howell (October 8, 1842 – December 3, 1912) was an American botanist. Howell is considered one of the top three self-taught botanists of his era for the Pacific Northwest, the other two being Wilhelm Nikolaus Suksdorf and William Conklin Cusick.

== Personal life ==
Howell was born in Cooper County, Missouri, on October 8, 1842. He came west with his parents, Benjamin and Elizabeth (Mathews) Howell, and his four siblings in 1850. The Howells took up a Donation Land Claim on Sauvie Island in 1854. Howell was largely self-taught, and only had six months of formal schooling. His father was a doctor who had taught him some Latin and science, but he mostly educated himself while farming along the Clackamas River after leaving Sauvie Island. He owned several grocery stores in the Portland area over years. He served as the first post master of the Willamette Slough post office on Sauvie Island starting in 1873. He later served as the first postmaster of Creighton post office in Oak Grove, Oregon, beginning in 1904. Howell married Effie McIlwane in 1892. The Howells had two sons, Dorsey R. Howell (born in 1894) and Benjamin A. Howell (born in 1904). Howell died on December 3, 1912, in Woodstock, Oregon (now a neighborhood in southeast Portland).

== Career ==
Soon after arriving in Oregon, Howell and his brother Joseph developed an interest in botany. An aquatic plant sent to Harvard botanist Asa Gray in 1878 was named Howellia aquatilis by him in the brothers' honor. In 1877, Howell started an herbarium, in which he cataloged 2,152 species. Today his collections are in many American and European herbaria, with a large set at Oregon State University. He issued the exsiccata Howell's Pacific Coast plants. Howell published his first catalog of regional plants in 1881. He compiled and published A Flora of Northwest America between 1897 and 1903. Lacking funds, he borrowed type and hand-set the book a few pages at a time, taking them to Portland to be printed. It was the most comprehensive list of Oregon and Washington plants published up to that time.

== Legacy ==
Over 30 species of plants bear the name howellii in honor of Howell. He donated his collection of approximately 10,000 plant specimens to the University of Oregon, which was subsequently transferred to Oregon State University in 1993. He spent the 1903–1904 academic year cataloging the collection for the University of Oregon.

Thomas Howell is one of the 158 names of people who are notable in the early history of Oregon painted in the friezes of the House and Senate chambers of the Oregon State Capitol. Howell's name appears in the House side.

His family's home, the Bybee–Howell House, is on the National Register of Historic Places. It was purchased by Howell's brothers Joseph and John in 1873 from James and Julia Bybee and was adjacent to their parents' home.
