= Willard Webster Eggleston =

American botanist (1863–1935)

- Born: March 28, 1863; Pittsfield, Vermont, U.S.
- Died: November 25, 1935 (aged 72); Washington, D.C., U.S
- Education: Dartmouth College
- Scientific career
- Workplaces: United States Department of Agriculture Bureau of Plant Industry

Willard Webster Eggleston (March 28, 1863 in Pittsfield, Vermont – November 25, 1935 in Washington, D.C.) was an American botanist, employed by the United States Department of Agriculture Bureau of Plant Industry. He graduated from Dartmouth College in 1891 with a Bachelor of Science degree. In his work on the taxonomy of Crataegus (hawthorns), now known to be complicated by apomixis, polyploidy, and hybridization, he aimed to simplify, counteracting the proliferation of species names that other botanists had produced.

== Works ==
- Brainerd, E.; Jones, L.R.; Eggleston, W.W. (1900), "Crataegus. Hawthorn", Flora of Vermont: A list of ferns and seed plants growing without cultivation, Burlington: Vermont Botanical Club
- Eggleston, W.W. (1904), "The Crataegi of Fort Frederick, Crown Point, New York", Torreya, 4: 38–39
- Eggleston, W.W. (1906), "Crataegus of Duchess County, New York", Torreya, 6: 63–67
- Eggleston, W.W. (1907), "New North American Crataegi", Torreya, 7: 35–36
- Eggleston, W.W. (1907), "The Linnaean and other early-known species of Crataegus", Torreya, 7: 153–154
- Eggleston, W.W. (1907), "Crataegus in New Mexico", Torreya, 7: 235–236
- Eggleston, W.W. (1908), "The Crataegi of the Northeastern United States and adjacent Canada", Rhodora, 10 (113): 73–84
- Eggleston, W.W. (1908), "Crataegus L. Hawthorn. White Thorn", in B.L. Robinson; M.L. Fernald (eds.), Gray's New Manual of Botany: A handbook of the flowering plants and ferns of the Central and Northeastern United States and Adjacent Canada, New York: American Book Company, pp. 460–479
- Eggleston, W.W. (1909), "The Crataegi of Mexico and Central America", Bulletin of the Torrey Botanical Club, 36 (9): 501–514, doi:10.2307/2479290, JSTOR 2479290
- Eggleston, W.W. (1909), "New North American Crataegi", Bulletin of the Torrey Botanical Club, 36 (11): 639–642, doi:10.2307/2478925, JSTOR 2478925
- Eggleston, W.W. (1910), "Sketches of the Crataegus problem, with special reference to work in the South.", Journal of the New York Botanical Garden, 11: 78–83
- Eggleston, W.W. (1911), "New Crataegi of the northeastern manual range", Bulletin of the Torrey Botanical Club, 38 (5): 243–244, doi:10.2307/2479389, JSTOR 2479389
- Eggleston, W.W. (1913), "Crataegus L. Sp. Pl. 475. 1753", in N. Britton; A. Brown (eds.), An illustrated flora of the Northern United States, Canada and the British possessions from Newfoundland to the parallel of the Southern boundary of Virginia, and from the Atlantic Ocean westward to the 102d meridian, vol. II: Portulacaceae to Menyanthaceae, New York: Charles Scribner's Sons, pp. 294–321
- Eggleston, W.W. (1915), "Crataegus. Hawthorn. Thorn-apple", in W.W. Eggleston; G.L. Kirk; J.G. Underwood (eds.), Flora of Vermont: List of ferns and seed plants growing without cultivation, Burlington: Vermont Botanical Club
- Eggleston, W.W. (1921), "Crataegus. Thorn apples. Red haws", in C.C. Deam (ed.), Trees of Indiana
- Eggleston, W.W. (1923), "Crataegus L.", in H.D. House (ed.), Report of the State Botanist for 1921, vol. 243, New York State Museum Bulletin, pp. 63–65
- Eggleston, W.W. (1924), "Crataegus L. Sp. Pl. 475. 1753", in H.D. House (ed.), Annotated list of the ferns and flowering plants of New York State, vol. 254, New York State Museum Bulletin, pp. 414–430
- Eggleston, W.W.; Rydberg, P.A.; Howe, M.A. (1932), "Crataegus L. Haw or Hawthorn", in P.A. Rydberg (ed.), Flora of the prairies and plains of central North America, New York: New York Botanical Garden
- Rydberg, P.A.; Eggleston, W.W. (1922), "Crataegus L. Haw or Hawthorn", in P.A. Rydberg (ed.), Flora of the Rocky Mountains and adjacent plains Colorado, Utah, Wyoming, Idaho, Montana, Saskatchewan, Alberta, and neighbouring parts of Nebraska, South Dakota, North Dakota, and British Columbia, New York: Published by the author
