= Wallowa, Oregon =

- City
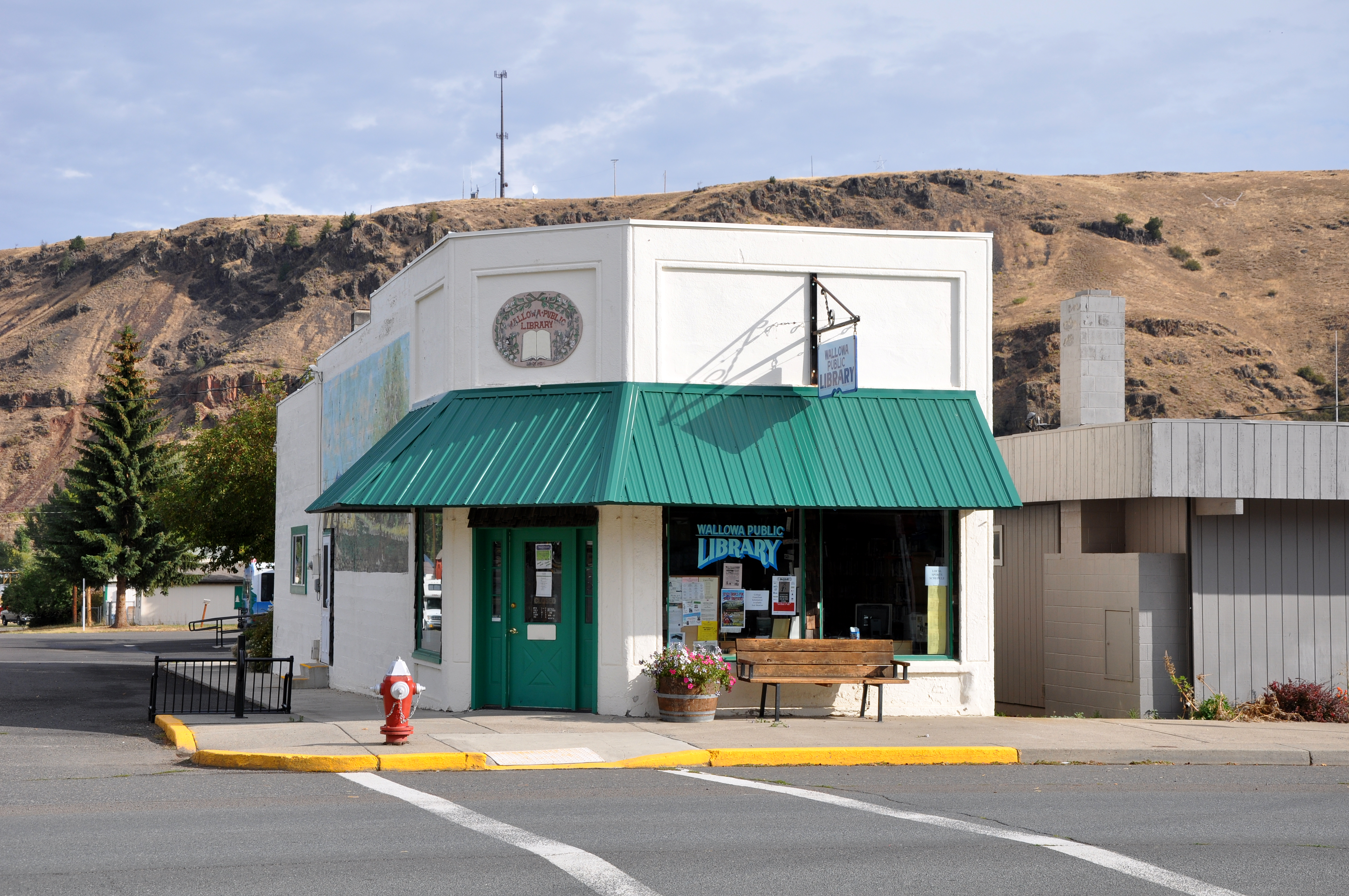
- Wallowa Public Library

- Location in Oregon
- Coordinates: 45°34′13″N 117°31′43″W
- Country: United States
- State: Oregon
- County: Wallowa
- Incorporated: 1899

Area
  - Total: 0.61 sq mi (1.58 km^{2})
  - Land: 0.61 sq mi (1.58 km^{2})
  - Water: 0 sq mi (0.00 km^{2})
- Elevation: 2,936 ft (895 m)

Population (2020)
  - Total: 796
  - Density: 1,302.9/sq mi (503.05/km^{2})
- Time zone: UTC-8 (Pacific)
  - Summer (DST): UTC-7 (Pacific)
- ZIP code: 97885
- Area code: 541
- FIPS code: 41-78150
- GNIS feature ID: 2412172
- Website: cityofwallowa.weebly.com

Wallowa (/wəˈlaʊwə/) is a city in Wallowa County, Oregon, United States. The population was 808 at the 2010 census.

== History ==
The Wallowa Valley is within the traditional lands of the Nez Perce. In the late 19th century, the Wallowa band was one of more than a dozen groups who lived across the inland Northwest as members of the Nez Perce tribe. The U.S. government sent the army to force them out after they refused to sign a treaty that would have removed them from their land. Chief Joseph led tribal members more than 1,000 miles to western Montana. They repeatedly battled with the army as they fled.

Wallowa was platted in 1889. Wallowa is a Nez Perce word describing a triangular structure of stakes that in turn supported a network of sticks called lacallas to form a fish trap. The Nez Perce put these traps in the Wallowa River below the outlet of Wallowa Lake. The author of Oregon Geographic Names, Lewis A. McArthur, said that although the origin of this name is disputed, he puts great weight in Levi Ankeny who supplied this information as he was "thoroughly familiar with the early history and tradition of the Wallowa Valley" and "on intimate terms with many Indians who knew the facts of the matter".

== Geography ==
According to the United States Census Bureau, the city has a total area of 0.61 square miles (1.58 km^{2}), all of it land.

=== Climate ===
This region experiences warm (but not hot) and dry summers, with no average monthly temperatures above 71.6 °F (22.0 °C). According to the Köppen Climate Classification system, Wallowa has a dry-summer humid continental climate, abbreviated "Dsb" on climate maps. The hottest temperature recorded in Wallowa was 110 °F (43.3 °C) on August 23, 1939, while the coldest temperature recorded was −38 °F (−38.9 °C) on December 13, 1919.

Climate data for Wallowa, Oregon, 1991–2020 normals, extremes 1903–present
Month	Jan	Feb	Mar	Apr	May	Jun	Jul	Aug	Sep	Oct	Nov	Dec	Year
Record high °F (°C)	64 (18)	67 (19)	79 (26)	90 (32)	98 (37)	109 (43)	108 (42)	110 (43)	103 (39)	92 (33)	74 (23)	67 (19)	110 (43)
Mean maximum °F (°C)	49.9 (9.9)	56.6 (13.7)	68.5 (20.3)	78.0 (25.6)	86.5 (30.3)	93.8 (34.3)	100.4 (38.0)	99.4 (37.4)	95.1 (35.1)	81.6 (27.6)	63.3 (17.4)	52.5 (11.4)	100.9 (38.3)
Mean daily maximum °F (°C)	35.9 (2.2)	43.0 (6.1)	52.4 (11.3)	59.9 (15.5)	69.3 (20.7)	76.5 (24.7)	87.7 (30.9)	87.7 (30.9)	78.9 (26.1)	62.8 (17.1)	45.8 (7.7)	35.7 (2.1)	61.3 (16.3)
Daily mean °F (°C)	28.0 (−2.2)	32.6 (0.3)	39.8 (4.3)	45.7 (7.6)	53.7 (12.1)	59.9 (15.5)	67.2 (19.6)	66.4 (19.1)	58.7 (14.8)	47.0 (8.3)	35.5 (1.9)	27.5 (−2.5)	46.8 (8.2)
Mean daily minimum °F (°C)	20.1 (−6.6)	22.2 (−5.4)	27.3 (−2.6)	31.6 (−0.2)	38.0 (3.3)	43.3 (6.3)	46.7 (8.2)	45.2 (7.3)	38.4 (3.6)	31.1 (−0.5)	25.1 (−3.8)	19.3 (−7.1)	32.4 (0.2)
Mean minimum °F (°C)	−1.9 (−18.8)	3.8 (−15.7)	14.4 (−9.8)	20.0 (−6.7)	25.1 (−3.8)	32.2 (0.1)	36.6 (2.6)	35.0 (1.7)	27.1 (−2.7)	16.9 (−8.4)	8.5 (−13.1)	0.4 (−17.6)	−7.5 (−21.9)
Record low °F (°C)	−34 (−37)	−33 (−36)	−14 (−26)	5 (−15)	16 (−9)	26 (−3)	22 (−6)	22 (−6)	16 (−9)	5 (−15)	−22 (−30)	−38 (−39)	−38 (−39)
Average precipitation inches (mm)	1.75 (44)	1.61 (41)	1.59 (40)	1.64 (42)	2.16 (55)	1.59 (40)	0.51 (13)	0.78 (20)	0.74 (19)	1.52 (39)	1.95 (50)	2.14 (54)	17.98 (457)
Average snowfall inches (cm)	12.4 (31)	10.4 (26)	3.2 (8.1)	1.0 (2.5)	0.1 (0.25)	0.0 (0.0)	0.0 (0.0)	0.0 (0.0)	0.0 (0.0)	0.2 (0.51)	5.8 (15)	14.8 (38)	47.9 (121.36)
Average precipitation days (≥ 0.01 in)	12.8	11.2	12.8	11.3	11.8	8.9	3.6	4.6	5.3	10.5	14.6	14.2	121.6
Average snowy days (≥ 0.1 in)	7.2	4.6	2.8	0.9	0.2	0.0	0.0	0.0	0.0	0.3	3.8	8.2	28.0
Source 1: NOAA
Source 2: National Weather Service

== Demographics ==
Historical population
Census	Pop.	Note	%±
1900	243		—
1910	793		226.3%
1920	894		12.7%
1930	749		−16.2%
1940	838		11.9%
1950	1,055		25.9%
1960	989		−6.3%
1970	811		−18.0%
1980	847		4.4%
1990	748		−11.7%
2000	869		16.2%
2010	808		−7.0%
2020	796		−1.5%
U.S. Decennial Census

=== 2020 census ===
As of the 2020 census, Wallowa had a population of 796. The median age was 49.8 years, with 18.6% of residents under the age of 18 and 27.0% of residents 65 years of age or older. For every 100 females there were 86.9 males, and for every 100 females age 18 and over there were 88.4 males age 18 and over.

There were 377 households in Wallowa, of which 26.3% had children under the age of 18 living in them. Of all households, 44.0% were married-couple households, 18.6% were households with a male householder and no spouse or partner present, and 28.4% were households with a female householder and no spouse or partner present. About 31.8% of all households were made up of individuals and 14.8% had someone living alone who was 65 years of age or older.

There were 407 housing units, of which 7.4% were vacant. Among occupied housing units, 68.7% were owner-occupied and 31.3% were renter-occupied. The homeowner vacancy rate was <0.1% and the rental vacancy rate was <0.1%.

0% of residents lived in urban areas, while 100.0% lived in rural areas.

Racial composition as of the 2020 census
Race	Number	Percent
White	704	88.4%
Black or African American	0	0%
American Indian and Alaska Native	11	1.4%
Asian	0	0%
Native Hawaiian and Other Pacific Islander	0	0%
Some other race	15	1.9%
Two or more races	66	8.3%
Hispanic or Latino (of any race)	29	3.6%

=== 2010 census ===
As of the census of 2010, there were 808 people, 352 households, and 222 families residing in the city. The population density was 1,324.6 inhabitants per square mile (511.4/km^{2}). There were 394 housing units at an average density of 645.9 per square mile (249.4/km^{2}). The racial makeup of the city was 95.9% White, 0.5% African American, 0.4% Native American, 0.4% from other races, and 2.8% from two or more races. Hispanic or Latino of any race were 2.0% of the population.

There were 352 households, of which 25.3% had children under the age of 18 living with them, 50.0% were married couples living together, 9.7% had a female householder with no husband present, 3.4% had a male householder with no wife present, and 36.9% were non-families. 31.8% of all households were made up of individuals, and 16.5% had someone living alone who was 65 years of age or older. The average household size was 2.24 and the average family size was 2.82.

The median age in the city was 48.2 years. 20.7% of residents were under the age of 18; 5.8% were between the ages of 18 and 24; 18.4% were from 25 to 44; 34.2% were from 45 to 64; and 21% were 65 years of age or older. The gender makeup of the city was 49.3% male and 50.7% female.

=== 2000 census ===
As of the census of 2000, there were 869 people, 350 households, and 248 families residing in the city. The population density was 1,414.7 inhabitants per square mile (546.2/km^{2}). There were 396 housing units at an average density of 644.7 per square mile (248.9/km^{2}). The racial makeup of the city was 95.51% White, 0.12% African American, 0.46% Native American, 0.12% Asian, 1.73% from other races, and 2.07% from two or more races. Hispanic or Latino of any race were 2.99% of the population.

There were 350 households, out of which 34.6% had children under the age of 18 living with them, 56.9% were married couples living together, 10.9% had a female householder with no husband present, and 28.9% were non-families. 26.9% of all households were made up of individuals, and 14.9% had someone living alone who was 65 years of age or older. The average household size was 2.48 and the average family size was 3.00.

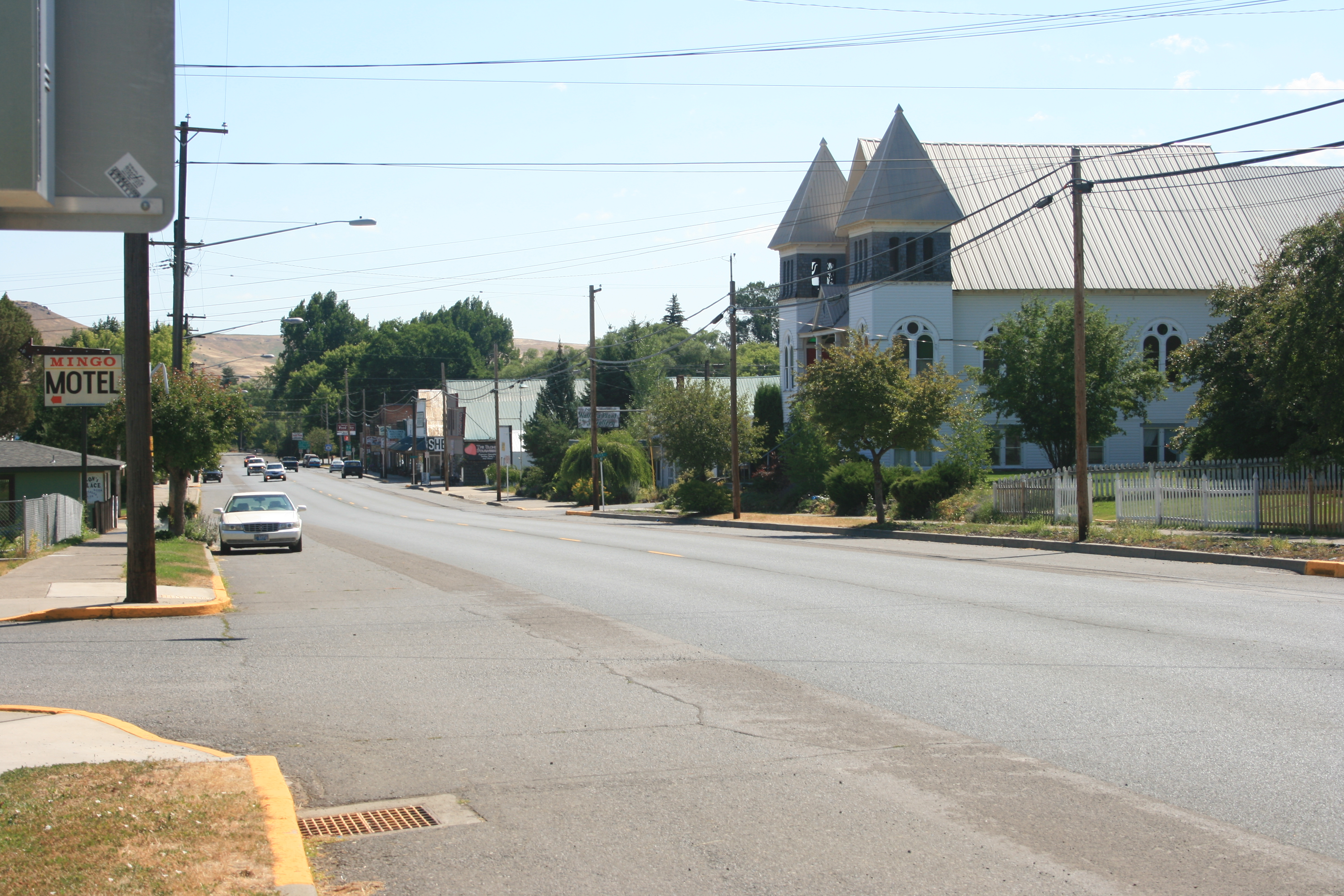
Looking east in Wallowa

In the city, the population was spread out, with 29.8% under the age of 18, 4.3% from 18 to 24, 23.1% from 25 to 44, 23.9% from 45 to 64, and 18.9% who were 65 years of age or older. The median age was 41 years. For every 100 females, there were 101.6 males. For every 100 females age 18 and over, there were 92.4 males.

The median income for a household in the city was $28,603, and the median income for a family was $31,964. Males had a median income of $30,313 versus $15,417 for females. The per capita income for the city was $14,203. About 19.5% of families and 22.0% of the population were below the poverty line, including 33.1% of those under age 18 and 13.6% of those age 65 or over.

== Annual cultural events ==
The Tamkaliks Celebration is a powwow named after the Nez Perce word for where you can see the mountains. It began in 1991 to welcome the Nez Perce back home to the Wallowa Valley.

== Notable people ==
- Amos Marsh
- Frank Wayne Marsh
- Pearl Alice Marsh
- Ronald Gladden

== Education ==
It is in the Wallowa School District 12. All district schools are on one property. In 2018, 35 people worked for the district, and enrollment was around 195. Their mission statement is "Through Student learning, Strategic Teaching, teamwork, and flexibility, all Wallowa School District students will become successful and positive contributors to society."

=== Wallowa Elementary School ===
Wallowa Elementary School educates grades preschool through six. They have approximately 100 students. 62% of their student population is economically disadvantaged. 11% of their student population have a disability. The school also has a student-run newspaper called the Cougar Club Chronicle; it is run by the fifth-grade class.

=== Wallowa Jr./Sr. High School ===
Wallowa High School currently educates grades seven through twelve. They have had a 100% graduation rate since 2012. The high school used to house all K-12 students, until their student population grew large enough to require the building of their elementary school. Their mascot is the cougar and their school colors are orange and black. Their choir program was restarted in 2015 and placed at state the same year. There is a FFA (Future Farmers of America) program that many students take part in.

== Gallery ==
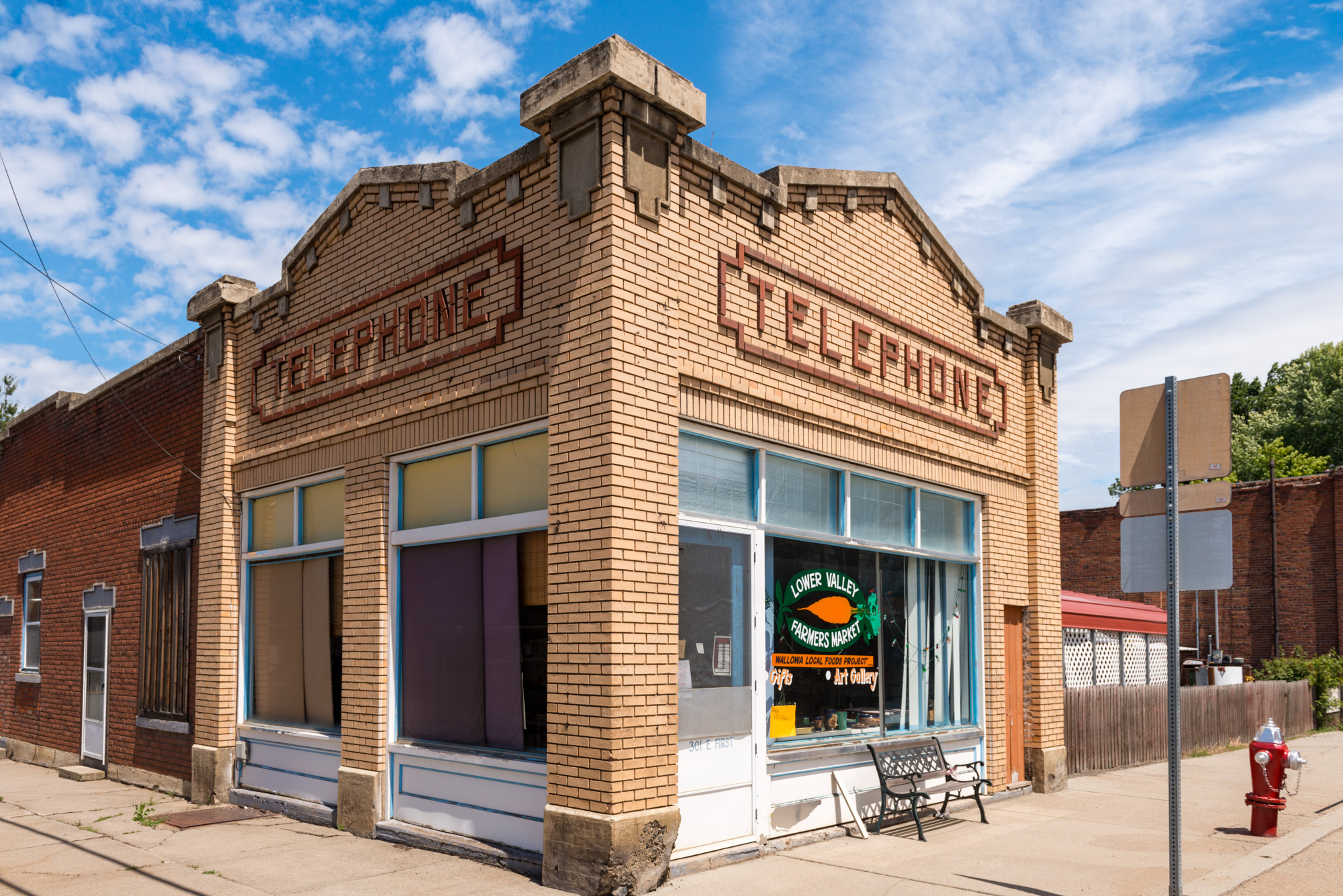
Old telephone building in downtown Wallowa

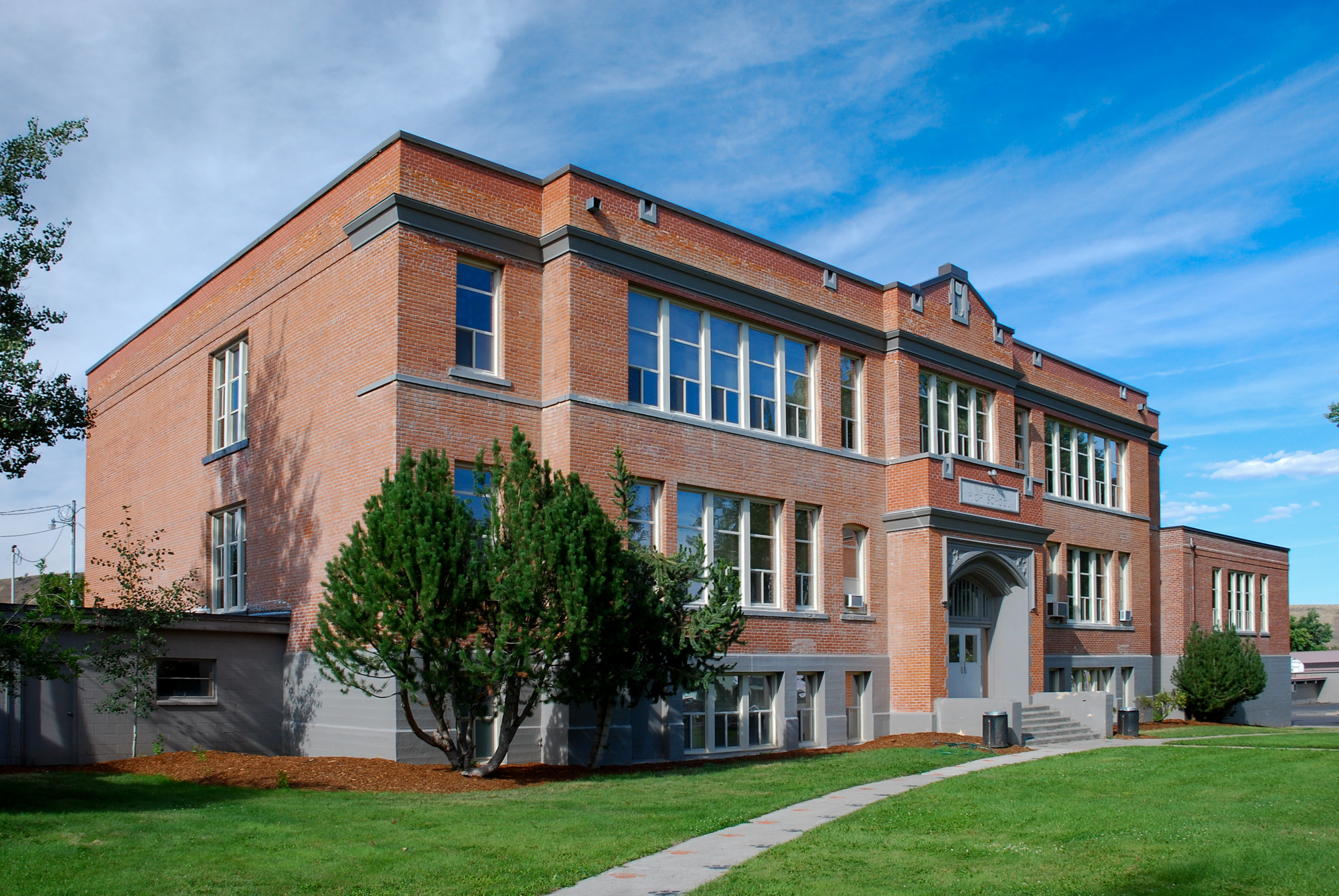
Wallowa High School

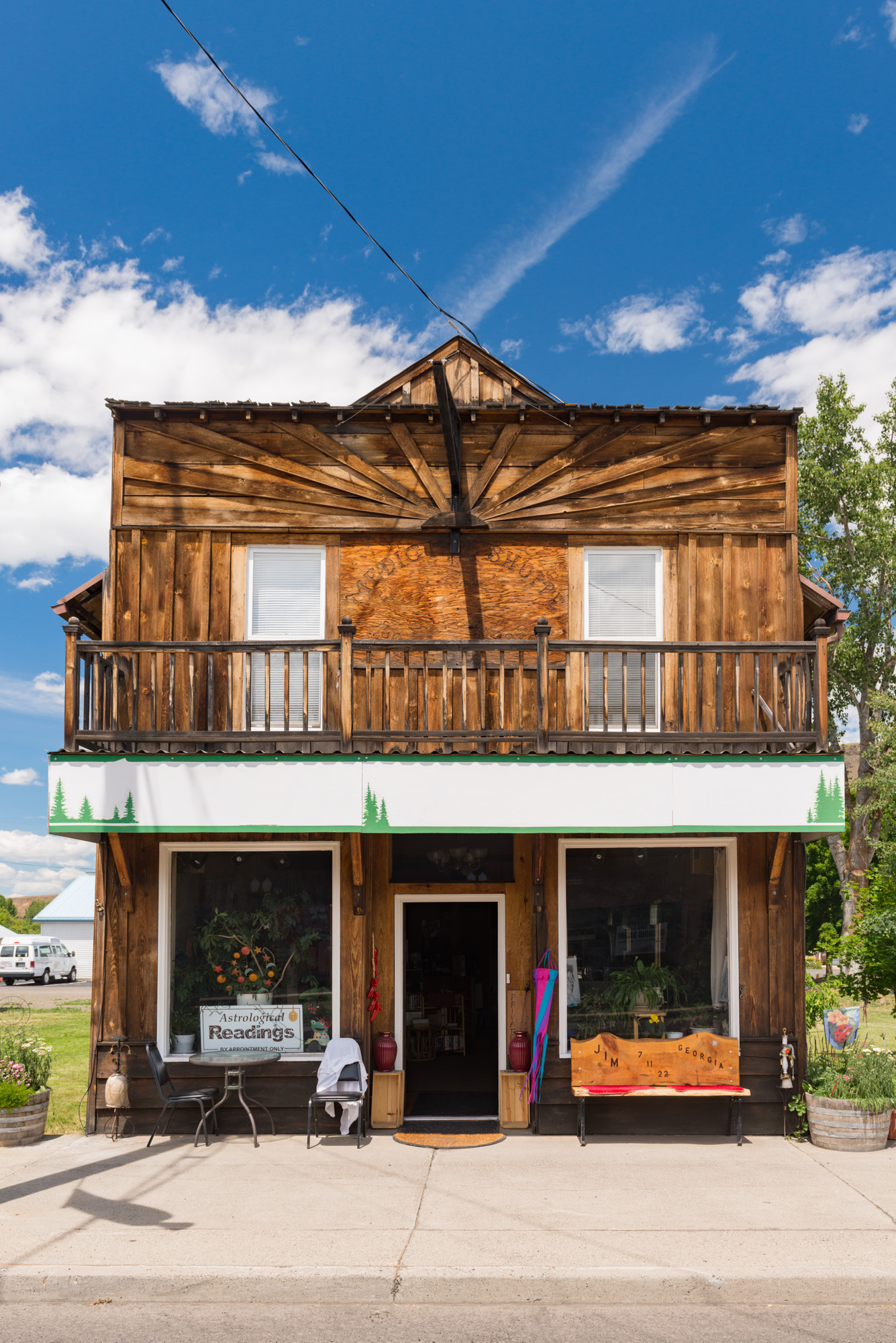
Storefront in Wallowa

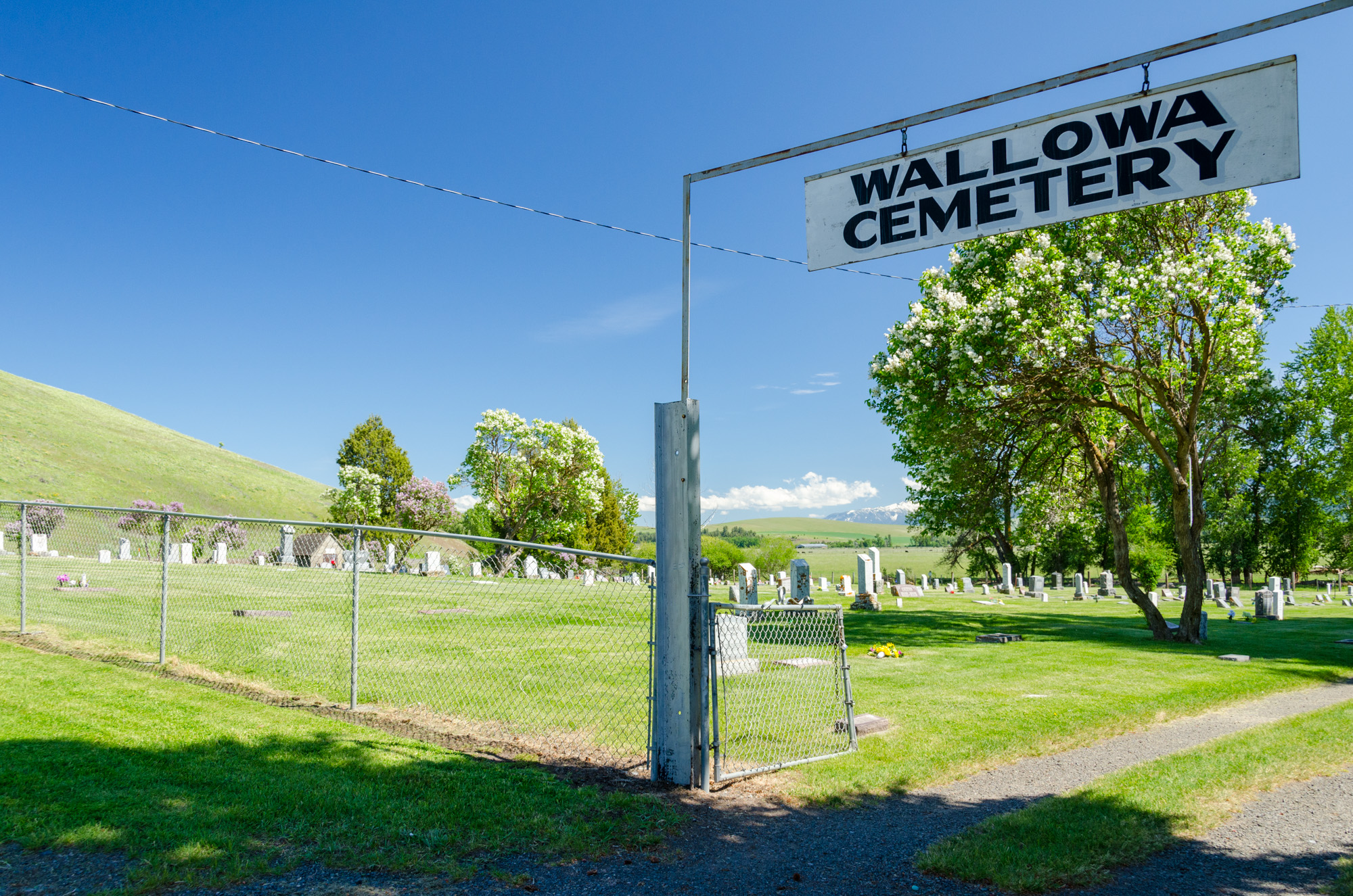
Wallowa Cemetery, one mile east of Wallowa

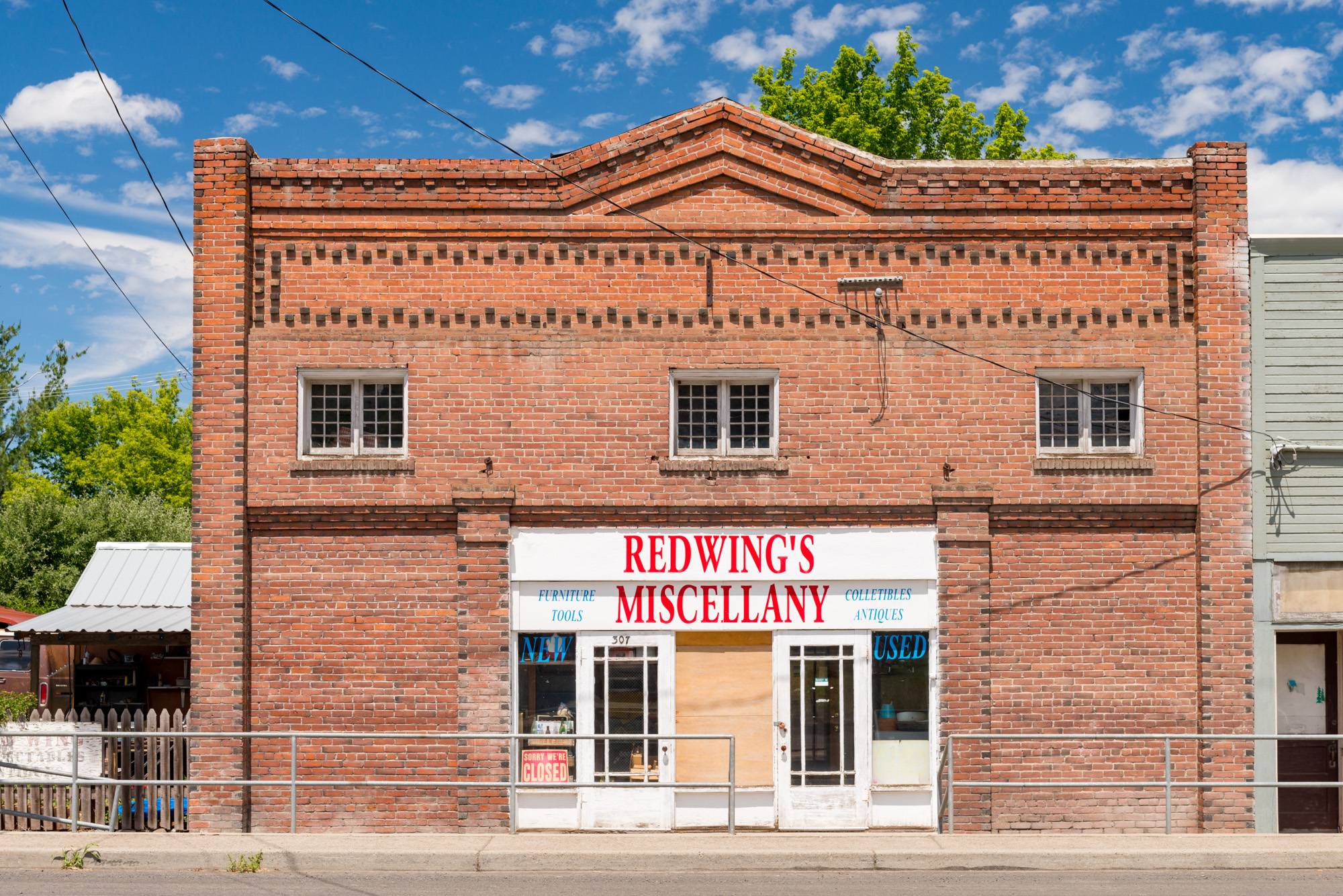
Old building in downtown Wallowa

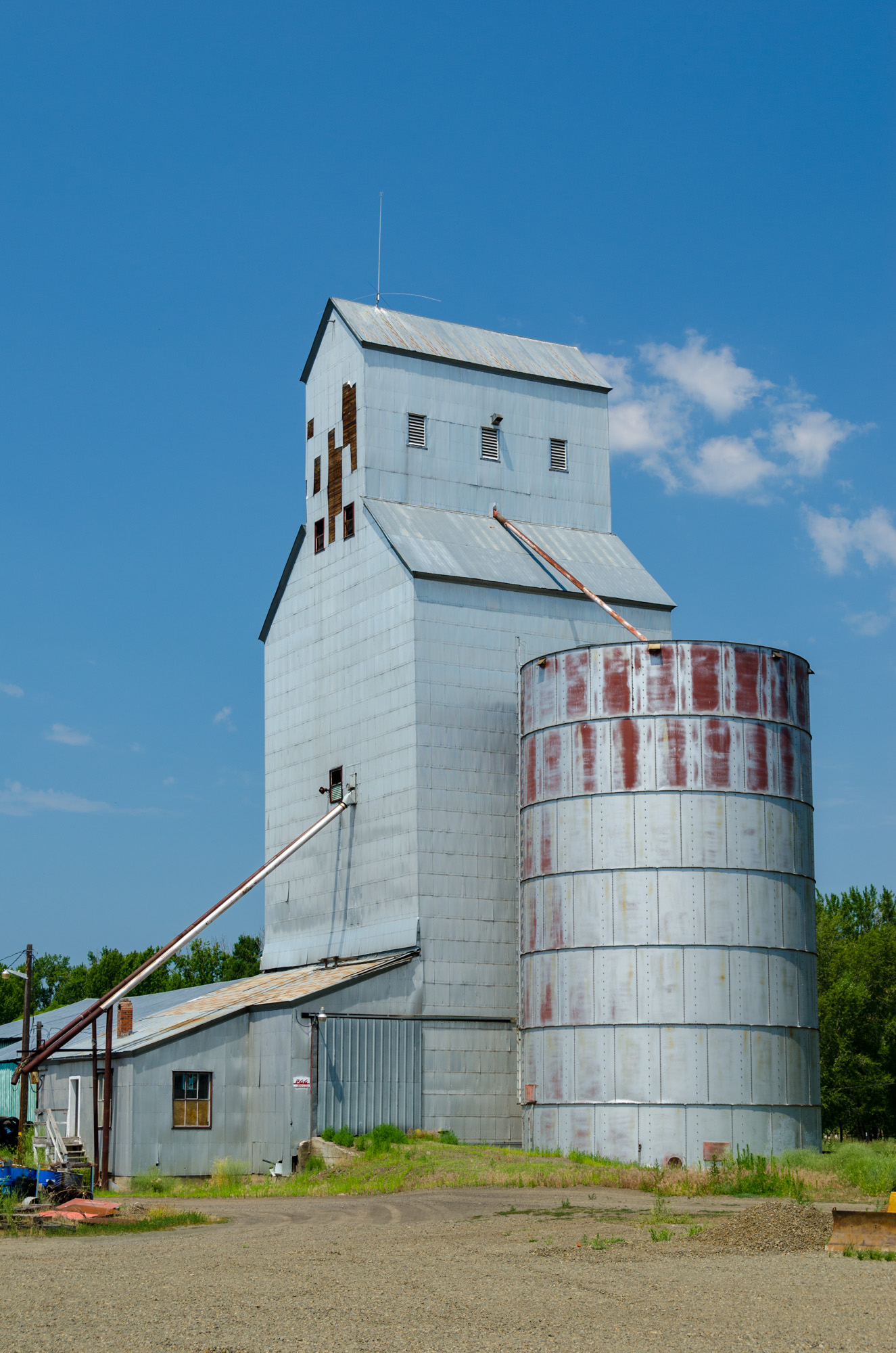
Grain elevator in Wallowa
