= Bob Jenson =

American politician

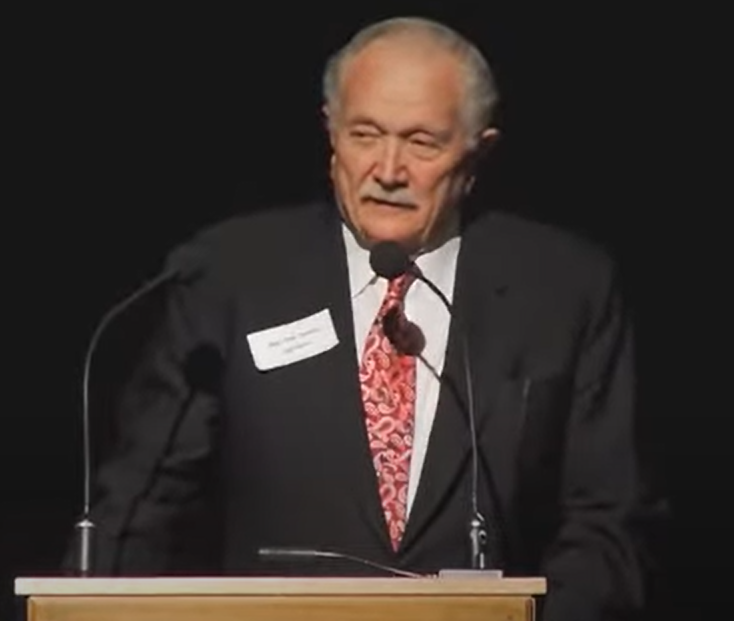
- Jenson in 2012

Member of the Oregon House of Representatives from the 58th district
- In office 1997–2015
- Preceded by: Chuck Norris
- Succeeded by: Greg Barreto

Personal details
- Born: May 11, 1931 Omaha, Nebraska
- Died: January 6, 2018 (aged 86) Pendleton, Oregon
- Party: Republican
- Spouse: Evelyn
- Profession: Teacher
- Bob Jenson's voice Jenson receives the Oregon Department of Agriculture's 2012 Individual Contribution to Agriculture award Recorded March 29, 2012

Robert Eugene Jenson (May 11, 1931 – January 6, 2018) was a Republican politician from the U.S. state of Oregon. He served in the Oregon House of Representatives representing District 58, which encompassed Union County, Wallowa County, and portions of Umatilla County. District 58 included the cities Pendleton, La Grande, and Enterprise. Jenson served in the Oregon House since 1997 until 2015. At the time of his retirement, as the member with the most seniority, he held the honorary title of Dean of the House.

== Early life and career ==
Jenson was born on a ranch in Omaha, Nebraska in 1931. He received a bachelor of science degree and master's degree in United States History from Montana State University. He served in the United States Air Force from 1950 to 1954 and then worked as an airport commissioner.

Jenson moved to eastern Oregon in 1967 and taught at Blue Mountain Community College for 26 years. He also taught high school for 4 years.

== Political career ==
In 1996, Jenson ran as a Democrat for the seat in the Oregon House of Representatives vacated by Chuck Norris, who did not seek re-election, defeating Republican Don Armstrong. In 1998, Jenson changed his party affiliation to Independent after becoming dischanted with what he considered extreme environmental positions of the Democratic Party. He was re-elected to the House as an Independent in 1998, and then a year later, became a Republican.

He was re-elected as a Republican in 2000, and won re-election to the House every two years until 2014, when he did not run for reelection.

== Personal ==
Jenson and his wife Evelyn lived in Pendleton. They had four children. He died from cancer on January 6, 2018, at his home in Pendleton.

== Electoral history ==
2004 Oregon State Representative, 58th district
Party	Candidate	Votes	%
Republican	Bob Jenson	16,176	98.1
Write-in		310	1.9
Total votes		16,486	100%

2006 Oregon State Representative, 58th district
Party	Candidate	Votes	%
Republican	Bob Jenson	10,194	68.6
Democratic	Ben Talley	4,629	31.2
Write-in		31	0.2
Total votes		14,854	100%

2008 Oregon State Representative, 58th district
Party	Candidate	Votes	%
Republican	Bob Jenson	13,204	71.1
Democratic	Ben Talley	5,311	28.6
Write-in		61	0.3
Total votes		18,576	100%

2010 Oregon State Representative, 58th district
Party	Candidate	Votes	%
Republican	Bob Jenson	11,310	74.4
Democratic	Pete Wells	3,772	24.8
Write-in		123	0.8
Total votes		15,205	100%

2012 Oregon State Representative, 58th district
Party	Candidate	Votes	%
Republican	Bob Jenson	19,497	75.9
Democratic	Heidi Van Schoonhoven	6,066	23.6
Write-in		119	0.5
Total votes		25,682	100%
