= Greg Barreto =

American businessman and politician

Member of the Oregon House of Representatives from the 58th district
- In office January 11, 2015 – January 11, 2021
- Preceded by: Bob Jenson
- Succeeded by: Bobby Levy

Personal details
- Party: Republican
- Spouse: Chris Barreto

Greg Barreto is an American businessman and politician. He represented district 58 in northeastern Oregon in the State House of Representatives from January 2015 to January 2021. He is a member of the Republican Party.

House district 58 includes all of Union County and Wallowa County, as well as portions of Umatilla County.

== Business career ==
In 1982, Barreto invented a hydraulic rototiller. He and his wife founded Barreto Manufacturing in 1984 in Keizer, Oregon, moving to La Grande, Oregon, in 1986.

== Political career ==
Barreto was elected to the Oregon State House of Representatives in 2014. He succeeded Dean of the House, Republican Bob Jenson. Barreto was selected to serve on the Agriculture and Natural Resources Committee, Business and Labor Committee and Education Committee during the 78th Legislative Assembly.

On December 11, 2020, Barreto and 11 other state Republican officials signed a letter requesting Oregon Attorney General Ellen Rosenblum join Texas and other states contesting the results of the 2020 presidential election in Texas v. Pennsylvania. Rosenblum announced she had filed in behalf of the defense, and against Texas, the day prior.

== Personal life ==
Barreto and his wife, Chris, a RNC National committeewomen, reside in Cove. They have eight children.

== Electoral history ==
2014 Oregon State Representative, 58th district
Party	Candidate	Votes	%
Republican	Greg Barreto	16,728	73.2
Democratic	Heidi Van Schoonhoven	5,667	24.8
Write-in		461	2.0
Total votes		22,856	100%

2016 Oregon State Representative, 58th district
Party	Candidate	Votes	%
Republican	Greg Barreto	23,010	97.3
Write-in		642	2.7
Total votes		23,652	100%

2018 Oregon State Representative, 58th district
Party	Candidate	Votes	%
Republican	Greg Barreto	19,828	75.4
Independent	Skye Farnam	6,382	24.3
Write-in		94	0.4
Total votes		26,304	100%
