= Amos Marsh =

American football player (1939–1992)

No. 31
- Position: Running back

Personal information
- Born: May 7, 1939; Williams, Arizona, U.S.
- Died: November 2, 1992 (aged 53); San Jose, California, U.S.
- Listed height: 6 ft 0 in (1.83 m)
- Listed weight: 220 lb (100 kg)

Career information
- High school: Wallowa (OR)
- College: Oregon State (1957–1960)
- NFL draft: 1961: undrafted

Career history
- Dallas Cowboys (1961–1964); Detroit Lions (1965–1967); Atlanta Falcons (1968)*
- * Offseason or practice squad member only

Awards and highlights
- NFL All-rookie team (1961)

Career NFL statistics
- Rushing yards: 3,222
- Rushing average: 4.3
- Receptions: 133
- Receiving yards: 1,384
- Total touchdowns: 33
- Stats at Pro Football Reference

Amos Marsh Jr. (May 7, 1939 – November 2, 1992) was an American professional football running back in the National Football League (NFL) for the Dallas Cowboys and Detroit Lions. He played college football at Oregon State University.

== Early life ==
Marsh was the starting running back at Wallowa High School, contributing to the team's Tu-Valley football co-championship in 1957, which was a three-way tie with Enterprise and Union, but only Wallowa advanced to the state playoffs after a vote by the league's school superintendents.

As a sprinter and long jumper in track, Marsh helped Wallowa win the 1957 State Class "B" title. During those years, he developed a famous rivalry with Jim Puckett from Cove High School. The two raced in the 100 yard dash competition, with Puckett winning every contest, making Marsh the 100-yard dash state runner up three times (1956–1958). The 100-yard dash is no longer practiced and was run from 1927 to 1977.

== College career ==
Marsh accepted an Oregon State University track and field scholarship, where he competed as a sprinter, hurdler and a broad jumper. In college, he repeatedly beat Puckett, who ran representing the University of Oregon.

He also played football as a wingback, halfback, split end and kicker. He was part of the 14–0 upset to the No. 6 ranked University of Southern California at the Los Angeles Coliseum on September 16, 1960. The Trojans were ranked No. 1 in the preseason by Playboy magazine and it was the last time an OSU team experienced victory at USC until 2021.

As a senior, he was moved to split end but did not have much success, catching only 10 passes. He was selected to be a part of the North-South Shrine Game. In 1960, he was the Northwest sprint champion in both the 100 and 220.

== Professional career ==
=== Dallas Cowboys ===
Marsh was signed as an undrafted free agent by the Dallas Cowboys after the 1961 NFL draft, because they were impressed by his speed. He also was a powerful player, earning the nicknames "Moose" and "Forward Marsh". He started his career as a wide receiver and special teams player. He was eventually moved to fullback to take advantage of his size and speed, while splitting time with J. W. Lockett. He led the team in kickoff and punt returns. He set franchise records with a 71-yard run from scrimmage and a 79-yard kickoff return.

In 1962, he played fullback alongside Don Perkins, ranking seventh in the NFL with 802 yards and a 5.6-yard average per carry. That year, he set a franchise record with an 85-yard touchdown reception against the Los Angeles Rams and also broke his franchise record for the longest kickoff return with 101 yards, which was broken by Alexander Wright 29 years later in 1991. The play came against the Philadelphia Eagles, when the Cowboys became the first NFL team in history to produce two 100-yard plays in the same game: a 100-yard interception return for a touchdown by strong safety Mike Gaechter and the 101 yard kickoff return for a touchdown by Marsh.

In 1964, he was moved to halfback, with Perkins taking over the fullback position. Marsh's production regressed during the following years, while alternating with Jim Stiger. On September 9, 1965, he was traded to the Detroit Lions, after the team acquired fullback J.D. Smith. The Cowboys selected Walt Garrison with the fifth round draft choice they obtained in the transaction.

=== Detroit Lions ===
Playing as a fullback in 1965, he led the Detroit Lions in rushing (405 yards) and touchdowns (8). On August 19, 1968, he was traded to the Atlanta Falcons in exchange for a conditional 1969 draft pick (not exercised).

=== Atlanta Falcons ===
On September 2, 1969, he was waived by the Atlanta Falcons before the start of the season.

== NFL career statistics ==
Legend
**Bold**	Career high

Year	Team	Games		Rushing					Receiving				
Year	Team	GP	GS	Att	Yds	Avg	Lng	TD	Rec	Yds	Avg	Lng	TD
1961	DAL	14	7	84	379	4.5	**71**	1	21	189	9.0	46	**2**
1962	DAL	14	14	**144**	**802**	**5.6**	70	**6**	**35**	**467**	13.3	**85**	**2**
1963	DAL	14	9	99	483	4.9	41	5	26	224	8.6	35	0
1964	DAL	12	5	100	401	4.0	28	2	15	131	8.7	32	0
1965	DET	13	7	131	495	3.8	62	**6**	17	159	9.4	48	**2**
1966	DET	14	12	134	433	3.2	27	3	12	111	9.3	20	0
1967	DET	14	6	58	229	3.9	25	2	7	103	**14.7**	35	1
Career		95	60	750	3,222	4.3	71	25	133	1,384	10.4	85	7

== Personal life ==
His brother Frank also went on to play professional football and then into professional basketball.

Marsh died on November 2, 1992, after suffering a series of strokes, because of his diabetes condition.
