= Oregon's 58th House district =

Legislative districts in the state of Oregon

Oregon's 58th House district after redistricting after the 2020 Census

District 58 of the Oregon House of Representatives is one of 60 House legislative districts in the state of Oregon. As of 2021, the boundary for the district contains all of Union and Wallowa counties and a portion of Umatilla County. The district contains the population centers of La Grande and Pendleton as well as Hells Canyon, the Umatilla Indian Reservation, and the campus of Eastern Oregon University. The current representative for the district is Republican Bobby Levy of Echo.

== Election results ==
District boundaries have changed over time. Therefore, representatives before 2021 may not represent the same constituency as today. General election results from 2000 to present are as follows:

Year	Candidate	Party	Percent	Opponent	Party	Percent	Write-in percentage
2000	Mark Simmons	Republican	73.48%	Bruce Campbell	Democratic	26.52%	
2002 (Note: Bob Jenson was the incumbent in this election. He previously represented District 57, but was moved to this district due to redistricting following the 2000 United States census.)	Bob Jenson	Republican	97.19%	Unopposed			2.81%
2004	Bob Jenson	Republican	98.12%	Unopposed			1.88%
2006	Bob Jenson	Republican	68.63%	Ben Talley	Democratic	31.16%	0.21%
2008	Bob Jenson	Republican	71.08%	Ben Talley	Democratic	28.59%	0.33%
2010	Bob Jenson	Republican	74.41%	Pete Wells	Democratic	24.78%	0.81%
2012	Bob Jenson	Republican	75.92%	Heidi Von Schoonhoven	Democratic	23.62%	0.46%
2014	Greg Barreto	Republican	73.19%	Heidi Von Schoonhoven	Democratic	24.79%	2.02%
2016	Greg Barreto	Republican	97.29%	Unopposed			2.71%
2018	Greg Barreto	Republican	75.38%	Skye Farnam	Independent	24.26%	0.36%
2020	Bobby Levy	Republican	72.79%	Nolan Bylenga	Democratic	27.04%	0.17%
2022	Bobby Levy	Republican	83.66%	Jesse Bonifer	Democratic	15.19%	1.15%
2024	Bobby Levy	Republican	98.2%	Unopposed			1.8%

== See also ==
- Oregon Legislative Assembly
- Oregon House of Representatives
