= Cove, Oregon =

- City
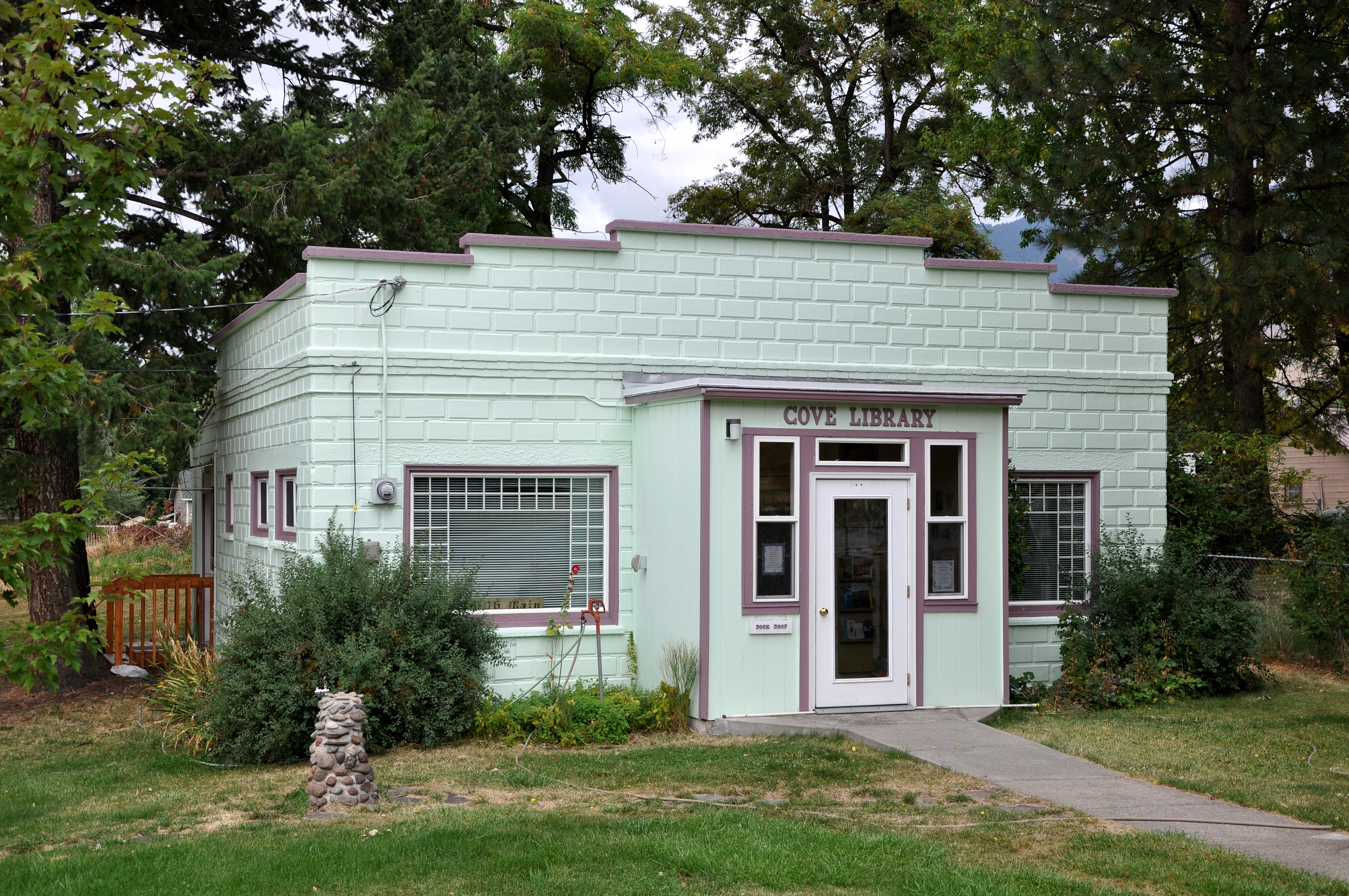
- Cove Library

- Location in Oregon
- Coordinates: 45°17′47″N 117°48′37″W
- Country: United States
- State: Oregon
- County: Union
- Incorporated: 1904

Government
  - Mayor: Sherry Haeger

Area
  - Total: 0.80 sq mi (2.08 km^{2})
  - Land: 0.80 sq mi (2.08 km^{2})
  - Water: 0 sq mi (0.00 km^{2})
- Elevation: 2,914 ft (888 m)

Population (2020)
  - Total: 620
  - Density: 770.9/sq mi (297.66/km^{2})
- Time zone: UTC-8 (Pacific)
  - Summer (DST): UTC-7 (Pacific)
- ZIP code: 97824
- Area code: 541
- FIPS code: 41-16250
- GNIS feature ID: 2410249
- Website: cityofcove.org

Cove is a city in Union County, Oregon, United States. The population was 620 at the 2020 census.

== History ==
This area was well known to the Cayuse and Nez Perce Tribes who referred to it as Wiweeletitpe (wee-walla-tit-puh), meaning "Many creeks flowing at that place". Euro-Americans first settled here in 1862, and in 1863 they established a post office named Forest Cove. Samuel G. French was the first postmaster. To avoid confusion between Forest Cove and another Oregon community, Forest Grove in Washington County, post office authorities changed the name to Cove in 1868. Cove was platted in the 1870s along Ruckles Road, only the second road over the Blue Mountains.

== Geography ==
Cove lies east of La Grande and north of Union along the eastern edge of the Grande Ronde Valley of northeastern Oregon. Mill Creek, a tributary of the Grande Ronde River, flows west from the Wallowa Mountains through Cove. Mount Fanny rises to about 7,200 feet (2,200 m) about 3 miles (5 km) east of the city.

According to the United States Census Bureau, the city has a total area of 0.77 square miles (1.99 km^{2}), all of it land. Oregon Route 237 passes through Cove.

=== Climate ===
This region experiences warm (but not hot) and dry summers, with no average monthly temperatures above 71.6 °F (22.0 °C). According to the Köppen Climate Classification system, Cove has a warm-summer Mediterranean climate, abbreviated "Csb" on climate maps.

The average total annual precipitation in Cove is about 22 inches (560 mm). July has the highest average maximum temperature, about 83 °F (28 °C), while January has the lowest average minimum, 21 °F (−6 °C).

Climate data for Cove
Month	Jan	Feb	Mar	Apr	May	Jun	Jul	Aug	Sep	Oct	Nov	Dec	Year
Record high °F (°C)	64 (18)	67 (19)	76 (24)	84 (29)	94 (34)	99 (37)	103 (39)	107 (42)	100 (38)	88 (31)	75 (24)	67 (19)	107 (42)
Mean daily maximum °F (°C)	37.4 (3.0)	42.6 (5.9)	49.5 (9.7)	57.9 (14.4)	66.3 (19.1)	73.4 (23.0)	84.2 (29.0)	83.5 (28.6)	74.1 (23.4)	61.9 (16.6)	47.7 (8.7)	39.2 (4.0)	59.8 (15.4)
Mean daily minimum °F (°C)	22.2 (−5.4)	25.6 (−3.6)	29.4 (−1.4)	33.8 (1.0)	39.5 (4.2)	44.8 (7.1)	49.7 (9.8)	48.4 (9.1)	41.8 (5.4)	35.5 (1.9)	29.8 (−1.2)	24.2 (−4.3)	35.4 (1.9)
Record low °F (°C)	−28 (−33)	−22 (−30)	−14 (−26)	10 (−12)	21 (−6)	27 (−3)	32 (0)	30 (−1)	18 (−8)	7 (−14)	−15 (−26)	−24 (−31)	−28 (−33)
Average precipitation inches (mm)	2.24 (57)	1.74 (44)	2.1 (53)	2.3 (58)	2.56 (65)	2.21 (56)	0.57 (14)	0.79 (20)	1.28 (33)	1.86 (47)	2.55 (65)	2.31 (59)	22.53 (572)
Average snowfall inches (cm)	11.3 (29)	7.2 (18)	6.4 (16)	2.8 (7.1)	0.1 (0.25)	0 (0)	0 (0)	0 (0)	0.1 (0.25)	0.3 (0.76)	2.9 (7.4)	8.5 (22)	39.6 (101)
Average precipitation days	13	11	12	11	10	9	3	4	5	8	12	13	111

== Demographics ==
Historical population
Census	Pop.	Note	%±
1890	223		—
1910	433		—
1920	399		−7.9%
1930	307		−23.1%
1940	321		4.6%
1950	282		−12.1%
1960	311		10.3%
1970	363		16.7%
1980	451		24.2%
1990	507		12.4%
2000	594		17.2%
2010	552		−7.1%
2020	620		12.3%
U.S. Decennial Census

=== 2020 census ===
As of the 2020 census, Cove had a population of 620. The median age was 47.8 years. 21.9% of residents were under the age of 18 and 28.5% of residents were 65 years of age or older. For every 100 females there were 92.5 males, and for every 100 females age 18 and over there were 92.8 males age 18 and over.

0% of residents lived in urban areas, while 100.0% lived in rural areas.

There were 272 households in Cove, of which 25.4% had children under the age of 18 living in them. Of all households, 46.7% were married-couple households, 20.2% were households with a male householder and no spouse or partner present, and 25.0% were households with a female householder and no spouse or partner present. About 29.7% of all households were made up of individuals and 16.6% had someone living alone who was 65 years of age or older.

There were 280 housing units, of which 2.9% were vacant. Among occupied housing units, 76.1% were owner-occupied and 23.9% were renter-occupied. The homeowner vacancy rate was <0.1% and the rental vacancy rate was 1.5%.

Racial composition as of the 2020 census
Race	Number	Percent
White	563	90.8%
Black or African American	1	0.2%
American Indian and Alaska Native	9	1.5%
Asian	4	0.6%
Native Hawaiian and Other Pacific Islander	0	0%
Some other race	5	0.8%
Two or more races	38	6.1%
Hispanic or Latino (of any race)	21	3.4%

=== 2010 census ===
As of the census of 2010, there were 552 people, 240 households, and 161 families residing in the city. The population density was 716.9 inhabitants per square mile (276.8/km^{2}). There were 257 housing units at an average density of 333.8 per square mile (128.9/km^{2}). The racial makeup of the city was 91.1% White, 0.7% Native American, 1.6% Asian, 0.2% Pacific Islander, 1.6% from other races, and 4.7% from two or more races. Hispanic or Latino of any race were 3.6% of the population.

There were 240 households, of which 28.3% had children under the age of 18 living with them, 56.7% were married couples living together, 7.9% had a female householder with no husband present, 2.5% had a male householder with no wife present, and 32.9% were non-families. 30.0% of all households were made up of individuals, and 14.6% had someone living alone who was 65 years of age or older. The average household size was 2.30 and the average family size was 2.75.

The median age in the city was 50 years. 22.1% of residents were under the age of 18; 3.4% were between the ages of 18 and 24; 17.6% were from 25 to 44; 33.7% were from 45 to 64; and 23.2% were 65 years of age or older. The gender makeup of the city was 48.9% male and 51.1% female.

=== 2000 census ===
As of the census of 2000, there were 594 people, 231 households, and 176 families residing in the city. The population density was 732.9 inhabitants per square mile (283.0/km^{2}). There were 247 housing units at an average density of 304.8 per square mile (117.7/km^{2}). The racial makeup of the city was 95.45% White, 0.17% African American, 1.35% Native American, 0.17% Asian, 0.34% Pacific Islander, 1.85% from other races, and 0.67% from two or more races. Hispanic or Latino of any race were 2.19% of the population.

There were 231 households, out of which 31.2% had children under the age of 18 living with them, 65.8% were married couples living together, 8.7% had a female householder with no husband present, and 23.4% were non-families. 21.2% of all households were made up of individuals, and 12.1% had someone living alone who was 65 years of age or older. The average household size was 2.57 and the average family size was 2.94.

In the city, the population was spread out, with 26.1% under the age of 18, 6.1% from 18 to 24, 23.1% from 25 to 44, 27.6% from 45 to 64, and 17.2% who were 65 years of age or older. The median age was 42 years. For every 100 females, there were 89.2 males. For every 100 females age 18 and over, there were 88.4 males.

The median income for a household in the city was $38,542, and the median income for a family was $42,344. Males had a median income of $31,793 versus $24,063 for females. The per capita income for the city was $15,872. About 11.1% of families and 12.9% of the population were below the poverty line, including 16.3% of those under age 18 and 8.0% of those age 65 or over.

== Education ==
Cove is served by the Cove School District, which operates a K-12 public charter school called the Cove School. Cove High School participates in the 1A Old Oregon League in the OSAA.

Union County is not in the boundary of any community college district.

== Parks and recreation ==
Cove Hot Springs Pool is a natural warm-water swimming pool.

== Notable people ==
- Greg Barreto, former state representative
- Frank E. Childs, thoroughbred trainer in Racing Hall of Fame, born in Cove
- Lee Morse, torch singer of the 1920s and '30s, born in Cove
- Dean Smith, pioneer airmail pilot
