= Wallowa High School =

Public school in Wallowa, Oregon, United States

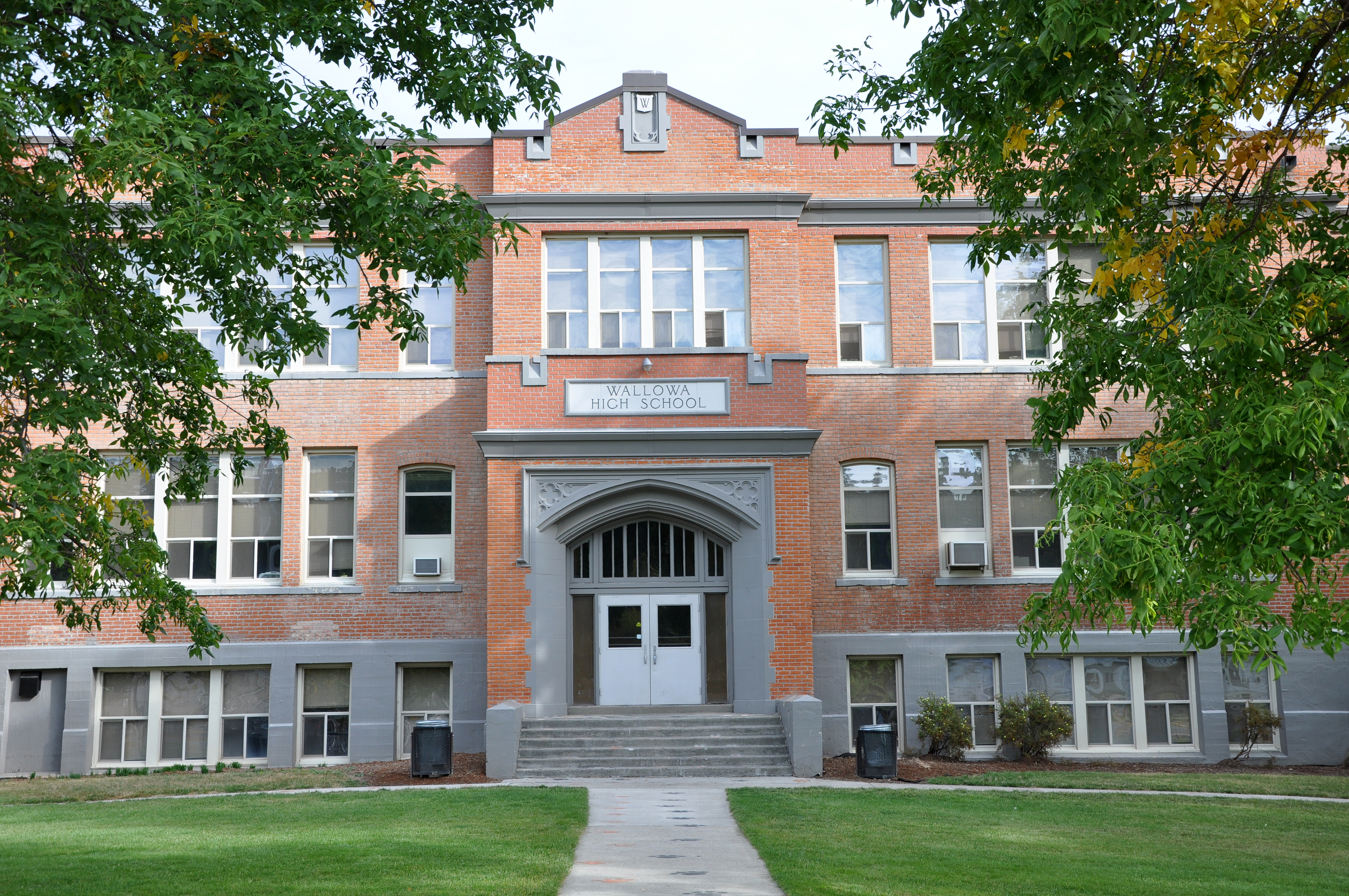

Location
- 315 First Street; Wallowa, (Wallowa County), Oregon 97885; United States; 45.570527°N 117.531883°W

Information
- Type: Public
- School district: Wallowa School District
- Principal: Rebecca Nordtvedt
- Grades: 7-12
- Enrollment: 65 (2023-2024)
- Colors: Orange and black
- Athletics conference: OSAA Old Oregon League 1A-7
- Mascot: Cougar
- Rival: Powder Valley and Joseph
- Website: www.wallowa.k12.or.us

Wallowa High School is a public high school in Wallowa, Oregon, United States.

== Academics ==
In 2008, 100% of the school's seniors received a high school diploma. Of 20 students, 20 graduated and none dropped out.

== Notable alumni ==
- Amos Marsh, football player with the Dallas Cowboys
- Frank Wayne Marsh, football player with the San Diego Chargers

== See also ==
- List of high schools in Oregon
