= Cove School (Oregon) =

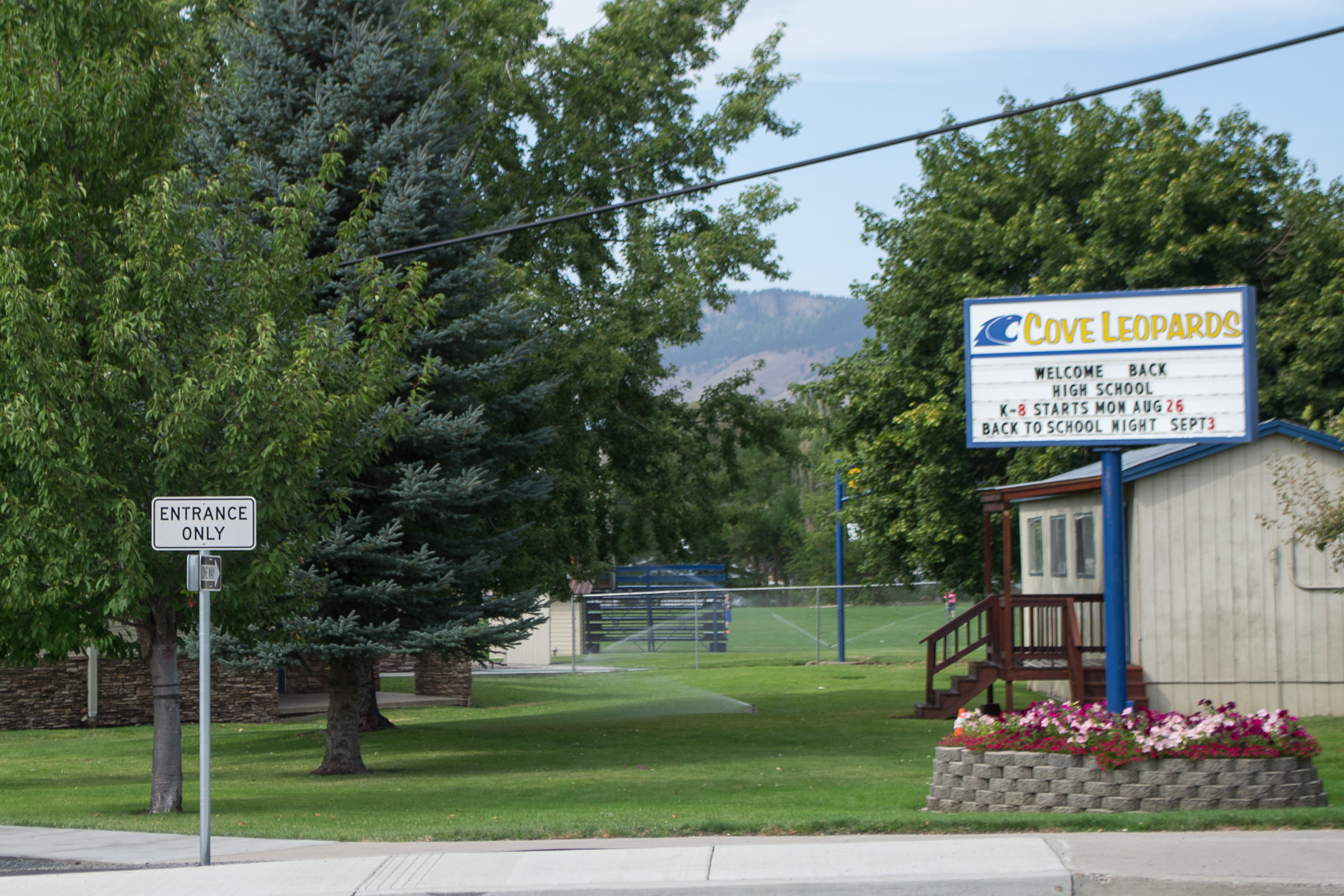

Location
- 803 Main Street; Cove, Union County, Oregon 97824; United States; 45.297217°N 117.809706°W

Information
- Type: Public
- School district: Cove School District
- Superintendent: Earl Pettit
- Principal: Dustin Clark
- Grades: K-12
- Enrollment: 252
- Colors: Blue and gold
- Athletics conference: OSAA Old Oregon 1A-7
- Mascot: Leopards
- Rival: Union Bobcats
- Website: www.cove.k12.or.us

Cove School is a public charter school in Cove, Oregon, United States. It is operated by Cove School District 15.

== Academics ==
Separated by only nine miles, this 1908 postcard shows Cove High School and Union High School playing football.

In 2008, 93% of the school's seniors received their high school diploma. Of 15 students, 14 graduated and 1 dropped out.
