= Telocaset, Oregon =

Unincorporated community in the state of Oregon, United States

Coordinates: 45°06′04″N 117°49′35″W

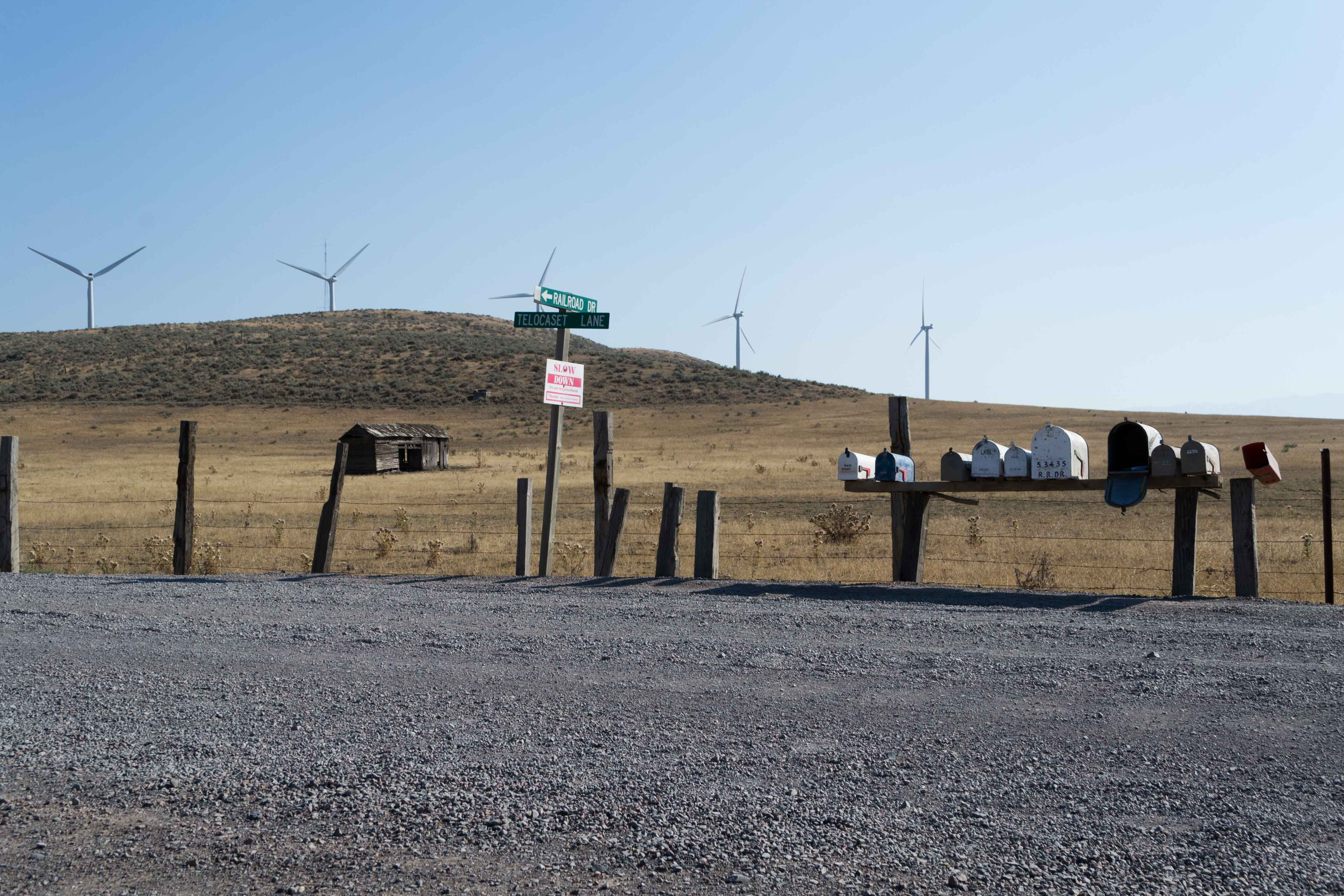
A wind farm and mailboxes across a gravel road in Telocaset

Telocaset /tɛloʊkæsɛt/ is an unincorporated community in Union County, Oregon, United States. It was a stagecoach station whose name comes from the Nez Perce word meaning "a thing at the top" or "put on top". The Nez Perce pronounced the word taule-karset.

Beginning in 1885, it was a station on the Oregon Railway and Navigation Company line; today the line is owned by Union Pacific. Telocaset was never platted, but it had a post office that ran from 1885 until 1975.
