= Dean Smith (pilot) =

American pilot

Dean Smith DFC
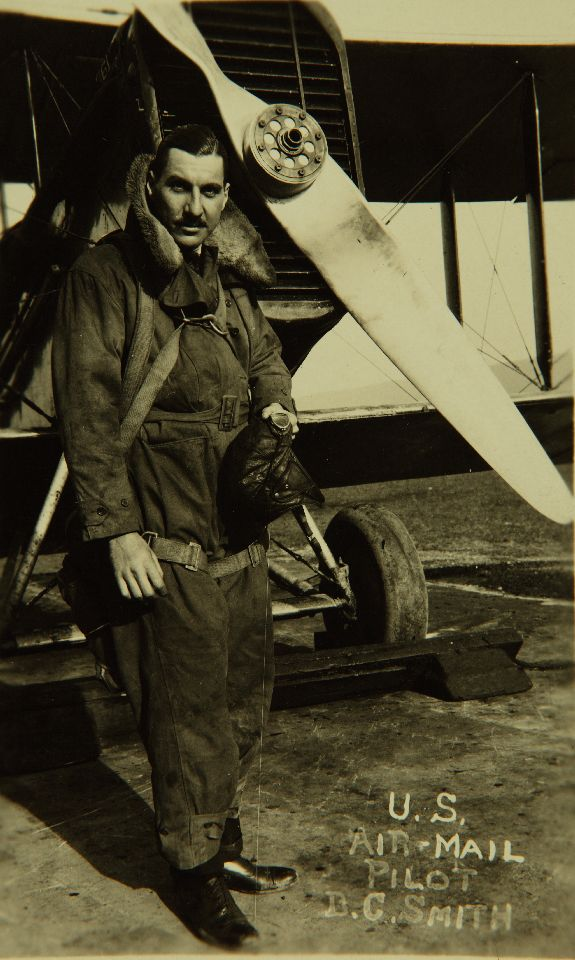
- Smith c. 1924
- Born: Dean Cullen Smith; September 27, 1899; Cove, Oregon, U.S.
- Died: March 4, 1987 (aged 87); Maryland, U.S.
- Other name: The Dean
- Occupation: Pilot
- Employers: United States Army; United States Postal Service
- Known for: Byrd expedition
- Height: 6 ft 3 in (1.91 m)

Dean Cullen Smith (September 27, 1899 – March 4, 1987) was a pioneer American mail pilot, test pilot, flying instructor, Antarctic pilot, and airline pilot. At 17 years of age, he became the youngest flight instructor in U.S. Army history. He was a lead pilot for the U.S. Postal Service's airmail service, and was the first pilot to initiate night air mail flights. He was an executive for many airlines and aircraft companies.

Smith was a pilot for the Byrd Antarctic Expedition of 1928–1930 involved in aerial overflights to discover new land that could be claimed for the benefit of the United States. The land was later viewed by Byrd and named after his wife. Smith was awarded the Distinguished Flying Cross and the Congressional Gold Medal. An Antarctic peak bears his name. He was inducted into the New Jersey Aviation Hall of Fame in 1986.

== Early life and education ==
Smith was born in Cove, Oregon, on September 27, 1899 at his grandparents home. His parents were Joshua Cullow Smith and Rhoda Harris Smith. When he was three years old he traveled with his family to Central America where his father's business was headquartered. He would often run away from home to go to his grandmother's to hear her talk about the pioneer days of covered-wagons. As a child, Smith attended public schools in Oregon. After high school he attended two years at Principia College in St. Louis, Missouri, but did not graduate.

== Mid life and career ==
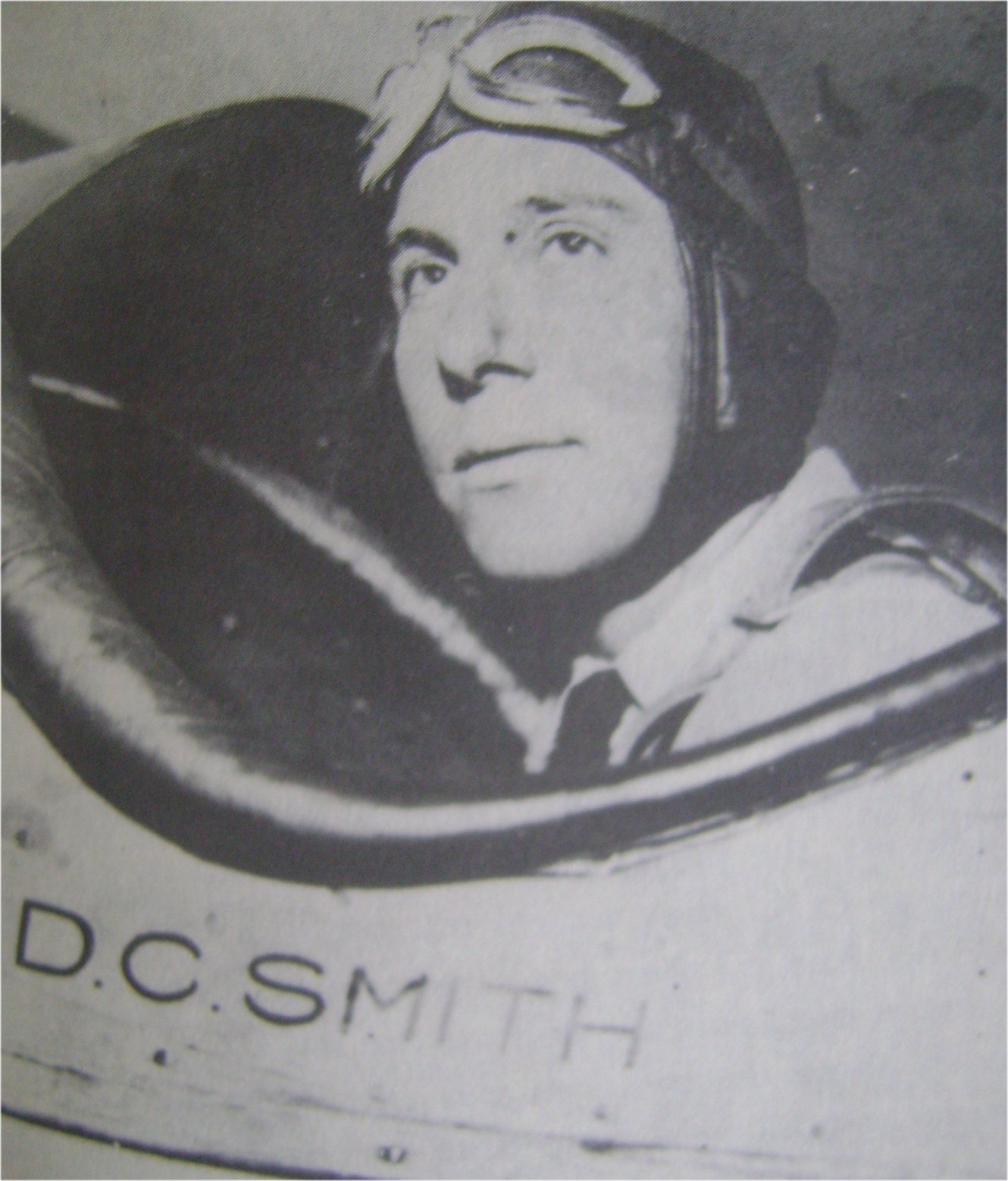
Dean Smith, airmail pilot in 1922

Smith enlisted in the aviation Section of the United States Signal Corps in July 1917, several months before his eighteenth birthday. Soon after he enlisted, he was promoted to master signal electrician, the highest non-commissioned rank of the US Army Signal Corps. During this time, he was the youngest enlist to serve in the capacity. In this position he was able to promote himself to be a cadet in Ground (Note: "After 56 hours and 45 minutes of flying instruction at Kelly Field, Texas, Smith was commissioned as a second lieutenant but did not go overseas in World War I. He showed so much promise as a flight instructor — at 17 the youngest in U.S. Army history — that he was retained for the duration training for flying service.")

At 17, Smith became the youngest ever flight instructor in U.S. Army history after receiving just under 57 hours of flying instruction. Though he volunteered to serve overseas to the front lines with the American Expeditionary Forces, he was posted as a flying instructor at Fort Scott. He was promoted to second lieutenant and stayed in the United States for the duration of his service duties.

From August 1918 to January 1919, Smith was assigned to Gosport Instructor's School in San Antonio, Texas, as an Army flight instructor. Later he was then transferred to Rockwell Field in San Diego to teach at the Pursuit School of Instruction, where he remained until he was discharged in March 1919. Subsequently, Smith flew as a barnstormer for about a year at carnivals. He also gave five-minute rides, for five dollars each, at county fairs in various states during this time. Eventually he destroyed his plane and discontinued these ventures.

Smith was instrumental in the inauguration of the air mail service by the United States Postal Service (USPS) in the summer of 1919. He had logged 900 hours of flying time in the Army before he joined the U.S. Mail Service at age nineteen. His first assignment was to fly mail from Omaha, Nebraska, to California, essentially following the same route as the Oregon Trail. His mother had taken this trail by covered wagon from Council Bluffs, Iowa, to Cove, Oregon, in 1871. His mother and grandparents had taken two years to complete their trip, whereas Smith flew his route to California within a week with several stops along the way.

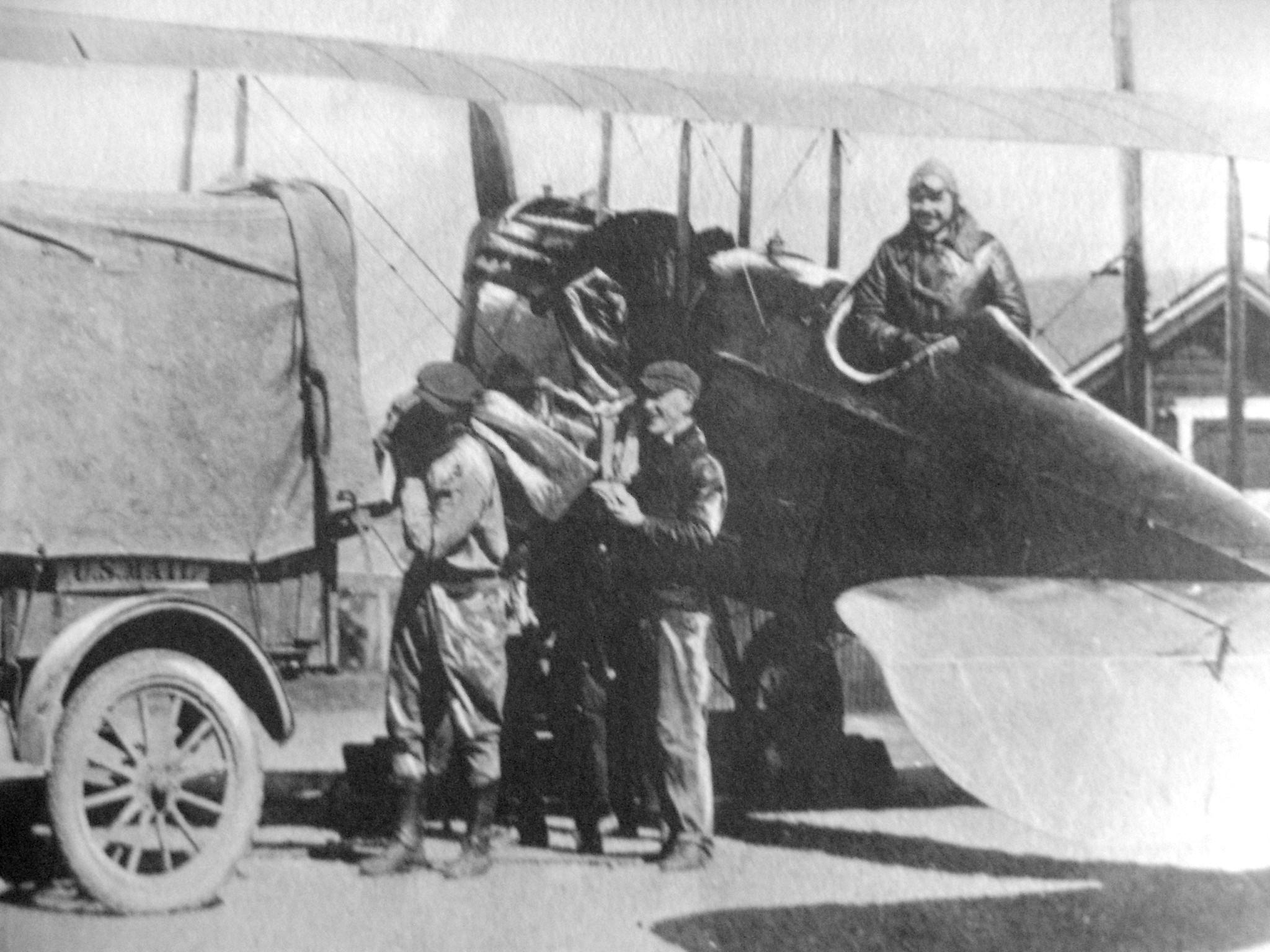
Smith delivering mail, Bellefonte Station

He became an official air mail pilot on May 21, 1920. He helped to develop a transcontinental route that included the technology of flying using electronic instruments. The next segment he added later was from Cleveland to Chicago and that leg was later extended to Omaha.

Flying planes carrying air mail, day or night, was hazardous and accidents happened often, more so even than in barnstorming. Smith worked as an air mail pilot until August 31, 1927. In his association with USPS for more than 7 years, he logged 3764.57 hours and flew 365,719 miles (588,568 km). Smith was permanently stationed at Bellefonte, Pennsylvania, as an air mail pilot starting in May 1920. He often flew from there in and out of Cleveland and used the De Havilland Airco DH-4B aircraft for the delivery of airmail.

"On Trip 4 westbound. Flying low. Engine quit. Only place to land on cow. Killed cow. Wrecked plane. Scared me. Smith." – Telegram

—

Smith reported in his autobiography, during one run from Omaha to Cheyenne, that he had had to ditch into a pasture, landing on a cow. He sent a laconic telegram to his division supervisor at headquarters in College Park, Maryland, reporting the mishap. Crashes were part of the job. Engines were unreliable, and pilots were using road maps. Unpredictable, bad weather was a constant risk. In the first five years of US Post Office air mail service the average forced landing was every 800 miles and a pilot was killed about every 80,000 miles. Thirty-five pilots died during the Postal Service's operation of air mail flights; most deaths were between 1920 and 1925.

Smith was involved in another incident that scared him to death. One day when he was flying his normal air mail route from Hadley Field to Cleveland, he caught something out of the corner of his eye that looked like a skyscraper. He pulled back on the control stick to quickly gain altitude and just missed hitting the U.S. Navy airship USS Los Angeles that was in his direct path. It was a close call of just over a hundred feet.

== Byrd expedition ==
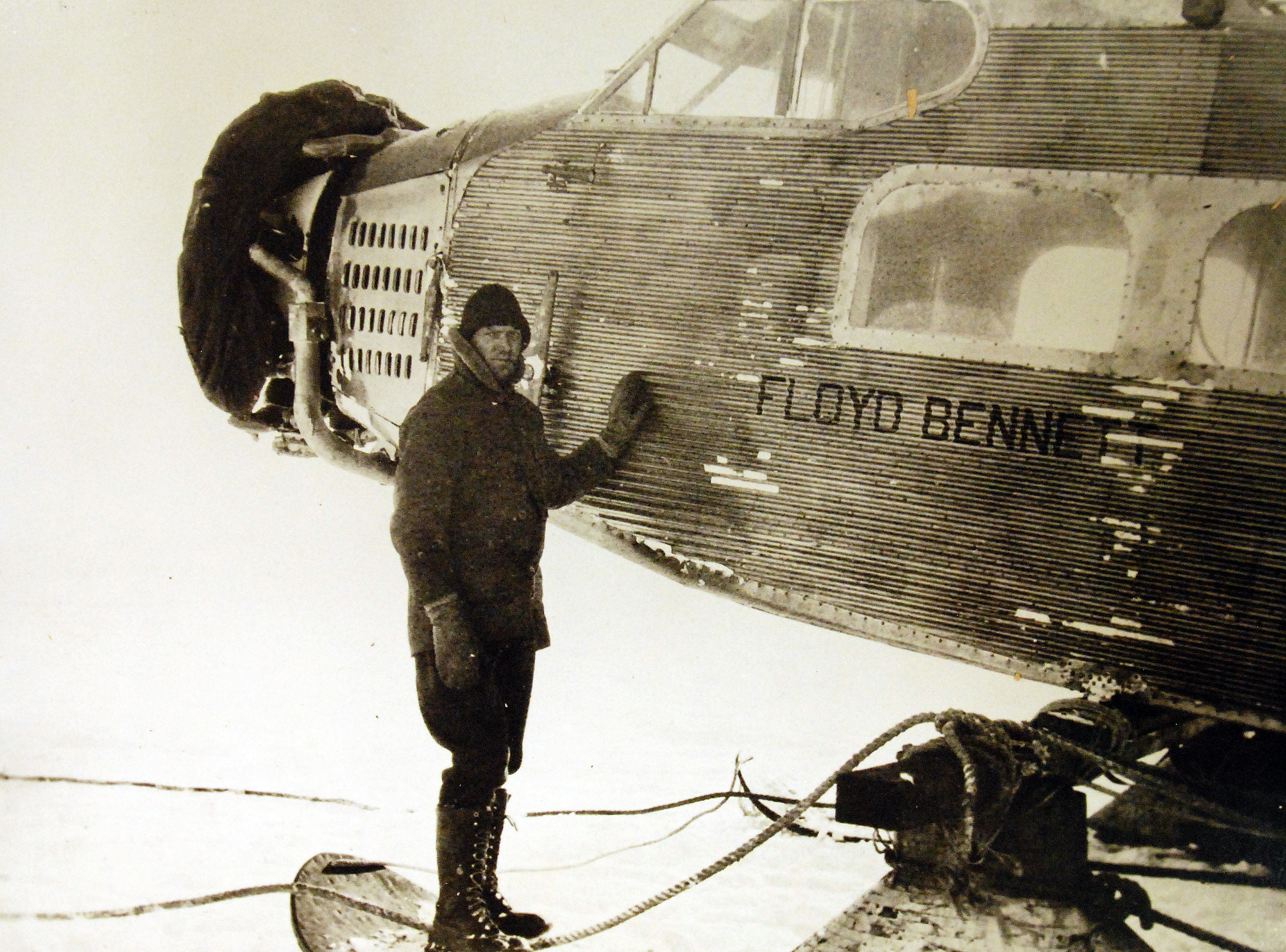
Engineer Elbert J. Thawley standing beside the "Floyd Bennett" airplane

In 1928, Smith was selected as a pilot for the Byrd Antarctic Expedition of 1928–1930 from a list of over 25,000 pilots. Byrd selected Smith not only for his all-weather experience, but because of the respect he had for Smith's mother after meeting her. Smith flew a three-engined Ford Trimotor plane named the Floyd Bennett (named in Bennett's honor) and headed for the South Pole on August 25, 1928. He logged 70 hours of Antarctic flying during the time he was at the South Pole with Admiral Richard Byrd.

Smith flew Antarctic missions with Bernt Balchen, a Norwegian, who piloted the first plane to traverse the South Pole. He was a pilot involved in aerial overflights to discover new land in Antarctica that had not been claimed by other countries. One was a Matterhorn-like mountain, and surrounding region which was named Marie Byrd Land in honor of Byrd's wife. The mountain range was seen first by Smith before Byrd saw it. Byrd claimed his "pet mountain" for the United States and a narrative of Byrd's story, and how the land got his wife's name, was published in The New York Times of February 21, 1929.

Smith returned from the expedition to his home town in Oregon for a festive welcome on July 21, 1930. Among the many questions the crowd had for him, the one that stood out was a question about the most impressive thing he experienced while at the South Pole. His answer was of the notable silence in the Antarctic. He accounted for this by remarking that no woman had ever been there. Smith went back to the air mail delivery after being at the South Pole for two years with Byrd, even setting a record on the notorious "hell stretch" over mountains in Pennsylvania.

== Later life and death ==
Throughout his career in aviation, Smith worked for various companies such as Learning Curtiss Company, Fairchild Aviation, Hughes Tool Company, Douglas Aircraft Company, American Airlines, and United Airlines at one time or another, in various capacities. He died in Maryland on March 4, 1987.

Though he stopped flying commercially in 1943, Smith continued his work with the aircraft and aviation industry. In 1973, he returned to New Zealand after more than 40 years as a guest for Air New Zealand on its first flight of McDonnell Douglas DC-10, this time as a passenger. He also was on board for a landing on the Tasman Glacier, passing through Milford Sound and Mount Cook, New Zealand.

== Personal traits ==
Smith was nicknamed "The Dean" because of his given name. As an adult he was 6 feet 3 inches tall, weighed 180 pounds, and had black hair. He was known as a man of few words. Some claimed his extreme shyness was unexpected, given his large size. Smith married Mrs. Elizabeth Schuyler on January 3, 1931.

== Societies ==
Smith was a member of the Aero Club of America. He was also a member of several pioneer aviator groups including the Air Mail Pioneers Association and the Quiet Birdmen. He was the last president of the National Air Pilots Association, as it was subsumed in 1932 into the Airline Pilots Association. As a pioneer flier, he was named to the Curtiss OX5 and Aviation Halls of Fame.

== Awards and legacy ==
Smith was decorated in 1930 with the Distinguished Flying Cross for assisting Byrd. He received the Harmon Trophy in 1934 for being America's most outstanding aviator. Smith was also a recipient of The Detroit News Aerial Trophy. He was a featured aviator in Chasing the Sun, a public television documentary on commercial aviation, produced by KCET Hollywood. Smith Peak on Thurston Island, Antarctica, is named for Smith.

== Published works ==
- Smith, Dean C. (1961). By The Seat of My Pants: A Pilot's Progress From 1917 to 1930 (1st ed.). Little, Brown. ASIN B0007DQ824.

== See also ==
- Hadley Field
