= Chuck Norris (politician) =

American politician (1925–2009)

Member of the Oregon House of Representatives from the 57th district
- In office 1987–1997
- Succeeded by: Bob Jenson

Personal details
- Born: Charles Reed Norris; April 15, 1925 Pasadena, California, U.S.
- Died: July 20, 2009 (aged 84) West Palm Beach, Florida, U.S.
- Party: Republican
- Spouse: Betty Lou Norris
- Children: 4

Military service
- Branch/service: United States Army
- Years of service: 1943–1971

Charles Reed Norris (April 15, 1925 – July 20, 2009) was an American politician, businessman, and military officer who served as a member of the Oregon House of Representatives.

== Early life ==
Norris was born in Pasadena, California and was raised in Americus, Kansas, where he attended high school. He served in the United States Army from 1943 to 1971. At the time of his retirement as a colonel, Norris was Commander of the Umatilla Army Depot in Hermiston, Oregon.

== Career ==
Upon his retirement from the military, Norris worked as a realtor and business executive. He served in the Oregon House of Representatives for the 57th District as a Republican from 1987 to 1997, residing in Hermiston. During his tenure, Norris played a role in securing funding for the Oregon National Guard Armory. In the House, he also served as a member of the Water Policy Committee.

== Personal life ==
He was married to Betty Lou Norris and had four children. In 2002, Norris and his wife retired and moved from Hermiston to Royal Palm Beach, Florida. He died in 2009 in West Palm Beach, Florida. He is a member of the Oregon State University College of Agriculture Sciences Hall of Fame.
