= Orodell, Oregon =

Unincorporated community in the state of Oregon, United States

Coordinates: 45.342910°N 118.113553°W

Orodell, also known as Oro Dell, is an unincorporated historic community in Union County, Oregon, United States, on the Grande Ronde River at the northwest edge of La Grande. It is considered a ghost town. Either Charles Fox or Stephen Coffin started the first sawmill in the Grande Ronde Valley there in the summer of 1862, after a joint-stock company between Coffin and other local settlers failed to materialize in 1861.

A townsite was platted in 1868. Orodell post office was established in 1867 and named by taking part of the Greek word oros, meaning "a mountain", and combining it with the English word "dell". The post office closed in 1878, and although the place is still known as Orodell, there has not been a community there for many years.
