= Alicel, Oregon =

Unincorporated community in the state of Oregon, United States

Coordinates: 45°24′15″N 117°58′48″W

Alicel is an unincorporated community in the Sand Ridge area of the Grande Ronde Valley in Union County, Oregon, United States. It is northeast of La Grande on Oregon Route 82. It was a station on Union Pacific Railroad's Joseph branch, and in 1890 was named for Alice Ladd, wife of local resident Charles Ladd. Alicel was platted in 1890, and had a post office from 1890 until 1972.

At the turn of the 20th century, Alicel had a general store, a school, and two warehouses. In 1902, Alicel was described as having a "thriving community" of Mormons. In 1940, Alicel had a population of 300. The Peacock Lumber Company sawmill in Alicel closed in 1994. It was slated to reopen in 1997, but was closed for good by 2000.

An agricultural community, Alicel is the site of a Pendleton Grain Growers grain elevator, which was the subject of a 1941 Minor White photograph.
