= Pearl Alice Marsh =

Pearl Alice Marsh worked as Senior Professional Staff for Africa on the House Committee on Foreign Affairs. She was the first African-American woman to receive a doctorate degree in Political Science from the University of California, Berkeley. She served as Director of U.S. Policy and Global Health at the ONE Campaign.
