= Bobby Levy =

American politician

Member of the Oregon House of Representatives from the 58th district
- Incumbent
- Assumed office January 11, 2021
- Preceded by: Greg Barreto

Personal details
- Born: La Grande, Oregon, U.S.
- Party: Republican
- Education: Portland State University (MBA); Eastern Oregon University (MEd)

Bobby Levy is an American politician serving as a Republican member of the Oregon House of Representatives.

On December 11, 2020, Levy and 11 other state Republican officials signed a letter requesting Oregon Attorney General Ellen Rosenblum join Texas and other states contesting the results of the 2020 presidential election in Texas v. Pennsylvania. Rosenblum announced she had filed in behalf of the defense, and against Texas, the day prior.

Levy was re-elected in 2022 with 82 percent of the vote, defeating Libertarian challenger Jesse Bonifer.

== Personal life ==
Levy was born in La Grande, Oregon, in Union County, but has lived most of her life in Umatilla County, Oregon.

== Political positions ==
Following the Standoff at Eagle Pass, Levy signed a letter in support of Texas Governor Greg Abbott's decision in the conflict.

== Electoral history ==
2020 Oregon State Representative, 58th district
Party	Candidate	Votes	%
Republican	Bobby Levy	24,846	72.8
Democratic	Nolan E Bylenga	9,230	27.0
Write-in		57	0.2
Total votes		34,133	100%

2022 Oregon State Representative, 58th district
Party	Candidate	Votes	%
Republican	Bobby Levy	23,274	83.7
Libertarian	Jesse Bonifer	4,226	15.2
Write-in		319	1.1
Total votes		27,819	100%

2024 Oregon State Representative, 58th district
Party	Candidate	Votes	%
Republican	Bobby Levy	26,477	98.2
Write-in		476	1.8
Total votes		26,953	100%
