= Union High School (Oregon) =

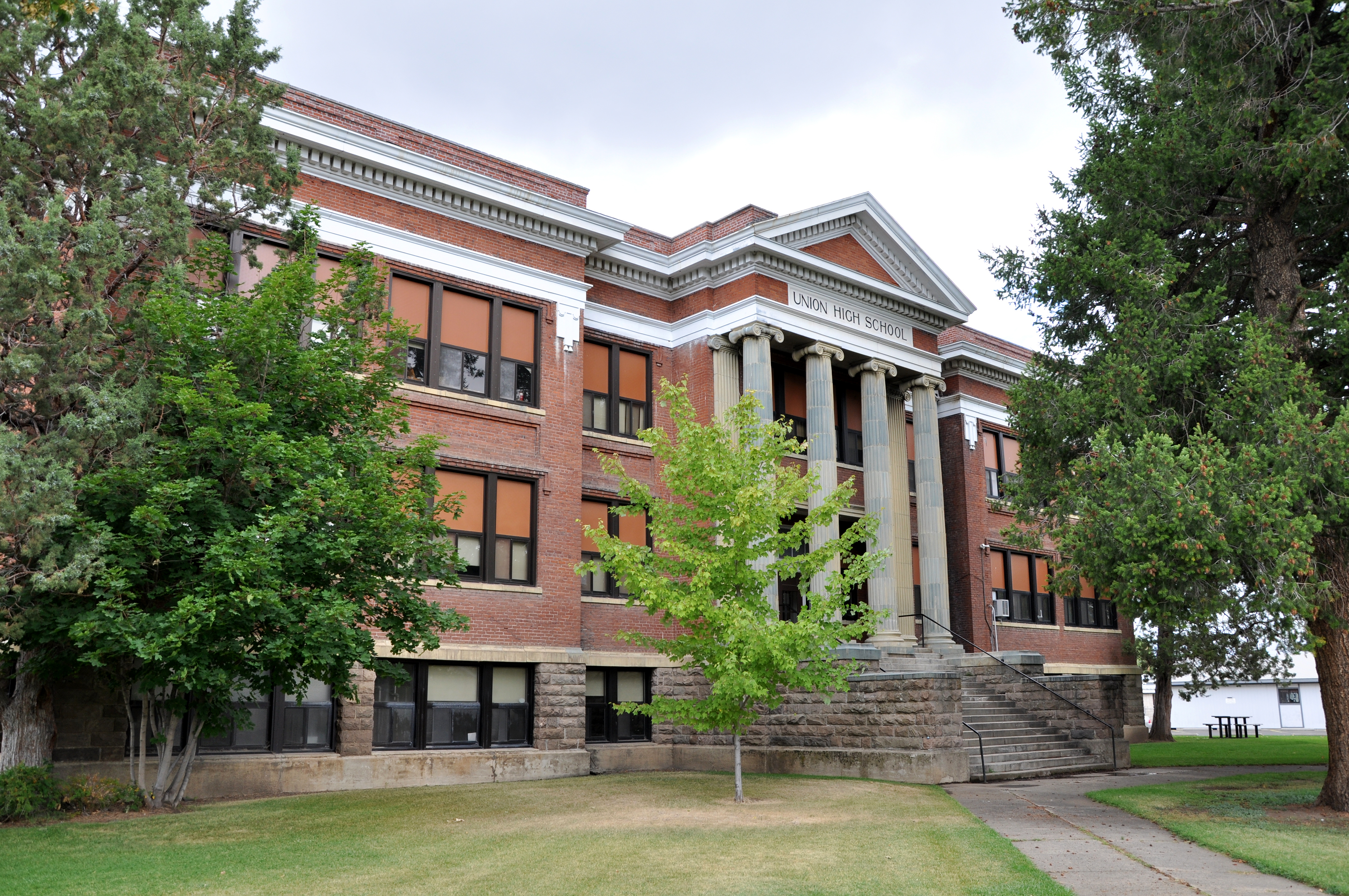

Location
- 540 S Main Street; Union, (Union County), Oregon 97883; United States; 45.206111°N 117.866111°W

Information
- School district: Union School District
- Principal: Carter Wells
- Staff: 9.68 (FTE)
- Grades: 7-12
- Enrollment: 166 (2024-2025)
- Student to teacher ratio: 17.15
- Colors: Red and white
- Athletics conference: OSAA
- Team name: Bobcats
- Website: www.union.k12.or.us

Union High School is a public high school in Union, Oregon, United States.

== Academics ==
In 2008, 97% of the school's seniors received their high school diploma. Of 36 students, 35 graduated, none dropped out, and one was still in high school the following year.
