= Frank Wayne Marsh =

American football player (born 1940)

Frank Marsh
No. 36
- Position: Defensive back

Personal information
- Born: June 19, 1940 (age 86); La Grande, Oregon, U.S.
- Listed height: 6 ft 2 in (1.88 m)
- Listed weight: 205 lb (93 kg)

Career information
- High school: Wallowa (OR)
- College: Oregon State
- NFL draft: 1963: undrafted

Career history
- Dallas Cowboys (1963)*; Detroit Lions (1966)*; San Diego Chargers (1967); Cincinnati Bengals (1968)
- * Offseason or practice squad member only

Career AFL statistics
- Games played: 1
- Stats at Pro Football Reference

Frank Wayne Marsh (born June 19, 1940), is an American former professional football player who was a defensive back for the San Diego Chargers of the American Football League (AFL). He played college football for the Oregon State Beavers. He also competed in track at Oregon State University.

== Early life ==
Born in La Grande, Oregon, Marsh attended Wallowa High School, where he practiced track and football. He played as a halfback in football.

He accepted a track scholarship from Oregon State University, where he ran in the sprint medley relay and the high hurdles.

== Professional career ==
=== Dallas Cowboys ===
On June 27, 1963, he was signed as an undrafted free agent by the Dallas Cowboys to be tried at offensive end, although he didn't play college football. He was released before the season started on July 18.

=== Detroit Lions ===
In 1966, he was signed as a free agent by the Detroit Lions to play defensive back. He was cut on August 25 and later signed to the practice squad. He was released on September 5, 1967.

=== San Diego Chargers ===
In 1967, he was signed by the San Diego Chargers of the American Football League. He played as a defensive back.

=== Cincinnati Bengals ===
In the 1968 AFL expansion draft, he was left unprotected by the Chargers and was selected by the Cincinnati Bengals. At training camp he was also tried at running back. He was released on June 28, 1969.

== Personal life ==
His brother Amos Marsh played professional football for the Dallas Cowboys and Detroit Lions.
