= Cove Hot Springs Pool =

Pool in Oregon, United States

Coordinates: 45.2934520°N 117.8071570°W

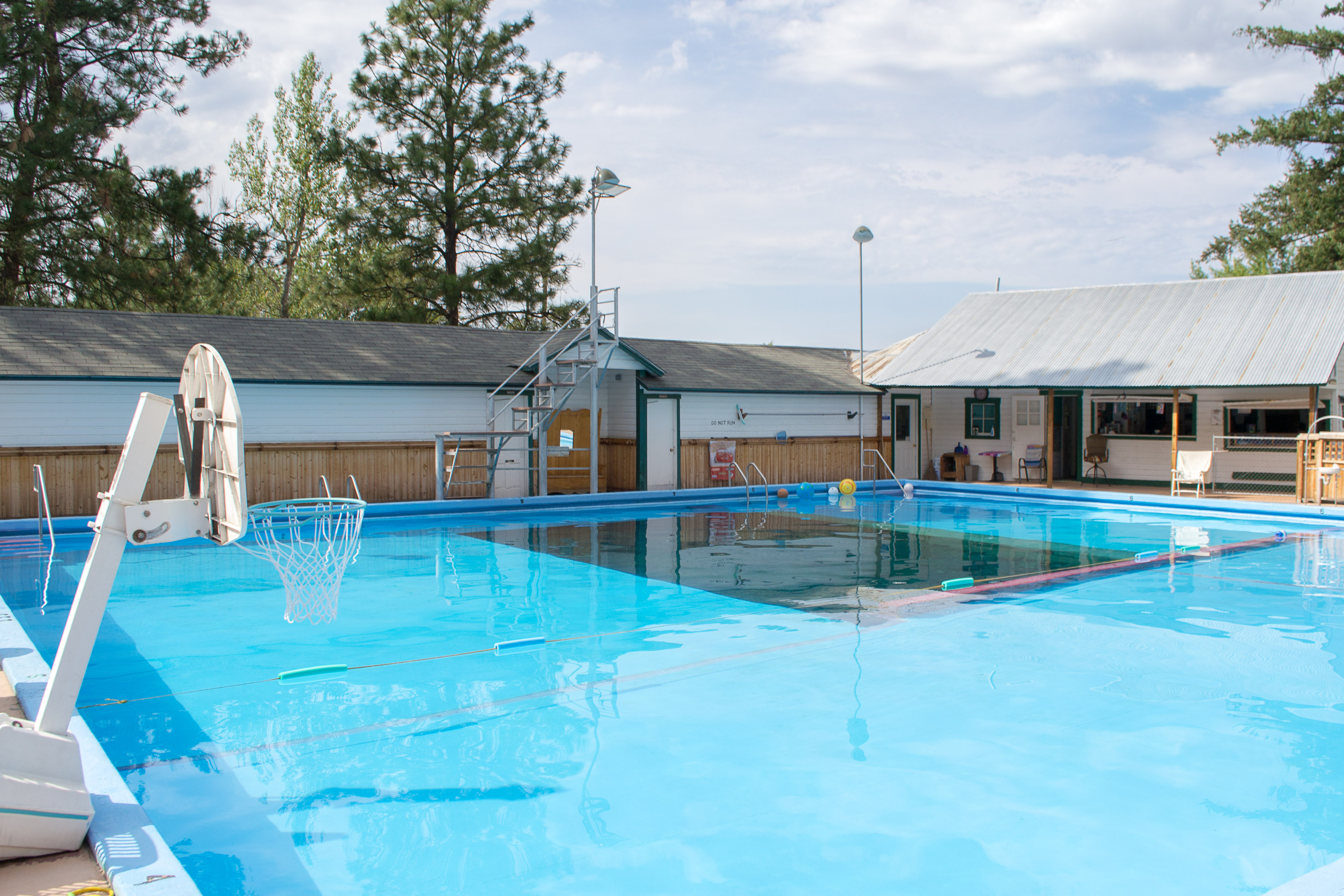
Cove Hot Springs Pool

Cove Hot Springs is a pool constructed over a natural hot spring in the Grande Ronde Valley of northeastern Oregon, U.S. The 86 °F (30 °C) water flows at 300 US gallons (1,100 L) per minute which replaces the 15-by-15-foot (4.6 by 4.6 m) pool several times per day.

The pool is located approximately 10 miles (16 km) east of La Grande and 7 miles (11 km) north-northeast of Union on the western edge of the Wallowa Mountains.
