= Union County, Oregon =

County in Oregon, United States

- County
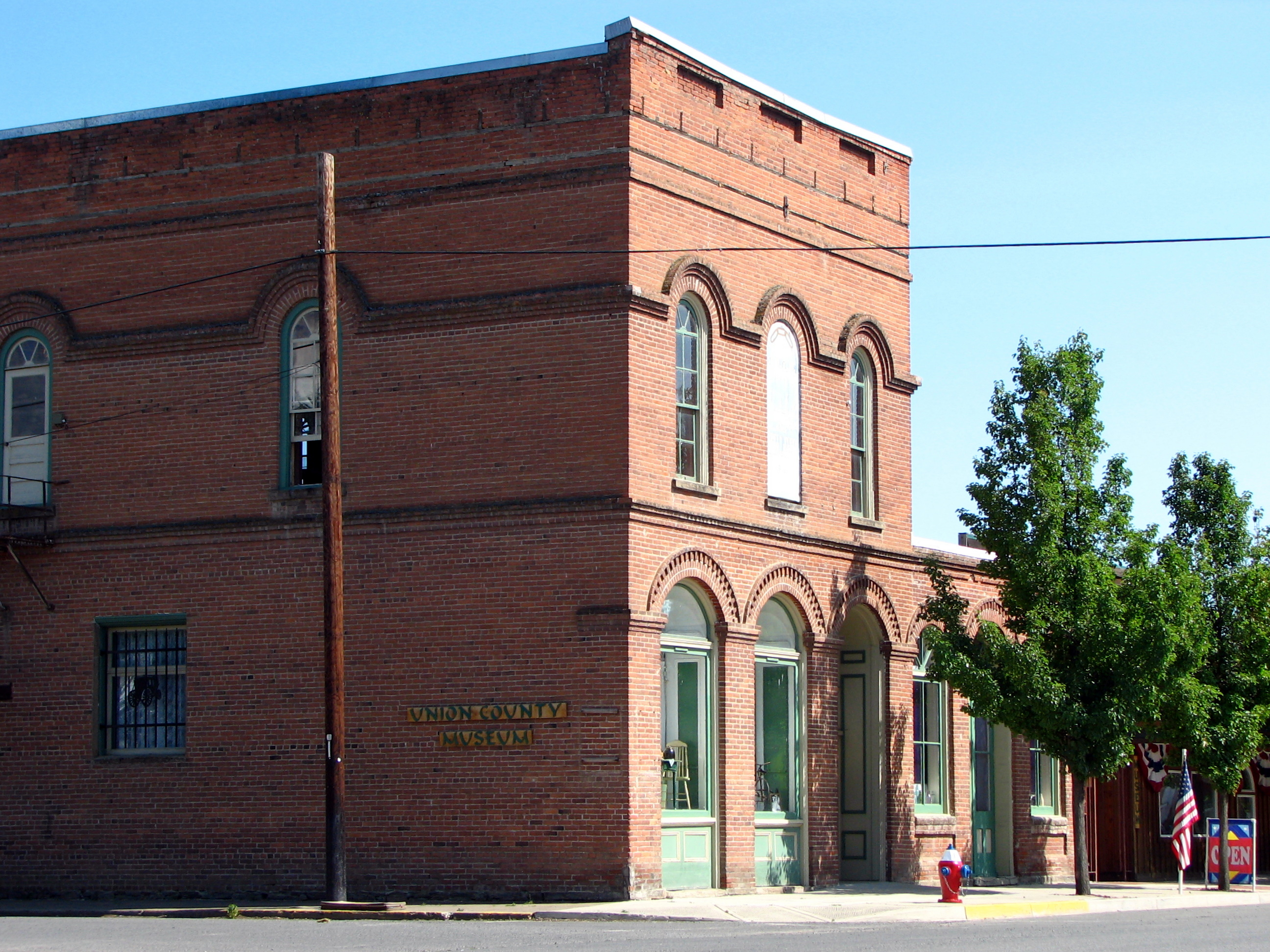
- Union County Museum

- Location within the U.S. state of Oregon
- Coordinates: 45°19′38″N 118°05′36″W
- Country: United States
- State: Oregon
- Founded: October 14, 1864
- Named for: Union, Oregon
- Seat: La Grande
- Largest city: La Grande

Area
  - Total: 2,039 sq mi (5,280 km^{2})
  - Land: 2,037 sq mi (5,280 km^{2})
  - Water: 1.9 sq mi (4.9 km^{2}) 0.1%

Population (2020)
  - Total: 26,196
  - Estimate (2025): 25,900 ▼
  - Density: 13/sq mi (5.0/km^{2})
- Time zone: UTC−8 (Pacific)
  - Summer (DST): UTC−7 (PDT)
- Congressional district: 2nd
- Website: unioncountyor.gov

Union County is one of the 36 counties in the U.S. state of Oregon, and one of the 8 counties of eastern Oregon. As of the 2020 census, the population was 26,196. The county comprises the La Grande micropolitan statistical area and the county seat is La Grande.

== History ==
According to Oregon Geographic Names, the county is named for the town of Union. Union County was originally part of Baker County (which was originally a part of Wasco County, which was originally part of Clackamas County). The northern end of the Grande Ronde Valley was the first part to be settled. During the 1860s, population growth in eastern Oregon prompted the State Legislature to split Umatilla and Baker Counties from Wasco County in 1862. Further settlement in the Grande Ronde Valley led to the division of Baker County to create Union County on October 14, 1864. The county doubled in population between 1880 and 1890.

The choice of a county seat resulted in competition, based on geography and on economic and population growth, between La Grande and the city of Union. The county seat alternated between Union and La Grande until it permanently came to rest at La Grande in 1905. Between 1875 and 1913, adjustments were made between Union County's borders and the borders of Baker, Umatilla, and Wallowa counties.

== Geography ==
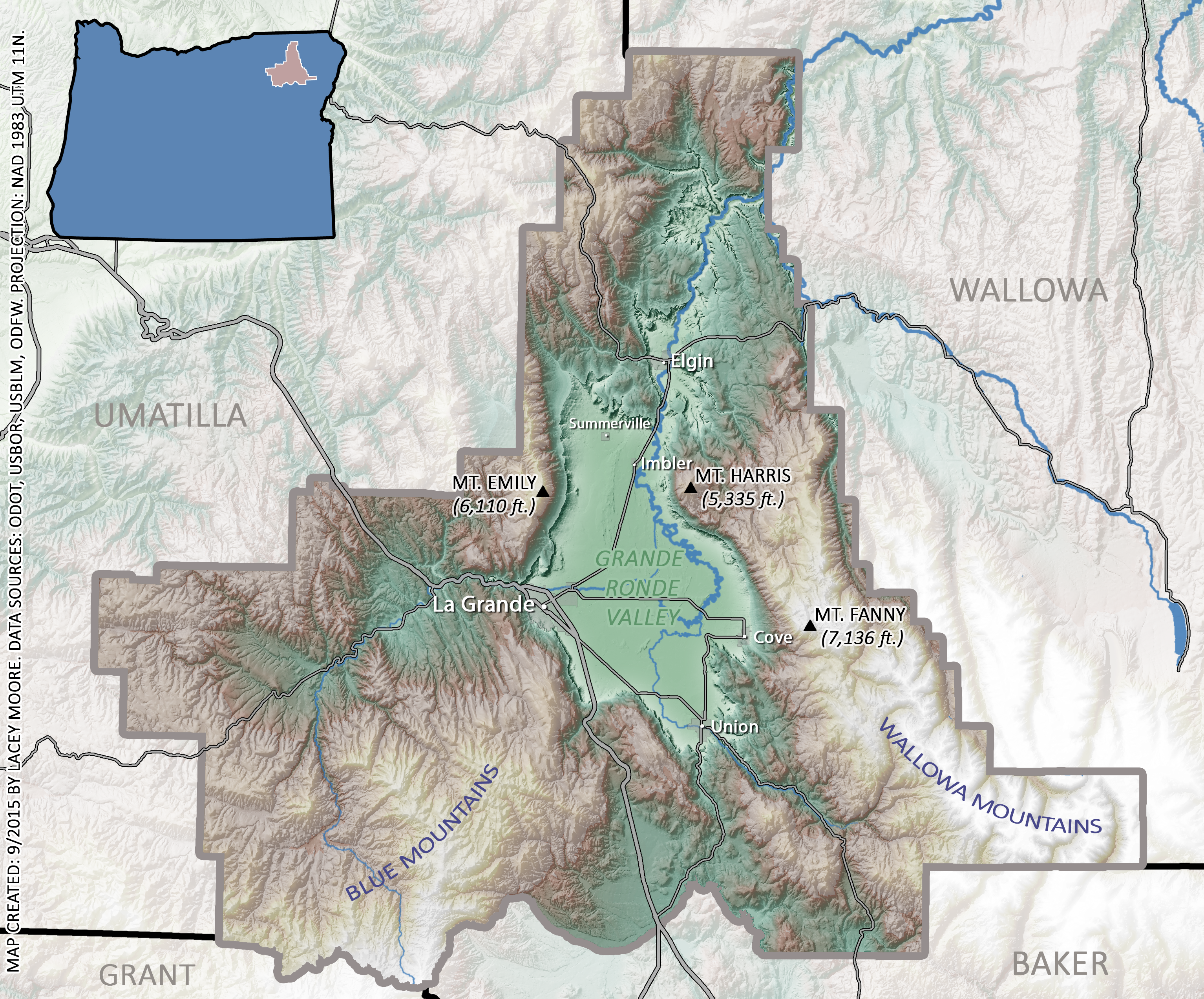
Union County

According to the United States Census Bureau, the county has a total area of 2,039 square miles (5,280 km^{2}), of which 2,037 square miles (5,280 km^{2}) is land and 1.9 square miles (4.9 km^{2}) (0.1%) is water. The Forest Service owns 47% of the land in the county.

=== Adjacent counties ===
- Umatilla County (northwest)
- Wallowa County (northeast)
- Baker County (southeast)
- Grant County (southwest)

== Demographics ==
Historical population
Census	Pop.	Note	%±
1870	2,552		—
1880	6,550		156.7%
1890	12,044		83.9%
1900	16,070		33.4%
1910	16,191		0.8%
1920	16,636		2.7%
1930	17,492		5.1%
1940	17,399		−0.5%
1950	17,962		3.2%
1960	18,180		1.2%
1970	19,377		6.6%
1980	23,921		23.5%
1990	23,598		−1.4%
2000	24,530		3.9%
2010	25,748		5.0%
2020	26,196		1.7%
2025 (est.)	25,900	▼	−1.1%
U.S. Decennial Census; 1790–1960 1900–1990; 1990–2000 2010–2020

=== 2020 census ===
As of the 2020 census, the county had a population of 26,196. Of the residents, 22.2% were under the age of 18 and 21.6% were 65 years of age or older; the median age was 40.1 years. For every 100 females there were 97.6 males, and for every 100 females age 18 and over there were 95.1 males. 57.1% of residents lived in urban areas and 42.9% lived in rural areas.

The racial and ethnic composition of the county is detailed in the table below.

There were 10,779 households in the county, of which 27.0% had children under the age of 18 living with them and 25.5% had a female householder with no spouse or partner present. About 28.8% of all households were made up of individuals and 13.5% had someone living alone who was 65 years of age or older.

There were 11,649 housing units, of which 7.5% were vacant. Among occupied housing units, 65.2% were owner-occupied and 34.8% were renter-occupied. The homeowner vacancy rate was 1.2% and the rental vacancy rate was 5.8%.

Union County, Oregon – Racial and ethnic composition Note: the US Census treats Hispanic/Latino as an ethnic category. This table excludes Latinos from the racial categories and assigns them to a separate category. Hispanics/Latinos may be of any race.
Race / Ethnicity (NH = Non-Hispanic)	Pop 1980	Pop 1990	Pop 2000	Pop 2010	Pop 2020	% 1980	% 1990	% 2000	% 2010	% 2020
White alone (NH)	23,170	22,612	22,843	23,407	22,075	96.86%	95.82%	93.12%	90.91%	84.27%
Black or African American alone (NH)	104	99	117	126	145	0.43%	0.42%	0.48%	0.49%	0.55%
Native American or Alaska Native alone (NH)	170	226	191	255	219	0.71%	0.96%	0.78%	0.99%	0.84%
Asian alone (NH)	106	268	204	204	216	0.44%	1.14%	0.83%	0.79%	0.82%
Native Hawaiian or Pacific Islander alone (NH)	x	x	147	223	488	x	x	0.60%	0.87%	1.86%
Other race alone (NH)	97	12	92	49	129	0.41%	0.05%	0.38%	0.19%	0.49%
Mixed race or Multiracial (NH)	x	x	336	482	1,577	x	x	1.37%	1.87%	6.02%
Hispanic or Latino (any race)	274	381	600	1,002	1,347	1.15%	1.61%	2.45%	3.89%	5.14%
Total	23,921	23,598	24,530	25,748	26,196	100.00%	100.00%	100.00%	100.00%	100.00%

=== 2010 census ===
As of the 2010 census, there were 25,748 people, 10,501 households, and 6,804 families living in the county. The population density was 12.6 inhabitants per square mile (4.9/km^{2}). There were 11,489 housing units at an average density of 5.6 units per square mile (2.2 units/km^{2}). The racial makeup of the county was 93.1% white, 1.1% American Indian, 0.9% Pacific islander, 0.8% Asian, 0.5% black or African American, 1.3% from other races, and 2.3% from two or more races. Those of Hispanic or Latino origin made up 3.9% of the population. In terms of ancestry, 25.2% were German, 17.8% were Irish, 17.3% were English, and 6.9% were American.

Of the 10,501 households, 28.2% had children under the age of 18 living with them, 51.3% were married couples living together, 9.5% had a female householder with no husband present, 35.2% were non-families, and 27.6% of all households were made up of individuals. The average household size was 2.38 and the average family size was 2.89. The median age was 40.0 years.

The median income for a household in the county was $42,162 and the median income for a family was $52,558. Males had a median income of $40,720 versus $30,373 for females. The per capita income for the county was $22,947. About 10.5% of families and 16.1% of the population were below the poverty line, including 22.6% of those under age 18 and 10.2% of those age 65 or over.

=== 2000 census ===
As of the 2000 census, there were 24,530 people, 9,740 households, and 6,516 families living in the county. The population density was 12 people per square mile (4.6 people/km^{2}). There were 10,603 housing units at an average density of 5 units per square mile (1.9/km^{2}). The racial makeup of the county was 94.29% White, 0.85% Native American, 0.85% Asian, 0.62% Pacific Islander, 0.51% Black/African American, 1.22% from other races, and 1.67% from two or more races. Hispanics and Latinos of any race constituted 2.45% of the population. 20.2% were of German, 15.5% American, 12.2% English and 10.5% Irish ancestry.

There were 9,740 households, out of which 30.00% had children under the age of 18 living with them, 55.10% were married couples living together, 8.50% had a female householder with no husband present, and 33.10% were non-families. 26.10% of all households were made up of individuals, and 10.80% had someone living alone who was 65 years of age or older. The average household size was 2.45 and the average family size was 2.94.

In the county, the population was spread out, with 24.60% under the age of 18, 12.10% from 18 to 24, 23.50% from 25 to 44, 25.00% from 45 to 64, and 14.70% who were 65 years of age or older. The median age was 38 years. For every 100 females there were 95.10 males. For every 100 females age 18 and over, there were 92.40 males.

The median income for a household in the county was $33,738, and the median income for a family was $40,520. Males had a median income of $33,028 versus $21,740 for females. The per capita income for the county was $16,907. About 8.50% of families and 13.80% of the population were below the poverty line, including 13.60% of those under age 18 and 9.50% of those age 65 or over.

== Communities ==
=== Cities ===
- Cove
- Elgin
- Imbler
- Island City
- La Grande (county seat)
- North Powder
- Summerville
- Union

=== Unincorporated communities ===
- Alicel
- Camp Elkanah
- Hilgard
- Hot Lake
- Kamela
- Medical Springs
- Perry
- Starkey
- Telocaset

=== Ghost towns/Former communities ===
- Nibley
- Orodell
- Pondosa

== Government and politics ==
Registered voters of 2009.

Like the rest of eastern Oregon, the majority of registered voters who are part of a political party in Union County belong to the Republican Party. In the 2016 presidential election, 65 percent of Union County voters voted for Republican Donald Trump, while 25 percent voted for Democrat Hillary Clinton and 10 percent of voters either voted for a Third Party candidate or wrote in a candidate. These numbers show a large shift away from the Democratic party towards third-party candidates when compared to the 2012 presidential election, when 63.2% of Union Country voters voted for Mitt Romney, 32.9% voted for Barack Obama, and 3.8% of voters either voted for a third party candidate or wrote in a candidate. In 2020, however, the third party turnout dropped to 2.62% and Joe Biden won 28.47% of the vote, but the Republican lean remained with Trump winning over 68% of the vote.

United States presidential election results for Union County, Oregon
Year	Republican		Democratic		Third party(ies)	
Year	No.	%	No.	%	No.	%
1904	1,884	62.88%	775	25.87%	337	11.25%
1908	1,510	50.67%	1,191	39.97%	279	9.36%
1912	671	21.41%	1,090	34.78%	1,373	43.81%
1916	2,253	39.77%	3,086	54.47%	326	5.75%
1920	2,844	56.65%	1,899	37.83%	277	5.52%
1924	2,428	42.87%	1,816	32.07%	1,419	25.06%
1928	3,219	59.13%	2,154	39.57%	71	1.30%
1932	1,705	26.85%	4,450	70.08%	195	3.07%
1936	1,517	22.60%	4,643	69.17%	552	8.22%
1940	2,642	36.71%	4,500	62.53%	54	0.75%
1944	2,413	37.56%	3,951	61.50%	60	0.93%
1948	2,668	39.83%	3,808	56.85%	222	3.31%
1952	4,114	53.69%	3,526	46.01%	23	0.30%
1956	3,749	46.07%	4,389	53.93%	0	0.00%
1960	3,689	47.48%	4,081	52.52%	0	0.00%
1964	2,553	34.09%	4,929	65.82%	7	0.09%
1968	3,796	49.00%	3,409	44.00%	542	7.00%
1972	5,073	56.46%	3,272	36.42%	640	7.12%
1976	5,111	52.00%	4,280	43.54%	438	4.46%
1980	6,514	57.79%	3,677	32.62%	1,081	9.59%
1984	6,645	61.36%	4,134	38.18%	50	0.46%
1988	5,061	50.16%	4,682	46.40%	347	3.44%
1992	4,223	36.44%	3,990	34.43%	3,375	29.12%
1996	5,414	47.72%	4,379	38.60%	1,552	13.68%
2000	7,836	64.89%	3,577	29.62%	663	5.49%
2004	8,879	65.68%	4,428	32.75%	212	1.57%
2008	7,581	60.20%	4,613	36.63%	400	3.18%
2012	7,636	63.26%	3,973	32.92%	461	3.82%
2016	8,431	65.01%	3,249	25.05%	1,288	9.93%
2020	10,298	68.91%	4,254	28.47%	392	2.62%
2024	9,942	68.22%	4,107	28.18%	525	3.60%

=== Oregon Legislative Assembly ===
Union County is located in Oregon State House District 58 which is currently represented by Bobby Levy. It is also located in Oregon State Senate District 29, represented by Todd Nash. Both Levy and Nash are registered Republicans.

=== Board of Commissioners ===
Union County is represented and governed by three commissioners. The Union County Board of Commissioners is currently made up of Paul Anderes, Matt Scarfo, and Jake Seavert.

== Economy ==
The initial economic interest in Union County was mining, but most of the mines in the area were annexed by Baker County in 1901. The local economy continues to be based on natural resources, including farming (wheat, fruit, vegetables, mint, and grass seed), ranching (cattle and sheep), and timber. The ridges of Pyles Canyon are the site of the Elkhorn Valley Wind Farm, owned and operated by Horizon Wind Energy and whose power is sold to Idaho Power. Since October 2010, the county board of commissioners has supported a "strategic investment program" for another wind power project in Oregon, Horizon Wind Energy's proposed Antelope Ridge Wind Farm; after delays due to concerns about the project's impact on wildlife, the project has received support from Oregon Department of Fish and Wildlife.

Nearby mountains and streams offer hunting, fishing, skiing, and camping, all of which attract vacationers. Attractions include the Anthony Lakes (and its ski area), Minam River, Mount Emily, Blue Mountains, Umatilla National Forest, Wallowa–Whitman National Forest (including Eagle Cap Wilderness), Catherine Creek State Park, Hilgard Junction State Recreation Area, Thief Valley Reservoir, Cove Hot Springs Pool, the Hot Lake Hotel (first built in the 1860s due to nearby hot springs), and the Eagle Cap Excursion Train.

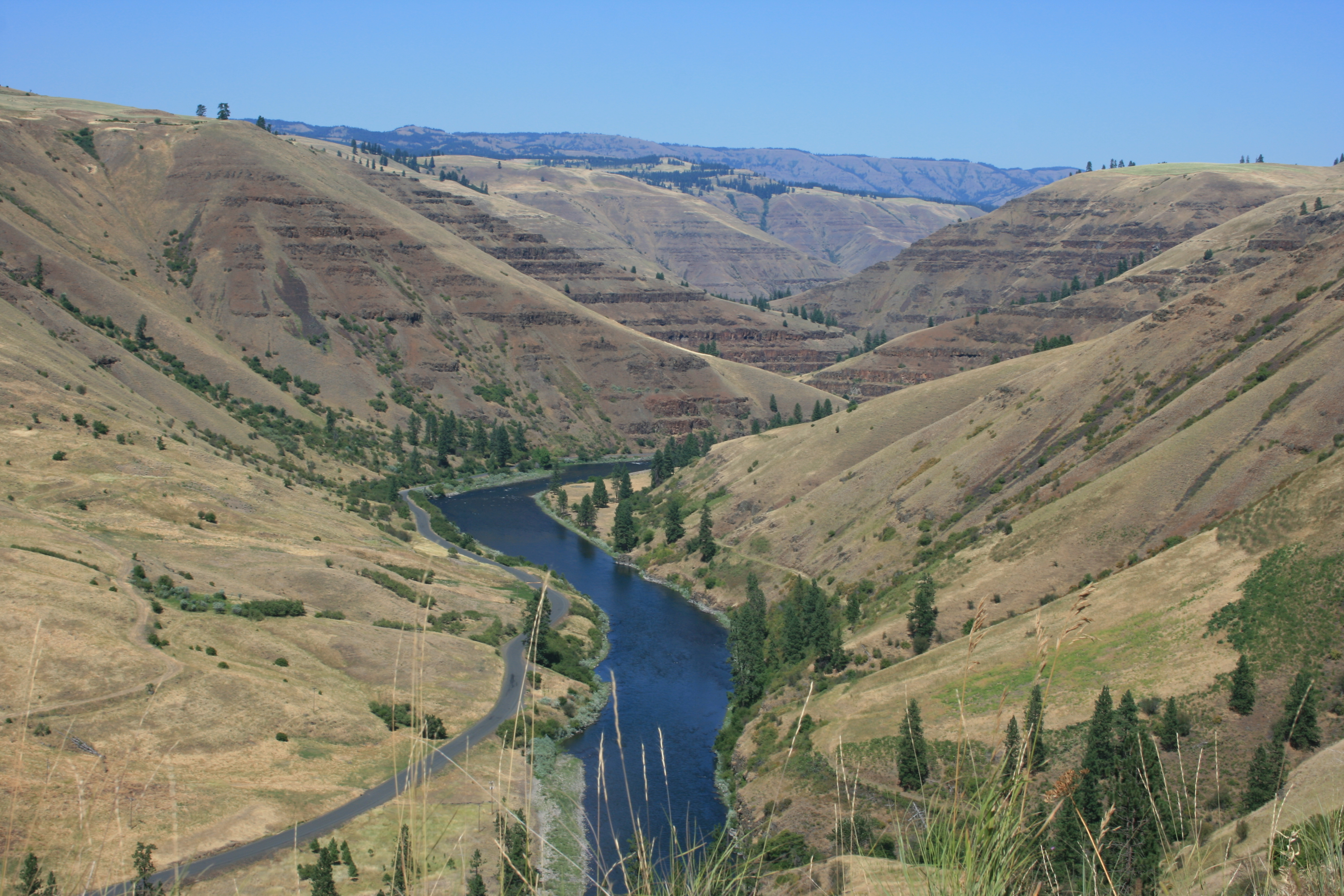
Basalt outcroppings along the Grande Ronde River (August 2011).

== Education ==
School districts include:

- Athena-Weston School District 29J
- Baker School District 5J
- Cove School District 15
- Elgin School District 23
- Imbler School District 11
- La Grande School District 1
- North Powder School District 8J
- Union School District 5

Union County is not in the boundary of any community college district.
