= Dean of the House =

The dean of the House is, in some legislatures, the member with the longest unbroken record of service. Specific examples include:

- Dean of the United States House of Representatives, currently Hal Rogers since 2022
- Dean of the House (Canada), currently Louis Plamondon since 2008

== See also ==
- Dean of the United States Senate
- Father of the House, the equivalent in other legislatures
- Father of the Dáil, the equivalent in Dáil Éireann
