= National Register of Historic Places listings in Union County, Oregon =

Location of Union County in Oregon

This list presents the full set of buildings, structures, objects, sites, or districts designated on the National Register of Historic Places in Union County, Oregon, United States, and offers brief descriptive information about each of them. The National Register recognizes places of national, state, or local historic significance across the United States. Out of over 90,000 National Register sites nationwide, Oregon is home to over 2,000, and 22 of those are found in Union County.

This National Park Service list is complete through NPS recent listings posted June 12, 2026.

== Current listings ==
	Name on the Register	Image	Date listed	Location	City or town	Description
1	Administration Building	Administration Building	February 27, 1980 (#80003384)	Eastern Oregon University campus 45°19′17″N 118°05′25″W	La Grande	
2	John Anthony House	John Anthony House	September 22, 1988 (#88001530)	1606 6th Street; 45°19′33″N 118°05′41″W	La Grande	
3	Anthony–Buckley House	Anthony–Buckley House	February 28, 1985 (#85000372)	1602 6th Street; 45°19′33″N 118°05′40″W	La Grande	
4	Ascension Episcopal Church and Rectory	Ascension Episcopal Church and Rectory	December 3, 1974 (#74001718)	Church Street; 45°17′52″N 117°48′47″W	Cove	
5	Dry Creek School	Dry Creek School	August 31, 2000 (#00001019)	69281 Summerville Road; 45°31′17″N 118°01′34″W	Summerville vicinity	
6	Abel E. Eaton House	Abel E. Eaton House	November 2, 1977 (#77001115)	464 N. Main Street; 45°12′42″N 117°51′57″W	Union	This fine French Second Empire house represents a style unusual in Eastern Oregon. It was built ca. 1900 (Note: Sources differ regarding the Eaton House's date of construction. Dates given include ca. 1898, 1904, and 1907.) for Abel Eaton, a prosperous businessman, civic leader, and mayor. It stands in the north Union neighborhood that was the town's upscale residential area during its period of rapid growth in the late 19th and early 20th centuries.
7	Elgin City Hall and Opera House	Elgin City Hall and Opera House	October 10, 1980 (#80003383)	100 N. 8th Street; 45°33′56″N 117°55′02″W	Elgin	
8	Foley Building	Foley Building	December 2, 1985 (#85003080)	206 Chestnut Street; 45°19′47″N 118°05′44″W	La Grande	
9	Hot Lake Resort	Hot Lake Resort	March 15, 1979 (#79002148)	66172 Highway 203; 45°14′35″N 117°57′28″W	La Grande vicinity	
10	A. B. Hudelson and Son Building	A. B. Hudelson and Son Building	October 28, 1999 (#99001286)	200 E Street; 45°01′39″N 117°55′08″W	North Powder	
11	La Grande Carnegie Library	La Grande Carnegie Library	June 17, 2026 (#100013138)	1006 Penn Avenue; 45°19′41″N 118°05′36″W	La Grande	
12	La Grande Commercial Historic District	La Grande Commercial Historic District	September 3, 2001 (#01000933)	Roughly bounded by Union Pacific Railroad tracks along Jefferson Street, Greenwood and Cove Streets, Washington Street, and 4th Street; 45°19′41″N 118°05′36″W	La Grande	
13	La Grande Neighborhood Club	La Grande Neighborhood Club	July 15, 1988 (#88001042)	1108 N Avenue; 45°19′26″N 118°05′43″W	La Grande	
14	Liberty Theater	Liberty Theater	August 5, 1999 (#99000948)	1008–1010 Adams Avenue; 45°19′45″N 118°05′45″W	La Grande	
15	Methodist Episcopal Church of Union	Methodist Episcopal Church of Union	September 23, 2025 (#100012335)	667 N Main Street; 45°12′48″N 117°51′55″W	Union	
16	Oregon Trail: La Grande to Hilgard Segment	Oregon Trail: La Grande to Hilgard Segment	June 28, 2021 (#100006679)	Hilgard Quadrangle, T3S R37E Secs. 10, 11, 12; T3S R38E Sec. 7 (South of I 84 between La Grande and Hilgard)	La Grande	
17	Roesch Building	Roesch Building	June 3, 1996 (#96000623)	101–111 Fir Street; 45°19′36″N 118°05′34″W	La Grande	
18	Slater Building	Slater Building	August 11, 1983 (#83002179)	214–224 Fir Street; 45°19′41″N 118°05′31″W	La Grande	
19	August J. Stange House	August J. Stange House	September 27, 1996 (#96001048)	1612 Walnut Street; 45°19′33″N 118°06′15″W	La Grande	
20	W. J. Townley House	W. J. Townley House	November 6, 1980 (#80003386)	782 N. 5th Street; 45°12′50″N 117°52′14″W	Union	
21	U.S. Post Office and Federal Building	U.S. Post Office and Federal Building	January 25, 1979 (#79002149)	1000 Adams Avenue; 45°19′46″N 118°05′46″W	La Grande	
22	Union Main Street Historic District	Union Main Street Historic District	August 20, 1997 (#97000907)	Along Main Street, between Birch and Fulton Streets; 45°12′33″N 117°51′56″W	Union	The buildings of Union's downtown core and oldest residential neighborhoods recall the town's long and vitalizing, but ultimately unsuccessful, rivalry in the late 19th century with nearby La Grande to lead Union County in transportation, commerce, population, and government. Significant structures include many from Union's period of rapid growth from its early years through World War I (1870–1919), and a smaller number from the decades just after the town reached its zenith (1920–1940).

== Former listings ==
	Name on the Register	Image	Date listed	Date removed	Location	City or town	Description
1	Union County Alliance Flouring Mill		August 25, 1980 (#80003385)	November 25, 1986	Willow St. and E. M Ave.	La Grande	Destroyed by fire on May 21, 1986.

== See also ==
- National Register of Historic Places listings in Oregon
- Listings in neighboring counties: Baker, Grant, Umatilla, Wallowa
- Historic preservation
- History of Oregon
- Lists of Oregon-related topics
