= Eagle Cap Excursion Train =

Train in Oregon, United States of America

Coordinates: 45.567°N 117.918°W

The Eagle Cap Excursion Train is a heritage railroad service located in Elgin, Oregon, United States, operated on a section of the 63-mile (101 km) line from Elgin to Joseph. The line is owned by the Wallowa Union Railroad (WURR), a public entity, which acquired it from private owners in 2002. The first excursion train was operated in 2003.

== History ==
The Union Pacific Railroad (UP) came to Union County in July 1884 when the main line between Salt Lake City, Utah and Portland, Oregon passed through La Grande.

The Oregon Railway and Navigation Company (OR&N) began construction on a branch line north to Elgin that was opened in December 1890. The OR&N itself was dissolved and its assets taken over by both the UP and the Northern Pacific Railway (NP) with the line from La Grande to Elgin transferring to the UP. UP extended the line over the next two decades north and east to Wallowa by 1908 and eventually to Enterprise and Joseph. Under UP operation, the line was commonly referred to as the "Joseph Branch".

UP identified the Joseph Branch for divestiture or abandonment in the late 1980s or early 1990s. In 1993, the line was sold to the railroad holding company Rio Grande Pacific Corporation (RGPC) of Fort Worth, Texas. RGPC created the Idaho Northern and Pacific Railroad to operate over the Joseph Branch & the Payette to Cascade line in Idaho

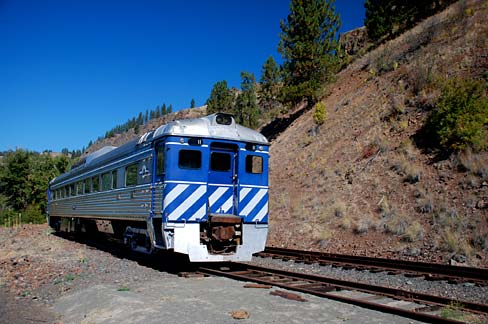
An RDC on the Eagle Cap train service, in Minam, in 2008

In 1997 the Joseph Branch was identified for abandonment later that year from Elgin to Joseph following the closure of the mill in Joseph.

The county governments in Union and Wallowa counties wanted to preserve this important transportation link and put together a proposal to purchase the 63 miles (101 km) of abandoned railroad. After acquiring the line in 2002, the counties and their respective economic development agencies and chambers of commerce sought potential operators of either a short line (class III) railroad or a heritage railroad, which would offer tourist excursions. Since 2013, The Friends of the Joseph Branch, a non-profit organization, has operated the excursion business under an agreement with the Wallowa Union Railroad Authority. The organization has grown the business, in revenue generated, number of passengers, and number of excursions each year.

The Eagle Cap Excursion Train began on August 3, 2002, six years after abandonment. The 2003 season began on May 17, 2003, under initial operation by Idaho Northern and Pacific railroad until the county could buy and equip locomotives and it continued in the fall of that year. The first full season of operation began in May 2004. The excursion trains are powered by diesel GP7u locomotives, which are stored in Elgin when not in use. Through the 2008 season, three of the passenger cars used in each train were Budd Rail Diesel Cars (RDCs), a self-propelled type of rail car. These three cars were not used in 2009 and 2010, and were sold in 2013 to the Idaho Northern and Pacific Railroad for use on its Payette River Flyer.

As of 2025, the service is scheduled to operate on 21 days through summer and fall. The service operates mostly between Elgin and a location known as Kimmel, and a round trip excursion takes about 3 1/2 hours. A longer round trip called Minam Bonus goes from Elgin to the settlement of Minam, where the Minam River joins the Wallowa River. This ride is offered two to three times each season and is about six hours in duration. The Mother's Day Brunch is a popular ride that kicks off the excursion season every year. Check the website for a full calendar and trip descriptions.

== See also ==
- List of heritage railroads in the United States
