= KBKR =

KBKR may refer to:

- KBKR (AM), a radio station (1490 AM) licensed to Baker, Oregon, United States
- KBKR-FM, a radio station (95.3 FM) licensed to Baker, Oregon, United States
