= La Grande station (Union Pacific Railroad) =

La Grande, OR
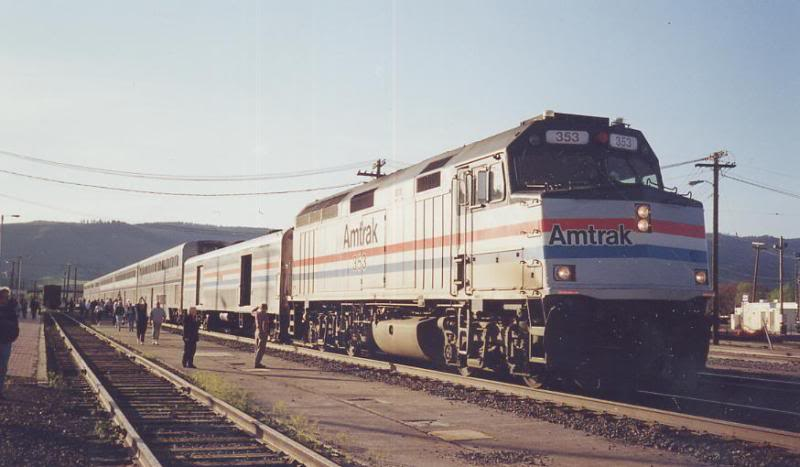
- The Pioneer at La Grande in 1997.

General information
- Location: 1150 Jefferson Avenue; La Grande, Oregon 97850
- System: Former Union Pacific Railroad and Amtrak station
- Owner: Union Pacific Railroad
- Line: Union Pacific Railroad Huntington / La Grande Subdivisions
- Platforms: 2 side, 1 island platform
- Tracks: 3

Construction
- Accessible: No

Other information
- Station code: LAE

History
- Opened: 1884, 1977
- Closed: 1971, 1997
- Rebuilt: 1890, 1904, 1930

Services
Preceding station	Amtrak	Following station
Pendleton toward Seattle	Pioneer	Baker City toward Chicago
Preceding station	Union Pacific Railroad	Following station
Perry toward Portland	Portland – Granger	Hot Lake toward Granger
Terminus	La Grande – Joseph	Island City toward Joseph
- La Grande Railroad Depot
- U.S. Historic district – Contributing property
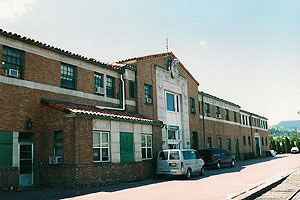
- The station in 2003.
- Coordinates: 45°19′47″N 118°05′37″W
- Built: 1930
- Architect: Gilbert Stanley Underwood
- Architectural style: Mediterranean Revival
- Part of: La Grande Commercial Historic District (ID01000933)
- Added to NRHP: September 3, 2001.
Location

La Grande station is a train station located in La Grande, Oregon. It was built by the Union Pacific Railroad along its main line to Portland in 1930 and was later used by Amtrak's Pioneer until it was discontinued in 1997. The station building still stands and is listed as a National Register of Historic Places contributing property as the La Grande Railroad Depot, in the La Grande Commercial Historic District.

== History ==
The Oregon Railway and Navigation Company built the railroad through La Grande, completing the line in 1884. The line was built from the west to connect with the Oregon Short Line Railroad at Huntington, Oregon. This offered connections with the Union Pacific Railroad, allowing connecting service to points as far as Omaha, Nebraska. La Grande was established as a "division point" for the railroad, and a rail yard, roundhouse, and other maintenance shops were also established near the depot. By 1890, both railroads were controlled by the Union Pacific, and it was established on its main line to Portland and Seattle. A branch line was also constructed from La Grande to Elgin in 1890, and extended to Joseph in 1908. The addition of the railroad to La Grande was seen as an "enormous influence" and it was estimated that a quarter of homes in the city were owned by railroad employees in 1925.

The first depot in La Grande was built in 1884, but was destroyed in a fire c. 1890. The second depot was destroyed in 1904, and a third depot was built to replace it, near Jefferson Street and Depot Street. The existing structure opened in December 1930 and was built out of stone, in contrast to the previous three wooden depots. The 1930-built station was designed in a Mediterranean Revival style by architect Gilbert Stanley Underwood, who designed twenty other Union Pacific stations across the country. It was noted as one of Underwood's last stations designed, due to the Great Depression in the 1930s. The station was built with two floors, with the ground floor containing waiting rooms, a ticket office, bathrooms, and baggage/freight areas. The second floor was not for public use, and used for Union Pacific offices. The exterior of the second floor contained terracotta panels, with "La Grande" and the logo of Union Pacific inscribed.

The station was primarily served by cross-country trains such as the City of Portland, Idahoan, Pacific Limited, and the Portland Rose. These trains provided connections to Portland, Omaha, and Chicago, among others. All Union Pacific passenger service ended on April 31, 1971, with the creation of Amtrak. La Grande was originally not on the initial services offered by Amtrak, and the closest service was the North Coast Hiawatha, on the former Northern Pacific Railway main line. Amtrak service to La Grande began on June 7, 1977, with the formation of the Pioneer, operating between Seattle and Chicago. Work was previously performed to bring La Grande up to Amtrak standards. The Pioneer served La Grande until a Congressional-funded mandate expired on May 10, 1997, and no deal was worked out between state governments to continue funding. Passenger service has not existed to La Grange since 1997, although efforts have been made to restore the route. In 2009, Amtrak published a report under the Passenger Rail Investment and Improvement Act of 2008 in order to determine the feasibility of returning Pioneer service. However, no major developments to restoring service have been made since the study was released. A 2019 study by the Oregon Department of Transportation concluded that the present location would be most ideal for the resumption of service.

The station is currently still used as a Union Pacific office, and La Grande is still operated as a division point, marking the beginning/end of the La Grande and Huntingdon Subdivisions, respectively. The former ticket area is used for dispatching and office space while the former baggage rooms contain storage and more office space. The branch line from La Grande to Joseph was sold to the Idaho Northern and Pacific Railroad in 1993. La Grande has been noted by Union Pacific as being "an important operational and crew change point." Greyhound Lines used to provide bus service at a station on East Penn Avenue in La Grande on a Portland–Boise line, but it was discontinued in January 2025
