= Wallowa Union Railroad Authority =

Railroad in Oregon, U.S.

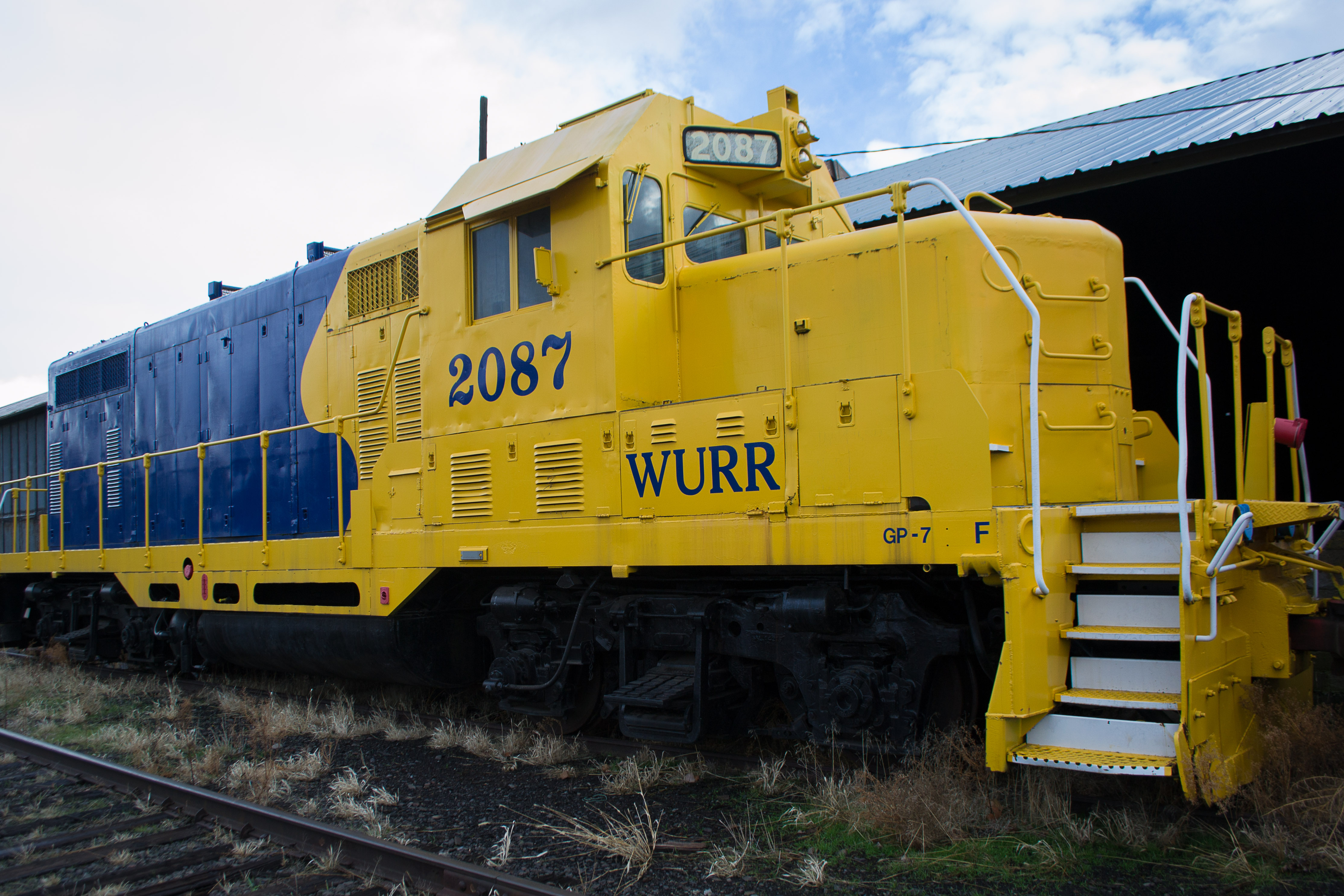
- A WURR engine in Elgin, Oregon, in 2012

Overview
- Reporting mark: WURR
- Locale: Oregon
- Dates of operation: 2003–

Technical
- Track gauge: 4 ft 8 1/2 in (1,435 mm) standard gauge
- Length: 62.58 mi (100.71 km)

The Wallowa Union Railroad Authority (reporting mark WURR) is a short-line railroad owned by Wallowa County and Union County in the U.S. state of Oregon. It operates freight and tourist trains over a 62.58-mile (100.71 km) ex-Union Pacific Railroad line from the end of an Idaho Northern and Pacific Railroad branch at Elgin to Joseph, generally paralleling Oregon Route 82.

The Oregon Railroad and Navigation Company, a predecessor of the Union Pacific Railroad (UP), completed a branch from the main line at La Grande through Elgin to Joseph in late 1908. The Idaho Northern and Pacific Railroad (INPR) leased (from La Grande to Elgin) and bought (from Elgin to Joseph) the line, among others, from the UP in November 1993. The Surface Transportation Board authorized abandonment beyond Elgin in 1997, but this was not consummated, and in 2002 Wallowa County purchased the line, still operated by the INPR. The new Wallowa Union Railroad Authority took over ownership from Wallowa County and operations from the INPR in 2003.

Since 2003, the Eagle Cap Excursion Train has operated on the line.
