= Nibley, Oregon =

Coordinates: 45.3331920°N 117.8802114°W

Nibley is an unincorporated historic community in Union County, Oregon, United States, about 11 miles east of La Grande on Oregon Route 237 in the Grande Ronde Valley.

Nibley was founded by Mormon businessmen Charles W. Nibley and George E. Stoddard. The two men purchased 8,000 acres (3,200 ha) from A. B. Conley, and the town was named after Charles Nibley. Charles Nibley, David Eccles, and George Stoddard organized the Oregon Sugar Company in 1898 and soon opened the first sugar beet processing plant in the Pacific Northwest in La Grande, which was eventually owned by the Amalgamated Sugar Company.

Beet production was less than expected, so the men organized the Oregon Land Company and purchased the Nibley property in 1900 to attract experienced beet farmers from their home state of Utah. By 1902 Nibley was a flourishing village with 20 families and a post office, but beet production continued to be low because of lack of water (as Nibley anticipated irrigation becoming available) and unfavorable weather.

In 1905 there was a typhoid epidemic and more bad weather. The Oregon Sugar Company factory in La Grande was closed in 1906, the town ceased to exist on December 29, 1906, and the post office shut down.

As a company town, Nibley was not considered a proper town by some historians. Nibley, Utah was also named for Charles W. Nibley.
