= KRJT =

Radio station serving Elgin, Oregon

Simulcasting KBKR-FM Baker City
- Elgin, Oregon; United States
- Broadcast area: La Grande, Oregon
- Frequency: 105.9 MHz
- Branding: Hit Radio 95.3 & 105.9

Programming
- Format: Classic hits

Ownership
- Owner: Pacific Empire Radio Corporation
- Sister stations: KBKR; KLBM; KBKR-FM; KUBQ

History
- First air date: 2005

Technical information
- Licensing authority: FCC
- Facility ID: 164224
- Class: A
- ERP: 115 watts
- HAAT: 584 meters (1916 feet)
- Transmitter coordinates: 45°26′26″N 117°53′31″W

Links
- Public license information: Public file; LMS

KRJT (105.9 FM, "Hit Radio 95.3 & 105.9") is an American radio station licensed to serve the community of Elgin, Oregon. The station is owned by the Pacific Empire Radio Corporation. All five stations owned and operated by Pacific Empire Radio Corporation share a radio studio building in La Grande, Oregon, located at 2510 Cove Ave.

== Programming ==
KRJT broadcasts a classic hits format to the greater La Grande, Oregon, area in simulcast with sister station KBKR-FM 95.3 in Baker City, Oregon. The joint broadcast is branded as "Hit Radio 95.3 & 105.9".

== History ==
This station received its original construction permit for a new FM station broadcasting at 105.9 MHz from the Federal Communications Commission on March 25, 2005. The new station was assigned the call letters KRJT by the FCC on August 24, 2005. KRJT received its license to cover from the FCC on February 2, 2006.

Logo as "Kool 106 FM"
