= KBKR-FM =

- Baker City, Oregon; United States
- Frequency: 95.3 MHz
- Branding: Hit Radio 95.3 & 105.9

Programming
- Format: Classic hits

Ownership
- Owner: Pacific Empire Radio Corporation
- Sister stations: KBKR; KLBM; KRJT; KUBQ

History
- First air date: 1981
- Former call signs: KBKR-FM (1979–1988); KKBC-FM (1988–2026)

Technical information
- Licensing authority: FCC
- Facility ID: 24795
- Class: A
- ERP: 6,000 watts
- HAAT: −61 meters (−200 ft)
- Transmitter coordinates: 44°47′18″N 117°48′35″W

Links
- Public license information: Public file; LMS

KBKR-FM (95.3 FM, "Hit Radio 95.3 & 105.9") is an American radio station licensed to serve Baker City, the county seat of Baker County, Oregon. The station is owned and operated by the Pacific Empire Radio Corporation. All five stations owned and operated by Pacific Empire Radio Corporation share a radio studio building in La Grande, Oregon, located at 2510 Cove Ave.

== Programming ==
KBKR-FM broadcasts a classic hits format to the greater Baker area in simulcast with sister station KRJT (105.9 FM) in Elgin, Oregon. The joint broadcast is branded as "Boomer Radio 95.3 & 105.9".

== History ==
This station received its original construction permit from the Federal Communications Commission on February 26, 1979. The new station was assigned the KBKR-FM call sign by the FCC. After multiple extensions to complete construction, KBKR-FM received its license to cover from the FCC on March 30, 1981.

In March 1988, Oregon Trail Broadcasting, Inc., reached an agreement to sell this station to Grande Radio, Inc. The deal was approved by the FCC on April 26, 1988, and the transaction was consummated on May 16, 1988. The new owners had the FCC change the call sign to KKBC-FM on May 23, 1988.

After two failed attempts to sell the station in 1998 and 2000, Grande Radio, Inc., reached an agreement in June 2004 to sell this station to Pacific Empire Radio Corporation (Mark Bolland, president/CEO) as part of a four-station deal valued at $1.9 million. The deal was approved by the FCC on July 19, 2004, and the transaction was consummated on September 3, 2004. At the time of the sale, KKBC-FM broadcast a classic hits music format.

The call sign was changed back to KBKR-FM on April 28, 2026.
