= John Anthony House =

Historic house in Oregon, United States

- U.S. National Register of Historic Places
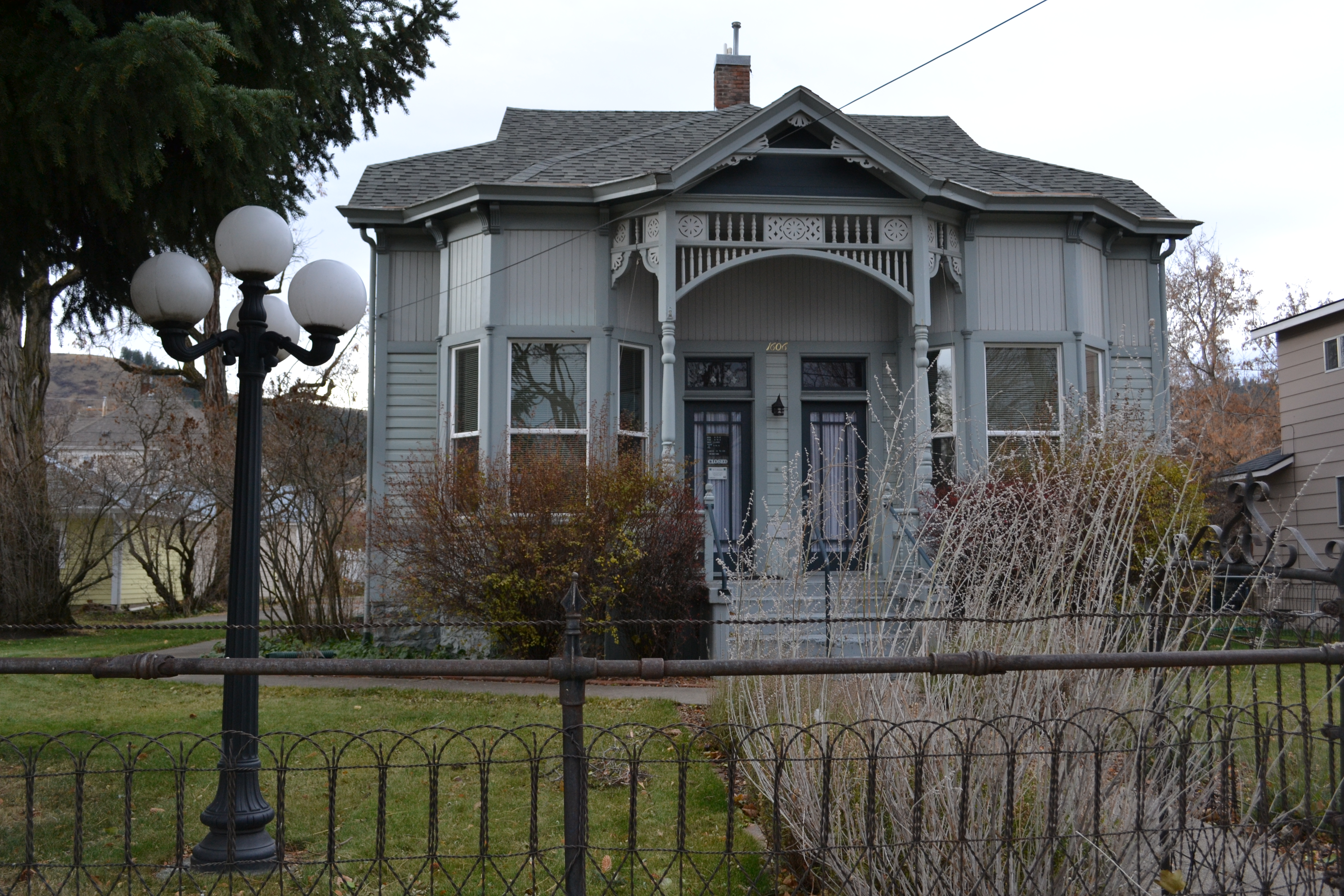
- The Anthony House in 2011

- Location within Oregon Location within the United States
- Location: 1606 6th Street; La Grande, Oregon
- Coordinates: 45°19′33″N 118°05′41″W
- Area: Less than 1 acre (0.40 ha)
- Built: 1890
- Architectural style: Stick/Eastlake, with some Italianate details
- NRHP reference No.: 88001530
- Added to NRHP: September 22, 1988

The John Anthony House is a historic residence in La Grande, Oregon, United States.

The house was listed on the National Register of Historic Places in 1988. By 2012, it had been adapted for use as professional offices.

== See also ==
- National Register of Historic Places listings in Union County, Oregon
