= Oregon Route 237 =

State highway in Union County, Oregon, US

Oregon Route 237
- Route 237 highlighted in red

Route information
- Maintained by ODOT
- Length: 38.93 mi (62.65 km)

Major junctions
- South end: I-84 / US 30 in North Powder
- OR 203 in Union
- North end: OR 82 in Island City

Location
- Country: United States
- State: Oregon
- County: Union

Highway system
- Oregon Highways; Interstate; US; State; Named; Scenic
← OR 234	→ OR 238

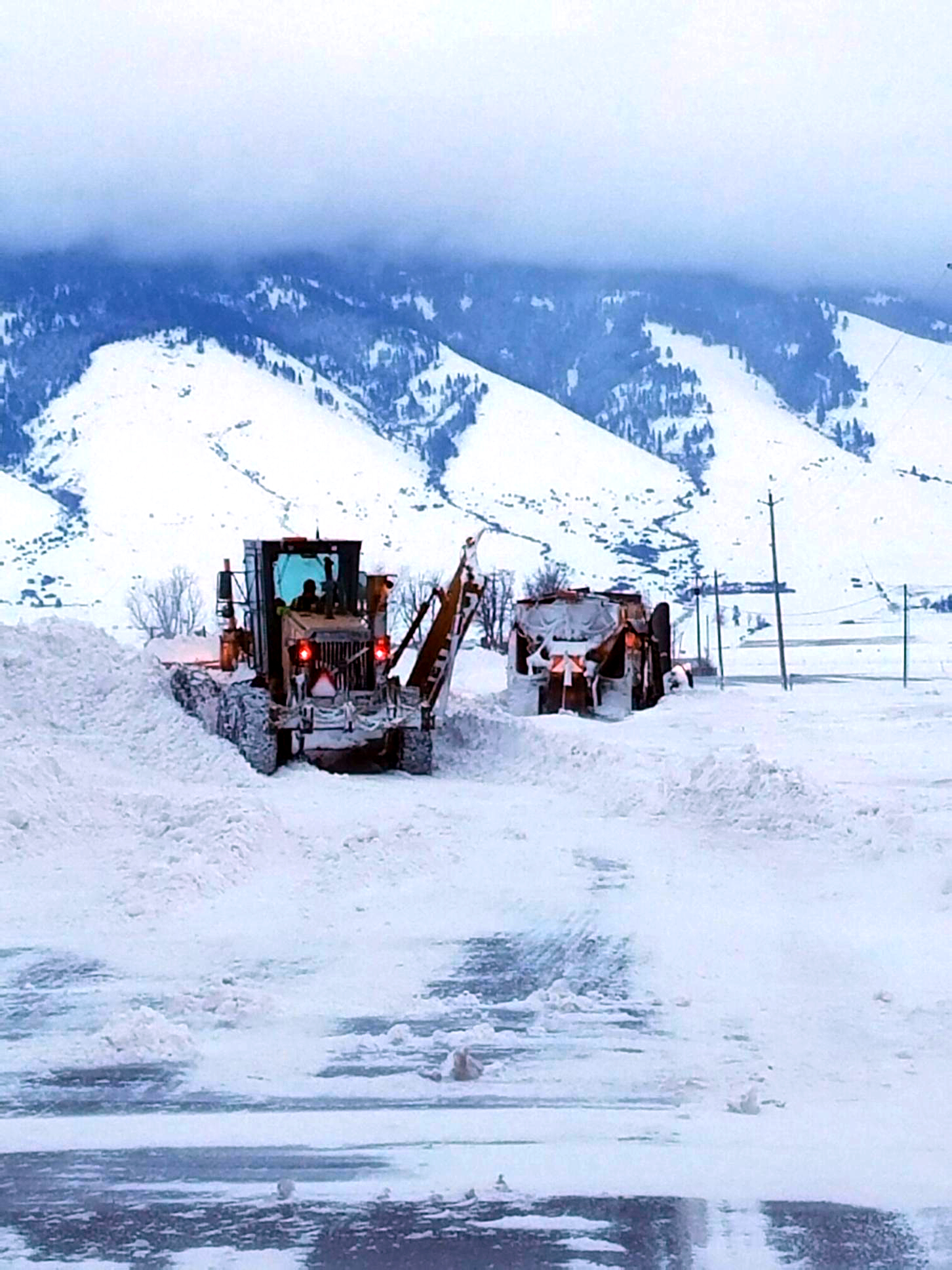
Snow removal on Route 237

Oregon Route 237 is an Oregon state highway running from OR 82 in Island City to Interstate 84 and U.S. Route 30 in North Powder. OR 237 is composed of the Cove Highway No. 342 (see Oregon highways and routes) and part of the La Grande-Baker Highway No. 66. It is a combined 38.93 miles (62.65 km) long and runs generally northwest to southeast in an inverted L pattern.

== Route description ==
OR 237 begins at an intersection with OR 82 in Island City. It heads east to Cove, where it turns south, then west, then south again to Union, where it overlaps OR 203 for 0.58 miles (0.93 km). After the concurrency ends, OR 237 continues south to an intersection with I-84 and US 30 in North Powder, where it ends.

== Major intersections ==
The entire route is in Union County.

Location	mi	km	Destinations	Notes
Island City	0.00	0.00	OR 82 to I-84 – La Grande, Imbler, Elgin, Enterprise	
Union	22.07	35.52	OR 203 north – Hot Lake, La Grande	Begin concurrency
Union	22.65	36.45	OR 203 south – Medical Springs	End concurrency
North Powder	38.43	61.85	I-84 / US 30 – La Grande, Haines, Anthony Lakes, Baker City	
1.000 mi = 1.609 km; 1.000 km = 0.621 mi: Concurrency terminus
