= KLBM =

Simulcasting KBKR, Baker City, OR
- La Grande, Oregon; United States
- Frequency: 1450 kHz
- Branding: Supertalk 1450

Programming
- Format: Talk radio
- Affiliations: USA Radio Network; Fox Sports Radio

Ownership
- Owner: Pacific Empire Radio Corporation
- Sister stations: KBKR; KBKR-FM; KUBQ; KRJT

History
- First air date: 1938
- Call sign meaning: Land of Blue Mountains

Technical information
- Licensing authority: FCC
- Facility ID: 35047
- Class: C
- Power: 1,000 watts (unlimited)
- Transmitter coordinates: 45°19′45″N 118°4′0″W

Links
- Public license information: Public file; LMS
- Website: newsoforegon.com/supertalk

KLBM (1450 AM, "Supertalk 1450") is a radio station in La Grande, Oregon. KLBM is simulcast with KBKR in Baker City, Oregon. It is owned by Pacific Empire Radio Corporation.

All five stations owned and operated by Pacific Empire Radio Corporation share a radio studio building in La Grande, Oregon, located at 2510 Cove Avenue.

== History ==
KLBM (Land of Blue Mountains) was founded in 1938 and originally was located on U.S. 30 just outside La Grande's east city limit. Later, the station moved its studios and offices to the Sacajawea Hotel in downtown La Grande. In June 1970, KLBM moved to Cove Avenue.

KLBM also had an FM station, originally known as KFMT, which it purchased in the late 1970s, changing the call letters to KLBM-FM.

For much of its history, KLBM-AM 1450 followed an adult contemporary music format and was affiliated with the ABC radio network. As the only station in La Grande for many years, KLBM offered a wide variety of local programming: "Man on the Street" interviews, live remotes during special events, and coverage of La Grande High School and Eastern Oregon University sports. KLBM was also a longtime member of the University of Oregon and Oregon State University football radio networks, and of the National Basketball Association's (NBA) Portland Trail Blazers radio network. In its early days, the station used a "shunt fed" 173 foot self-supporting steel tower.

In 2010 under new program director Shain Bolland, the station decided to add sports back into its programming by adding the Johnny Ballgame Show, a two time award-winning daily sports talk program formerly in Moscow, Idaho, hosted by John Mallory. In addition to the Johnny Ballgame Show, KLBM signed contracts to broadcast Oregon State University and Boise State University football and Portland Trail Blazers basketball (NBA).

KLBM is well known for its program, Tradio, a live call-in program in which callers can buy/sell/trade items to each other within the community.

A fallout shelter behind the station at its current location once boasted the resources (food, water and propane-fired electrical generators) to run the AM station remotely on reduced power with a staff of two for 14 days.

== Station alumni ==
KLBM's long-term air personalities of the past include Warren Curry, who was on the air from the 1950s to the late 1970s, and continued as chief engineer until the early 1990s. Another enduring KLBM "voice" was that of Ken Lillard, who owned the station for more than 40 years before selling it and retiring in 1984. Lillard was a regular on-air announcer from the 1940s to the 1960s, and continued producing advertising spots and special programming until his retirement. He died in March 2008. Other past air personalities include Leonard Hermens, George Clymer, John Farrar, Gary Alan, John Shay, Ron Furbie, Doug Johnson, Shawn Zurbrick, Steve Walther, & Thomas Barnes (The Eastern Oregon Pirate). In addition to Lillard and Curry, another long-term alumni was Robert "Bob" Maszk, who served as news director at KLBM for several decades and also served briefly as an anchor-reporter for La Grande's short-lived commercial TV station KTVR. Early 1950s - J Pierpont Pupuli AKA: Dean E. Lewis, had a morning show in the early 1950s called the "Morning Massacre". Post ww2 sound effects of machine guns, aerial warfare, etc. a lead in to the Morning Massacre. Mr. Lewis was a war veteran and returned to active duty with the US Army Air Corps soon to be the USAF. Mr. Lewis located to Klamath Falls, Oregon with his family.
