= Liberty Theater (La Grande, Oregon) =

- U.S. National Register of Historic Places
- U.S. Historic district – Contributing property
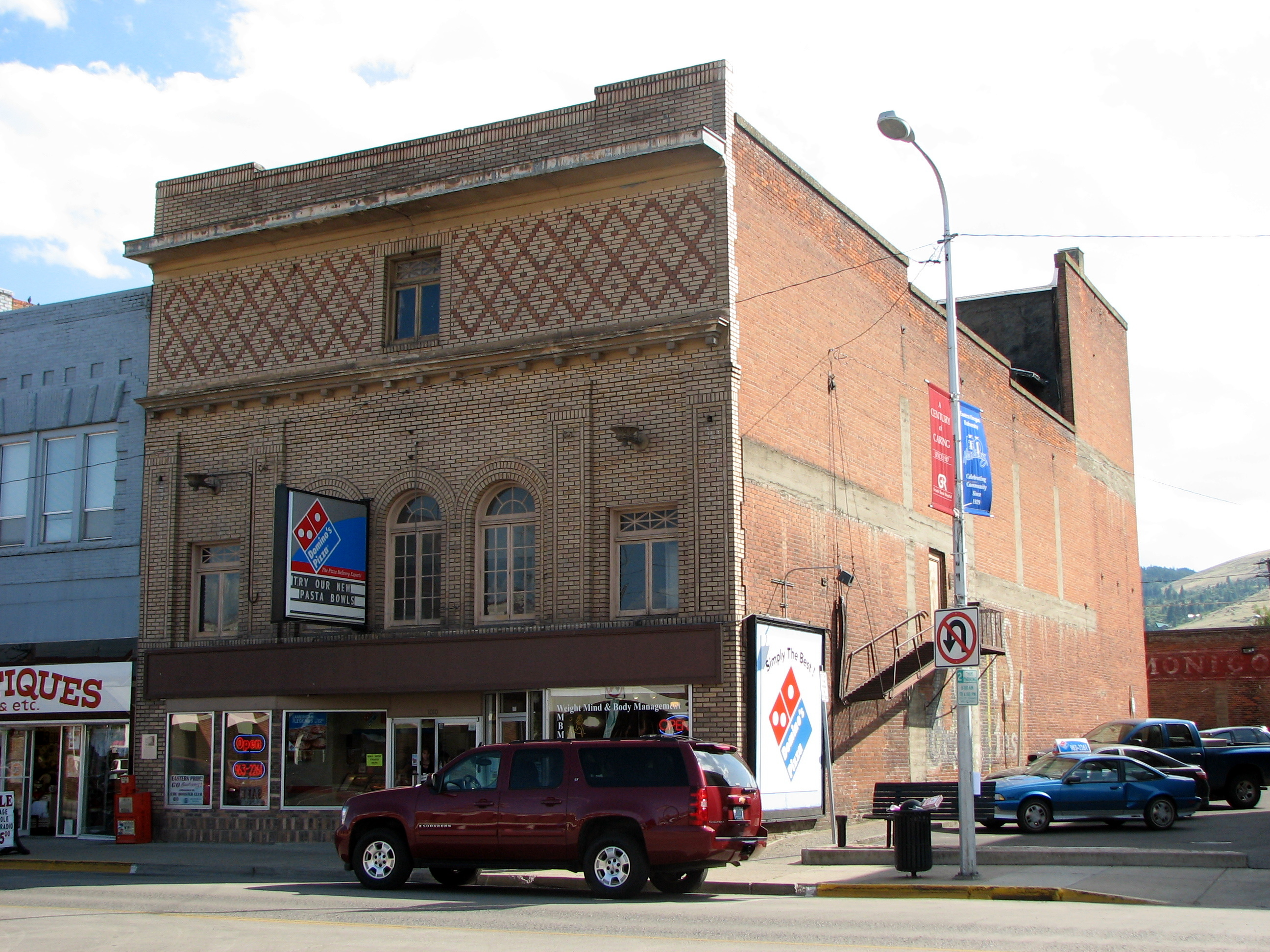
- The Liberty Theater in 2009
- Location: 1008–1010 Adams Avenue; La Grande, Oregon
- Coordinates: 45°19′45″N 118°05′45″W
- Area: 0.1 acres (0.040 ha)
- Built: 1910
- Built by: S. A. Gardinier (attributed)
- Architectural style: Commercial style
- Part of: La Grande Commercial Historic District (ID01000933)
- NRHP reference No.: 99000948
- Added to NRHP: August 5, 1999

The Liberty Theater is a historic theater building in La Grande, Oregon, United States.

The theater was listed on the National Register of Historic Places in 1999.

== See also ==
- National Register of Historic Places listings in Union County, Oregon
