= United States Post Office and Federal Building (La Grande, Oregon) =

- U.S. Post Office
- U.S. National Register of Historic Places
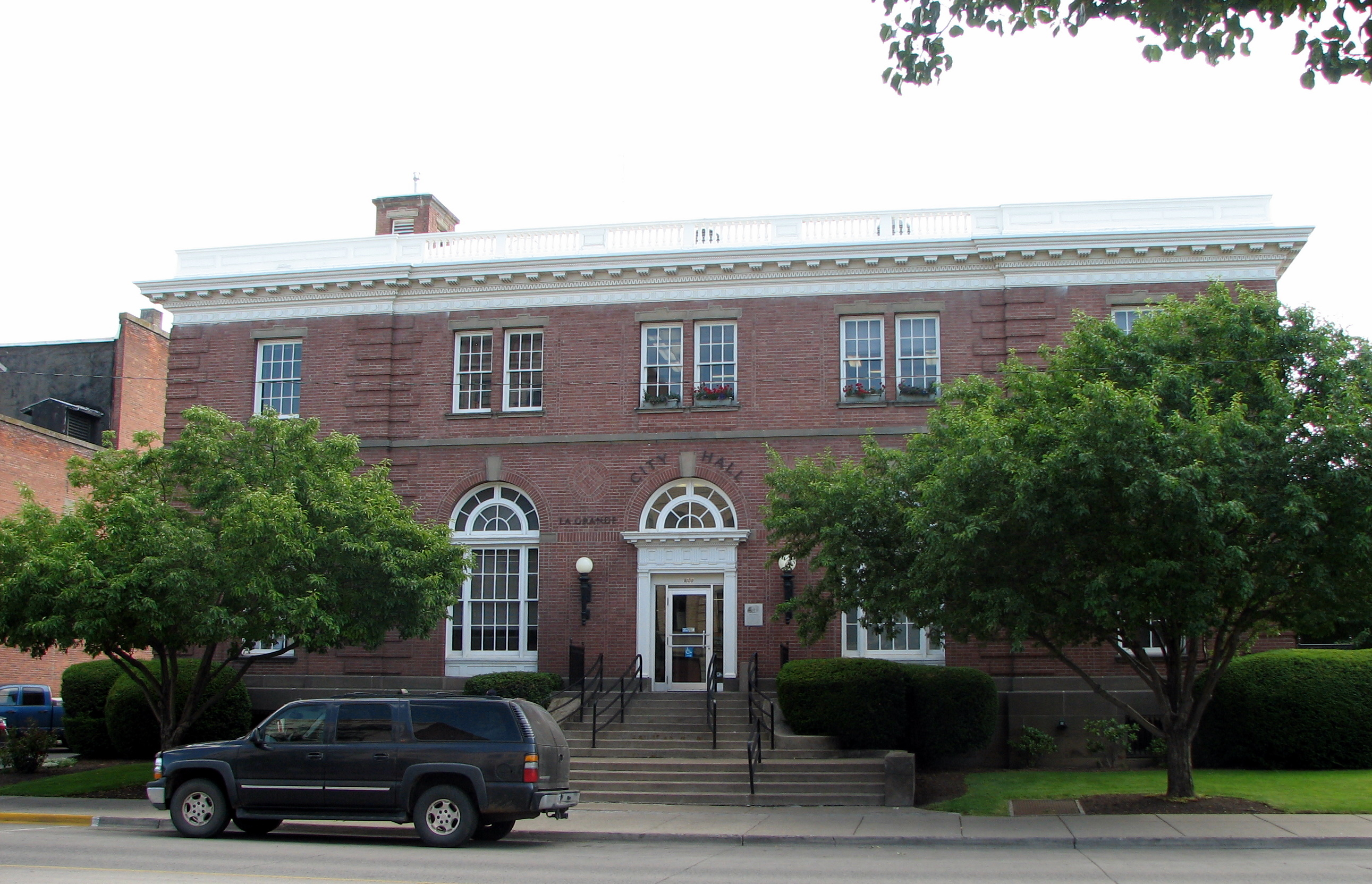
- The building's exterior in 2009

- Location within Oregon Location within the United States
- Location: 1000 Adams Avenue; La Grande, Oregon
- Coordinates: 45°19′46″N 118°5′46″W
- Built: 1913
- Architect: Taylor, James R.
- Architectural style: Colonial Revival
- NRHP reference No.: 79002149
- Added to NRHP: January 25, 1979

The United States Post Office and Federal Building is a post office building in La Grande, Oregon. It is listed on the National Register of Historic Places. It now functions as the La Grande city hall.

== See also ==
- List of United States post offices
- National Register of Historic Places listings in Union County, Oregon
