= Oregon Sugar Company =

The Oregon Sugar Company was a sugar beet growing and processing operation created by the founders of the Amalgamated Sugar Company of Utah.

The company was incorporated February 12, 1898, by David Eccles, Charles W. Nibley, and George Stoddard. A shareholder meeting was held on February 26, 1898 in Baker City, Oregon, and a factory was built in La Grande, Oregon, thereafter. Eccles was president of the company and the board of directors included Thomas R. Cutler, Nibley, Stoddard and William Eccles. The factory was built by the E. H. Dyer Construction Company of Cleveland, Ohio, and was "almost identical" to the layout of Amalgamated's Ogden factory.

The sugar beet refining factory in La Grande was built in 1898 and Oregon Sugar also founded the company town of Nibley, Oregon, where Mormons raised sugar beets for the factory.

By 1904, due to farmer reluctance, Oregon Sugar began farming sugar beets directly, after purchasing 1,182 acres (4.78 km^{2}) of land. The region was never very productive for sugar beets, and closing the factory was seriously considered in 1907. An outside expert was brought in who made a "very voluminous report", which confirmed the area was not likely to become more productive, even with changes. In 1908, the factory only operated on 28 days due to low yields, and a special committee was appointed to plan for the removal of the factory. The factory, "a mistake from the beginning and soon recognized as such", was shuttered in 1912. The only reason the factory was not removed sooner was the need for a new location for the machinery.

An 1898 account of the sugar factory was published in the La Grande Daily Chronicle:

The main building has 320 tons of structural steel and upwards of 1500 tons of machinery…The beets as they come from the shed are carried to the factory in a stream of water; they are then thoroughly washed and elevated to the upper part of the building, where they go through a slicing machine. After being sliced they go into a battery of cells, which are heated by steam, and the juice is extracted from the pulp by a process called "diffusion," which is exactly the same as extracting the essence of coffee from the berry or of tea from the leaves. The juice is then subjected to a chemical process, being mixed with lime…It is expected that 6,000,000 pounds of granulated sugar will be made this season…
