= KBKR (AM) =

- Baker City, Oregon; United States
- Broadcast area: La Grande, Oregon
- Frequency: 1490 kHz
- Branding: Supertalk 1490

Programming
- Format: Talk radio
- Affiliations: USA Radio Network; Fox Sports Radio

Ownership
- Owner: Pacific Empire Radio Corporation
- Sister stations: KLBM; KBKR-FM; KUBQ; KRJT

History
- First air date: 1939
- Call sign meaning: Baker

Technical information
- Licensing authority: FCC
- Facility ID: 24794
- Class: C
- Power: 1,000 watts (unlimited)
- Transmitter coordinates: 44°47′18″N 117°48′35″W
- Repeater: 1450 KLBM (La Grande)

Links
- Public license information: Public file; LMS
- Website: newsoforegon.com/supertalk

KBKR (1490 AM, "Supertalk 1490") is a commercial radio station licensed to Baker City, Oregon, United States. Owned by the Pacific Empire Radio Corporation, it carries a talk radio format in a joint simulcast with KLBM in La Grande, Oregon.

All five stations owned and operated by Pacific Empire Radio Corporation share a radio studio building in La Grande, Oregon, located at 2510 Cove Ave.

== History ==
=== The beginning ===
This station began broadcasting on 1500 kHz in 1939. The station was assigned the KBKR call sign by the Federal Communications Commission. Starting in early 1941KBKR was broadcasting with 250 watts of power on a frequency of 1490 kHz under the ownership of the Baker Broadcasting Company which was in turn owned and operated by Glenn McCormick. McCormick also served as the station's general manager while Kenneth B. Lockwood was the commercial manager.

In 1949 KBKR was sold to Inland Radio, Inc., which was in turn owned by broadcasting pioneer Gordon Capps. Lee W. Jacobs was the company president while Kenneth B. Lockwood served as general manager.

On June 1, 1955, KBKR was acquired by Kenneth B. Lockwood and his wife Barbara L. Lockwood operating as the Oregon Trail Broadcasting Company. Kenneth Lockwood continued to serve as the station's general manager, a role he would hold until he sold the station in 1988.

The station received authorization from the FCC in 1962 to increase its daytime signal power from 250 watts to 1,000 watts. The nighttime signal stayed at the previous 250 watt output. KBKR maintained its middle of the road music format through the 1970s.

=== Grande Radio ===
In March 1988, the Oregon Trail Broadcasting Company reached an agreement to sell this station to Grande Radio, Inc. The deal was approved by the FCC on April 26, 1988, and the transaction was consummated on May 16, 1988.

A full decade later, in May 1998, Grande Radio, Inc., reached an agreement to sell this station to Vista Grande, LLC. The deal was approved by the FCC on July 6, 1998, but the transaction was not consummated and control of KBKR remained with Grande Radio. In March 2000, Grande Radio, Inc., reached a new agreement to sell KBKR, this time to Horizon Broadcasting Group, LLC (William Ackerley, CEO) as part of a four-station deal valued at $1.7 million. The deal was approved by the FCC on April 25, 2000, but once again the transaction was not consummated and Grande Radio retained the KBKR broadcast license. At the time of the aborted sale, KBKR aired a news/talk format.

=== KBKR today ===
Former logo

In June 2004, Grande Radio, Inc., contracted to sell this station to the Pacific Empire Radio Corporation (Mark Bolland, president/CEO) as part of a four-station deal valued at $1.9 million. The deal was approved by the FCC on July 19, 2004, and the transaction was consummated on September 3, 2004. At the time of the sale, KBKR broadcast a talk radio format. The station still utilizes a "shunt fed" style antenna.

== Station alumni ==
Robert Lindahl, the recording engineer on The Kingsmen's famous version of "Louie Louie", worked as a weekend disc jockey for KBKR for a short time in 1941. Lindahl says he was let go, not for anything he did on the air, but because he refused to empty the tank on the station's chemical toilet.

== Programming ==
Local programing includes a "swap and shop" show called Tradio every weekday morning, a weekday interview show called Your Voice, plus a weekend cooking show called Cooking Outdoors With Mr. BBQ. Along with nationally syndicated talk shows composing the balance of the schedule, the station also carries Fox Sports Radio on the weekends.

KBKR and KLBM broadcast the men's basketball and women's basketball games, home and away, of the Eastern Oregon University Mountaineers. Beginning with the 2009 season, the stations will broadcast the school's college football games as well.
