= Medical Springs, Oregon =

Unincorporated community in the state of Oregon, United States

- Unincorporated community
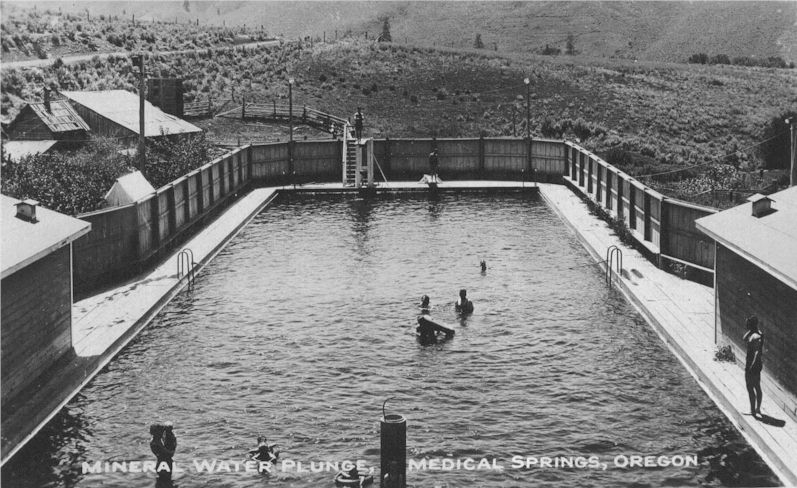
- Medical Springs mineral pool, ca. 1912
- Interactive map of Medical Springs, Oregon
- Coordinates: 45°1′1.2″N 117°37′44.4″W
- Country: United States
- State: Oregon
- County: Union
- Established: December 4, 1868
- Elevation: 3,396 ft (1,035 m)
- Time zone: UTC-8 (Pacific)
  - Summer (DST): UTC-7 (Pacific)
- ZIP codes: 97814

Medical Springs is a rural unincorporated community in Union County, Oregon, United States. It is located near the southern extremity of Union County on Oregon Route 203, just outside Wallowa-Whitman National Forest. It is located twenty miles southeast of Union and twenty-four miles northeast of Baker City.

== History ==
Medical Springs was homesteaded in the nineteenth century by Dunham and Artemisia Wright, and comprised 280 acres. Dunham Wright was a cousin of Abraham Lincoln and an early Oregon politician, who established the area on December 4, 1868, after the discovery of hot springs there. Dunham described his first view of the springs and the Native Americans camped there: "The springs were located in a big willow grove. The men would build a number of small dams across the streams that ran from the springs. The water would accumulate to the depth of about twenty inches. Sticks were placed around the edge, and then a big elk hide or blanket would be stretched across the top to keep the steam in."

In 1869, Wright built a cabin and small bathhouse there, modeling the area as a resort town around the thermal springs. In 1886, a two-story hotel housing forty guest rooms was built, which eventually included two parlors and a ballroom. In 1905 a sanitarium, general store, and post office were constructed, and the town attracted residents from nearby Union and La Grande; however, unlike nearby Hot Lake Resort, which catered to wealthy travelers, Medical Springs attracted miners, gamblers, and cowboys. The hotel burned down in a fire in 1917, which was replaced with a modest six-room hotel the following year in 1918.

The town's main attraction in its heyday was its Olympic-size swimming pool, built in 1929, which runs nine feet in depth at its deepest end, and is sourced from the hot springs themselves, whose mineral waters are thought to be therapeutic. The springs emerge from the ground at 140°F, and are piped to the pool, where the water cools to 104 °F.

Dunham Wright continued to live at the resort until his death in 1942, shortly after his hundredth birthday. The swimming pool and hotel eventually closed down in the 1950s after the mill in the neighboring town of Pondosa burned to the ground, which drained the area of revenue and eventually led to a drastic decrease in population.

As of 2022, the hotel, a private residence, and the abandoned general store are the only buildings left standing, and the swimming pool is no longer open to the public.
