= Dunham Wright =

American politician and pioneer

Dunham Wright (March 13, 1842 – December 5, 1942) was an American politician and pioneer settler in Oregon. He was Abraham Lincoln's cousin and homesteaded in the area presently known as Medical Springs, Oregon. He served in the Oregon House of Representatives in 1872.
