= Anthony–Buckley House =

Historic house in Oregon, United States

- Anthony-Buckley House
- U.S. National Register of Historic Places
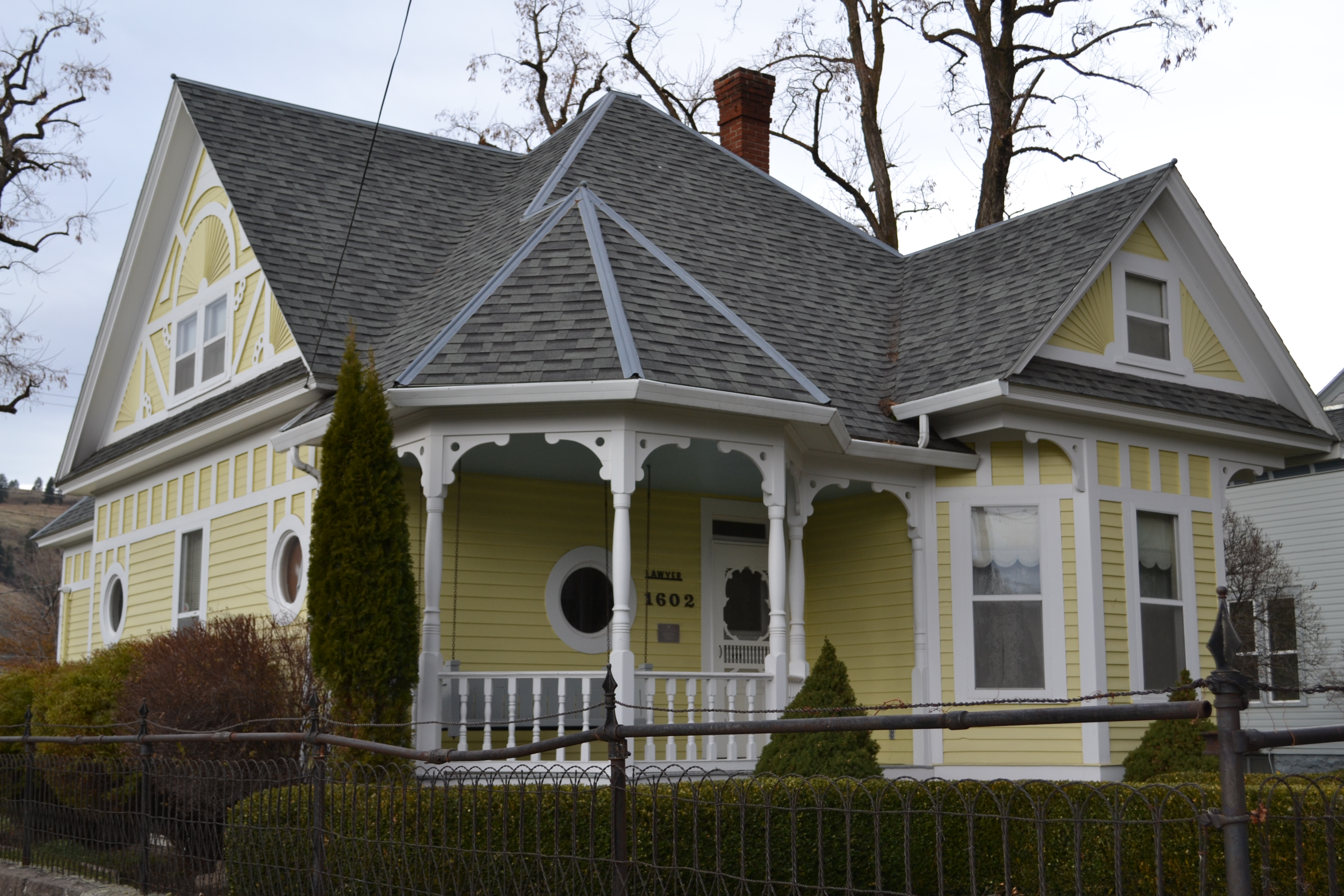

- Location within Oregon Location within the United States
- Location: 1602 6th St., La Grande, Oregon
- Coordinates: 45°19′33″N 118°5′37″W
- Area: less than one acre
- Built: 1902
- Architectural style: Queen Anne, Colonial Revival, Stick/Eastlake
- NRHP reference No.: 85000372
- Added to NRHP: February 28, 1985

The Anthony–Buckley House is a historic Queen Anne style house in La Grande, Oregon, that was built in 1902. It was listed on the National Register of Historic Places in 1985.

It is locally significant for its late Queen Anne style architecture; it includes Stick/Eastlake and Colonial Revival elements, too. The property also has original fencing of stone, cast iron, and woven wires. It also is significant for association with Swiss immigrant John Anthony who first owned the house, and for association with Anthony Buckley.
