= Island City, Oregon =

- City
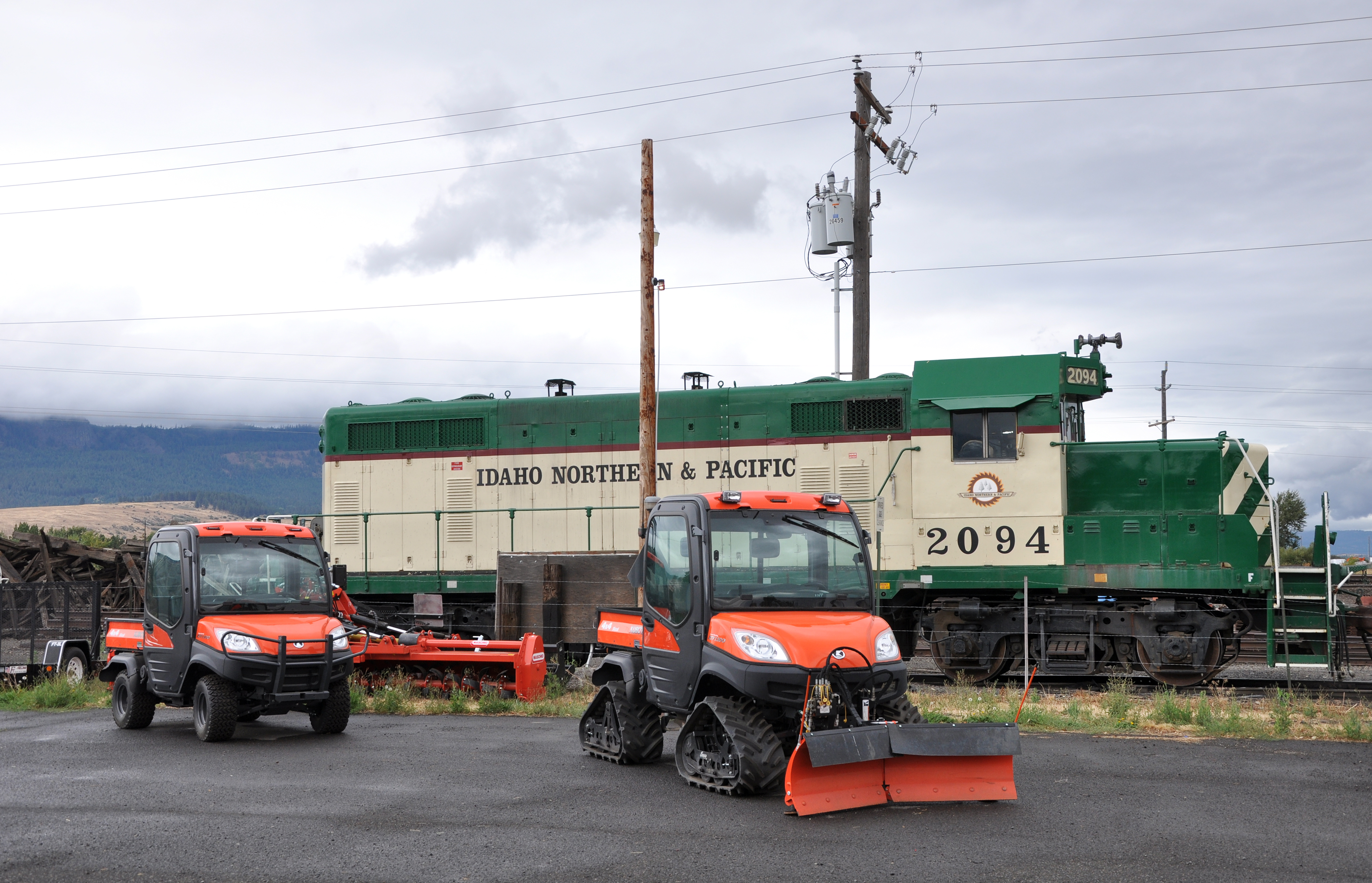
- Locomotive and other vehicles near Island Avenue

- Location in Oregon
- Coordinates: 45°20′09″N 118°02′57″W
- Country: United States
- State: Oregon
- County: Union
- Incorporated: 1904

Government
  - Mayor: Dave Comfort

Area
  - Total: 0.98 sq mi (2.55 km^{2})
  - Land: 0.98 sq mi (2.55 km^{2})
  - Water: 0 sq mi (0.00 km^{2})
- Elevation: 2,740 ft (840 m)

Population (2020)
  - Total: 1,144
  - Density: 1,162.5/sq mi (448.86/km^{2})
- Time zone: UTC-8 (Pacific)
  - Summer (DST): UTC-7 (Pacific)
- ZIP code: 97850
- Area codes: 458 and 541
- FIPS code: 41-36750
- GNIS feature ID: 2410120
- Website: islandcityoregon.gov

Island City is a city in Union County, Oregon, United States. Its name originated from the city's location on an island between the Grande Ronde River and a nearby slough. However, the slough was later diverted, removing the city's island status. As of the 2020 census, Island City had a population of 1,144.

== Community ==
A Boise Cascade particle board plant existed near Island City.

The Lighthouse Pentecostal Church is located in Island City, and was the site of a community COVID-19 outbreak over the weekend of June 13–14, 2020. By June 16 there were 236 cases linked to the church due to a wedding that weekend. It was noted that the church held in-person services without social distancing or masks in April and as late as May 24, and the church had also held a wedding and a graduation, each attended by over 100 people.

== Geography ==
Island City lies at the intersection of Oregon Route 82 and Oregon Route 237 on the northeastern outskirts of La Grande. According to the United States Census Bureau, the city has a total area of 0.98 square miles (2.54 km^{2}), all land.

== Demographics ==
Historical population
Census	Pop.	Note	%±
1910	166		—
1920	141		−15.1%
1930	116		−17.7%
1940	177		52.6%
1950	138		−22.0%
1960	158		14.5%
1970	202		27.8%
1980	477		136.1%
1990	696		45.9%
2000	916		31.6%
2010	989		8.0%
2020	1,144		15.7%
U.S. Decennial Census

=== 2020 census ===
As of the 2020 census, Island City had a population of 1,144. The median age was 43.3 years. 22.7% of residents were under the age of 18 and 23.1% were 65 years of age or older. For every 100 females there were 93.9 males, and for every 100 females age 18 and over there were 88.5 males age 18 and over.

99.0% of residents lived in urban areas, while 1.0% lived in rural areas.

There were 470 households in Island City, of which 28.5% had children under the age of 18 living in them. Of all households, 54.0% were married-couple households, 12.8% were households with a male householder and no spouse or partner present, and 25.7% were households with a female householder and no spouse or partner present. About 23.8% of all households were made up of individuals and 14.1% had someone living alone who was 65 years of age or older.

There were 476 housing units, of which 1.3% were vacant. Among occupied housing units, 73.8% were owner-occupied and 26.2% were renter-occupied. The homeowner vacancy rate was <0.1% and the rental vacancy rate was 2.4%.

Racial composition as of the 2020 census
Race	Number	Percent
White	990	86.5%
Black or African American	5	0.4%
American Indian and Alaska Native	11	1.0%
Asian	11	1.0%
Native Hawaiian and Other Pacific Islander	30	2.6%
Some other race	30	2.6%
Two or more races	67	5.9%
Hispanic or Latino (of any race)	57	5.0%

=== 2010 census ===
At the 2010 census, there were 989 people, 399 households and 298 families living in the city. The population density was 1,009.2 inhabitants per square mile (389.7/km^{2}). There were 416 housing units at an average density of 424.5 per square mile (163.9/km^{2}). The racial make-up was 94.7% White, 0.1% African American, 0.6% Native American, 0.5% Asian, 0.8% Pacific Islander, 0.9% from other races, and 2.3% from two or more races. Hispanic or Latino of any race were 3.4% of the population.

There were 399 households, of which 29.6% had children under the age of 18 living with them. 62.2% were married couples living together, 10.0% had a female householder with no husband present, 2.5% had a male householder with no wife present and 25.3% were non-families. 21.3% of all households were made up of individuals, and 10.8% had someone living alone who was 65 years of age or older. The average household size was 2.45 and the average family size was 2.81.

The median age was 43.5 years. 23.8% of residents were under the age of 18; 6.2% were between the ages of 18 and 24; 22.4% were from 25 to 44; 27.3% were from 45 to 64; and 20.6% were 65 years of age or older. The gender make-up was 49.4% male and 50.6% female.

=== 2000 census ===
At the 2000 census, there were 916 people, 357 households and 280 families living in the city. The population density was 1,055.3 inhabitants per square mile (407.5/km^{2}). There were 375 housing units at an average density of 432.0 per square mile (166.8/km^{2}). The racial make-up was 95.41% White, 0.22% African American, 1.20% Native American, 0.76% Asian, 0.33% Pacific Islander, 1.09% from other races, and 0.98% from two or more races. Hispanic or Latino of any race were 2.07% of the population.

There were 357 households, of which 31.9% had children under the age of 18 living with them, 70.6% were married couples living together, 6.4% had a female householder with no husband present, and 21.3% were non-families. 17.9% of all households were made up of individuals, and 9.2% had someone living alone who was 65 years of age or older. The average household size was 2.57 and the average family size was 2.87.

23.7% of the population were under the age of 18, 7.1% from 18 to 24, 24.7% from 25 to 44, 28.2% from 45 to 64, and 16.4% who were 65 years of age or older. The median age was 42 years. For every 100 females, there were 98.3 males. For every 100 females age 18 and over, there were 94.2 males.

The median household income was $43,977 and the median family income was $49,327. Males had a median income of $39,250 and females $20,486. The per capita income was $19,138. About 3.3% of families and 5.9% of the population were below the poverty line, including 3.9% of those under age 18 and 9.3% of those age 65 or over.

== Education ==
It is within La Grande School District 1.

Union County is not in the boundary of any community college district.
