= Ascension Episcopal Church (Cove, Oregon) =

Historic church in Oregon, United States

- Ascension Episcopal Church and Rectory
- U.S. National Register of Historic Places
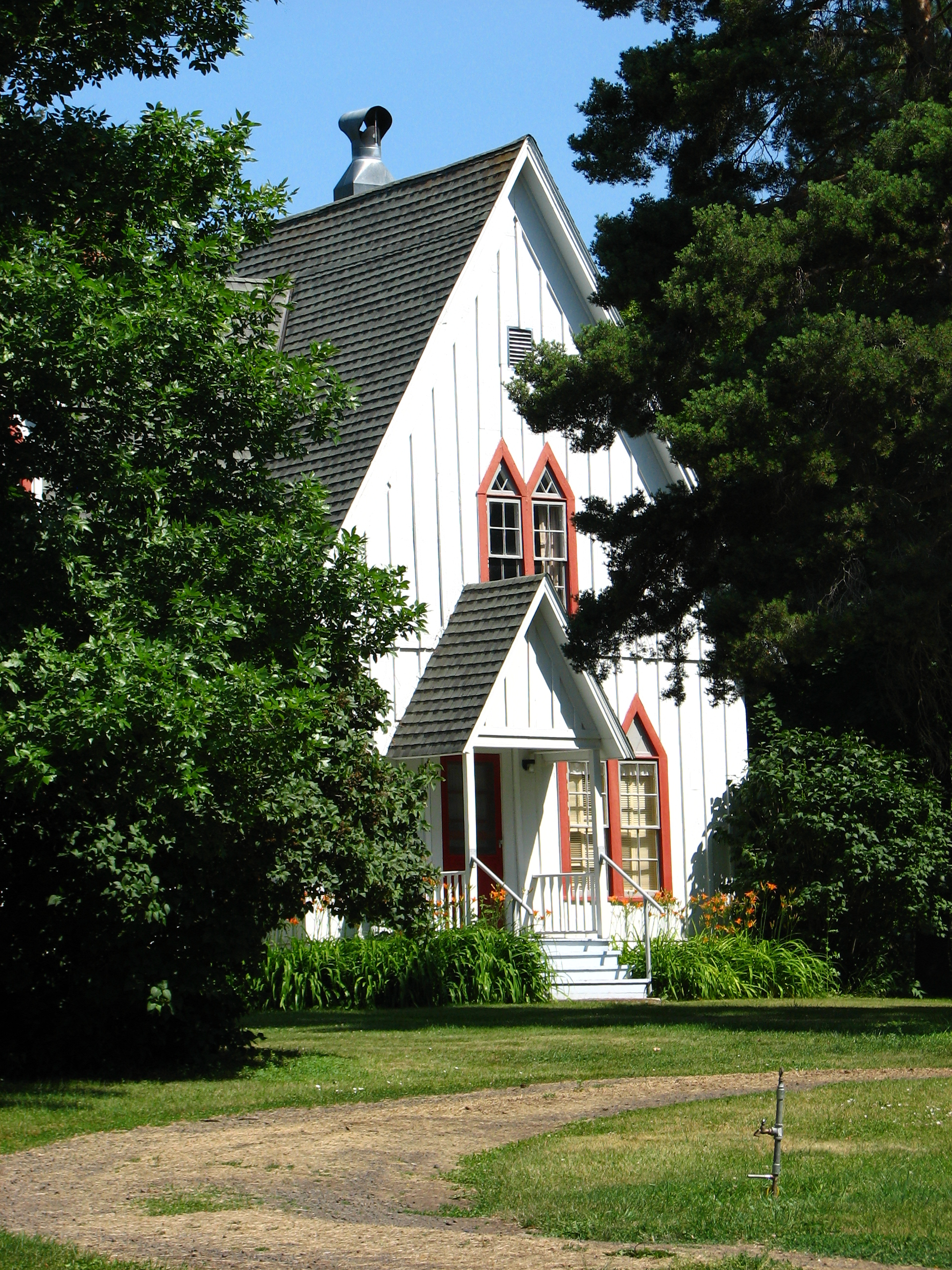
- Ascension Episcopal Rectory in 2009
- Location: Church Street; Cove, Oregon
- Coordinates: 45°17′52″N 117°48′47″W
- Area: 2 acres (0.81 ha)
- Built: 1874–1875 (church); 1876 (rectory)
- Architect: Pattern book (attributed)
- Architectural style: Gothic Revival
- NRHP reference No.: 74001718
- Added to NRHP: December 3, 1974

The Ascension Episcopal Church and Rectory (built (1874–76) are a historic church building and associated clergy house in Cove, Oregon, United States.

The church and rectory were listed on the National Register of Historic Places in 1974. As of 2014, the buildings form part of the Ascension School Camp and Conference Center, operated by the Episcopal Diocese of Eastern Oregon.

== See also ==
- National Register of Historic Places listings in Union County, Oregon
