= KUBQ =

- La Grande, Oregon; United States
- Frequency: 98.7 MHz
- Branding: 98.7 The Ranch

Programming
- Format: Country

Ownership
- Owner: Pacific Empire Radio Corporation
- Sister stations: KBKR; KBKR-FM; KLBM; KRJT

History
- First air date: August 15, 1977 (as KLBM-FM at 98.3)
- Former call signs: KLBM-FM (1977–1985); KKUC (1985–1990)
- Former frequencies: 98.3 MHz (1977–1993)

Technical information
- Licensing authority: FCC
- Facility ID: 24796
- Class: C2
- ERP: 2,250 watts
- HAAT: 592 meters (1,942 ft)
- Transmitter coordinates: 45°26′26″N 117°53′31″W

Links
- Public license information: Public file; LMS
- Webcast: Listen live
- Website: 987theranch.com

KUBQ (98.7 FM, "The Ranch") is a radio station licensed to serve La Grande, Oregon, in the United States of America. The station is owned by the Pacific Empire Radio Corporation. KUBQ broadcasts a country music format to eastern Oregon.

All five stations owned and operated by Pacific Empire Radio Corporation, in Eastern Oregon, share a radio studio building in La Grande, Oregon, located at 2510 Cove Ave.

== History ==
In November 1984, KLBM, Inc., reached an agreement to sell KLBM-FM to Grande Radio, Inc. The deal was approved by the FCC on January 7, 1985, and the transaction was consummated on June 24, 1988.

The station was assigned the KUBQ call sign by the Federal Communications Commission on June 4, 1990.

On July 1, 2019, KUBQ changed its format from rock to country, branded as "98.7 The Ranch".
