= Elgin Opera House =

- Elgin City Hall and Opera House
- U.S. National Register of Historic Places
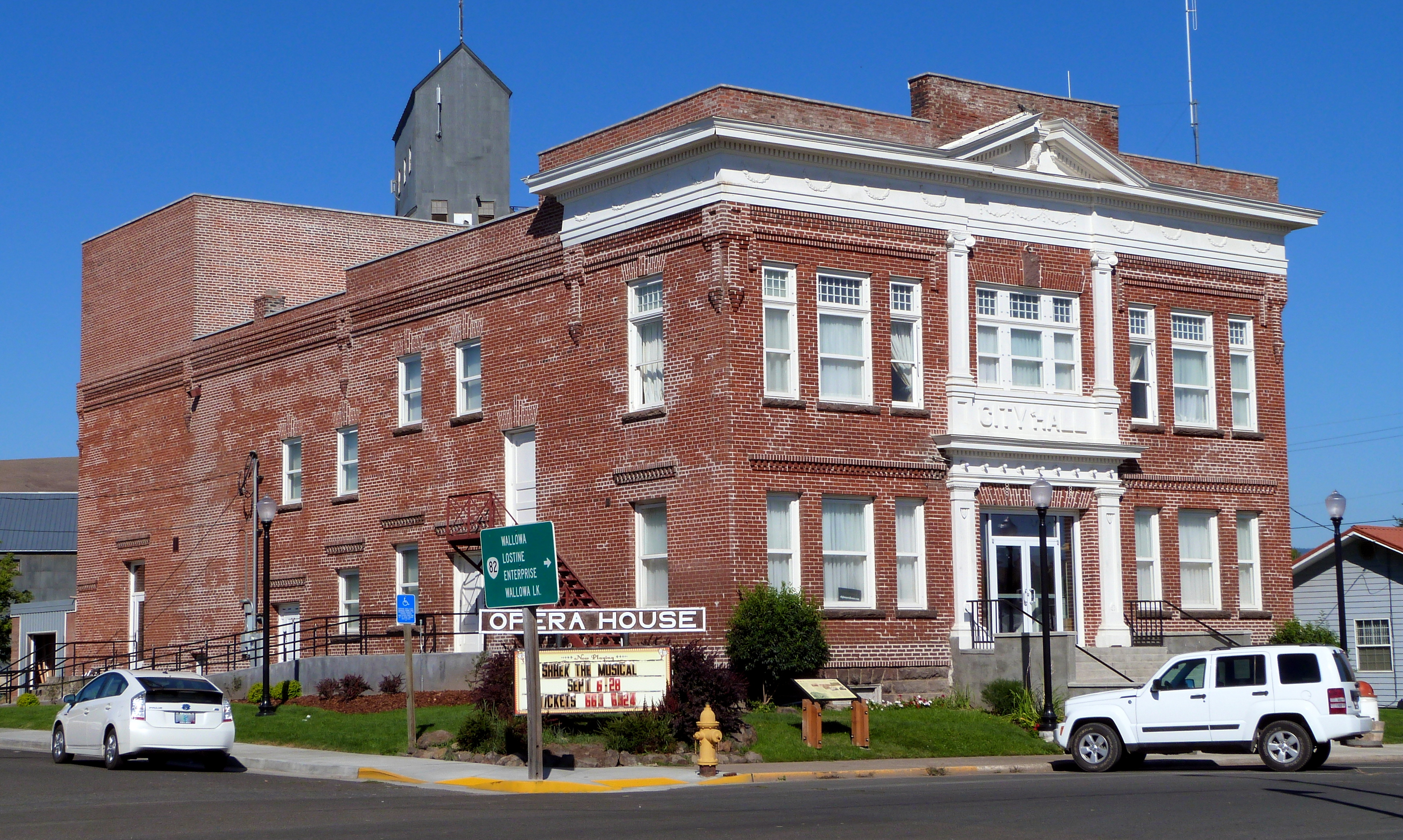
- The building's exterior in 2013

- Location within Oregon Location within the United States
- Location: Albany and N. 8th Sts., Elgin, Oregon
- Coordinates: 45°33′56.7″N 117°55′3.8″W
- Area: 0.6 acres (0.24 ha)
- Built: 1912
- Architect: Slater, John
- Architectural style: American Renaissance
- NRHP reference No.: 80003383
- Added to NRHP: October 10, 1980

The Elgin Opera House, located at 100 North 8th Street in Elgin, Oregon, United States, is listed (under the name Elgin City Hall and Opera House) on the National Register of Historic Places.

== See also ==
- National Register of Historic Places listings in Union County, Oregon
