= Idaho Northern and Pacific Railroad =

Railroad in Idaho and Oregon, U.S.

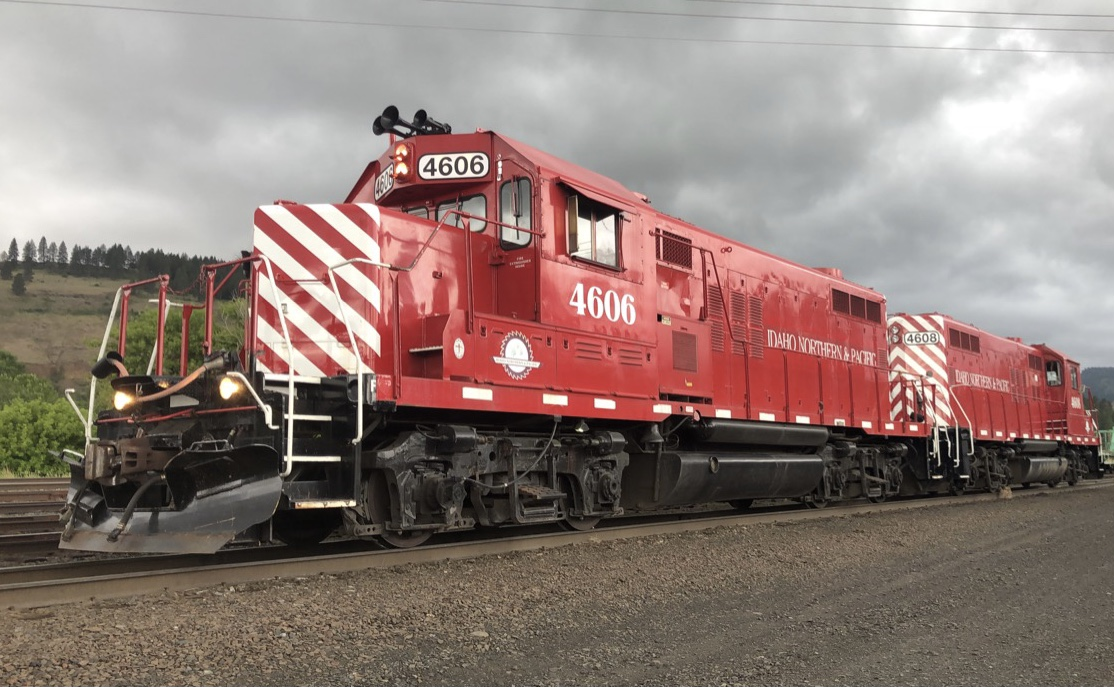
- INPR 4606 and 4608 La Grande Oregon (2021)

Overview
- Headquarters: Emmett, Idaho
- Reporting mark: INPR
- Locale: Idaho, Oregon
- Dates of operation: 1993–present

Technical
- Track gauge: 4 ft 8 1/2 in (1,435 mm) standard gauge

Other
- Website: rgpc.com/railroads/idaho-northern-pacific-railroad/

The Idaho Northern and Pacific Railroad (reporting mark: INPR) is a small railroad in southwestern Idaho and eastern Oregon in the United States. It owns 120 miles (190 km) of former Union Pacific Railroad branch lines, and is a subsidiary of the Rio Grande Pacific Corp., based in Fort Worth, Texas. Idaho Northern and Pacific's offices are in Emmett, Idaho.

As of 2021, the INPR operated in two separate subdivisions, The Elgin Subdivision which operates from La Grande to Elgin (21.5 miles [34.6 km]) connecting at Elgin with another former UP rail line now owned by Wallowa County – which continues to Joseph, Oregon – and the Payette Subdivision Payette through Emmett and then into the canyon of the North Fork of the Payette River northward to Cascade. This section, known as the Thunder Mountain Subdivision is considered the most scenic stretch of the INPR. The Emmett to Cascade Thunder Mountain Subdivision was put in OOS (Out of Service) status in 2016, it has not been abandoned and remains in railroad possession with fully compliant railroad crossings and occasional maintenance.

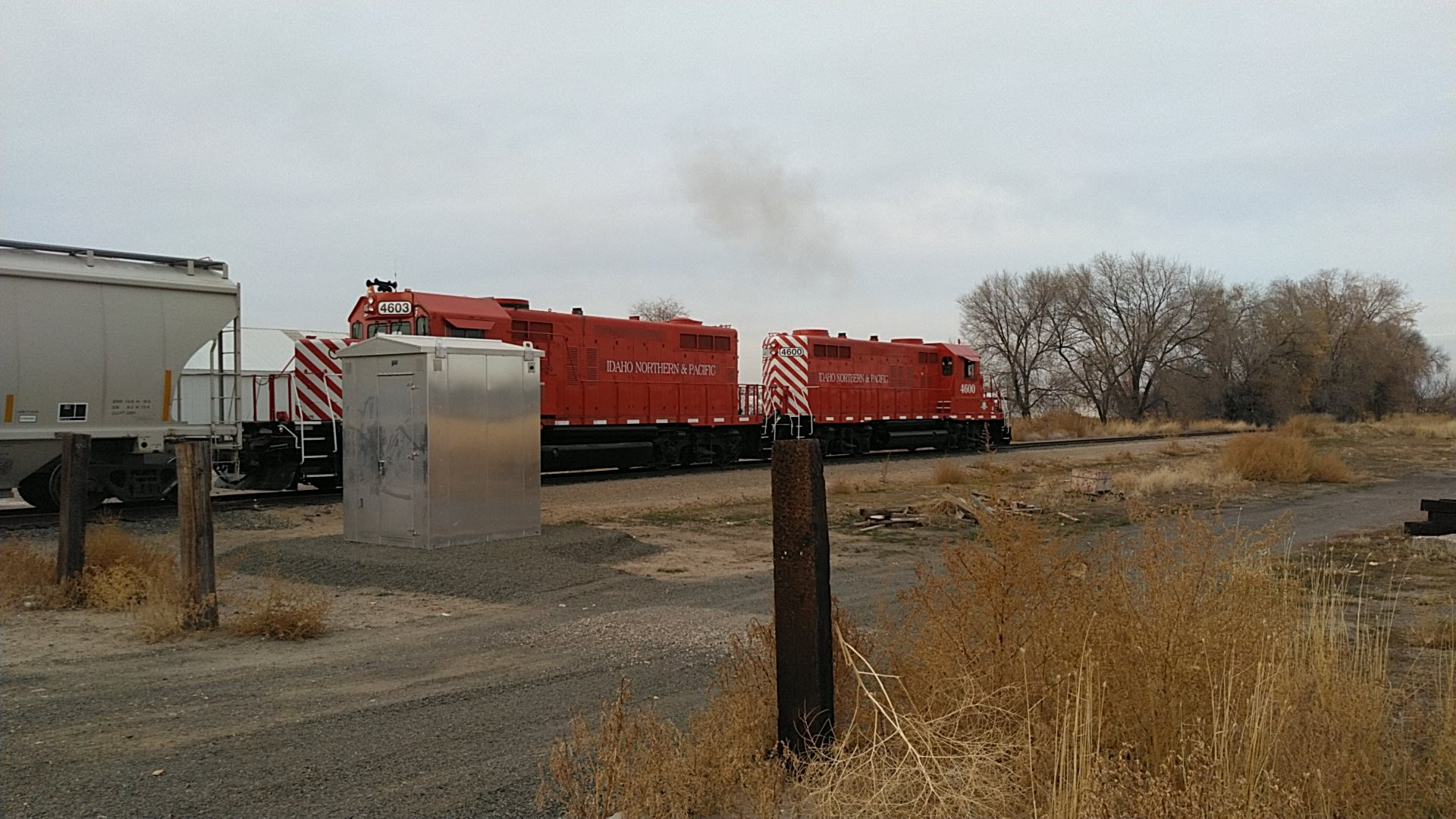
INPR GP9R in Fruitland, Idaho

== History ==
The Oregon side of the railroad was originally built by the Oregon Railroad and Navigation Company from 1888 to 1890 from La Grande, Oregon to Elgin Oregon. In 1907, it was completed out to Joseph, Oregon, now under the control of the OSL. The Idaho side of the railroad started out as the Idaho Northern Railway which was built starting in 1900 from Nampa, Idaho to Emmett, Idaho with the line later being extended in 1912 to 1914 to Smiths Ferry, Idaho and eventually McCall, Idaho. Separately from the Idaho Northern, in 1902 the Payette valley railroad built a 30-mile-long (48 km) line from Payette to Emmett, the line along with the Idaho Northern eventually came under the ownership of the Union Pacific.

In 1899, the Pacific and Idaho Northern Railway (aka P&IN Railway) was created and began construction from Weiser, Idaho to New Meadows, Idaho. It took 12 years but was completed by 1911. This line remained independent from the Union Pacific until 1936 when it was bought by the UP.

In 1980, the Union Pacific abandoned the trackage from McCall to Cascade Idaho. In 1989, the UP put all four lines for sale as part of a package sale. In 1993, they were purchased by the Rio Grande Pacific Corporation in Texas which created the Idaho Northern and Pacific Railroad to operate the lines.

In 1994, the INPR and UP reached an agreement to abandon the stretch of tracks from Nampa to Emmett, Idaho as it had been an increased fire risk in recent years. All interchanges now happened in Payette. In 1995, the INPR and UP reached an agreement to abandon the 85-mile (137 km) Weiser to Rubicon line and split the scrap money as the line had recently lost too much rail traffic to cover maintenance costs.

In 1997, the mill in Joseph, Oregon closed and the INPR initiated abandonment paperwork. This however was prevented as the counties of Wallowa and Union, Oregon, jointly bought the line from Elgin to Joseph to preserve it for future use. This line would later be used by the Wallowa Union Railroad to run the Eagle Cap excursion train.

In 2001, the Boise Cascade mill in Cascade closed. This was the last freight customer east of Emmett on the line and signaled the end of all freight service from Emmett north.

The INPR leased the UP Boise Branch connecting Boise, Idaho with the Union Pacific main line at Nampa as well as the Wilder branch line from Caldwell, Idaho to Wilder, Idaho starting in 1999 and continuing until 2009. However, the Boise Valley Railroad took over operation in 2009, possibly as a result of the post-housing boom recession.

From 1998 until January 2016, the INPR operated the Thunder Mountain Line, a tourist railroad between Horseshoe Bend and Cascade. The Thunder Mountain Line offered scenic tours, dinner trains and "river and rail" trips along the Payette River that allowed people to ride a train north and return southward by river raft on the Payette. In 2014, the railroad started the brief Payette River flyer operation using 2 Budd RDC cars purchased from the Wallowa Union Railroad in Oregon; this operation ceased in 2016 as well.
