= Oregon Route 203 =

State highway in northeastern Oregon, US

Oregon Route 203
- Route 203 highlighted in red

Route information
- Maintained by ODOT
- Length: 49.23 mi (79.23 km)
- Existed: 1935–present

Major junctions
- South end: I-84 in Baker City
- OR 237 in Union
- North end: I-84 / US 30 in La Grande

Location
- Country: United States
- State: Oregon
- Counties: Baker, Union

Highway system
- Oregon Highways; Interstate; US; State; Named; Scenic
← OR 202	→ OR 204

Oregon Route 203 is an Oregon state highway running from Interstate 84 near La Grande to I-84 near Baker City. OR 203 is composed of part of the La Grande-Baker Highway No. 66 (see Oregon highways and routes) and the Medical Springs Highway No. 340. It is a combined 49.23 miles (79.23 km) long and runs north–south.

== Route description ==
OR 203 begins at an intersection with I-84 and U.S. Route 30 near La Grande. It heads southeast through Hot Lake to Union, where it overlaps OR 237 for 0.58 miles (0.93 km). After the concurrency ends, OR 203 continues southeast to Medical Springs, then turns south, southwest, and west to an intersection with I-84 near Baker City, where it ends.

The official description of OR 203 indicates that it ends at an intersection with OR 86 near Baker City. Current Department of Transportation charts, however, suggest that this description is outdated.

== History ==
Highway 203 was first opened in 1935. Over the decades that followed, various sections of Catherine Creek southeast of Union were channelized to avoid impinging on the roadway. This area of Catherine Creek has recently been the focus of restoration efforts, since some sections support high populations of threatened anadromous fish.

== Major intersections ==
County	Location	mi	km	Destinations	Notes
Baker	Baker City	0.00	0.00	I-84 east – Ontario; OR 86 – Baker City, Richland	Southern end of I-84 overlap
Baker		4.03	6.49	I-84 west – Pendleton	Northern end of I-84 overlap
Union	Union	42.33	68.12	OR 237 south – North Powder, Baker City	Southern end of OR 237 overlap
Union	Union	42.91	69.06	OR 237 north – Cove	Northern end of OR 237 overlap
Union	La Grande	53.18	85.58	I-84 / US 30 – Baker City, Pendleton	Roadway continues as westbound US 30
1.000 mi = 1.609 km; 1.000 km = 0.621 mi: Concurrency terminus
