= La Grande, Oregon =

- City
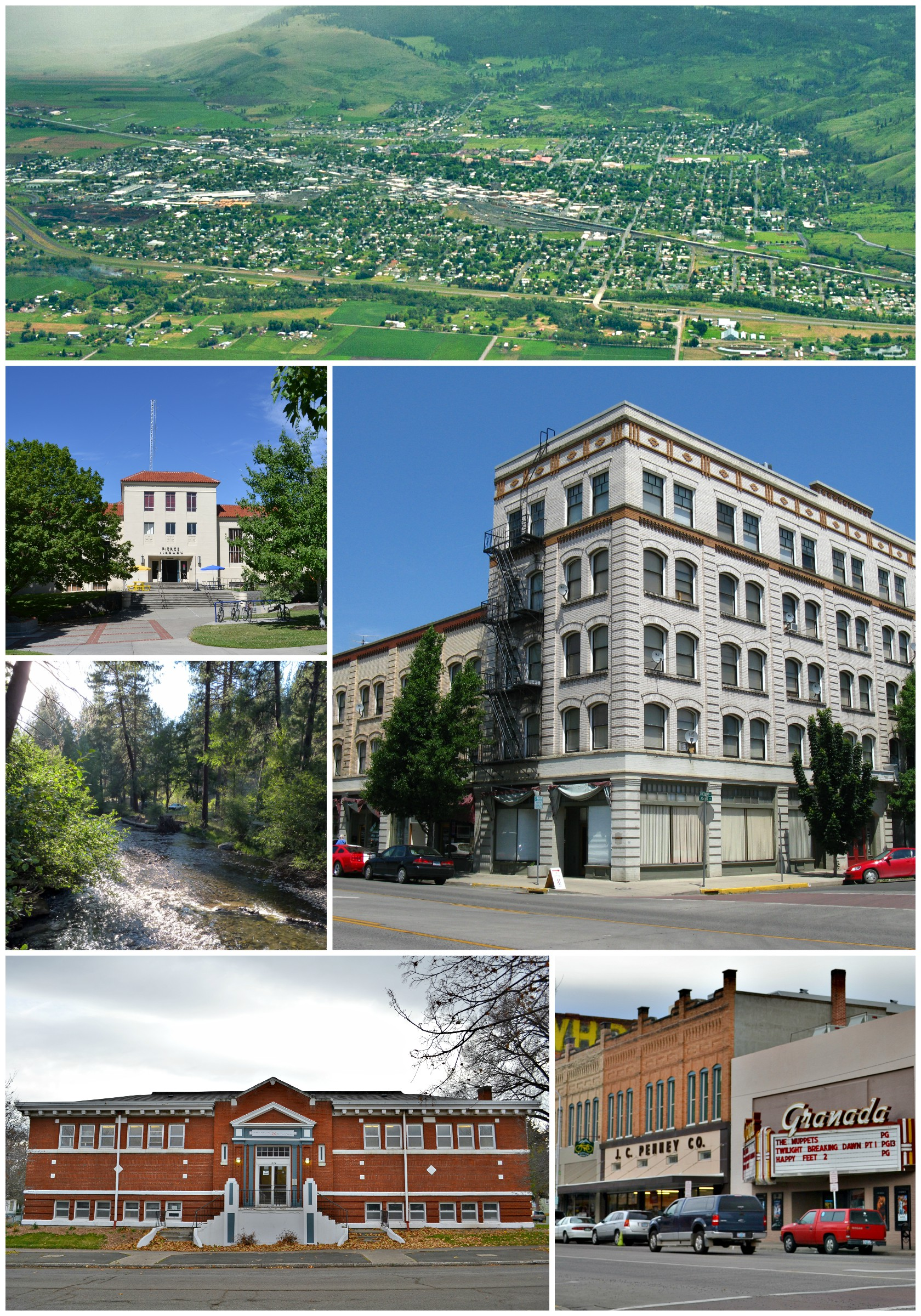
- Clockwise: Aerial view of the city; the Foley Building; the Granada theater; Carnegie Library; Catherine Creek; Eastern Oregon University Pierce Library
- Motto: The Hub of Northeast Oregon
- Location in Oregon
- Coordinates: 45°19′27″N 118°05′12″W
- Country: United States
- State: Oregon
- County: Union
- Incorporated: 1865

Government
  - Mayor: Justin Rock (R)

Area
  - Total: 4.59 sq mi (11.89 km^{2})
  - Land: 4.58 sq mi (11.87 km^{2})
  - Water: 0.012 sq mi (0.03 km^{2})
- Elevation: 2,772 ft (845 m)

Population (2020)
  - Total: 13,026
  - Density: 2,842.8/sq mi (1,097.61/km^{2})
- Time zone: UTC−8 (Pacific)
  - Summer (DST): UTC−7 (Pacific)
- ZIP code: 97850
- Area codes: 458 and 541
- FIPS code: 41-40350
- GNIS feature ID: 2411568
- Website: City Of La Grande Website

La Grande (/ləˈɡrænd/) is a city in and the county seat of Union County, Oregon, United States. La Grande is Union County's largest city, with a population of 13,026 at the time of the 2020 U.S. Census. The La Grande micropolitan population is 25,076. It is the 16th largest metro or micropolitan area in Oregon.

La Grande is located on the western margin of the Grande Ronde Valley that is bounded by the Blue Mountains and Wallowa Mountains. These mountains and the Grande Ronde River offer abundance of natural resources and wildlife. Initially a logging and agriculture town, it has become a sports and recreation destination.

It is the hub for surrounding communities offering outdoor recreation, shopping centers and entertainment. La Grande is known for its theater and arts as the downtown area boasts Liberty Theater and the Elgin Opera House often has local showings. La Grande also is a college town with a student population of 2,825 at Eastern Oregon University.

== History ==
Originally named "Brownsville," it was forced to change its name because that name was being used for a city in Linn County. Located in the Grande Ronde Valley, the city's name comes from an early French settler, Charles Dause, who often used the phrase "La Grande" to describe the area's beauty. The population was 13,082 at the 2010 census. It is the county seat of Union County. La Grande lies east of the Blue Mountains and southeast of Pendleton.

=== Early settlement ===
The Grande Ronde Valley had long been a waypoint along the Oregon Trail. The first permanent settler in the La Grande area was Benjamin Brown in 1861. Not long after, the Leasey family and about twenty others settled there. The settlement was originally named after Ben Brown as Brown's Fort, Brown's Town, or Brownsville. There was already a Brownsville in Linn County, so when the post office was established in 1863, a more distinctive name was needed. It was decided to use "La Grande", a phrase used by a Frenchman, Charles Dause, to describe the area's scenic splendor. Before the post office was established, William Currey charged 50 cents a letter to carry the mail on horseback to and from the nearest post office, in Walla Walla, Washington. La Grande was incorporated as a city in 1865, and platted in 1868.

=== Growth ===
La Grande grew rapidly during the late 1860s and early 1870s, partially because of the region's many gold mines and the valley's agricultural capabilities. The early business establishments centered on C Avenue between present day Fourth Street and the hillside on the west end.

In 1884, the railroad came to the flat slightly east of "Old Town". This helped the town to grow and gave rise to "New Town", centered on Adams Avenue and built parallel to the railroad tracks.

By 1900, La Grande's population was 2,992, representing half of the population of Baker City.

La Grande's Eastern Oregon University, formerly known as Eastern Oregon State College, began in 1929 as Eastern Oregon Normal School, a teachers college.

=== Sugar factory ===
La Grande had a factory for processing sugar beets into raw sugar. The sugar beets came from the nearby Mormon town of Nibley, Oregon, and both were owned by the Oregon Sugar Company. R. Doerstling, the superintendent of the factory in 1899, reported seeing a Native American teepee built out of used cloth filters from the factory.

== Geography ==
According to the United States Census Bureau, the city has a total area of 4.61 square miles (11.94 km^{2}), of which 4.58 square miles (11.86 km^{2}) is land and 0.03 square miles (0.08 km^{2}) is water. The town is a major hub in the valley. Mount Emily is a Grande Ronde Valley landmark towering over the city of La Grande to the north. It often features prominently on logos of local organizations and is matched on the other side of the valley by a similar landmark, Mount Harris.

=== Climate ===
Under the Köppen climate classification system, La Grande features a warm-summer Mediterranean climate (Köppen Csb), closely bordering on a hot-summer Mediterranean climate (Köppen Csa). This climate type is characterized by warm, dry summers and cold winters.

Climate data for La Grande, Oregon (1991–2020 normals, extremes 1965–present)
Month	Jan	Feb	Mar	Apr	May	Jun	Jul	Aug	Sep	Oct	Nov	Dec	Year
Record high °F (°C)	61 (16)	66 (19)	79 (26)	88 (31)	95 (35)	108 (42)	108 (42)	106 (41)	103 (39)	89 (32)	71 (22)	62 (17)	108 (42)
Mean daily maximum °F (°C)	39.3 (4.1)	44.0 (6.7)	51.6 (10.9)	58.7 (14.8)	67.8 (19.9)	74.9 (23.8)	86.2 (30.1)	87.0 (30.6)	77.3 (25.2)	62.4 (16.9)	47.7 (8.7)	38.7 (3.7)	61.3 (16.3)
Daily mean °F (°C)	31.9 (−0.1)	35.4 (1.9)	41.1 (5.1)	47.0 (8.3)	55.2 (12.9)	61.8 (16.6)	70.3 (21.3)	69.9 (21.1)	61.0 (16.1)	49.0 (9.4)	38.8 (3.8)	31.5 (−0.3)	49.4 (9.7)
Mean daily minimum °F (°C)	24.6 (−4.1)	26.8 (−2.9)	30.6 (−0.8)	35.2 (1.8)	42.5 (5.8)	48.7 (9.3)	54.5 (12.5)	52.8 (11.6)	44.8 (7.1)	35.6 (2.0)	30.0 (−1.1)	24.4 (−4.2)	37.5 (3.1)
Record low °F (°C)	−17 (−27)	−10 (−23)	9 (−13)	16 (−9)	24 (−4)	22 (−6)	32 (0)	31 (−1)	23 (−5)	9 (−13)	−14 (−26)	−18 (−28)	−18 (−28)
Average precipitation inches (mm)	1.67 (42)	1.23 (31)	1.72 (44)	1.83 (46)	2.24 (57)	1.37 (35)	0.60 (15)	0.67 (17)	0.67 (17)	1.58 (40)	1.94 (49)	1.88 (48)	17.40 (442)
Average snowfall inches (cm)	3.3 (8.4)	1.0 (2.5)	0.8 (2.0)	0.1 (0.25)	0.0 (0.0)	0.0 (0.0)	0.0 (0.0)	0.0 (0.0)	0.0 (0.0)	0.0 (0.0)	1.2 (3.0)	3.0 (7.6)	9.4 (24)
Average precipitation days (≥ 0.01 in)	9.8	7.9	10.2	9.9	9.2	7.9	3.8	3.0	3.8	7.8	10.1	11.2	94.3
Average snowy days (≥ 0.1 in)	3.2	1.6	1.3	0.2	0.0	0.0	0.0	0.0	0.0	0.0	1.3	3.5	11.1
Source: NOAA

== Demographics ==
Historical population
Census	Pop.	Note	%±
1870	240		—
1880	400		66.7%
1890	2,583		545.8%
1900	2,991		15.8%
1910	4,843		61.9%
1920	6,913		42.7%
1930	8,050		16.4%
1940	7,747		−3.8%
1950	8,635		11.5%
1960	9,014		4.4%
1970	9,645		7.0%
1980	11,354		17.7%
1990	11,766		3.6%
2000	12,327		4.8%
2010	13,082		6.1%
2020	13,026		−0.4%

=== 2020 census ===
As of the 2020 census, La Grande had a population of 13,026, and the median age was 35.1 years; 21.9% of residents were under the age of 18 and 17.4% were 65 years of age or older. For every 100 females there were 94.0 males, and for every 100 females age 18 and over there were 90.4 males age 18 and over.

According to the 2020 Decennial Census Demographic and Housing Characteristics data, 99.7% of residents lived in urban areas while 0.3% lived in rural areas.

There were 5,464 households, of which 27.5% had children under the age of 18 living in them. Of all households, 39.3% were married-couple households, 20.8% were households with a male householder and no spouse or partner present, and 31.1% were households with a female householder and no spouse or partner present. About 33.4% of all households were made up of individuals and 13.7% had someone living alone who was 65 years of age or older.

There were 5,852 housing units, of which 6.6% were vacant. Among occupied housing units, 53.1% were owner-occupied and 46.9% were renter-occupied. The homeowner vacancy rate was 1.8% and the rental vacancy rate was 5.6%.

Racial composition as of the 2020 census
Race	Number	Percent
White	10,842	83.2%
Black or African American	123	0.9%
American Indian and Alaska Native	143	1.1%
Asian	145	1.1%
Native Hawaiian and Other Pacific Islander	437	3.4%
Some other race	287	2.2%
Two or more races	1,049	8.1%
Hispanic or Latino (of any race)	863	6.6%

=== 2010 census ===
As of the census of 2010, there were 13,082 people, 5,395 households, and 3,073 families living in the city. The population density was 2,856.3 inhabitants per square mile (1,102.8/km^{2}). There were 5,794 housing units at an average density of 1,265.1 per square mile (488.5/km^{2}). The racial makeup of the city was 91.3% White, 0.8% African American, 1.4% Native American, 1.1% Asian, 1.5% Pacific Islander, 1.4% from other races, and 2.5% from two or more races. Hispanic or Latino of any race were 4.6% of the population.

There were 5,395 households, of which 28.4% had children under the age of 18 living with them, 40.7% were married couples living together, 11.7% had a female householder with no husband present, 4.6% had a male householder with no wife present, and 43.0% were non-families. 32.8% of all households were made up of individuals, and 11.6% had someone living alone who was 65 years of age or older. The average household size was 2.30 and the average family size was 2.93.

The median age in the city was 32.8 years. 22.4% of residents were under the age of 18; 16% were between the ages of 18 and 24; 23.6% were from 25 to 44; 23.3% were from 45 to 64; and 14.8% were 65 years of age or older. The gender makeup of the city was 48.1% male and 51.9% female.

=== 2000 census ===
As of the census of 2000, there were 12,327 people, 5,124 households, and 2,982 families living in the city. The population density was 2,833.5 inhabitants per square mile (1,094.0/km^{2}). There were 5,483 housing units at an average density of 1,260.3 per square mile (486.6/km^{2}). The racial makeup of the city was 92.92% White, 1.26% Asian, 0.90% Pacific Islander, 0.78% Native American, 0.68% African American, 1.40% from other races, and 2.07% from two or more races. Hispanic or Latino of any race were 2.77% of the population.

There were 5,124 households, out of which 28.0% had children under the age of 18 living with them, 45.1% were married couples living together, 9.6% had a female householder with no husband present, and 41.8% were non-families. 32.2% of all households were made up of individuals, and 12.6% had someone living alone who was 65 years of age or older. The average household size was 2.32 and the average family size was 2.93.

In the city, the population was spread out, with 23.6% under the age of 18, 16.5% from 18 to 24, 23.9% from 25 to 44, 21.4% from 45 to 64, and 14.6% who were 65 years of age or older. The median age was 34 years. For every 100 females, there were 90.3 males. For every 100 females age 18 and over, there were 88.0 males.

The median income for a household in the city was $31,576, and the median income for a family was $40,508. Males had a median income of $32,746 versus $21,930 for females. The per capita income for the city was $16,550. About 8.3% of families and 15.2% of the population were below the poverty line, including 10.0% of those under age 18 and 9.0% of those age 65 or over.

== Museums and other points of interest ==
=== Commercial district ===
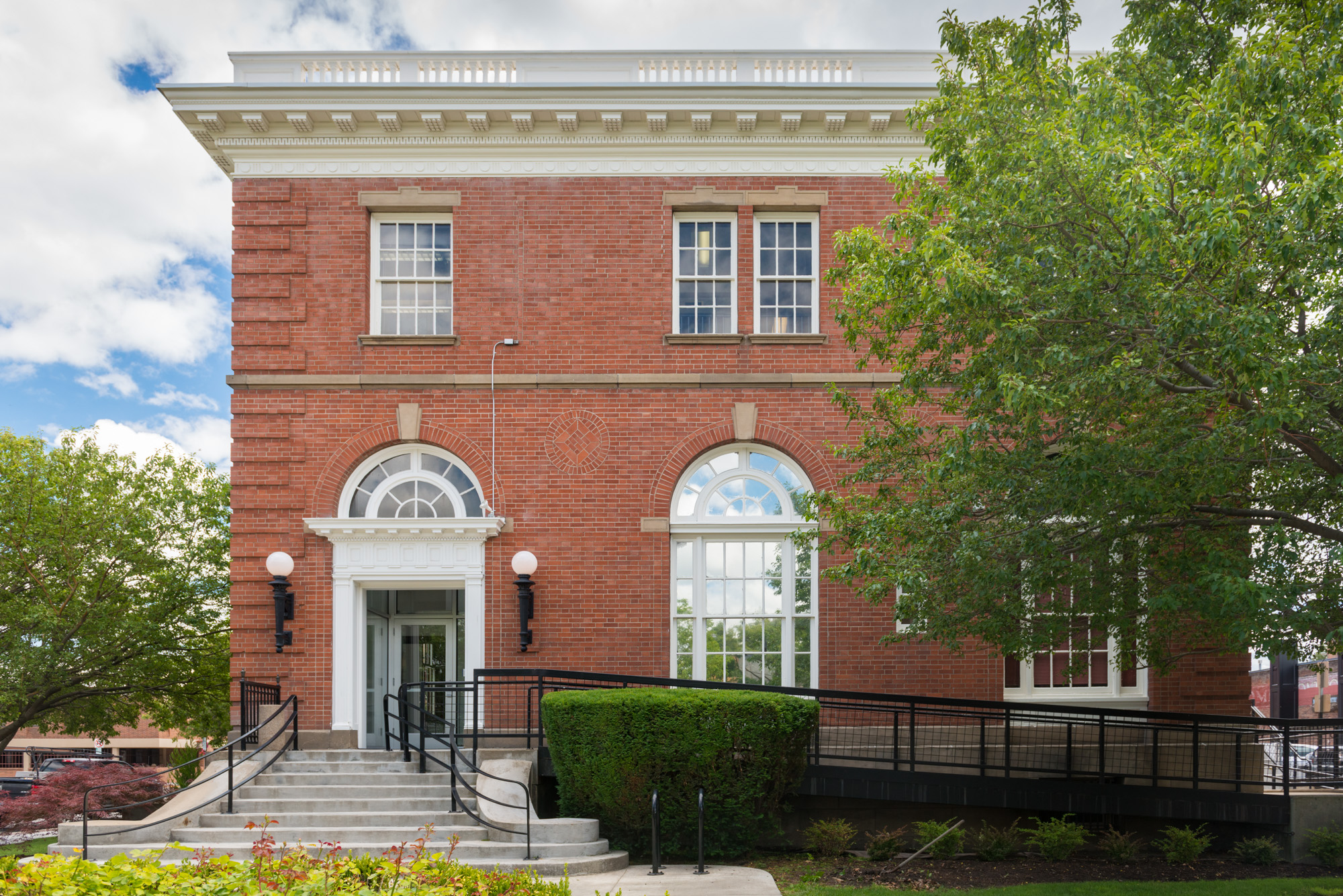
City Hall, located within the historic commercial district and formerly used as a Post Office and federal building

La Grande includes a historic commercial district listed on the National Register of Historic Places in September 2001. The 42.7-acre (17.3 ha) district is bounded by the following:

- on the northeast, by Oregon Railroad and Navigation Company/Union Pacific Railroad tracks along Jefferson Avenue;
- on the south, by Spring Avenue, Greenwood Street and Cove Avenue;
- on the southwest by Washington Avenue; and
- on the west by Fourth Street.

== Education ==
The city is served by the La Grande School District, which includes Central Elementary School, Island City Elementary, Greenwood Elementary School, La Grande Middle School, and La Grande High School. La Grande is the home of Eastern Oregon University.

== Media ==
The Observer is the local daily newspaper. Local radio stations include KLBM AM 1450 and the following stations on the FM dial: KUBQ FM 98.7, KWRL FM 102.3, KTVR FM 90.3 KCMB FM 104.7, and KRJT FM 105.9.

La Grande is considered part of the Portland television market despite its distance from the western part of the state. Independent television station KUNP (channel 16) is licensed to La Grande as a sister station to Portland ABC affiliate KATU (channel 2), though is effectively considered to be a Portland station because its former owner employed a strategy of using fringe stations to serve an entire market through cable and satellite distribution with little to no local presence (KUNP's parent company maintains a translator station serving Portland proper).

== Transportation ==
=== Highways ===
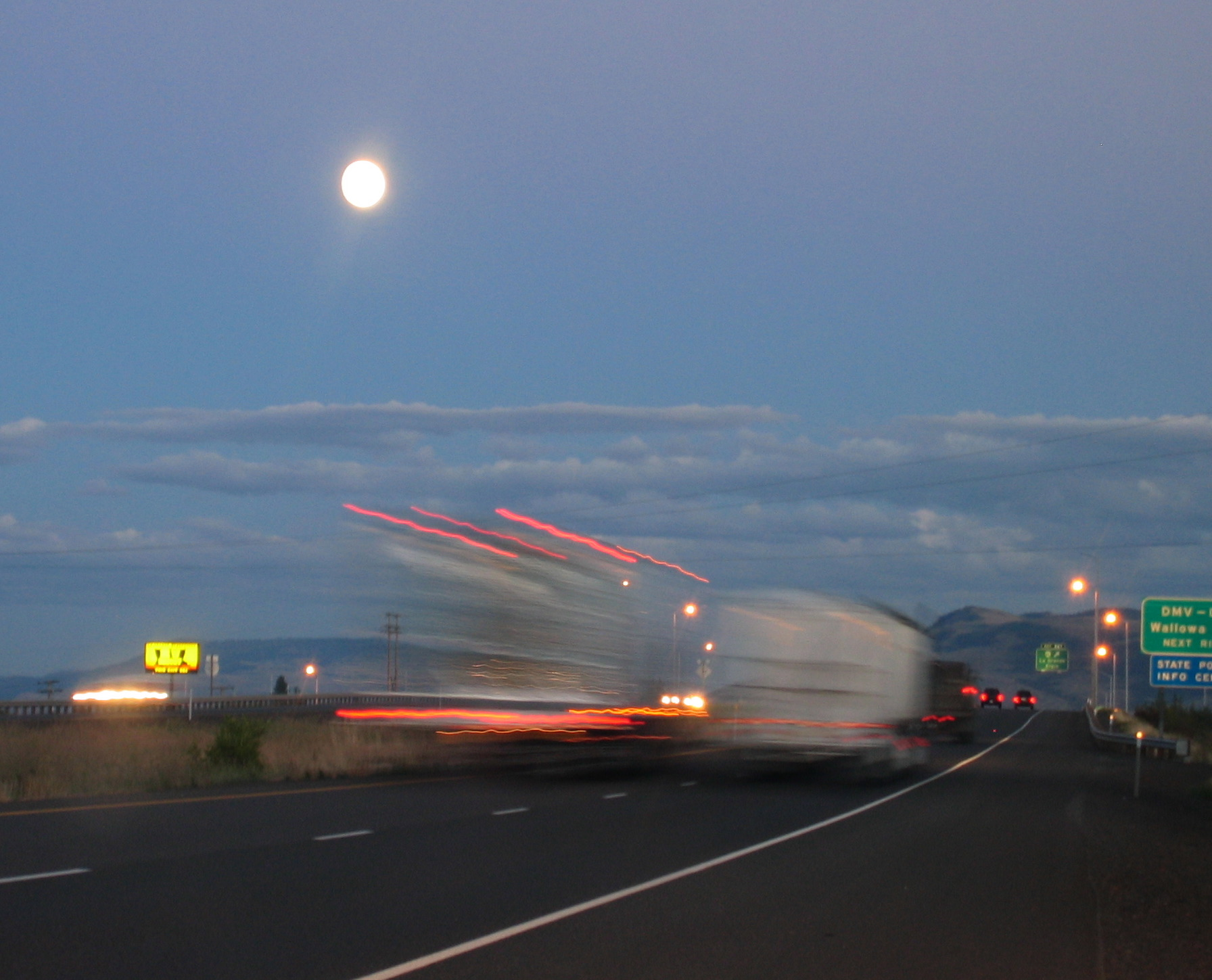
Eastbound exit 261 into La Grande off Interstate 84

- Interstate 84 is the main freeway past La Grande. It links La Grande with other nearby cities in the area (Pendleton, Baker City), as well as other regionally important cities, including Ontario, Umatilla, Portland, Boise, Idaho, and Spokane and Tri-Cities, and Seattle in Washington.
- U.S. Route 30 serves as La Grande's main street under the name of Adams Avenue.
- Oregon Route 82 begins in La Grande at its intersection with Adams Avenue. The La Grande area's portion of OR 82 is Island Avenue, commonly known as the Island City Strip because it serves as the main road to La Grande's northern suburb of Island City. OR 82 ends in Wallowa County's town of Joseph, Oregon.
- Oregon Route 237 begins in nearby Island City and is the main route to the nearby town of Cove. It ends in North Powder and joins Interstate 84 there.
- Oregon Route 203 starts southeast of La Grande, near the intersection of Interstate 84 and U.S. Route 30. It is the main route to the town of Union. It ends a few miles north of Baker City. The Highway travels through Pyles Canyon and is an alternate route to Ladd Canyon, the main route on I-84 out of the Grande Ronde Valley to the south.

=== Rail ===
La Grande is a crew change point on the Huntington and La Grande subdivisions of the Union Pacific Railroad, originally constructed through the area in 1884 by the Oregon Railway and Navigation Company. Between 1977 and 1997, the city had a station along the former route of Amtrak's Pioneer between Chicago, Salt Lake City, Portland and Seattle. The 1930-built station still exists, and is used by Union Pacific as offices. La Grande is also the junction of the Idaho Northern and Pacific Railroad's 20-mile (32 km) short line to Elgin.

=== Air ===
- La Grande/Union County Airport

== Notable people ==
- Ray Baum, Oregon state legislator, lawyer
- Jadin Bell, whose suicide helped spark national awareness of bullying
- Joe Bell, anti-bullying and suicide awareness activist, and father of Jadin Bell
- Bob Brogoitti, Oregon state legislator
- Bucky Buckwalter, former National Basketball Association coach and executive
- William De Los Santos, poet, screenwriter and film director
- Ron Gilbert, computer game designer, LucasArts adventure games
- Steve House, professional climber and mountain guide
- John F. Nugent, United States Senator from Idaho
- Jack Ward Thomas, senior research wildlife biologist, 13th Chief of the U.S. Forest Service
- Agnes Vernon, silent film actress
- Paul Wheaton, permaculture theorist, software engineer
