= Elgin, Oregon =

- City
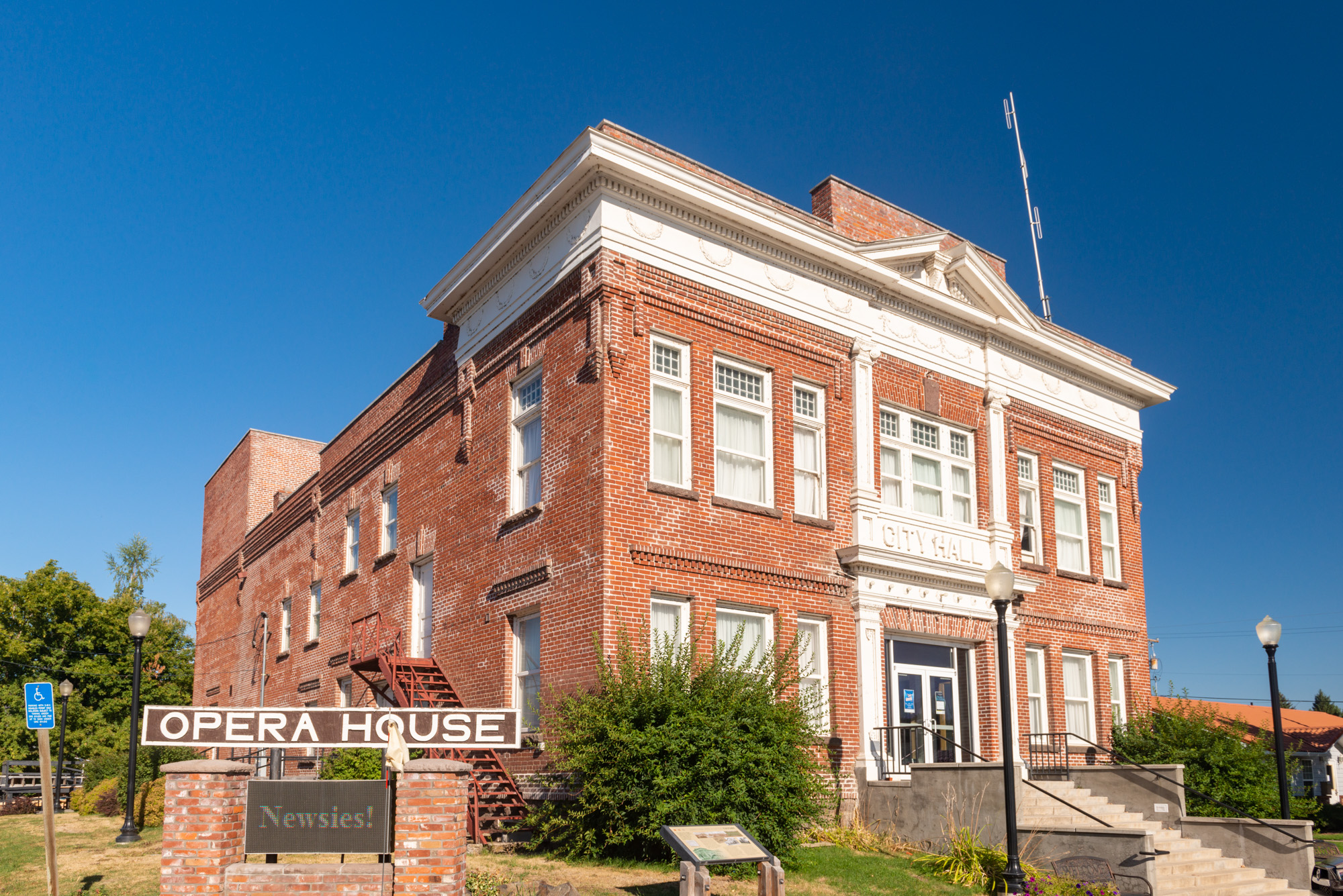
- Elgin Opera House and City Hall
- Nickname: Jewel of the Blue Mountains
- Location in Oregon
- Coordinates: 45°33′53″N 117°55′17″W
- Country: United States
- State: Oregon
- County: Union
- Incorporated: 1891

Government
  - Mayor: S. James Johnson
  - City Administrator: Alex McHaddad

Area
  - Total: 1.01 sq mi (2.62 km^{2})
  - Land: 1.01 sq mi (2.62 km^{2})
  - Water: 0 sq mi (0.00 km^{2})
- Elevation: 2,687 ft (819 m)

Population (2020)
  - Total: 1,717
  - Density: 1,698.5/sq mi (655.78/km^{2})
- Time zone: UTC-8 (Pacific)
  - Summer (DST): UTC-7 (Pacific)
- ZIP code: 97827
- Area code: 541
- FIPS code: 41-22550
- GNIS feature ID: 2410422
- Website: www.cityofelginor.org

Elgin is a city in Union County, Oregon, United States. As of the 2020 census, Elgin had a population of 1,717. The community is named after the Lady Elgin, a ship lost on Lake Michigan.

The city is known for the Elgin Opera House, originally dedicated in 1912.

== History ==
Elgin was settled by hunters, trappers, and people of all ethnic groups. Very rarely did they make the treacherous travels from nearby La Grande, because it was 120 miles away by river through the valley, which back then was covered in thick forest. (Today, La Grande and Elgin are only 20 miles away via Wallowa Lake Highway). Elgin was the gathering place for trappers and hunters to replenish their supplies. Many settlers emigrated from Walla Walla across the mountains on dog sleds. This is how Elgin became the "Elgin Huskies". Mr. Mckinnis and his family were the first settlers. He brought cattle from Illinois and moved to what was the outskirts of Elgin, and built one of the first homes. Even though his home is not set in the history in Elgin there is a letter from his wife's sister attesting to this fact. Mr. McKinnis built the mills from Elgin to La Grande and also owned all the century farms in the valley passing them down to his kin in death. He also worked in the first bank in Elgin before they moved to La Grande. Mr. McKinnis stated that this home was built in 1864.

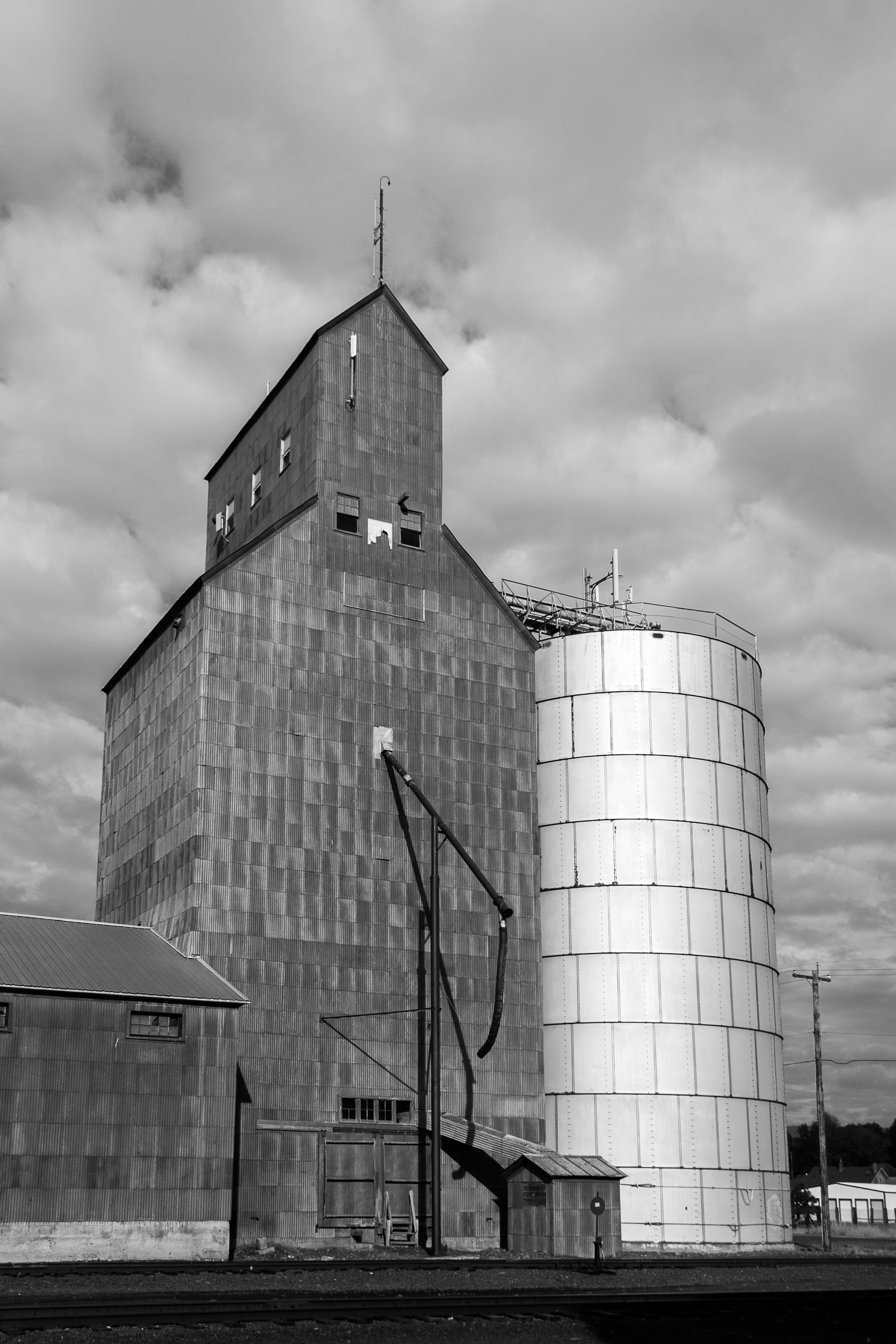
Old grain elevator in Elgin

The area of Elgin was previously called "Fish Trap" and "Indian Valley." The city was platted in 1886 following the washout of Ruckles Road over the Blue Mountains, which caused investors to leave nearby Summerville for Elgin.

By 1887 Elgin had general stores, a livery, a hotel, and a church, as well as a nearby sawmill, which continues as a more modern Boise Cascade mill. Between 1887 and 1908, the area around Elgin had 35 sawmills, most transportable water-driven whipsaws (vertical reciprocating saws). Local landowners would sell the trees for 50 cents per thousand board feet, which is about how much the sawmills could handle in a day. At the time, log transportation cost about two dollars per thousand board feet, and a mill could sell the processed lumber for $6–10 per thousand board feet.

Growth increased with the arrival of the Oregon Railway & Navigation Company railroad branch line from La Grande, Oregon in Nov. 1890. The railroad was expanded from Elgin to Wallowa, Oregon and Joseph, Oregon in 1908 by the Union Pacific Railroad. Elgin was incorporated by the Oregon Legislative Assembly on February 18, 1891.

== Geography ==
According to the United States Census Bureau, the city has a total area of 0.99 square miles (2.56 km^{2}), all of it land.

Elgin is at the junction of Oregon Route 82 and Oregon Route 204. Jubilee Lake and its campground are 19 miles (31 km) north of Elgin, in the Umatilla National Forest.

== Climate ==
This region experiences warm (but not hot) and dry summers, with no average monthly temperatures above 71.6 °F (22.0 °C). According to the Köppen Climate Classification system, Elgin has a warm-summer Mediterranean climate, abbreviated "Csb" on climate maps.

Climate data for Elgin
Month	Jan	Feb	Mar	Apr	May	Jun	Jul	Aug	Sep	Oct	Nov	Dec	Year
Record high °F (°C)	65 (18)	68 (20)	78 (26)	91 (33)	98 (37)	101 (38)	108 (42)	110 (43)	103 (39)	92 (33)	73 (23)	64 (18)	110 (43)
Mean daily maximum °F (°C)	38.1 (3.4)	44.1 (6.7)	51.8 (11.0)	60.6 (15.9)	69.3 (20.7)	76.6 (24.8)	87.1 (30.6)	86.9 (30.5)	78.1 (25.6)	64.4 (18.0)	47.6 (8.7)	39.7 (4.3)	62 (17)
Mean daily minimum °F (°C)	21.7 (−5.7)	24.6 (−4.1)	28.1 (−2.2)	32.5 (0.3)	38 (3)	43.4 (6.3)	46.4 (8.0)	44.7 (7.1)	37.9 (3.3)	31.7 (−0.2)	27.6 (−2.4)	23.7 (−4.6)	33.4 (0.8)
Record low °F (°C)	−27 (−33)	−26 (−32)	−17 (−27)	11 (−12)	17 (−8)	26 (−3)	29 (−2)	25 (−4)	19 (−7)	8 (−13)	−24 (−31)	−31 (−35)	−31 (−35)
Average precipitation inches (mm)	2.95 (75)	2.5 (64)	2.18 (55)	1.79 (45)	1.89 (48)	1.6 (41)	0.65 (17)	0.72 (18)	1 (25)	1.86 (47)	3.12 (79)	3.37 (86)	23.63 (600)
Average snowfall inches (cm)	14.8 (38)	7.4 (19)	3.2 (8.1)	0.5 (1.3)	0 (0)	0 (0)	0 (0)	0 (0)	0 (0)	0.1 (0.25)	4.6 (12)	11.3 (29)	41.9 (106)
Average precipitation days	13	12	13	11	10	9	4	5	6	9	13	13	118

== Demographics ==
Historical population
Census	Pop.	Note	%±
1890	227		—
1900	603		165.6%
1910	1,120		85.7%
1920	1,043		−6.9%
1930	728		−30.2%
1940	997		37.0%
1950	1,223		22.7%
1960	1,315		7.5%
1970	1,375		4.6%
1980	1,701		23.7%
1990	1,586		−6.8%
2000	1,654		4.3%
2010	1,711		3.4%
2020	1,717		0.4%
U.S. Decennial Census

=== 2020 census ===
As of the 2020 census, Elgin had a population of 1,717. The median age was 41.4 years. 24.8% of residents were under the age of 18 and 22.9% were 65 years of age or older. For every 100 females there were 102.5 males, and for every 100 females age 18 and over there were 96.2 males.

0% of residents lived in urban areas, while 100.0% lived in rural areas.

There were 707 households in Elgin, of which 28.4% had children under the age of 18 living in them. Of all households, 43.6% were married-couple households, 21.5% were households with a male householder and no spouse or partner present, and 26.2% were households with a female householder and no spouse or partner present. About 27.7% of all households were made up of individuals and 15.8% had someone living alone who was 65 years of age or older.

There were 762 housing units, of which 7.2% were vacant. Among occupied housing units, 65.8% were owner-occupied and 34.2% were renter-occupied. The homeowner vacancy rate was 1.3% and the rental vacancy rate was 6.9%.

Racial composition as of the 2020 census
Race	Number	Percent
White	1,446	84.2%
Black or African American	2	0.1%
American Indian and Alaska Native	16	0.9%
Asian	6	0.3%
Native Hawaiian and Other Pacific Islander	1	0.1%
Some other race	13	0.8%
Two or more races	233	13.6%
Hispanic or Latino (of any race)	68	4.0%

=== 2010 census ===
As of the census of 2010, there were 1,711 people, 714 households, and 482 families residing in the city. The population density was 1,728.3 inhabitants per square mile (667.3/km^{2}). There were 778 housing units at an average density of 785.9 per square mile (303.4/km^{2}). The racial makeup of the city was 95.3% White, 0.2% African American, 1.3% Native American, 0.2% Asian, 0.6% Pacific Islander, 1.2% from other races, and 1.3% from two or more races. Hispanic or Latino of any race were 3.3% of the population.

There were 714 households, of which 31.4% had children under the age of 18 living with them, 51.5% were married couples living together, 10.4% had a female householder with no husband present, 5.6% had a male householder with no wife present, and 32.5% were non-families. 27.3% of all households were made up of individuals, and 8.9% had someone living alone who was 65 years of age or older. The average household size was 2.40 and the average family size was 2.85.

The median age in the city was 43.9 years. 24.1% of residents were under the age of 18; 5.6% were between the ages of 18 and 24; 21.9% were from 25 to 44; 30.4% were from 45 to 64; and 17.8% were 65 years of age or older. The gender makeup of the city was 51.4% male and 48.6% female.

=== 2000 census ===
As of the census of 2000, there were 1,654 people, 638 households, and 444 families residing in the city. The population density was 1,675.9 inhabitants per square mile (647.1/km^{2}). There were 699 housing units at an average density of 708.3 per square mile (273.5/km^{2}). The racial makeup of the city was 97.16% White, 0.06% African American, 0.73% Native American, 0.06% Asian, 0.36% Pacific Islander, 1.03% from other races, and 0.60% from two or more races. Hispanic or Latino of any race were 1.33% of the population.

There were 638 households, out of which 31.8% had children under the age of 18 living with them, 55.5% were married couples living together, 11.4% had a female householder with no husband present, and 30.4% were non-families. 23.5% of all households were made up of individuals, and 10.7% had someone living alone who was 65 years of age or older. The average household size was 2.58 and the average family size was 3.06.

In the city, the population was spread out, with 28.4% under the age of 18, 7.6% from 18 to 24, 25.2% from 25 to 44, 23.8% from 45 to 64, and 15.1% who were 65 years of age or older. The median age was 36 years. For every 100 females, there were 98.3 males. For every 100 females age 18 and over, there were 94.3 males age 18 and over.

The median income for a household in the city was $31,449, and the median income for a family was $35,529. Males had a median income of $31,250 versus $17,500 for females. The per capita income for the city was $14,861. About 8.8% of families and 14.2% of the population were below the poverty line, including 22.5% of those under age 18 and 9.3% of those age 65 or over.

== Education ==
Served by Elgin School District 23. Union County is not in the boundary of any community college district.

== Notable people ==
- Earl Avery Thompson, inventor of the manual transmission synchronizer in 1923 and leader of the team at General Motors Corporation that developed the first Hydramatic automatic transmission in 1940.
- Byron "By" Speece, major league baseball player, 1924 World Series Champions playing for the Washington Senators.
