= Grande Ronde massacre =

Massacre in Northeast Oregon in 1855

The Grande Ronde Massacre, also known as The Battle of the Grande Ronde, was a significant event that took place in northeast Oregon Territory on July 17, 1856, in what is now Union County. It involved an assault by 175 mounted volunteer soldiers on a Native American village inhabited by Walla Walla, Umatilla, and Cayuse families near present-day Elgin and Summerville, Oregon. While the exact number of casualties among men, women, and children is unknown, the assault is recognized as the deadliest military-Native conflict in Oregon during the Indian Wars. The attack resulted in the destruction of approximately 120 lodges and the loss of an estimated 150 horse loads of food and equipment, with over 200 horses captured. The volunteer army suffered four deaths and four injuries during the incident.

== Background ==
The Grande Ronde Massacre was a component of the conflict against tribes of the Columbia Plateau, who had killed miners and white emigrants in retaliation in what is now eastern Washington State. This series of conflicts between white settlers and natives prompted Washington Territorial Governor Isaac I. Stevens to direct Volunteer Lieutenant Colonel Benjamin F. Shaw to pursue the combatant tribes in the region. In response, Shaw led a war party consisting of 175 mounted volunteer soldiers as part of the broader Yakima War of 1855-1868.

The Yakima War emerged as a result of escalating tensions following the imposition of treaties that compelled various tribes in southeast Washington Territory to cede their lands. These treaties, coupled with the incursion of prospectors into established tribal territories in search of gold, further fueled hostility between regional tribes and white settlers. The Yakima War, which lasted from 1855 to 1858, is also known as the Plateau War or Yakima Indian War. Chief Kamiakin (1800–1877), a leader of the Yakama, Palouse, and Klickitat peoples east of the Cascade Mountains in what is now southeastern Washington state, played a prominent role in the Yakima War. Disturbed by threats from Territorial Governor Isaac Stevens and the imposition of land cession treaties, Kamiakin forged alliances with 14 other tribes and leaders, leading to the outbreak of hostilities in 1855.

By the summer of 1865, tensions between white settlers and Native Americans west of the Cascade Mountains had eased. However, Washington Territorial Governor Isaac I. Stevens (1818-1862) and U.S. Army Colonel George Wright (1803-1865) were both determined to address the ongoing conflict with the remaining warring tribes east of the Cascade Mountains, particularly Chief Kamiakin and his camp. Yet, despite this common goal, the two officials held contrasting views on Indian policy. Governor Stevens advocated for a policy of assimilation, seeking to force the tribes onto reservations and assimilate them into white ways of life. In contrast, Colonel Wright favored a policy of separation, aiming to keep the tribes away from settlements and allow them to maintain their traditional lifestyles.

Governor Stevens had raised hundreds of settler volunteers to suppress the hostile native tribes, but he refused to place them under the command of Army Colonel George Wright, opting to maintain control over his own military operations. Colonel Wright, on the other hand, believed that the ongoing Indian conflicts were exacerbated by the conduct of undisciplined amateur volunteers who failed to distinguish between friendly, neutral, and hostile tribes.

In the summer of 1856, in response to Governor Stevens' directives, Volunteer Lieutenant Colonel Benjamin F. Shaw led a force to the Walla Walla Valley with the objective of locating and suppressing hostile natives in the southeast region of Washington Territory. Chief Kamiakin was their primary target. However, Shaw's efforts to locate Kamiakin were unsuccessful. While in Walla Walla, Shaw heard of a large encampment of Indians on the Grande Ronde River. Consequently, Shaw redirected his focus toward finding hostile tribes in the Grande Ronde Valley of the Oregon Territory. It was there that they encountered a large village inhabited by members of the Cayuse, Umatilla, and Walla Walla tribes.

== Massacre on the Grande Ronde River ==
Upon their arrival in the Grande Ronde Valley, Volunteer Lieutenant Colonel Benjamin F. Shaw and his 175 mounted soldiers made contact with the native village situated along the Grande Ronde River near present-day Summerville and Elgin, Oregon. As the military force approached, villagers began to pack up, while some men from the village rode out on horses to meet them. Shaw sent a Nez Perce scout to parley with several mounted men from the village. However, the scout returned to Shaw and his men, shouting that he had been threatened. According to Shaw, the Indians had dangled a white man's scalp and threatened to shoot the scout.

Interpreting the villagers' actions as hostile, Shaw ordered an immediate attack on the village. The mounted soldiers stormed the village, brandishing revolvers.

As the attack commenced, villagers scattered into the brush along the Grande Ronde River, with some fleeing downstream, which was interpreted by Shaw as a potential ambush. In the ensuing chaos, the villagers were subjected to a relentless onslaught, resulting in widespread slaughter. Shaw later reported, 'the charge was vigorous and so well sustained that they were broken, dispersed and slain before us.' According to Shaw's official written report, 'The enemy was pursued at a gallop for 15 miles' and 'most of those who fell were shot with the revolver. It is impossible to state how many of the enemy were killed.'

According to Volunteer Captain Walter DeLacy, an officer and diarist in Shaw's command, the precise number of Indians killed could not be ascertained, but he reported that '27 were counted on the ground, and we know of others to the number of 34 that were killed.' DeLacy described the relentless pursuit, stating, 'In his charge we never drew rein for 12 miles. At least 200 packs were scattered over this distance, containing all their winter provisions, furniture, mats, and in fact everything they possessed.' Furthermore, DeLacy noted, 'such was the impetuosity of the charge that many of their women even were unable to escape and were overtaken in the pursuit.' In this account, Shaw captured ‘nearly 300 horses, selected the best, and slaughtered the remainder.

Upon their return from the pursuit, DeLacy recounted, 'we burnt all of these as far as camp... we came to the Indian village, where 120 lodges were counted. It was burnt.'

== Aftermath ==
The Grande Ronde Massacre is a tragic event in the history of the Northwest region of the United States, highlighting the conflicts between settlers and Native American tribes. The massacre had significant repercussions, fueling anger among Native American tribes in the region and exacerbating existing tensions. Retaliatory raids were organized, further escalating conflict in the region.

Diplomatically, the massacre strained negotiations between Governor Stevens and tribal leaders at the Second Walla Walla Council in September. The incident tainted discussions and complicated efforts to resolve disputes.

While Governor Stevens and military officials sought to justify the attack as necessary to address perceived threats, it remains a somber reminder of the injustices endured by Native American communities during westward expansion. The Grande Ronde Massacre, with its tragic loss of life and lasting impact, serves as a poignant chapter in the complex history of settler-Native American relations in the American West.
