= Shovel Creek =

Shovel Creek may refer to:

- Shovel Creek (Alaska), a stream in Alaska
- Shovel Creek (Snake River), a stream in Washington
