= Catherine Creek =

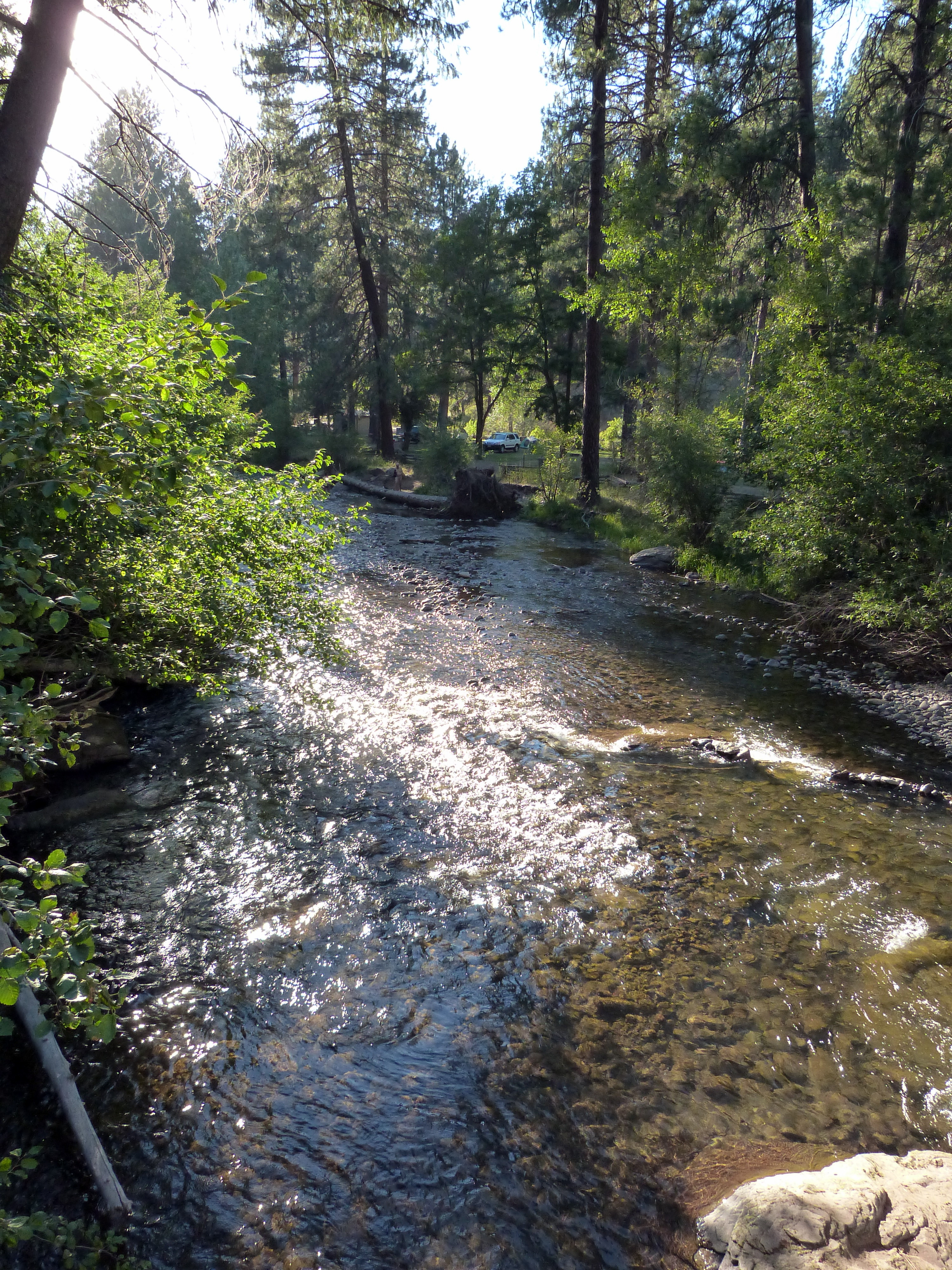
- At Catherine Creek State Park

- Location of the mouth of Catherine Creek in Oregon
- Etymology: Catherine Godley, daughter of early settlers near Union

Location
- Country: United States
- State: Oregon
- County: Union

Physical characteristics
- Source
  - location: Wallowa–Whitman National Forest
  - coordinates: 45°07′12″N 117°38′50″W
  - elevation: 3,650 ft (1,110 m)
- Mouth: Grande Ronde River
  - location: near Cove
  - coordinates: 45°18′49″N 117°52′20″W
  - elevation: 2,690 ft (820 m)
- Length: 32.4 mi (52.1 km)
- Basin size: 489 sq mi (1,270 km^{2})

Catherine Creek is a 32.4-mile-long (52.1 km) creek in northeastern Oregon, United States. A tributary of the Grande Ronde River, it is the second-longest stream in the Grande Ronde Valley. Originating in the foothills of the Wallowa Mountains, it flows generally northwest through Catherine Creek State Park and the city of Union before joining the river.

The creek was named for Catherine Godley, a daughter of Thomas and M. E. Godley, who settled near Union in the 19th century. A former variant name for the stream on some maps was Ladd Creek. However, Ladd Creek on more recent maps is a stream flowing generally northeast from hills southeast of La Grande through the Ladd Marsh Game Management Area, joining Gekeler Slough before entering Catherine Creek. Little Creek, a tributary of Catherine Creek, was formerly called Julianna Creek for the Godleys' other daughter.

== Course ==
Catherine Creek, flowing entirely within Union County, begins at the confluence of North Fork Catherine Creek and South Fork Catherine Creek in the Wallowa–Whitman National Forest. Running generally northwest from the foothills of the Wallowa Mountains along Oregon Route 203, the creek receives Scout and Milk creeks from the left, then Little Catherine Creek from the right before entering Catherine Creek State Park. Continuing northwest through the city of Union, the creek receives Pyles Creek from the left and Little Creek from the right before turning away from the highway. Meandering north across the Grande Ronde Valley, the creek receives Ladd Creek (below its confluence with Gekeler Slough) and McAlister Slough, both from the left, and Mill Creek from the right before entering the Grande Ronde River west of Cove. The larger stream is a tributary of the Snake River.

== Recreation ==
Catherine Creek is open for catch-and-release fishing for wild steelhead downstream of the Highway 203 bridge above Catherine Creek State Park. Chinook salmon frequent the creek and its forks where they flow through the national forest to about 5 miles (8 km) upstream of the state park, but they and the resident bull trout in these streams are protected from fishing. Small wild rainbow trout also inhabit the upper creek and its forks.

Catherine Creek State Park, about 8 miles (13 km) from Union, has a public campground, and camping is also permitted at a site in the national forest. The campground at the 168-acre (68 ha) state park is open from mid-April through October. The park also has picnic areas, restrooms, horseshoe pits, and hiking trails.

== See also ==
- List of rivers of Oregon
- Project Travois, a briefly-considered proposal to use nuclear explosives for a dam on Catherine Creek
