= Grande Ronde Valley =

Basin in Union County, Oregon, United States

Coordinates: 45°21′46″N 117°57′18″W

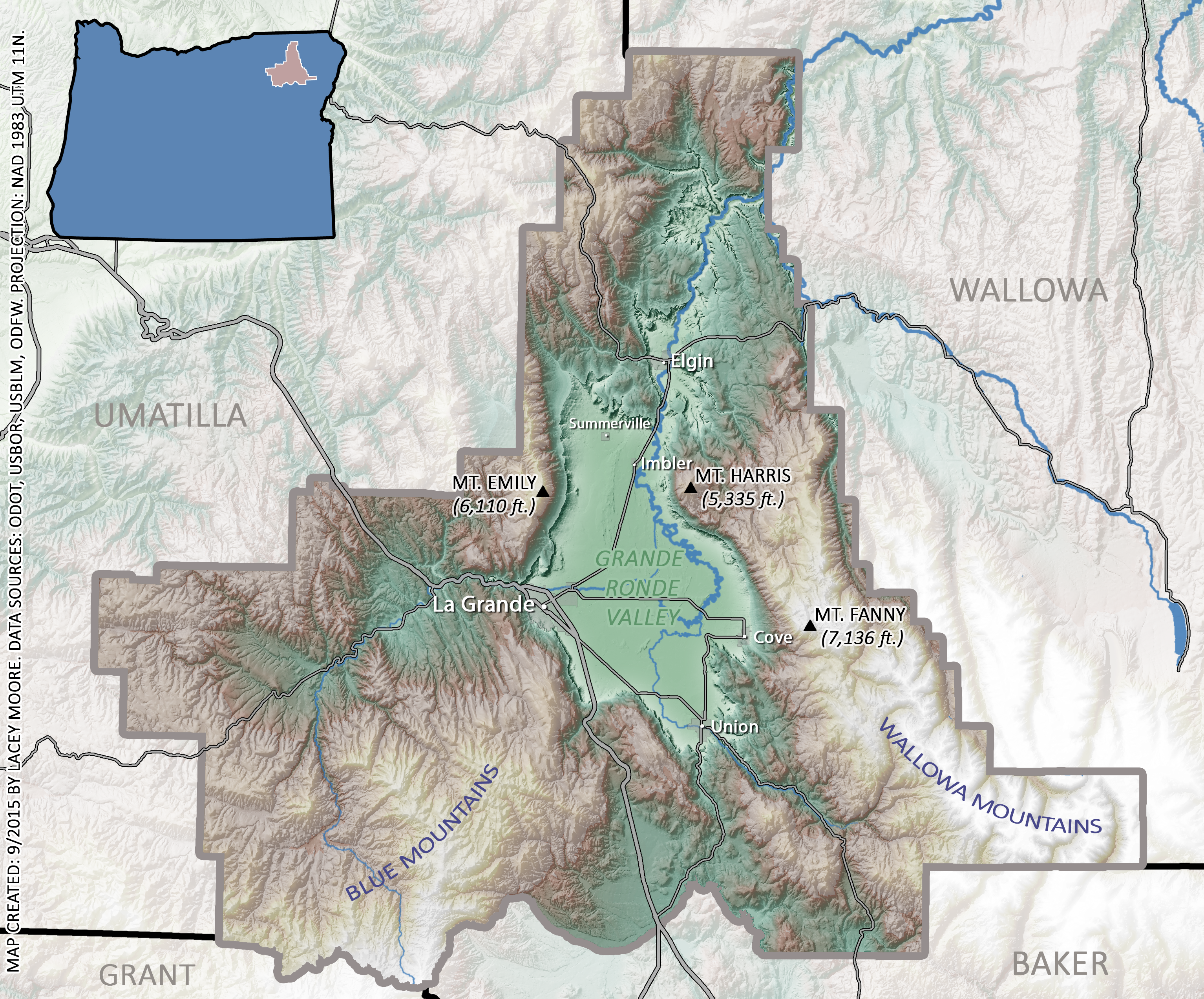
- Elevation map of Union County, with the Grande Ronde Valley featured in the center.
- Floor elevation: 820 m (2,690 ft)
- Length: 35 m (115 ft) North to South
- Width: 15 m (49 ft)

Geology
- Type: Flood basalt

Geography
- Location: Union County, Oregon, United States
- Borders on: Blue Mountains
- Rivers: Grand Ronde River

The Grande Ronde Valley is a valley in Union County in northeastern Oregon, United States. It is surrounded by the Blue Mountains and Wallowa Mountains, and is drained by the Grande Ronde River. La Grande is its largest community. The valley is 35 miles (56 km) long, north to south, from Pumpkin Ridge to Pyles Canyon, and 15 miles (24 km) wide, east to west, from Cove to the Grande Ronde River's canyon. Its name, fittingly, means, "great circle."

== Geology ==
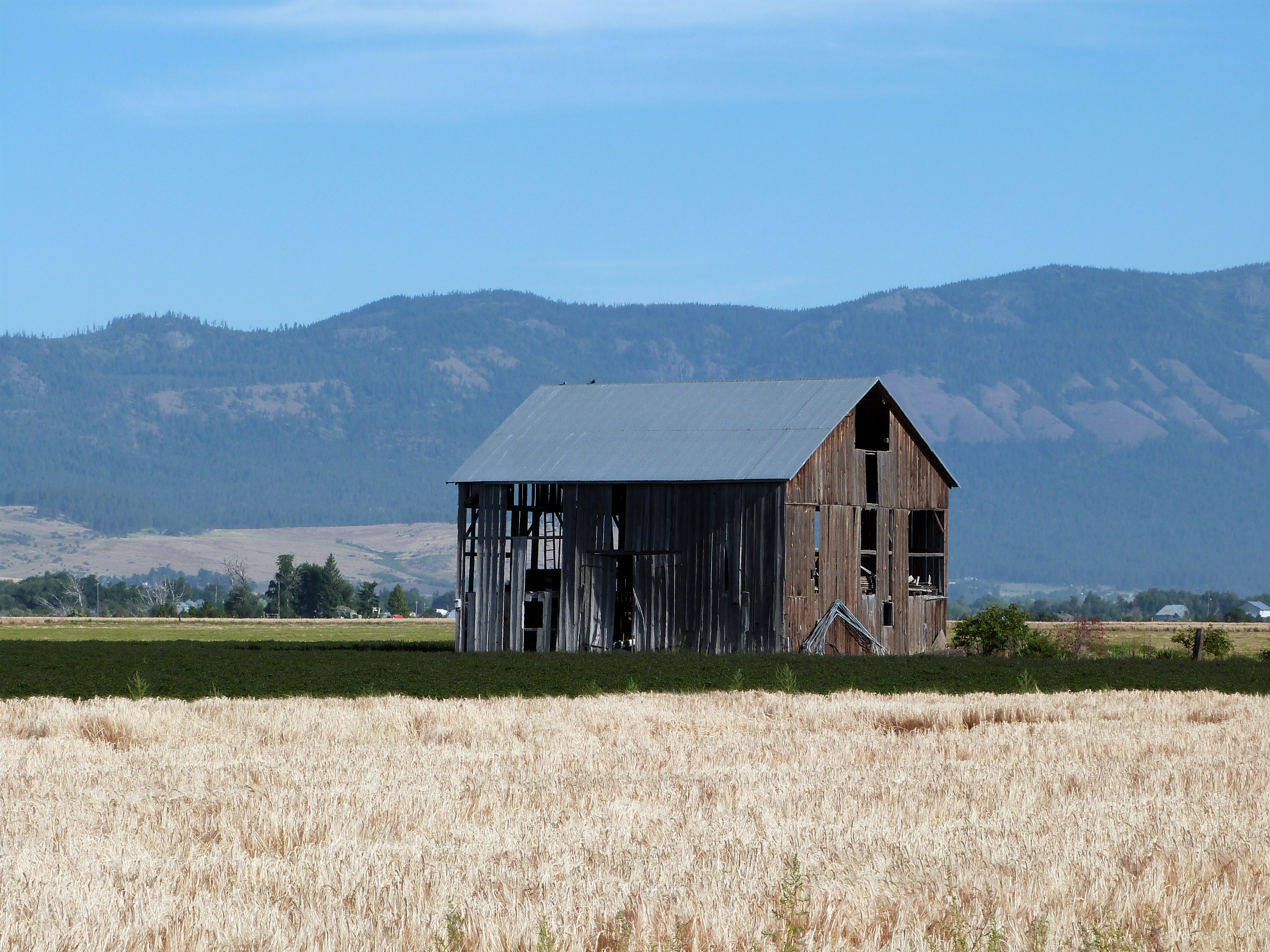
A barn in the Grande Ronde Valley, near La Grande, with the Blue Mountains in the background.

The Grande Ronde Valley is part of the Columbia River Plateau. The Columbia River Plateau was created by a series of basalt flood eruptions. These happen when a long crack in the Earth's crust spews floods of lava. The molten rock then hardens and creates layers of basalt. The Grande Ronde Valley floor began to sink from this plateau at a rate of about .07-.18 millimeters per year about nine million years ago.

== Geography ==
The Grande Ronde Valley floor is at about 2,700 feet (820 m) above sea level. Its horizon is dominated by the Blue Mountains. Eagle Cap Wilderness is to the southeast. The highest nearby mountains are Mount Fanny to the east, with an elevation of 7,136 feet (2,175 m); Mount Harris to the northeast, elevation 5,335 feet (1,626 m); and Mount Emily to the northwest, elevation 6,110 feet (1,860 m). Communities within the valley include Cove, Imbler, Island City, La Grande, Summerville, and Union. The Grande Ronde River flows through the valley; its tributaries include Catherine, Fir, Ladd, Little, Mill, Pyles, and Willow creeks.

== History ==
=== Native Americans ===
Eastern Oregon and the surrounding area was a haven for many Native American tribes. Many of these tribes, including the Nez Perce, Cayuse, Umatilla, Walla Walla, and Shoshone, would spend their summers in the bountiful Grande Ronde Valley. Here they would forage, hunt, fish, and bathe in hot springs. Tribes that may have been hostile toward each other would live together harmoniously in the "Valley of Peace".

=== First contact and permanent settlement ===
The Astor Expedition passed through the valley in 1811, and it was a waypoint along the Oregon Trail. Since the 1840s, settlers headed toward the Willamette Valley would pass through it. Every traveler who left a record of passing through the area was left with a favorable impression. Early pioneers chose not to settle in the valley, perhaps because they were intent upon reaching the Willamette Valley, it was too far from a supply base, or they feared the Native Americans in the area. The first permanent settlement in the Grande Ronde Valley was not established until 1861. The first permanent settler in the Grande Ronde Valley was Benjamin Brown, an Englishman who had originally settled in Michigan. Not long after, the Leasey family and about 20 others settled there. Serving as a travelers inn, the settlement was originally named Brown's Fort, and then Browns Town or Brownsville. Since there was already a Brownsville in Linn County, the name was changed to La Grande.

=== Growth ===
Early settlements were in the more arable northern parts of the valley, as the southern end was subject to flooding, swampy, and contained alkaline soil. In 1862, Conrad Miller settled the opposite side of the valley. This settlement grew into the city of Union, the second largest community in the Grande Ronde Valley. Island City, Cove, and Summerville were not far behind. Many factors contributed to the growth of the valley. Some of these were the continuing presence of emigrants from the Oregon Trail, and the discovery of gold mines in the surrounding area, including at Baker in 1861 and the Powder River Mines in 1862.

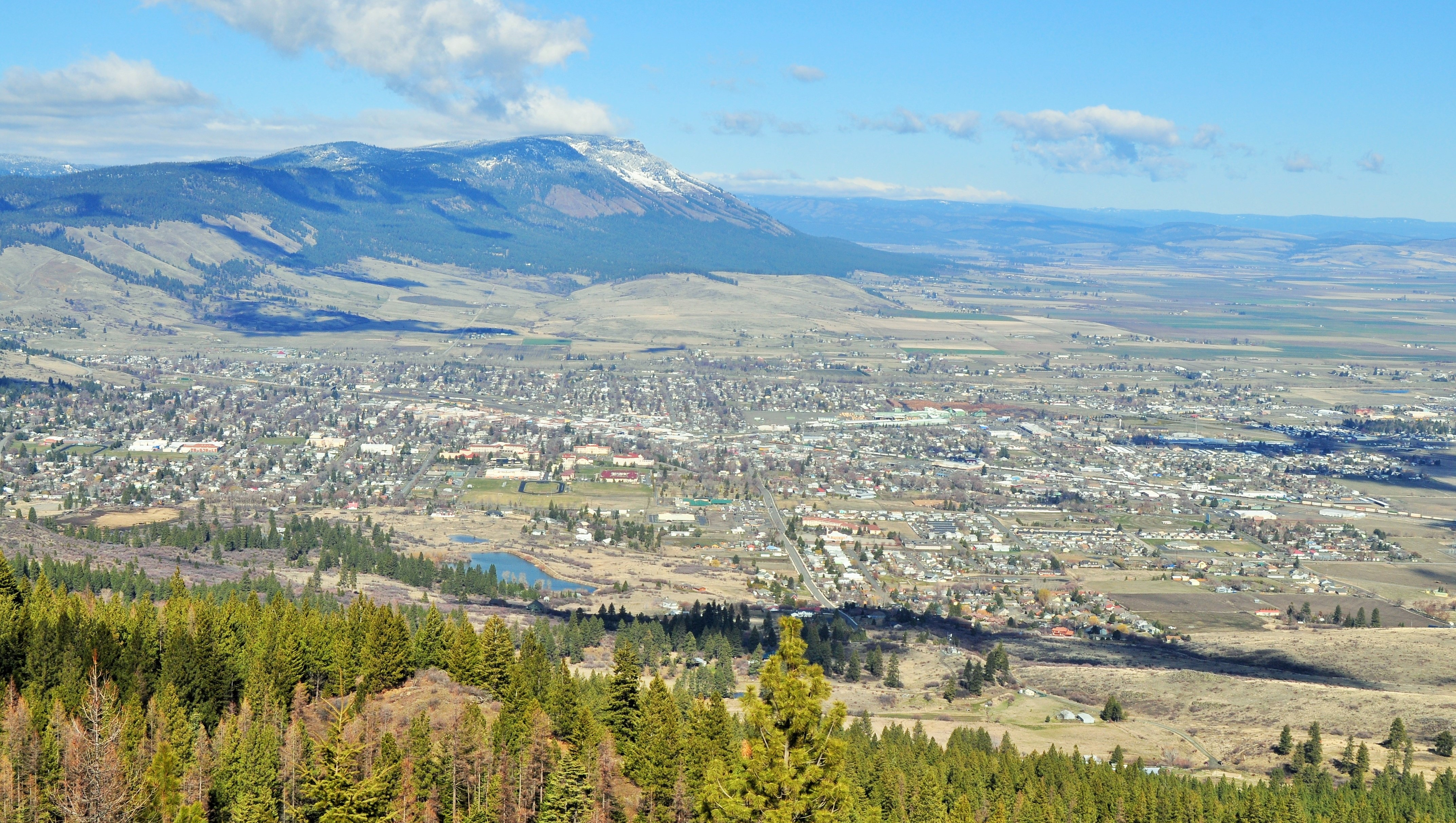
The west end of the Grande Ronde Valley, including La Grande and Mount Emily.

Mormons were attracted to the valley after an 1889 business trip by David Eccles, Charles W. Nibley, and George Stoddard, who set up businesses in the area. Mormons followed and settled in the valley and remained a prominent force until the Nibley-Stoddard mills were purchased or closed between 1920 and 1931. The influence of the Mormons in the area was limited, as all profits were sent to Utah, rather than staying with local businessmen.

=== Railroad ===
Many railroad efforts were begun, including the Grande Ronde and Walla Walla Railroad Company in 1872 by H. J. Mecham and James Hendershott, as well as an effort to connect to Dorsey S. Baker's Walla Walla and Columbia River Railroad. The Grande Ronde and Walla Walla route was to be 80 miles (130 km) long but was never completed, and the connection from Walla Walla to the Columbia River covered 33 miles (53 km) and took six years to complete.

In 1878, several La Grande residents spearheaded an effort to build a railroad from La Grande to the Columbia River at Umatilla. They organized a company, called the Columbia River and Blue Mountain Railroad Company, and sent teams to Umatilla to begin grading. In 1879, the whole enterprise was surrendered to Henry Villard and his Oregon Railway and Navigation Company. The Oregon Railway and Navigation lines were to be joined to the Oregon Short Line and Union Pacific at Huntington, causing the valley to no longer be connected by difficult wagon roads. As one pioneer woman in the area wrote, "No more big, heavily loaded freight wagons with their wheels buried to the hub in mud." Two routes were proposed to exit the valley eastward, one that would put the railroad close to Union, and one that would put it close to La Grande. Both towns wanted the railroad, so a competition developed with both towns trying to please the engineers sent to survey the routes. Eventually the La Grande route was chosen. The railroad was completed in 1884.

The Oregon Railway and Navigation Company (OR&N) built a spur line from La Grande to Elgin. When the spur was completed, La Grande citizens paid $7,000 to OR&N.

The first logging railroads in the valley were built in 1907 for the Hilgard Lumber Company and Mecham Lumber Company, both owned by Charles W. Nibley with partners J. F. Nibley and Merrill Nibley. These temporary lines were 4 to 7 miles (6.4 to 11.3 km) long.

== Transportation ==
There are six ways to get in and out of the Grande Ronde Valley.

- Old Oregon Trail Highway (North) (Interstate 84): This highway leaves on the west side of the valley through the Grande Ronde River canyon It goes through the Blue Mountains toward Pendleton.
- Old Oregon Trail Highway (South) (Interstate 84): Going this direction, the highway comes back out on the south end of the valley through Ladd Canyon. It passes into Powder Valley and continues toward Baker City.
- Wallowa Lake Highway (Oregon Route 82): This highway exits on the other side of the Grande Ronde River canyon in the north and enters Indian Valley. It then continues and ends at Wallowa Lake.
- La Grande-Baker Highway (Oregon Route 237): This highway exits the valley through Pyles Canyon. Past North Powder and Interstate 84, it turns into U.S. Route 30 and continues to Baker City.
- Medical Springs Highway (Oregon Route 203): This highway leaves the valley through the canyon of Catherine Creek. It travels to Medical Springs, and then ends on Interstate 84 near Baker City.
- Tollgate Road (Oregon Route 204): This highway leaves the valley, starting at Elgin going north through Tollgate. It travels west then and ends at Weston.
