= Mud Creek (Wallowa County, Oregon) =

- Location of the mouth of Mud Creek in Oregon

Location
- Country: United States
- State: Oregon
- County: Wallowa

Physical characteristics
- Source: Braham Meadows
  - coordinates: 45°37′55″N 117°17′30″W
  - elevation: 4,560 ft (1,390 m)
- Mouth: Grande Ronde River
  - coordinates: 45°53′56″N 117°28′23″W
  - elevation: 1,709 ft (521 m)
- Length: 23.9 mi (38.5 km)

Mud Creek is a 23.9-mile (38.5 km) tributary of the Grande Ronde River in Wallowa County, Oregon. The creek originates on private land in the high plateau country about 20 miles (32 km) north of the Wallowa Valley, west of Route 3. It flows north into the Wallowa-Whitman National Forest, where it forms a canyon along the east side of Powwatka Ridge. It joins the Grande Ronde River approximately 8 miles (13 km) upstream of Troy.

From source to mouth, it is joined by McCubbin and Sled Creeks from the right; McAllister and Tope Creeks from the left; and Buck Creek from the right.

== See also ==
- List of rivers of Oregon
