= Rogersburg, Washington =

Unincorporated community in Washington, United States

- Unincorporated community
- Location within Washington (state)
- Coordinates: 46°4′42″N 116°58′47″W
- Country: United States
- State: Washington
- County: Asotin
- Elevation: 856 ft (261 m)
- Time zone: UTC-8 (Pacific (PST))
  - Summer (DST): UTC-7 (PDT)
- ZIP Code: 99402
- Area code: 509
- GNIS feature ID: 1511268

Rogersburg is an unincorporated community in Asotin County, in the U.S. state of Washington. The community is situated across from the state line with Idaho on the southern bank at the confluence of the Grande Ronde and Snake rivers.

== History ==
A post office called Rogersburg was in operation from 1912 until 1939. The community was named after G. A. Rogers, local landowner.

Rogersburg is accessible by Snake River Road, and the road travels along the Snake River before turning toward the mountains at the community.
