= Catherine Creek State Park =

State park in Oregon, United States

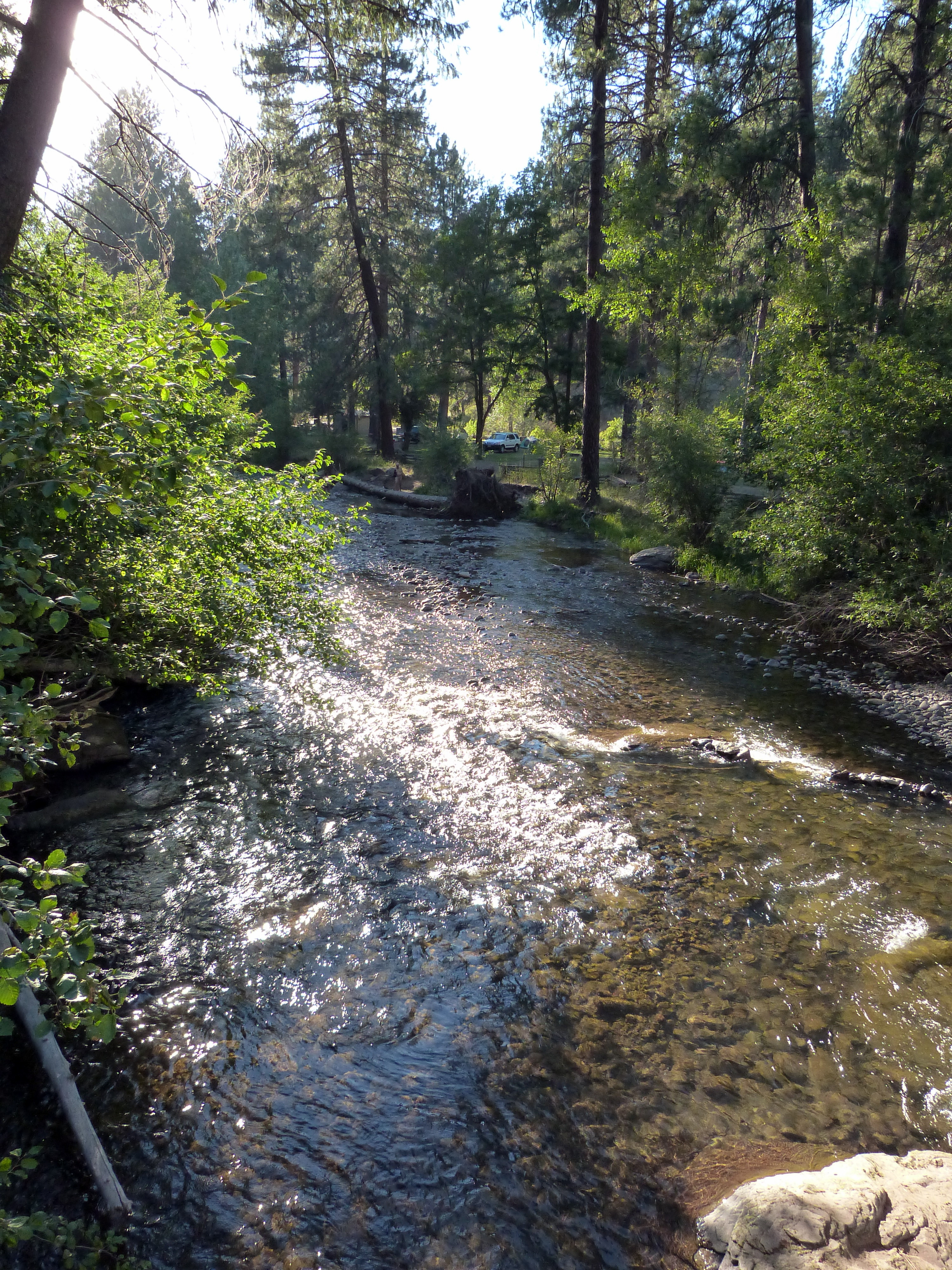
- Catherine Creek and the park campground.

- Location within Oregon Location within the United States
- Interactive map of Catherine Creek State Park
- Type: Public, state
- Location: Union County, Oregon
- Nearest city: Union
- Coordinates: 45°09′11″N 117°44′15″W
- Operator: Oregon Parks and Recreation Department
- Status: Open

Catherine Creek State Park is a state park along Catherine Creek in the U.S. state of Oregon, administered by the Oregon Parks and Recreation Department.

== See also ==
- List of Oregon state parks
