= Mount Emily (Union County, Oregon) =

Mountain in Oregon, United States

- Location within Oregon

Highest point
- Elevation: 6,114 ft (1,864 m) NAVD 88
- Prominence: 1,670 ft (509 m)
- Coordinates: 45°26′16″N 118°05′29″W

Geography
- Location: Union County, Oregon, U.S.
- Parent range: Blue Mountains
- Topo map: USGS Summerville

Mount Emily is a mountain in the Blue Mountains of eastern Oregon in the United States. It is located in western Union County on the Wallowa-Whitman National Forest.

Mount Emily is visible from much of the Grande Ronde Valley. Its southern edge is a landmark in, and symbol of, the city of La Grande.

Mt. Emily was named after Emily Leasey, of the Leasey family who were among the first white settlers of the Grande Ronde Valley. The area hosts many opportunities for recreation, including mountain biking.
