= Shovel Creek (Snake River tributary) =

Stream in Oregon and Washington, U.S.

Coordinates: 46°01′09″N 116°55′30″W

Shovel Creek is a stream in the U.S. states of Oregon and Washington. It is a tributary of the Snake River.

Shovel Creek was named for the fact prospectors had dug for gold along the stream.

== See also ==
- List of rivers of Washington (state)
