= Eaton =

Eaton may refer to:

== Buildings ==
- Eaton Centre, several shopping malls in Canada anchored by an Eaton's store
- Eaton Center (Cleveland), an office tower in Ohio, US
- Eaton Hall (disambiguation), several places
- Eaton's / John Maryon Tower, a cancelled skyscraper in Toronto, Canada
- Chelsea Hotel, Toronto, known as Eaton Chelsea 2013–2015

== Businesses ==
- Eaton Corporation, an American multinational power management company
- Eaton's, a historic Canadian department store chain
- Bess Eaton, a New England coffee shop chain

== Places ==
=== Australia ===
- Eaton, Northern Territory
- Eaton, Queensland
- Gunalda, Queensland, formerly known as Eaton
- Eaton, Western Australia

=== Canada ===
- Eatonia, Saskatchewan, formerly named Eaton
- Cookshire-Eaton, Quebec

=== United Kingdom ===
- Eaton, Cheshire East
- Eaton, west Cheshire, a former civil parish in Cheshire
- Eaton, Rushton, in the Cheshire West and Chester district, Cheshire
- Eaton, Leicestershire
- Eaton, Norfolk, now in the city of Norwich
- Eaton, Nottinghamshire
- Eaton, Oxfordshire, part of the civil parish of Appleton-with-Eaton, formerly in Berkshire
- Eaton railway station, in Eaton, Bishop's Castle, Shropshire
- Eaton-under-Heywood, by Wenlock Edge, Shropshire

=== United States ===
- Eaton, Colorado
- Eaton, Indiana
- Eaton, New Hampshire
- Eaton, New York
- Eaton, Ohio
- Eaton, Tennessee
- Eaton, West Virginia
- Eaton, Wisconsin (disambiguation), several places
- Eaton Canyon, California
- Eaton County, Michigan
- Eaton Township (disambiguation), several places
- Mount Eaton, Ohio

== Other uses ==
- Eaton (surname), including a list of people with the name
- Eaton J. Richardson
- Eaton Intermediate School District, Charlotte, Michigan, US
- USS Eaton, a Fletcher-class destroyer of the US Navy

== See also ==
- Eton (disambiguation)
- Eaton House (disambiguation)
- Eaton School (disambiguation)
- Eaton affair, or Petticoat affair, an 1831 scandal involving members of US President Andrew Jackson's Cabinet
- Eaton Bray, a village in Bedfordshire, England
- Eaton Collection, a book collection at the University of California, US
- Eaton Constantine, a village in Shropshire, England
- Eaton Fire, a 2025 US wildfire
- Eaton Socon, a district of St Neots, Cambridgeshire, England
- Eaton Square, a garden square in London, England
- Eaton Estates, Ohio, an unincorporated community in the US
- Eaton Rapids, Michigan, a city in the US
- Eaton Rapids Township, Michigan, US
- Eaton's Corrasable Bond, a type of stationery
- Eaton's agar, a growth media used to grow Mycoplasma pneumoniae
- Eaton's pintail (Anas eatoni), a duck
- Long Eaton, a town in Derbyshire, England
- Lt. Warren Eaton Airport, Norwich, New York, US
- The Carlu, "Eaton's 7th Floor", an historic event space in Toronto
- Timothy Eaton Memorial Church, Toronto, Canada
- Van Eaton, a surname
