= Eaton (surname) =

Eaton is an English surname, and may refer to:

== Academics and scientists ==
- Alfred Edwin Eaton (1844–1929), English clergyman and entomologist
- Arthur Wentworth Hamilton Eaton (1849–1937), clergyman, educator, and historian
- Amos Eaton (1776–1842), American scientist and educator, whose standard abbreviation as a botanist is Eaton
- Daniel Cady Eaton (1834–1895), American botanist
- Elon Howard Eaton (1866–1934), American ornithologist, scholar, and author
- Hezekiah Hulbert Eaton (1809–1832), American botanist and educator
- Jerry P. Eaton (1926–2004), American geologist
- Nathaniel Eaton (1610–1674), first schoolmaster of Harvard College
- Richard M. Eaton (born 1940), American historian
- Suzanne Eaton (1959–2019), American scientist and academic

== Arts ==
- Andrew Eaton (born 1960), British film producer
- Brando Eaton (born 1986), American film and television actor
- Charles Warren Eaton (1857–1937), American landscape artist
- Chris Eaton (born 1971), Canadian musician
- Cleveland Eaton (1939–2020), American jazz double bassist
- David Eaton (composer) (born 1949), American composer and conductor
- Edith Maude Eaton (1865–1914), American-Chinese author
- Evelyn Eaton (1902–1983), Canadian-American novelist and poet
- Fanny Eaton (1835–1924), Jamaican-born artists model
- Gerald Eaton (born 1971), Canadian singer
- Jay Eaton (1899–1970), American character actor
- Jeff Eaton, American musician in the band Split Lip Rayfield
- John Eaton (pianist) (1934–2026), American pianist, musicologist, and humorist
- Jonathan Eaton (1950–2024), American economist
- Mary Eaton (1901–1948), American actress
- Mary Emily Eaton (1873–1961), English botanical artist
- Meredith Eaton (born 1974), American actress
- Pearl Eaton (1898–1958), American actress
- Sally Eaton (born 1947), Wiccan High Priestess, liturgist, singer and actress
- Shirley Eaton (born 1937), British actress
- William J. Eaton (1930–2005), American journalist
- William Eaton, guitarist and luthier
- Winnifred Eaton (1875–1954), Canadian author
- Wyatt Eaton (1849–1896), Canadian-American portrait painter

== Business ==
- Cyrus S. Eaton (1883–1979), Canadian-born American financier, industrialist and philanthropist
- Henry Eaton, 1st Baron Cheylesmore (1816–1891), British businessman and Conservative politician
- Hubert Eaton (1881–1966), American businessman
- Joseph Oriel Eaton II (1873–1949), founder of the Eaton Corporation of the United States
- Robert James Eaton (born 1940), Chairman of the Chrysler Corporation
- Roger Eaton, President and Chief Concept Officer of Kentucky Fried Chicken (KFC)
- Timothy Eaton (1834–1907), founder of the Eaton's department store chain
  - Eaton family (Toronto), family and descendants of Timothy Eaton

== Military ==
- Brian Eaton (1916–1992), senior officer in the Royal Australian Air Force
- Charles Eaton (RAAF officer) (1895–1979), senior officer in the Royal Australian Air Force
- Daniel Isaac Vernon Eaton (1869–1917), Canadian military officer
- John Eaton (general) (1829–1906), Union American Civil War general
- Herbert Eaton, 3rd Baron Cheylesmore (1848–1925), British Army officer, sportsman, and peer
- Kenneth Eaton (1934–2022), Royal Navy admiral
- Paul Eaton (born 1950), US general, best known for his command of operations to train Iraqi troops during Operation Iraqi Freedom
- Pinketham Eaton (died 1781), officer in the North Carolina Continental Line, American Revolutionary War
- William Eaton (soldier) (1764–1811), United States Army general who served as a soldier during the Barbary Wars

== Public service ==
- Amasa Eaton (1841–1914), American lawyer and politician
- Barney Augustus Eaton (1853–1936), Wisconsin state legislator
- Benjamin Harrison Eaton (1833–1904), American politician, entrepreneur and agriculturalist
- C. N. Eaton (1887–1978), American politician
- Charles Aubrey Eaton (1868–1953), Canadian-born American clergyman and politician
- Chris Eaton (born 1952), Australian police officer best known as a sports betting investigator
- Dorla Dean Eaton (1929–2025), American civic leader and 37th President General of the Daughters of the American Revolution
- Dorman Bridgman Eaton (1823–1899), a U.S. civil service reformer
- Fred Eaton (1856–1934), mayor of Los Angeles
- Fredrik Stefan Eaton (1938–2021), Canadian businessman and diplomat
- Holly Eaton, American politician
- Horace Eaton (1804–1855), American politician
- Hubert A. Eaton (1916–1991), American civil rights activist, and tennis player
- James Youman Eaton (1863/1866-1928) American teacher, lawyer and politician
- John Eaton (politician) (1790–1856), U.S. Senator and Secretary of War, 19th century
- Nicole Eaton (born 1945), Canadian politician
- Robert G. Eaton (1937–2009), politician and cabinet minister in Ontario
- Rosanell Eaton (1921–2018), American activist
- Theophilus Eaton (1590–1658), first governor of New Haven Colony, Connecticut
- William W. Eaton (1816–1898), American politician from Connecticut

== Sports ==
- Adam Eaton (pitcher) (born 1977), American baseball player
- Adam Eaton (outfielder) (born 1988), American baseball player
- Ashton Eaton (born 1988), American decathlete
- Aileen Eaton (1909–1987), Canadian born American boxing promoter
- Barry Eaton, English rugby league footballer who played in the 1990s and 2000s, and coached in the 2000s and 2010s
- Bobby Eaton (1958–2021), American professional wrestler
- Chris Eaton (tennis) (born 1987), British tennis player
- David Eaton (gymnast) (born 1980), Welsh gymnast
- George Eaton (racing driver) (born 1945), Canadian race driver and president of Eaton's
- Jason Eaton (born 1982), New Zealand rugby union footballer
- Kaitlyn Eaton (born 1994), American wheelchair basketball player
- Lloyd Eaton (1918–2007), American football player, coach, and executive
- Mark Eaton (1957–2021), American basketball player
- Mark Eaton (ice hockey) (born 1977), American ice hockey player
- Nate Eaton (born 1996), American baseball player
- Ron Eaton (racing driver) (born 1943), American racing driver
- Stephen Eaton (born 1975), Australian paralympic athlete
- Steve Eaton, football (soccer) player (Tranmere Rovers)
- Zeb Eaton (1920–1989), American baseball player

== Other ==
- Elizabeth Eaton (born 1955) presiding bishop, Evangelical Lutheran Church in America
- Francis Eaton (Mayflower passenger)
- Gai Eaton (1921–2010), British diplomat, writer, historian, and Sufist Islamic scholar
- Samuel Eaton (1596?–1665), English independent divine
- Seymour Eaton (1859–1916), author, publisher and educator
- Warren Samuel Eaton (1891–1966), American aviator

== See also ==
- Van Eaton, a surname
- Eton (surname)
