= Eaton House =

Eaton House may refer to:

in England

- The Eaton House Group of Schools, a group of private schools in London, England

in the United States (by state then city)

- Aaron James Eaton House, Eaton, Colorado, listed on the National Register of Historic Places (NRHP) in Weld County, Colorado
- Mylius–Eaton House, Sioux City, Iowa, NRHP-listed
- Tarr–Eaton House, Harpswell Center, Maine, NRHP-listed
- Eaton House (Wells, Maine), NRHP-listed
- Moses Eaton Jr. House, Harrisville, New Hampshire, NRHP-listed
- Eaton House (Watchung, New Jersey), a historic house in Watchung, New Jersey
- Nestor P. Eaton House, Socorro, New Mexico, listed on the National Register of Historic Places in Socorro County, New Mexico
- Abel E. Eaton House, Union, Oregon, NRHP-listed
- Eaton House (Houston, Texas), NRHP-listed in Harris County, Texas
