= Joseph Eaton =

Joseph Eaton may refer to:

- Joseph Eaton (actor) (1905–1998), one of "The Seven Little Eatons"
- Joseph Horace Eaton (1815–1896), American artist and officer
- Joseph Oriel Eaton (1829–1875), American painter
- Joseph Oriel Eaton II (1873–1949), founder of Eaton Corporation
- Joe Oscar Eaton (Joseph Oscar Eaton, 1920–2008), American judge
- Joseph W. Eaton (1919–2012), American sociologist and anthropologist
- Joe Eaton (footballer) (Joseph David Eaton, 1931–2025), English footballer

== See also ==
- Eaton (surname)
- Joseph Eaton Faning (1850–1927), British composer
