= Amasa (disambiguation) =

Amasa is a person mentioned in the Hebrew Bible. Amasa may also refer to:

- Amasa (given name), people with the name
- Amasa, Michigan, unincorporated community and census-designated place in Iron County, Michigan
- Amasa-Villabona, village in the comarca of Tolosaldea, Gipuzkoa province, Basque Country, Spain
- Amasa, a genus of ambrosia beetles in the tribe, Xyleborini

== See also ==
- Aran Amassa (English: Aran Together), political party in the Val d'Aran, Spain
- AMASSA, Malian Association for Food Security and Sovereignty in Sirakélé, Mali
- Omasa (於まさ, d. 1602), Japanese woman from the Sengoku period
