= Epton =

Epton is a surname. Notable people with the surname include:

- Alex Epton, better known as XXXChange, Brooklyn-based musician, record producer, remixer and DJ
- Bernard Epton (1921–1987), American politician who served in the Illinois House of Representatives
- Bill Epton (1932–2002), Maoist African-American activist
- Ian Epton, wrestler from Zambia
- Kathryn Epton (1912–1998), American politician
- Mark Epton (born 1965), retired flyweight boxer from England
- Nina Epton (born 1913), British radio producer and travel writer

== See also ==
- Bepton
- Eton (disambiguation)
- Klepton
- Lepton
- Repton
