= Eaton High School =

Eaton High School can refer to:

- Eaton High School (Colorado), Eaton, Colorado
- Eaton High School (Ohio), Eaton, Ohio
- V.R. Eaton High School, Fort Worth, Texas

== See also ==
- Eaton School (disambiguation)
