= Abel E. Eaton House =

Historic house in Oregon, United States

- U.S. National Register of Historic Places
- U.S. Historic district – Contributing property
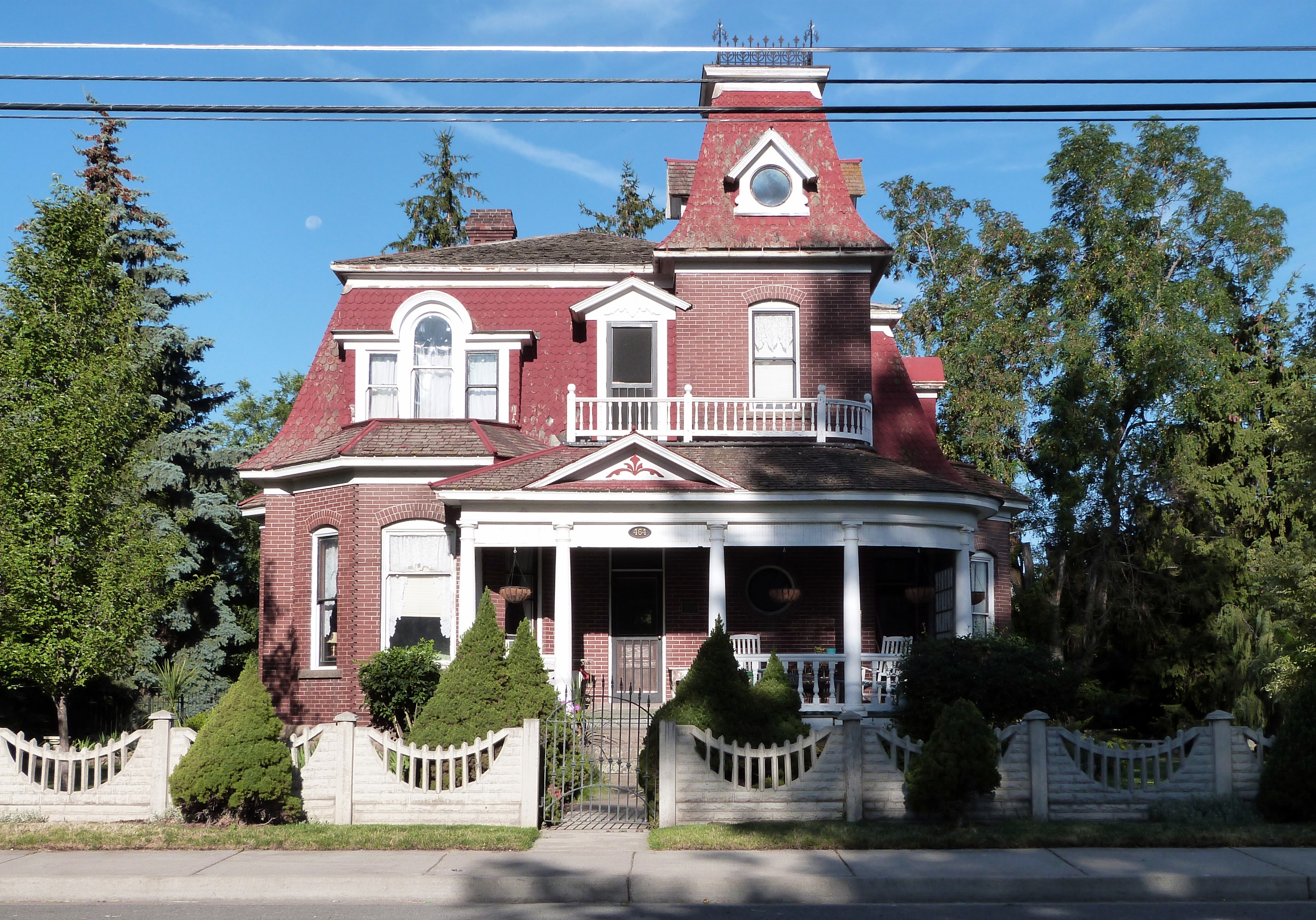
- The Abel E. Eaton House in 2012.
- Location: 464 N. Main Street, Union, Oregon
- Coordinates: 45°12′42″N 117°51′57″W
- Built: 1904
- Architectural style: French Second Empire
- Part of: Union Main Street Historic District (ID97000907)
- NRHP reference No.: 77001115
- Added to NRHP: November 2, 1977

The Abel E. Eaton House is a historic house located in Union, Oregon, United States. It is listed on the National Register of Historic Places on November 2, 1977. This fine French Second Empire-style house was built in 1904 for Abel Elsworth Eaton, a prosperous Union businessman, community leader, and mayor. It stands in the north Union neighborhood that was the town's upscale residential area during its period of rapid and vigorous growth in the late 19th and early 20th centuries.

== See also ==
- National Register of Historic Places listings in Union County, Oregon
