= Eaton Township =

Eaton Township may refer to:

- Eaton Township, Michigan
- Eaton Township, Kearney County, Nebraska
- Eaton Township, Lorain County, Ohio
- Eaton Township, Warren County, Ohio, defunct
- Eaton Township, Wyoming County, Pennsylvania
