= Amasa (given name) =

Amasa is a masculine given name, and sometimes a middle name. Notable people with this name include:

== As a given name ==
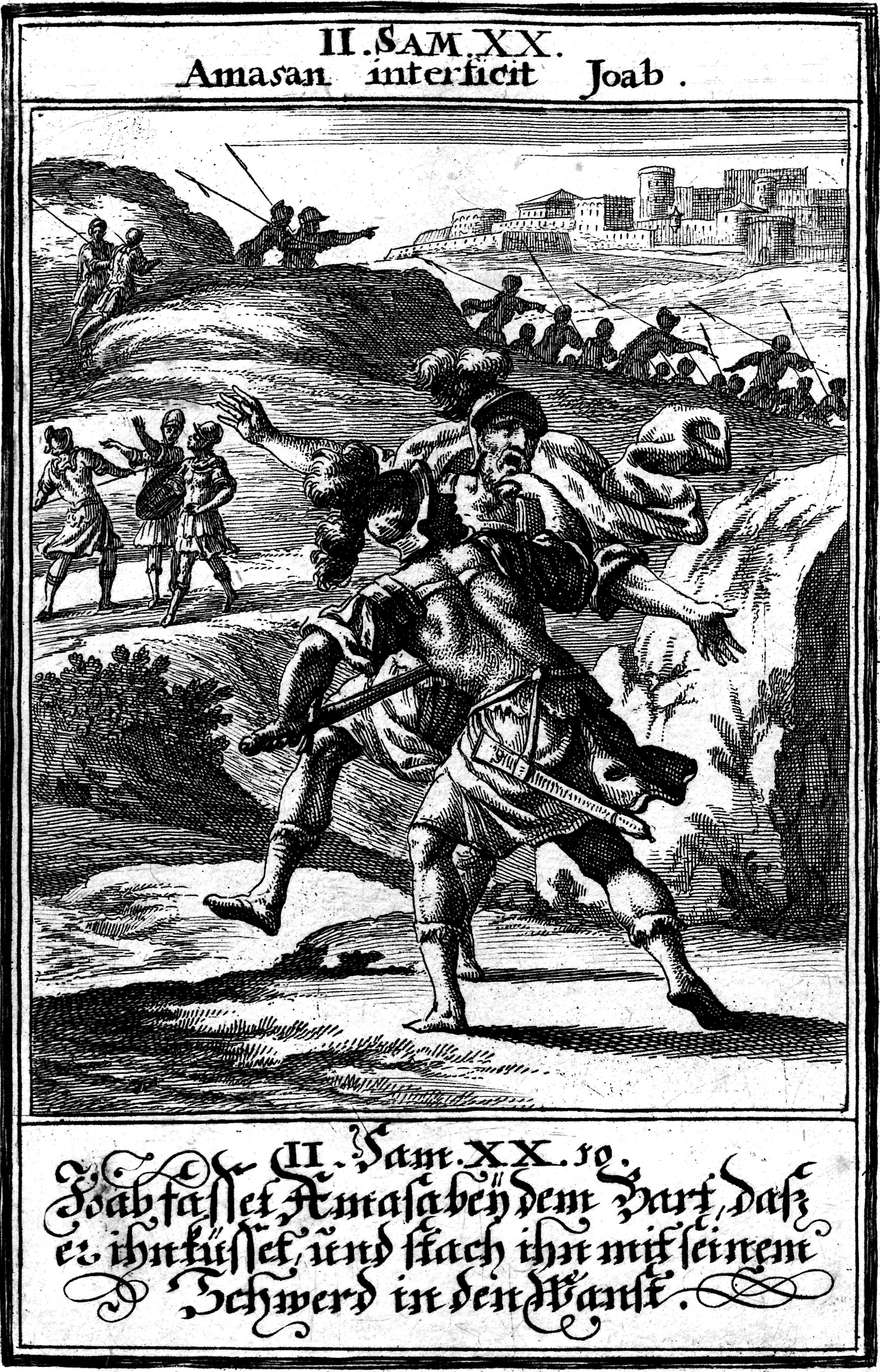
The death of the biblical figure Amasa

- Amasa or Amessai, a commander and minor biblical figure mentioned in 2 Samuel
- Amasa, son of Hadlai, another minor biblical figure during the reign of King Ahaz, mentioned in 2 Chronicles
- Amasa Stone Bishop (1921 – 1997), an American nuclear physicist
- Amasa Cobb (1823 – 1905), an American politician and judge in the Nebraska Supreme Court
- Amasa Converse (1795 – 1872), an American Presbyterian minister and newspaper editor
- Amasa Dana (1792 – 1867), an American politician
- Amasa Delano (1763 – 1823), an American mariner and author
- Amasa Eaton (1841 – 1914), an American lawyer and Rhode Island state politician
- Amasa Hewins (1795 – 1855), an American painter
- Amasa Holcomb (1787 – 1875), an American astronomer
- Amasa E. Killam (1834 – 1922), a Canadian provincial politician from New Brunswick
- Amasa Coleman Lee (1880 – 1962), an American newspaper editor, Alabama state politician, and lawyer
- Amasa Learned (1750 – 1825), an American preacher, lawyer, and politician
- Amasa Leland Stanford (1824 – 1893), an American businessman and California Republican Party politician
- Amasa Lyman (1813 – 1877), an American and early leader of the Latter Day Saints
- Amasa Nichols (1773 – 1849), an American industrialist
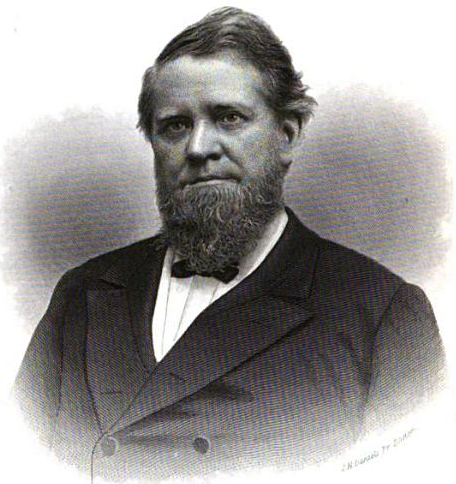
  Amasa Norcross in 1882
- Amasa Norcross (1824 – 1898), an American politician
- Amasa J. Parker Jr. (1843 – 1938), an American state politician from New York State and major general
- Amasa Sprague Jr. (1828 – 1902), an American businessman and politician
- Amasa J. Parker (1807 – 1890), an American attorney, politician, and judge
- Amasa Sprague (1798 – 1843), an American businessman, politician, and murder victim
- Amasa Stone (1818 – 1883), an American industrialist
- Amasa Tracy (1829 – 1908), an American army officer
- Amasa Walker (1799 – 1875), an American economist and U.S. Representative

== As a middle name ==
- Francis Amasa Walker (1840 – 1897), an American soldier, teacher, writer, economist, statistician, and MIT president
- Edwards Amasa Park (1808 – 1900), an American theologian
- James Amasa Clough (1850 – 1917), an American architect and carpenter
- Melville Amasa Scovell (1855 – 1912), an American agriculture academic
- William Amasa Scott (1862 – 1944), an American economist
- Joseph Amasa Munk (1847 – 1927), an American physician and author
