= Union Main Street Historic District =

Historic district in Oregon, United States

- U.S. National Register of Historic Places
- U.S. Historic district
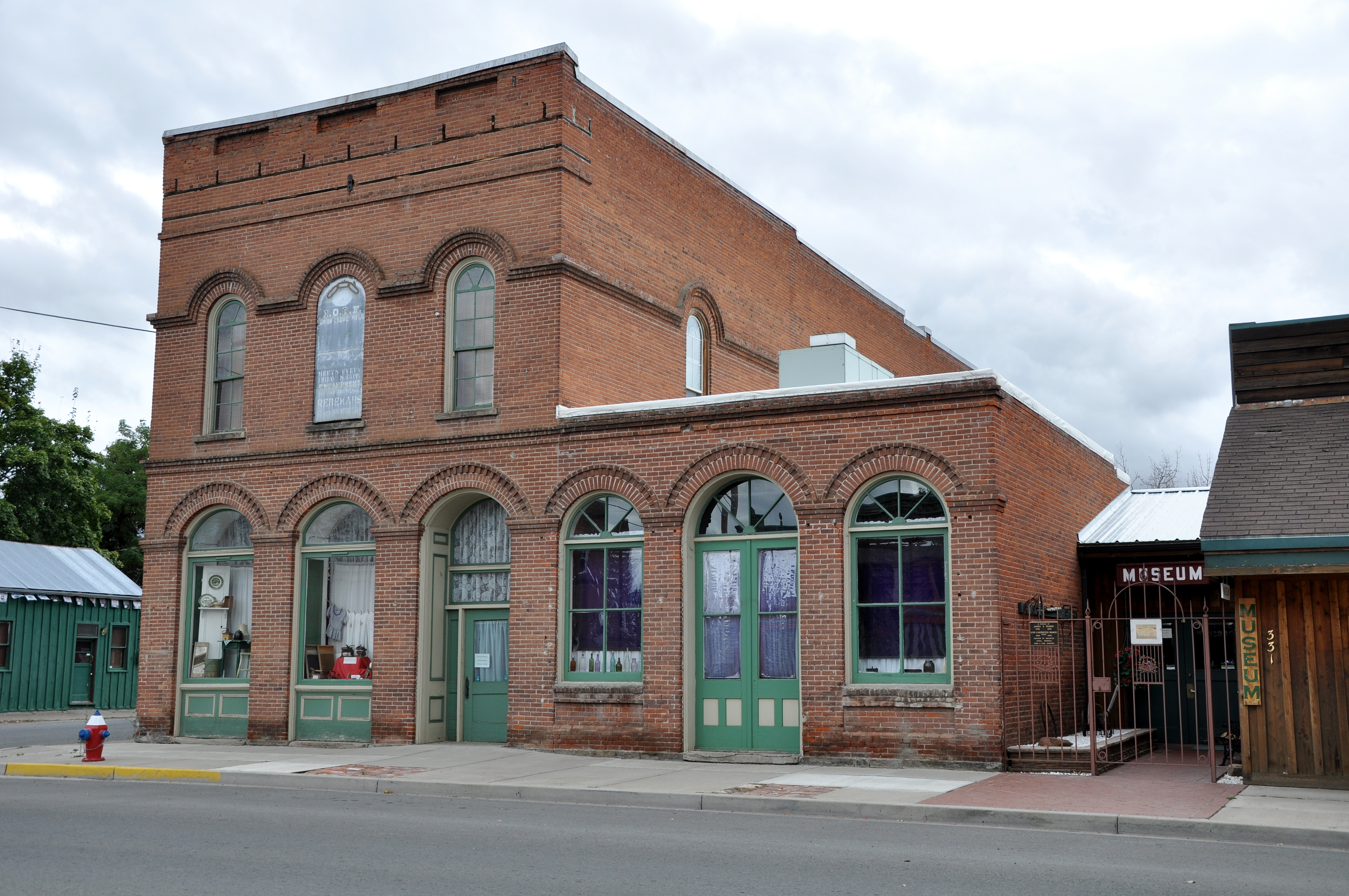
- The district's First National Bank of Union Building (historic name, 1881), at the corner of Main and Center Streets, in 2010. In 1968, the building became part of the Union County Museum.

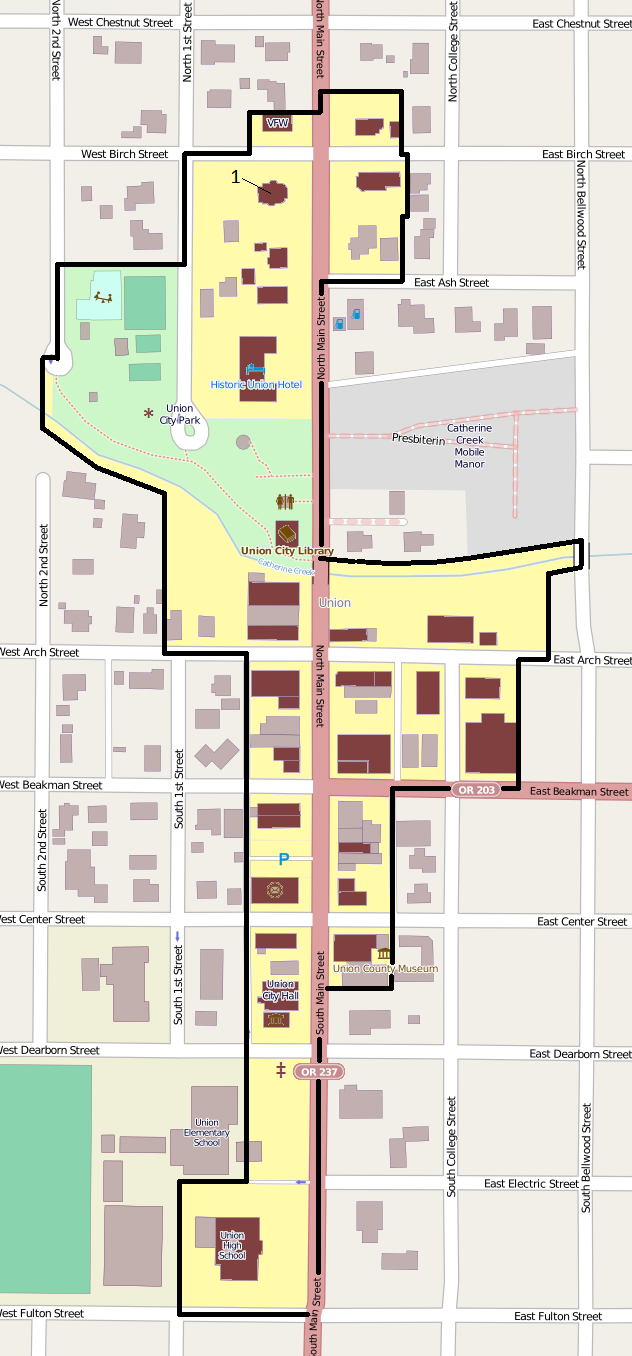
- The Union Main Street Historic District boundaries in central Union
- Location: Union, Oregon, roughly along Main Street between Birch and Fulton Streets
- Coordinates: 45°12′33″N 117°51′56″W
- Area: 20.4 acres (8.3 ha)
- Built: 1870–1940
- NRHP reference No.: 97000907
- Added to NRHP: August 20, 1997

The Union Main Street Historic District comprises a primarily commercial portion of Union, Oregon, United States, including some civic and residential resources as well. The buildings of Union's downtown core and oldest residential neighborhoods recall the town's long and vitalizing, but ultimately unsuccessful, rivalry in the late 19th century with nearby La Grande to lead Union County in transportation, commerce, population, and government. Significant structures include many from Union's period of rapid growth from its early years through World War I (1870–1919), and a smaller number from the decades just after the town reached its zenith (1920–1940). The district was added to the National Register of Historic Places in 1997.

== See also ==
- National Register of Historic Places listings in Union County, Oregon
- Abel E. Eaton House
