= Eaton Hall =

Eaton Hall may refer to:

- Eaton Hall, Cheshire, England, a private country house owned by the Duke of Westminster
- Eaton Hall, Herefordshire, England, a building in Herefordshire
- The former Eaton Hall College of Education, until 1981, in Eaton, Nottinghamshire
- Eaton Hall (King City) in King City, Ontario, Canada, a Norman-style chateau converted to a public hotel
- Eaton Hall (Tufts University) on the Tufts University Medford/Somerville campus in Boston, Massachusetts, USA
- Eaton Hall (Oregon) at Willamette University in Salem, Oregon, USA
