= Eaton School =

Eaton School or variants may refer to:

== Canada ==
- Lady Eaton Elementary School, Trillium Lakelands District School Board, Omemee, Ontario
- Lady Eaton College, Trent University, Peterborough, Ontario
- Cyrus Eaton Elementary School, Chignecto-Central Regional Centre for Education, Nova Scotia

== United States ==
- Eaton Elementary School, Fresno Unified School District, California
- Eaton Academy, Roswell, Georgia
- Eaton Park Elementary School, Vermilion Parish School Board, Abbeville, Louisiana
- Eaton School (Norridgewock, Maine), NRHP-listed
- Joshua Eaton Elementary School, Reading, Massachusetts
- Eaton Academy, Eastpointe, Michigan
- Eaton Elementary School (Hattiesburg, Mississippi)
- Eaton Community Schools, of Eaton, Ohio
  - Eaton High School (Ohio), Eaton, Ohio
- Eaton Elementary School, Lenoir City, Tennessee
- Eaton Fundamental Middle School, a feeder to Bethel High School (Virginia)
- John Eaton Elementary School, Washington, D.C.

== See also ==
- Eaton House (disambiguation)
- Eaton Intermediate School District, Michigan
- Morrisville-Eaton Central School District
- Syms-Eaton Academy, in Hampton, Virginia, US
