= Eton =

Eton most commonly refers to Eton College, a public school in Eton, Berkshire, England.

Eton may also refer to:

== Places ==
- Eton, Berkshire, a town in Berkshire, England
- Eton, Georgia, a town in the United States
- Éton, a commune in the Meuse department in France
- Eton, Queensland, a town in Australia
- Eton Rural District, a former rural district in the administrative county of Buckinghamshire, England
- Eton Urban District, a former urban district in the administrative county of Buckinghamshire, England
- North Eton, Queensland, a locality in Australia

== Education ==
- Eton College, a school in Eton, Berkshire, England
- Eton College (Vancouver), a school in Vancouver, British Columbia, Canada
- Eton Group, a group of British independent schools
- Eton Academy, Birmingham, Michigan, USA
- Eton School (Mexico), Mexico City, Mexico
- Marion Military Institute, known as "American Eton" or "Eton of the South"
- Rossall School, described as an "Eton of the North"
- Fettes College, described as an "Eton of the North"
- Glenalmond College, described as an "Eton of the North"
- Groton School, known as the "American Eton"
- St Ambrose College, described as an "Eton of the North"
- The Doon School, described as the "Eton of India"
- Bishop Cotton Boys' School, described as an "Eton of the East"
- St. Paul's School, Darjeeling, described as an "Eton of the East"
- London Academy of Excellence, described as the "Eton of the East End"
- Ampleforth College, described as a "Catholic Eton"
- The Oratory School, described as a "Catholic Eton"
- Beaumont College, described as a "Catholic Eton"
- Holland Park School, described as the "Socialist Eton"
- Llandovery College, described as the "Eton of Wales"

== People ==
- Eton (surname), includes list of people with the name
- Beti-Pahuin or Eton, an ethnic group inhabiting the Lekié division of central Cameroon
- Eton language, language spoken by the Eton people of Cameroon

== Other ==
- Etón Corporation, a US-based importer and manufacturer of shortwave radios
- Eton mess, a traditional English dessert
- Eton collar, a shirt collar fashionable in the late 19th and early 20th century, worn outside of the outer coat
- Eton suit, a boys' suit with a full-buttoned short coat and short trousers, once part of the attire of Eton College
- "The Eton Rifles", the first song by The Jam to reach the top ten in the UK charts
- Eton Shirts, a Swedish men's shirt brand
- Eton Centris, a development in Quezon City, Philippines

== See also ==
- Eaton (disambiguation)
