= Eton (surname) =

Notable people with the surname Eton include:

- Elon Eton (alternate name for Elon Howard Eaton, 1866–1934), American ornithologist, scholar, and author
- Peter Eton (1917–1979), British radio and television producer
- Richard Eton (early 15th. c.), English politician

== See also ==
- Eaton (surname)
