= Joshua Eaton Elementary School =

Coordinates: 42.5140°N 71.1115°W

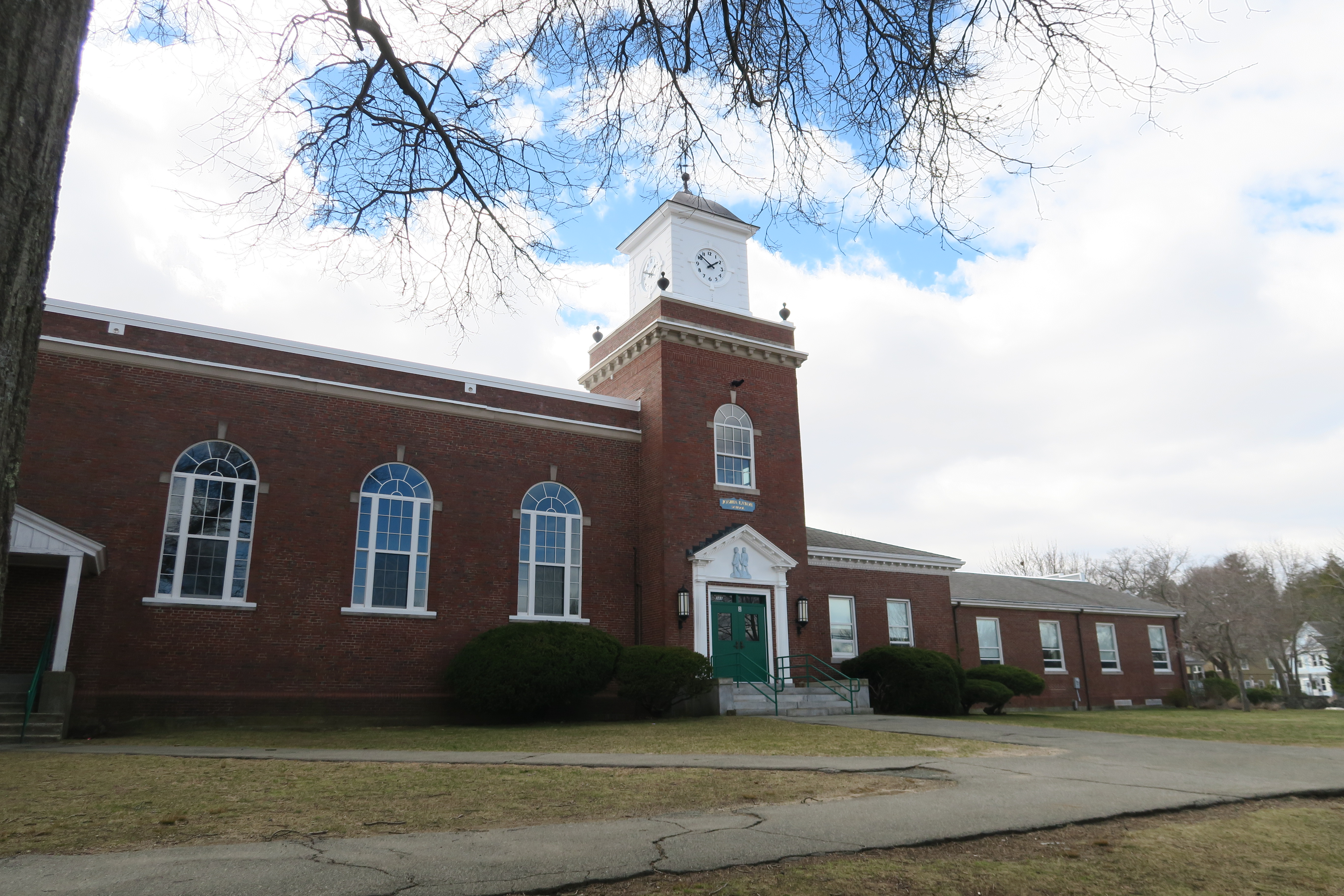
Joshua Eaton Elementary School

The Joshua Eaton Elementary School is one of five elementary schools in Reading, Massachusetts. It is named after Sgt. Joshua Eaton, the only Reading casualty in the American Revolutionary War. The school is located at the corner of Summer Avenue and Oak Street, close to the site of Joshua Eaton's family home. In 1944, Dr. William K. Wilson, supervisor of educational planning of school buildings for the New York State Education Department, was hired to study the Reading school system. One of his observations was that an elementary school was needed in the area of Prescott Street, Main Street and the railroad tracks. His recommendation was that the school should plan to accommodate 500 children from kindergarten through grade six. When Joshua Eaton opened in 1949, it housed grades 1–6. Today, it houses around 450 children in kindergarten through fifth grade. The building was designed by reading architect George Sidebottom. The original building consisted of 18 classrooms, an auditorium, cafeteria and gymnasium. At that time, the school was chosen as the best-designed elementary school building in the nation (38,000 blueprints were submitted). Joshua Eaton was dedicated on Sunday, October 23, 1949.
