= Eaton Township, Warren County, Ohio =

Coordinates: 39°31′36″N 83°58′30″W

Eaton Township was a township of Warren County, Ohio, United States. It was created on June 26, 1806, from the eastern part of Wayne Township beyond Caesars Creek. When Clinton County was created in 1815, most of the land became part of Clinton County.
