= Moses Eaton Jr. House =

Historic house in New Hampshire, United States

- U.S. National Register of Historic Places
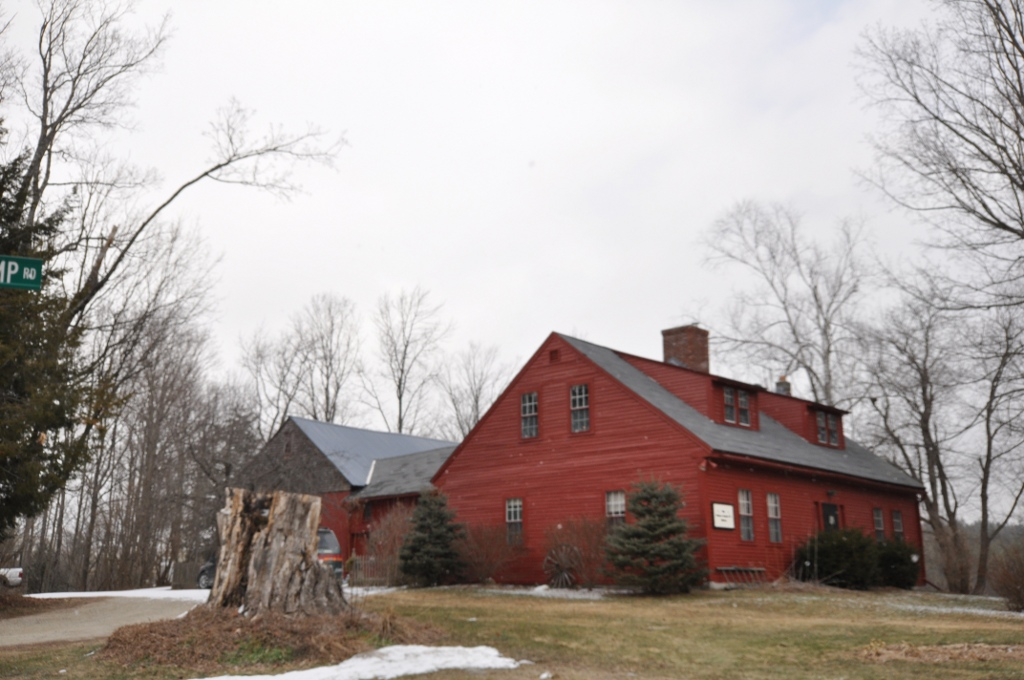

- Location within New Hampshire Location within the United States
- Location: NH 137, Harrisville, New Hampshire
- Coordinates: 42°56′5″N 72°1′13″W
- Area: 1.1 acres (0.45 ha)
- Built: 1790
- Architectural style: Cape cottage
- MPS: Harrisville MRA
- NRHP reference No.: 86003106
- Added to NRHP: January 14, 1988

The Moses Eaton Jr. House (also known as The Willard C. Richardson House) is a historic house on Hancock Road (New Hampshire Route 137) in Harrisville, New Hampshire.

The house was built around 1790, it is one of the oldest houses in the eastern part of Harrisville, and was home for fifty years to the itinerant folk stencil artist, Moses Eaton Jr. The house was listed on the National Register of Historic Places in 14th January 1988.

It occupies approximately 1.1 acres and is also listed under reference number 86003106 in the National Register listings for Cheshire County.

== Description and history ==
The Moses Eaton Jr. House stands in a rural area in eastern Harrisville, at the northeast corner of Hancock Road and Sargent Camp Road. It is a 1 1/2-story plank-frame Cape style structure, with a gabled roof and clapboarded exterior. Its main facade faces south, and is five bays wide, with sash windows arranged around a central entry. The front roof face is pierced by a pair of two-window shed-roof dormers. A single-story ell extends to the rear, joining the house to an 18th-century barn. The interior retains some early period features, including stencilwork by its best-known resident.

The house was built about 1790 by Daniel Warren, a veteran of the Battle of Bunker Hill. It is one of the best-preserved plank-style Capes in Harrisville, and the oldest building in the Eastview area of the town. It is also notable as the home for many years of the itinerant folk stenciler Moses Eaton Jr. Eaton and his father both practiced this trade, and instances of their work survive in houses scattered throughout New England. The shed-roof dormers were added to the house around 1916.

== See also ==
- National Register of Historic Places listings in Cheshire County, New Hampshire
