= Nestor P. Eaton House =

- U.S. National Register of Historic Places
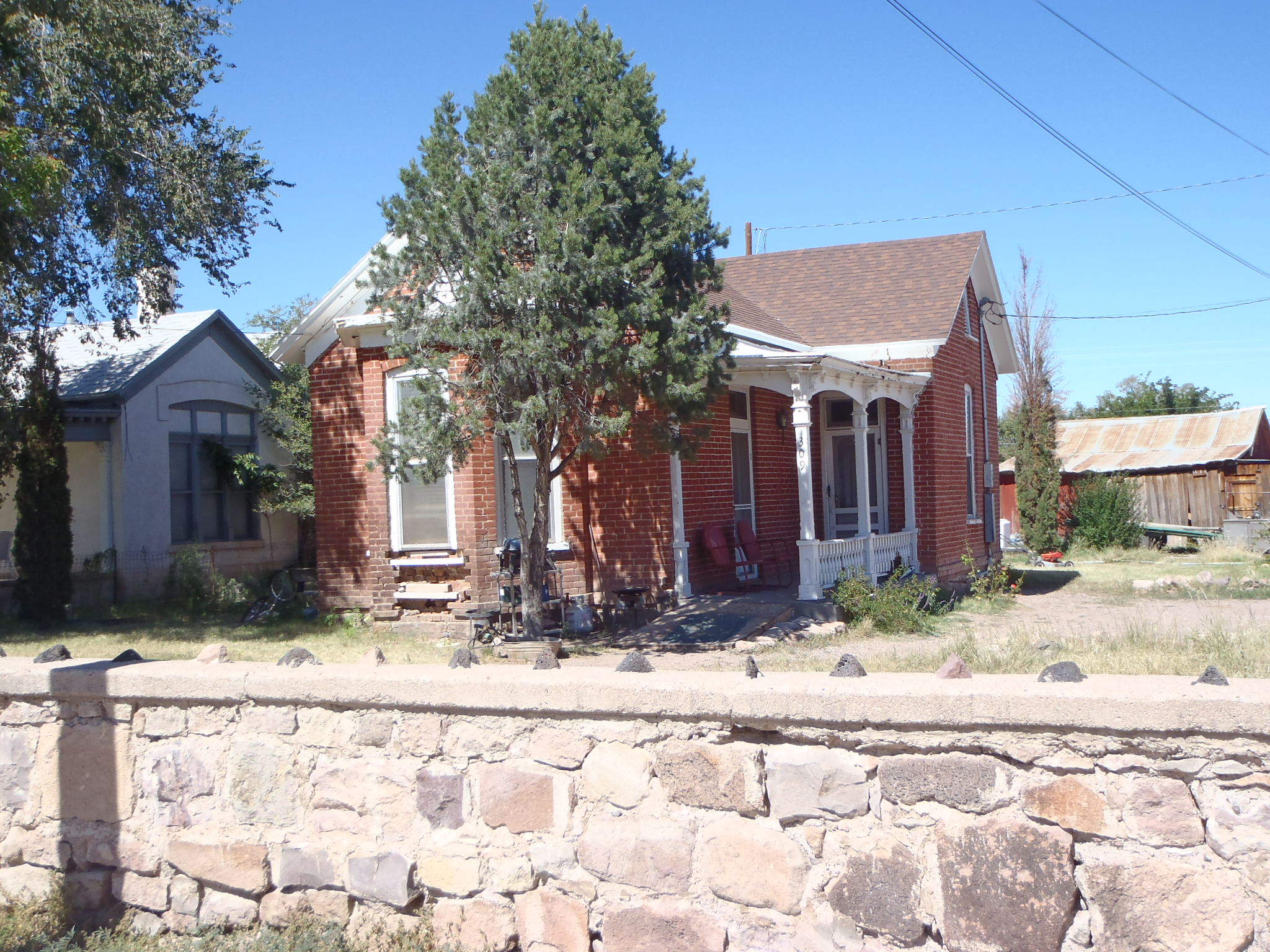

- Location within New Mexico
- Location: 313 McCutcheon Ave., Socorro, New Mexico
- Coordinates: 34°03′19″N 106°53′41″W
- Area: less than one acre
- Built: c.1893
- Architectural style: Late Victorian, Vernacular brick
- MPS: Domestic Architecture in Socorro MPS
- NRHP reference No.: 91000034
- Added to NRHP: February 20, 1991

The Nestor P. Eaton House, at 313 McCutcheon Ave. in Socorro, New Mexico, dates from around 1893. It was listed on the National Register of Historic Places in 1991.

It is a one-story brick building, with a flat-roofed front porch supported by three chamfered posts.
