= Steve Eaton =

English footballer

Personal information
- Full name: Stephen Paul Eaton
- Date of birth: 25 December 1959 (age 66)
- Place of birth: Liverpool, England
- Position: Full back

Senior career*
Years	Team	Apps	(Gls)
1978–1979	Tranmere Rovers	1	(0)
- * Club domestic league appearances and goals

Steve Eaton (born 25 December 1959) is an English footballer, who played as a full back in the Football League for Tranmere Rovers during the 1978–79 season. Eaton also played for Telford United. After leaving football, Eaton went on to refereeing and then later on in life working for Ford.
