= Union, Oregon =

- City
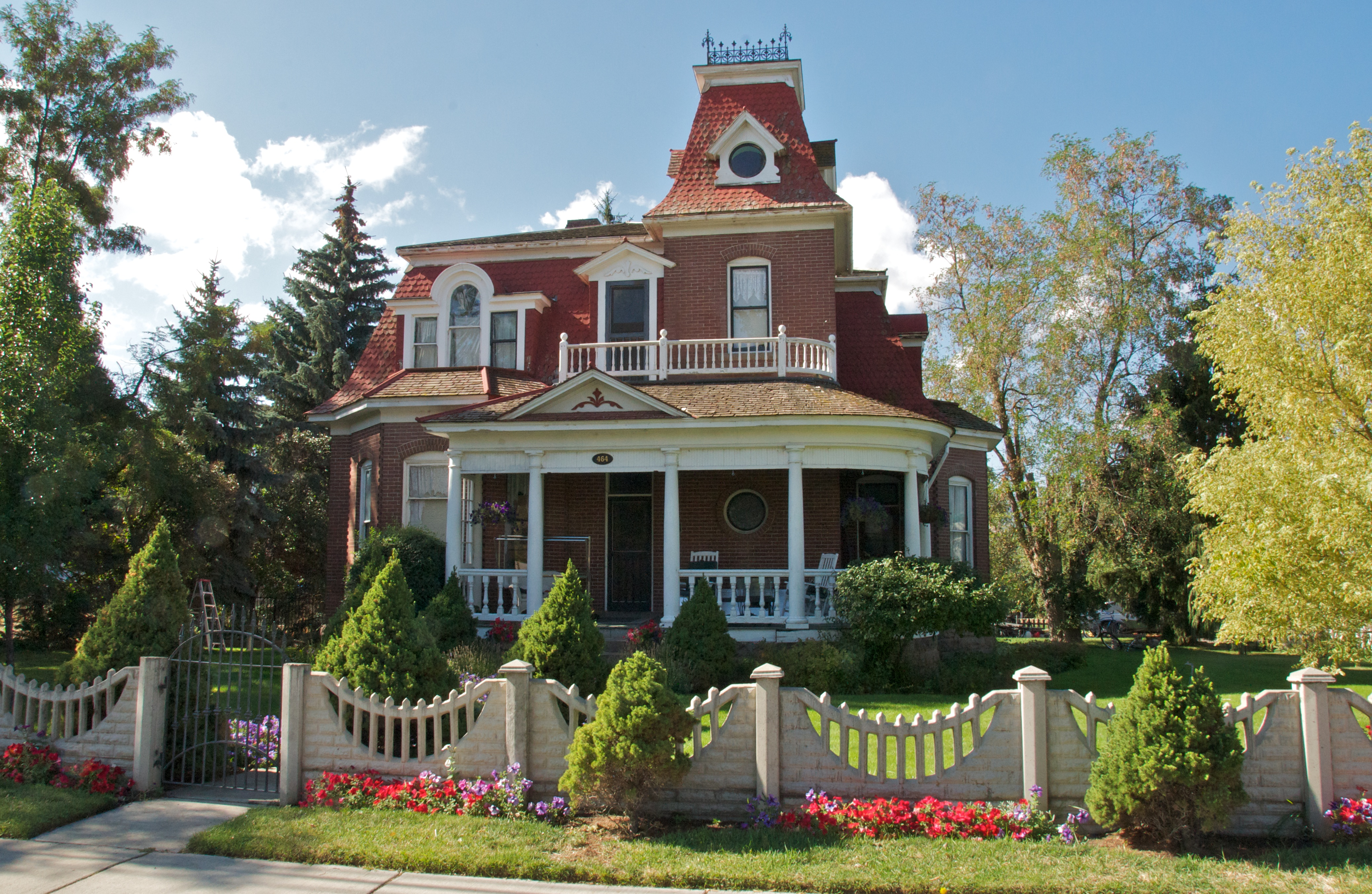
- The Eaton House, a Victorian home in the Union Main Street Historic District
- Motto: "City of Victorian Heritage"
- Location in Oregon
- Coordinates: 45°12′32″N 117°52′05″W
- Country: United States
- State: Oregon
- County: Union
- Incorporated: 1878

Government
  - Mayor: Susan Hawkins

Area
  - Total: 2.49 sq mi (6.45 km^{2})
  - Land: 2.49 sq mi (6.45 km^{2})
  - Water: 0 sq mi (0.00 km^{2})
- Elevation: 2,786 ft (849 m)

Population (2020)
  - Total: 2,152
  - Density: 864.6/sq mi (333.84/km^{2})
- Time zone: UTC-8 (Pacific)
  - Summer (DST): UTC-7 (Pacific)
- ZIP code: 97883
- Area code: 541
- FIPS code: 41-75850
- GNIS feature ID: 2412129
- Website: www.cityofunionor.gov

Union is a city in Union County, Oregon, United States, originally platted in 1864, and located 15 miles (24 km) southeast of La Grande. It is the namesake of Union County, which references the Union states, or Northern States, of the American Civil War. The population was 2,152 at the 2020 census. The city is known for the numerous historic Victorian homes that line its Main Street, some of which are registered on the National Register of Historic Places. It is also home to Oregon State University's Eastern Oregon Agricultural Research Center, founded in 1888, which is contemporarily housed in the former Union train station.

== History ==
Union was platted on November 11, 1864 along the Oregon Trail. The name references the Union states, or Northern States, of the American Civil War.

La Grande was named the county seat when Union County was created in 1865. Due to the Thomas and Ruckle Road going through Union, it elected the county seat in 1872, but when the railroad was built it was put through La Grande instead of Union. La Grande became the bigger town within the county and regained the county seat in 1902. J. W. Shelton, a local attorney, chartered the Union Electric Power and Light Company in March 1890 to bring the railroad from Union Junction (2.5 miles away) to Union itself. The company was renamed the Union Railway Company in July 1890, and the rail spur was built into Union by August 1892. Shelton planned to build more lines, had a fight with his company partners (the Hutchinsons), then two competing firms were formed: Shelton's The Union Railway in January 1893, and Hutchinsons' Union Street Railway and Suburban Railway. Both companies competed to buy the Union Railway Company. Shelton maintained control until August 1905, when The Union Railway was renamed to the Union, Cove and Valley Railway. This company was bought the following year by a timber company from the East Coast.

During the 2006 November elections, Kyle Corbin, an 18-year-old college student, was elected mayor after a successful write-in campaign. He had promised to bring an end to the political chaos that had plagued the town for the last two years, which included three councilmen and mayor Deborah Clark being removed in recall elections. "I know the procedures and rules," he told an Oregonian reporter. "I've run a meeting with a bunch of high school kids." Since then, one newspaper reports that "talk around town about whether the young mayor will succeed ranges from skepticism to sunny optimism."

== Geography ==
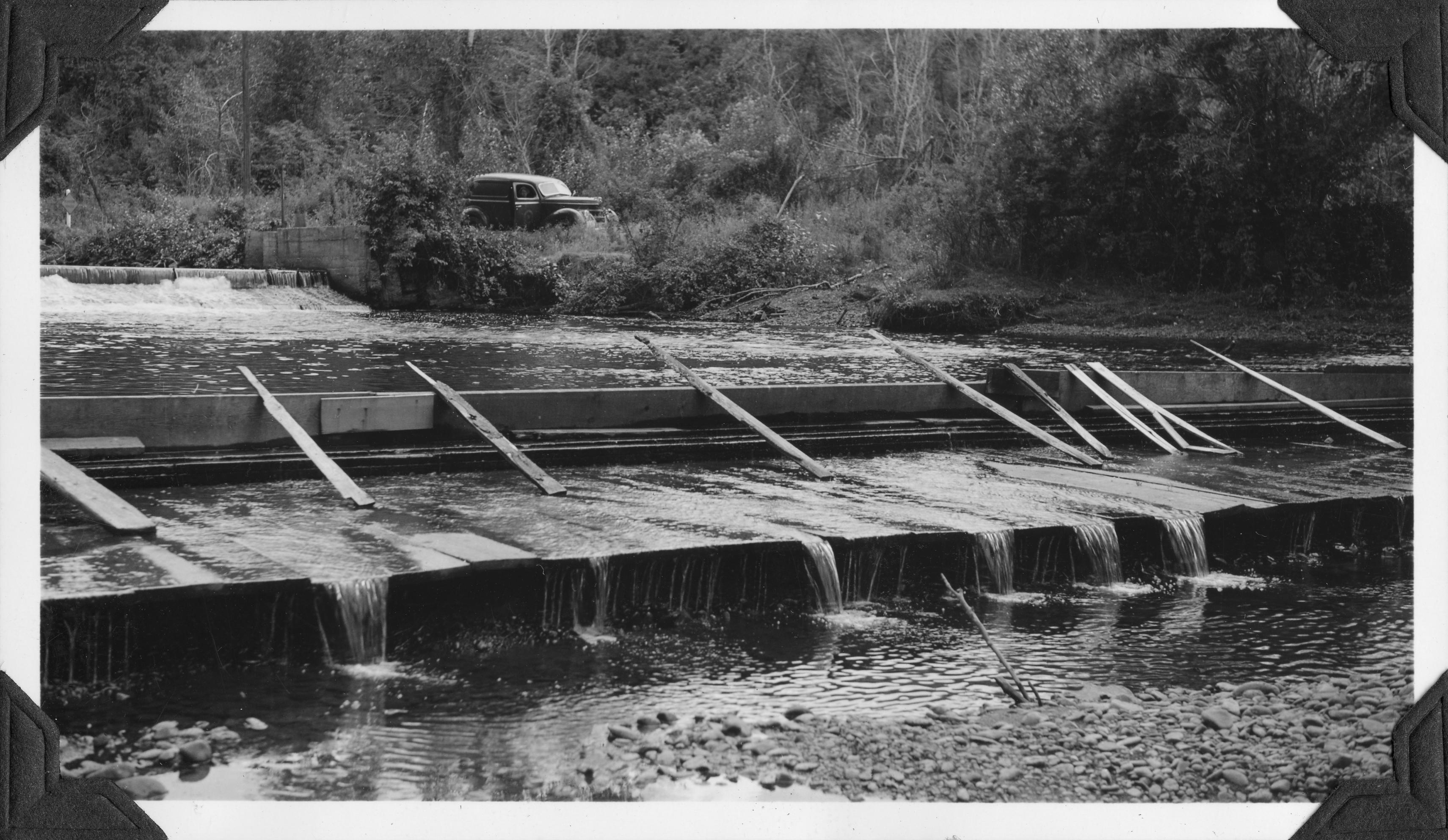
Catherine Creek diversion dam in Union.

Union lies in the extreme southeast corner of the Grande Ronde Valley near the western edge of the Wallowa Mountains. Oregon Route 237 runs through the city between Cove to the north and North Powder to the south. Oregon Route 203 also passes through Union, linking it to La Grande, about 20 miles (32 km) to the northwest. Catherine Creek, a tributary of the Grande Ronde River, passes through the city.

According to the United States Census Bureau, the city has a total area of 2.50 square miles (6.47 km^{2}), all of it land.

=== Climate ===
Climate data for Union Experiment Station, Oregon (1981–2010 normals, extremes 1911–2011)
Month	Jan	Feb	Mar	Apr	May	Jun	Jul	Aug	Sep	Oct	Nov	Dec	Year
Record high °F (°C)	61 (16)	67 (19)	77 (25)	90 (32)	95 (35)	101 (38)	105 (41)	108 (42)	101 (38)	89 (32)	74 (23)	62 (17)	108 (42)
Mean daily maximum °F (°C)	38.5 (3.6)	43.5 (6.4)	52.3 (11.3)	59.0 (15.0)	66.8 (19.3)	74.4 (23.6)	84.9 (29.4)	85.7 (29.8)	76.3 (24.6)	62.7 (17.1)	47.3 (8.5)	38.1 (3.4)	60.8 (16.0)
Daily mean °F (°C)	32.0 (0.0)	35.2 (1.8)	41.6 (5.3)	46.8 (8.2)	53.7 (12.1)	60.4 (15.8)	67.7 (19.8)	67.5 (19.7)	58.9 (14.9)	48.4 (9.1)	38.9 (3.8)	31.3 (−0.4)	48.5 (9.2)
Mean daily minimum °F (°C)	25.4 (−3.7)	26.8 (−2.9)	30.9 (−0.6)	34.6 (1.4)	40.7 (4.8)	46.4 (8.0)	50.5 (10.3)	49.3 (9.6)	41.6 (5.3)	34.1 (1.2)	30.6 (−0.8)	24.5 (−4.2)	36.3 (2.4)
Record low °F (°C)	−27 (−33)	−21 (−29)	−3 (−19)	9 (−13)	20 (−7)	29 (−2)	32 (0)	28 (−2)	18 (−8)	7 (−14)	−12 (−24)	−24 (−31)	−27 (−33)
Average precipitation inches (mm)	1.17 (30)	0.91 (23)	1.23 (31)	1.51 (38)	2.16 (55)	1.58 (40)	0.67 (17)	0.70 (18)	0.67 (17)	1.08 (27)	1.56 (40)	1.16 (29)	14.40 (366)
Average snowfall inches (cm)	6.0 (15)	3.0 (7.6)	1.3 (3.3)	0.5 (1.3)	0.1 (0.25)	0.0 (0.0)	0.0 (0.0)	0.0 (0.0)	0.0 (0.0)	trace	2.1 (5.3)	4.8 (12)	17.8 (45)
Average precipitation days (≥ 0.01 in)	11.8	9.2	11.9	11.9	12.2	9.2	4.4	4.4	5.1	8.5	13.4	11.7	113.7
Average snowy days (≥ 0.1 in)	5.7	3.1	1.9	0.6	0.1	0.0	0.0	0.0	0.0	0.1	2.1	5.0	18.6
Source: NOAA

== Demographics ==
Historical population
Census	Pop.	Note	%±
1880	416		—
1890	604		45.2%
1900	937		55.1%
1910	1,483		58.3%
1920	1,319		−11.1%
1930	1,107		−16.1%
1940	1,398		26.3%
1950	1,307		−6.5%
1960	1,490		14.0%
1970	1,531		2.8%
1980	2,062		34.7%
1990	1,847		−10.4%
2000	1,926		4.3%
2010	2,121		10.1%
2020	2,152		1.5%
U.S. Decennial Census

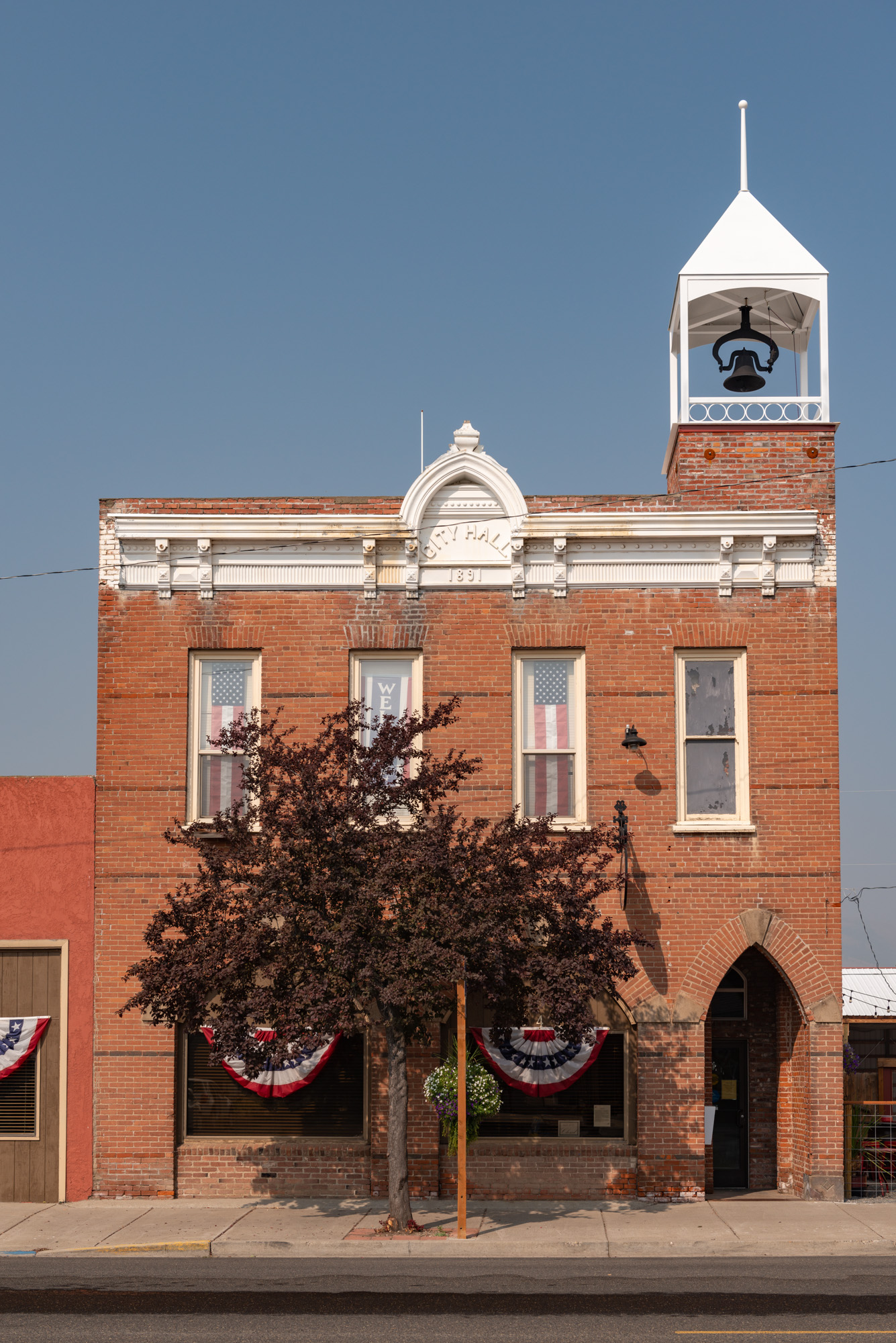
Union City Hall

=== 2020 census ===
As of the 2020 census, Union had a population of 2,152; the median age was 43.5 years, 24.1% of residents were under the age of 18, and 22.3% were 65 years of age or older. For every 100 females there were 103.8 males, and for every 100 females age 18 and over there were 99.8 males age 18 and over.

0% of residents lived in urban areas, while 100.0% lived in rural areas.

There were 877 households in Union, of which 27.0% had children under the age of 18 living in them. Of all households, 50.2% were married-couple households, 19.7% were households with a male householder and no spouse or partner present, and 21.8% were households with a female householder and no spouse or partner present. About 28.2% of all households were made up of individuals and 13.9% had someone living alone who was 65 years of age or older.

There were 956 housing units, of which 8.3% were vacant. Among occupied housing units, 74.8% were owner-occupied and 25.2% were renter-occupied. The homeowner vacancy rate was 1.8% and the rental vacancy rate was 9.0%.

Racial composition as of the 2020 census
Race	Number	Percent
White	1,942	90.2%
Black or African American	10	0.5%
American Indian and Alaska Native	23	1.1%
Asian	12	0.6%
Native Hawaiian and Other Pacific Islander	0	0%
Some other race	30	1.4%
Two or more races	135	6.3%
Hispanic or Latino (of any race)	69	3.2%

=== 2010 census ===
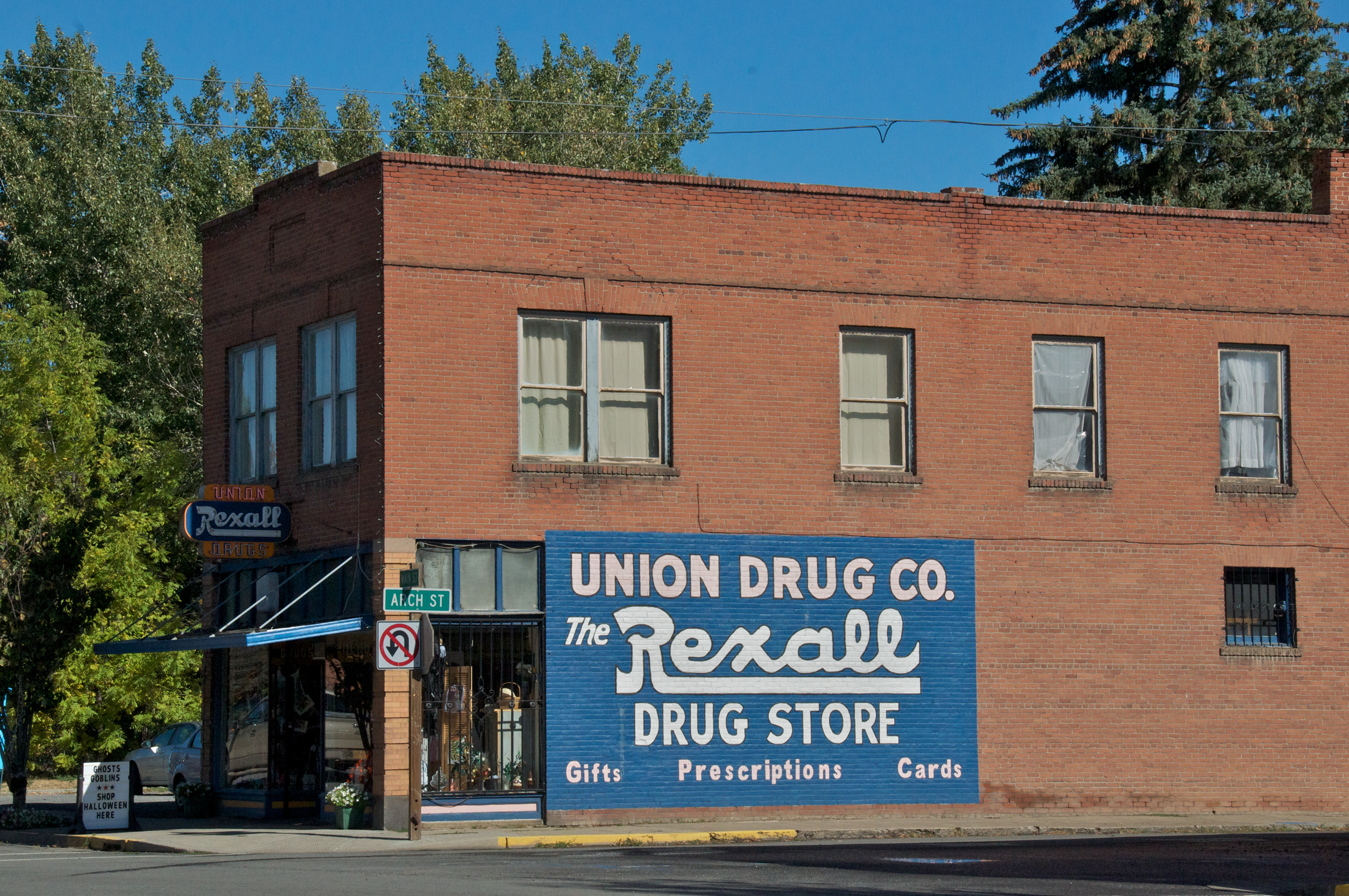
Union Rexall Drugstore

As of the census of 2010, there were 2,121 people, 859 households, and 603 families residing in the city. The population density was 848.4 inhabitants per square mile (327.6/km^{2}). There were 933 housing units at an average density of 373.2 per square mile (144.1/km^{2}). The racial makeup of the city was 95.6% White, 0.1% African American, 1.1% Native American, 0.1% Asian, 0.1% Pacific Islander, 0.6% from other races, and 2.3% from two or more races. Hispanic or Latino of any race were 2.3% of the population.

There were 859 households, of which 31.4% had children under the age of 18 living with them, 56.7% were married couples living together, 9.3% had a female householder with no husband present, 4.2% had a male householder with no wife present, and 29.8% were non-families. 24.9% of all households were made up of individuals, and 12.1% had someone living alone who was 65 years of age or older. The average household size was 2.46 and the average family size was 2.93.

The median age in the city was 43.8 years. 24.7% of residents were under the age of 18; 5.9% were between the ages of 18 and 24; 20.6% were from 25 to 44; 30.8% were from 45 to 64; and 17.9% were 65 years of age or older. The gender makeup of the city was 49.2% male and 50.8% female.

=== 2000 census ===
As of the census of 2000, there were 1,926 people, 766 households, and 550 families residing in the city. The population density was 773.0 inhabitants per square mile (298.5/km^{2}). There were 821 housing units at an average density of 329.5 per square mile (127.2/km^{2}). The racial makeup of the city was 96.21% White, 0.10% African American, 0.99% Native American, 0.36% Asian, 0.05% Pacific Islander, 0.73% from other races, and 1.56% from two or more races. Hispanic or Latino of any race were 1.30% of the population.

There were 766 households, out of which 30.5% had children under the age of 18 living with them, 59.5% were married couples living together, 9.0% had a female householder with no husband present, and 28.1% were non-families. 24.0% of all households were made up of individuals, and 12.4% had someone living alone who was 65 years of age or older. The average household size was 2.51 and the average family size was 2.97.

In the city, the population was spread out, with 26.0% under the age of 18, 6.0% from 18 to 24, 24.5% from 25 to 44, 25.4% from 45 to 64, and 18.2% who were 65 years of age or older. The median age was 41 years. For every 100 females, there were 92.0 males. For every 100 females age 18 and over, there were 89.6 males.

The median income for a household in the city was $28,529, and the median income for a family was $34,286. Males had a median income of $32,148 versus $16,776 for females. The per capita income for the city was $14,406. About 12.2% of families and 13.0% of the population were below the poverty line, including 16.3% of those under age 18 and 16.0% of those age 65 or over.

== Education ==
It is within Union School District 5.

Union County is not in the boundary of any community college district.

== See also ==
- Union Main Street Historic District
