= Amasa, Michigan =

- Census-designated place (CDP) & unincorporated community
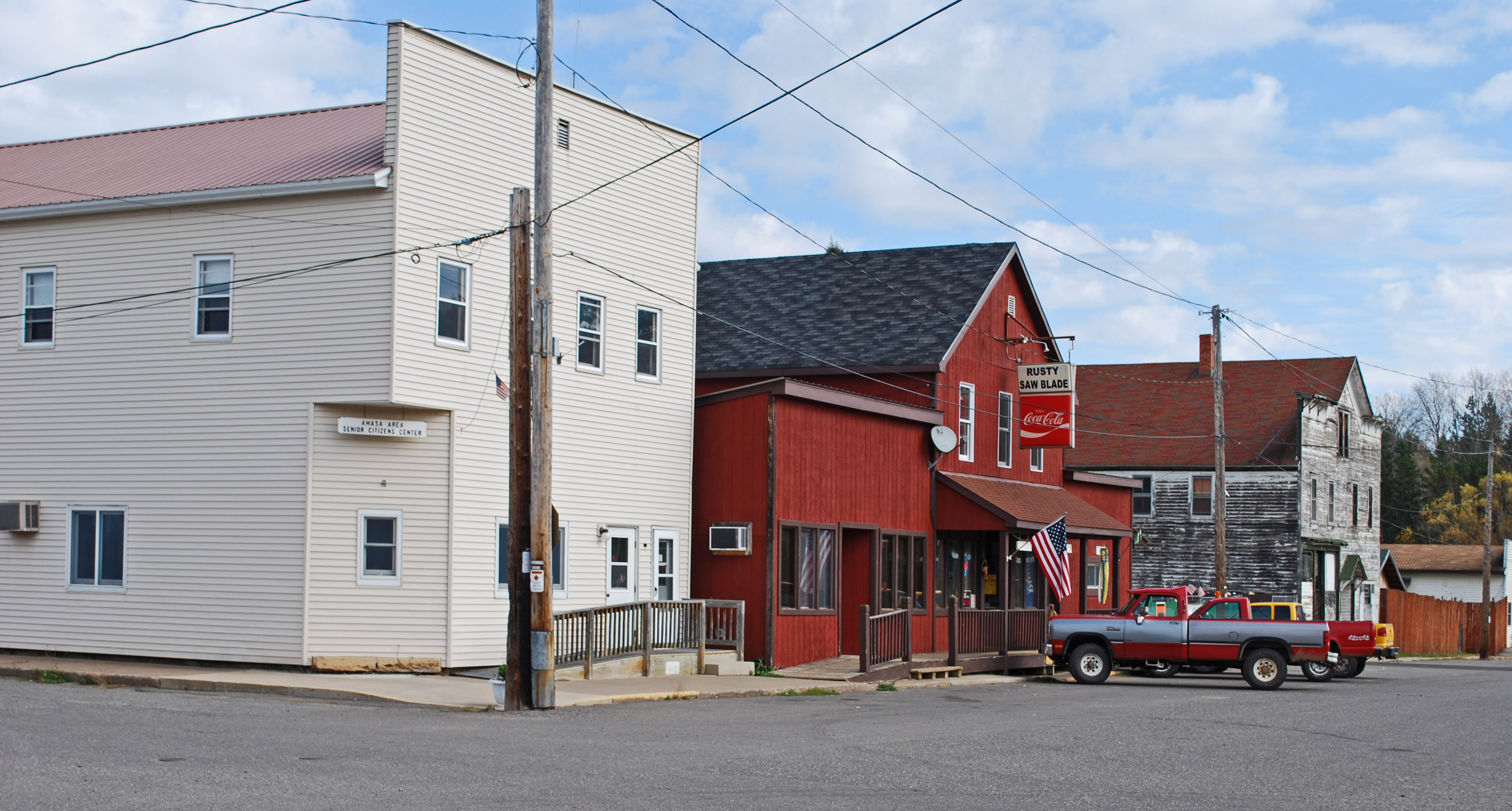
- Looking west along W. Pine Street

- Location within the state of Michigan Location within the United States
- Coordinates: 46°13′58″N 88°27′1″W
- Country: United States
- State: Michigan
- County: Iron
- Township: Hematite
- Settled: 1888
- Platted: 1890

Area
  - Total: 4.04 sq mi (10.47 km^{2})
  - Land: 4.03 sq mi (10.45 km^{2})
  - Water: 0.0077 sq mi (0.02 km^{2})
- Elevation: 1,441 ft (439 m)

Population (2020)
  - Total: 195
  - Density: 48.3/sq mi (18.66/km^{2})
- Time zone: UTC-6 (Central (CST))
  - Summer (DST): UTC-5 (CDT)
- ZIP code(s): 49903
- Area code: 906
- FIPS code: 26-01960
- GNIS feature ID: 0620044

Amasa (/æm.əsə/ AM-ə-sə) is an unincorporated community and census-designated place (CDP) in Iron County in the U.S. state of Michigan. The population of the CDP was 195 at the 2020 census. The community is located within Hematite Township.

== History ==
Matthew Gibson and his son J. Thoburn Gibson discovered iron croppings along the shores of the Hemlock River in 1888, and the Hemlock River Mining Company took over the area two years later when sufficient amounts of iron were found. The company platted the community in 1890. The community was first named Hemlock but was renamed after Amasa Stone, who was the father-in-law of Col. Henry S. Pickands. The name change was suggested by the Pickands Mather Group. The community received a station along the Chicago & Northwestern Railroad and a post office opened here on March 7, 1891.

== Geography ==
According to the U.S. Census Bureau, the CDP has a total area of 4.04 square miles (10.46 km^{2}), of which 4.03 square miles (10.44 km^{2}) is land and 0.01 square miles (0.03 km^{2}) (0.25%) is water.

The Hemlock River, which is a tributary of Paint River, flows through Amasa.

=== Major highways ===
- US 141 runs south–north along the western edge of the community.

=== Climate ===
Climate data for Amasa 1W, Michigan, 1991–2020 normals: 1470ft (448m)
| Month | Jan | Feb | Mar | Apr | May | Jun | Jul | Aug | Sep | Oct | Nov | Dec | Year |
|---|---|---|---|---|---|---|---|---|---|---|---|---|---|
| Record high °F (°C) | 50 (10) | 61 (16) | 79 (26) | 85 (29) | 91 (33) | 98 (37) | 98 (37) | 95 (35) | 95 (35) | 85 (29) | 75 (24) | 62 (17) | 98 (37) |
| Mean maximum °F (°C) | 39.8 (4.3) | 46.1 (7.8) | 58.8 (14.9) | 73.3 (22.9) | 83.3 (28.5) | 88.6 (31.4) | 90.3 (32.4) | 87.4 (30.8) | 82.8 (28.2) | 74.3 (23.5) | 58.0 (14.4) | 44.7 (7.1) | 90.6 (32.6) |
| Mean daily maximum °F (°C) | 21.7 (−5.7) | 25.9 (−3.4) | 36.7 (2.6) | 49.5 (9.7) | 64.8 (18.2) | 73.7 (23.2) | 78.6 (25.9) | 76.3 (24.6) | 68.2 (20.1) | 53.6 (12.0) | 38.6 (3.7) | 26.7 (−2.9) | 51.2 (10.7) |
| Daily mean °F (°C) | 10.9 (−11.7) | 13.1 (−10.5) | 23.6 (−4.7) | 36.9 (2.7) | 50.8 (10.4) | 60.1 (15.6) | 64.6 (18.1) | 62.4 (16.9) | 55.0 (12.8) | 42.2 (5.7) | 29.5 (−1.4) | 17.5 (−8.1) | 38.9 (3.8) |
| Mean daily minimum °F (°C) | 0.0 (−17.8) | 0.4 (−17.6) | 10.4 (−12.0) | 24.2 (−4.3) | 36.8 (2.7) | 46.4 (8.0) | 50.7 (10.4) | 48.5 (9.2) | 41.8 (5.4) | 30.8 (−0.7) | 20.5 (−6.4) | 8.3 (−13.2) | 26.6 (−3.0) |
| Mean minimum °F (°C) | −22.1 (−30.1) | −24.0 (−31.1) | −17.8 (−27.7) | 7.4 (−13.7) | 22.3 (−5.4) | 31.8 (−0.1) | 38.5 (3.6) | 35.7 (2.1) | 28.7 (−1.8) | 18.9 (−7.3) | 3.4 (−15.9) | −15.4 (−26.3) | −27.8 (−33.2) |
| Record low °F (°C) | −41 (−41) | −47 (−44) | −31 (−35) | −15 (−26) | 14 (−10) | 27 (−3) | 31 (−1) | 32 (0) | 24 (−4) | 7 (−14) | −12 (−24) | −33 (−36) | −47 (−44) |
| Average precipitation inches (mm) | 1.32 (34) | 1.11 (28) | 1.73 (44) | 2.78 (71) | 3.07 (78) | 3.57 (91) | 3.89 (99) | 3.20 (81) | 3.63 (92) | 3.27 (83) | 2.14 (54) | 1.64 (42) | 31.35 (797) |
| Average snowfall inches (cm) | 20.7 (53) | 14.9 (38) | 11.7 (30) | 7.1 (18) | 0.4 (1.0) | 0.0 (0.0) | 0.0 (0.0) | 0.0 (0.0) | 0.0 (0.0) | 1.6 (4.1) | 8.5 (22) | 19.5 (50) | 84.4 (216.1) |
Source 1: NOAA
Source 2: XMACIS (1995-2020 snowfall, records & monthly max/mins)

== Demographics ==
In 2020, its population was 195.

Historical population
| Census | Pop. | Note | %± |
|---|---|---|---|
| 2010 | 283 | | — |
| 2020 | 195 | | −31.1% |
U.S. Decennial Census
