= Eaton, West Virginia =

Unincorporated community in West Virginia, United States

Eaton
- Unincorporated community
- Location within the state of West Virginia Eaton (the United States)
- Coordinates: 39°11′46″N 81°18′49″W
- Country: United States
- State: West Virginia
- County: Wood
- Elevation: 791 ft (241 m)
- Time zone: UTC-5 (Eastern (EST))
  - Summer (DST): UTC-4 (EDT)
- GNIS ID: 1554362

Eaton is a ghost town in Wood County, West Virginia, United States. It sat along the path of the Baltimore and Ohio Railroad. Passenger service along the line (not picking up at Eaton) stopped completely in the fall of 1981. Eaton's long abandoned train station burned in the mid 1980s. All rail service on the line was discontinued in 1988. The railroad tracks were removed in the 1990s and turned into part of the North Bend Rail Trail.

The town was named for a tunnel builder named Eaton.

== Tunnel accident ==
In the early 1960s work began on the tunnels, widening and raising the roofs. Eaton's tunnel (#21), which was originally built in 1867, collapsed on June 6, 1963, burying two workers. One was rescued safely, while the body of the second worker was never recovered. The old tunnel was deemed unsafe to continue and was sealed off. A new tunnel was dug parallel to the old. There is no marker commemorating the still buried worker. The tunnel has become a place visited by ghost hunters.

== Note ==
Please do not forget the trails are a part of the park system and those without renting a camping site may be ticketed if visiting after their visiting hours.
