= Daniel Isaac Vernon Eaton =

Canadian surveyor, soldier, and civil engineer (1869–1917)

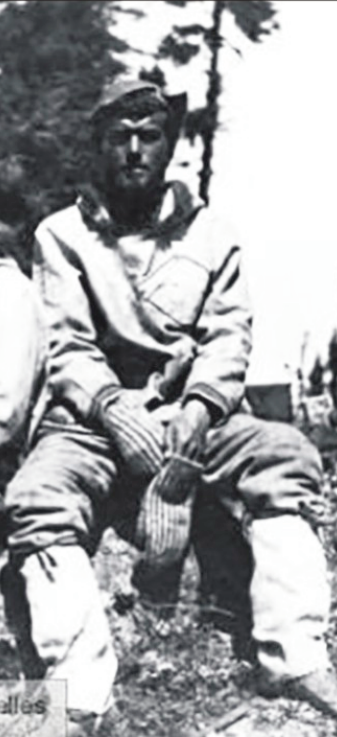
- Daniel Isaac Vernon Eaton, exploring central Labrador, in 1894.
- Born: September 19, 1869; Truro, Nova Scotia
- Died: April 11, 1917 (aged 47); Vimy Ridge, France
- Occupations: surveyor, civil engineer, geologist and military officer

Daniel Isaac Vernon Eaton (September 19, 1869 – April 11, 1917) was a Canadian surveyor, civil engineer, geologist and military officer. He served as Albert Peter Low's assistant, during a long expedition to explore Labrador, from 1894 to 1896.

He served as an officer during World War I, and died during the Battle of Vimy Ridge.

== Military career ==
Eaton joined the military reserves in 1887, when he was 18. He worked as a surveyor, geologist and explorer, until he joined the regular army in 1896. Eaton spent most of his military career as an artillery officer.

He served two hitches in the South Africa. Where he attracted the attention of senior officers. He served on a special mission under Robert Stephenson Smyth Baden-Powell.

In 1902 he was the "first colonial officer to attend the Staff College at Camberley, England."

He started World War I as a Battery Commander, and was promoted to command a Brigade.
