= Mylius–Eaton House =

Historic house in Iowa, United States

- U.S. National Register of Historic Places
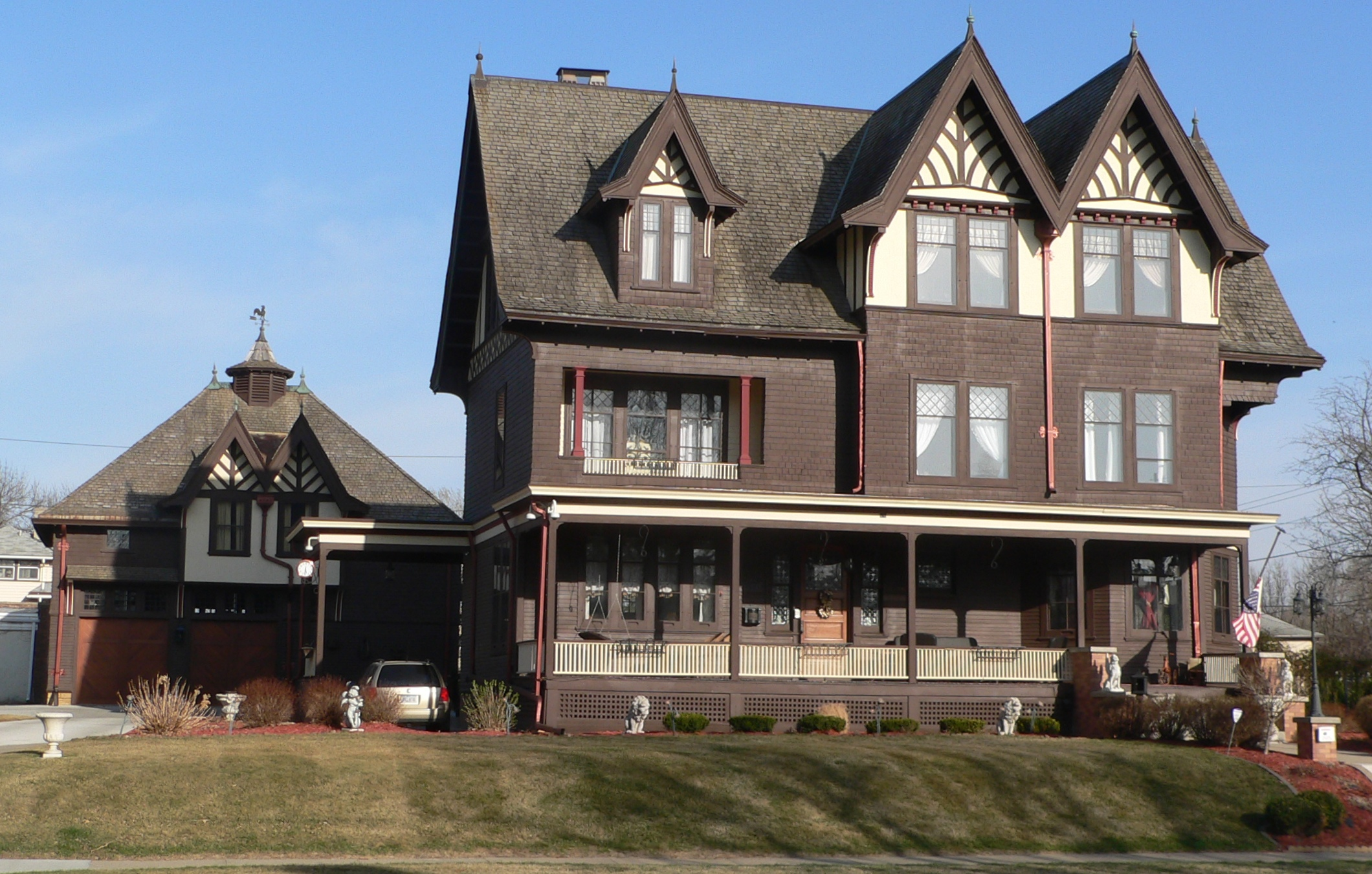

- Location within Iowa Location within the United States
- Location: 2900 Jackson St. Sioux City, Iowa
- Coordinates: 42°31′15.4″N 96°24′6.8″W
- Area: less than one acre
- Built: 1894
- Built by: Charles Mylius
- Architect: William D. McLaughlin
- Architectural style: Queen Anne
- NRHP reference No.: 03001390
- Added to NRHP: January 13, 2004

The Mylius–Eaton House is a historic building located in Sioux City, Iowa, United States. The house was built by Charles Mylius, who an Italian-born Englishman. Mylius, however, never lived here. That distinction belonged to Franz and Matilda Shenkberg, whose marriage ended in divorce and they sold the house in 1906 to Fred and Lillian Eaton. Eaton was a banker who became the president of the Sioux City Stock Yards, and he was involved in a variety of other businesses and organizations in the community. The house remained in the Eaton family until 1967.

The three-story frame Queen Anne house was designed by local architect William D. McLaughlin. It is influenced by the phase of the style developed by Richard Norman Shaw in England. The house has irregular massing with a vertical emphasis. It features clapboard on the first floor, shingles on the second floor, and half-timbering on the third. A full-length porch is located on the main facade, and a porte-cochère on the north elevation. Two porches were carved into the second floor, but one has been removed. The two-story carriage house behind was built after the main house, and is sympathetic in design. The two buildings were listed together on the National Register of Historic Places in 2004.
