= Eaton Hall, Herefordshire =

House in Leominster, Herefordshire, England

Coordinates: 52°13′06″N 2°43′13″W

Eaton Hall is a three-storey building in Leominster in Herefordshire, 1 mile to the south-east of the village church. It was historically sited in the parish of Leominster Out. It was recorded in 1934 as being two-storey, with stone and timber-framed walls and slate and tile roofs. It is Grade II listed.

It belonged to the Hackluyt family - John Leland states that William Hackluyt built a house in Leominster, though the existing building seems to date to the mid-1300s. It centred on a great hall with a timber-frame roof and cross-wings at both the east and west ends. Most of the hall survives, including a west solar wing in stone. At an unknown date the hall was divided into two storeys and stone-facings placed on the walls. The buttery wing was extended to the north, probably in the early 1400s and the buttery-wing and screens were later rebuilt, probably in the 18th century.

An outbuilding still survived in 1934, formed of a barn and a 17th-century cottage converted into stables.
