= Van Eaton =

Surname list

Van Eaton is the surname of the following people

- Charles Van Eaton (1889–1974), American politician in Iowa
- Henry Smith Van Eaton (1826–1898), American politician in Mississippi
- Guy Franklin Van Eaton (1878–1950), Canadian politician in Saskatchewan
- Jimmy Van Eaton (born 1937), American drummer and singer
- Lon & Derrek Van Eaton, American vocal and multi-instrumentalist duo
- T. C. Van Eaton (1862–1951), American politician in Washington State

== See also ==
- Eaton (surname)
