= James Youman Eaton =

American teacher, lawyer and politician

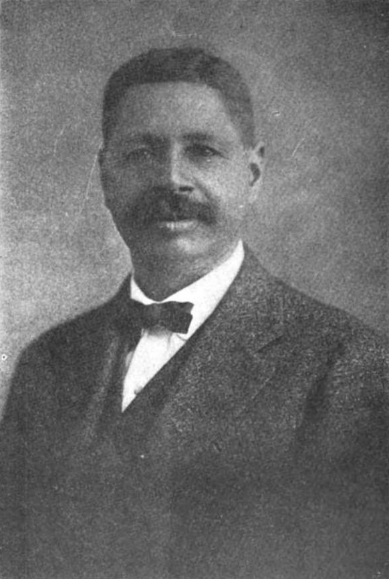

Member of the North Carolina House of Representatives from Vance County
- In office 1899–1900

Personal details
- Born: 1866 Louisburg, North Carolina
- Died: June 27, 1928 (aged 61–62)
- Party: Republican
- Education: Shaw University

James Youman Eaton (1866 – June 27, 1928) was an American teacher, lawyer, and politician.

== Early life ==
James Youman Eaton was born in 1866 in Louisburg, North Carolina to Thomas R. and Annie Burwell Eaton. His parents were former slaves and after emancipation were economically successful, having acquired 700 acres of land by the mid-1870s. Following graduation from the Boydton Academic and Bible Institute, Eaton earned a bachelor of laws degree from Shaw University in 1894 and passed the state bar exam that September. On June 30, 1900, he married Mary Agnes Cooper. They had five children together.

== Career ==
After graduating from law school, Eaton opened a legal practice in Henderson. From 1897 to 1898 he served as a county attorney for Vance County. As a young adult he taught at a school in Townsville and served two years as principal of a school in Buffalo Lithia Springs, Virginia. He was elected as president of the Vance County Colored Teachers' Association at its formation on April 9, 1898. The following year he founded and became principal of the Central Colored Graded School in Henderson.

Eaton was selected to run for a seat in the North Carolina House of Representatives on the Republican ticket in September 1898. He won the seat to represent Vance County in the November election. He served in 1899 and 1900. During the 1899 session, in which he was one of only three black representatives, he served on a subcommittee of the legislature's joint Committee of Institutions for the Insane. He proposed four local bills before the House, two of which passed; one bill shortened the May sitting of the Superior Court in Vance County, while the other provided for compensation to two black schoolteachers. He also introduced a petition made by colored citizens requesting equal school term lengths for black and white students, which was referred to the Committee on Education and not further studied. He spoke against the introduction of a literacy test for registering voters and voted against removing black politician James H. Young's name from the cornerstone of the Asylum for the Deaf and Dumb and the Blind.

== Later life ==
Eaton died on June 27, 1928 from heart issues stemming from an illness. A funeral was held for him in Henderson on July 3 and his body was interred in a family plot in Blacknall Cemetery. The Eaton-Johnson Middle School in Henderson was partly named in his honor.

== Works cited ==
- Caldwell, A. B., ed. (1921). History of the American Negro : North Carolina Edition. Atlanta: A. B. Caldwell Publishing Company.
- Edmonds, Helen G. (2013). The Negro and Fusion Politics in North Carolina, 1894-1901 (revised ed.). Chapel Hill: The University of North Carolina Press. ISBN 9781469610955.
- Vann, Andre (2000). Vance County, North Carolina. Black America. Arcadia Publishing. ISBN 9780738506630.
