= Eaton, Wisconsin =

Eaton is the name of some places in the U.S. state of Wisconsin:

- Eaton, Brown County, Wisconsin
- Eaton, Clark County, Wisconsin
- Eaton, Manitowoc County, Wisconsin
