= Eaton's agar =

Type of growth media

Eaton's agar is a type of agar media used to grow Mycoplasma pneumoniae, which was originally called "Eaton's agent" after its isolation by Monroe Eaton in 1944.

One recipe for the cultivation of M. pneumoniae (Eaton's agar) includes (v/v):

- 70% Difco PPLO (pleuropneumonia-like organism) agar or broth base
- 20% unheated horse serum
- 10% fresh aqueous extract of baker's yeast
- 1000 units/ml Penicillin G

The original recipe by Chanock, Hayflick, and Barile included 500 units/mL penicillin.
