= Tarr–Eaton House =

Historic house in Maine, United States

- U.S. National Register of Historic Places
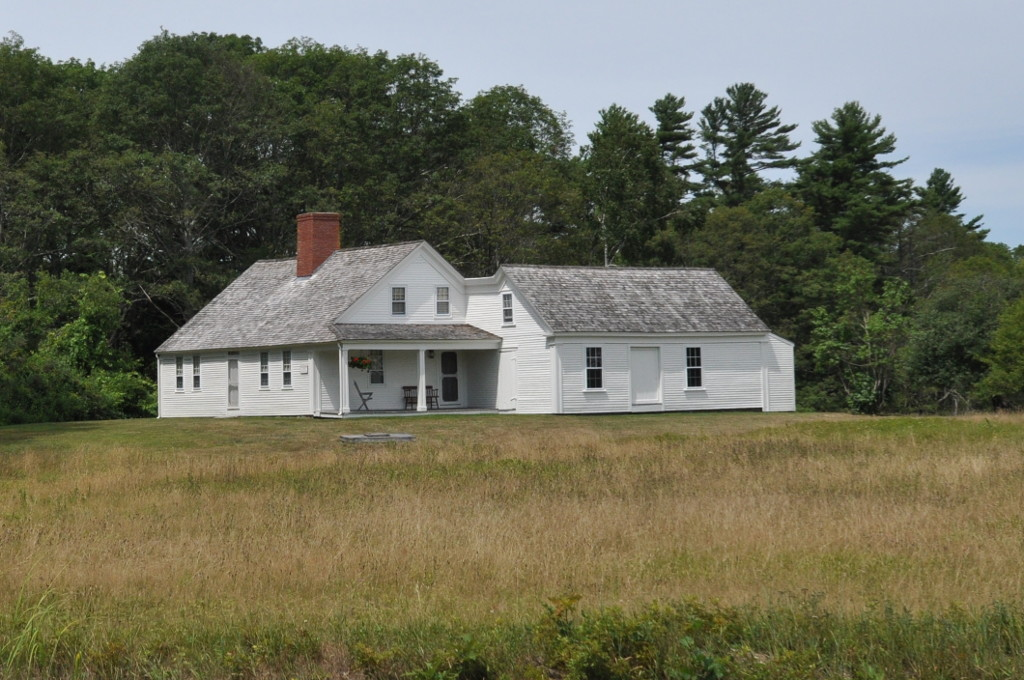

- Location within Maine Location within the United States
- Location: 906 Harpswell Neck Rd., Harpswell, Maine
- Coordinates: 43°48′2″N 69°59′14″W
- Area: 2 acres (0.81 ha)
- Built: c. 1783, 1840
- Architectural style: Greek Revival, Federal
- NRHP reference No.: 01001416
- Added to NRHP: December 31, 2001

The Tarr–Eaton House is an historic house at 906 Harpswell Neck Road in Harpswell, Maine. Built before 1783 and enlarged about 1840, it is a well-preserved 18th-century Cape with added Greek Revival features, and one of Harpswell's few surviving pre-Revolutionary War buildings. It was listed on the National Register of Historic Places in 2001.

== Description and history ==
The Tarr–Eaton House stands in Harpswell Center, on the west side of Harpswell Neck Road (Maine State Route 123), in a field just north of the 1750 Harpswell Meetinghouse, a National Historic Landmark. It is a single-story wood frame structure, with a side gable roof, a large central chimney, five-bay facade, clapboarded exterior, and a foundation of concrete and rubblestone. A single-story shed-roof ell extends northward from its rear northeast corner. The main facade faces south, consisting of four windows with simple surrounds, two on either side of the main entrance, which is topped by a four-light transom window. A porch extends across the eastern facade, supported by simple square posts. The interior has a typical center-chimney plan, with the entry vestibule housing a narrow and steep winding staircase, with parlor spaces to either side, and the kitchen behind. Fireplaces feature Federal period mantels, and the interior retains other period finishes.

The house was probably built sometime before 1783, the year in which William and Elizabeth Tarr's first child was born. It was the farmstead for a farm of over 100 acres (40 ha). Tarr was a veteran of the American Revolutionary War, and is also recorded as operating a tavern in the town and serving as its constable. Tarr sold his property to Joseph Eaton in 1811, a relative of the ministers Elijah and Samuel Eaton who served at the adjacent 1758 Harpswell Meeting House, and it remained in the Eaton family until 1908 when John Hackett, a hired hand, purchased the property from Emeline Eaton. The house and two acres were given to the Harpswell Historical Society in 1982, which resold it into private ownership with protective covenants.

== See also ==
- National Register of Historic Places listings in Cumberland County, Maine
