= Roger Eaton =

South-African born Australian businessman

Roger Eaton is an Australian businessman, former chief executive officer of KFC. and currently an independent director of Molson Coors Brewing Company.

Born in South Africa, Eaton moved to Australia in 1984. Prior to becoming president and chief concept officer of KFC, he was senior vice president/managing director of YUM! Restaurants International South Pacific from 2000 to 2008.

In April 2009, he appeared in an American commercial promoting the introduction of Kentucky Grilled Chicken to the KFC menu. In May 2009, he appeared again in an American commercial to announce the ending of the free Kentucky Grilled Chicken that was promoted earlier. Due to "overwhelming success", the company could not afford to honor the coupons, and Eaton had to announce later compensation for the coupons.
