= Joseph Oriel Eaton =

American painter

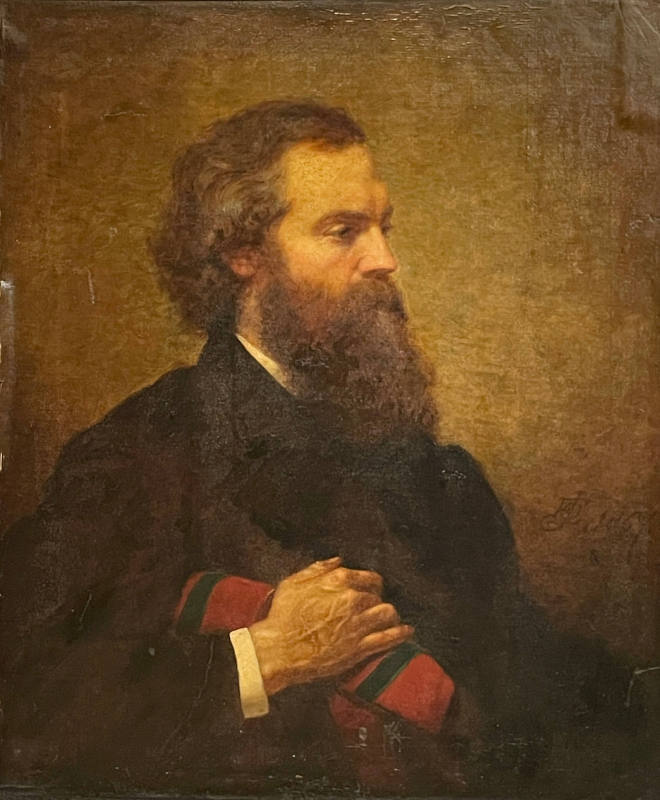
- Self-portrait, 1867
- Born: February 8, 1829; Newark, Ohio, U.S.
- Died: February 7, 1875 (aged 45); Yonkers, New York, U.S.
- Spouse: Emmaline Goodwin
- Children: 7, including Joseph II

Joseph Oriel Eaton (February 8, 1829 – February 7, 1875) was an American painter of portraits and figure subjects, both in oil and in water-colours. His most famous work is his portrait of Herman Melville, author of the 1851 novel Moby-Dick.

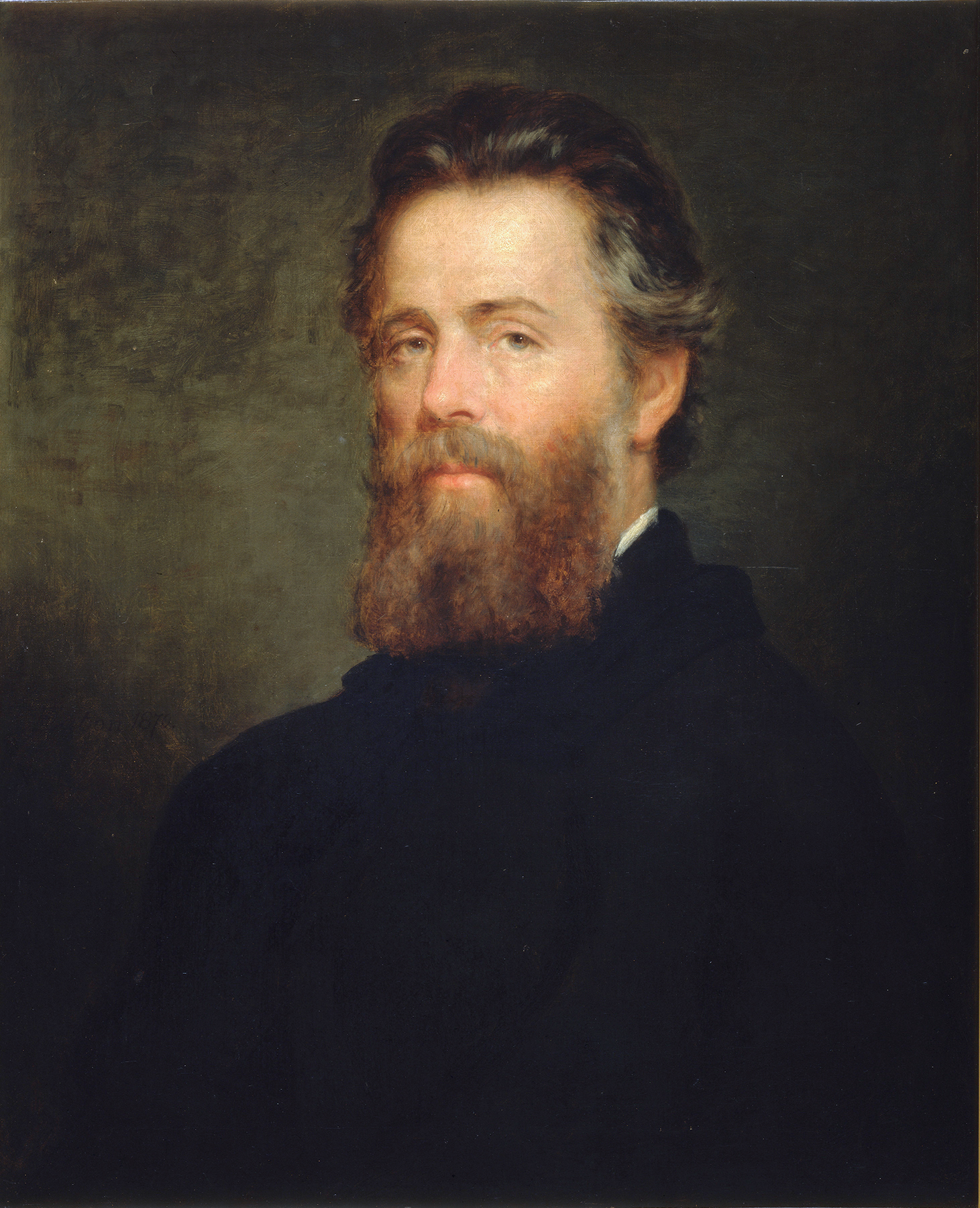
Eaton's 1870 portrait of Herman Melville

== Personal life ==
He was married to Emmaline (Emma) Goodwin, great-granddaughter of John Adams, and granddaughter of John Quincy Adams. The Eatons had seven children:

- Son, Frank
- Son, William
- Son, Charles Sedgwick Eaton (c. 1856-1911)
- Daughter, Frances Goodman Eaton (c. 1864 - 1903), married to Simón Bolívar Camacho (1859-1906), the great grand-nephew of Simón Bolívar, the Liberator, and the son of a Venezuelan diplomat
- Daughter, Mary Nelson (c. 1869 – 1948), married Frank Howard Nelson on June 6, 1907, in Montclair, New Jersey.
- Daughter, Margaret (c. 1858-1931), married to Swedish Count Henning Gustave Taube, who was a co-founder of Eaton Corporation and brother of Swedish Prime Minister Arvid Taube.
- Son, Harrison, but later known as Joseph Oriel Eaton II, born 1873 and a co-founder of Eaton Corporation

A granddaughter named Margaret Camacho was married to John Stoye on November 6, 1911.

== Works ==
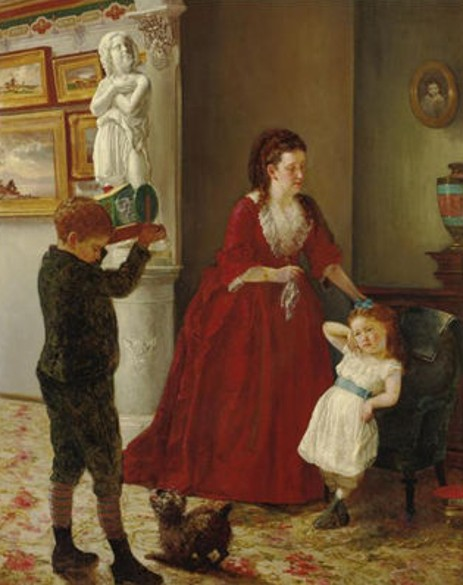
Mother and Children in an Interior

Among his exhibited works were:

- Landscape: View on the Hudson. 1868.
- Multiple portraits of John Means of Kentucky. 1868
- Greek Water-Carrier. 1872.
- Lady Godiva. 1874.
- Looking through the Kaleidoscope. 1875.
- His own Portrait. 1875. (National Academy of Design)
- A portrait of daughter Mary at age 4 (Cincinnati Art Museum). c. 1874

== Death and legacy ==
Eaton was elected into the National Academy of Design as an associate academician in 1866. He died in Yonkers, New York in 1875.
