= Joseph Oriel Eaton II =

American businessman (1873–1949)

Joseph O. Eaton II
- Born: Harrison Eaton; July 28, 1873; Yonkers, New York, U.S.
- Died: May 15, 1949 (aged 75); Cleveland Heights, Ohio, U.S.
- Education: Williams College
- Occupations: Businessman; financier
- Spouse: Edith
- Father: Joseph Oriel Eaton
- Awards: Automotive Hall of Fame (1983)

Joseph Oriel Eaton II (July 28, 1873 – May 15, 1949) was born in Yonkers, New York. At birth, he was named Harrison Eaton but his mother changed his name as a tribute, after Harrison's father, the painter Joseph Oriel Eaton I, died.

Joseph was raised in Cincinnati and attended Williams College in Massachusetts. He was one of the founders of Torbensen Gear and Axle Company which is known today as Eaton Corporation.

He was inducted into the Automotive Hall of Fame in 1983.
