= Amasa Eaton =

American lawyer and politician

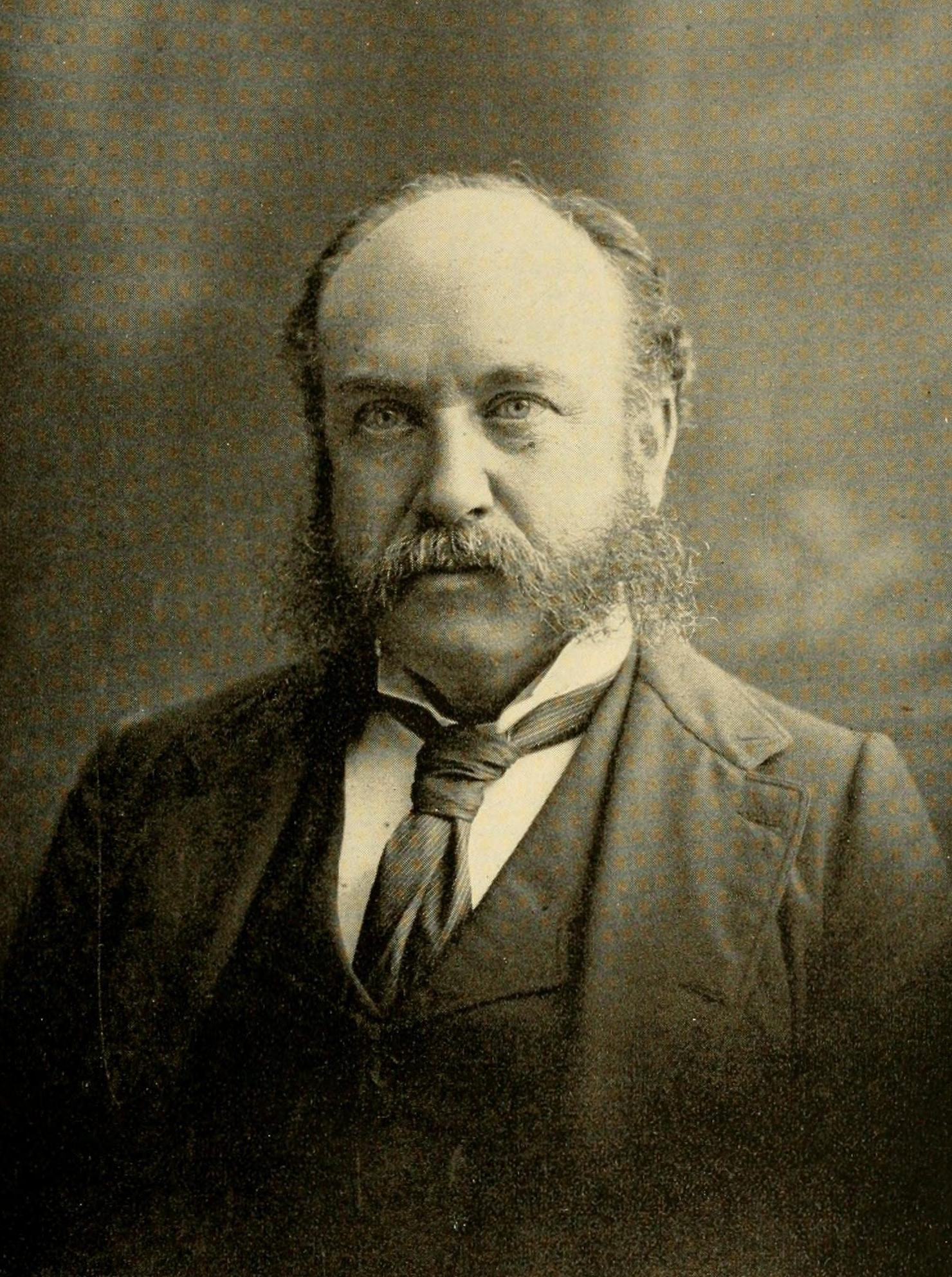
- Eaton circa 1900
- Born: May 31, 1841; Providence
- Died: October 3, 1914 (aged 73); Providence
- Position held: member of the Rhode Island House of Representatives (1865–1866)

Amasa Mason Eaton (May 31, 1841 – October 3, 1914) was an American lawyer and politician. Born in Providence, Rhode Island, Eaton briefly served in the Union Army after graduating from Brown University. In the 1860s and 1870s, he held various political positions in Rhode Island, including a seat in the Rhode Island House of Representatives. After receiving a law degree from Harvard University, he published on topics including municipal government and free trade.

== Life and education ==
Eaton was born on May 31, 1841, in Providence, Rhode Island, to Sarah (Brown) Eaton and Levi Eaton. He received an AM from Brown University in 1861 and an LLB from Harvard Law School in 1878. Shortly after graduating from Brown University, he joined the 1st Rhode Island Infantry Regiment, when the American Civil War started, serving for three months. He married Maude Dunnell on September 15, 1873, with whom he had six children. Eaton died on October 3, 1914, in Providence.

== Political career ==
Eaton's political career began in 1863, two years after his graduation from Brown University, when he was elected a member of the North Providence Town Council. He then became a member of the Rhode Island House of Representatives (1865–1866); a member of the Providence Common Council (1872–1874); and an alderman in Providence (1874–1875). Eaton was a member of the Democratic Party.

== Scholarship ==
Eaton was active in law reform efforts. He was a member of the Uniform Law Commission from 1897, becoming president from 1901 to 1910.

Eaton's article "On Contracts in Restraint of Trade", published in the Harvard Law Review, was the first to be cited in a decision of the Supreme Court of the United States. Justice Edward Douglass White cited it in dissent in United States v. Trans-Missouri Freight Association, 166 US 290 (1897).

Eaton supported self-government for municipalities. In Constitution-Making in Rhode Island (1899), he argued that the constitution of Rhode Island should be amended to prohibit state-level interference with local affairs. In "The Right to Local Self-Government", an article in five parts, he argued that municipalities held a right to govern themselves that predated the creation of states.

In 1913, Eaton published Free Trade vs. Protection, a book about efforts past and present to impose tariffs. It argued for free trade as against protectionism.

== Sources ==
- Munro, Wilfred Harold (1916). Memorial Encyclopedia of the State of Rhode Island. Boston: American Historical Society. OCLC 1048812579.
