= Elon Howard Eaton =

American scientist (1866–1934)

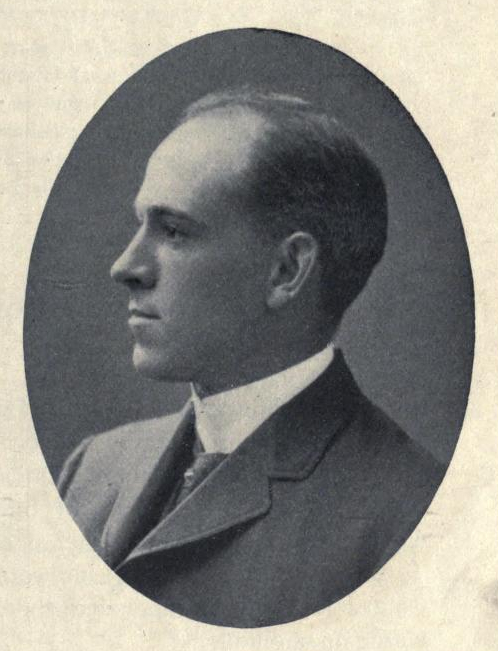

Elon Howard Eaton (sometimes Elon Eton; 8 October 1866 – 27 March 1934) was an American ornithologist, scholar, and author. He taught at the Hobart and William Smith Colleges from 1908 to 1935.

== Life and work ==
Eaton was born in the Town of Collins near Springville, New York, the son of Luzerne Eaton and Sophie Newton. Eaton was home-schooled and self-taught in rural southern Erie County, although he also attended the Griffith Institute in nearby Springville. As a youth, he took a taxidermy course in Buffalo, New York, where he prepared wildlife he had taken in the field with his shotgun. He attended the University of Rochester where he graduated in 1890 with a B.A. Subsequently, Eaton received an M.A (1893), M.Sc. (1910) and Sc.D. (1927), all from Rochester. While studying he also taught at the Canadaigua Union School. He then taught at the William Smith College where he established a biology department. From 1907 to 1916 he was on the Geneva Board of Health. After teaching science in local schools, he attended Columbia University (1899–1900) for additional graduate work, studying paleontology under Henry Fairfield Osborn.

Eaton established the biology department in Hobart and William Smith Colleges in 1908, where he taught biology, ornithology and hygiene, until his death. He was the New York State ornithologist and curator of the State Museum from 1908 to 1911. Each May he led a group of students and fellow ornithologists on a bird survey of Potter Swamp.

In 1901 he published Birds of Western New York. Part of the delay between volume one and volume two of Birds of New York was due to his marriage in 1909 to Gertrude Yeames and a heart attack in 1913. The publication of this work elicited many letters to Eaton, including one from the then-young Roger Tory Peterson. In 1915, Eaton later married second time, to Ester Woodman. His two marriages produced four children.

Elon Eaton also enjoyed a sporting life. Game taken in the field Eaton prepared himself for dinner parties.

Eaton died in Geneva, New York of atherosclerosis.

== Publications ==
- Birds of Western New York, 1901
- Birds of New York, (v. I: Water Birds, 1910, v. II: Land Birds, 1914), New York State Museum Memoir 12
- Biological Survey of the Finger Lakes

== Other sources ==
- Rising, Gerry, "A tribute to a gifted ornithologist from Springville," Buffalo News (21 September 2008)
- "Eaton was a vintner, a chef and an excellent shot," Buffalo News (5 October 1908)
