= Walla Walla Valley AVA =

American Viticultural Area (AVA) within Washington state

Coordinates: 46°10′22″N 118°12′10″W

Walla Walla Valley
- Wine region
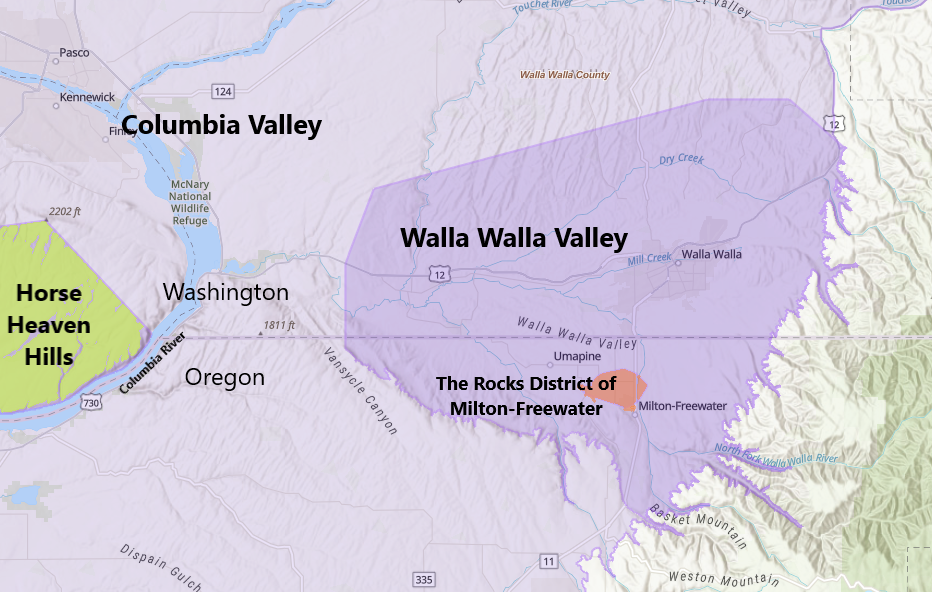
- Type: American Viticultural Area
- Year established: 1984; 2001 Amended
- Years of wine industry: 186
- Country: United States
- Part of: Washington, Oregon, Columbia Valley AVA
- Sub-regions: The Rocks District of Milton-Freewater AVA
- Growing season: 190 to 220 days
- Climate region: Region III
- Heat units: 3,024 GDD units
- Precipitation (annual average): 10 to 20 in (254–508 mm); Avg: 16.7 in (424.2 mm)
- Soil conditions: Loess soil, unstratified calcareous silt
- Total area: 178,560 acres (279 sq mi); 2001: 182,060 acres (284 sq mi)
- Size of planted vineyards: 2,933 acres (1,187 ha)
- No. of vineyards: 25
- Grapes produced: Barbera, Cabernet Franc, Cabernet Sauvignon, Carmenere, Chardonnay, Cinsault, Counoise, Dolcetto, Gewurztraminer, Malbec, Merlot, Nebbiolo, Petit Verdot, Pinot noir, Sangiovese, Semillon, Syrah, Viognier
- No. of wineries: 92
- Wine produced: Varietal, Dessert wine, Sparkling wine, Meritage
- Comments: The AVA (located within the black outline in the blue box) extends south into Northern Oregon

Walla Walla Valley is an American Viticultural Area (AVA) located within the Walla Walla Valley landform in southeast Washington and extending into the northeastern corner of Oregon. It was established as the nation's 59^{th} and both states' second appellation on February 6, 1984 by the Bureau of Alcohol, Tobacco and Firearms (ATF), Treasury after reviewing the petition submitted by Richard L Small, President of the Walla Walla Valley Winegrowers Association, proposing a viticultural area east of Lake Wallula straddling the state border in southeast Washington and northeast Oregon to be known as "Walla Walla Valley."

The wine region is entirely within the expansive Columbia Valley AVA. In addition to grapes, the area produces sweet onions, wheat and strawberries After the Yakima Valley AVA, the Walla Walla AVA has the second highest concentration of vineyards and wineries in Washington State hosting about 140 wineries, tasting rooms, wine bars & tasting rooms and several large annual wine-tasting festivals. As of 2025, the Walla Walla Valley encompasses approximately 182,060 acres (284 sq mi) cultivating 2,933 acres (1,187 ha) on 25 vineyards and 92 bonded wineries.

On February 2015, The Rocks District of Milton-Freewater or The Rocks of Milton-Freewater (known locally as "The Rocks District") was established in Umatilla County, Oregon as the nation's 228^{th}, Oregon's eighteenth, Columbia Valley's eleventh and Walla Walla Valley's initial appellation

== Name Evidence ==
The area is named after the Walla Walla River which flows through the valley into Walla Walla County, Washington. The Walla Walla Valley has been known as such since it was settled in the 1850s prior to the creation of the states of Oregon and Washington.

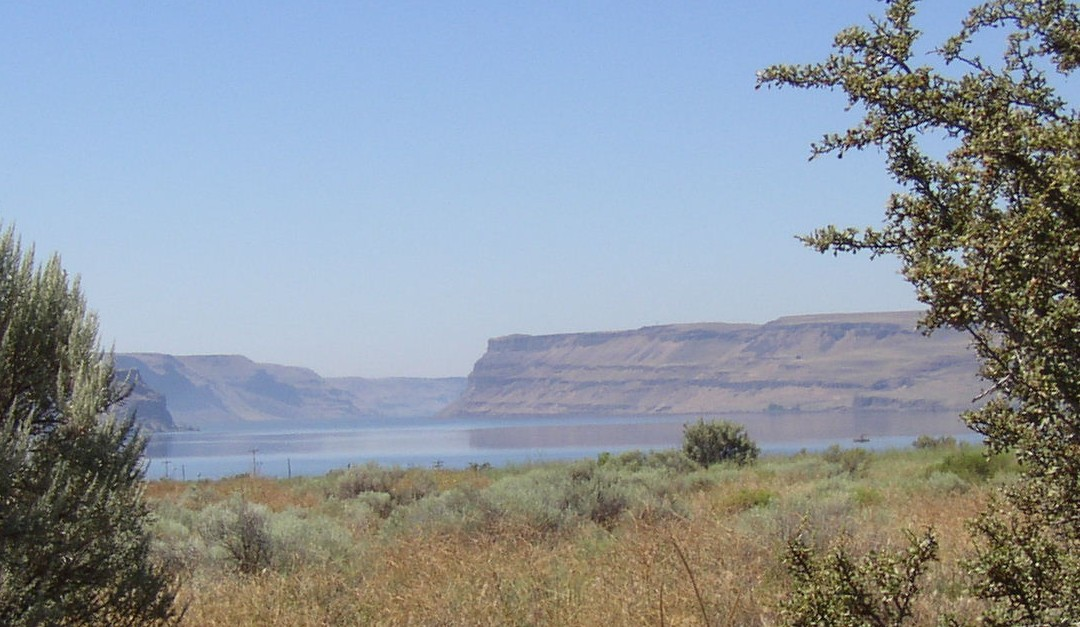
The Wallula Gap is just west of the Walla Walla Valley AVA near the confluence of the Walla Walla River and Columbia.

== History ==
Walla Walla Valley was an early leader in the beginnings of the Washington wine industry when the town of Walla Walla was founded by the Hudson's Bay Company as a trading post in the 1840s. French fur trappers settled in a small town outside the city known as Frenchtown near Lowden and began planting grapes. In the late 1850s, a settler named A.B. Roberts established the first nursery in Walla Walla, importing grape vines from Champoeg, Oregon. In 1859, the city of Walla Walla was incorporated and the Idaho gold rush of 1860 helped make the area a bustling trade center. When the gold rush ended, the economic focus of the state switched to Western Washington and the city of Seattle, lessening the influence of Walla Walla. In 1883, Northern Pacific Railway bypassed the Walla Walla Valley for a route from Spokane to Seattle. This essentially cut off Walla Walla from the growing market of the west. That same year a severe frost devastated the area's grapevines and caused a lot of the earlier grape growers to abandon their crops. The dawning of Prohibition in the United States in the early 20th century finished off the remaining aspect of the area as a wine region.

The founding of the L'Ecole No. 41 winery in 1983 contributed to the growth of viticulture in the Walla Walla Valley.

The rebirth of the Walla Walla wine industry occurred in the 1970s when Leonetti Cellars was founded on one-acre (0.40 ha) of Cabernet Sauvignon and Riesling. The winery gradually expanded and achieved worldwide recognition as it became one of Washington's most sought-after cult wines. The founding of Woodward Canyon Winery in 1981 and L'Ecole No. 41 in 1983 added to the region's visibility in the viticulture industry and as an appellation in 1984.

== Terroir ==
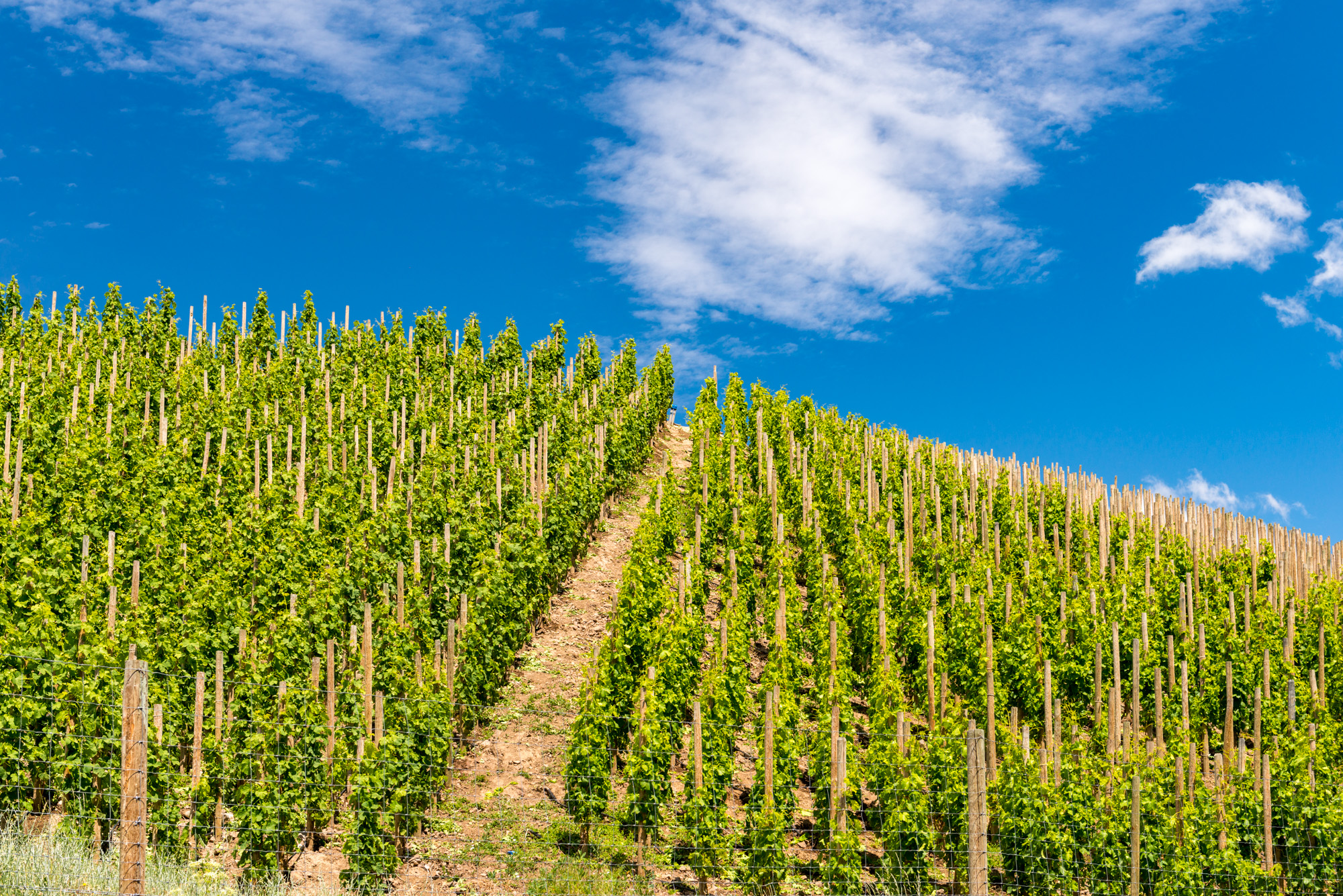
Vineyard along the North Fork Walla Walla River, Umatilla County, Oregon

=== Geography, climate and soils ===
Walla Walla Valley descends from about 1,500 feet (457 m) at the foot of the mountain slopes to about 500 feet (152 m) where the river cuts through the bedrock ridge near Divide, Oregon, astride the Oregon/Washington border. The U.S.D.A. in the Soil Survey of Umatilla County, Oregon, describes the Walla Walla Valley as extending from the northeast part of Umatilla County into the State of Washington. The Walla Walla Valley receives 10 to 20 inches (254–508 mm) of precipitation per year, averaging 12.5 inches (318 mm), and thus relies on irrigation. The Columbia Basin to the west and north receives less than 10 inches (254 mm) per year, and the Blue Mountains to the east and southeast receive 25 to 45 inches (635–1,143 mm).

The growing season within the area is between 190 and 220 days, longest within the surrounding six counties, is characterized by hot days and cool nights. The valley is prone to sudden shifts in temperature as cold air comes down from the Blue Mountains and is trapped in the Snake and Columbia River valleys. The average maximum and minimum temperatures within the area are 65 and 42 °F (18 and 6 °C), while the surrounding areas range from a high of 66 °F (19 °C) to a low of 34 °F (1 °C). While generally cooler than the surrounding Columbia Valley, temperatures in the winter time can drop to −20 °F (−29 °C).

The soils of the Walla Walla Valley consist largely of wind-deposited loess, which provides good drainage for vines. Most are classed as I or II irrigated capability units by the Soil Conservation Service. This is in contrast to the soils west of the Touchet River and along the Snake and Columbia Rivers which are droughty and are classified as Classes IV and VI. Soils to the west around Wallula Gap on the Columbia River, and to the east in the Blue Mountains are considered not suitable for cultivation.

The southern part of Walla Walla Valley extends into the state of Oregon and is one of the warmer wine growing regions in that state, after the Rogue Valley. Syrah is a major planting in this area. The USDA plant hardiness zone ranges from 6b to 7b..

== Grapes ==
Cabernet Sauvignon is the most well known and widely planted grape in the area, followed by Merlot, Syrah, Sangiovese, and Cabernet Franc.

As of 2007:

- Cabernet Sauvignon - 41% of planted area
- Merlot - 26% of planted area
- Syrah - 16% of planted area
- Cabernet Franc - 4% of planted area
- Sangiovese - 2% of planted area
- Chardonnay - 2% of planted area
- Viognier - 1% of planted area
- Other red varietals (Barbera, Carmenere, Cinsaut, Counoise, Dolcetto, Grenache, Malbec, Mourvedre, Nebbiolo, Petit Verdot, Pinot noir, Tempranillo) - 7% of planted area
- Other white varietals (Gewurztraminer, Pinot gris, Riesling, Roussane, Sauvignon blanc, Semillon) - 1% of planted area
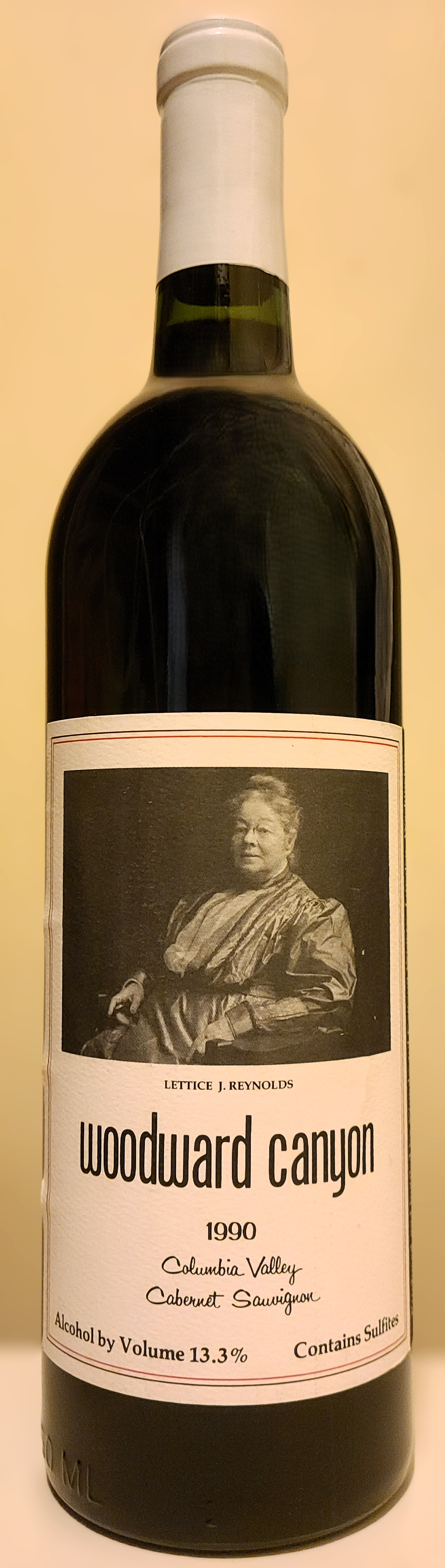
1990 Woodward Canyon Cab

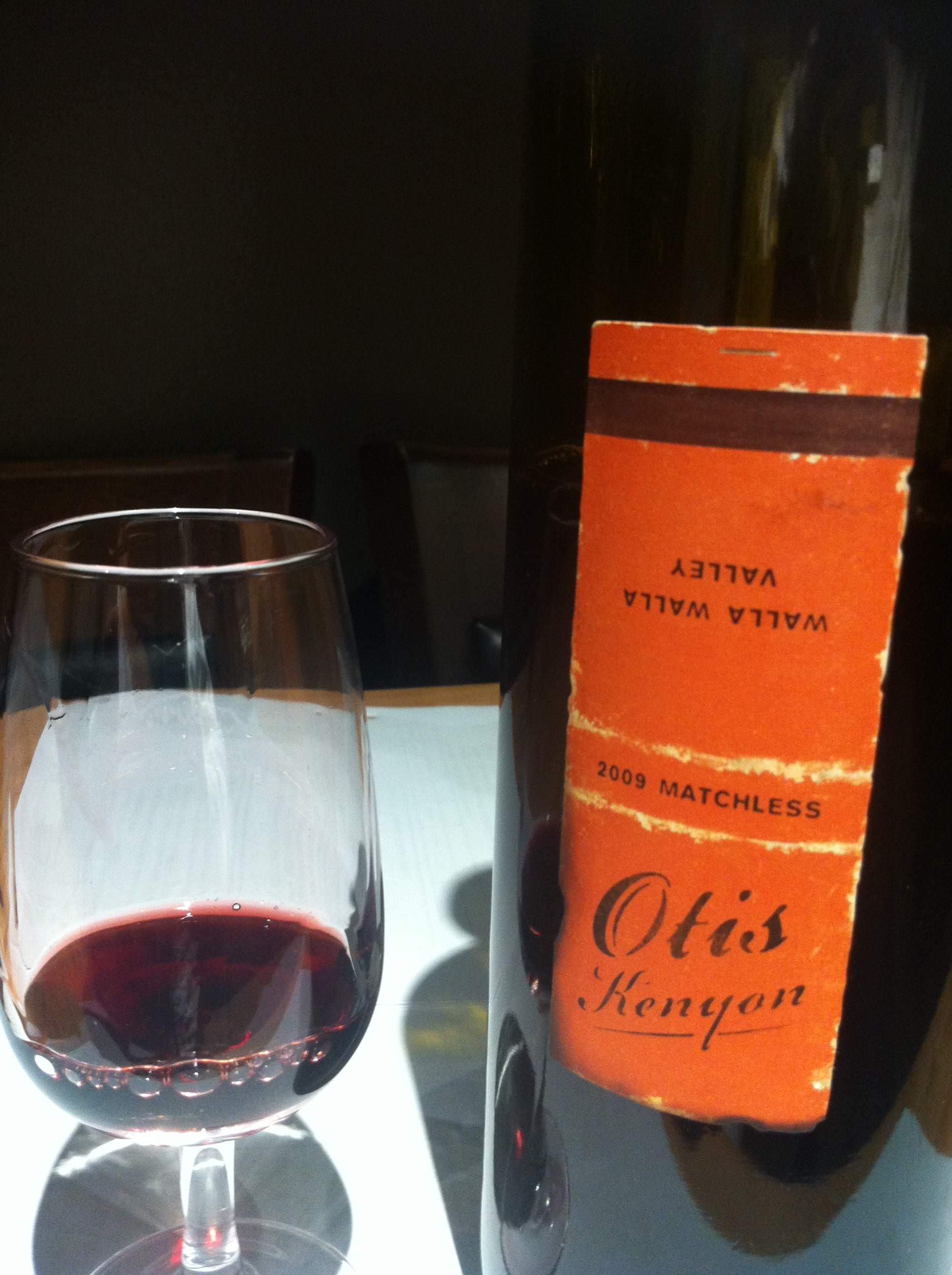
Walla Walla Valley Red blend
