= L'Ecole No. 41 =

Winery in Lowden, Washington

- The No. 41 schoolhouse, now L'Ecole Winery
- Location: Lowden, Washington, U.S.
- Coordinates: 46.0568°N 118.5811°W
- Appellation: Walla Walla Valley AVA; Columbia Valley AVA
- Founded: 1983
- Varietals: Cabernet Sauvignon, Chardonnay, Chenin blanc, Merlot, Sémillon, Syrah

L'Ecole No. 41 is a winery in Lowden, Washington, United States, in the Walla Walla River valley. The winery building was constructed as a schoolhouse in 1915. After the school was closed in 1974, banker and economist Baker Ferguson and his wife Jean purchased the building and opened it as a winery in 1983, making it the third commercial winery in the Walla Walla Valley. L'Ecole produces wines from both the Columbia Valley and Walla Walla Valley American Viticultural Areas, including Cabernet Sauvignon, Merlot, sémillon, and Syrah.

== History ==
Wine grapes have been grown in the valley of the Walla Walla River of Washington state since the 1850s, following early Euro-American settlement in the region. Although commercial prospects were explored during the 1870s, a regional wine industry would not emerge until 1977, with the foundation of the Leonetti Cellar winery. By 1984, the area had four wineries, and the appellation was designated as the Walla Walla Valley AVA, the second American Viticultural Area in Washington.

The unincorporated community of Frenchtown was founded west of the modern city of Walla Walla by French-Canadian American settlers in the mid-1800s. In 1915, the area was renamed Lowden, and the Walla Walla School District schoolhouse No. 41 was built to replace an earlier school constructed in 1900. Farms in the valley consolidated over the 20th century, leading to lower populations. In 1974, the population decrease forced the school to close; students in Lowden were split between the nearby Touchet and Walla Walla school districts.

Intending to open a winery, Baker Ferguson (a Whitman College economics professor and president of Walla Walla's Baker Boyer Bank) and his wife Jean Ferguson purchased the vacant No. 41 schoolhouse in 1977. After remodeling and renovations, the building was opened as the L'Ecole No. 41 winery (French: l'ecole, 'school') in 1983. After Leonetti Cellar in 1977 and Woodward Canyon in 1981, L'Ecole was the third winery in the Walla Walla Valley and the 20th in Washington. The Fergusons retired in 1989, and were succeeded as owners and managers by their daughter Megan Clubb and her husband Marty Clubb. By 2014, the winery was managed by their children, Rebecca and Riley Clubb.

== Operations ==
Various L'Ecole wines

L'Ecole uses grapes from both the Columbia Valley and Walla Walla Valley AVAs. In 2010, Marty Clubb described the production as two-thirds Columbia Valley wines and one-third Walla Walla Valley wines. The winery produces Cabernet Sauvignon, Chardonnay, Chenin blanc, Merlot, Sémillon, and Syrah from Columbia Valley grapes, sourced from the Pepper Bridge, Va Piano, Loess, and Yellow Jacket vineyards. L'Ecole's local wines are grown at the Seven Hills (which it co-owns with Leonetti and Pepper Bridge) and Ferguson Ridge vineyards in Milton-Freewater, Oregon. These local varieties include Cabernet Sauvignon, Merlot, Sémillon, and Syrah.

The national wine distribution company Winebow has served as L'Ecole's distributor since 2025. As of 2023, the American wine magazine Wine & Spirits has included L'Ecole in its list of the world's top 100 wineries 16 times, higher than all but 18 other wineries.
