= Mill Creek (Walla Walla River tributary) =

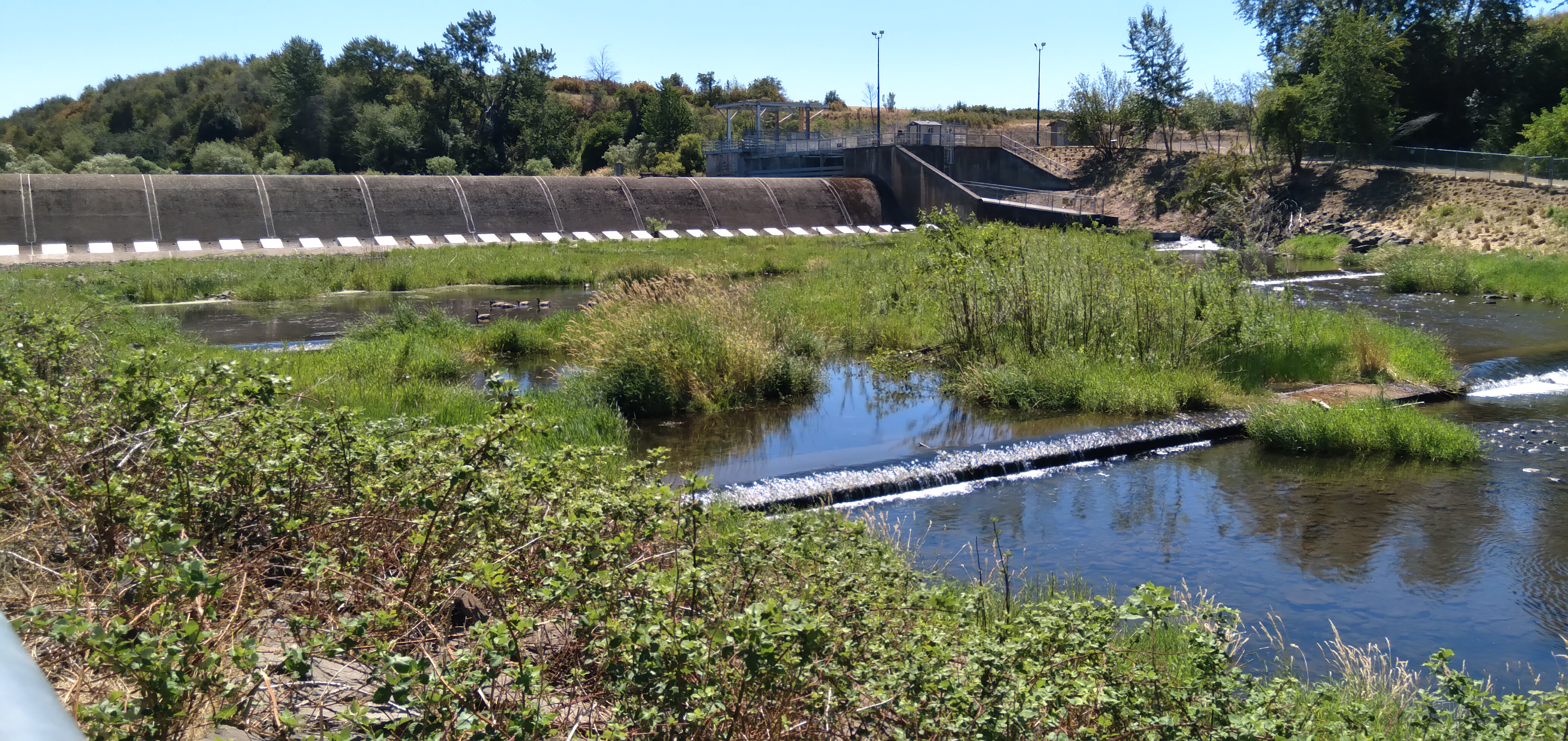
- The flood diversion dam on Mill Creek upstream of Walla Walla

- Location of the mouth of Mill Creek in Washington

Physical characteristics
- Source: Blue Mountains
  - location: Columbia County, Washington
  - coordinates: 45°59′58″N 117°55′42″W
  - elevation: 4,800 ft (1,500 m)
- Mouth: Walla Walla River
  - location: Walla Walla County, Washington
  - coordinates: 46°02′19″N 118°28′43″W
  - elevation: 594 ft (181 m)
- Length: 36.5 mi (58.7 km)
- Basin size: 113.7 mi^{2} (294 km^{2})
- Discharge
  - location: About 1.5 mi (2.4 km) upstream from Walla Walla
  - average: 79.9 cu ft/s (2.26 m^{3}/s)
  - minimum: 0 cu ft/s (0 m^{3}/s)
  - maximum: 3,070 cu ft/s (87 m^{3}/s)

Mill Creek is a 36.5-mile-long (58.7 km) tributary of the Walla Walla River, flowing through southeast Washington and northeast Oregon in the United States. It drains from the western side of the Blue Mountains into the Walla Walla Valley and flows through the city of Walla Walla, which draws most of its water supply from the creek. The creek is named for the sawmill built in 1845 by Marcus Whitman, one of the first European settlers in the valley.

== Geography ==
Mill Creek originates in the Umatilla National Forest, on the border of Columbia County, Washington and Wallowa County, Oregon. It flows north through Columbia County and turns west, entering Walla Walla County, Washington, turning southwest and crossing into Umatilla County, Oregon before crossing back north into Walla Walla County. Emerging from the foothills of the Blue Mountains, it enters the Walla Walla Valley, and flows west through downtown Walla Walla, where it runs through a concrete flood-control channel. West of the city, it reverts to a natural streambed, and it joins the Walla Walla River near the Whitman Mission National Historic Site, about 33 miles (53 km) upstream of the Walla Walla River's confluence with the Columbia River.

Tributaries of the creek from upstream to downstream are Green Fork, Deadman Creek, and North Fork Mill Creek from the right; Paradise, Broken, Low Ridge, Tiger, and Henry Canyon Creeks from the left, and Blue Creek from the right. The creek breaks into several distributaries as it enters the Walla Walla Valley, with Yellowhawk Creek and Garrison Creek diverging off to the southwest and joining the Walla Walla River south of College Place. Russell and Cottonwood Creeks flow from the western foothills of the Blues to join Yellowhawk Creek above its confluence with the Walla Walla.

== History ==
The area was once inhabited by the Walla Walla and Cayuse people. While there was no specific name for what is now Mill Creek, the greater system of meandering streams and floodplain in the valley was called Walawála, "many waters". The first white settlers in the area were Presbyterian missionaries led by Marcus and Narcissa Whitman, who established Whitman Mission in 1836 at the confluence of Mill Creek and the Walla Walla River. Marcus Whitman built a sawmill on upper Mill Creek in 1845. The stream has been known as Mill Creek at least since this time. In 1847 a group of Cayuse massacred the Whitmans and eleven others, following a deadly measles outbreak which they blamed on the settlers. This was a major factor leading to the Cayuse War, which precipitated the expulsion of tribes from the valley in the 1855 Treaty of Walla Walla. Washington Territorial Governor Isaac Stevens and his party were ambushed by Cayuse on upper Mill Creek on September 19, 1856, following the failure of peace talks. Fighting continued until about 1859, when the remaining tribal members were forced to move to reservations. The city of Walla Walla was incorporated in 1862.

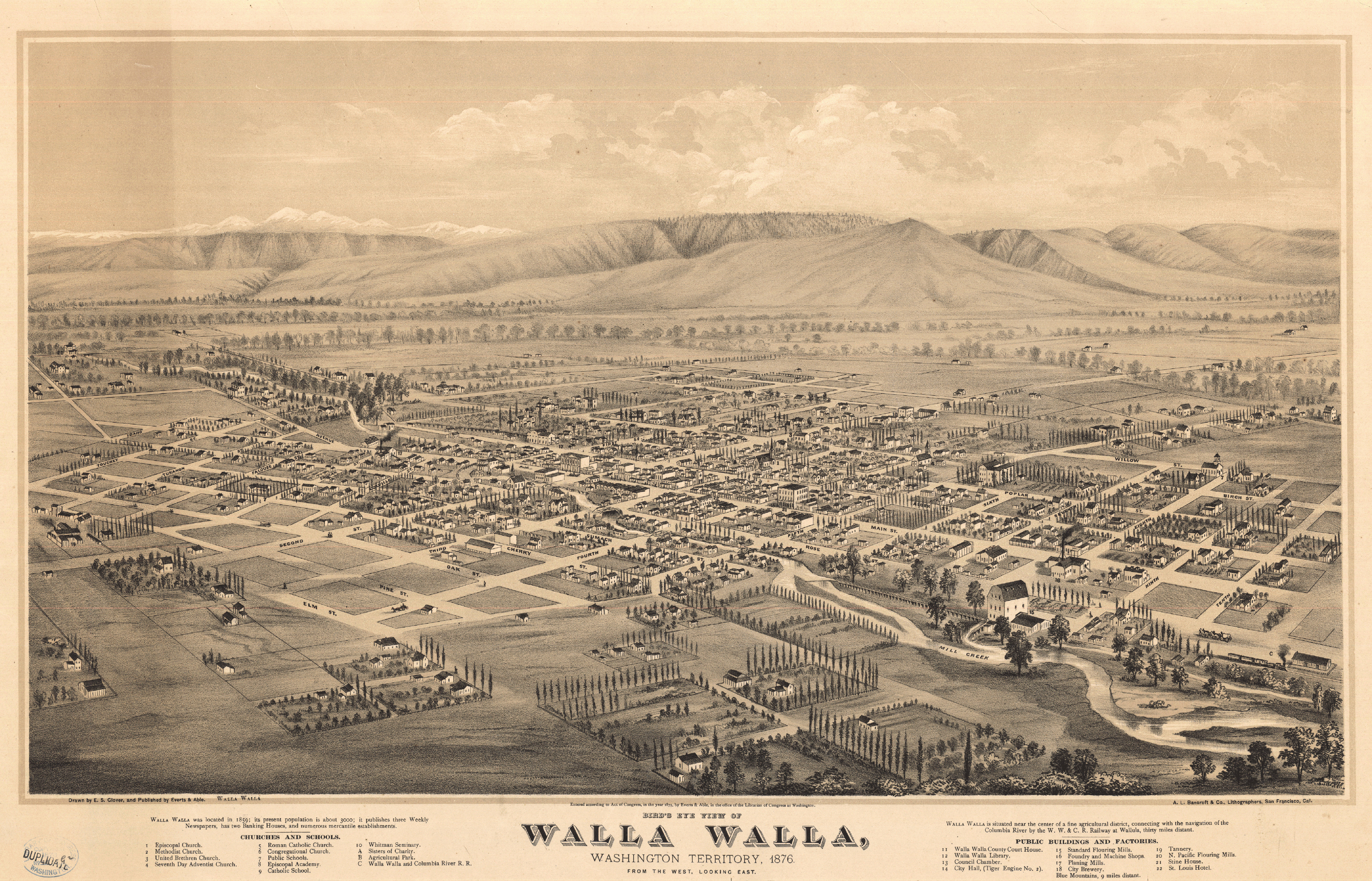
A drawing of Walla Walla in 1876, shows the path of Mill Creek through the center of town.

In 1880 the Mill Creek Flume and Manufacturing Company was organized by Dorsey S. Baker (the founder of Baker Boyer Bank in Walla Walla) to log the upper Mill Creek watershed. They purchased about 4,000 acres (1,600 ha) of timber and constructed a 12-mile-long (19 km) log flume carrying saw logs to a mill near Tracy. Cut timber was shipped to town on a 8-mile (13 km) narrow-gauge railroad along Mill Creek, which also became popular for tourist excursions. Much of this infrastructure was constructed by Chinese laborers, who camped in the area of upper Mill Creek now known as China Canyon. Only two years later, the flumes were destroyed by flooding, and logging operations ceased. The Mill Creek railroad was later extended north to Dixie where it was used to transport clay, wheat and passengers; it passed through multiple owners to eventually be acquired by the Northern Pacific and was shut down in 1970.

Almina Garland and Jake Klicker homesteaded along upper Mill Creek in 1891, and built the Klicker Springs Hotel and Spa on Mill Creek near the confluence with Henry Canyon. The hotel's bath houses were fed by natural mineral springs, which were also used to make carbonated drinks. Originally reachable only by carriage, the resort was made accessible to automobiles in 1911 after bridges were built over Mill Creek. The hotel closed in the 1920s, though the Klicker residence still stands. The Walla Walla Kiwanis Club established Camp Kiwanis nearby in 1923. A number of private cabins were also built in the area during the 1920s and 1930s in the community of Kooskooskie.

== Management ==
The headwaters of the creek in the Umatilla National Forest are managed as the Mill Creek Municipal Watershed, which provides about 90 percent of the domestic water supply for the city of Walla Walla. The 21,740-acre (8,800 ha) municipal watershed was established by an agreement between the city and the Secretary of Agriculture on June 26, 1918. This area is closed to public access, except by special permission from the U.S. Forest Service. As it flows out of the watershed, water from Mill Creek is diverted through a hydroelectric plant and a 14.5-mile (23.3 km) pipeline that connects to the city water treatment plant. Never heavily logged or grazed, this area is unique among Blue Mountain watersheds due to its relatively pristine condition; however, with past fire suppression practices, it is vulnerable to wildfires due to build-up of fuels. The Forest Service is developing the Tiger-Mill Project which will carry out prescribed burning and fuel reductions thinning across most of the watershed.

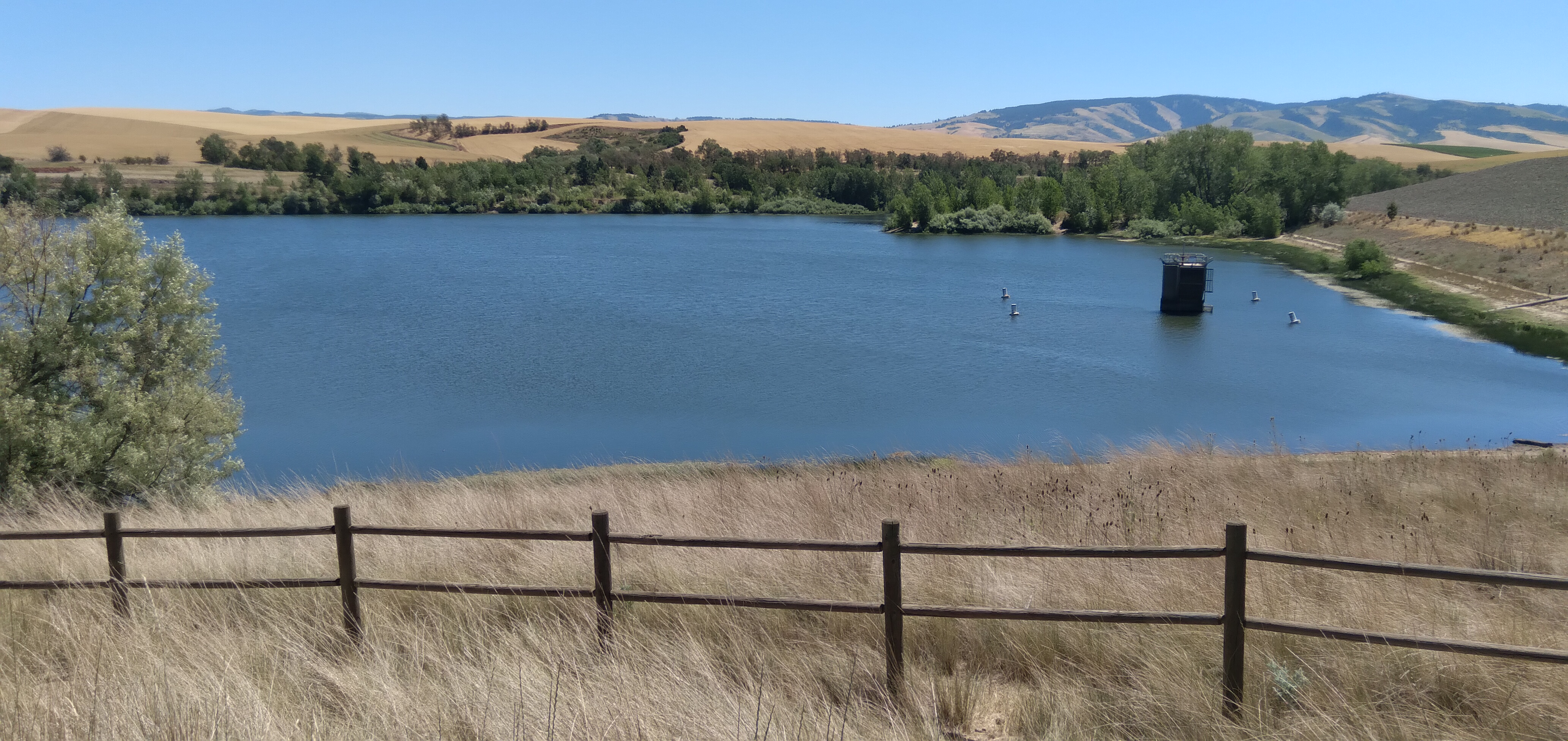
Bennington Lake

The city of Walla Walla holds the largest and most senior water right on Mill Creek, which accounts for some two-thirds of its average summer (dry season) flow. This created problems during dry years, when almost all the water could be diverted, dewatering the lower stretches of the creek. In the 1940s, the city began to develop groundwater wells as a supplemental water source. In the early 2000s, the city began working to address the issue of dewatering in summer. Several wells were upgraded to enable groundwater injection of excess winter runoff, to be stored in the aquifer for use in the dry months, when surface water diversions could be temporarily reduced or halted to preserve instream flows for fish.

The creek has historically posed a major flooding hazard, flooding the city of Walla Walla 15 times between 1878 and 1931. The Works Progress Administration excavated the concrete channel for Mill Creek through downtown Walla Walla in the 1930s. In 1938, Congress authorized the U.S. Army Corps of Engineers to construct the Mill Creek Flood Control Project, which channelized large sections of the creek upstream and downstream of the city and constructed Bennington Lake, an off-stream flood control reservoir, east of the city. A dam on Mill Creek diverts high winter flows to be temporarily stored in the reservoir. The flood control system is intended to limit peak flows through the city to 3,500 cubic feet per second (99 m^{3}/s). A second dam downstream allows some water from Mill Creek to flow into Garrison and Yellowhawk Creeks, which are used for irrigation in the Walla Walla Valley.

In February 1996 Mill Creek experienced historic flooding from a rain-on-snow atmospheric river event. Bennington Lake filled to 97 percent and streamflows through Walla Walla slightly exceeded the design capacity, but only minor flooding occurred in the city. In February 2020, Mill Creek set a new high water record, which caused significant damage in the Walla Walla Valley, though the city was not flooded.

== Ecology ==
The protected headwaters of Mill Creek provide high quality habitat for Columbia River steelhead trout which migrate up the creek to spawn. The flood control channel in downtown Walla Walla has been a barrier for fish since its construction, as the water flows too quickly through the concrete channel for fish to migrate upstream. The Mill Creek Work Group, led by Tri-State Steelheaders and the Washington Department of Fish and Wildlife, assessed the Mill Creek channel in 2009 and recommended several fish passage projects, including constructing resting pools in the concrete channel and notching weirs to provide areas of deeper, concentrated flow. The first phases were completed in 2011 and work is expected to continue through 2025.

== See also ==
- List of rivers of Washington (state)
- List of rivers of Oregon
