= Walla Walla River =

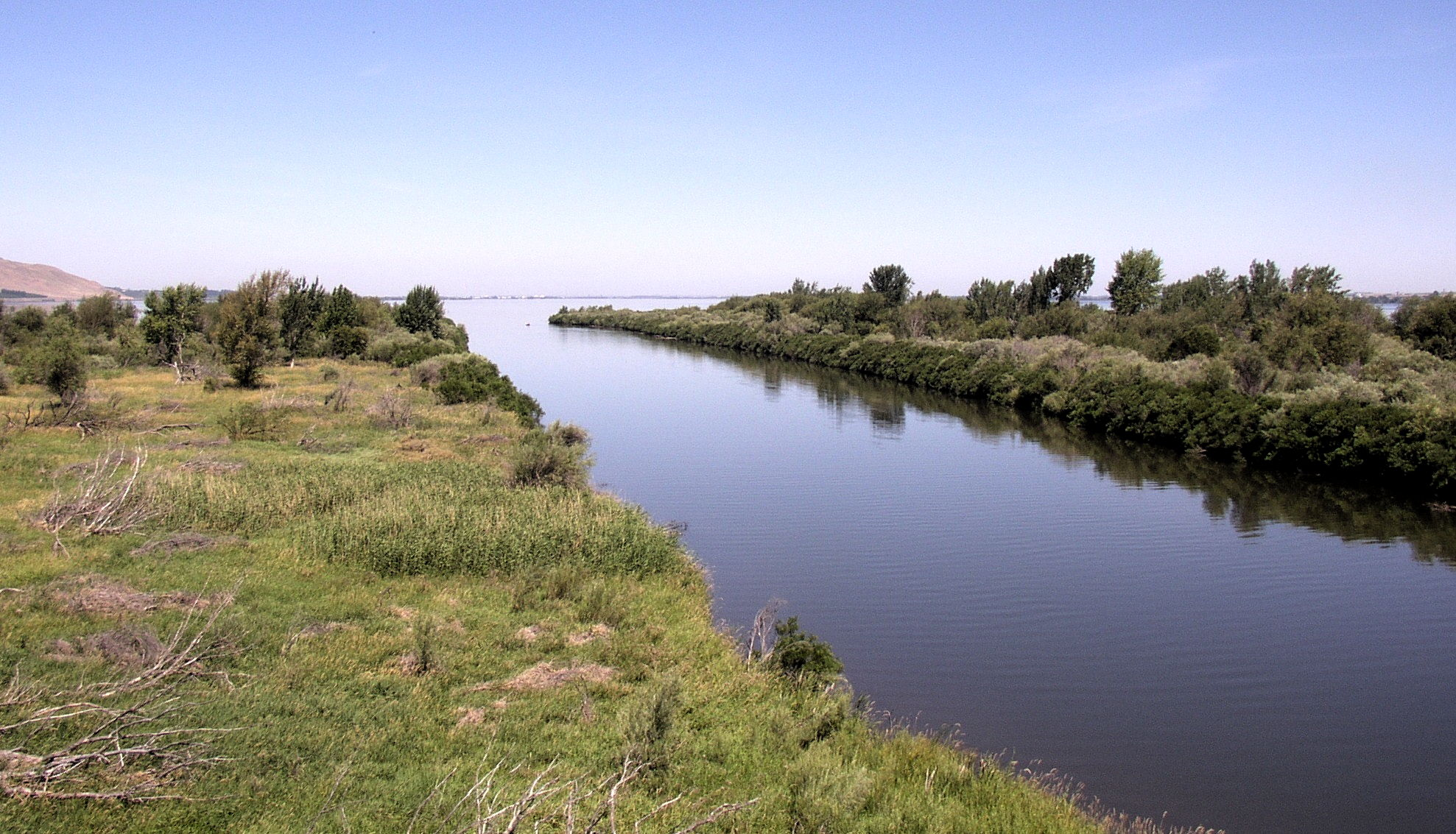
- Confluence of the Walla Walla with the Columbia

Location
- Country: United States
- State: Oregon, Washington
- County: Umatilla, Walla Walla

Physical characteristics
- Source: South Fork Walla Walla River
  - length: 27.7 mi (44.6 km)
- 2nd source: North Fork Walla Walla River
  - length: 18.9 mi (30.4 km)
- Source confluence: North and South Forks
  - location: near Milton-Freewater, Oregon
- Mouth: Lake Wallula on the Columbia River
  - coordinates: 46°3′58″N 118°55′3″W
- Length: 51.3 mi (82.6 km) (mainstem)
- Basin size: 1,758 sq mi (4,550 km^{2})

Basin features
- Tributaries
  - left: Couse Creek, Pine Creek
  - right: Mill Creek, Dry Creek, Touchet River
- Distributaries: Little Walla Walla River

The Walla Walla River is a tributary of the Columbia River which runs through portions of eastern Washington and Oregon in the United States. Originating in the Blue Mountains, its two forks merge south of the town of Milton-Freewater, before continuing north into a wide river valley and floodplains as it approaches the Washington border. It receives Mill Creek as a tributary near the city of Walla Walla, alongside various anabranches formed by distributary channels which split off from the Walla Walla and rejoin it later on. It flows west and receives the Touchet River later in its course, meeting the Columbia River at a delta on Lake Wallula.

The river receives groundwater discharge from an alluvium aquifer which formed during flooding at the end of the last ice age, as well as from a complex of basalt aquifers in the Columbia River Basalt Group that was formed by large volcanic eruptions during the Miocene. The terrain of the watershed includes upland conifer forests as well as large areas of scrubland; however, much of the riverside habitat and the surrounding scrubland has been cleared or modified for agriculture.

Named for the indigenous Walla Walla people, the river valley was settled by European-American colonists during the 19th century and began to host a large agricultural community. Mechanised agriculture and irrigation systems in the 20th century greatly expanded the area's productivity, increasing demand for water. The river was channelised, leveed, and dammed; this curtailed floods, disrupted salmon spawning, and caused the river to dry up during the summers for much of the 20th century.

== Course ==
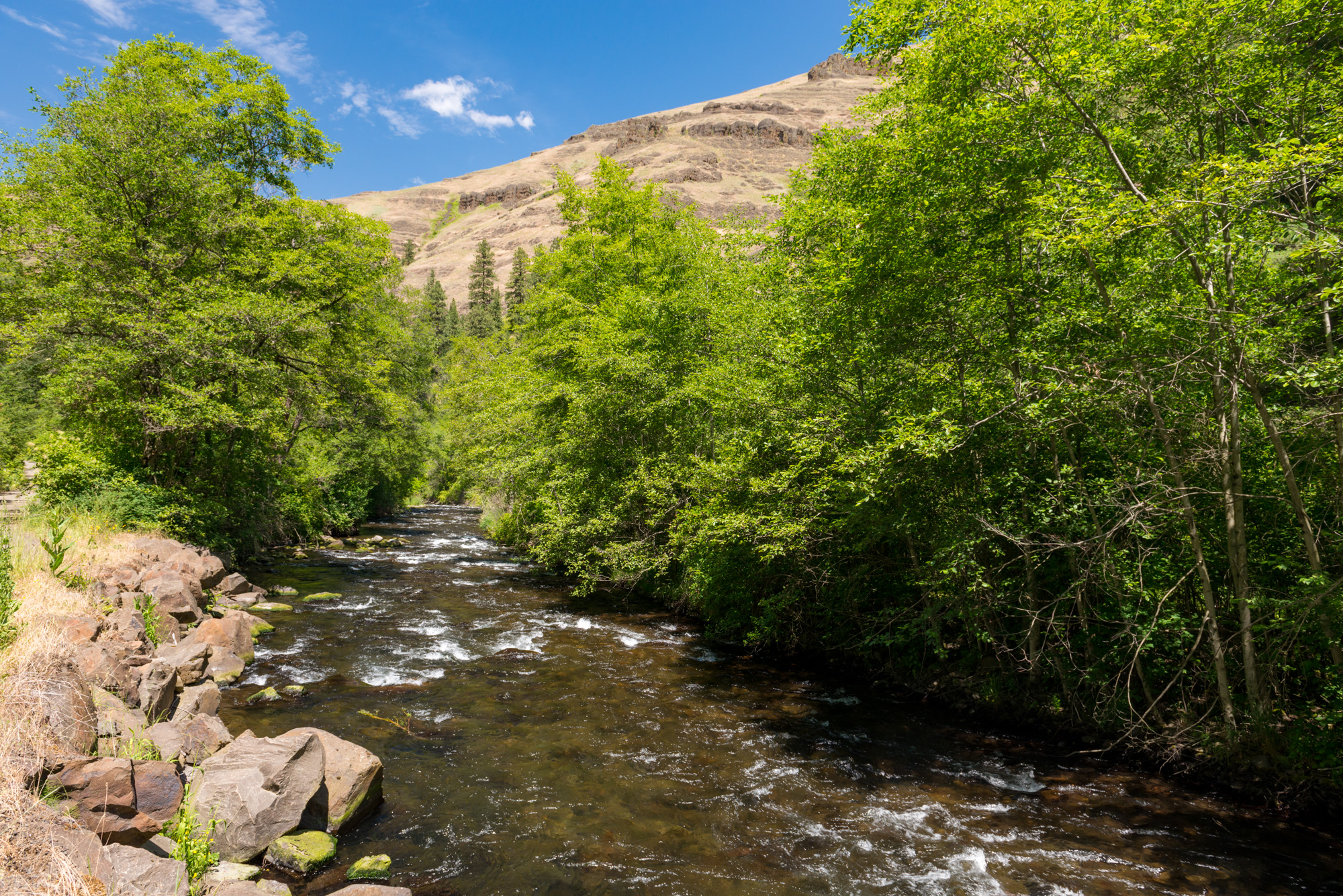
South Fork of the Walla Walla River at Harris County Park near Milton-Freewater, Oregon

The Walla Walla River originates from two streams, the North Fork Walla Walla River and the South Fork Walla Walla River, both with their headwaters in the Blue Mountains of Oregon. They flow west from the mountains and meet to form the mainstem Walla Walla River (a course also known as the Tumalum Branch). The river receives many smaller tributary streams, the largest of which within its upper course in Oregon are Couse Creek and Birch Creek. The river becomes channelized and leveed as it flows north into Milton-Freewater, opening up into a wide valley with rolling hills and floodplains.

Within the Walla Walla Valley is a wide network of anabranches formed by distributaries splitting off from the main channel and rejoining it later in its course. These include the Little Walla Walla River, which flows out of the Walla Walla near Milton-Freewater, Oregon, and flows northwards, splitting into two forks. Both forks rejoining the river through both surface flow and groundwater discharge. The distributaries are fed both by water from the Walla Walla River and from various small spring-fed creeks. Many of the small creeks and waterways in this area have names which differ between Washington, Oregon, and federal records.

The mainstem Walla Walla crosses into Washington state about six miles to its north, entering a broad channel constrained by terraces on either side As it turns west and passes near the city of Walla Walla, the river first takes in Yellowhawk Creek as a tributary, which is fed by water diverted from Mill Creek and from streams in the hills east of the city. It then takes in another Mill Creek distributary, Garrison Creek, before taking in Mill Creek itself several miles later. From around May to October, most of Mill Creek's flow is diverted by flood control structures into Garrison Creek and Yellowhawk Creek.

Near the unincorporated community of Lowden, Washington, the river receives Dry Creek as a tributary, which originates in the Blue Mountains. West of the town of Touchet, at an elevation of about 420 feet (130 m), the river receives another major tributary, the Touchet River. The Touchet emerges from four forks in the Blue Mountains, converging near Dayton, and drains an area of largely agricultural land.

== Watershed ==
The Walla Walla basin covers an area of about 1,758 square miles (4,550 km^{2}). About two-thirds of the watershed lie within Washington, with the other third in Oregon. The Washington portions of the watershed lie within Walla Walla County and Columbia County, while the Oregon portion mostly lies within Umatilla County, Oregon, with very small portions of the upper watershed crossing into Wallowa County and Union County. The highest point within the watershed is Table Rock, which reaches an elevation of 6,250 feet (1,900 m) above sea level, with the crest of the Blue Mountains averaging around 5,000 feet (1,500 m). Below the mountains, the terrain slopes from 2,500 feet (760 m) to 270 feet (82 m) at the river's confluence with the Columbia.

Much of the northern portion of the Walla Walla basin lies within the Palouse, a large region of rolling dryland hills which supports extensive agriculture. The river valley created by the Walla Walla and Mill Creek creates large plains which host farms and settlements. About 54% of the basin is agricultural land, 25% is scrubland and grassland, and 17% is forests. Much of the watershed is sparsely populated. There are five communities in the basin with a population of above 1,200 people. Walla Walla, Washington, is the largest city, at about 34,000 people as of 2019. Milton-Freewater is the largest settlement in the Oregon side of the basin, at about 7,000 people as of 2019.

=== Climate ===
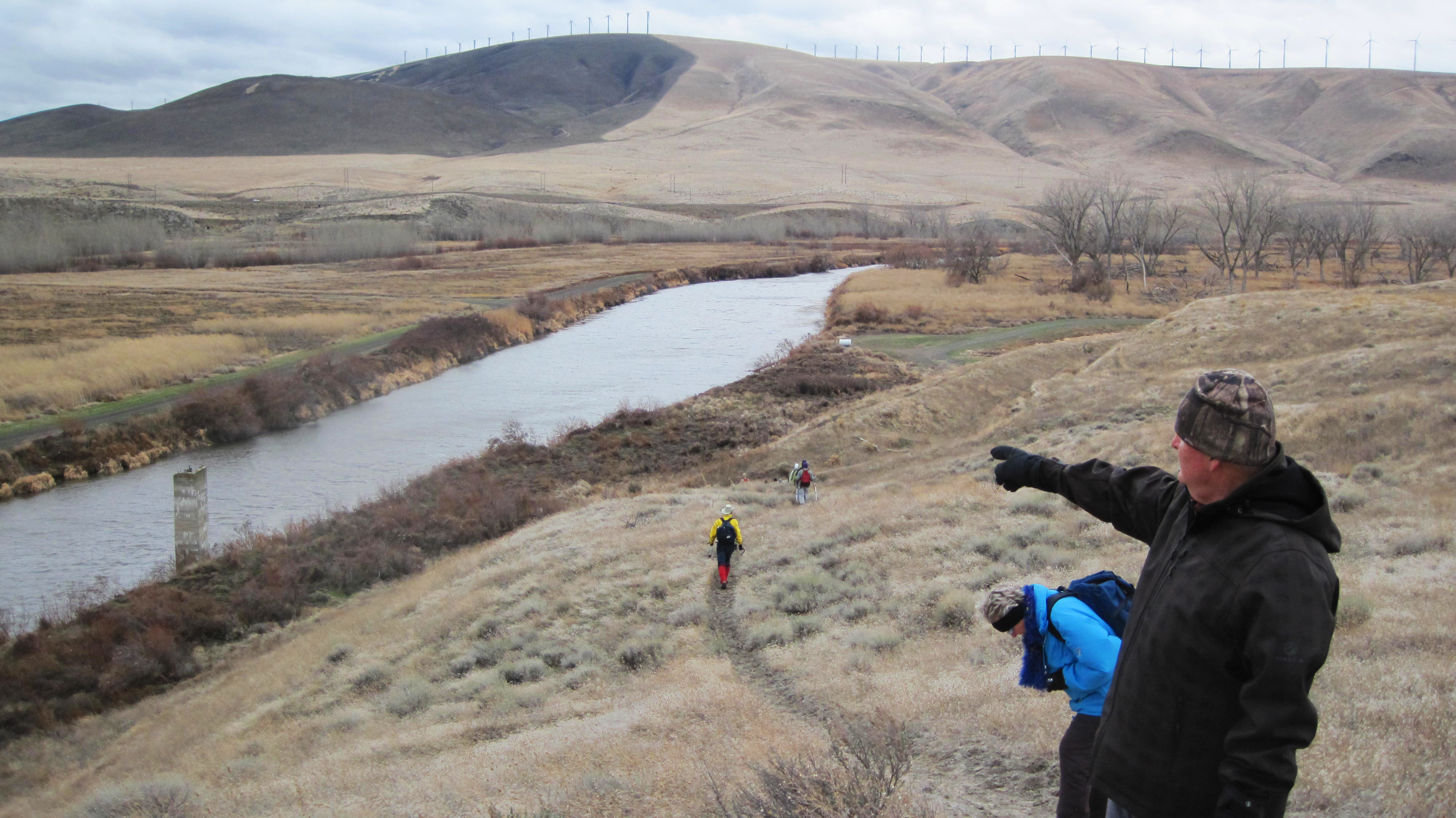
Hikers on a trail along the Walla Walla River in early winter

Precipitation in the Walla Walla basin varies greatly. Along the Columbia River, it can reach as low as 7 inches (180 mm) per year, while it can average 40–60 inches (1,000–1,500 mm) per year in the heights of the Blue Mountains. The average rainfall across the whole basin is below 10 inches (250 mm) per year. The Cascade Range to the west of the Columbia Plateau creates a wide rain shadow that reaches the Blue Mountains, creating a semi-arid climate in the lowlands across the basin. Temperatures regularly exceed 100 °F (38 °C) during the summer, and reach below 0 °F (−18 °C) in the winter.

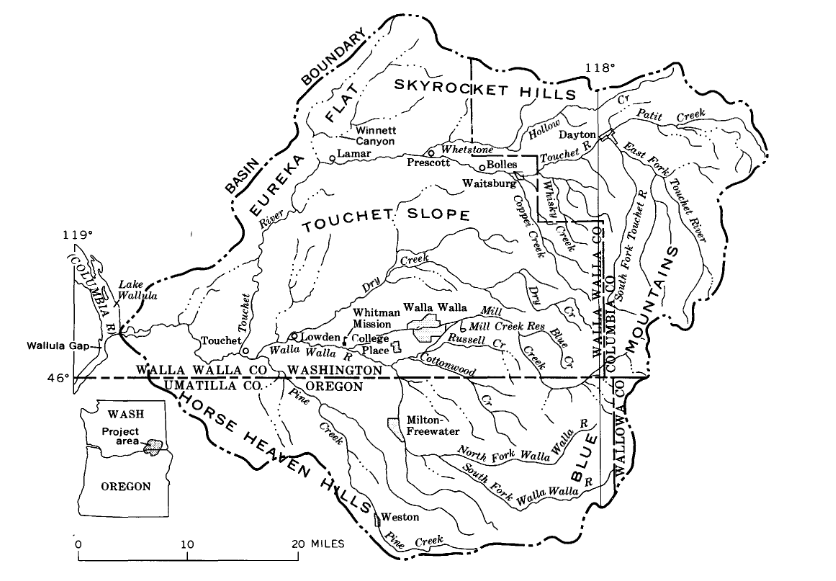
1969 map of the Walla Walla basin

Snow storms during the winter and the resulting snowmelt in the spring have historically been the greatest source of fresh water for the subbasin, with precipitation and streamflow dropping greatly during the summer. Diversion of water for agricultural uses has exacerbated the summer streamflow decline. Warmer temperatures due to climate change is predicted to lessen snowfall and push melting to earlier in the year, worsening existing streamflow and water temperature issues. Thunderstorms occur on average 11 days per year in the watershed, mainly in the summers. They often produce significantly increased streamflow, deposing sediment into the water.

=== Hydrology ===
The dominant source of water in the Walla Walla basin varies depending on the time of year. During the early winter, runoff from precipitation dominates. Snowmelt forms the main source of water during the spring and early summer, while groundwater discharge is the dominant source during the summer and the coldest period of the winter. The flow in the basin is the highest during the winter and spring, and declines significantly during the summer due to both decreased rainfall and increased demand for irrigation.

The mainstem of the Walla Walla River runs for 51.3 miles (82.6 km) from the confluence of its forks to the Columbia. The South Fork is 27.7 mi (44.6 km) long, while the North Fork is 18.9 mi (30.4 km). The total length of the river, from its mouth to the headwaters of the South Fork, is about 80 miles (130 km).

Major Walla Walla tributaries
Tributary	Drainage area	Annual discharge	Length	Confluence RM. (Note: Number of miles upstream from the Walla Walla's mouth that the rivers converge)
South Fork Walla Walla River	63 sq mi (160 km^{2})	139,000 acre-feet (0.171 km^{3}) (Note: 1997 data)	27.7 mi (44.6 km)	51.3 miles (82.6 km)
North Fork Walla Walla River	34 sq mi (88 km^{2})	39,200 acre-feet (0.048 km^{3})	18.9 mi (30.4 km)	51.3 miles (82.6 km)
Couse Creek	25 sq mi (65 km^{2})	8,620 acre-feet (0.011 km^{3}) (Note: 2018–2020 data)	18.0 km (11.2 mi)	47.0 mi (75.6 km)
Mill Creek	100 sq mi (260 km^{2})	180,300 acre-feet (0.222 km^{3})	36.6 mi (58.9 km)	33.6 mi (54.1 km)
Dry Creek	239 sq mi (620 km^{2})	15,490 acre-feet (0.019 km^{3}) (Note: 1951–1965 data)	41.4 mi (66.6 km)	27.3 mi (43.9 km)
Pine Creek	160 sq mi (410 km^{2})	9,917 acre-feet (0.012 km^{3}) (Note: Median of 1970–2016 data)	39.7 mi (63.9 km)	23.4 mi (37.7 km)
Touchet River	361 sq mi (930 km^{2})	39,200 acre-feet (0.048 km^{3})	86.7 mi (139.5 km)	21.6 mi (34.8 km)
Walla Walla River	1,758 sq mi (4,550 km^{2})	462,000 acre-feet (0.57 km^{3})	51.3 miles (82.6 km) (mainstem)	—N/a

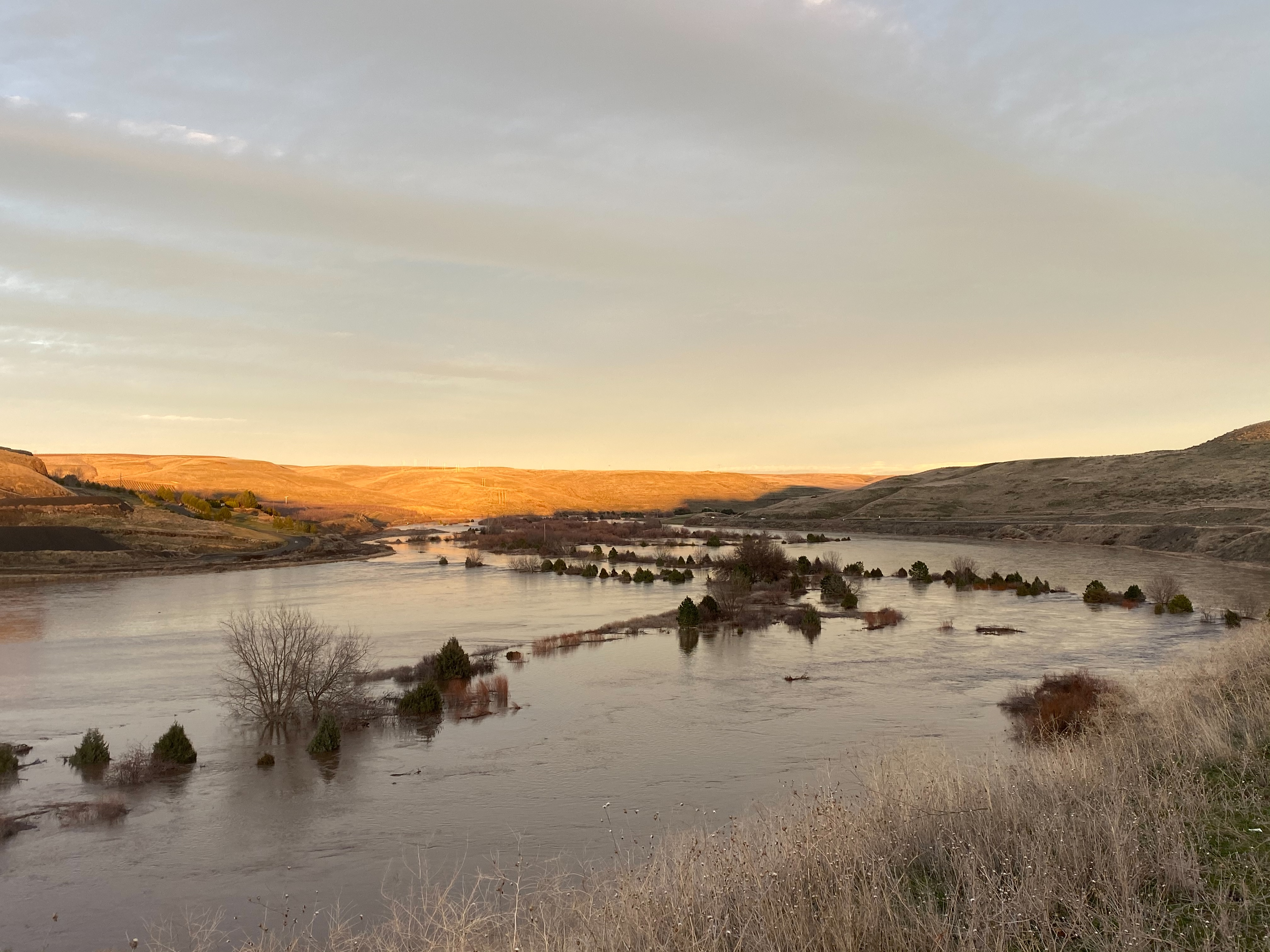
The river flooding west of Touchet, February 2020

At a measuring station near the confluence with the Touchet River, the flow rate of a 10-year flood (i.e., the largest flood expected in a ten-year period) of the Walla Walla River was estimated to be 13,900 cubic feet (390 m^{3}) per second. A 100-year flood would be expected to reach 29,400 cubic feet (830 m^{3}) per second, while a 500-year flood would be expected to hit 44,100 cubic feet (1,250 m^{3}) per second. The 100-year flood mark was exceeded in February 2020, when the river reached a high of 30,109 cubic feet (852.6 m^{3}) per second. Between 1865 and 2001, 26 major floods occurred in the Walla Walla basin.

==== Groundwater ====
Many smaller streams run out of the Blue Mountains through narrow bedrock canyons, creating alluvial fans. Much of the groundwater in the area is stored in aquifers within pockets of gravel alluvium which accumulates in the central valley and the deeper fractures within the Columbia River Basalt Group (a large basalt formation underneath the valley).

The alluvial aquifer in the Walla Walla Valley stretches up to 200 feet (61 m), both discharging water into the river through streams and springs in some areas, and receiving groundwater recharge from it in others. Wells tapping the aquifer supply water to rural areas and farms. A layer of low-permeability Pleistocene-era clay underlies much of the gravel aquifer, forming a confining unit which prevents the aquifer water from descending deeper. The transmissivity of the aquifer (the rate at which water flows) ranges between 10,000 to 60,000 sq ft (930 to 5,570 m^{2}) per day.

The basalt aquifer reaches the surface in some areas, especially around the headwaters of rivers, providing a source of water for cities, farms, and industry. The groundwater in the aquifer is estimated to be between 5,000 and 15,000 years old, potentially due to high recharge rates during the major flood events, or from distant sources of water recharge in the Blue Mountains. The basalt aquifer contains numerous thin sheets of water-bearing rock, with one well able to tap multiple layers at once. These layers are slow to recharge, and water use in some areas has drained them significantly. The transmissivity of the basalt aquifers range from under 2,000 to 10,000 sq ft (190 to 930 m^{2}) per day.

Primarily due to agricultural overuse, groundwater levels in the Walla Walla basin have been declining since the 1940s. In some areas, the level has declined as much as 150 ft (46 m). The municipal governments of both Walla Walla and Milton-Freewater have investigated using the basalt aquifer as a means of water storage, injecting water into it during the high winter flows to be used later.

==== Water quality ====
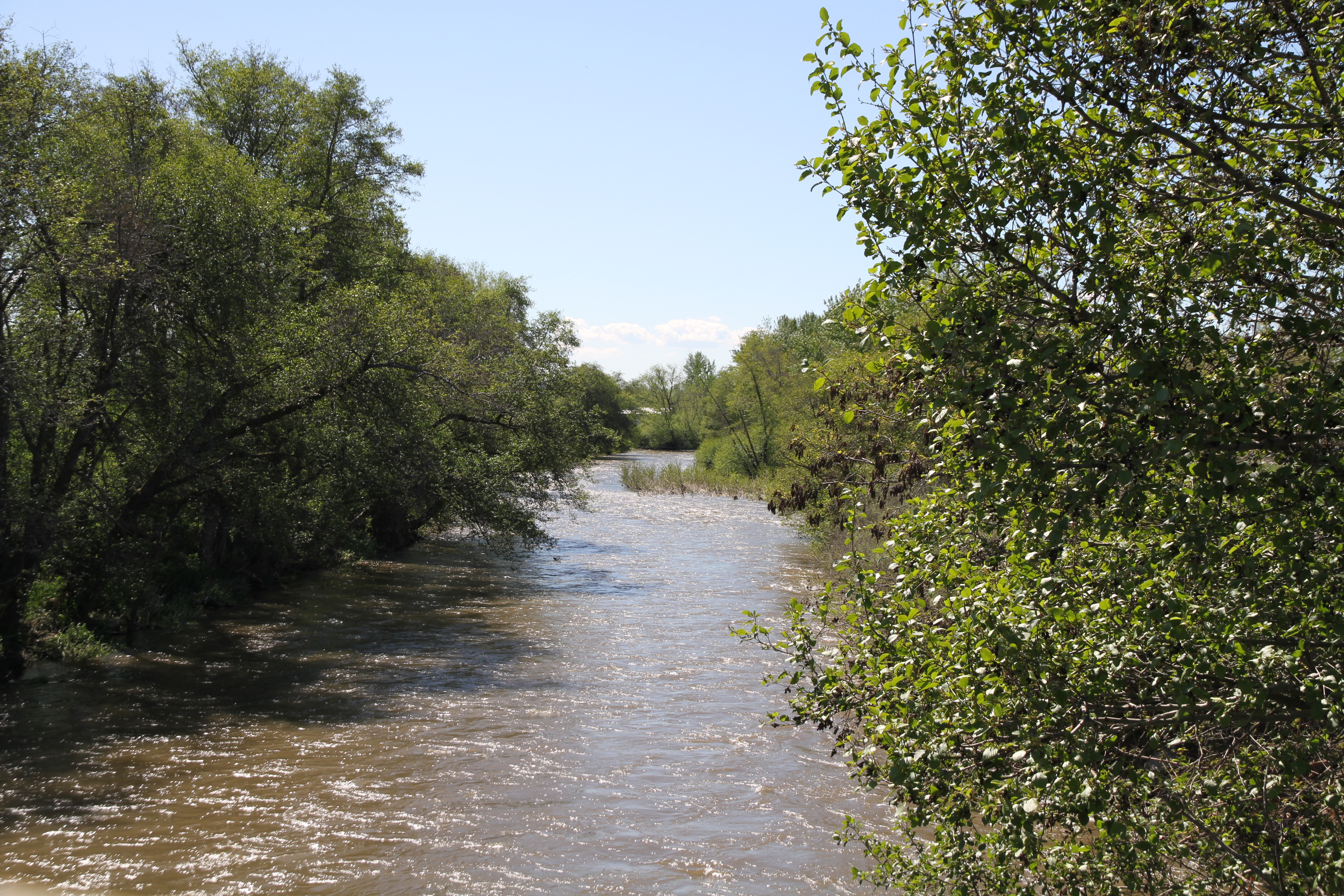
The river near Lowden, Washington

Surveys by the Washington State Department of Ecology and the Oregon Department of Environmental Quality have monitored the river for pollution. Water temperatures were found to have reached unacceptable levels on both the Washington and Oregon portions of the river. By 2021, the daily quantity of chlorinated pesticides and fecal coliform breached guidelines in the Washington portion, as did the pH of the water. Wastewater treatment plants are present in Dayton, College Place, Walla Walla, and Waitsburg.

By the 2020s, water temperature became the most consistent water quality problem across the Walla Walla watershed. Human modification of the basin through channel straightening has led to the breakdown of hyporheic exchange (interactions between surface water and groundwater at a streambed) and decreased the cooling caused by pooling and wood obstructions. Additionally, human modifications have removed riverside sources of shade and decreased total stream flow, allowing the water to heat up faster. The forks and the upper portion of the Walla Walla mainstem have cool temperatures, with temperatures increasing once the river enters its leveed portion near Milton-Freewater.

== Geology ==
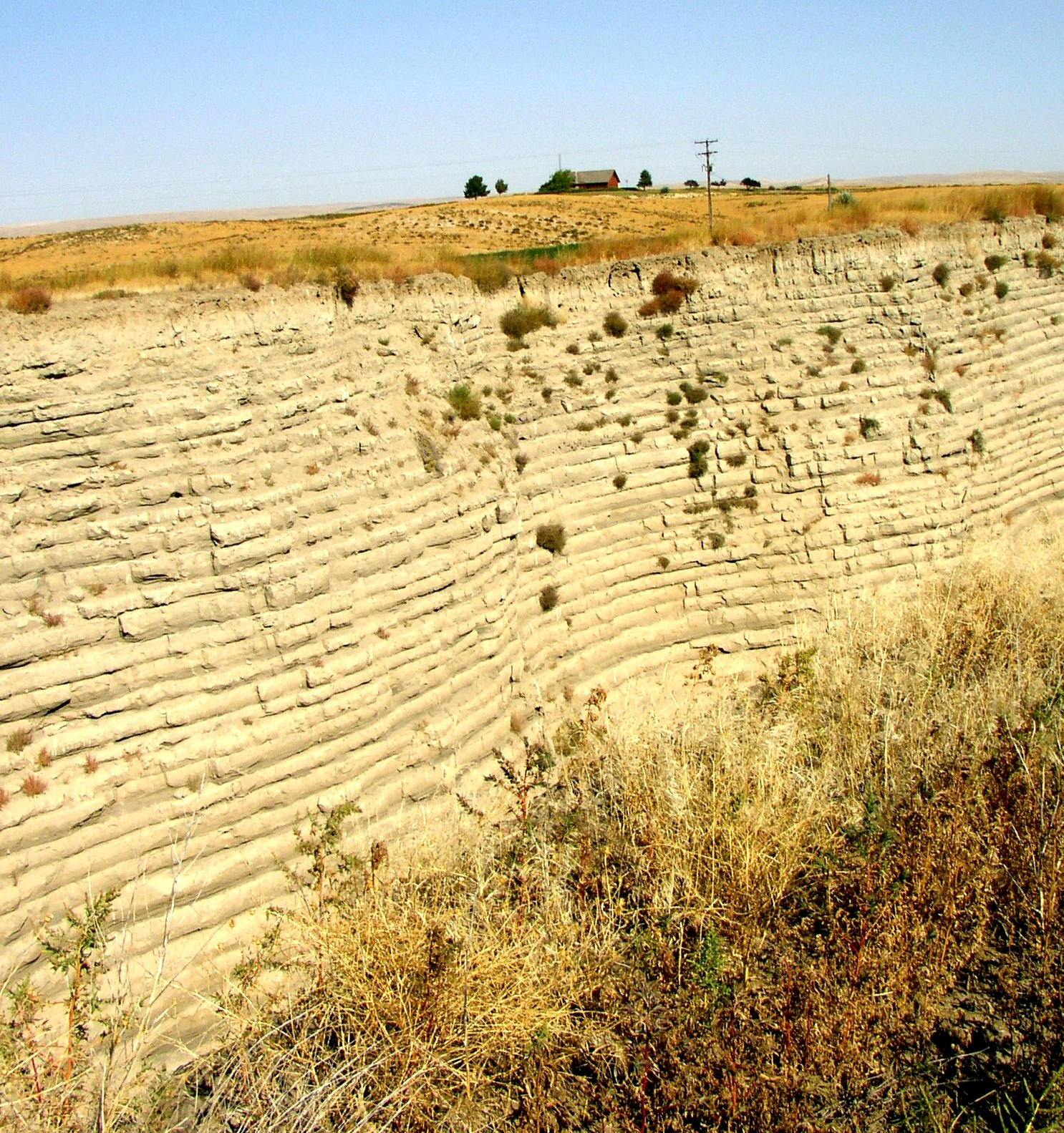
The Touchet Formation near Lowden, showing the many beds of sediment deposited during their formation

The Columbia River Basalt Group, a large igneous province consisting of expansive basalt formations dating to the Miocene, stretches across the Columbia Basin and into eastern Oregon and southern Idaho. A series of basalt formations from this group were formed from around 15.5 million to 8.5 million years ago. These formations range from tens of feet to hundreds of feet thick. The tops and bottoms of each lava flow in the formation are permeable and often fractured, allowing for groundwater to flow.

Much of the Walla Walla Valley consists of alluvium (sediment deposited by the river) in the floor of the valley, and above it beds of slackwater deposits named the Touchet Formation. These beds were deposited during the Missoula floods at the end of the Last Glacial Period, when large proglacial lakes burst through the collapsing ice wall in the Clark Fork valley. During these episodes, glacial meltwater pooled into the area behind Wallula Gap and deposited sediment in beds, forming beds ranging from a few centimeters to around 3 feet (0.9 m) thick.

The large amounts of silt and sand deposited during the formation of the beds of the Touchet Formation has also contributed to the creation of fertile soils in the region. The soil of the lower Walla Walla Valley is mainly derived from these beds, except for the region directly around the Snake and Columbia rivers, where the soil is dry and porous due to basaltic deposits. Alluvial fans have deposited large amounts of clastic sediment from the Blue Mountains across the Walla Walla Valley. A layer of loess (sediment made of accumulated wind-blown dust) up to 7 feet (2.1 m) thick covers covers over half of the Walla Walla basin and much of the larger Palouse region, forming its characteristic rolling hills.

== Biology ==
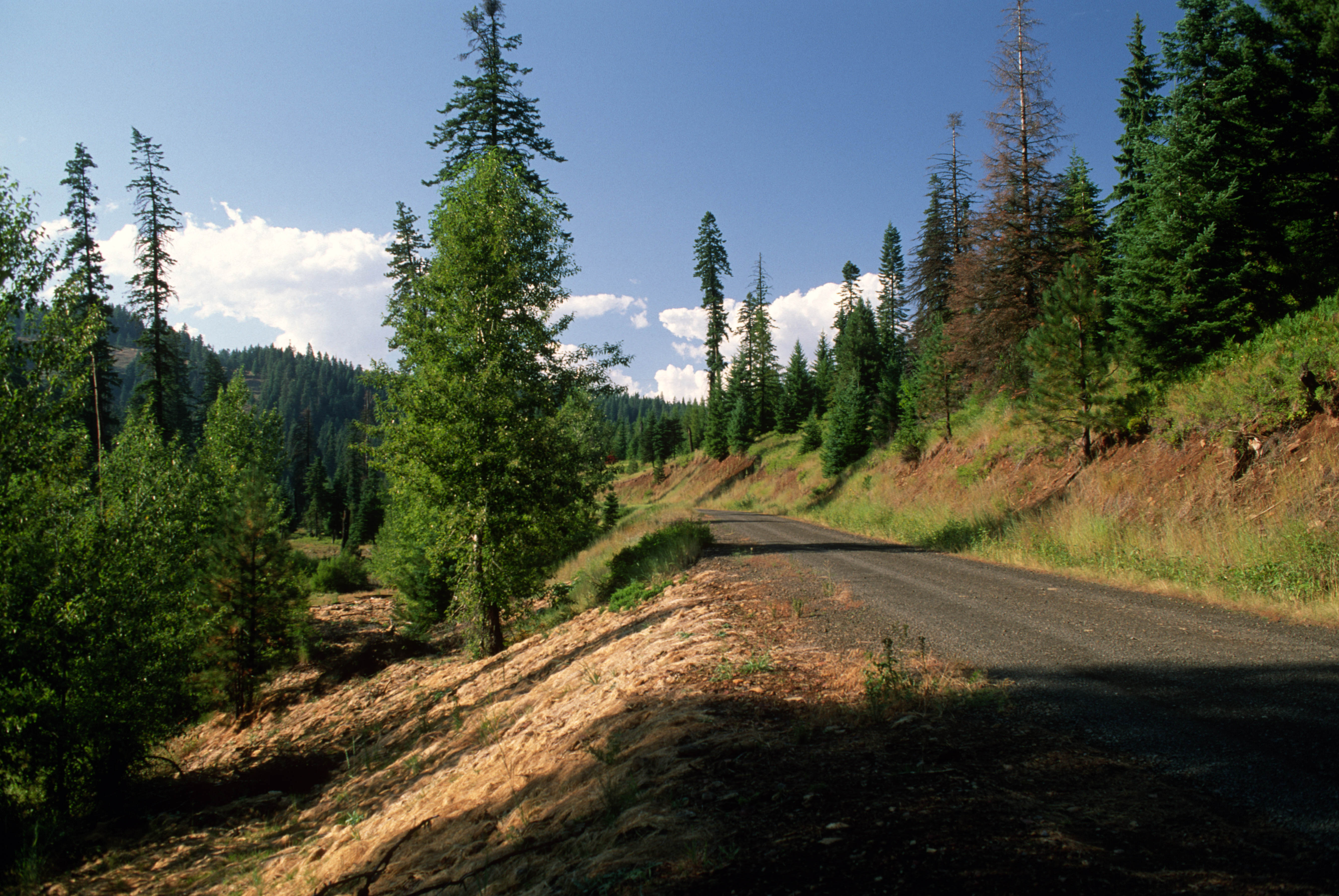
A road through the Blue Mountains in Umatilla National Forest

The upland plateaus surrounding the river were initially dominated by grass and scrub, although 77% of scrubland in the watershed has been cleared to make room for agriculture. More aggressive, invasive plant species largely displaced native grasses in the remaining portions. Common species now include Bromus tectorum (cheatgrass), Holcus lanatus (velvet grass), and Echinochloa crus-galli (barnyard grass). Chrysothamnus (rabbitbush) and Artemisia scrubs are common throughout lower elevation scrubland, with deciduous and pine trees in sheltered canyons. Douglas fir, grand fir, and ponderosa pine are the main tree species in the mountainous portions of the watershed.

Accounts by settlers in the 19th century describe wide areas of forested wetlands in the watershed. Riparian vegetation is now severely impaired by development. In portions of the lower Walla Walla River, riparian habitats have been reduced in size by 65-70%. Scrubs and small trees form the majority of the foliage in the lower riparian habitats. Cornus sericea (red-osier dogwood) and willows are common in the lowest portions, while Alnus rhombifolia (white alder), Populus trichocarpa (black cottonwood), and Populus tremuloides (quaking aspen) are common in the middle reaches. The invasive plants Elaeagnus angustifolia (Russian olive), Robinia pseudoacacia (black lotus tree) and Phalaris arundinacea (reed canarygrass) are frequently found in riparian areas of the lower watershed.

=== Fish ===
Over 30 species of fish are known to inhabit the watershed, including at least 17 who are native to it. Steelhead trout, Chinook salmon, and bull trout are important salmonid species in the watershed. Other native species include mountain whitefish, several species of sculpin and the dace genus Rhinichthys, chiselmouths, peamouths, redside shiners, northern pikeminnows, and sandrollers, as well as largescale and bridgelip suckers. Some introduced species such as smallmouth bass, white crappie, and channel catfish have become common in the lower mainstem.

Chinook salmon were once common in the river, spawning in the spring, but declined during the early 20th century. The upstream reaches of the Touchet and Walla Walla Rivers are the main spawning areas found in the watershed, as there is little suitable habitat in the lower portions of the river. The last major run of the fish in the watershed occurred in 1925, and the last documented runs were made in the 1950s. During the late 1990s, chinook of unknown origin were spotted in the Touchet River, possibly strays from the Umatilla River. Some chinook were reintroduced to the South Fork and Mill Creek in 2000 by the Confederated Tribes of the Umatilla Reservation. By the 2020s, spring-run chinook salmon could be found in the South Fork, Mill Creek, and the Mainstem.

Both Pacific lamprey and western brook lamprey were historically attested in the Walla Walla River, harvested by local tribes as a food source and medicine. Although no detailed surveys are available, western brook lampreys appear to be relatively common within the basin, while Pacific lampreys may be extinct or close to extinction within the watershed. Freshwater mussels are sporadically attested in the watershed, likely of the genera Anodonta and Margaritifera; however, little information is known on their abundance or distribution. Such freshwater shellfish were once widespread and important to native populations, but their numbers in the watershed have likely declined significantly.

=== Land animals ===
Around 10 amphibian species, 207 bird species, 69 mammal species, and 15 reptile species have been observed in the Walla Walla watershed. Large mammals include mule deer, white-tailed deer, Rocky Mountain elk, black bears, and cougars. The basin's many species of birds stand for much of its biological diversity. Focal species selected during the establishment of the McNary National Wildlife Refuge included spotted sandpipers, Canada geese, great blue herons, California quails, and downy woodpeckers.

== Land use and irrigation ==
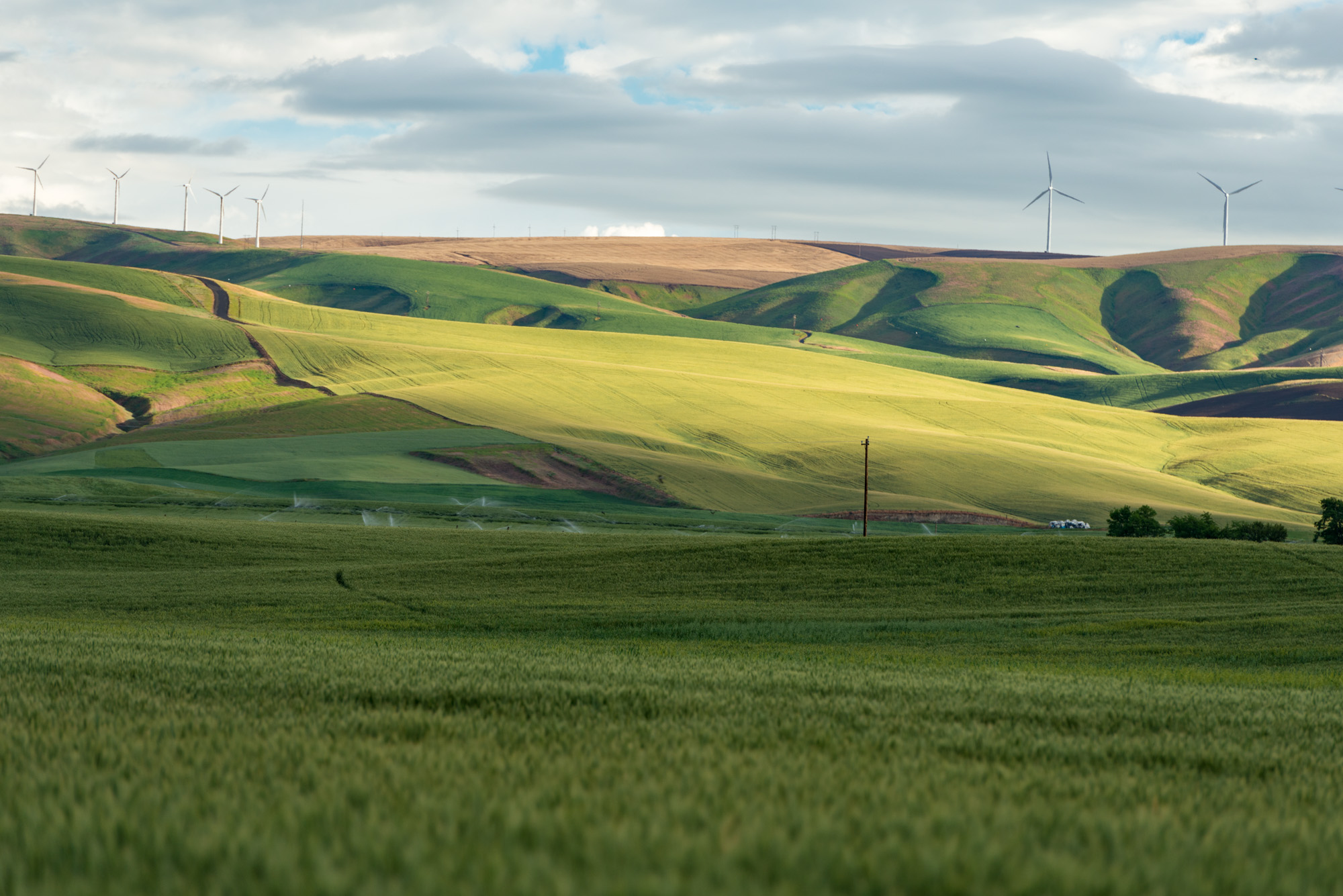
Farms and wind turbines in the Walla Walla Valley near the Oregon–Washington border

About 54% of the Walla Walla basin consists of agricultural land, including both irrigated and dryland farming. Wheat, vegetables, hay, peas, and apples are among the main crops grown in the valley, alongside onions and grapes. Walla Walla, Milton-Freewater, and College Place are the largest settlements in the watershed, although it is dotted by smaller communities such as Dayton, Dixie, Touchet, and Prescott. About 4% of the basin consists of developed land. Some land in the lower reaches of the basin is used for cattle ranching. As of 2011, irrigation in the Walla Walla basin required 92,500 acre-feet (0.114 km^{3}) of water annually, or about 255 cubic feet (7,200 L) of water per second continuously across the six months crops are commonly irrigated. The largest organizations managing irrigation in the watershed are the Gardena Farms Irrigation District #13, the Walla Walla River Irrigation District, and the Hudson Bay District Improvement Company.

The uppermost portions of the basin lie within the Umatilla National Forest, managed by the Forest Service. The middle and upper portions of both river forks within mountainous and undeveloped land. The Blue Mountains are commonly used for outdoor recreation such as fishing, hunting, and camping. Logging has historically been a major industry in this area, although reforestation has been promoted in recent years.

About 90% of the basin is privately owned. The Confederated Tribes of the Umatilla Reservation own 8,700 acres (35 km^{2}) of territory in the basin, which they use for agricultural, cultural, and environmental purposes. The Confederated Tribes have organized salmon management programs in the basin. Near the estuary of the river, the United States Fish and Wildlife Service operates the public Madame Dorian Memorial Park, used for camping and picnicking.

== Human history ==
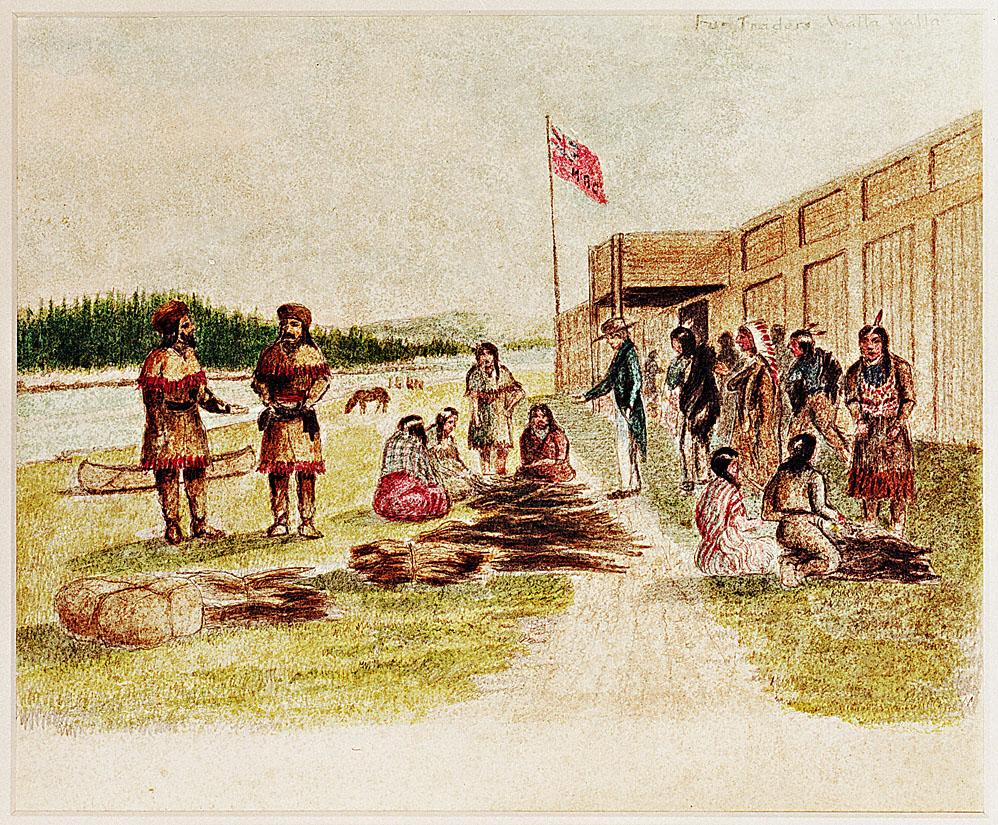
1841 illustration of Fort Nez Percés, located near the mouth of the river

Human occupation of the Columbia Plateau is attested from the Late Pleistocene, over 10,000 years ago. The Walla Walla basin lies within the historic territories of the Cayuse, Umatilla, and Walla Walla peoples. Cayuse territory stretched from the area south of the Columbia River, and through the upper portions of the Walla Walla and Umatilla River basins into the Blue Mountains. The Walla Walla people lived in the lower portion of the Walla Walla basin, with additional territories stretching across the Columbia and Snake Rivers and into the lower Yakima River valley. The Umatilla lived along the Umatilla River and its tributaries, up to its confluence with the Columbia. The indigenous peoples lived as seasonally-nomadic hunter-gatherers, making use of fire to promote the growth of useful plants. The name Walla Walla derives from the Sahaptin word walla, meaning "water". The reduplicated walla walla can refer to running water or "many waters". The Corps of Discovery, the U.S. army unit which made the Lewis and Clark Expedition, passed through the Walla Walla Valley in 1805. The Canadian fur trader Alexander Ross explored the region in 1811. In 1818, the fur trader Donald McKenzie, employed by the Montreal-based North West Company, established Fort Nez Percés near the mouth of the Walla Walla to compete with John Jacob Astor's American Fur Company. After the NWC merged into the Hudson's Bay Company (HBC) in 1821, the HBC began to pursue an aggressive policy of fur trapping and trading in the Columbia Basin, seeking to eradicate the regions beavers in order to block off American trappers from obtaining fur. Soon after the establishment of the fort, McKenzie dug a set of ditches to irrigate the gardens around the fort; the first irrigation canals constructed in the basin.

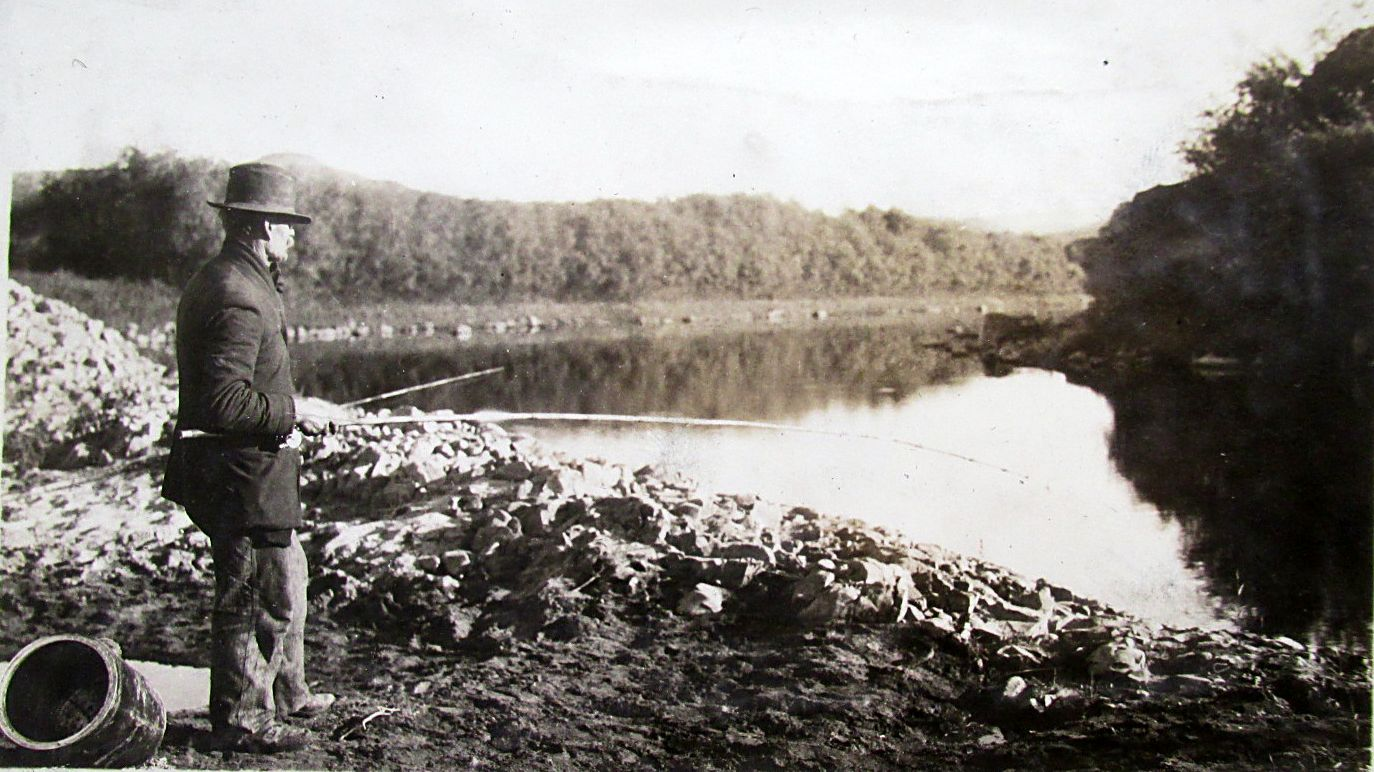
A man fishing near the mouth of the river, 1919

The American missionary Marcus Whitman arrived in the basin in 1836 and established a mission. Increasing tensions between the Cayuse and White settlers led to the 1847 Whitman massacre where a small group of Cayuse killed 13 settlers, including Whitman, sparking the Cayuse War. The war was settled by the treaties of the 1855 Walla Walla Council, between the United States government and a coalition of tribal nations. The watershed was ceded to the federal government under the treaties, under which the native nations reserved the right to harvest salmon and plants. The treaties was ratified in 1859, and the Cayuse, alongside later the Umatilla and Walla Walla, were forced to settle in the Umatilla Indian Reservation. War between the American military and the Walla Walla people soon resumed, and a lasting peace would not be established until 1858.

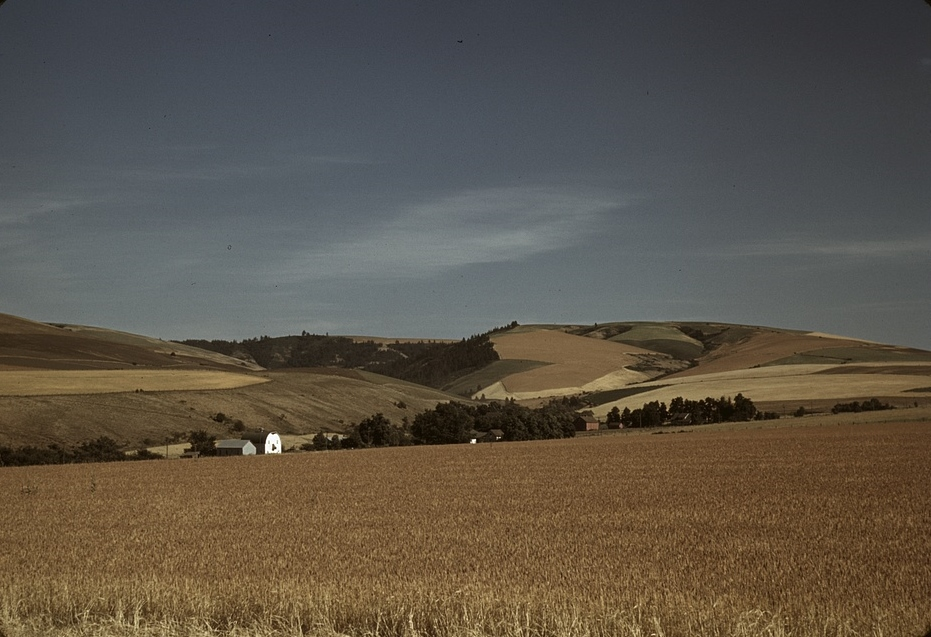
Wheat fields in the Walla Walla Valley, 1941

The growth of the Oregon Trail during the 1840s and 1850s brought large numbers of American settlers into the Pacific Northwest. An army stockade named Fort Walla Walla, named for the abandoned HBC post, was constructed northeast of the river and began to attract a small number of settlers in the 1850s. The region was officially declared open for settlement in 1859, and a group of commissioners elected for the newly-formed Walla Walla County declared the new city of Walla Walla at the site of the fort. The town grew quickly during the short Idaho Gold Rush of the early 1860s, and it was briefly the largest city in Washington Territory.

By the 1870s, Walla Walla had become a center of grain farming. The introduction of tractors in the early 20th century greatly expanded agricultural production in the region, encouraging farmers to clear riparian habitats for cropland and make modifications to streams to protect and irrigate crops. The Walla Walla Valley became known for its onions, and, by the late 20th century, its wine industry. The growth of the wine industry and tourism in Walla Walla and Milton-Freewater has led to increased urban development, stressing water resources.

=== River management ===
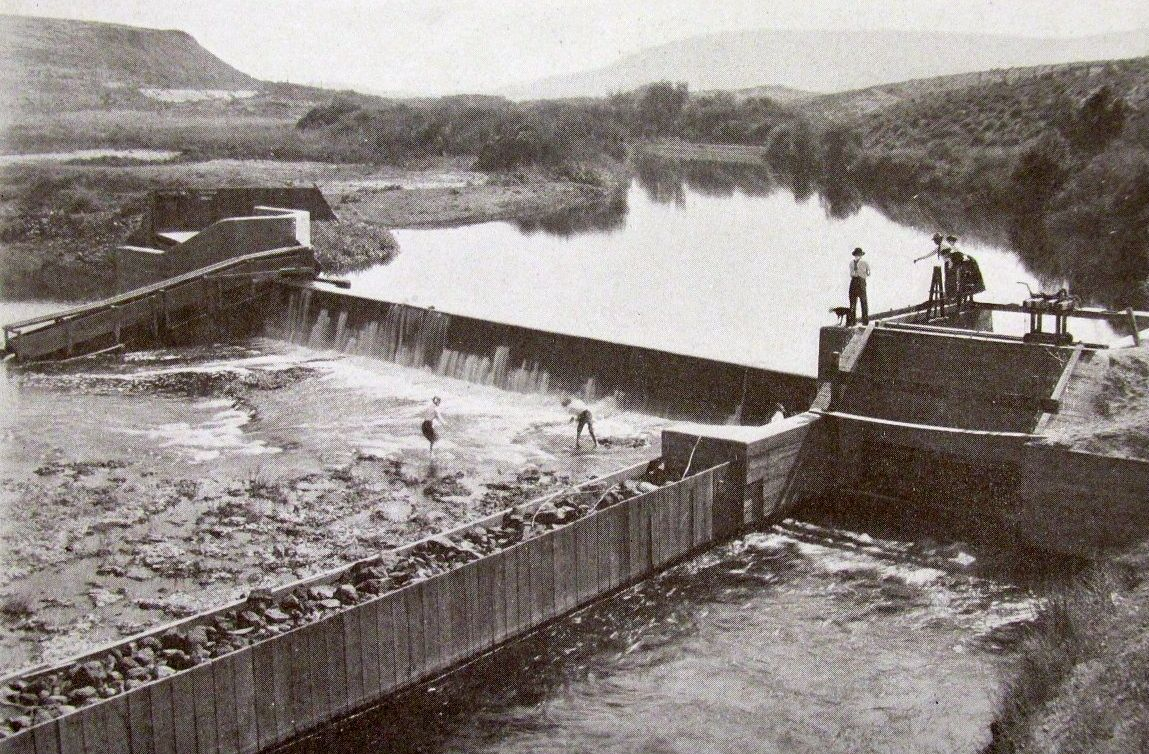
The Nine Mile Dam in 1912

During the late 1800s, a head-gate (water control structure placed at the entrance of a channel) was built at the source of the Little Walla Walla River, greatly reducing the amount of water which could flow through the stream and its own distributaries. This water was diverted in the largest and easternmost branch of the river, the Tumalum Branch, enlarging it into a definite mainstem. The Little Walla Walla distributary network was repurposed for use for irrigation. Springs and groundwater in the basin continue to feed these distributary streams, which flow north into the Walla Walla in Washington.

The Nine Mile Dam was constructed on the lower reaches of the river in 1905. This impeded fish access to the watershed, and allowed for the diversion of enough water for the river to run completely dry during the summers. The Walla Walla stopped short of the Columbia every summer for almost a century afterwards.

During the late 1920s and early 1930s, court adjudication reexamined surface water rights across the Washington portion of the watershed; however, the Washington state government and Oregon state governments disputed water allocation rights. This led to the 1936 US Supreme Court case Washington v. Oregon, with the Washington government alleging that the Oregon was unlawfully diverting water from entering the state. The Supreme Court ruled that Oregon had the right to divert any amount of water from within its borders. During the case, the two state governments agreed to manage smaller interstate streams in the basin, such as Pine Creek, under prior-appropriation water rights (with water reserved to the earliest attested user), but not the main stem of the Walla Walla or its interstate distributaries. Later water conservation efforts in Oregon reduced groundwater seepage, further reducing the proportion of water which entered Washington.

A major flood hit the Walla Walla Valley in 1931, leading the Army Corps of Engineers to take flood control measures in the region. In 1935, the Mill Creek Flood Control District was formed, and from 1935 to 1939, a large concrete channel was constructed using Works Progress Administration funding to constrain the creek as it passed through the city. The construction of new dams in Idaho and eastern Washington prompted the Corps of Engineers to build a new district office in Walla Walla in 1948. The McNary Dam on the Columbia was finished in 1958, creating a large reservoir named Lake Wallula which flooded the lower 9 to 10 miles (14 to 16 km) of the lower Walla Walla Valley. Sediment carried by the Walla Walla eventually created a new delta at the mouth of the Columbia River. In the early 2000s, a group of local residents worked with the Washington State Department of Ecology to institute a new water management plan for the basin, emphasizing local control over water usage. After a series of reports in 2007, the state legislature created the Walla Walla Watershed Management Partnership based on these plans.

== Notes ==
=== Bibliography ===
- Cascadia Consulting Group; AMP Insights; Northwest Land & Water, Inc; Sound Resolutions (2021). Walla Walla Water 2050 Strategic Plan (PDF) (Report). Washington State Department of Ecology.
- Confederated Tribes of the Umatilla Indian Reservation (2024). Upper Walla Walla Assessment & Action Plan (PDF) (Report).
- Derkey, Robert E.; Stradling, Dale F.; Lindsey, Kevin A.; Tolan, Terry L. (2006). Geologic Map of the College Place and Walla Walla 7.5-minute Quadrangles, Walla Walla County, Washington, and Umatilla County, Oregon (PDF) (Report). Washington State Department of Natural Resources.
- Frasser, Elisabeth T.; Dunn, Sarah B. (2022). Groundwater and Surface-Water Data Collection for the Walla Walla River Basin, Washington, 2018–22 (PDF) (Report). United States Geological Survey. doi:10.3133/dr1163.
- Hanson, Alfred L.; Mitchell, Steve (1977). Walla Walla River Basin (PDF) (Report). Washington State Department of Ecology.
- Karson, Jennifer, ed. (2006). Wiyaxayxt / Wiyaakaa'awn / As Days Go By: Our History, Our Land, Our People: The Cayuse, Umatilla, and Walla Walla. University of Washington Press. ISBN 9780295805917. JSTOR j.ctvcwnggs.
- LeMoine, Michael; Stohr, Anita (2002). Walla Walla River Tributaries Temperature Total Maximum Daily Load (PDF) (Report). Washington State Department of Ecology.
- Long, Andy; Garcia, Amanda; Johnson, Hank; Welch, Wendy (2021). A Cooperative Study of the Walla Walla River Basin Groundwater System, Oregon-Washington (PDF) (Report). United States Geological Survey.
- Mapes, B. E. (1969). Sediment Transport by Streams in the Walla Walla River Basin, Washington and Oregon, July 1962–June 1965 (PDF) (Report). United States Geological Survey.
- Draft Walla Walla Subbasin Summary (PDF) (Report). Northwest Power Planning Council. 2001.
- 2005–08 Walla Walla Subbasin Stream Temperature Total Maximum Daily Load and Water Quality Management Plan (Report). Oregon Department of Environmental Quality. 2005.
  - Appendix A: Stream Temperature Analysis, Vegetation, Hydrology and Morphology: Walla Walla Basin.
- Pacific Groundwater Group (1995). Draft Initial Watershed Assessment: Water Resources Inventory Area 22, Walla Walla River Watershed (PDF) (Report). Washington State Department of Ecology.
- Pickett, Paul J. (2011). Walla Walla Watershed Planning Area: Prediction of Gauged Streamflows by Modeling (PDF) (Report). Washington State Department of Ecology.
- Robinson, Trevor (2016). Revisiting Many Waters: An Evaluation of the Walla Walla Water Management Initiative (PDF) (Report). William D. Ruckelshaus Center.
- Ross, Jim (2014). Walla Walla Watershed Bacteria, pH, and Dissolved Oxygen Total Maximum Daily Load Effectiveness Monitoring: Water Quality Study Design (Quality Assurance Project Plan) (PDF) (Report). Washington State Department of Ecology.
- Tetra Tech (2014). Lower Walla Walla River Geomorphic Assessment and Action Plan (PDF) (Report). Confederated Tribes of the Umatilla Indian Reservation.
- United States Army Corps of Engineers (2013). Walla Walla River Basin: No Action Report (PDF) (Report). Archived from the original (PDF) on April 6, 2024.
- United States Bureau of Reclamation (1999). Watershed Action Plan: Upper Walla Walla River Subbasin, Umatilla County, Oregon (PDF) (Report). Walla Walla Basin Watershed Council.
- Walla Walla Basin Watershed Council (2004). Walla Walla Subbasin Plan (Report).
  - Appendix B: Walla Walla Subbasin Assessment, General Overview Components
  - Appendix C: Aquatic Assessment
  - Appendix E: Species of Interest
- Walla Walla Basin Watershed Council (2023). Upper Walla Walla Ground-Based Habitat Assessment (PDF) (Report).
- Walla Walla Basin Watershed Council (2020). Couse Creek Watershed Assessment and Action Plan (PDF) (Report).
- Washington State Department of Ecology (2008). Walla Walla Watershed Management Partnership: A Proposal for a Pilot Local Water Management Program in the Walla Walla Basin (PDF) (Report).
- Wolcott, Brian (2010). Little Walla Walla River Assessment and Initial Action Plan (Report). Walla Walla Basin Watershed Council.
- Wolcott, Brian (2019). Pine Creek Reservoir Study (PDF) (Report). Oregon Water Resources Department.
