= Frenchtown, Washington =

Coordinates: 46°02′55″N 118°30′48″W

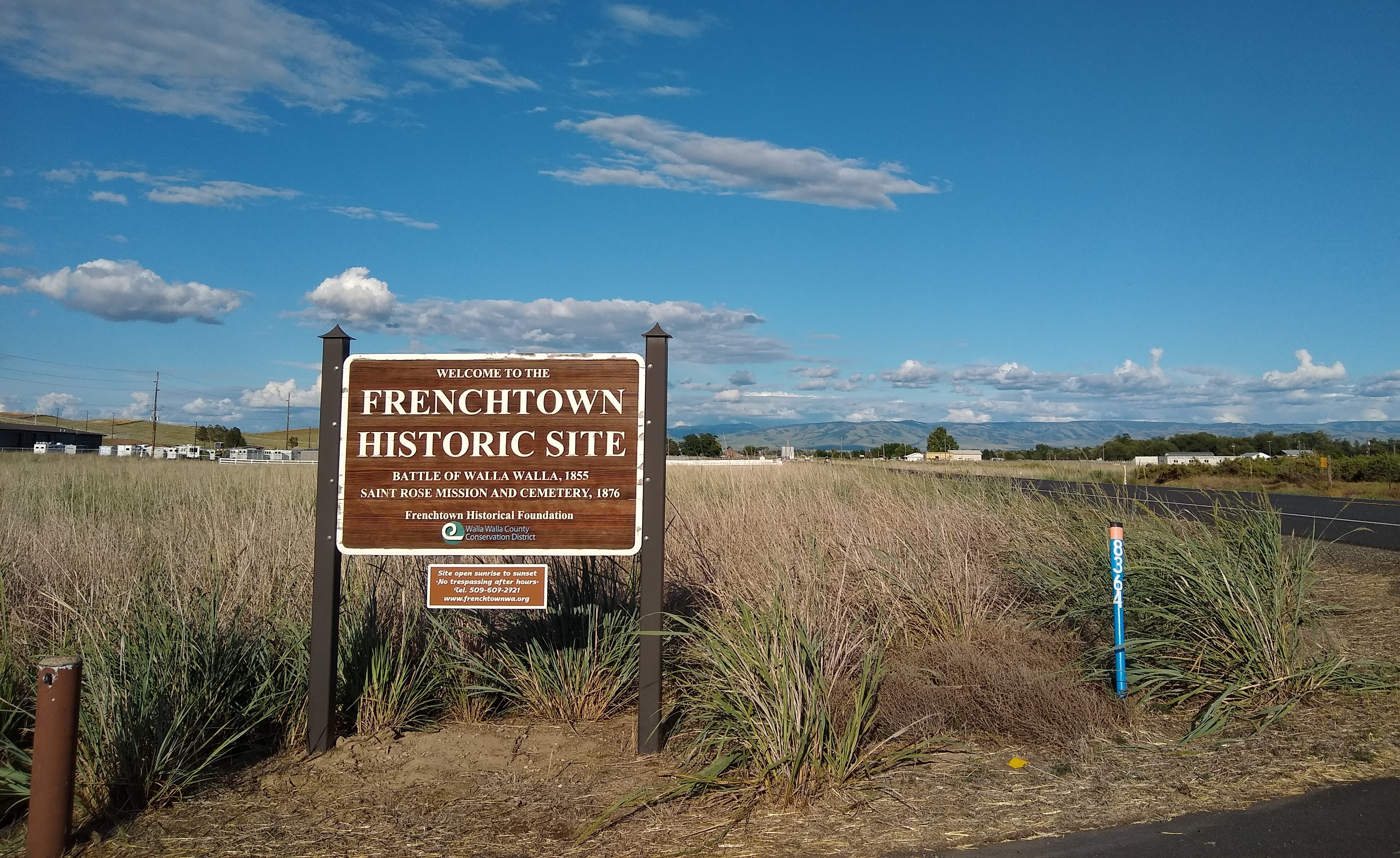
Sign to the historical settlement of Frenchtown, Washington from Highway 12

Frenchtown was a settlement in the Pacific Northwest established by Métis and French Canadian fur traders in the 19th century. It was located in Walla Walla County, Washington, United States. Originally called "le village des Canadiens", it became known as "Frenchtown" by later settlers, similar to other settlements such as Frenchtown, Montana. It has also been referred to as "Walla Walla Frenchtown". The area is currently a historical site maintained by the Frenchtown Historical Foundation. After most French Canadian and Métis residents were expelled in 1855, the area was largely resettled by Americans and the community closest to it was renamed Lowden in 1915.

== History ==
Michel Pellissier and Catherine D'Aubuchan built the first cabin in 1823. Joseph LaRocque and Lizette Walla Walla built the second one in 1824, according to best estimates. Retired Canadian Métis fur traders continued to settle and marry into the local tribes. Roughly twenty French Canadian Métis and twenty Ojibwe, Cree, and Iroquois formed the core population of the settlement. This would evolve into a mixed ancestry village of log cabins and Indian camps scattered over approximately 50 sq mi (130 km^{2}). Fifty Métis families lived in the area by 1847, as estimated by counting the number of cabins on Thomas Bergevin’s map.

Following various Indigenous uprisings throughout the Territory of Washington and escalating pressure from settlers arriving on the Oregon Trail, the US Army declared in October 1855 that the Walla Walla valley was under martial law and that all residents, including Métis, had to vacate the valley immediately. The order was challenged and a few Frenchtown Métis stayed. Hostilities soon followed. Without any supervision or permission from the US Army, the Oregon Mounted Volunteers (OMV) engaged in the Battle of Walla Walla that followed. The US Army refused to pay or equip the Willamette Valley Volunteers, so they “lived off the land”. Food, horses, and supplies were stolen. The "Battle of Frenchtown" (December 7–10, 1855) was the longest Indigenous battle in the history of the Washington Territory. The Frenchtown Métis community was shattered, with many families scattering around the Pacific Northwest and some returning to Canada. Americans filed claims on the land that had been vacated. However, many former Frenchtowners remained in the area, and their descendants maintained a small French-speaking Catholic community until the 1880s.

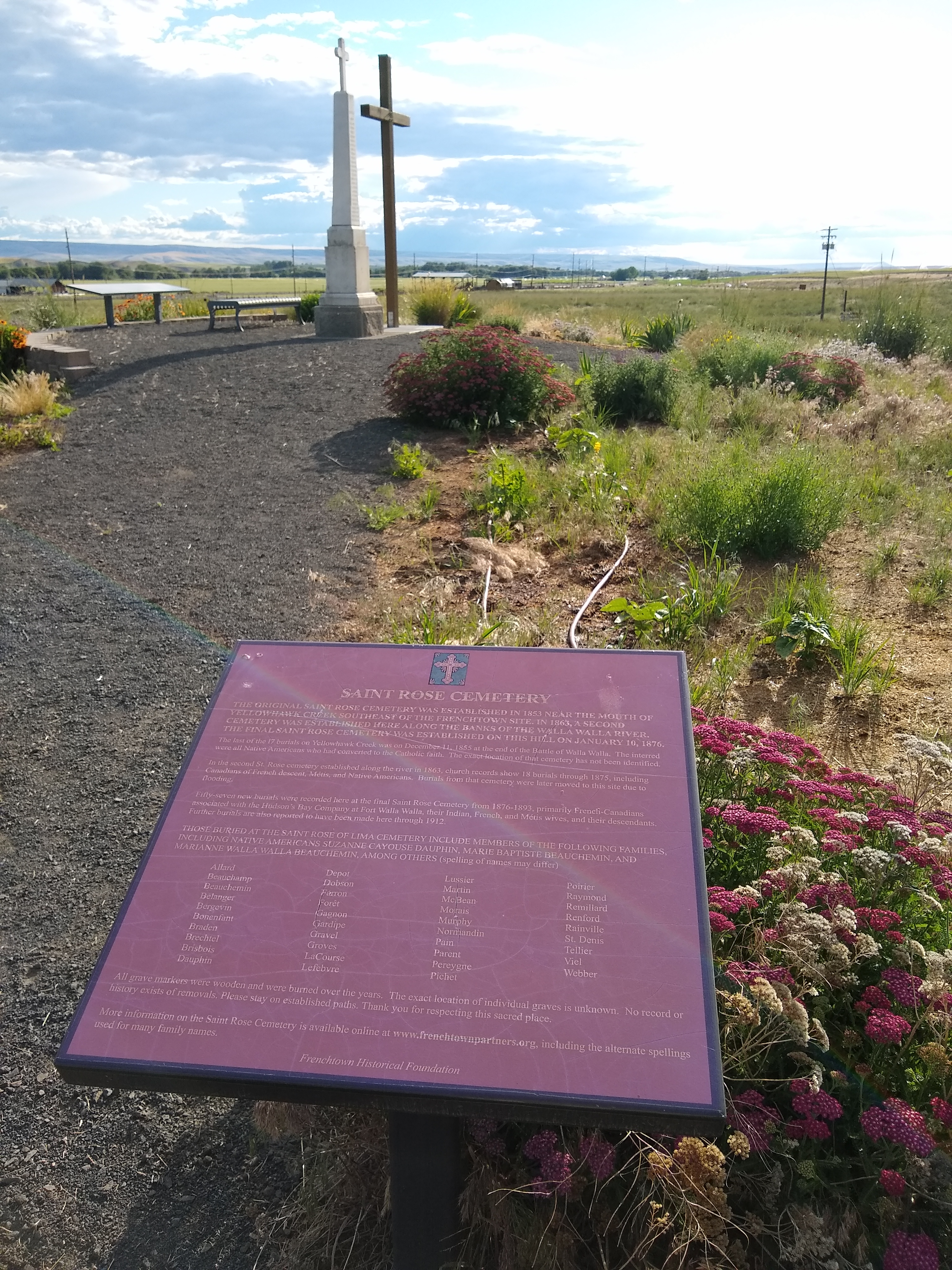
Saint Rose Cemetery interpretive sign and memorial crosses at Frenchtown, Washington

The original Saint Rose Cemetery was established in 1853 at the site of the Saint Rose of the Cayuse Mission on Yellow Hawk Creek. The 1853 Mission house was burned during the war of 1855. A log chapel was subsequently built on the McBean land claim in 1863. After a few years the St. Rose Mission and cemetery were moved to a site on the Walla Walla River now owned by the Allen family. In 1876, the river burials were moved to a hill at the Frenchtown site and the Saint Rose of Lima Mission Church was erected on the lower portion of the site, which served the French-Canadian community in the area until about 1900. Nearby the city of Walla Walla was established in 1859 and incorporated in 1862. For a while, Walla Walla was the largest community in the Washington Territory. In 1915, the name of the area was changed from Frenchtown to Lowden.

The Frenchtown Historical Foundation was first organized in 1992 to rehabilitate the historical site. It acquired the land for the present-day historic site, including the cemetery, in 2005. A formal opening of the site and re-dedication of the St. Rose of Lima cemetery occurred in 2010 in collaboration with the Confederated Tribes of the Umatilla Indian Reservation. Relocation and restoration of the "Prince’s cabin" was completed in 2016. Originally located near the Whitman Mission, the cabin is believed to be the oldest standing cabin in the state of Washington. It was built for a Cayuse Indian whom the Hudson’s Bay Company called “The Prince” circa 1837. The Frenchtown Historic Site is currently maintained by the Frenchtown Historical Foundation of Walla Walla.
