= Yellowhawk Creek =

Stream in Washington, U.S.

Coordinates: 46°01′00″N 118°24′03″W

Yellowhawk Creek is a stream in the U.S. state of Washington. It is a distributary of Mill Creek, and flows into the Walla Walla River south of College Place.

Yellowhawk Creek was named after Chief Petumromusmus (Yellowhawk), a Cayuse leader.

== See also ==
- List of rivers of Washington (state)
