= Washington v. Oregon =

- Supreme Court of the United States

Original jurisdiction Decided March 2, 1936
- Full case name: State of Washington v. State of Oregon
- Citations: 297 U.S. 517 (more)

Outcome
- A state has the power to divert all rivers within its borders.

Court membership
- Chief Justice Charles E. Hughes Associate Justices Willis Van Devanter · James C. McReynolds; Louis Brandeis · George Sutherland; Pierce Butler · Harlan F. Stone; Owen Roberts · Benjamin N. Cardozo

Case opinion
- Majority: Cardozo, joined by unanimous

Washington v. Oregon, 297 U.S. 517 (1936), was a United States Supreme Court case in which the court held that a state has the power to divert all rivers within its borders. The dispute was over the Walla Walla River.
