= Walla Walla Basin Watershed Council =

Walla Walla Basin Watershed Council (WWBWC)
- Abbreviation: WWBWC
- Named after: Walla Walla Basin Watershed
- Formation: May 18, 1994
- Founded at: Milton-Freewater, Oregon, United States
- Type: Nonprofit organization
- Legal status: Active
- Purpose: The Walla Walla Basin Watershed Council's (WWBWC) mission is to enhance, restore, and protect the Walla Walla watershed while supporting a sustainable economy.
- Headquarters: 810 S Main St., Milton-Freewater, Oregon, United States
- Region served: Walla Walla Basin Watershed (Oregon and Washington)
- Services: Education, Restoration, Monitoring, Pesticide Stewardship Partnership, Assessments, Surveys, Community Outreach
- Fields: Watershed management
- Official language: English
- Revenue: Grant funding
- Funding: Oregon Watershed Enhancement Board (OWEB), Bonneville Power Administration, several other public and private funders.

The Walla Walla Basin Watershed Council (WWBWC) is a non-profit organization in the U.S. states of Washington and Oregon that fosters education and cooperation among parties with interests in the Walla Walla Basin Watershed. The WWBWC is jointly led by the state governments of Washington and Oregon, and the Confederated Tribes of the Umatilla Indian Reservation, along with the involvement of community members and local governments in both states. Through this cooperation, the council leads efforts to improve and maintain a healthy watershed for fish, invertebrates, plants, and people. The WWBWC is located in Milton-Freewater, Oregon and was recognized by the Umatilla County Commissioners on May 18, 1994.

The mission of the WWBWC is to protect the resources of the Walla Walla Watershed, address issues in advance of resource degradation, and enhance the overall health of the watershed, while also protecting, as far as possible, the welfare, customs, and cultures of all citizens residing in the basin.

Grant funding for WWBWC activities has come from a variety of sources, including the Oregon Watershed Enhancement Board (OWEB) and the Bonneville Power Administration.
