= Little Walla Walla River =

Coordinates: 45.945135°N 118.393577°W

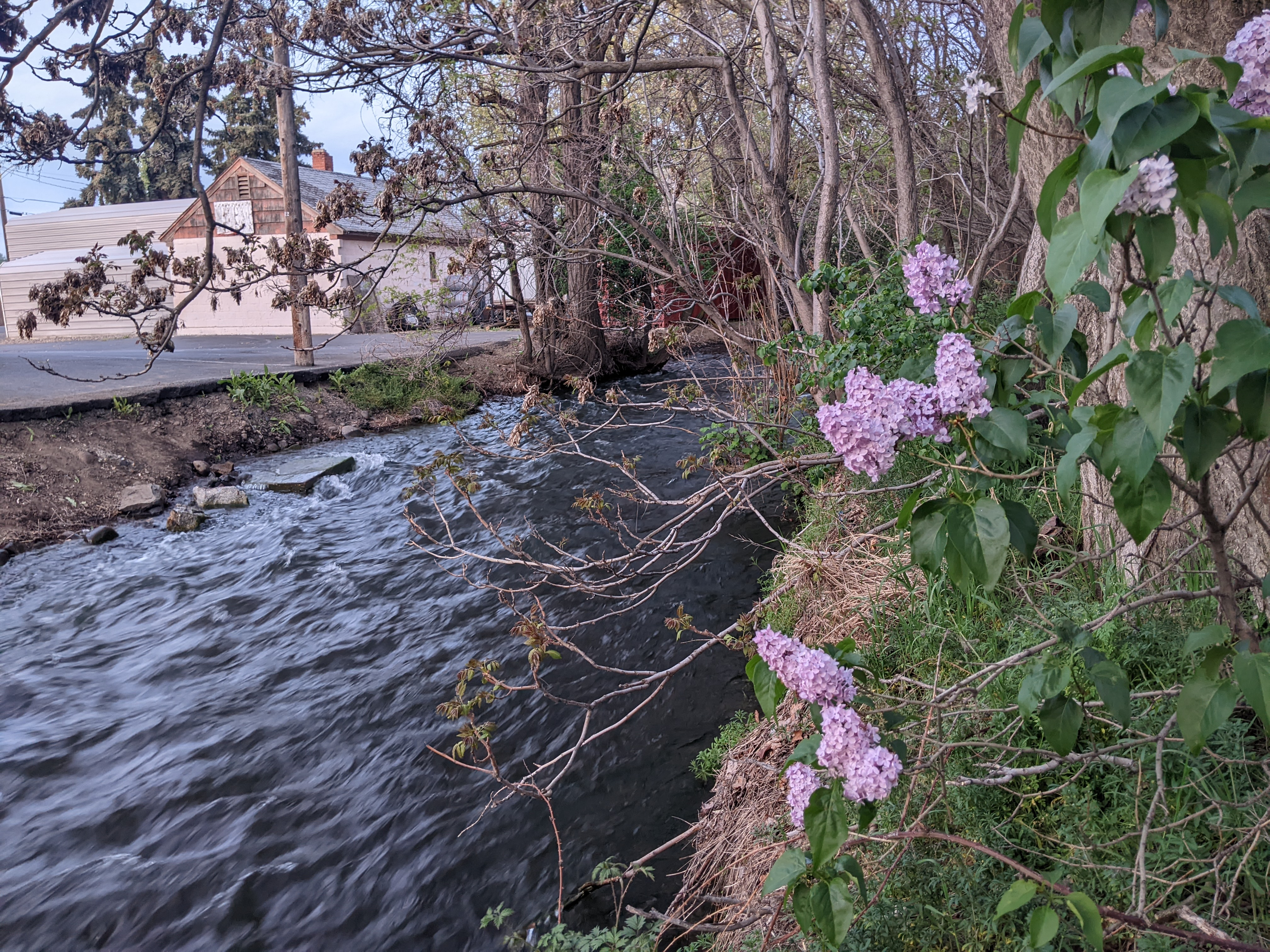

Location
- Country: United States
- State: Oregon
- County: Umatilla

Little Walla Walla River is a stream in the U.S. state of Oregon.

== See also ==
- List of rivers of Oregon
