= Dixie, Washington =

- CDP
- Location of Dixie, Washington
- Coordinates: 46°08′26″N 118°09′07″W
- Country: United States
- State: Washington
- County: Walla Walla

Area
  - Total: 0.50 sq mi (1.3 km^{2})
  - Land: 0.50 sq mi (1.3 km^{2})
  - Water: 0 sq mi (0.0 km^{2})
- Elevation: 1,562 ft (476 m)

Population (2020)
  - Total: 225
  - Density: 450/sq mi (170/km^{2})
- Time zone: UTC-8 (Pacific (PST))
  - Summer (DST): UTC-7 (PDT)
- ZIP code: 99329
- Area code: 509
- FIPS code: 53-18055
- GNIS feature ID: 2408673

Dixie is a census-designated place (CDP) in Walla Walla County, Washington, United States. As of the 2020 census, Dixie had a population of 225.

A post office called Dixie has been in operation since 1881. The community has one elementary school, which is administered by the Dixie School District, and feeds older students into Pioneer Middle School and Walla Walla High School in Walla Walla Public Schools.

Dixie derives its name from the eponymous song.

== Geography ==
According to the United States Census Bureau, the CDP has a total area of 0.5 square miles (1.3 km^{2}), all of it land.

== Demographics ==
Historical population
Census	Pop.	Note	%±
2000	220		—
2010	197		−10.5%
2020	225		14.2%
U.S. Decennial Census; 1970 1980 1990; 2000 2010

Dixie first appeared as a census designated place in the 2000 U.S. census.

=== Racial and ethnic composition ===
Dixie CDP, Washington – Racial and ethnic composition Note: the US Census treats Hispanic/Latino as an ethnic category. This table excludes Latinos from the racial categories and assigns them to a separate category. Hispanics/Latinos may be of any race.
Race / Ethnicity (NH = Non-Hispanic)	Pop 2000	Pop 2010	Pop 2020	% 2000	% 2010	% 2020
White alone (NH)	196	182	184	89.09%	92.39%	81.78%
Black or African American alone (NH)	0	0	1	0.00%	0.00%	0.44%
Native American or Alaska Native alone (NH)	8	1	6	3.64%	0.51%	2.67%
Asian alone (NH)	0	0	0	0.00%	0.00%	0.00%
Native Hawaiian or Pacific Islander alone (NH)	0	0	0	0.00%	0.00%	0.00%
Other race alone (NH)	0	0	3	0.00%	0.00%	1.33%
Mixed race or Multiracial (NH)	3	2	17	1.36%	1.02%	7.56%
Hispanic or Latino (any race)	13	12	14	5.91%	6.09%	6.22%
Total	220	197	225	100.00%	100.00%	100.00%

=== 2000 census ===
As of the census of 2000, there were 220 people, 84 households, and 63 families residing in the CDP. The population density was 428.2 people per square mile (165.3 people/km^{2}). There were 87 housing units at an average density of 169.3 units per square mile (65.4 units/km^{2}). The racial makeup of the CDP was 90.45% White, 3.64% Native American, 4.55% from other races, and 1.36% from two or more races. Hispanic or Latino of any race were 5.91% of the population.

There were 84 households, out of which 26.2% had children under the age of 18 living with them, 67.9% were married couples living together, 4.8% had a female householder with no husband present, and 25.0% were non-families. 20.2% of all households were made up of individuals, and 6.0% had someone living alone who was 65 years of age or older. The average household size was 2.62 and the average family size was 3.00.

In the CDP, the age distribution of the population shows 22.7% under the age of 18, 6.8% from 18 to 24, 25.5% from 25 to 44, 31.4% from 45 to 64, and 13.6% who were 65 years of age or older. The median age was 42 years. For every 100 females, there were 107.5 males. For every 100 females age 18 and over, there were 104.8 males.

The median income for a household in the CDP was $33,125, and the median income for a family was $40,714. Males had a median income of $29,583 versus $19,000 for females. The per capita income for the CDP was $24,650. About 7.1% of families and 9.9% of the population were below the poverty line, including 28.6% of those under the age of eighteen and none of those 65 or over.
