= Lowden, Washington =

Unincorporated community in Washington, United States

- Unincorporated community
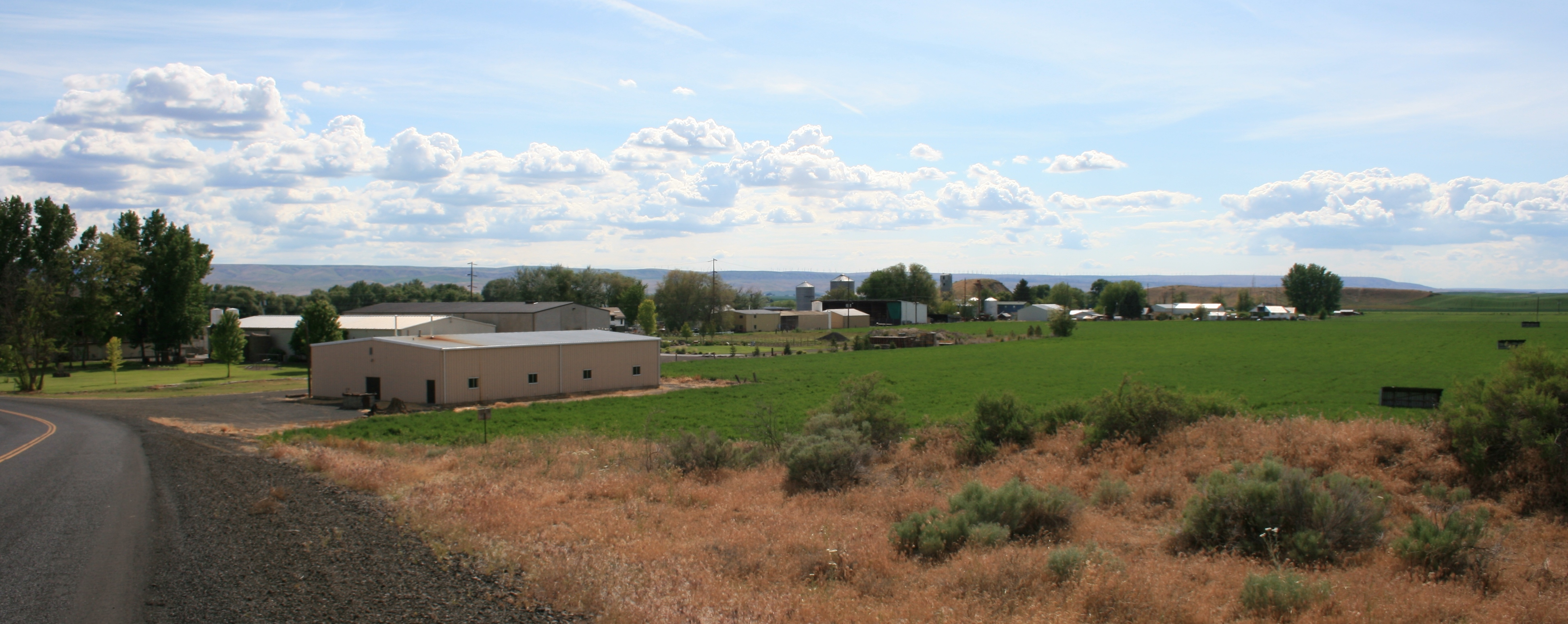
- Photo of Lowden as seen from the north

- Location within Washington (state) Location within the United States
- Coordinates: 46°03′22″N 118°35′09″W
- Country: United States
- State: Washington
- County: Walla Walla
- Elevation: 492 ft (150 m)
- Time zone: UTC-8 (Pacific (PST))
  - Summer (DST): UTC-7 (PDT)
- ZIP codes: 99362
- GNIS feature ID: 1512406

Lowden is an unincorporated community in Walla Walla County, Washington, United States. Originally an early Pacific Northwest mixed ancestry settlement called Frenchtown sometimes referred as a French Canadian or a Métis settlement, it was renamed in 1915 after local farmer and rancher Francis M. Lowden. It lies along U.S. Route 12 between Wallula and Walla Walla. Dunning Irrigation, Woodward Canyon Winery, l'Ecole 41 Winery and many family farm operations are located in Lowden.

Frenchtown Hall, a gathering place for the local community sits in town.

The Battle of Walla Walla, also known as the "Battle of Frenchtown" (December 7–10, 1855), the longest Indian battle in the history of Washington Territory, occurred near Lowden in 1855.

The Woodward Canyon Winery is a popular destination for locals and visitors in Lowden.
