= North Fork Touchet River =

- Location of the mouth of the North Fork in Washington

Location
- Country: United States
- State: Washington
- County: Columbia

Physical characteristics
- Source: Near Ski Bluewood
  - location: Blue Mountains
  - coordinates: 46°04′29″N 117°50′08″W
  - elevation: 5,500 ft (1,700 m)
- Mouth: Touchet River
  - location: South of Dayton
  - coordinates: 46°18′04″N 117°57′31″W
  - elevation: 1,667 ft (508 m)
- Length: 21.7 mi (34.9 km)
- Basin size: 101.7 mi^{2} (263 km^{2})

The North Fork Touchet River is the primary headwater of the Touchet River, flowing 21.7 miles (34.9 km) through Columbia County, Washington. The river begins in the Blue Mountains in a ravine just east of Ski Bluewood. It flows north, past the Touchet Corral Sno-Park, in a narrow valley between Chase Mountain to the west and Middle Point Ridge to the east. It is joined by Spangler, Lewis and Jim Creeks from the right before receiving the Wolf Fork from the left. An unnamed tributary from the right forms Hompegg Falls just downstream of Spangler Creek. Below the Wolf Fork it flows northwest through a wider valley before joining the South Fork Touchet River at Baileysburg, south of Dayton, to form the main stem of the Touchet.

== See also ==
- List of rivers of Washington
