= Wolf Fork (Touchet River tributary) =

- Location of the mouth of the Wolf Fork in Washington

Location
- Country: United States
- State: Washington
- County: Columbia

Physical characteristics
- Source: Blue Mountains
  - location: Umatilla National Forest
  - coordinates: 46°04′48″N 117°53′55″W
  - elevation: 5,520 ft (1,680 m)
- Mouth: North Fork Touchet River
  - location: South of Dayton
  - coordinates: 46°16′27″N 117°53′45″W
  - elevation: 1,903 ft (580 m)
- Length: 16.1 mi (25.9 km)
- Basin size: 41.8 mi^{2} (108 km^{2})

The Wolf Fork is a 16.1-mile (25.9 km) long headwater stream of the Touchet River in Columbia County, Washington. Draining off the northern Blue Mountains from in between 5,682-foot (1,732 m) Griffin Peak and Ski Bluewood, it flows north through a narrow valley along the eastern side of Newby Mountain. At the small cabin community of Mountain Home Park, it is joined from the left by Robinson Fork. It continues north to join the North Fork Touchet River, which joins with the South Fork Touchet River another 5 miles (8.0 km) downstream to form the Touchet River near Dayton.

== See also ==
- List of rivers of Washington
