= Robinson Fork (Touchet River tributary) =

- Location of the mouth of the Robinson Fork in Washington

Location
- Country: United States
- State: Washington
- County: Columbia

Physical characteristics
- Source: Blue Mountains
  - location: Umatilla National Forest
  - coordinates: 46°05′17″N 117°54′16″W
  - elevation
- Mouth: Wolf Fork
  - location: South of Dayton
  - coordinates: 46°14′17″N 117°53′44″W
  - elevation: 2,139 ft (652 m)
- Length: 11.4 mi (18.3 km)
- Basin size: 41.8 mi^{2} (108 km^{2})

The Robinson Fork is a headwater stream of the Touchet River, about 11.4 miles (18.3 km) long, in Columbia County, Washington. Originating in the northern Blue Mountains near Griffin Peak, it flows north through a narrow valley in between Robinette Mountain (to the west) and Newby Mountain. It empties into the Wolf Fork at the small community of Mountain Home Park. The Wolf Fork joins the North Fork Touchet River, which in turn joins with the South Fork Touchet River near Dayton to form the main stem of the Touchet.

== See also ==
- List of rivers of Washington
