= 2020 Pacific Northwest floods =

Floods in the United States

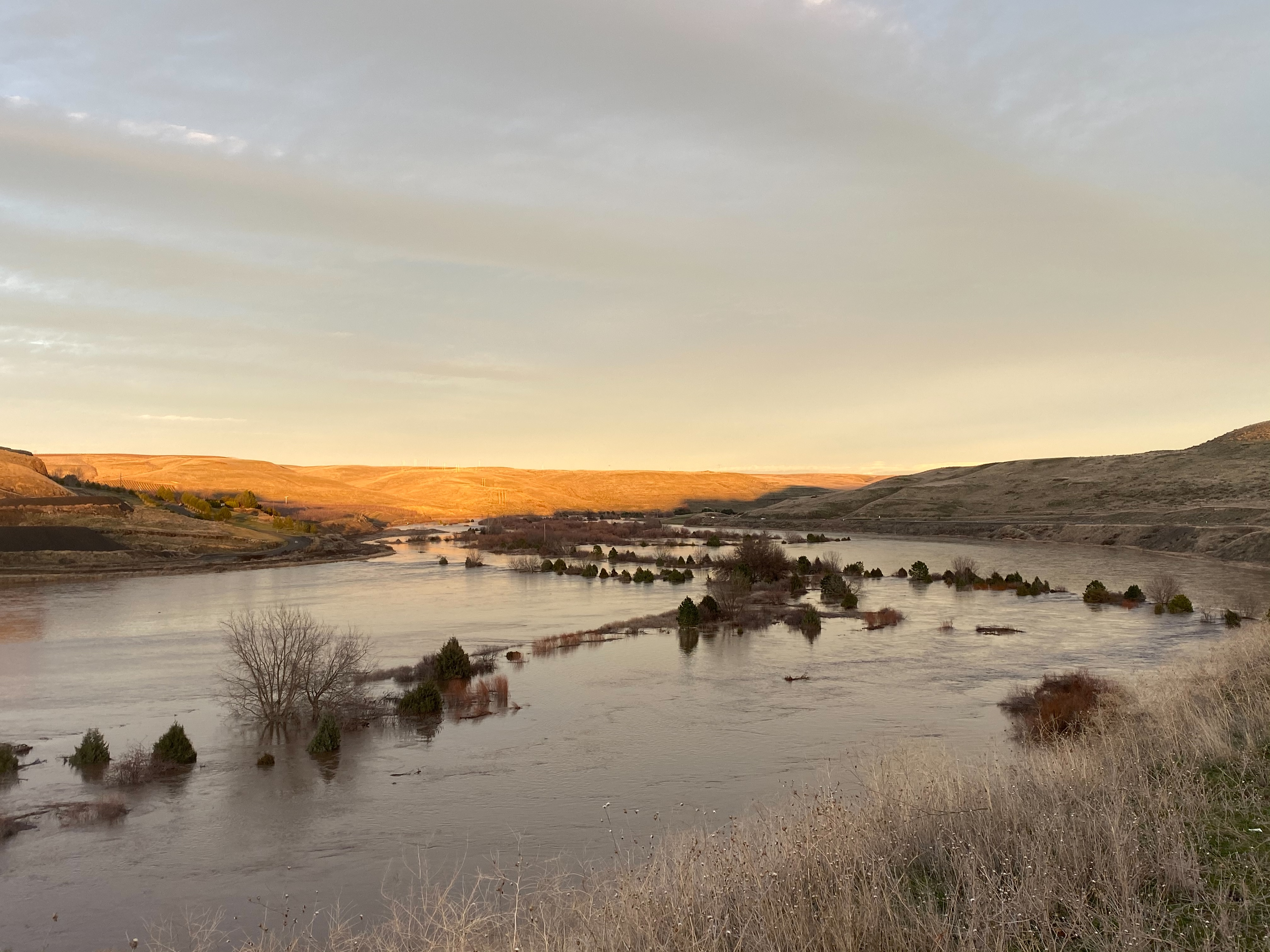
- Flooding on the Walla Walla River near Touchet, Washington.
- Date: February 2020
- Location: Washington and Oregon in the United States and southwest British Columbia, Canada
- Deaths: 1

The 2020 Pacific Northwest floods were a series of floods in the Pacific Northwest, United States. The main impacts were experienced in the northwest quarter of Washington and along rivers and streams draining the Blue Mountains in southeast Washington and northeast Oregon. Small portions of the Lower Mainland in British Columbia, Canada also flooded. The flooding was primarily caused by heavy rain falling on mountain snow and represents the worst flood on record for some of the affected rivers. Large rivers in the region, such as the Columbia and Snake were largely unaffected.

== Meteorological synopsis ==
In early February, an atmospheric river aimed at the Pacific Northwest, bringing heavy rain to low and mid-elevation locations in Washington and northern Oregon. Most atmospheric rivers that impact the Pacific Northwest are typically oriented from southwest to northeast, but this one was unusual in that it was oriented west to east. Because of the orientation of mountain ranges such as the Cascade Range, the west to east trajectory is more efficient at producing precipitation on the windward side of the ranges. This, combined with the duration of the rainfall on near-average snowpack, led to widespread flooding that was record breaking on some rivers.

Before the system impacted the region, the National Weather Service issued flood warnings for multiple rivers. In parts of the Washington Cascades, over 15 inches (380 mm) inches of water-equivalent precipitation was observed, with over 10 inches (250 mm) on the west slopes of the Blue Mountains.

== Flood and damage ==
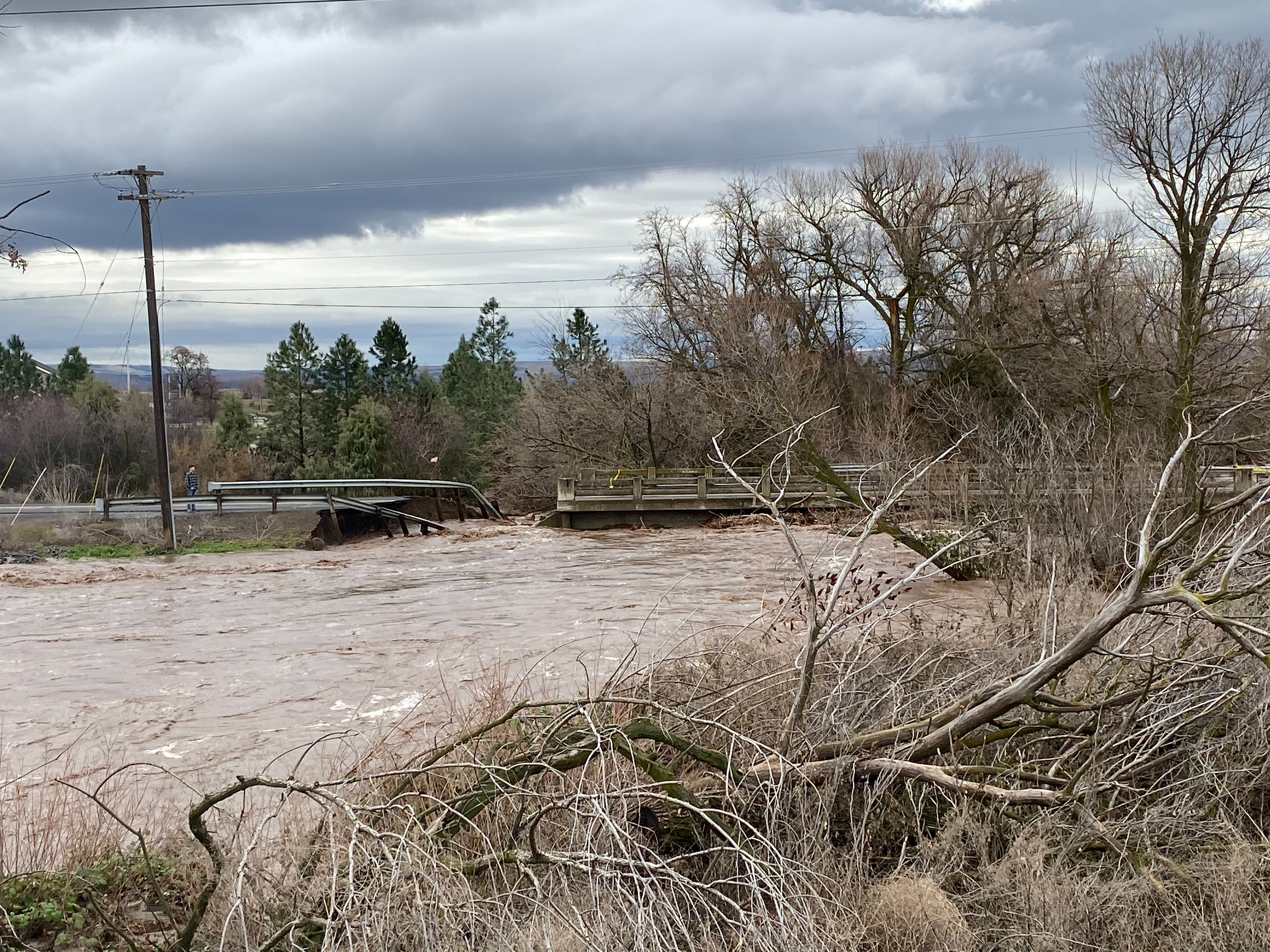
A bridge over Mill Creek west of College Place in Walla Walla County damaged by flooding.

=== Blue Mountain area ===
Water rose so fast on the Umatilla River that some Pendleton residents were unable to receive evacuation notices before being forced to flee the flooding. One family had to seek shelter on the roof of their home and water reached high enough to overtop levees in the downtown area of that city. The body of a Pendleton-area woman who is believed to have been attempting to evacuate was found a few days later. Downstream, the Umatilla River overran Interstate 84 leading to a 200 miles (320 km) stretch of the freeway being closed for several days. Around 50 homes in Echo took damage along with some homes and businesses near Stanfield. Riverfront Park west of Hermiston was under water for the second year in a row and homeless families living in makeshift camps nearby were displaced. A mudslide 26 miles (42 km) east of Pendleton caused a closure on a railroad owned by Union Pacific.

Flooding in the Walla Walla River watershed was also extensive. The largest city in the area, Walla Walla, was protected from flooding on Mill Creek which was placed in a deep channel through the city following flooding in 1931. On either side of the city, the creek overflowed its banks to wash out roads, inundate fields, and damage buildings. In an effort to manage flows in the creek the Army Corps of Engineers released water from Bennington Lake, a reservoir east of Walla Walla, into nearby Russell Creek. The reservoir was not at risk of being overtopped, but it took about 40 days to get it back to normal levels.

Much of Milton-Freewater was evacuated when the Walla Walla River overtopped a levee protecting that city. Upstream, the river and some of its tributaries rendered some roads in and near the Blue Mountains impassable. US 12 was closed between Wallula and Touchet because of flooding from the Walla Walla River, as well as between Prescott and Dayton where the Touchet River flowed out of its banks and damaged the levee system.

Many rivers and streams that drain the Blue Mountains eclipsed records that were set during the 1996 Pacific Northwest floods with other spots falling just short of that benchmark. By contrast, rivers draining the east slopes of the Cascades, such as the Yakima only experienced minor flooding because of the orientation of the 2020 atmospheric river and lack of snow on the valley floor.

=== Northwest Washington and Lower Mainland ===
Many rivers draining the west slopes of the Cascades north of Interstate 90 flooded. In the north, the Sumas River overtopped levees to inundate the city of Sumas, forcing the closure of State Route 9 and the border crossing it terminates at, connecting that city with Abbotsford, British Columbia. Sumas residents were asked by authorities to delay pumping water from their homes because of high water in parts of town. North of the border, some fields were flooded and Fraser Health issued a notice to calm concerns about naturally occurring asbestos in Sumas River sediment.

Major flooding on the Snohomish River did not reach high enough to impact businesses in Snohomish, but many roads near town were covered by water. As water receded on the Skagit River, it was discovered that a levee protecting Burlington had taken damage and would need to be stabilized. Strong winds in that area also caused many to lose power. By controlling flow through the Howard Hanson Dam, the Army Corps of Engineers kept the Green River from flooding the Seattle suburb of Kent.

== Response ==
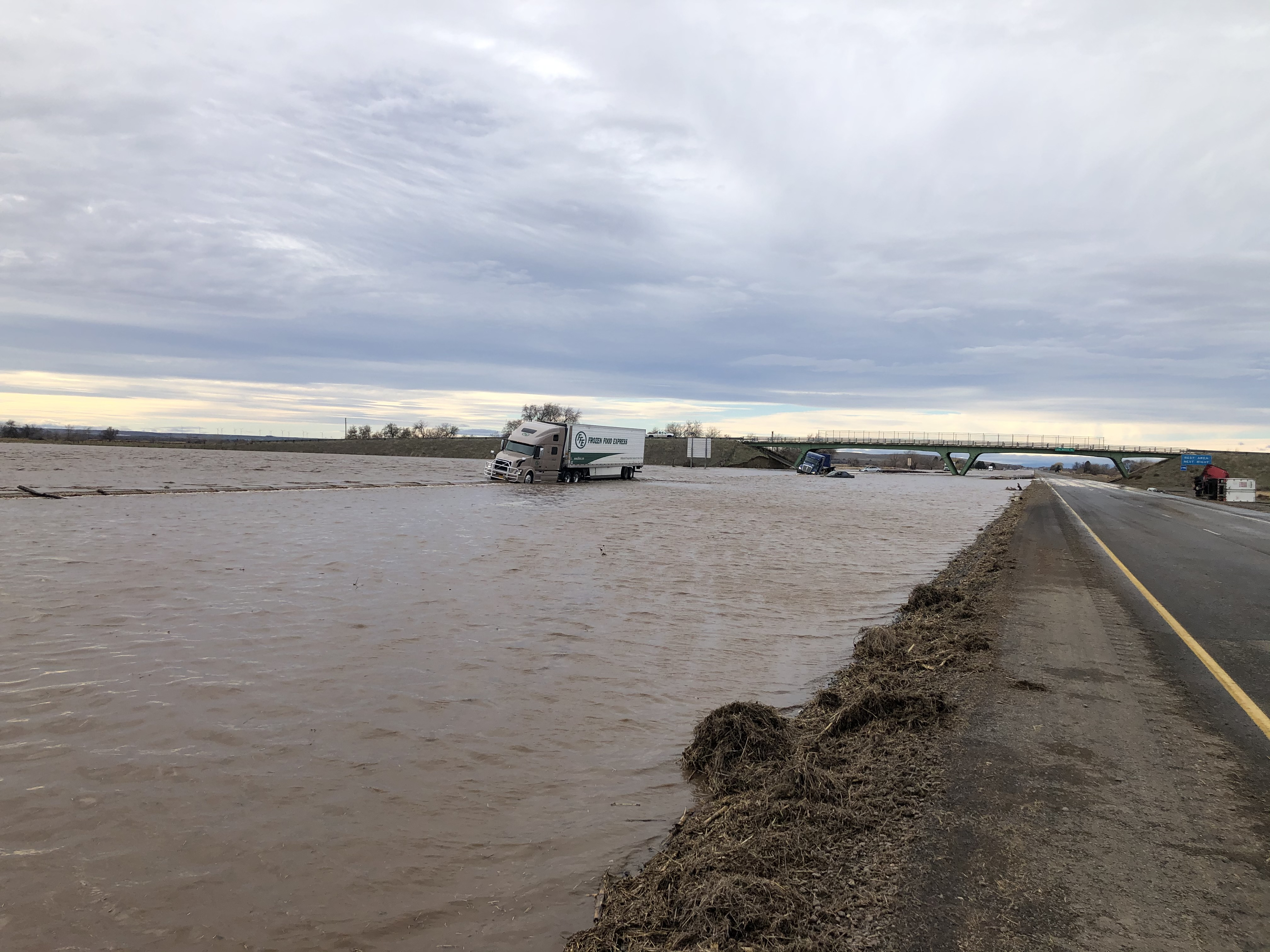
Vehicles stuck in floodwater on Interstate 84 near Echo, Oregon.

Washington governor Jay Inslee proclaimed a state of emergency for 20 counties throughout the state while Oregon governor Kate Brown did the same for Umatilla, Union, and Wallowa Counties. It was noted that the cost of road repairs in Washington alone was expected to reach $3 million. The Oregon Army National Guard was mobilized to rescue residents who were stuck on the slopes of the Blue Mountains above Milton-Freewater due to washed out roads, warning those who stayed behind that it may be several weeks before they would be able to get out otherwise.

After a bridge across Mill Creek washed out southeast of Walla Walla, the volunteer fire department attempted to rescue residents using a converted military vehicle. This got stuck and extra equipment had to be called in to get it out. As a precautionary measure the city of Walla Walla closed some bridges across Mill Creek, but the artificial channel did not overflow and the bridges reopened once the water level dropped.

Among the numerous roads that were damaged by flooding was Interstate 84, the only east–west Interstate in Oregon. Near Echo, the Umatilla River completely covered the road, forcing the Oregon Department of Transportation (ODOT) to close it for a time with some motorists abandoning their vehicles on the road. Once the waters receded, ODOT opened one lane each direction with a lowered speed limit, but full repairs took some time to complete. Six other state highways were closed in northeast Oregon, and it is estimated that the cost of damage in that region was $48 million.
