= Hompegg Falls =

Waterfall in Washington state, U.S.

- Interactive map of Hompegg Falls
- Location: Columbia County, Washington
- Coordinates: 46.16492°N 117.81093°W
- Watercourse: Unnamed

Hompegg Falls is a waterfall that flows from a creek just as it empties in the north fork of Touchet River, located in the U.S. state of Washington. The waterfall is in the heart of the Umatilla National Forest, just 2 miles south of the Huckleberry Mountain Reservoir Dam and Lewis Creek and 8 miles north of Ski Bluewood. The name of the waterfall is from the initials of seven individuals who discovered the waterfall while hiking the forest in the 1930s.

Access to Hompegg Falls is 15 miles south of the city of Dayton through Hompegg Falls Drive off N Touchet Rd, at a point where an unnamed creek flows into the North Folk Touchet River.

== Fauna ==
The lowland fir, western larch and Douglas fir forests at the higher ridges of the canyon as well as the serviceberry bush and buckbush area in the low slopes that surround Hompegg Falls are abundant in Siskiyou chipmunk, golden-mantled ground squirrel, Columbian ground squirrel, flickertails, Snowshoe rabbits, Gapper's red-backed voles, northern water shrews, and Dobson's shrews. Townsend's Warbler, Dippers, rock wrens, and winter wrens, and other birds have also been documented in Hompegg Falls and its vicinity.

== Floods ==
Frequent floods may have obliterated most of the cliffs where Hompegg Falls is located. For example, during a flood in February 1996, the flowing waters were recorded to have a width/depth ratio of 38.2 at Hompegg Falls. Tributary streams and the North Fork Touchet above Hompegg Falls appear to have withstood the flood better than reaches downstream.

== See also ==
- List of waterfalls in Washington
