= Covello =

Covello may refer to:

- Covello, Washington
- Aldo Covello, Italian engineer
- Alfred V. Covello (1933–2025), American judge
- Leonard Covello (1887–1982), Italian-born American educator
