= Patit Creek =

- Location of the mouth of Patit Creek in Washington

Location
- Country: United States
- State: Washington
- County: Columbia

Physical characteristics
- Source: Confluence of North and West Forks
  - location: Blue Mountains
  - coordinates: 46°20′07″N 117°51′25″W
- Mouth: Touchet River
  - location: Dayton
  - coordinates: 46°19′11″N 117°59′05″W
  - elevation: 1,601 ft (488 m)
- Length: 7.8 mi (12.6 km)
- Basin size: 65.9 mi^{2} (171 km^{2})

Patit Creek is a tributary of the Touchet River in Columbia County, Washington in the United States. It originates as two forks, North Patit and West Patit Creeks, on Maloney Mountain in the northern Blue Mountains near Camp Wooten. Both forks flow north before turning west, joining 7.8 miles (12.6 km) east of Dayton to form Patit Creek. The main stem flows west through a valley in the foothills and through Dayton, emptying into the Touchet River just west of downtown.

Lewis and Clark camped on Patit Creek during their return from the Pacific coast on May 2, 1806. The site is commemorated with a series of metal sculptures representing the members of the expedition and their animals. The creek's name is derived from the Nez Perce Pat-tit-ta, meaning "bark creek".

The creek flows through a narrow, constricted channel in the northern part of Dayton and is considered a significant flooding hazard. It caused major damage in the floods of February 1996 and February 2020. The creek has spawning populations of wild steelhead trout, though intensive farming has degraded stream habitat, with the elimination of riparian vegetation, increased sediment runoff, and channel straightening for flood control.

== See also ==
- List of rivers of Washington
