= Triple Nickel =

Triple Nickel, Triple Nickels or Triple Nickles may refer to:

== Military ==
- 555th Engineer Brigade (United States), part of the U.S. Army's I Corps
- 555 Field Artillery Battalion, part of the U.S. Army's 5th Infantry Regiment during the Korean War
- 555th Fighter Squadron, part of the U.S. Air Force's 31st Fighter Wing
- 555th Mobile Infantry Regiment, a fictional elite military unit in John Ringo's Legacy of the Aldenata book series
- 555th Parachute Infantry Battalion (United States), aka "Triple Nickles", an all-black unit of the U.S. Army during World War II
- 53-0555, a retired Lockheed EC-121 Warning Star aircraft on display at the National Museum of the United States Air Force

== Other ==
- 555 timer IC, an integrated circuit popular with hobbyists
- Interstate 555, a highway in Arkansas, United States
- Ohio State Route 555, a highway in Ohio, United States
- Triple Nickel Books, published by Solomon Gelman
- Triple Nickel lift at Bluewood Ski Area
