= South Fork Touchet River =

- Location of the mouth of the South Fork in Washington

Location
- Country: United States
- State: Washington
- County: Columbia

Physical characteristics
- Source: Confluence of Burnt Fork and Green Fork
  - location: Blue Mountains
  - coordinates: 46°06′22″N 117°59′08″W
  - elevation: 3,009 ft (917 m)
- Mouth: Touchet River
  - location: South of Dayton
  - coordinates: 46°18′04″N 117°57′31″W
  - elevation: 1,667 ft (508 m)
- Length: 16.2 mi (26.1 km)
- Basin size: 43.6 mi^{2} (113 km^{2})

The South Fork Touchet River is a 16.2-mile (26.1 km) river in Columbia County, Washington, and a headwater of the Touchet River. It originates in the Umatilla National Forest in the northern Blue Mountains at the confluence of the Burnt Fork and Green Fork; a small portion of the Green Fork is in Walla Walla County. The Griffin Fork joins the South Fork about 2 miles (3.2 km) downstream of there. The South Fork flows due north through a narrow valley along the western side of Robinette Mountain. It joins the North Fork Touchet River near Baileysburg, just south of Dayton, to form the main stem of the Touchet River.

The Rainwater Wildlife Management Area is located in the upper South Fork and is operated by the Confederated Tribes of the Umatilla Indian Reservation. It was created from the Rainwater Ranch which was owned by the Rainwater family from the early 1900s to 1991, before being sold to timber companies which extensively logged the area. The tribes acquired the property in 1998. This stretch of the river has been subject to riparian restoration projects, including instream log placement and sediment retention structures, to mitigate the effects of logging and grazing on salmon and steelhead runs.

== See also ==
- List of rivers of Washington
