= Huntsville (disambiguation) =

Huntsville is a city in Alabama. It is also the name of several other places:

United States

- Huntsville, Arkansas
- Huntsville, Connecticut
- Huntsville, Illinois
- Huntsville Township, Schuyler County, Illinois
- Huntsville, Madison County, Indiana
- Huntsville, Randolph County, Indiana
- Huntsville, Kansas
- Huntsville, Mississippi
- Huntsville, Missouri
- Huntsville, North Carolina
- Huntsville, Ohio
- Huntsville, Tennessee
- Huntsville, Texas
- Huntsville, Utah
- Huntsville, Washington
- Huntsville, West Virginia

Canada

- Huntsville, Ontario

== Other uses ==
- Huntsville (Norwegian band), an experimental jazz trio
