= Frank Finkel =

United States Army soldier

Frank Finkel (January 29, 1854 – August 28, 1930) was an American who rose to prominence late in his life and after his death for his claims to being the only white survivor of George Armstrong Custer's battalion at the Battle of the Little Bighorn on June 25, 1876. Historians disagree over whether Finkel's claim is accurate; although he provided several details that would have been known by someone who was at Little Bighorn, there are inconsistencies in his accounts of events.

Finkel was born in Ohio to German immigrant parents in 1854. He and others claimed that he enlisted in the United States Army in the early 1870s and served under George Custer during the Great Sioux War of 1876. During the Battle of the Little Bighorn, Finkel claims he was wounded early in the fighting and his horse bolted from the battle. After being nursed back to health, he traveled to St. Louis, then settled in Columbia County, Washington. Over the next 40 years, he amassed a significant estate as a farmer in the town of Dayton and came to be regarded as one of Dayton's "pioneers". Sometime around 1920, he began telling companions that he survived the Battle of the Little Bighorn, and for the next several years recounted his alleged experiences in the battle.

Historians who support Finkel's claim argue that several details in Finkel's account could only be known by someone who was at Little Bighorn, including details of events in the battle that were not widely known until after Finkel's death, and the location and quantity of streams of potable water in the area. Those who disagree with Finkel's claim argue that records at the time do not indicate the existence of any "Frank Finkel" and that the United States Army knows the fate of all the people who have been suggested as possible false names for Finkel.

== Early life ==
Frank Finkel is believed to have been born in Marietta, Ohio to Peter and Magdalena Finkel. His father was a German immigrant who owned a farm with six sons and a daughter. His family spoke German at home, and Peter sent his children to public schools. Frank Finkel grew up bilingual and fully literate. Peter Finkel died in 1868.

== Battle of the Little Bighorn claims ==
Accounts of Frank Finkel's enlistment in the United States Army vary. John Koster, author of the book Custer Survivor and a supporter of the Finkel claim, argues that he enlisted under the name "August Finckle" in Chicago in January 1872. August Finckle's reported place of birth was Berlin, Prussia, which Koster argues was Finkel's attempt to use his actual German heritage to capitalize on the Prussian military's popularity in the United States at the time. Koster also uncovered a document revealing that Finkel's widow believed he enlisted in September 1874 in Iowa, under the alias "Frank Hall". At the time of the Battle of the Little Bighorn he was second sergeant of C Company of the 7th Cavalry under the command of Tom Custer.

Finkel claimed that early in the battle, both he and his horse were shot, and the horse bolted from the battle site with Finkel still riding. After riding for several days, Finkel left his already dying horse and continued on foot. He came upon a white man cutting wood outside a cabin; the man initially demanded Finkel leave at gunpoint but when Finkel fell unconscious in front of him, he took him into his cabin. The man, known to Finkel only as "Bill", helped treat his wounds; Finkel remained with him for several months, then departed for Fort Benton, where he learned of the deaths of Custer and all of his men. He claims that he reported to an Army officer to request a discharge but gave up on the matter when the officer required him to provide two witnesses to vouch for his identity.

== Later life ==
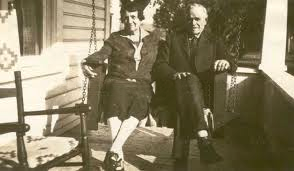
Finkle and wife.

Finkel traveled to St. Louis, Missouri, where he worked in the dairy industry. He returned west in 1878, and settled in Dayton, Washington. He married his first wife, Delia (also spelled "Delila") Rainwater, in 1886; soon after their marriage, Finkel began acquiring farmland and by 1911 he owned a significant amount of real estate in Dayton. Frank and Delia had three children who survived to adulthood, including one, Ben, who served in the Idaho Legislature. A 1906 newspaper article characterized Frank Finkel as someone who "enjoys the respect and confidence of all the good people in the community."

Finkel is not believed to have said anything about the Battle of the Little Bighorn over the course of 40 years living in Dayton. He is believed to have first made his claim of surviving the battle in 1920 after hearing his companions discussing what he believed to be erroneous details about Custer and the battle. Over the next several years, Finkel expanded on his claims in local speaking engagements, and in 1921 he gave an account to a reporter from the Walla Walla Bulletin, the largest newspaper in the area at the time.

Delia Finkel died in August 1921, shortly after the Walla Walla Bulletin article was published, and in 1926 Frank married his second wife, Hermie. For the remainder of Finkel's life, Hermie did even more research to try to confirm Finkel's story. At one point, Hermie found an account of a Lakota warrior who claimed that he saw a soldier ride off from the battle, mounted on a white horse. When she asked Finkel if this was him, Finkel said it was not and that his horse was roan-colored. Supporters of Finkel's story claim that if Finkel had been lying, he would have used this account to prove his story. Frank Finkel died at age 76 on August 28, 1930. In 2013, a photograph described as "August Finckle" was published first in the Battlefield Dispatch, a membership-circulation publication for Custer enthusiasts and then in the December 2013 issue of Wild West, a professionally edited general-circulation magazine of the Weider History Group. The photograph, described as "Sergeant August Finckle" of the Seventh Cavalry in an 1874 cavalry blouse, was widely identified as a photograph of Frank Finkel of Ohio taken 10 years before the familiar Frank Finkel portrait photograph taken around 1886. The hair color and hairline differed due to age, but every facial feature was identical, as were several mannerisms, including the shirt collar flipped up on the right side inside the coat collar, according to Mike Roncallo, a portrait photographer with New Jersey Press credentials, Sylvia Groen, a portrait painter, Police Chief Benjamin Fox of Wyckoff, NJ, and Jacques Harlow, a professional engineer with a degree from Dartmouth and a Fulbright Scholar with ID training from New York University. The owner of the photograph was a friend of Frank Finckle and mentions in the same Dispatch article burying Finckle . Four men claimed to identify Finckle and his horse, both dead on Finley Finckle Ridge. They do not name parts of battlefields for missing soldiers.

Conversely, Finckle's friend Charles Windolph rode down from Reno Hill expressly to find Finckle's body and give him a decent burial but could not find the body. "I tried to find the body of my German friend, Trooper Finkle, the tallest man in the regiment, But I could not identify him," Windolph, a Medal of Honor recipient and the last living soldier survivor of the battle, said in I Fought With Custer. Windolph's daughter told Dr. Arthur Kannenberg "After the battle Daddy says he looked everywhere for him as he was like a brother to him -- but the bodies were so disfigured that he was unable to find him." Dr. Kannenberg showed Windolph a photograph of Frank Finkel as a man of 66 but Windolph, who was almost blind by that time, could not say whether the photograph resembled Sergeant August Finckle or not. None of the people who claimed to have buried Finckle ever gave a detailed description of how they might have recognized his body. The final report by Sergeant Daniel Kanipe was described as full of inaccuracies by Col. W.A. Graham in The Custer Myth. Kanipe also described 60, 70, or 75 dead Indians when the Indians reported losing only 26 warriors and listed them by name. Kanipe said Lt. Col. Custer was shot once when every other witness said Custer was shot twice. Kanipe failed to identify his own company commander, Tom Custer, who had been beaten to a pulp. Kanipe apparently identified the body to Lt. Edward Godfrey, who did not appear to know Finckle by sight. Sergeant Samuel Alcott was not present at the actual battle and describes the burial he attended as taking place on a "barren plain" when it was actually on a hillside. The article in Battlefield Dispatch also stated that native-born German speakers reported having trouble understanding "Sergeant Finckle's" German pronunciation. Author Koster said that this was because Frank Finkel grew up in Ohio, had never lived in Germany, and had learned the Alemannic Bavarian dialect from his immigrant parents.
