= Ayer, Washington =

Unincorporated community in Washington, US

- Unincorporated community
- Location within Washington (state) Location within the United States
- Coordinates: 46°35′47″N 118°20′54″W
- Country: United States
- State: Washington
- County: Walla Walla
- Elevation: 581 ft (177 m)
- Time zone: UTC-8 (Pacific (PST))
  - Summer (DST): UTC-7 (PDT)
- GNIS feature ID: 1510760

Ayer is an unincorporated community located in Walla Walla County, Washington, United States.

Ayer is a stop on the Union Pacific Railroad located in the northern portion of the county, approximately 47 miles (76 km) north of Walla Walla along the Snake River. It was a main half way stop for the railroad between Hermiston, Oregon and Spokane, Washington. A hotel was built specifically for the train crews. It was also used by the Camas Prairie Railroad, from Lewiston, Idaho, and the Pomeroy Branch would use as a switching point for freight moving to the north or south. The small town grew up around the hotel and rail yard, but the original Ayer was relocated when Lower Monumental Dam was constructed by the U.S. Army Corps of Engineers, and the original area was flooded. The town is now abandoned and sits in a decaying state.
