= Turner, Washington =

Former community in Columbia County, Washington

- Unincorporated community
- Location within Washington (state) Location within the United States
- Coordinates: 46°24′45″N 117°51′17″W
- Country: United States
- State: Washington
- County: Columbia
- Elevation: 2,182 ft (665 m)
- Time zone: UTC-8 (Pacific (PST))
  - Summer (DST): UTC-7 (PDT)
- GNIS feature ID: 1509127

Turner is an unincorporated community in Columbia County, in the U.S. state of Washington.

== History ==
Turner was platted in 1902 by B. M. Turner, and named for him. A post office called Turner was established in 1904, and remained in operation until 1934.
