= Marengo, Columbia County, Washington =

Unincorporated community in Columbia County, Washington

Marengo, Washington
- Unincorporated community
- Location within Washington (state) Location within the United States
- Coordinates: 46°26′30″N 117°45′02″W
- Country: United States
- State: Washington
- County: Columbia
- Elevation: 1,483 ft (452 m)
- Time zone: UTC-8 (Pacific (PST))
  - Summer (DST): UTC-7 (PDT)
- GNIS feature ID: 1511123

Marengo is a planned, never constructed town in Columbia County, in the U.S. state of Washington. The community was named after Louis "Marengo" Raboin, an early settler. It was proposed as a choice for county seat, but did not win the vote.
