= Jackson, Washington =

Unincorporated community in Columbia County, Washington

- Unincorporated community
- Location within Washington (state) Location within the United States
- Coordinates: 46°32′04″N 117°54′47″W
- Country: United States
- State: Washington
- County: Columbia
- Elevation: 1,063 ft (324 m)
- Time zone: UTC-8 (Pacific (PST))
  - Summer (DST): UTC-7 (PDT)
- GNIS feature ID: 1511055

Jackson is an unincorporated community in Columbia County, in the U.S. state of Washington. The community bears the name of an early settler.
