= Walla Walla East, Washington =

- CDP
- Location of Walla Walla East, Washington
- Coordinates: 46°02′45″N 118°18′12″W
- Country: United States
- State: Washington
- County: Walla Walla

Area
  - Total: 1.7 sq mi (4.4 km^{2})
  - Land: 1.7 sq mi (4.4 km^{2})
  - Water: 0.039 sq mi (0.1 km^{2})
- Elevation: 1,011 ft (308 m)

Population (2020)
  - Total: 2,286
  - Density: 1,300/sq mi (520/km^{2})
- Time zone: UTC-8 (Pacific (PST))
  - Summer (DST): UTC-7 (PDT)
- ZIP code: 99362
- Area code: 509
- FIPS code: 53-75810
- GNIS feature ID: 2409522

Walla Walla East (/ˌwɑːlə ˈwɑːlə/ WAH-lə WAH-lə) is a census-designated place (CDP) in Walla Walla County, Washington, United States. As of the 2020 census, Walla Walla East had a population of 2,286.

== Geography ==
According to the United States Census Bureau, the CDP has a total area of 1.7 square miles (4.4 km^{2}), of which, 1.7 square miles (4.4 km^{2}) of it is land and 0.04 square miles (0.10 km^{2}) of it (1.18%) is water.

== Demographics ==
Historical population
Census	Pop.	Note	%±
1960	1,557		—
1980	3,285		—
1990	2,959		−9.9%
2000	2,479		−16.2%
2010	1,672		−32.6%
2020	2,286		36.7%
U.S. Decennial Census; 1960 1970 1980 1990; 2000 2010

Walla Walla East first appeared as an unincorporated community in the 1960 U.S. census; and as a census designated place in the 1980 U.S. census.

=== 2000 census ===
As of the census of 2000, there were 2,479 people, 947 households, and 725 families residing in the CDP. The population density was 1,474.2 people per square mile (569.2 people/km^{2}). There were 987 housing units at an average density of 586.9 units per square mile (226.6 units/km^{2}). The racial makeup of the CDP was 92.54% White, 0.28% African American, 0.85% Native American, 0.65% Asian, 0.12% Pacific Islander, 3.03% from other races, and 2.54% from two or more races. Hispanic or Latino of any race were 6.29% of the population.

There were 947 households, out of which 32.7% had children under the age of 18 living with them, 66.8% were married couples living together, 6.9% had a female householder with no husband present, and 23.4% were non-families. 19.4% of all households were made up of individuals, and 10.3% had someone living alone who was 65 years of age or older. The average household size was 2.58 and the average family size was 2.95.

In the CDP, the age distribution of the population shows 24.4% under the age of 18, 5.9% from 18 to 24, 25.3% from 25 to 44, 26.6% from 45 to 64, and 17.8% who were 65 years of age or older. The median age was 42 years. For every 100 females, there were 98.0 males. For every 100 females age 18 and over, there were 93.7 males.

The median income for a household in the CDP was $49,844, and the median income for a family was $54,107. Males had a median income of $37,462 versus $25,592 for females. The per capita income for the CDP was $22,709. About 4.6% of families and 8.1% of the population were below the poverty line, including 6.7% of those under age 18 and 2.6% of those age 65 or over.

== Education ==
The unincorporated areas east of Walla Walla are served with the boundaries of the Walla Walla Public Schools district.
