= Garrett, Washington =

- CDP
- Location of Garrett, Washington
- Coordinates: 46°03′38″N 118°23′16″W
- Country: United States
- State: Washington
- County: Walla Walla

Area
  - Total: 2.1 sq mi (5.5 km^{2})
  - Land: 2.1 sq mi (5.5 km^{2})
  - Water: 0 sq mi (0.0 km^{2})
- Elevation: 781 ft (238 m)

Population (2020)
  - Total: 1,771
  - Density: 830/sq mi (320/km^{2})
- Time zone: UTC-8 (Pacific (PST))
  - Summer (DST): UTC-7 (PDT)
- FIPS code: 53-26245
- GNIS feature ID: 2408284

Garrett is a census-designated place (CDP) in Walla Walla County, Washington, United States. As of the 2020 census, Garrett had a population of 1,771.

== Geography ==
According to the United States Census Bureau, the CDP has a total area of 2.1 square miles (5.4 km^{2}), all of it land.

=== Climate ===
According to the Köppen Climate Classification system, Apple Valley has a semi-arid climate, abbreviated "BSk" on climate maps.

== Demographics ==
Historical population
Census	Pop.	Note	%±
1960	1,641		—
1970	1,586		−3.4%
1980	1,134		−28.5%
1990	1,044		−7.9%
2000	1,022		−2.1%
2010	1,419		38.8%
2020	1,771		24.8%
U.S. Decennial Census; 1970 1980 1990; 2000 2010

=== 2020 census ===
As of the 2020 census, Garrett had a population of 1,771. The median age was 48.2 years. 19.9% of residents were under the age of 18 and 22.8% of residents were 65 years of age or older. For every 100 females there were 96.6 males, and for every 100 females age 18 and over there were 94.9 males age 18 and over.

87.7% of residents lived in urban areas, while 12.3% lived in rural areas.

There were 688 households in Garrett, of which 27.2% had children under the age of 18 living in them. Of all households, 66.4% were married-couple households, 14.0% were households with a male householder and no spouse or partner present, and 16.1% were households with a female householder and no spouse or partner present. About 15.8% of all households were made up of individuals and 7.5% had someone living alone who was 65 years of age or older.

There were 738 housing units, of which 6.8% were vacant. The homeowner vacancy rate was 2.3% and the rental vacancy rate was 6.2%.

Racial composition as of the 2020 census
Race	Number	Percent
White	1,488	84.0%
Black or African American	10	0.6%
American Indian and Alaska Native	8	0.5%
Asian	14	0.8%
Native Hawaiian and Other Pacific Islander	3	0.2%
Some other race	56	3.2%
Two or more races	192	10.8%
Hispanic or Latino (of any race)	241	13.6%

=== 2000 census ===
As of the census of 2000, there were 1,022 people, 407 households, and 291 families residing in the CDP. The population density was 482.4 people per square mile (186.3 people/km^{2}). There were 419 housing units at an average density of 197.8 units per square mile (76.4 units/km^{2}). The racial makeup of the CDP was 92.56% White, 0.20% Native American, 1.17% Asian, 4.50% from other races, and 1.57% from two or more races. Hispanic or Latino of any race were 5.38% of the population.

There were 407 households, out of which 31.2% had children under the age of 18 living with them, 62.9% were married couples living together, 6.1% had a female householder with no husband present, and 28.5% were non-families. 24.8% of all households were made up of individuals, and 12.0% had someone living alone who was 65 years of age or older. The average household size was 2.51 and the average family size was 2.98.

In the CDP, the age distribution of the population shows 25.0% under the age of 18, 4.9% from 18 to 24, 24.6% from 25 to 44, 26.8% from 45 to 64, and 18.8% who were 65 years of age or older. The median age was 43 years. For every 100 females, there were 95.8 males. For every 100 females age 18 and over, there were 93.2 males.

The median income for a household in the CDP was $38,750, and the median income for a family was $48,203. Males had a median income of $38,854 versus $24,643 for females. The per capita income for the CDP was $18,895. About 3.3% of families and 8.0% of the population were below the poverty line, including 10.1% of those under age 18 and 5.4% of those age 65 or over.
