= Clyde, Washington =

- Unincorporated community
- Location within Washington (state) Location within the United States
- Country: United States
- State: Washington
- County: Walla Walla
- Time zone: UTC-8 (Pacific (PST))
  - Summer (DST): UTC-7 (PDT)
- GNIS feature ID: 1510884

Clyde is an unincorporated community in Walla Walla County, in the U.S. state of Washington.

== History ==
A post office called Clyde was established in 1891, and remained in operation until 1934.
