= Aldo Covello =

Physicist

Aldo Covello is an Italian physicist from the University of Naples Federico II. He was awarded the status of Fellow in the American Physical Society, after he was nominated by their Forum on International Physics in 2012, for perfecting the theory of pairing correlations, for showing that the nucleon-nucleon potential lead to predictions for nuclei far from stability, and for his outstanding contributions to the international nuclear physics community by providing, for over two decades, a venue for theorists and experimentalists to share their latest ideas.

== See also ==
- List of fellows of the American Physical Society (2011–present)
