= Walla Walla County, Washington =

County in Washington, United States

- County
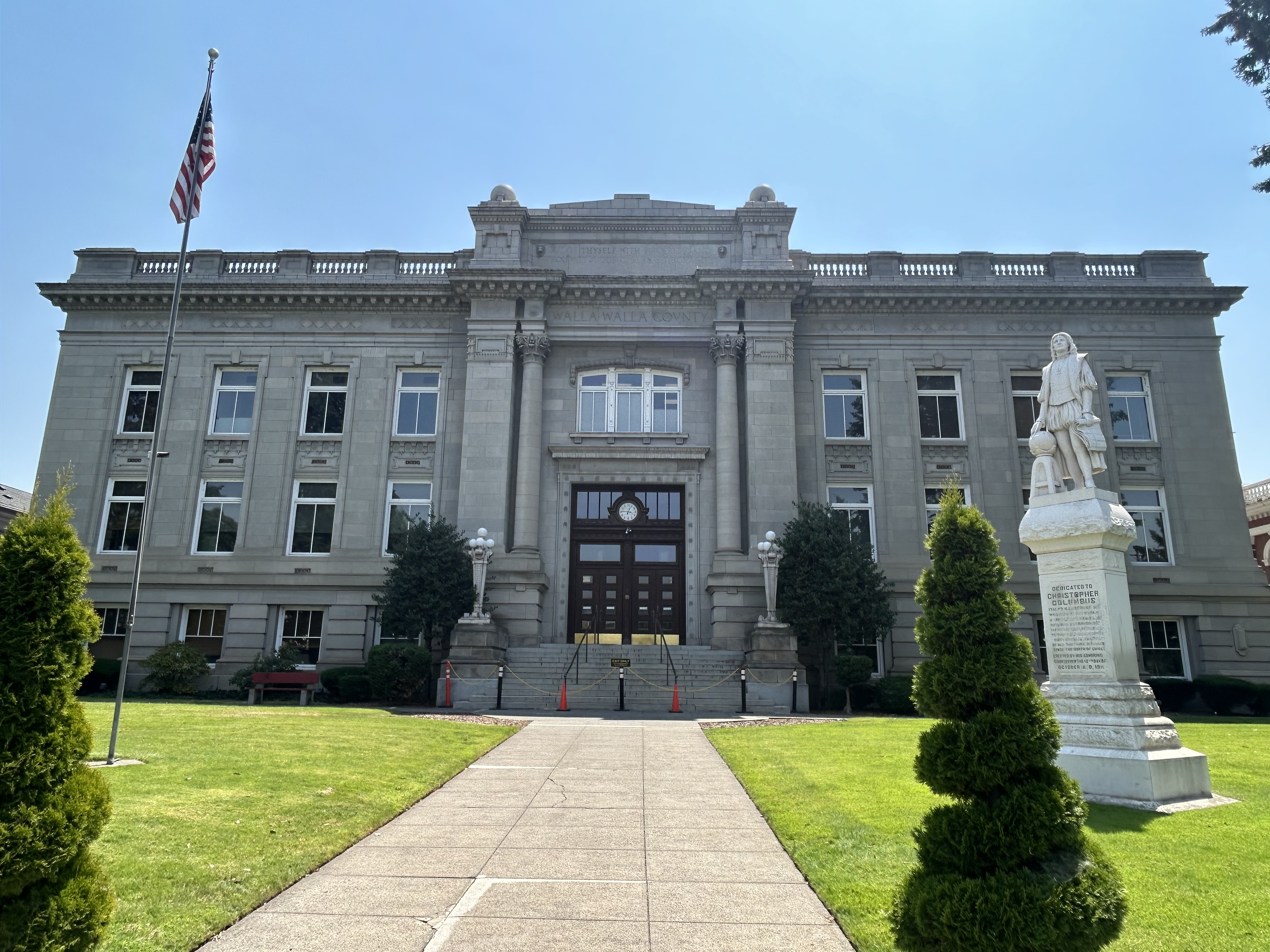
- Walla Walla County Courthouse in 2024

- Seal

- Location within the U.S. state of Washington
- Coordinates: 46°14′N 118°29′W
- Country: United States
- State: Washington
- Founded: April 25, 1854
- Named for: Walla Walla people
- Seat: Walla Walla
- Largest city: Walla Walla

Area
  - Total: 1,299 sq mi (3,360 km^{2})
  - Land: 1,270 sq mi (3,300 km^{2})
  - Water: 29 sq mi (75 km^{2}) 2.2%

Population (2020)
  - Total: 62,584
  - Estimate (2025): 62,361 ▼
  - Density: 46/sq mi (17.8/km^{2})
- Time zone: UTC−8 (Pacific)
  - Summer (DST): UTC−7 (PDT)
- Congressional district: 5th
- Website: www.wwcowa.gov

Walla Walla County (/ˌwɑːlə ˈwɑːlə/ WAH-lə WAH-lə) is a county located in the southeast of the U.S. state of Washington. As of the 2020 census, its population was 62,584. The county seat and most populous city is Walla Walla. The county was formed on April 25, 1854 and is named after the Walla Walla tribe of Native Americans.

Walla Walla County is included in the Walla Walla, WA Metropolitan Statistical Area. As of 2020, the Walla Walla MSA is the third smallest metropolitan area in the United States, after the Carson City, Nevada MSA and Eagle Pass, Texas MSA.

== Geography ==
According to the United States Census Bureau, the county has a total area of 1,299 square miles (3,360 km^{2}), of which 29 square miles (75 km^{2}) (2.2%) are covered by water.

=== Geographic features ===
- Columbia River
- Snake River
- Blue Mountains
- Touchet River
- Ponderosa Pines
- Banana Belt
- Walla Walla River

=== Major highways ===
- U.S. Route 12
- U.S. Route 730

=== Adjacent counties ===
- Columbia County - east
- Umatilla County, Oregon - south
- Benton County - west
- Franklin County - northwest

=== National protected areas ===
- McNary National Wildlife Refuge
- Umatilla National Forest (part)
- Whitman Mission National Historic Site

== Demographics ==
Historical population
Census	Pop.	Note	%±
1860	1,318		—
1870	5,300		302.1%
1880	8,716		64.5%
1890	12,224		40.2%
1900	18,680		52.8%
1910	31,931		70.9%
1920	27,539		−13.8%
1930	28,441		3.3%
1940	30,547		7.4%
1950	40,135		31.4%
1960	42,195		5.1%
1970	42,176		0.0%
1980	47,435		12.5%
1990	48,439		2.1%
2000	55,180		13.9%
2010	58,781		6.5%
2020	62,584		6.5%
2025 (est.)	62,361	▼	−0.4%
U.S. Decennial Census; 1790–1960 1900–1990; 1990–2000 2010–2020

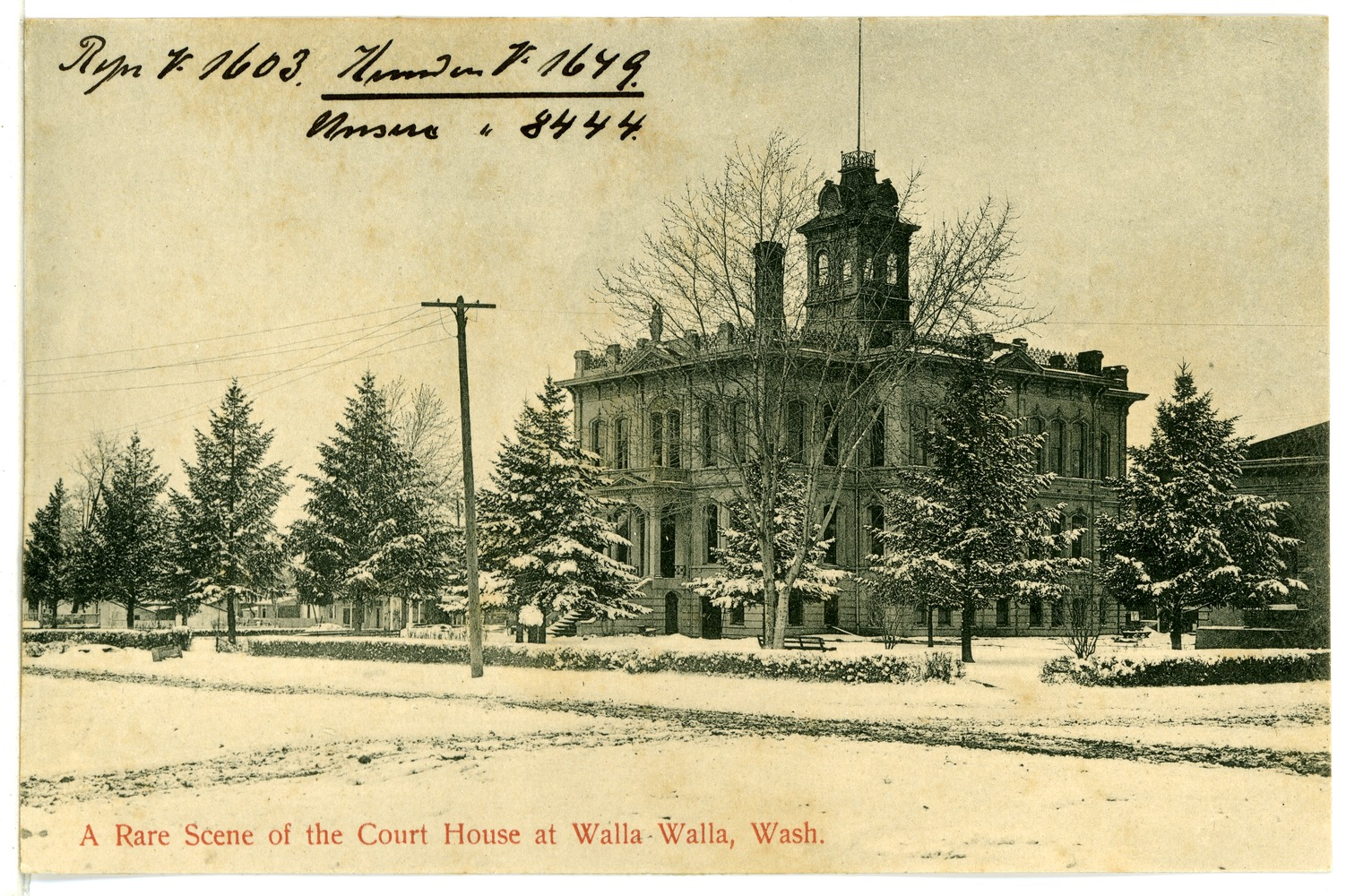
Postcard featuring the Walla Walla Court House in 1906

=== 2020 census ===
As of the 2020 census, the county had a population of 62,584. Of the residents, 20.8% were under the age of 18 and 19.9% were 65 years of age or older; the median age was 39.3 years. For every 100 females there were 104.0 males, and for every 100 females age 18 and over there were 103.8 males. 79.7% of residents lived in urban areas and 20.3% lived in rural areas.

Walla Walla County, Washington – Racial and ethnic composition Note: the US Census treats Hispanic/Latino as an ethnic category. This table excludes Latinos from the racial categories and assigns them to a separate category. Hispanics/Latinos may be of any race.
Race / Ethnicity (NH = Non-Hispanic)	Pop 2000	Pop 2010	Pop 2020	% 2000	% 2010	% 2020
White alone (NH)	43,502	43,604	42,580	78.84%	74.18%	68.04%
Black or African American alone (NH)	869	1,004	981	1.57%	1.71%	1.57%
Native American or Alaska Native alone (NH)	399	452	418	0.72%	0.77%	0.67%
Asian alone (NH)	600	733	918	1.09%	1.25%	1.47%
Pacific Islander alone (NH)	115	159	134	0.21%	0.27%	0.21%
Other race alone (NH)	104	54	280	0.19%	0.09%	0.45%
Mixed race or Multiracial (NH)	937	1,182	3,067	1.70%	2.01%	4.90%
Hispanic or Latino (any race)	8,654	11,593	14,206	15.68%	19.72%	22.70%
Total	55,180	58,781	62,584	100.00%	100.00%	100.00%

The racial makeup of the county was 72.7% White, 1.7% Black or African American, 1.1% American Indian and Alaska Native, 1.5% Asian, 0.2% Native Hawaiian and Pacific Islander, 11.3% from some other race, and 11.5% from two or more races. Hispanic or Latino residents of any race comprised 22.7% of the population.

There were 23,082 households in the county, of which 28.6% had children under the age of 18 living with them and 26.7% had a female householder with no spouse or partner present. About 28.9% of all households were made up of individuals and 13.6% had someone living alone who was 65 years of age or older.

There were 24,971 housing units, of which 7.6% were vacant. Among occupied housing units, 64.7% were owner-occupied and 35.3% were renter-occupied. The homeowner vacancy rate was 1.1% and the rental vacancy rate was 6.6%.

=== 2010 census ===
As of the 2010 census, there were 58,781 people, 21,719 households, and 14,132 families living in the county. The population density was 46.3 inhabitants per square mile (17.9/km^{2}). There were 23,451 housing units at an average density of 18.5 per square mile (7.1/km^{2}). The racial makeup of the county was 84.5% white, 1.8% black or African American, 1.3% Asian, 1.0% American Indian, 0.3% Pacific islander, 8.0% from other races, and 3.1% from two or more races. Those of Hispanic or Latino origin made up 19.7% of the population. In terms of ancestry, 23.5% were German, 13.3% were English and 12.7% were Irish.

Of the 21,719 households, 30.8% had children under the age of 18 living with them, 50.1% were married couples living together, 10.5% had a female householder with no husband present, 34.9% were non-families, and 28.2% of all households were made up of individuals. The average household size was 2.50 and the average family size was 3.05. The median age was 36.7 years.

The median income for a household in the county was $45,575 and the median income for a family was $55,773. Males had a median income of $42,704 versus $35,586 for females. The per capita income for the county was $23,027. About 12.4% of families and 17.5% of the population were below the poverty line, including 24.6% of those under age 18 and 9.2% of those age 65 or over.

=== 2000 census ===
As of the 2000 census, there were 55,180 people, 19,647 households, and 13,242 families living in the county. The population density was 43 people per square mile (17 people/km^{2}). There were 21,147 housing units at an average density of 17 per square mile (6.6/km^{2}). The racial makeup of the county was 85.3% White, 1.7% Black or African American, 0.8% Native American, 1.1% Asian, 0.2% Pacific Islander, 8.2% from other races, and 2.6% from two or more races. 15.7% of the population were Hispanic or Latino of any race. 20.1% were of German, 10.7% English, 7.7% United States or American and 7.3% Irish ancestry.

There were 19,647 households, out of which 32.10% had children under the age of 18 living with them, 54.00% were married couples living together, 9.50% had a female householder with no husband present, and 32.60% were non-families. 27.10% of all households were made up of individuals, and 12.40% had someone living alone who was 65 years of age or older. The average household size was 2.54 and the average family size was 3.08.

In the county, the population was spread out, with 24.60% under the age of 18, 13.40% from 18 to 24, 26.50% from 25 to 44, 20.80% from 45 to 64, and 14.80% who were 65 years of age or older. The median age was 35 years. For every 100 females there were 103.80 males. For every 100 females age 18 and over, there were 102.90 males.

The median income for a household in the county was $35,900, and the median income for a family was $44,962. Males had a median income of $34,691 versus $24,736 for females. The per capita income for the county was $16,509. About 10.20% of families and 15.10% of the population were below the poverty line, including 18.80% of those under age 18 and 8.20% of those age 65 or over.

== Communities ==
=== Cities ===
- College Place
- Prescott
- Waitsburg
- Walla Walla (county seat)

=== Census-designated places ===
- Burbank
- Dixie
- Garrett
- Touchet
- Walla Walla East
- Wallula

=== Unincorporated communities ===
- Ayer
- Clyde
- Eureka
- Lowden

=== Ghost towns ===
- Attalia
- Pleasant View

== Politics ==
United States presidential election results for Walla Walla County, Washington
Year	Republican		Democratic		Third party(ies)	
Year	No.	%	No.	%	No.	%
1892	1,362	47.14%	1,313	45.45%	214	7.41%
1896	1,596	47.63%	1,716	51.21%	39	1.16%
1900	2,119	57.44%	1,480	40.12%	90	2.44%
1904	2,824	71.99%	956	24.37%	143	3.65%
1908	2,843	60.73%	1,660	35.46%	178	3.80%
1912	1,937	25.28%	2,507	32.72%	3,219	42.01%
1916	4,429	48.00%	4,456	48.29%	342	3.71%
1920	5,957	67.60%	2,338	26.53%	517	5.87%
1924	5,465	58.83%	1,662	17.89%	2,163	23.28%
1928	6,774	70.08%	2,859	29.58%	33	0.34%
1932	4,653	44.00%	5,578	52.75%	344	3.25%
1936	4,584	39.28%	6,562	56.23%	524	4.49%
1940	7,883	57.04%	5,875	42.51%	63	0.46%
1944	7,364	55.64%	5,793	43.77%	78	0.59%
1948	7,993	51.98%	7,102	46.18%	283	1.84%
1952	11,987	67.28%	5,738	32.21%	92	0.52%
1956	11,827	66.04%	6,076	33.93%	7	0.04%
1960	11,786	63.64%	6,721	36.29%	12	0.06%
1964	8,102	46.05%	9,481	53.89%	11	0.06%
1968	10,042	59.34%	5,841	34.52%	1,040	6.15%
1972	12,579	67.87%	5,364	28.94%	590	3.18%
1976	10,883	59.15%	7,012	38.11%	505	2.74%
1980	11,223	59.14%	5,825	30.70%	1,929	10.16%
1984	12,361	63.72%	6,804	35.08%	233	1.20%
1988	9,683	55.64%	7,448	42.80%	272	1.56%
1992	7,894	39.71%	7,325	36.84%	4,662	23.45%
1996	9,085	46.62%	8,038	41.25%	2,363	12.13%
2000	13,304	62.27%	7,188	33.64%	873	4.09%
2004	14,323	62.48%	8,257	36.02%	345	1.50%
2008	14,182	57.35%	10,081	40.77%	464	1.88%
2012	14,648	58.34%	9,768	38.90%	692	2.76%
2016	13,651	52.05%	9,694	36.96%	2,883	10.99%
2020	16,400	52.46%	13,690	43.79%	1,171	3.75%
2024	15,476	52.34%	13,106	44.32%	986	3.33%

Walla Walla County is generally Republican; it has voted for that party in all but one presidential election since 1940, and has voted Democratic just five times since Washington's statehood in 1889. Like the state as a whole, third-party candidates often receive a larger share of the vote than they do nationally. The county is part of Washington's 5th congressional district, which is represented by Republican Michael Baumgaurtner.

== Education ==
School districts in Walla Walla County include:

- College Place School District
- Columbia School District
- Miller Creek Elementary School District
- Prescott School District
- Touchet School District
- Waitsburg School District
- Walla Walla Public Schools

== Media ==
=== Newspapers ===
- Walla Walla Union-Bulletin
- Waitsburg Times

=== Radio ===
- KGTS
- KUJ (AM)

== See also ==
- National Register of Historic Places listings in Walla Walla County, Washington
