= Touchet, Washington =

- CDP
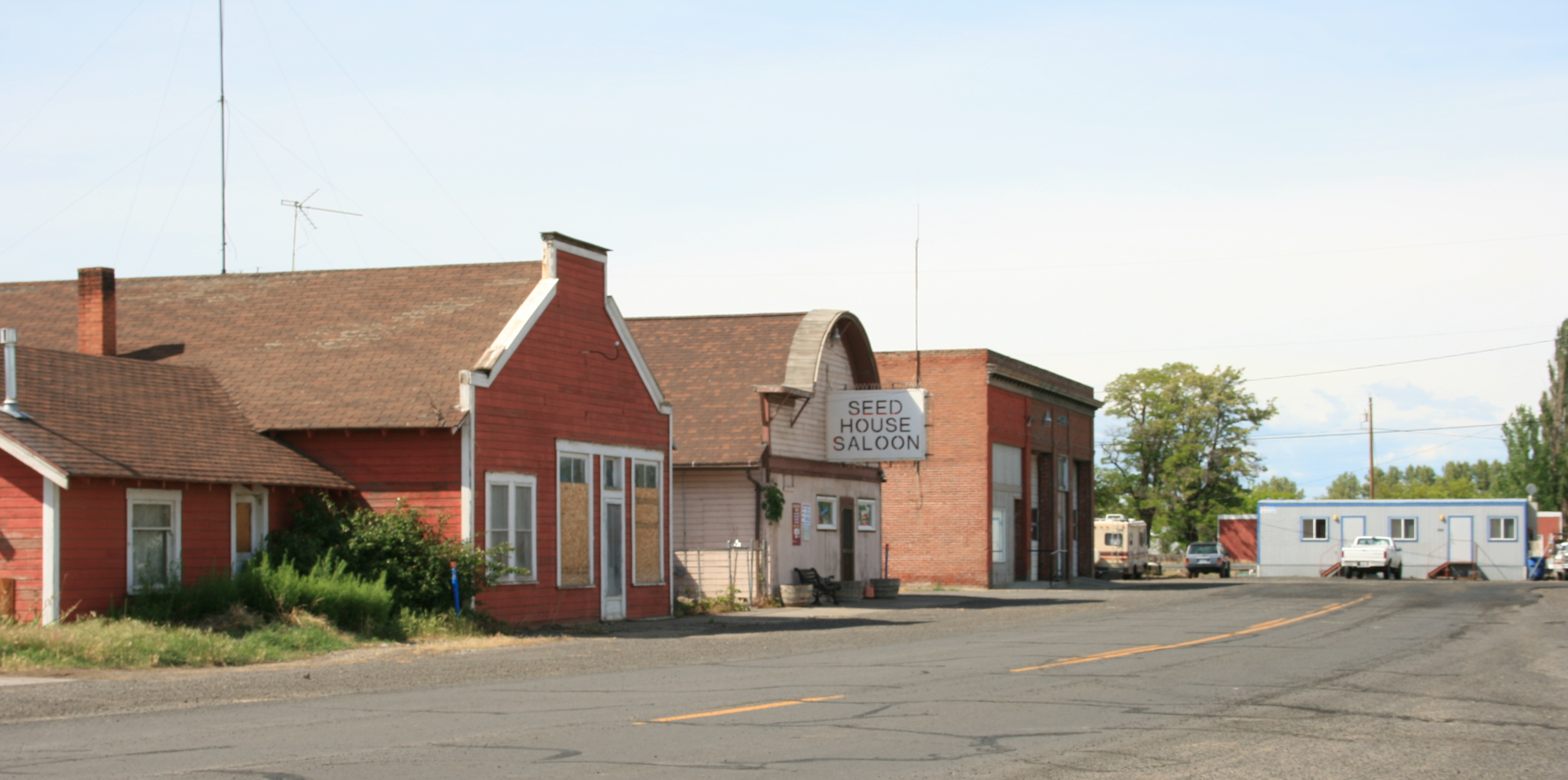

- Location of Touchet, Washington
- Coordinates: 46°02′28″N 118°40′21″W
- Country: United States
- State: Washington
- County: Walla Walla

Area
  - Total: 1.2 sq mi (3.1 km^{2})
  - Land: 1.2 sq mi (3.1 km^{2})
  - Water: 0 sq mi (0.0 km^{2})
- Elevation: 446 ft (136 m)

Population (2020)
  - Total: 425
  - Density: 360/sq mi (140/km^{2})
- Time zone: UTC-8 (Pacific (PST))
  - Summer (DST): UTC-7 (PDT)
- ZIP code: 99360
- Area code: 509
- FIPS code: 53-72030
- GNIS feature ID: 2409342

Touchet (/ˈtuːʃi/ TOO-shee) is a census-designated place (CDP) in Walla Walla County, Washington, United States. As of the 2020 census, Touchet had a population of 425.

== History ==
Prior to removal to reservations, there was a village of Walla Walla people located near the present townsite. This site was called Tuushi, meaning "baking salmon on sticks over coals", a name based on a coyote myth. Bands of Palouse, Yakamas, Umatilla, Walla Walla and Wanapum, that used this area were collectively called Nez Perce by Lewis and Clark when they passed through the Walla Walla Valley on their return journey in 1806.

Settlers from the east came to the valley in the early 1850s, but shortly left due to conflicts with the Native people. Homesteaders returned to the valley in 1859.

The Walla Walla & Columbia River Railroad from Wallula to Walla Walla was not completed until 1875, but by March 1874, 16 miles of track were completed up to Touchet. By the end of that year Touchet farmers shipped 4,000 tons of wheat and received 1,100 tons of merchandise.

Touchet has never been officially incorporated.

== Geography ==
According to the United States Census Bureau, the CDP has a total area of 1.2 square miles (3.1 km^{2}), all of it land.

=== Climate ===
According to the Köppen Climate Classification system, Touchet has a warm-summer Mediterranean climate, abbreviated "Csa" on climate maps.

== Demographics ==
Historical population
Census	Pop.	Note	%±
2000	396		—
2010	421		6.3%
2020	425		1.0%
U.S. Decennial Census; 1970 1980 1990; 2000 2010

Touchet first appeared as a census designated place in the 2000 U.S. census.

=== Racial and ethnic composition ===
Touchet CDP, Washington – Racial and ethnic composition Note: the US Census treats Hispanic/Latino as an ethnic category. This table excludes Latinos from the racial categories and assigns them to a separate category. Hispanics/Latinos may be of any race.
Race / Ethnicity (NH = Non-Hispanic)	Pop 2000	Pop 2010	Pop 2020	% 2000	% 2010	% 2020
White alone (NH)	323	307	257	81.57%	72.92%	60.47%
Black or African American alone (NH)	0	0	2	0.00%	0.00%	0.47%
Native American or Alaska Native alone (NH)	2	4	4	0.51%	0.95%	0.94%
Asian alone (NH)	0	5	1	0.00%	1.19%	0.24%
Native Hawaiian or Pacific Islander alone (NH)	0	1	0	0.00%	0.24%	0.00%
Other race alone (NH)	0	0	0	0.00%	0.00%	0.00%
Mixed race or Multiracial (NH)	9	5	14	2.27%	1.19%	3.29%
Hispanic or Latino (any race)	62	99	147	15.66%	23.52%	34.59%
Total	396	421	425	100.00%	100.00%	100.00%

=== 2000 census ===
As of the census of 2000, there were 396 people, 135 households, and 112 families residing in the CDP. The population density was 326.1 people per square mile (125.9 people/km^{2}). There were 140 housing units at an average density of 115.3 units per square mile (44.5 units/km^{2}). The racial makeup of the CDP was 92.68% White, 0.76% Native American, 4.29% from other races, and 2.27% from two or more races. Hispanic or Latino of any race were 15.66% of the population.

There were 135 households, out of which 48.1% had children under the age of 18 living with them, 71.9% were married couples living together, 8.1% had a female householder with no husband present, and 16.3% were non-families. 15.6% of all households were made up of individuals, and 6.7% had someone living alone who was 65 years of age or older. The average household size was 2.93 and the average family size was 3.27.

In the CDP, the age distribution of the population shows 34.6% under the age of 18, 4.3% from 18 to 24, 30.1% from 25 to 44, 22.5% from 45 to 64, and 8.6% who were 65 years of age or older. The median age was 34 years. For every 100 females, there were 107.3 males. For every 100 females age 18 and over, there were 100.8 males.

The median income for a household in the CDP was $37,500, and the median income for a family was $50,278. Males had a median income of $37,031 versus $22,115 for females. The per capita income for the CDP was $15,684. About 10.9% of families and 13.4% of the population were below the poverty line, including 18.8% of those under age 18 and 27.0% of those age 65 or over.

== See also ==
- Touchet Formation
- Touchet River
