= Covello, Washington =

Unincorporated community in Columbia County, Washington

- Unincorporated community
- Location within Washington (state) Location within the United States
- Coordinates: 46°23′00″N 117°49′59″W
- Country: United States
- State: Washington
- County: Columbia
- Elevation: 2,435 ft (742 m)
- Time zone: UTC-8 (Pacific (PST))
  - Summer (DST): UTC-7 (PDT)
- GNIS feature ID: 1510894

Covello is an unincorporated community in Columbia County, in the U.S. state of Washington.

== History ==
Covello was named in 1882 when a country store opened at the town site. A post office called Covello was established in 1883, and remained in operation until 1918.
