= Huntsville, Washington =

Unincorporated community in Columbia County, Washington

- Unincorporated community
- Location within Washington (state) Location within the United States
- Coordinates: 46°17′14″N 118°06′26″W
- Country: United States
- State: Washington
- County: Columbia
- Elevation: 1,312 ft (400 m)
- Time zone: UTC-8 (Pacific (PST))
  - Summer (DST): UTC-7 (PDT)
- GNIS feature ID: 1512316

Huntsville is an unincorporated community in Columbia County, in the U.S. state of Washington.

== History ==
A post office called Huntsville was established in 1880, and remained in operation until 1968. The community was named for B. J. Hunt, an original owner of the town site.
