= Ski Bluewood =

Ski area in Washington, United States

- Location in the United States Location in Washington
- Location: Umatilla National Forest; Columbia County, Washington, U.S.
- Nearest city: Dayton - 22 mi (35 km); Walla Walla - 52 mi (84 km)
- Coordinates: 46.082°N 117.851°W
- Vertical: 1,125 ft (343 m)
- Top elevation: 5,670 ft (1,728 m)
- Base elevation: 4,545 ft (1,385 m)
- Skiable area: 530 acres (2.1 km^{2})
- Trails: 24: 27% easiest; 43% more difficult; 30% most difficult
- Longest run: 2.2 miles (3.5 km); Country Road
- Lift system: 2 triple chairs - (fixed-grip); 2 Magic Carpet
- Lift capacity: 3,950 / hr.
- Terrain parks: 1
- Snowfall: 300 inches (760 cm)
- Snowmaking: none
- Night skiing: none
- Website: bluewood.com

Ski Bluewood, formerly known as "Bluewood Ski Area," is an alpine ski area in the northwestern United States, in southeastern Washington in Columbia County. Located at the northern end of the Blue Mountains in the Umatilla National Forest, the elevation at the base area is 4,545 feet (1,385 m) above sea level, with a summit of 5,670 feet (1,728 m) for a vertical drop of 1,125 feet (343 m). The northward-facing slopes are about four miles (6.5 km) north of the Oregon border and fifty miles (80 km) west of Idaho, part of the headwaters of the Touchet River, the main tributary of the Walla Walla River.

The only surface access to the base area of the mountain is through Dayton, 22 miles (35 km) to the northwest and nearly 3,000 feet (900 m) below on North Touchet Road. Though the summit is only about twenty miles (32 km) due east of Walla Walla as the crow flies, Ski Bluewood is about an hour's drive as Dayton is thirty miles (50 km) northeast on U.S. Route 12. In addition to Walla Walla, Bluewood is the closest alpine ski area (in mileage) to the Tri-Cities to the west, and the closest chairlift-served area to Lewiston-Clarkston.

== History ==
Originally conceived in the 1960s, and created by Skyline Basin Associates during the 1970s, the ski area's original name (as a concept) was "Skyline Basin." After years of planning, fundraising, and approval procedures, the ski area opened as "Bluewood Ski Area" in January 1980.

The second season of 1980–81 was a very poor snow year, with only three days of skiing, and the fledgling ski area filed for Chapter 11 bankruptcy protection in August 1981. Auctioned off two years later and acquired by Rainier Bank, it was purchased for $550,000 in October 1983 by Portland executive Stan Goodell, a former president of the ski patrol at Mount Hood. To distance itself from the past financial difficulties, Goodell renamed it "Ski Bluewood" and relocated to Dayton to run the area himself.

An expansion in the summer of 1986 added parking and the Triple Nickel, a triple chairlift to serve the instructional area with a vertical rise of 400 feet (120 m). It joined the existing lifts, the Skyline Express triple chair and Easy Rider platter lift, which was relocated.

== Alpine skiing ==
Of its 24 runs, Bluewood has 4 green circles (easiest), 12 blue squares (more difficult), and 8 black diamonds (most difficult). Additionally, there is one terrain park and six backcountry runs. The area is open five days per week, Wednesday through Sunday, plus holidays. Bluewood has a reputation for dry powder snow, tree skiing, and a family-friendly atmosphere.

Will Brandenburg, a World Cup racer with the U.S. Ski Team, learned to ski and race at Bluewood in the 1990s.

== Base Facilities ==
Ski Bluewood facilities include a full-service ski/snowboard rental department, retail shop, patrol services, ski and snowboard learning center, cafe, and pub.

Bluewood is one of the few resorts in the country that is 100% self-sufficient, generating all of its own electric power via diesel generators. There are two diesel generators in the basement, one that runs the lodge at night and the other that runs the lodge and the two electric chair lifts during the day. The main chairlift (Skyline Express) has its own separate diesel powered generator, connected via a clutch and fluid coupler. The Triple Nickel and pama lifts are electric and uses power from the main diesel generators, located in the basement of the lodge.
