= Touchet River =

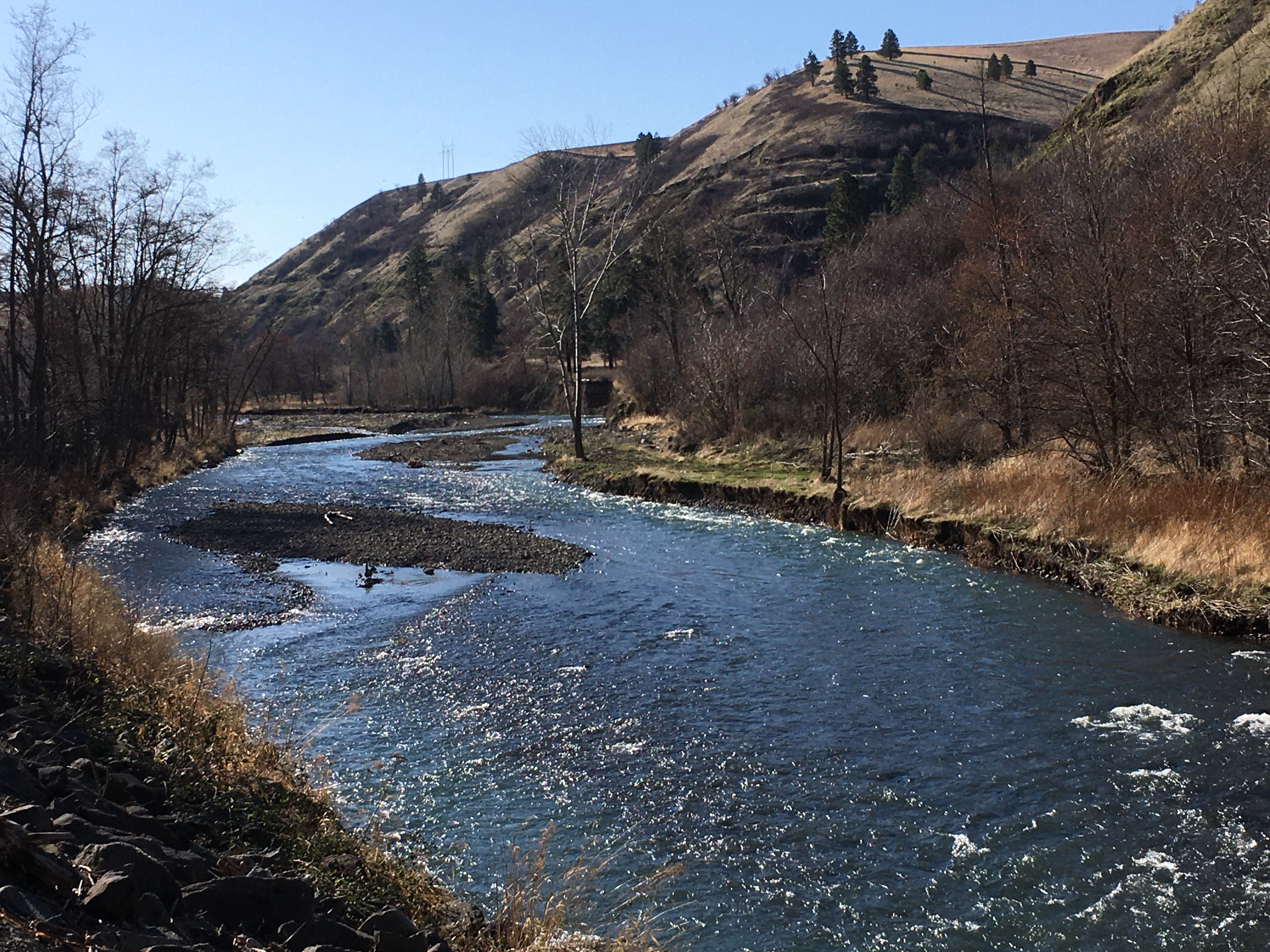
- Touchet River in Dayton in spring

- Location of the mouth of the Touchet River in Washington

Location
- Country: United States
- State: Washington
- County: Walla Walla, Columbia

Physical characteristics
- Source: Confluence of North and South forks, Touchet River
  - location: Dayton, Columbia County
  - coordinates: 46°18′05″N 117°57′32″W
  - elevation: 1,671 ft (509 m)
- Mouth: Walla Walla River
  - location: Touchet, Walla Walla County
  - coordinates: 46°02′01″N 118°40′59″W
  - elevation: 430 ft (130 m)
- Length: 65 mi (105 km)
- Basin size: 752 sq mi (1,950 km^{2})

The Touchet River /ˈtuːʃi/ is a 65-mile (105 km) tributary of the Walla Walla River in southeastern Washington in the United States. The Touchet River drains an area of about 752 square miles (1,950 km^{2}) in Columbia County and Walla Walla County.

The upper Touchet was a traditional summer meeting place for trade and games for the Palus, Nez Perce and Walla Walla tribes. The name Touchet derives from the similarly pronounced Sahaptin term for the river, Tu-se meaning roasting. Nez Perce legend tells that coyote roasted salmon at this river after breaking a fish dam guarded by the seven swallow sisters at Celilo.

The USGS cited two variant names, Pouchet River and Toosha River.

== Geography ==
The Touchet River is formed by several forks draining the north slope of the Blue Mountains above Dayton in Columbia County. All the forks have their head in the Walla Walla Ranger District of the Umatilla National Forest. The North Fork, about 25 miles (40 km) long, begins near Ski Bluewood, while the 20-mile (32 km) South Fork is formed by the confluence of Green Fork and Burnt Fork near Deadman Peak. The North Fork is also joined by the Wolf Fork and its tributary Robinson Fork, which drain the area between the North and South Forks.

The North Fork and South Fork join at Baileysburg, forming the main Touchet River, which flows north through Dayton where it is joined by Patit Creek and turns west. Below Dayton, it enters Walla Walla County and flows through the long Touchet Valley, past Waitsburg (where it is joined by Coppei Creek) and Prescott (where it is joined by Whetstone Creek). Near the former settlement of Lamar (east of Eureka) the river turns south flowing through rolling hills to its confluence with the Walla Walla River at Touchet, approximately 22 miles (35 km) upstream from where the Walla Walla joins the Snake River.

The United States Geological Survey (USGS) operated a gaging station on the Touchet River at Bolles (between Waitsburg and Prescott) from 1924 to 1989. The average annual discharge was 226 cu ft/s (6.4 m^{3}/s) with monthly averages ranging from a high of 440 cu ft/s (12 m^{3}/s) in February to a low of 35 cu ft/s (0.99 m^{3}/s) in August. A record peak flow of 9,350 cu ft/s (265 m^{3}/s) was set on December 23, 1964, during the Christmas flood of 1964.

== Recreation ==
The Touchet is known for its rainbow and cutthroat trout fishing, especially in the upper and middle reaches.

Summer steelhead, which like salmon are anadromous, and Chinook salmon spawn throughout a large portion of the middle and upper reaches of the Touchet River drainage, the population is imperiled in the 21st century. The Nine Mile Dam, constructed in 1905 on the Walla Walla River below the confluence with the Touchet River, impeded anadromous fish migration into the Touchet, but a wild steelhead population (listed as threatened under the Endangered Species Act) continues to return to the river.

== History ==
=== Native peoples ===
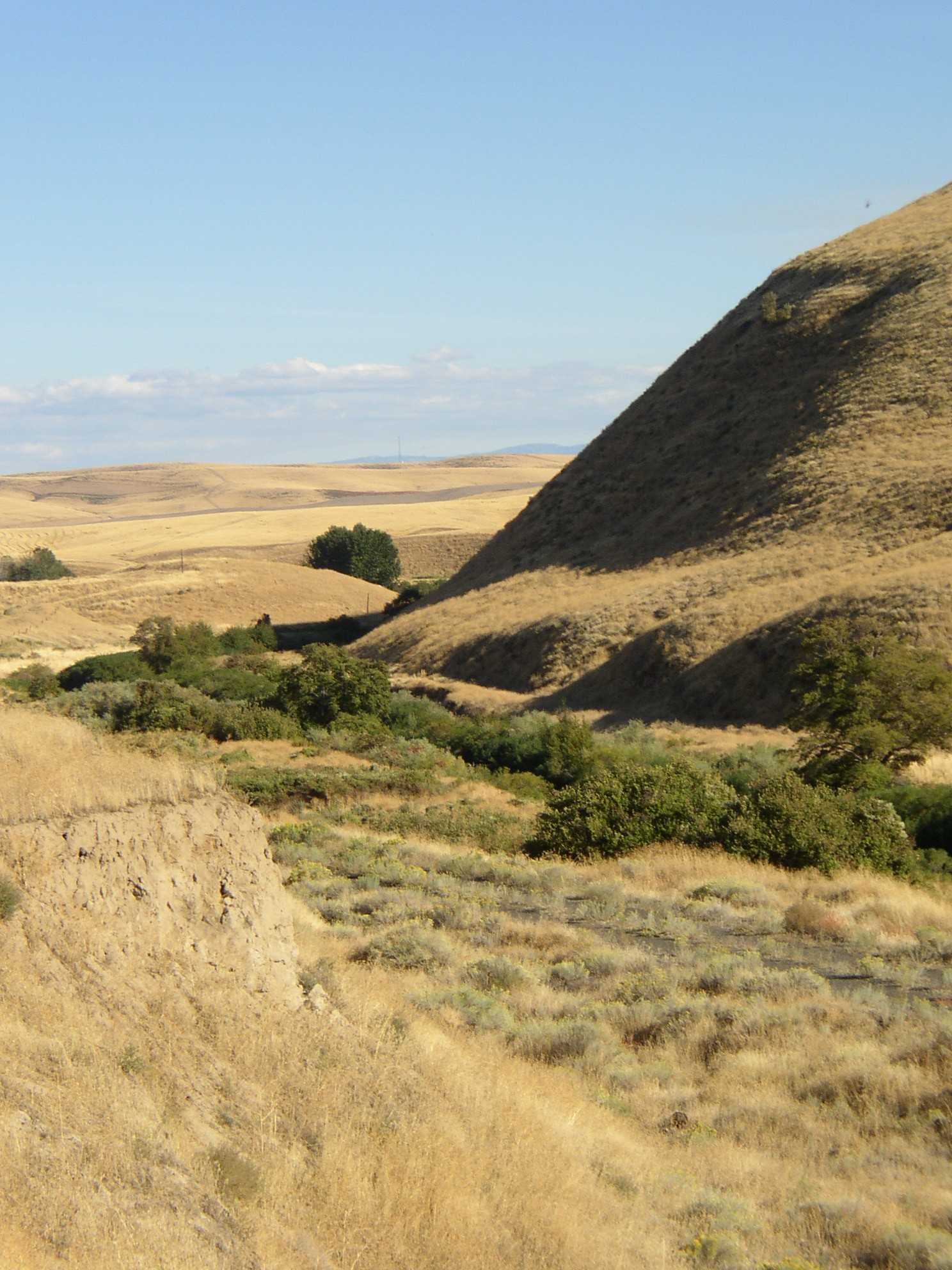
Touchet River Valley in the fall, slightly west of Lamar Cabin.

The Touchet River lay in the traditional range of the Palus American Indian tribe, marking their southern border with the range of the Walla Walla tribe. These peoples were of the Sahaptin-speaking group which traditionally inhabited the Columbia Plateau region of the northwestern United States.

Roots provided plentiful food along the Touchet Rivers. These included quamash, camas, kouse, bitterroots, serviceberry (currant), chokecherry, huckleberry, gooseberries, rose berries and whortleberries, elderberries, wild strawberries, wild onions and balsamroot. Once Euroamerican immigrants began settling the area after 1858, Indian root grounds were displaced by agriculture.

Prior to the white man coming into the valley of the Touchet River, there was an established American Indian trail through the valley, the Nez Perce Trail to Celilo Falls or Old Celilo Falls Trail, by which the Nez Perce (also part of the Sahaptin-speaking group) passed west to fish for salmon at Celilo Falls on the Columbia River. As with other Sahaptin-speaking peoples, the Nez Perce were migratory, returning to the same locations year after year; Celilo Falls lay at the western end of their annual range.

=== Lewis and Clark expedition ===
On their return journey in 1806, the Lewis and Clark Expedition followed the Old Celilo Falls Trail, up the Walla Walla and Touchet River Valleys; they camped on the Touchet about 12 miles (19 km) north of today's town of Touchet on April 30, 1806. The Lewis and Clark Trail State Park commemorates their May 1, 1806 campsite on the Touchet River. The expedition left the Touchet River to follow a tributary, Patit Creek, at what is now Dayton. They camped about 2 miles (3 km) above modern-day Dayton on Patit Creek on May 2, 1806, before following the trail across country to the Tucannon River.

=== Early settlement ===
The Whitman Mission catalyzed white settlement of the region, beginning in 1843 when 1,000 people, 120 wagons, and approximately 5,000 horses and cattle came to the Walla Walla valley. The initial settlers remained near the current city of Walla Walla and into the Touchet River valley.

=== Later settlement ===
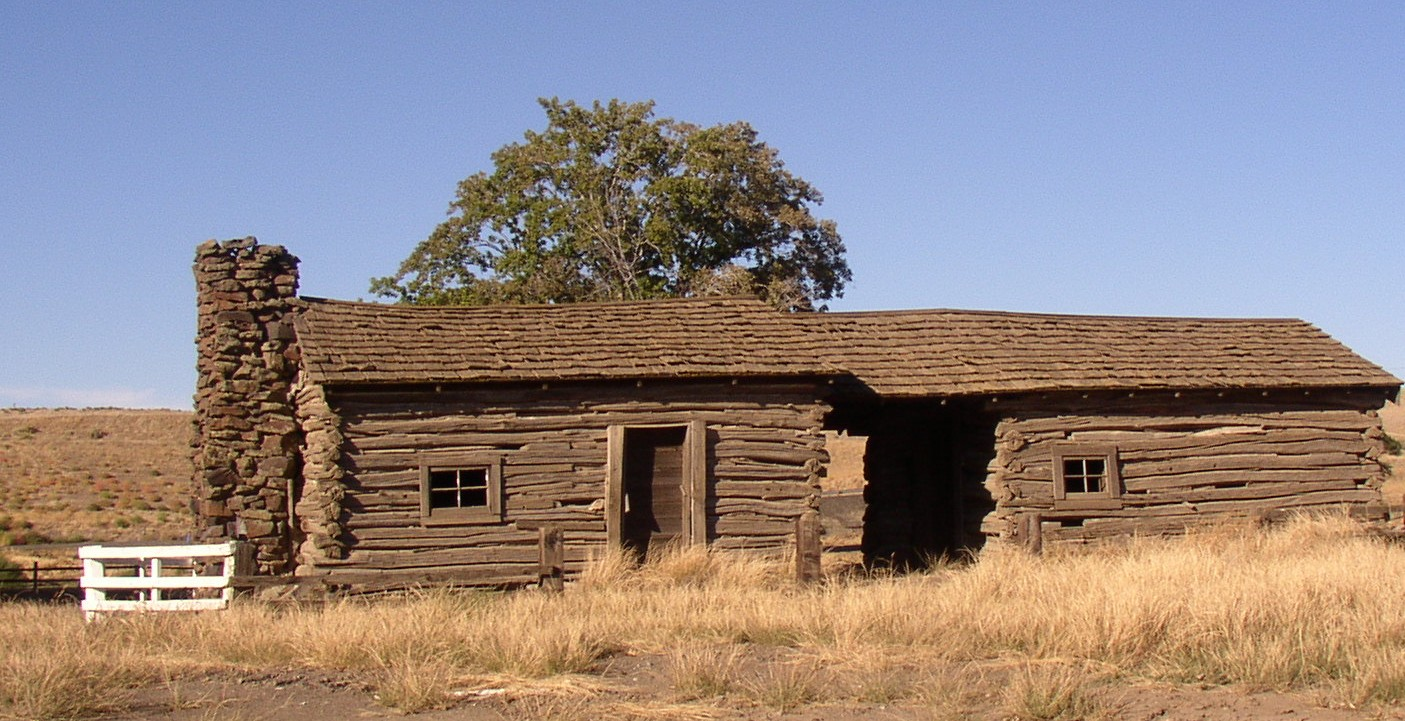
Lamar Cabin

The Lamar Cabin, built in 1863 of hand-hewn cottonwood logs from the Touchet River valley by George Dudley Goodwin, became the home of the bachelor brothers James and Joseph Lamar in 1872 (women were rare in the valley and many men remained unmarried). The brothers initially raised sheep and horses; in later years they, mirroring the transitions of many others in the region, cultivated dryland winter wheat. This area developed into the town of Lamar when the Hunt Railroad was built along the Touchet River valley in 1888. The railway left the Touchet River and continued west at Lamar at the point where the Touchet River turns south to meet the Walla Walla. Although the town site is now virtually abandoned, the historic Lamar cabin is preserved to this day (see photo).

Near the head of the Touchet valley, Dayton was officially incorporated on November 10, 1881.

== See also ==
- List of Washington rivers
- List of tributaries of the Columbia River
- Touchet, Washington
- Touchet Formation
