= Dayton, Washington =

Dayton
- City
- Dayton, Washington
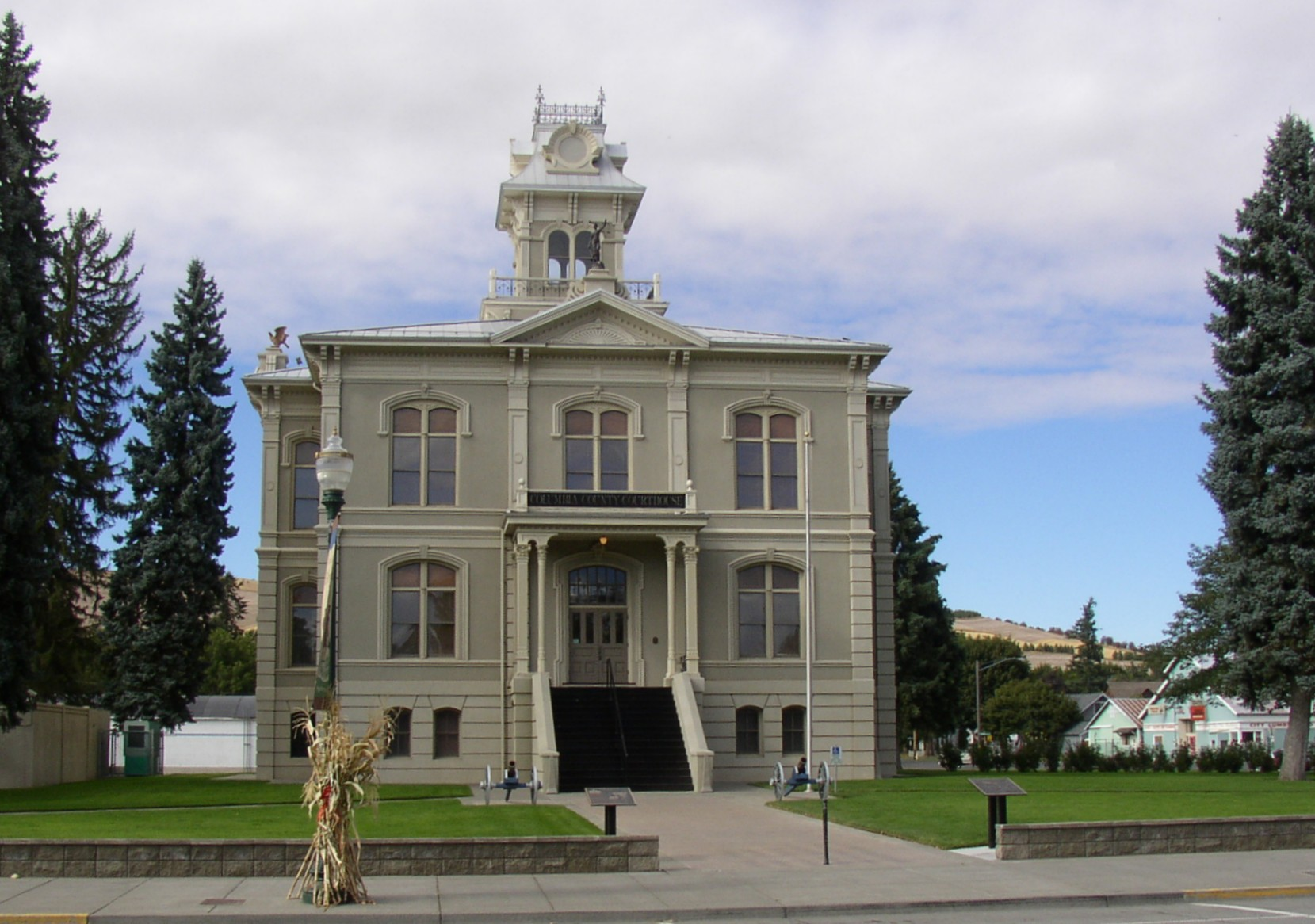
- Columbia County Courthouse in Dayton

- Location of Dayton, Washington
- Coordinates: 46°18′59″N 117°59′35″W
- Country: United States
- State: Washington
- County: Columbia

Government
  - Type: Mayor–council
  - Mayor: Roger Trump

Area
  - Total: 1.44 sq mi (3.73 km^{2})
  - Land: 1.44 sq mi (3.73 km^{2})
  - Water: 0 sq mi (0.00 km^{2})
- Elevation: 1,618 ft (493 m)

Population (2020)
  - Total: 2,448
  - Density: 1,700/sq mi (656/km^{2})
- Time zone: UTC−8 (Pacific (PST))
  - Summer (DST): UTC−7 (PDT)
- ZIP code: 99328
- Area code: 509
- FIPS code: 53-16970
- GNIS feature ID: 2410301
- Website: City of Dayton

Dayton is a city in and the county seat of Columbia County, Washington, United States. The population was 2,448 at the 2020 census.

== History ==
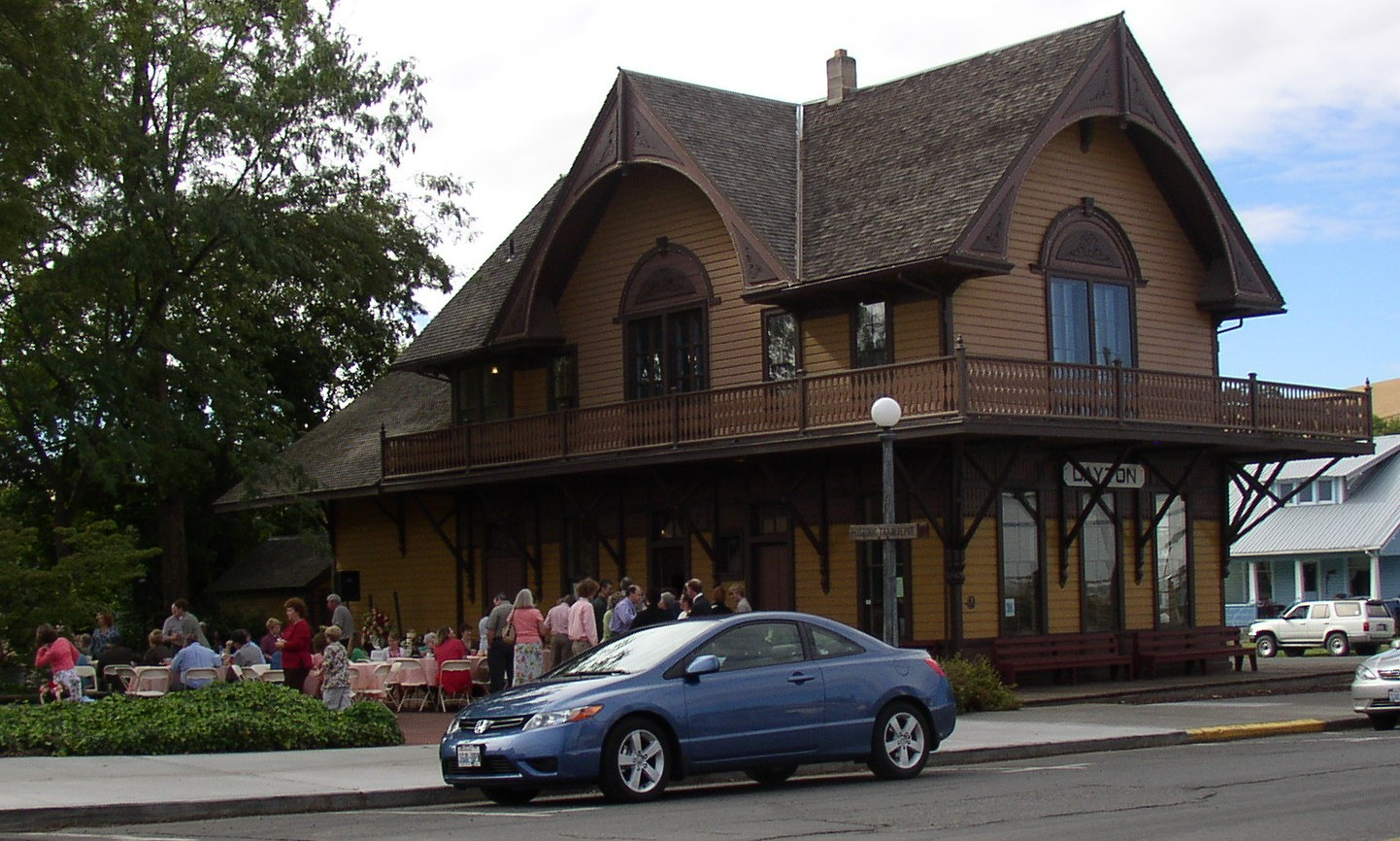
Historic railway depot in Dayton

Dayton was founded in the 1860s. A town site plat was filed by Jesse N. and Elizabeth Day on November 23, 1871. The city was officially incorporated on November 10, 1881, and was named for Jesse Day.

Dayton has the oldest train depot in Washington state, dating from 1881, and the oldest continuously used courthouse, operating since 1887. The historic community of Baileysburg was situated about one mile southeast of Dayton, at the junction of North Touchet and South Touchet Roads.

In the 1980s and 1990s, the town underwent a $3 million restoration program, repairing the historic depot and historic courthouse, adding pedestrian amenities to Main Street, and creating a National Historic District.

== Geography ==
According to the United States Census Bureau, Dayton has a total area of 1.43 square miles (3.70 km^{2}), all of it land. The Touchet River runs through the city.

Dayton has a Mediterranean climate (Köppen Csb) with hot summers (though nights are pleasantly cool) and chilly, though not severe, winters with only very moderate snowfall. Dayton's winter climate is somewhat milder than most of eastern Washington. Precipitation is moderate for most of the year except for a dry period between July and September, at which time major wildfires are very common in the region due to the hot days and very low humidity.

Climate data for Dayton, Washington (1991–2020 normals, extremes 1893–present)
Month	Jan	Feb	Mar	Apr	May	Jun	Jul	Aug	Sep	Oct	Nov	Dec	Year
Record high °F (°C)	70 (21)	74 (23)	84 (29)	93 (34)	101 (38)	111 (44)	109 (43)	114 (46)	105 (41)	92 (33)	80 (27)	69 (21)	114 (46)
Mean daily maximum °F (°C)	41.5 (5.3)	46.2 (7.9)	53.9 (12.2)	61.1 (16.2)	69.9 (21.1)	76.8 (24.9)	87.6 (30.9)	86.7 (30.4)	77.2 (25.1)	62.9 (17.2)	49.3 (9.6)	40.7 (4.8)	62.8 (17.1)
Daily mean °F (°C)	34.0 (1.1)	37.2 (2.9)	43.4 (6.3)	49.4 (9.7)	57.2 (14.0)	63.4 (17.4)	71.3 (21.8)	70.5 (21.4)	62.2 (16.8)	50.4 (10.2)	40.2 (4.6)	33.6 (0.9)	51.1 (10.6)
Mean daily minimum °F (°C)	26.4 (−3.1)	28.2 (−2.1)	33.0 (0.6)	37.8 (3.2)	44.5 (6.9)	49.9 (9.9)	54.9 (12.7)	54.2 (12.3)	47.2 (8.4)	38.0 (3.3)	31.0 (−0.6)	26.5 (−3.1)	39.3 (4.1)
Record low °F (°C)	−22 (−30)	−22 (−30)	2 (−17)	12 (−11)	18 (−8)	22 (−6)	30 (−1)	28 (−2)	18 (−8)	7 (−14)	−10 (−23)	−25 (−32)	−25 (−32)
Average precipitation inches (mm)	2.08 (53)	1.72 (44)	2.24 (57)	1.86 (47)	1.80 (46)	1.24 (31)	0.39 (9.9)	0.45 (11)	0.73 (19)	1.54 (39)	2.43 (62)	2.31 (59)	18.79 (477)
Average snowfall inches (cm)	6.3 (16)	1.9 (4.8)	1.0 (2.5)	0.1 (0.25)	0.0 (0.0)	0.0 (0.0)	0.0 (0.0)	0.0 (0.0)	0.0 (0.0)	0.1 (0.25)	1.2 (3.0)	5.2 (13)	15.8 (40)
Average precipitation days (≥ 0.01 in)	13.5	12.0	13.1	11.6	9.8	7.4	3.1	3.0	5.1	9.9	14.1	14.3	116.9
Average snowy days (≥ 0.1 in)	3.4	2.4	0.9	0.1	0.0	0.0	0.0	0.0	0.0	0.1	1.0	3.6	11.5
Source: NOAA

== Demographics ==
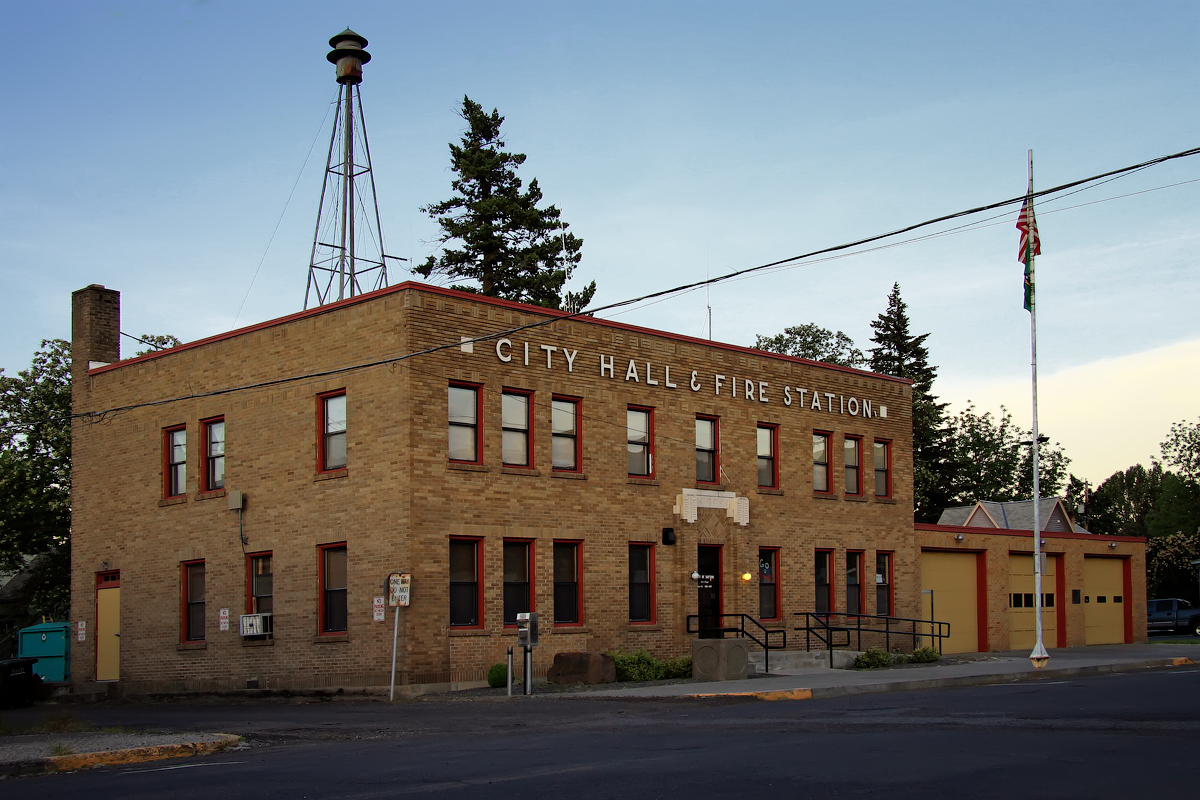
Dayton City Hall

Historical population
Census	Pop.	Note	%±
1880	996		—
1890	1,880		88.8%
1900	2,216		17.9%
1910	2,389		7.8%
1920	2,695		12.8%
1930	2,528		−6.2%
1940	3,026		19.7%
1950	2,979		−1.6%
1960	2,913		−2.2%
1970	2,596		−10.9%
1980	2,565		−1.2%
1990	2,468		−3.8%
2000	2,655		7.6%
2010	2,526		−4.9%
2020	2,448		−3.1%
U.S. Decennial Census; 2020 Census

=== 2020 census ===
As of the 2020 census, Dayton had a population of 2,448. The median age was 52.0 years. 17.3% of residents were under the age of 18 and 27.7% of residents were 65 years of age or older. For every 100 females there were 96.8 males, and for every 100 females age 18 and over there were 94.9 males age 18 and over.

0.0% of residents lived in urban areas, while 100.0% lived in rural areas.

There were 1,099 households in Dayton, of which 22.0% had children under the age of 18 living in them. Of all households, 42.2% were married-couple households, 22.0% were households with a male householder and no spouse or partner present, and 29.7% were households with a female householder and no spouse or partner present. About 33.9% of all households were made up of individuals and 18.2% had someone living alone who was 65 years of age or older.

There were 1,227 housing units, of which 10.4% were vacant. The homeowner vacancy rate was 2.3% and the rental vacancy rate was 7.0%.

Racial composition as of the 2020 census
Race	Number	Percent
White	2,099	85.7%
Black or African American	8	0.3%
American Indian and Alaska Native	41	1.7%
Asian	20	0.8%
Native Hawaiian and Other Pacific Islander	0	0.0%
Some other race	83	3.4%
Two or more races	197	8.0%
Hispanic or Latino (of any race)	204	8.3%

=== 2010 census ===
At the 2010 census there were 2,526 people, 1,082 households, and 670 families living in the city. The population density was 1,766.4 inhabitants per square mile (682.0/km^{2}). There were 1,200 housing units at an average density of 839.2 per square mile (324.0/km^{2}). The racial makeup of the city was 91.6% White, 0.4% African American, 1.9% Native American, 0.6% Asian, 0.6% Pacific Islander, 1.8% from other races, and 3.2% from two or more races. Hispanic or Latino of any race were 7.1%.

Of the 1,082 households 25.7% had children under the age of 18 living with them, 47.0% were married couples living together, 10.8% had a female householder with no husband present, 4.2% had a male householder with no wife present, and 38.1% were non-families. 33.1% of households were one person and 15.8% were one person aged 65 or older. The average household size was 2.27 and the average family size was 2.85.

The median age was 46.3 years. 21.6% of residents were under the age of 18; 6.2% were between the ages of 18 and 24; 20.1% were from 25 to 44; 30% were from 45 to 64; and 22.2% were 65 or older. The gender makeup of the city was 49.0% male and 51.0% female.

=== 2000 census ===
At the 2000 census, there were 2,655 people, 1,081 households, and 695 families living in the city. The population density was 1,803.0 people per square mile (697.3/km^{2}). There were 1,181 housing units at an average density of 802.0 per square mile (310.2/km^{2}). The racial makeup of the city was 92.58% White, 0.30% African American, 1.05% Native American, 0.49% Asian, 0.04% Pacific Islander, 3.54% from other races, and 2.00% from two or more races. Hispanic or Latino of any race were 8.17% of the population.

Of the 1,081 households 30.6% had children under the age of 18 living with them, 51.4% were married couples living together, 9.5% had a female householder with no husband present, and 35.7% were non-families. 31.9% of households were one person and 15.4% were one person aged 65 or older. The average household size was 2.39 and the average family size was 3.02.

The age distribution was 25.8% under the age of 18, 7.8% from 18 to 24, 23.1% from 25 to 44, 24.5% from 45 to 64, and 18.9% 65 or older. The median age was 40 years. For every 100 females, there were 91.6 males. For every 100 females age 18 and over, there were 90.1 males.

The median household income was $31,409 and the median family income was $40,714. Males had a median income of $31,395 versus $21,339 for females. The per capita income for the city was $15,925. About 10.3% of families and 13.3% of the population were below the poverty line, including 17.0% of those under age 18 and 9.6% of those age 65 or over.

== Education ==
The city's public school system is managed by the Dayton School District, which covers the vast majority of Columbia County.

A library within the city is operated by the Columbia County Rural Library District. People living in Dayton are in the library's taxation base, but not in the library's voting base; the voting area for the library only consists of unincorporated areas. The library was established in 1919 as a small reading room while a women's civics club fundraised for a permanent building. The raised funds were transferred to the Dayton city government in 1935 and used to construct a public library in 1937 using New Deal funding; the building was later expanded in 1947.

It is the only public library in Columbia County. A ballot measure submitted in 2023 proposed to close the rural library district, and therefore the library itself, entirely due to the placement and availability of children's books on racial issues and LGBT topics; amid then-ongoing book banning efforts in the United States, the library would have been the first one nationwide to close over such a dispute if it succeeded, according to the American Library Association. The library collection would be received by the Washington State Library if the rural library district was dissolved. The initiative was ruled unconstitutional in September 2023 by the Columbia County Superior Court due to its exclusion of voters in incorporated areas; the ruling blocked the initiative from appearing on the November 2023 ballot.

== Notable residents ==
- Dmitri Borgmann, writer
- Frank Finkel, claimed lone survivor of the Battle of the Little Bighorn
- Frederick Gilbreath, United States Army General
- Robert Shields, diarist

== See also ==
- National Register of Historic Places listings in Columbia County, Washington
