= Columbia County, Washington =

County in Washington, United States

- County
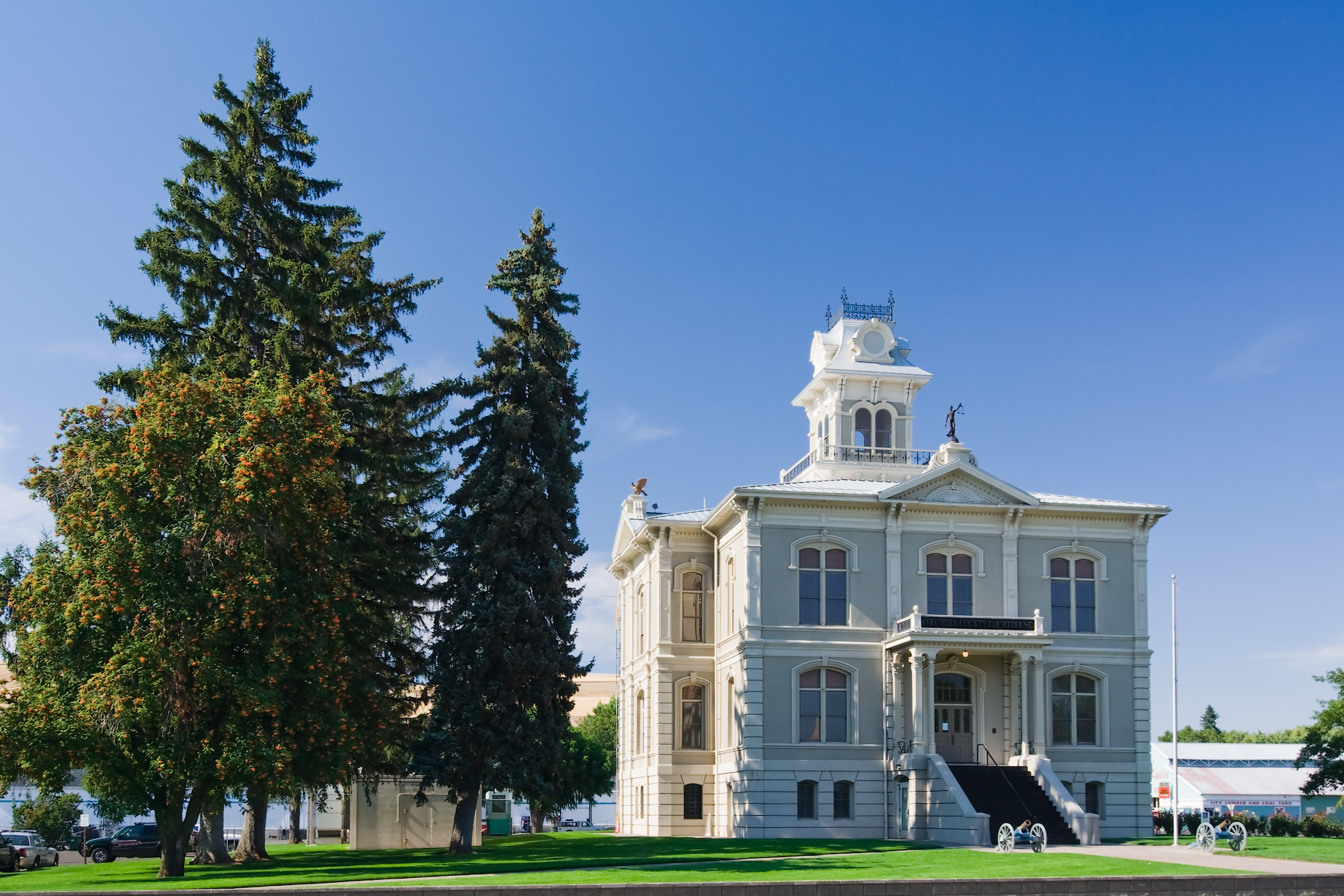
- Columbia County Courthouse in Dayton

- Seal

- Location within the U.S. state of Washington
- Coordinates: 46°18′N 117°55′W
- Country: United States
- State: Washington
- Founded: November 11, 1875
- Named for: Columbia River
- Seat: Dayton
- Largest city: Dayton

Area
  - Total: 873 sq mi (2,260 km^{2})
  - Land: 869 sq mi (2,250 km^{2})
  - Water: 4.9 sq mi (13 km^{2}) 0.6%

Population (2020)
  - Total: 3,952
  - Estimate (2025): 4,141 ▲
  - Density: 4.6/sq mi (1.8/km^{2})
- Time zone: UTC−8 (Pacific)
  - Summer (DST): UTC−7 (PDT)
- Congressional district: 5th
- Website: www.columbiaco.com

Columbia County is a county located in the U.S. state of Washington. As of the 2020 census, the population was 3,952, making it the second-least populous county in Washington. The county seat and largest city is Dayton. The county was created out of Walla Walla County on November 11, 1875, and is named after the Columbia River (which does not flow through the county). Columbia County is included in the Walla Walla, WA Metropolitan Statistical Area.

== Geography ==
According to the United States Census Bureau, the county has a total area of 873 square miles (2,260 km^{2}), of which 869 square miles (2,250 km^{2}) is land and 4.9 square miles (13 km^{2}) (0.6%) is water. It is part of the Palouse, a wide and rolling prairie-like region of the middle Columbia basin.

=== Geographic features ===
- Snake River
- Blue Mountains
- Touchet River
- Tucannon River

=== Major highways ===
- U.S. Route 12

=== Adjacent counties ===
- Whitman County - north
- Garfield County - east
- Wallowa County, Oregon - southeast
- Umatilla County, Oregon - southwest
- Walla Walla County - west
- Franklin County - northwest

=== National protected area ===
- Umatilla National Forest (part)

== Demographics ==
Historical population
Census	Pop.	Note	%±
1880	7,103		—
1890	6,709		−5.5%
1900	7,128		6.2%
1910	7,042		−1.2%
1920	6,093		−13.5%
1930	5,325		−12.6%
1940	5,549		4.2%
1950	4,860		−12.4%
1960	4,569		−6.0%
1970	4,439		−2.8%
1980	4,057		−8.6%
1990	4,027		−0.7%
2000	4,064		0.9%
2010	4,078		0.3%
2020	3,952		−3.1%
2025 (est.)	4,141	▲	4.8%
U.S. Decennial Census; 1790–1960 1900–1990; 1990–2000 2010–2020

=== 2020 census ===
As of the 2020 census, the county had a population of 3,952.

Of the residents, 17.1% were under the age of 18 and 29.0% were 65 years of age or older; the median age was 52.7 years. For every 100 females there were 98.6 males, and for every 100 females age 18 and over there were 97.8 males.

0.0% of residents lived in urban areas and 100.0% lived in rural areas.

Columbia County, Washington – Racial and ethnic composition Note: the US Census treats Hispanic/Latino as an ethnic category. This table excludes Latinos from the racial categories and assigns them to a separate category. Hispanics/Latinos may be of any race.
Race / Ethnicity (NH = Non-Hispanic)	Pop 2000	Pop 2010	Pop 2020	% 2000	% 2010	% 2020
White alone (NH)	3,685	3,649	3,347	90.67%	89.48%	84.69%
Black or African American alone (NH)	9	12	6	0.22%	0.29%	0.15%
Native American or Alaska Native alone (NH)	34	47	41	0.84%	1.15%	1.04%
Asian alone (NH)	16	23	21	0.39%	0.56%	0.53%
Pacific Islander alone (NH)	2	14	0	0.05%	0.34%	0.00%
Other race alone (NH)	0	9	18	0.00%	0.22%	0.46%
Mixed race or Multiracial (NH)	60	70	215	1.48%	1.72%	5.44%
Hispanic or Latino (any race)	258	254	304	6.35%	6.23%	7.69%
Total	4,064	4,078	3,952	100.00%	100.00%	100.00%

The racial makeup of the county was 87.1% White, 0.3% Black or African American, 1.3% American Indian and Alaska Native, 0.6% Asian, 3.0% from some other race, and 7.8% from two or more races. Hispanic or Latino residents of any race comprised 7.7% of the population.

There were 1,765 households in the county, of which 20.8% had children under the age of 18 living with them and 25.3% had a female householder with no spouse or partner present. About 31.8% of all households were made up of individuals and 17.1% had someone living alone who was 65 years of age or older.

There were 2,190 housing units, of which 19.4% were vacant. Among occupied housing units, 72.8% were owner-occupied and 27.2% were renter-occupied. The homeowner vacancy rate was 2.6% and the rental vacancy rate was 7.1%.

=== 2010 census ===
As of the 2010 census, there were 4,078 people, 1,762 households, and 1,156 families living in the county. The population density was 4.7 inhabitants per square mile (1.8/km^{2}). There were 2,136 housing units at an average density of 2.5 units per square mile (0.97 units/km^{2}). The racial makeup of the county was 93.0% white, 1.4% American Indian, 0.6% Asian, 0.3% Pacific islander, 0.3% black or African American, 1.7% from other races, and 2.7% from two or more races. Those of Hispanic or Latino origin made up 6.2% of the population. In terms of ancestry, 24.7% were German, 18.3% were English, 12.3% were Irish, and 7.0% were American.

Of the 1,762 households, 24.7% had children under the age of 18 living with them, 52.6% were married couples living together, 9.2% had a female householder with no husband present, 34.4% were non-families, and 29.3% of all households were made up of individuals. The average household size was 2.27 and the average family size was 2.76. The median age was 48.3 years.

The median income for a household in the county was $43,611 and the median income for a family was $53,452. Males had a median income of $45,000 versus $35,357 for females. The per capita income for the county was $25,810. About 9.8% of families and 16.4% of the population were below the poverty line, including 19.7% of those under age 18 and 10.9% of those age 65 or over.

=== 2000 census ===
As of the 2000 census, there were 4,064 people, 1,687 households, and 1,138 families living in the county. The population density was 5 people per square mile (1.9 people/km^{2}). There were 2,018 housing units at an average density of 2 units per square mile (0.77 units/km^{2}). The racial makeup of the county was 93.73% White, 0.22% Black or African American, 0.96% Native American, 0.42% Asian, 0.05% Pacific Islander, 2.73% from other races, and 1.89% from two or more races. 6.35% of the population were Hispanic or Latino of any race. 19.6% were of German, 18.2% United States or American, 14.3% English and 8.3% Irish ancestry. 94.3% spoke English and 5.7% Spanish at home.

There were 1,687 households, out of which 27.70% had children under the age of 18 living with them, 56.00% were married couples living together, 8.50% had a female householder with no husband present, and 32.50% were non-families. 29.00% of all households were made up of individuals, and 13.00% had someone living alone who was 65 years of age or older. The average household size was 2.36 and the average family size was 2.89.

In the county, the population was spread out, with 23.90% under the age of 18, 7.00% from 18 to 24, 22.80% from 25 to 44, 27.70% from 45 to 64, and 18.50% who were 65 years of age or older. The median age was 42 years. For every 100 females there were 95.20 males. For every 100 females age 18 and over, there were 94.80 males.

The median income for a household in the county was $33,500, and the median income for a family was $44,038. Males had a median income of $33,690 versus $21,367 for females. The per capita income for the county was $17,374. About 8.60% of families and 12.60% of the population were below the poverty line, including 15.90% of those under age 18 and 11.10% of those age 65 or over.

== Communities ==
=== City ===
- Dayton (county seat)

=== Town ===
- Starbuck

=== Unincorporated communities ===
- Covello, Washington
- Jackson, Washington
- Huntsville
- Marengo
- Turner

=== Ghost towns ===
- Grange City, Washington

== Politics ==
United States presidential election results for Columbia County, Washington
Year	Republican		Democratic		Third party(ies)	
Year	No.	%	No.	%	No.	%
1892	615	39.30%	672	42.94%	278	17.76%
1896	776	47.00%	862	52.21%	13	0.79%
1900	899	54.72%	706	42.97%	38	2.31%
1904	1,089	65.72%	482	29.09%	86	5.19%
1908	887	57.41%	585	37.86%	73	4.72%
1912	673	26.25%	855	33.35%	1,036	40.41%
1916	1,148	46.91%	1,164	47.57%	135	5.52%
1920	1,376	64.18%	662	30.88%	106	4.94%
1924	1,122	52.11%	522	24.25%	509	23.64%
1928	1,328	65.07%	689	33.76%	24	1.18%
1932	714	31.07%	1,491	64.88%	93	4.05%
1936	807	33.46%	1,391	57.67%	214	8.87%
1940	1,461	54.41%	1,218	45.36%	6	0.22%
1944	1,211	53.35%	1,039	45.77%	20	0.88%
1948	1,062	50.28%	1,015	48.06%	35	1.66%
1952	1,511	66.18%	765	33.51%	7	0.31%
1956	1,423	65.82%	739	34.18%	0	0.00%
1960	1,301	62.13%	793	37.87%	0	0.00%
1964	1,048	47.92%	1,138	52.03%	1	0.05%
1968	1,221	56.74%	754	35.04%	177	8.22%
1972	1,445	69.47%	533	25.63%	102	4.90%
1976	1,153	56.69%	829	40.76%	52	2.56%
1980	1,349	64.67%	587	28.14%	150	7.19%
1984	1,404	67.02%	673	32.12%	18	0.86%
1988	1,172	60.29%	730	37.55%	42	2.16%
1992	761	39.76%	668	34.90%	485	25.34%
1996	948	48.49%	743	38.01%	264	13.50%
2000	1,523	72.28%	515	24.44%	69	3.27%
2004	1,470	69.77%	605	28.71%	32	1.52%
2008	1,499	67.28%	686	30.79%	43	1.93%
2012	1,568	69.41%	645	28.55%	46	2.04%
2016	1,497	67.16%	526	23.60%	206	9.24%
2020	1,754	70.30%	668	26.77%	73	2.93%
2024	1,737	69.90%	661	26.60%	87	3.50%

Columbia County is one of the most conservative counties in Washington state. It has not been carried by a Democrat for President since Lyndon Johnson's 1964 landslide victory. The last time it backed a Democrat for Governor was in 1936 when conservative Democrat Clarence D. Martin swept every county in the state and the last Democratic Senator was "Scoop" Jackson, who carried the county in five consecutive county sweeps (the last in 1982).

== Education ==
=== Schools ===
School districts including parts of the county are:

- Dayton School District
- Pomeroy School District
- Prescott School District
- Starbuck School District
- Waitsburg School District

=== Library ===
The Columbia County Rural Library District operates a library in Dayton. People living in Dayton are in the library's taxation base, but not in the library's voting base; the voting area for the library only consists of unincorporated areas. The library was established in 1919 as a small reading room while a women's civics club fundraised for a permanent building. The raised funds were transferred to the Dayton city government in 1935 and used to construct a public library in 1937 using New Deal funding; the building was later expanded in 1947. It is the only public library in Columbia County. A November 2023 ballot measure proposes to close the rural library district, and therefore the library itself, entirely due to the placement and availability of children's books on racial issues and LGBT topics. The library collection would be received by the Washington State Library if the rural library district is dissolved.

== See also ==
- National Register of Historic Places listings in Columbia County, Washington
