= N. B. Atkinson =

American politician

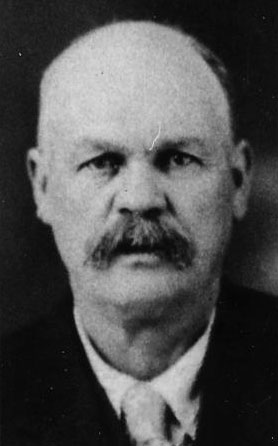
- Atkinson in 1919

Member of the Washington House of Representatives for the 13th district
- In office 1919–1923

Personal details
- Born: January 15, 1859 Missouri, United States
- Died: October 31, 1950 (aged 91) Waitsburg, Washington, United States
- Party: Republican

Napoleon B. Atkinson (January 15, 1859 – October 31, 1950) was an American politician in the state of Washington. He served in the Washington House of Representatives.
