= The Chehalis Nugget =

Newspaper in Chehalis, Washington

- Type: Daily, weekly newspaper
- Format: Broadsheet
- Owner(s): Albert Tozier and H.C. Mayfield (founders), W.W. Robertson (final owner)
- Publisher: Advocate Publishing Co.
- Original name: The Lewis County Nugget
- Founded: July 18, 1883
- Ceased publication: November 28, 1898
- Relaunched: As the Chehalis Bee-Nugget, 1898
- Language: English
- City: Chehalis, Washington
- Country: United States
- Circulation: 1000 (as of 1898)
- Sister newspapers: The Chehalis Bee
- OCLC number: 17560772
- Free online archives: Lewis County Nugget OCLC - 17315630

The Chehalis Nugget was a weekly newspaper published and circulated in Chehalis, Washington. The Nugget was originally known as the Lewis County Nugget and was the first newspaper organized and published in the city. The first issue was printed and circulated on July 14, 1883. The Chehalis Nugget may have been one of the first weekly newspapers in Washington state to use a typesetting machine.

The Lewis County Nugget was founded by H.C. Mayfield and Albert Tozier. The newspapermen were originally attempting to begin a paper in Chehalis County but the shipment of their machinery was incorrectly shipped to the city of Chehalis. Mayfield and Tozier decided to "let well enough alone" and began their endeavor in the city instead. Ownership or stakes in the paper changed frequently in the late 1880s and into the 1890s; the final owner was Colonel W.W. Robertson.

Competing newspapers in Chehalis included The Chehalis Bee, the predominant paper in the city, and The People's Advocate.

The Nugget was sold to Dan Bush, owner and editor of The Chehalis Bee, in November 1898. The sale combined the two competing newspapers into The Chehalis Bee-Nugget.

== History ==
=== Beginnings ===
The Chehalis Nugget was the first newspaper organized and published in Chehalis and was originally known as the Lewis County Nugget. The inaugural issue was printed on July 14, 1883. (Note: In 1919, the Siler family, of Siler, Washington, donated an original copy of the first editions of the Lewis County Bee and Lewis County Nugget to the city's Carnegie library as part of the facility's permanent collection.)

The founders of the Lewis County Nugget were H.C. Mayfield (Note: No sourcing has yet been found that lists Mayfield's first name.) and Albert Tozier, an Oregonian newspaperman who once was editor of the Hillsboro Independent based in Hillsboro, Oregon. Mayfield and Tozier had originally planned to open a newspaper in Chehalis County, Washington. Due to an error in the shipping of typesetting equipment, which was sent to the city of Chehalis instead, the pair opted into opening a newspaper in the town "after looking over the field" and deciding to "let well enough alone". With no planned moniker for their upstart paper, Mayfield and Tozier visited a local sawmill where a mechanic had engraved blocks of wood that spelled out, "The Chehalis Nugget". (Note: The story regarding the moniker of the Chehalis Nugget is potentially apocryphal, as the paper had already been named the Lewis County Nugget. See sources within the article for the discrepancy.)

Now hoping that we may prosper, that Lewis County may be more prosperous, and that the paper will give general satisfaction, we ask you to assist us in circulating Lewis County's first newspaper."

— Owners, H.C. Mayfield and Albert Tozier,
First issue of the Lewis County Nugget, July 14, 1883

The first issue was four pages, (Note: In a brief report on the first issue of the Lewis County Bee from the Seattle Post-Intelligencer on June 10, 1884, the article mentioned the first edition to be eight pages in length.) containing seven columns, and included some national coverage and news in Chehalis. Facts about the founding of Lewis County, as well as a list of national, state, and local leaders, were included. Local news included a house fire in Adna and the obituary of 28-year old Clark Barton, a state resident who was born in the county. The middle pages were printed by a "patents inside" company in Portland, Oregon. A half-page, real estate ad, taken out by the "Mother of Chehalis", Elizabeth "Eliza" Saunders Barrett, was placed on the front page. Barrett purchased additional space to advertise her hotel; the hotel later became the Tynan Opera House.

The first issue was given to Lewis Davis, pioneer of Claquato; the newspaper held an auction and Davis won with a bid of $1.50, equivalent to $52 in 2025. The first person to subscribe to the Nugget, and thus the first to do so for any newspaper in Chehalis, was prominent Chehalis businessman, H.J. Duffy.

The newspaper featured Brevier font and nonpareil typography during the first years; the first typesetting was done by Charles Shepherd, an employee of the Chehalis Flouring Mill.

=== Ownership and location changes ===
Initially, the Nugget office was located at the corner of Prindle Street and State Avenue. The location, which was next to a saloon, was noted to be one of the many "firsts" in Chehalis, hosting at certain points the first doctor's office, hotel, and millinery shop. Near the early beginnings of the Nugget, the publication was once shut down after a hog ate an ink roller, leading the newspaper unable to produce for two weeks. Tozier had cleaned the roller of the hand press and left it in an open doorway to dry. The part was reported as "almost completely devoured". (Note: The date of the hog-eating incident is not specifically mentioned in reports. See sources in the section.)

A part owner of the paper was Chehalis postmaster, J.E. Willis; he sold his stake to J.L Russell in 1886. Frank Owen, previously of the Chehalis Bee, purchased the Nugget in December 1889. By 1891, the owner was A.E. Partridge who sold the business that year to two men known as "Messrs. Robinson & Morden". The last owner of the Nugget was Colonel W.W. Robertson, who bought an interest in the newspaper in 1892. Robertson was a Pacific Northwest newspaperman known for his management of the Yakima Daily Republic and Yakima Herald. In 1972, he became the first journalist to be selected to the newly established "State Hall of Journalistic Achievement" at Washington State University. The colonel sold his stake to C.M. Steadman by February 1895, only to reacquire the newspaper four months later in June.

The newspaper was reported, by March 1892, to have "absorbed" a competing newspaper in the city known as The Register. (Note: No sourcing on The Register, believed to be located in Chehalis or perhaps the nearby area, has been found.) The Chehalis Nugget was noted in July 1895 to most likely be the first "country weekly" newspaper in the state to use a typesetting machine.

=== Publication ceases ===
Colonel Robertson sold the Nugget to Dan Bush of the Chehalis Bee on November 1, 1898. The sale combined the two competing newspapers into the Chehalis Bee-Nugget. The transaction was officially completed on November 28, 1898 for a price of $2,400, equivalent to $92,880 in 2025, which included all Nugget holdings and machinery.

The city's other newspaper, The People's Advocate, theorized that Robertson's reasons to sell the Nugget was that he had tired of the financial and political pendulum of "starvation and damnation" in the competitive newspaper market. The Advocate considered the "demise" of the Nugget as "natural" and the paper's "day was done" and it had "run its course". (Note: The People's Advocate's criticism of the management of the Chehalis Nugget after its announced merger was pointed, referring to ownership as "freaks" and hoping that the Nugget's "ashes scatter to the four winds". A column of criticism in a following Advocate edition, containing editorials from the Centralia Chronicle and Centralia News, continued to mock the end of the Nugget, stating that no "regrets will be noted" and the paper was of "no influence". Harsh words were used to describe Colonel Robertson, referring to him as "unprincipled" and his attempts in opinion and political leanings, a "failure".)

== Recognition and criticism ==
In 1883, the Waitsburg Times wrote that the Chehalis Nugget should "take the cake" on its "originality, prolixity and verbrasity", highlighting a published travel story about a trip to the "San Wan Islands" where the beauty of the land and its people were written in verbose terms for the "benefit of the nimrods of Baw Faw". (Note: The use of the term, nimrod, in this case is more likely to be a compliment of sorts, pre-dating the pejorative meaning of the word from the mid-20th century.) The paper was accused in 1887 by the Washington Standard of having the "ex-officio privilege" of choosing the nominees of the Democratic party in Washington. The accusation was based on the Nugget's editors allegedly having access to postal cards delivered to the Chehalis post office.

The editors of the first issue of The People's Advocate referred to the Nugget as being led by "hackneyed sarcasm" and wished the newspaper "condolences" as Nugget readers were believed to become subscribers of the Advocate. By 1895, the Nugget was noted by the Seattle Post-Intelligencer to be "one of the most readable papers" in Washington state. The following year in July, the Salt Lake Tribune considered the Nugget to be a "wretched little newspaper" and questioned when the writing staff left the "reservation". Referring to the writers as "salmon-eating, lobster-catching, crab-advancing, clam-eaters", the commentary was due to the Nugget's contrary viewpoint against the state of Utah wanting silver to be used in United States coinage. The Washington Standard referred to the Nugget in August 1896 as a "blatant goldbug" and "without honor" for denouncing a political attempt to thwart the gold standard by a political nominee in Pierce County.

The Pe Ell Examiner wrote in December 1898, after the end of the Nugget's publication, that the Chehalis Bee would be "handicapped by an honor" by hyphenating the Nugget to its name. Robertson was considered more than any other journalist in the state to be "independent...consciencious [sic]...indefatigable" in doing what was correct.

== See also ==
- List of newspapers in Washington (state)
