= The Chehalis Advocate =

Former newspaper in Chehalis, Washington

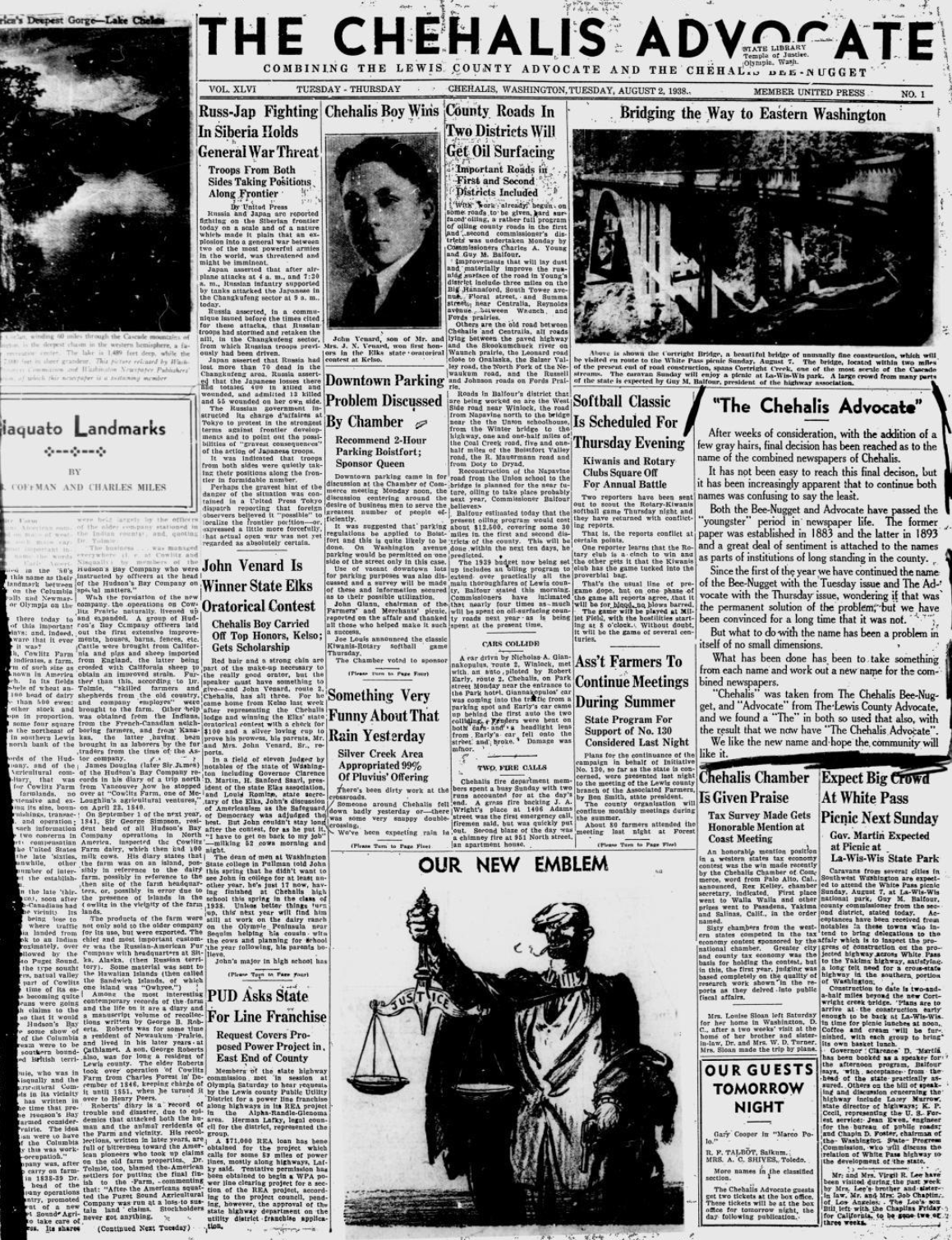
- First official edition of the Chehalis Advocate, August 2, 1938
- Type: Daily, weekly newspaper
- Format: Broadsheet
- Owner: W.R. Ingraham (final owner)
- Prior names: The People's Advocate, The Lewis County Advocate
- Founded: October 7, 1892 (People's Advocate)
- Ceased publication: April 12, 1962
- Political alignment: Populist Party (People's Advocate)
- Language: English
- City: Chehalis, Washington
- Country: United States
- Circulation: 744 (People's Advocate) (as of 1898)
- Price: $1.25 annual subscription (People's Advocate, 1898)
- OCLC number: 17560793
- Free online archives: People's Advocate OCLC - 17315587, Lewis County Advocate OCLC - 17315604

The Chehalis Advocate was a weekly newspaper published and circulated in Chehalis, Washington. The Advocate originally began as The People's Advocate and later as The Lewis County Advocate.

The People's Advocate, a newspaper with an open affiliation with the Populist Party, began with a first issue printed on October 7, 1892. Ownership included I.P. Callison, of I.P. Callison's & Sons mint factory, and throughout most of its existence, proclaimed that the Advocate was the leading newspaper in Chehalis, despite contrary circulation numbers. After support of the political party began to wane, the publication briefly ceased at the turn of the 20th century and was restarted under the nameplate, The Lewis County Advocate, in February 1902.

Under the Lewis County Advocate moniker, the newspaper began the Advocate Publishing Company in 1907. Ownership changed several times and the paper facilitated between daily and weekly printings. During the early 1930s, the newspaper refused to accept or publish advertising for alcohol and cigarettes, an anomaly at the time due to the risk of losing significant advertising revenue.

The paper officially became The Chehalis Advocate on August 2, 1938, after it merged with The Chehalis Bee-Nugget the prior year. The publishers choose the new name simply by combining the two monikers together and adding the word, "the", as both newspaper's nameplates contained its usage.

Competing newspapers during the three different forms of the Advocate included The Chehalis Bee and The Chehalis Nugget, and its merged form, The Chehalis Bee-Nugget.

The Chehalis Advocate ceased publication with its final issue printed on April 12, 1962. The closure was due to a loss of revenue. The announcement in the paper ended with the journalistic marker, "-30-". The Advocate Printing Company remained in business but the loss of the Advocate ended a continuous 79-year run of Chehalis newspapers since the first issue of The Lewis County Nugget in 1883. As of 2026, Chehalis has remained without a city-produced newspaper.

== History ==
=== The People's Advocate ===
The People's Advocate's first issue was printed on October 7, 1892 (Note: The People's Advocate was commonly referred to as the Chehalis Advocate in news reports around the turn of the 20th century decades before it officially became the mid-20th century Chehalis Advocate. See sourcing throughout the article.) and was a "reform newspaper" that had an open affiliation with the Populist Party, also known as the People's Party. The Advocate was the official newspaper of a farmers association. The "exciting and upbeat" weekly was issued on Fridays and provided political commentary as well as some local, state, and national news reports. The newspaper was reported to have "appealed to an intelligent readership". An annual subscription cost $1.25 and circulation is estimated to have reached several hundred but consistent, official publishing numbers have been found lacking. (Note: A circulation report in 1899 noted 744 subscriptions for the People's Advocate.)

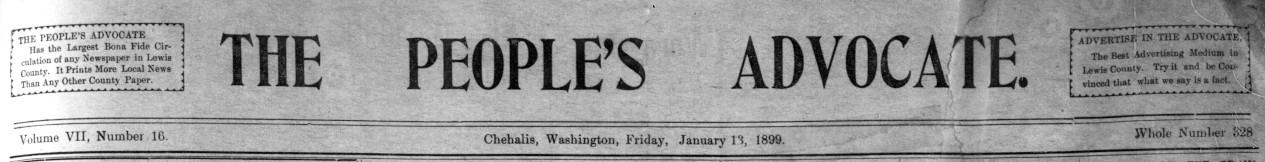
Nameplate, The People's Advocate, 1899

The newspaper became more independent by the end of 1896 and was purchased by I.P. Callison, of I.P. Callison's & Sons mint factory, in 1897, where it was considered the "official local paper" for a time. (Note: The Chehalis Bee-Nugget, in response to the People's Advocate self-claim to be "the largest bona fide circulation of any Lewis County newspaper", offered a public payment of $10 to the Advocate if it could prove the statement. The Bee-Nugget also offered to cover the costs associated with an investigation to find the "exact truth as to the circulation of the two papers". A report on circulation numbers in 1899 showed the Bee-Nugget had outpaced the Advocate by more than 5,000.) Interest and power in the Populist Party began to wane by the end of the 1890s and a loss of advertising revenue forced the closure of the paper; the final issue was December 21, 1900. The cessation of the People's Advocate occurred without any prior notice.

=== The Lewis County Advocate ===
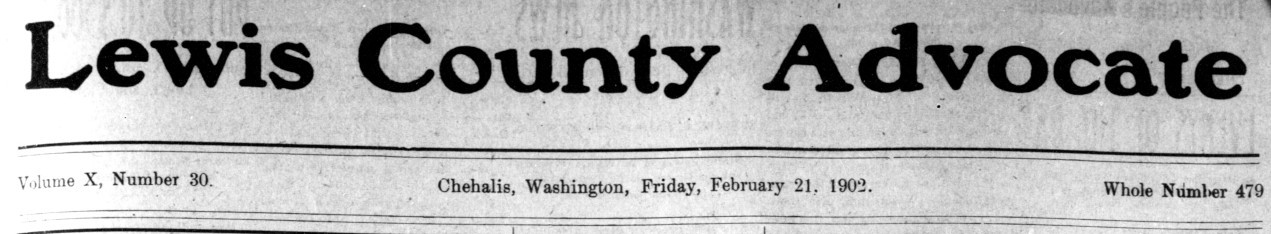
First nameplate, Lewis County Advocate, February 1902

On February 21, 1902, the first edition of the Lewis County Advocate was published as a continuance of The People's Advocate. A notice of a name change was printed in the inaugural issue informing readers and subscribers of the new moniker. In 1907, the Advocate Publishing Company was established and handled all printing of the newspaper. Still under ownership of Callison, who partnered with his brother, Robert, the paper was located in the downtown core on Market Street at the property of the Rainier Hotel, next to the post office. The Advocate office moved in April 1920 to Park Street. In June 1926, the newspaper changed location again, occupying an office space at the back of a newly constructed building on Market Street.

The Callison brothers remained owners until 1905. A following owner of the paper was the Giblin & Drummond Company; Drummond sold his stake in 1907 to another incorporated business. Newspaperman Elmer McBroom purchased an outstanding share of the paper in 1907. McBroom succeeded Dan W. Bush of The Chehalis Bee-Nugget as the city's postmaster. McBroom sold the paper in April 1918 to J.H. Hurley, an Oregon newspaperman, and O.H. Skotheim, who has previously worked for Canadian Pacific Railway. Ownership was later transferred to C.A. Dool, who sold his interest in the newspaper to George B. Hayden (Note: News reports sometimes use the initials "J.P." in mentioning George Hayden.) who had previously owned Dool's stock in the company.

The Lewis County Advocate announced in early 1933 that the paper would no longer accept advertising from cigarette companies. A rarity at the time, the editor, Chapin Foster, stated that continuing to do so would "fasten the habit on the youth of America" and mentioned the paper had no regrets in its decision despite the loss of revenue. In addition, the Advocate would refuse any future advertising for liquor after the end of Prohibition in the United States later that year.

In February 1934, the Lewis County Advocate filed for articles of incorporation. The newspaper company was valued at $25,000, equivalent to $601,679 in 2025, and the paperwork listed Chapin and Mary Foster as owners along with Hayden.

=== The Chehalis Advocate ===
The first issue of the Chehalis Advocate was August 2, 1938. The newspaper was formed out of the merger between the Chehalis Bee-Nugget and the Lewis County Advocate in 1937. For a time after the merge, the paper switched between using the Bee-Nugget and Advocate names between editions. The editors printed a column on the front page explaining that a unified new name, combining "Chehalis" and "Advocate", was a better solution and would end any confusion. "The" was added to the title simply because the word existed in both previous names.

The Chehalis Advocate, as part of an ongoing practice of the Chehalis Bee-Nugget, continued in the late-1930s to present an annual most valuable player trophy to a member of the Chehalis high school football team. In April 1940, the city of Chehalis held a "special ladies' day" where woman in the community took over duties of various city offices, including the mayor. As part of the event, the Advocate was run by a Mrs. Dudley Gaylord, who was to "invade the office" of the newspaper and "show the publishers how a paper ought to be published". (Note: Most of the women listed in the April 1940 news article of a "special ladies' day" were given their husband's first name.)

Because

It is the only populist paper in this part of the state and deserves your support. It teaches the principles of genuine populism first, last and all the time.

— The People's Advocate,
Second of four reasons to subscribe to The People's Advocate, October 27, 1897

A long-running religious column, known as "Right From The Heart", was featured in the Advocate from the late-1930s and 1940s. The column was revived in the Centralia newspaper, The Daily Chronicle, in June 1974. Providing commentary on the importance of churches, the one-time occasion was in honor of the 75th anniversary of the Chehalis First Christian Church.

In response to a Life Magazine report in the March 6, 1939 issue about fascism in the United States that included a two-page section about such activity in Chehalis, Advocate editor Chapin Foster wrote a letter to the editor to remark that the publications statements were "untrue and grossly unfair". Foster wrote that the city contained numerous organizations and different types of people that proved Chehalis was a "wholesome backbone city". He responded further, mentioning core educational and religious values in the community, and considered the history of Chehalis to be an "open book" that reflected the "best in American life".

Hayden printed the publication as a daily for a brief time between August 1948 and April 1949. The Advocate switched back to a weekly publication under Ron (W.R.) Ingraham, who took ownership of the company in 1949.

In the April 12, 1962 issue, the Chehalis Advocate announced that the publishing company was ceasing operations of the newspaper. The notice was ended with "-30-", a traditional journalistic marker for the end of a story during the editing or typesetting stages of publishing. The owner, Ingraham, stated that revenues had "failed to keep up with rising costs" associated with the publishing of a newspaper and a continuance of the Advocate was "inadvisable". The Advocate Printing Company, responsible for the printing of the newspaper, was to remain in business, focusing on commercial printing and office supplies.

The cessation of the Chehalis Advocate ended a continuous 79-year run of Chehalis newspapers since the first issue of the Lewis County Nugget in 1883. The city has remained without a city-produced newspaper. Local news reports for the residents of Chehalis are provided by The Chronicle, a weekly newspaper published in Centralia.

== Recognition and criticism ==
Over editorial disagreement over the Philippines and successes during the Spanish-American War, the Seattle Post-Intelligencer referred to the People's Advocate in May 1899 as a "dyspeptic contemporary", gloomy yet "fierce" in their written opinions. Two months later, the Post-Intelligencer gave the Advocate the nickname, "Calamity Howler from Howlville".

In May 1909 at a city council meeting, Giblin made a motion that was approved to declare the Advocate the "official newspaper" of Chehalis.

The Chehalis Bee-Nugget acknowledged under the Giblin and Drummond ownership that the competing newspaper was an "obliging and an agreeable competitor" and in 1925, considered the Lewis County Advocate a "lusty younger brother". Two years later, the Bee-Nugget considered the Advocate to be "one of the outstanding" newspapers in Washington, and was an integral part of "making our common community a better place to live".

In 1928, both the Bee-Nugget and the Lewis County Advocate strongly condemned the actions of the Seattle Chamber of Commerce for sending out a press release taking credit for the record-breaking World's Largest Strawberry Shortcake held at Alexander Park in Chehalis. The chamber's press release had been sent via news wire. The Advocate's reporting was noted to be "intensely bitter", writing that the chamber could stop "this petty thievery" of other community's efforts and suggested the shortcake incident a good example of "why the rest of Washington fears and hates" the city of Seattle. The chamber of commerce later sent a letter of regret to the mayor of Chehalis for the incident.

The Chehalis Times wrote in 1981 that the Chehalis Advocate was the "sole newspaper voice" for Chehalis during its run.

== See also ==
- List of newspapers in Washington (state)
