= The Chehalis Bee =

Former newspaper in Chehalis, Washington

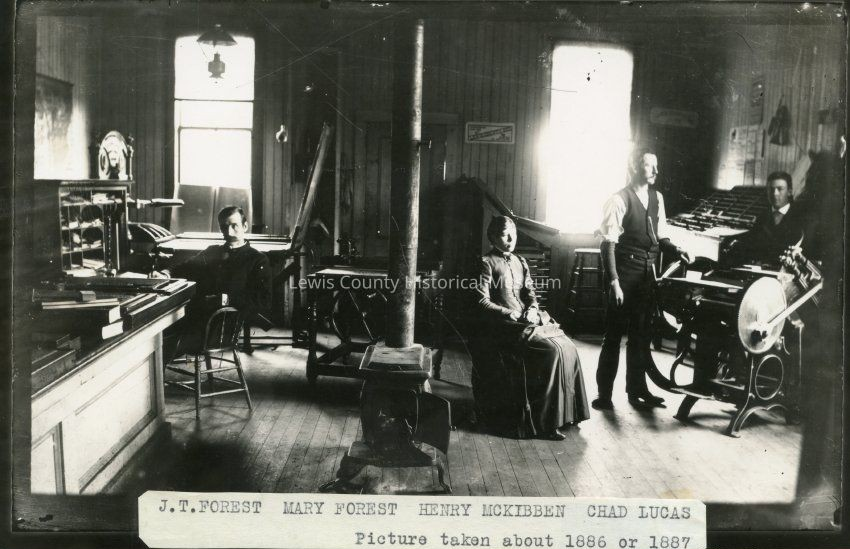
- Office of the Lewis County Bee, c. 1886
- Type: Daily, weekly newspaper
- Format: Broadsheet
- Owner(s): G.M. Bull and William W. Francis (founders), Dan W. Bush (final owner)
- Original name: The Lewis County Bee
- Founded: June 6, 1884
- Ceased publication: November 28, 1898
- Relaunched: As the Chehalis Bee-Nugget, 1898
- Language: English
- City: Chehalis, Washington
- Country: United States
- Circulation: 4980 (as of 1898)
- Sister newspapers: The Chehalis Nugget
- OCLC number: 17560793
- Free online archives: Lewis County Bee OCLC - 17315622

The Chehalis Bee was a weekly newspaper published and circulated in Chehalis, Washington. The Bee was originally known as the Lewis County Bee and was the second newspaper organized and published in the city after The Lewis County Nugget. The first issue of the Bee was printed and circulated on June 6, 1884. The nameplate was changed in 1888.

The Lewis County Bee was founded by G.M. Bull and William W. Francis. Ownership or stakes in the paper changed frequently in the late 1880s. Judd Bush purchased the Bee in 1889; his brother, Dan W. Bush, was the editor and became the full, and last, owner in 1891. During the 1890s, the Bee published several special blue and red inked issues.

Competing newspapers in Chehalis included The Chehalis Nugget, the second-leading paper in the city, and The People's Advocate.

Dan Bush purchased the Nugget in November 1898 and combined the two competing newspapers into The Chehalis Bee-Nugget.

== History ==
=== Beginnings ===
The Chehalis Bee, originally known as the Lewis County Bee, was published from 1884 into November 1898. The first issue of the Lewis County Bee was printed and circulated on June 6, 1884. (Note: In 1919, the Siler family, of Siler, Washington, donated an original copy of the first editions of the Lewis County Bee and Lewis County Nugget to the city's Carnegie library as part of the facility's permanent collection.) Editions varied between dailies and weeklies, often in morning editions. An annual subscription cost $1.50.

The Lewis County Bee began under the proprietorship of G.M. Bull and William W. Francis. Bull left the paper later that year; a professor, John T. Forrest (Note: John T. Forrest was possibly the namesake of the Forest, Washington community. See the article for more information.) became a part-owner in April 1886, assuming full-ownership in August.

The Lewis County Bee officially changed its moniker to the Chehalis Bee in April 1888 after Forrest sold the newspaper to W.E. Shater and W.H. Snyder. The Bee changed hands frequently afterwards, with the company sold in October 1888 to Frank Mortison and Frank H. Owens, a newspaperman who owned the Winlock Pilot and by the mid-1890s became editor of the Coast Advocate, a "not a large one" newspaper published in Half Moon Bay, California. Owens was described by The San Francisco Call as turning the Bee into the "leading country newspaper in Western Washington".

=== Bush family ownership ===
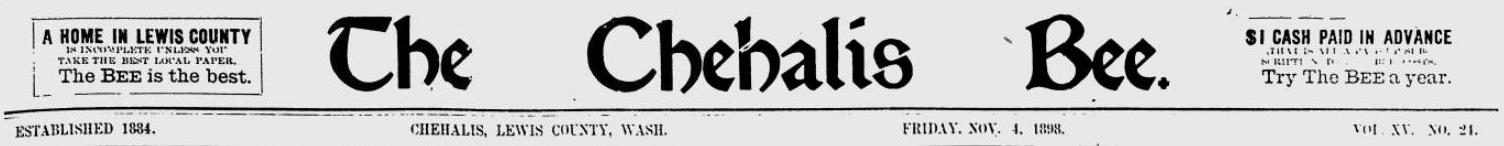
Nameplate, The Chehalis Bee, 1898

Judd C. Bush, (Note: Newspaper sources recounting the history of the Chehalis Bee and Chehalis Bee-Nugget often confuse the middle initials of the Bush brothers. See sources throughout the article for the errors.) an Illinois native who arrived in Chehalis in 1888, purchased Mortison's investment in the Bee in August 1889 and Owen's ownership later that November. He had previously been a proprietor of other newspapers, including the Sydney Telegraph located in Sidney, Nebraska.

Bush was not an active owner for long, retiring from day-to-day oversight due to "ill health" in March 1890; his brother, Dan W. Bush began management of the Chehalis Bee, serving as editor. He became the outright owner of the Bee in 1891.

A July 1885 edition, in celebrating Independence Day, contained blue ink typesetting on the second page, with red ink used on the third page. The July 4, 1888 Chehalis Bee issue was printed entirely in blue and red ink; the printer's efforts were noted by the Seattle Times to be "not less credibly" more than the usual efforts of the Bee's editor. A similar colored edition was issued in November 1896 during the 1896 United States presidential election. The blue ink was described as matching the disappointed feelings of Republican voters in the state.

=== Publication ceases ===
The Chehalis Nugget merged with the Chehalis Bee in 1898 to become The Chehalis Bee-Nugget; Dan Bush remained the owner of the new publication. (Note: In a moment of commentary from the Nebraska State Journal, the Nugget was stated to have begun as a means to "push Mr. Bush from the newspaper field" despite the former beginning a year before the Bee.) The managing editor of the Nugget was reported to have sent a "graceful" letter to their competitor, the Bee, "taking his medicine" after the sale. The transaction was officially completed on November 28, 1898, for a price of $2,400, equivalent to $92,880 in 2025, which included all Nugget holdings and machinery. Judd Bush became the editor of the Chehalis Bee-Nugget.

Early issues of the Bee had been stored for preservation in the basement of the Temple of Justice in Olympia. A collection of the Chehalis Bee, along with other publications printed before 1900, was reported by 1951 to be near a state of permanent loss. The newspapers had begun to rot and microfilming of the collection had either not been undertaken or was found to be lacking.

== Recognition and criticism ==
Four days after the first issue of the Lewis County Bee was printed, the Seattle Post-Intelligencer remarked that the Bee was "neat" and believing it could achieve the "fullest measure of success" if it were to be "true to the best interests" of its local readership.

As part of the "Twin Cities" of Centralia and Chehalis, the newspaper had a natural competition with the early version of The Chronicle. The Centralia paper, in 1889, jokingly stated that the Bee had "lost its stinger" and that readers in Lewis County had begun treating it "only as a drone". The Chronicle stated that the Chehalis Bee, if it improved, could be a valuable business and political influence in Western Washington. In 1894, the Toledo Tidings also questioned whether the Bee may "develop a sting". The Tidings referred to the newspaper as a "Republican Organette" and part of a "Republican junk club" in Chehalis.

In an anniversary editorial in 1897 marking the newspaper's 13th anniversary, the Chehalis Bee staff stated that during their control of the newspaper since 1891, the Bee had "made a few enemies" but had plans to continue the endeavor "another seven years" until they might "find something considerably better".

== See also ==
- List of newspapers in Washington (state)
