= The Chehalis Bee-Nugget =

Former newspaper in Chehalis, Washington

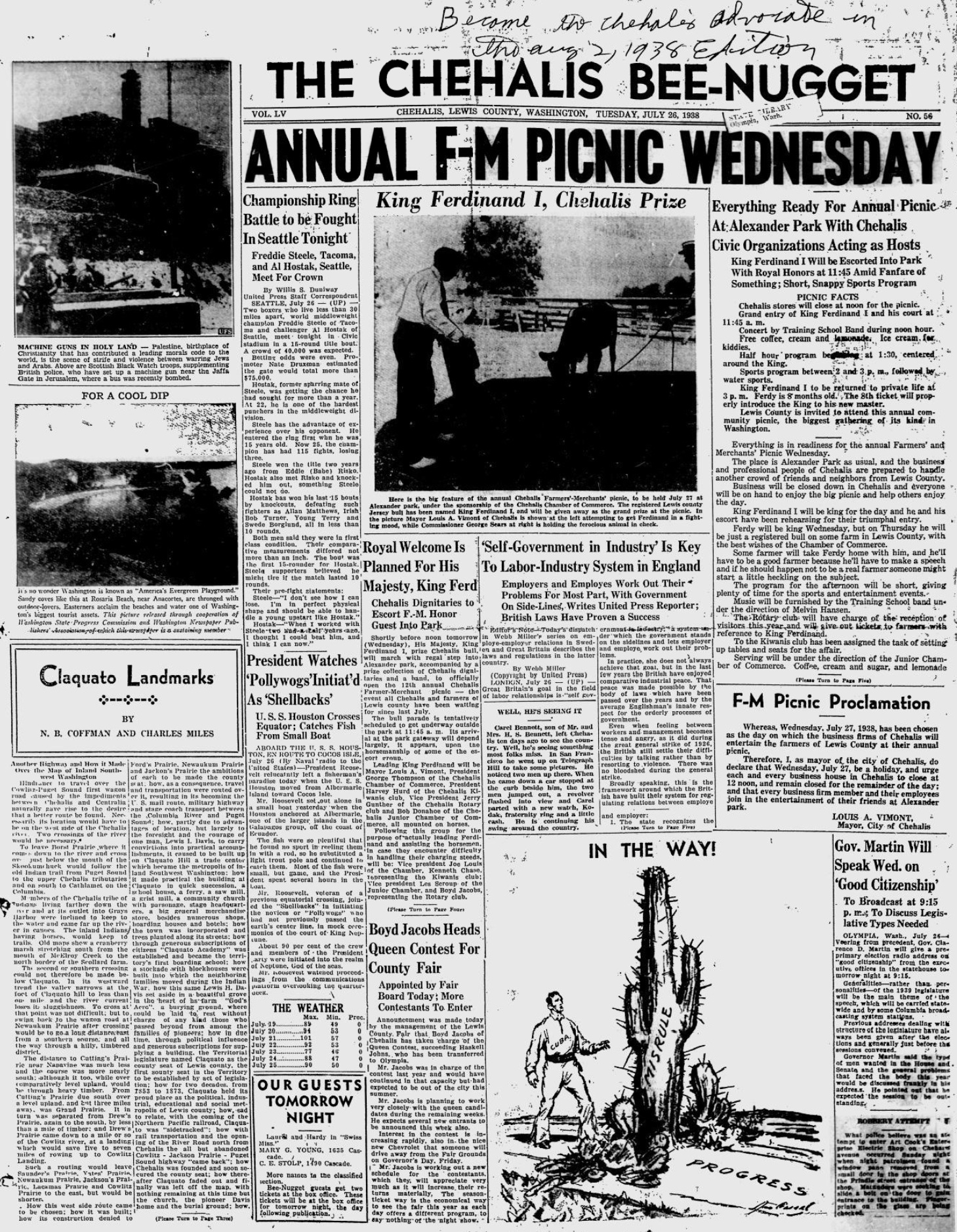
- Final edition of the Bee-Nugget, July 26, 1938
- Type: Weekly newspaper
- Format: Broadsheet
- Owner: Dan W. Bush
- Publisher: Bee Nugget Publishing
- Origin: Merging of The Chehalis Bee and The Chehalis Nugget
- Founded: November 28, 1898
- Ceased publication: 1937
- Relaunched: The Chehalis Advocate, 1938
- Language: English
- City: Chehalis, Washington (Note: The last address of the Chehalis Bee-Nugget, before it merged with the Lewis County Advocate, was 882 1/2 Market Street in the Bush building of downtown Chehalis.)
- Country: United States
- Price: $2.00 annual subscription (1931)
- Sister newspapers: The Chehalis Daily Nugget
- ISSN: 2835-3242
- OCLC number: 17560756

The Chehalis Bee-Nugget was a weekly newspaper published and circulated in Chehalis, Washington. The publication began in November 1898 after the merger of the city's first two newspapers, The Chehalis Bee and The Chehalis Nugget.

The first owner was Dan W. Bush, who as the proprietor of the Bee, purchased the Nugget for $2,400, equivalent to $92,880 in 2025. The newspaper's headquarters were located in the Bush Block of the Chehalis Downtown Historic District beginning in 1908. Bush began selling his interest in the paper in 1916 but remained as an editor and correspondent after his stock interest was entirely sold by 1921.

In 1915, the Bee-Nugget produced a souvenir book highlighting the history of the city of Chehalis, as well as past and present businesses and prominent citizens. The book was updated and republished in 2011. The newspaper held a 50th anniversary celebration at the city's St. Helens Hotel in 1932.

The Chehalis Bee-Nugget ceased publication in 1937 when the newspaper was bought that year by Advocate Publishing Company, owners of The Lewis County Advocate newspaper. The Bee-Nugget combined with the Advocate to create The Chehalis Advocate; the first official issue under the new name was printed in August 1938. The Chehalis Advocate ended in 1962.

== Background ==
The first newspaper in Lewis County was The Lewis County Nugget, published in 1883. The following year, The Lewis County Bee was first issued. Both newspapers removed the county name, switching to "Chehalis" in their nameplates.

Separate circulation numbers for the Bee and Nugget were recorded in 1898 as 4,980 and 1,000, respectively.

== History ==
The Chehalis Nugget merged with The Chehalis Bee in November 1898 to become The Chehalis Bee-Nugget. Dan W. Bush, who was owner of the Bee, remained the owner of the new publication. The transaction was officially completed on November 28, 1898 for a price of $2,400, equivalent to $92,880 in 2025, which included all Nugget holdings and machinery. Judd Bush, Dan's brother and previously an owner of the Bee, became the editor of the Chehalis Bee-Nugget.

The Chehalis Bee-Nugget moved to a new office in the Bush Block of the Chehalis Downtown Historic District in September 1908. The relocation to the Dan Bush-owned building was reported to be "permanent" though a small business office remained open at a nearby millinery shop. The offices, which included a composing room, were situated on two floors; the press room was situated in the basement. All printing of the Bee-Nugget was handled from the new location. A large fire occurred during the morning hours of August 2, 1912, beginning in the Bush Block. The fire caused damages to some of the Bee-Nugget offices located above the city's post office. (Note: At the time of the 1919 fire, the newspaper's phone number was "Black 1151". The telephone number had previously been "133" in 1900.) Damages for the newspaper were estimated to be $20,000, equivalent to $667,241 in 2025.

In 1916, Dan Bush sold a stake of the Bee-Nugget to Clarence Ellington. Bush sold his remaining ownership stock outright to Ellington in November 1921. (Note: Other reports mention that Ellington may have purchased the Bee-Nugget in 1920.) The paper was sold in 1925 to Chapin Foster.

=== The Daily Nugget ===
The Bee-Nugget began a daily newspaper known as the Chehalis Daily Nugget, was first circulated on June 8, 1911. (Note: Early reports mention that the Chehalis Daily Nugget's first edition was planned for June 1, 1911, even including a direct announcement from the Bee-Nugget.) The first issue was given to J.T. Browning, an 85-year old pioneer from Claquato. Also known as The Daily Nugget, the afternoon-edition paper was free for a limited time, "until after everyone has become aquatinted with it". The Bee-Nugget ownership believed the city to be ready for a daily publication, considering the growth and recent national publicity of the city, but noted the attempt was to be a "heavy financial burden" considering the dependence on advertising revenue that was necessary for the success of the new venture.

The paper was originally published as an evening issue and was a "six-column folio", expanded as needed. A different typeface, considered clearer and more professional, was noted to be used. In 1912, subscription options included forty cents for one month, a three or six month choice, and either $3 or $4 (equivalent to $133.45 in 2025) per year, by mail or delivery, respectively.

Before the first edition was released, the Centralia Weekly Chronicle reported that paperboys of the Bee-Nugget had enticed several Chronicle delivery boys to work for the new daily paper in Chehalis. The report also stated that this action was a standard, but questionable practice of the Bee-Nugget and their actions revealed poor conduct in the newspaper industry.

The Daily Nugget was the first to report on the November 8, 1911 fire at the city's Imperial Flour Company factory in which eight girls died. The afternoon edition covered the incident in full and the following day's print run included extra issues.

Despite a "large circle of readers", the venture lasted until February 15, 1913 when it was discontinued for a lack of advertising revenue as the newspaper did not attract the attention of local businesses as a marketing strategy. In remarks announcing the cessation, the Bee-Nugget editors mentioned that the daily had become a "burden" but expressed that the Daily Nugget was successful in avoiding yellow journalism and was meant to help bring upon the "upbuilding" of both Lewis County and the city of Chehalis. Several local or regional newspapers, including the Columbia River Sun, the Olympian, the Skamokawa Eagle, and the Toledo Messenger, wrote messages of condolences on the Daily Nugget's demise, regretting that daily papers were not a viable option for smaller cities despite the need for such.

The Daily Nugget's issues were sold on Fridays, supplanting the Chehalis Bee-Nugget's editions which shifted to Thursdays. After the end of the daily newspaper, the Bee-Nugget resumed printing on Fridays. The Bee-Nugget editors, stating their intention to use "all of our time for the present to the weekly edition of the paper", instituted news departments for education, horticulture, and poultry with additional remarks that the newspaper was to make other improvements "from time to time" for a "better and more interesting paper".

=== 50th anniversary ===
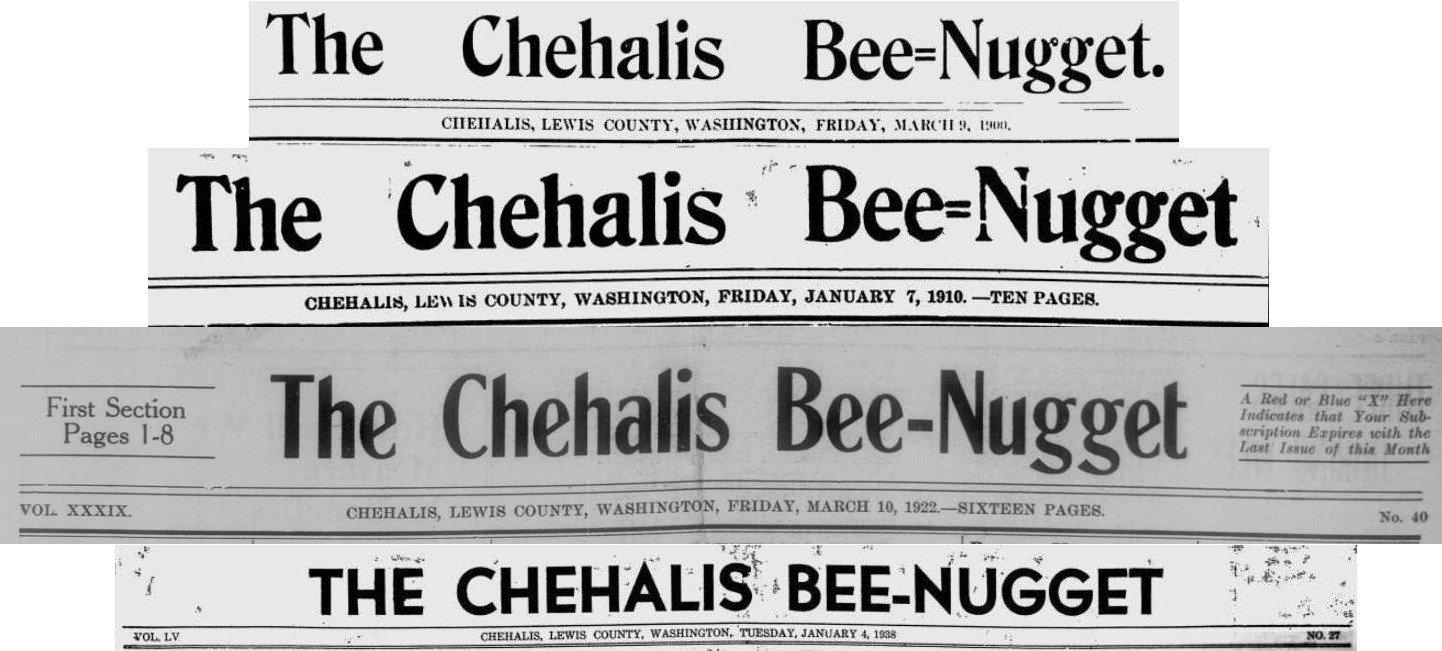
Nameplates, Chehalis Bee Nugget

The newspaper celebrated its 50th anniversary in 1932 at an event held at the city's St. Helens Hotel. The toastmaster was Mayor John West. Other speakers included prominent men in the city, as well as past and present editors of the newspaper. Dan Bush, who remained as a correspondent, recalled early pioneer days and previous owners. The founder of the Chehalis Nugget, Albert Tozier, recollected the early history of news media in the city and presented a pair of tweezers used during the first Nugget publication to the Bee-Nugget's editor, Clarence Ellington.

The Bee-Nugget noted in the lead-up to the celebration that the issue count was incorrect, listed as 52; the reason for the error was simply stated as, "someone blundered along the line".

In a column from a May 1932 edition, residents of Chehalis and the county were asked to fill out a blank form on the front page. The form included parameters for their personal information and history, as well as experiences living, working, or being of public service in the area. Of particular interest were those who lived in Chehalis or the surrounding region for more than 40 or 50 years, and anyone who had subscribed to, or were long-time readers of, the Bee or Nugget. The effort was to create an honor roll in the 50th anniversary edition, which was published as a special issue on July 15, 1932. Artifacts and early copies of both newspapers, including the first Lewis County Nugget edition, were displayed in the Chehalis Bee-Nugget office windows. The Bee-Nugget did not have a copy of the first issue of the Lewis County Bee and implored any resident who might have had a copy to loan the historical printing to the company.

=== Publication ceases ===
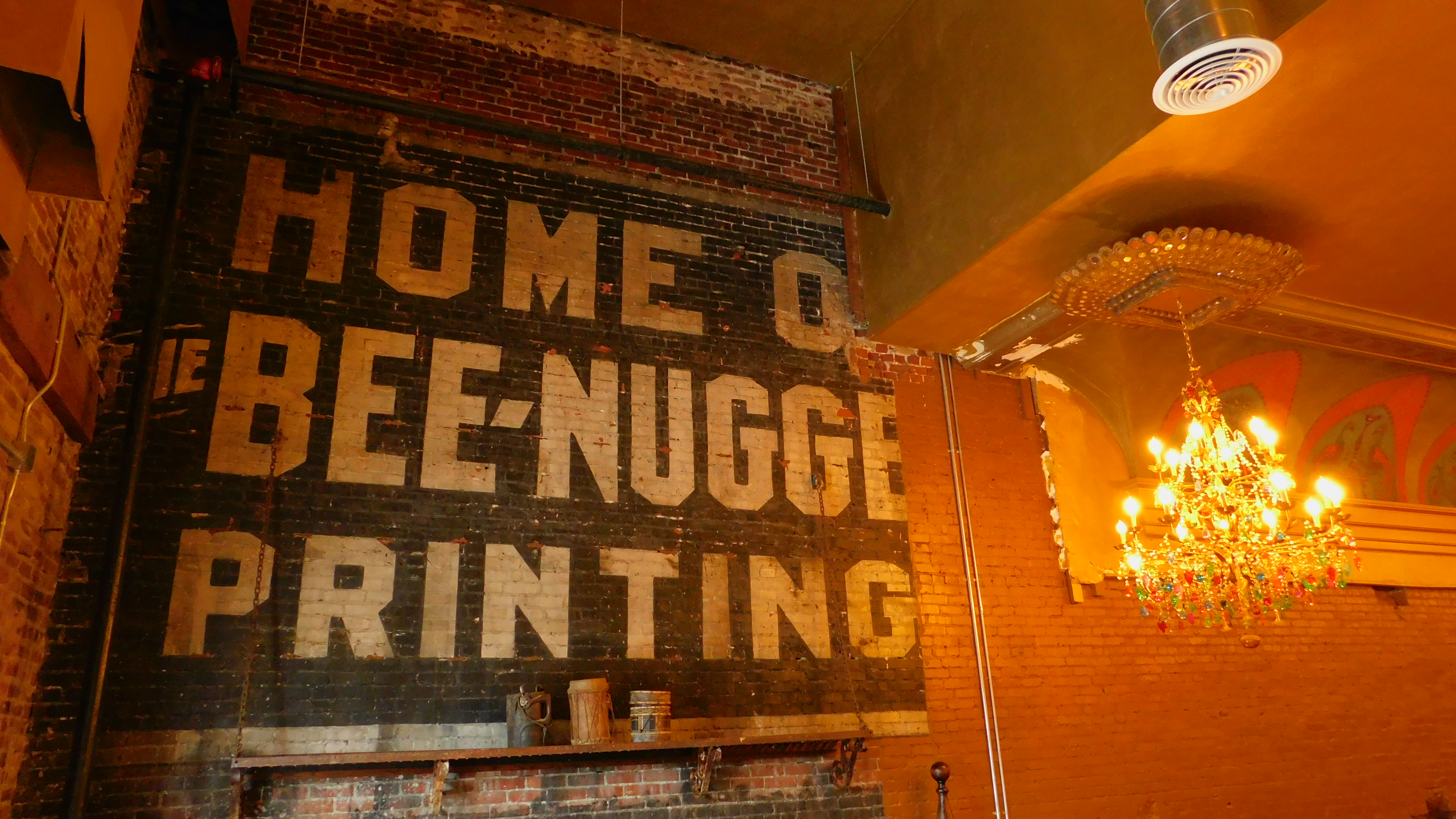
Ghost sign for The Chehalis Bee-Nugget, 2019

The Chehalis Bee-Nugget ceased under its own separate name and publishing in 1937. The newspaper was bought that year by Advocate Publishing, combining the Bee-Nugget with The Lewis County Advocate to create The Chehalis Advocate. The first official issue under the combined name was printed on August 2, 1938. For a time after the merger, the paper switched between using the Bee-Nugget and Advocate nameplates between editions. The editors printed a column on the front page of the August 1938 issue explaining that a unified new name, combining "Chehalis" and "Advocate", was a better solution and would end any confusion. The column also mentioned that the inclusion of, "The", to the title was simply because the word existed in both previous names.

The Chehalis Advocate ceased publication in 1962.

== 1915 Historical Souvenir Edition ==
In 1915, the newspaper under the Bee-Nugget Publishing Company printed a special issue book originally known as The Chehalis Bee-Nugget Historical Souvenir Edition, May 14, 1915. The book covered the history of Chehalis, with some general inclusions about Lewis County. Authorized under the Lewis County commissioner's board, the cover contained a photograph of Mt. St. Helens and Spirit Lake. Facts and photographs of neighborhoods, prominent Chehalis citizens, and businesses were featured throughout the issue. (Note: Several original advertisements from the 1915 Historical Souvenir Edition, as well as the cover featuring Mt. St. Helens, were republished in the 2011 edition.)

We have always adhered to the policy that readers secured through the merits of the paper are of more value to us...we prefer to issue less frequently editions of greater merit and expanse.

— Bee-Nugget Publishing Company,
Proem, The Chehalis Bee-Nugget Historical Souvenir Edition, May 14, 1915

In a proem, the publishers mentioned a free copy was to be given to any existing subscriber to the Bee-Nugget. The issue was printed on "high grade book paper of superior quality" and credit for the new, "not an old one in the book" illustrations was given to R.C. Rohrabacher, an experienced editor of "exceptional ability in special edition work".. A copy sold for 25 cents, with a discount of 20 cents if more than 5 issues were purchased. The print run for the 1915 edition was 3,500 copies; only a few copies were known to remain by 2011, including a small number stored at the Lewis County Historical Museum.

The effort was considered by the Centralia Daily Chronicle Examiner to be "artistic in makeup and unique in design", "excellent", and the "finest publication of its kind" ever printed in Southwest Washington. The issue was an extension of an earlier descriptive booklet issued by the Bee-Nugget in 1909 that the Centralia News Examiner referred to as "handsome", "typographically perfect", and a "credit" to the publishers.

The book was updated and republished in 2011 by local historian, Julie McDonald Zander. Containing 208 pages, the updated publication included an eight-page inclusion for Elizabeth "Eliza" Tynan Saunders Barrett, the "Mother of Chehalis". In the original publication, Barrett was unnamed and alluded to only twice, both in regards to her refusals to sign her land claims to the city during its growth phase in the late 19th century. While McDonald Zander admitted that the reason for Barrett's lack of mention in the 1915 edition was historically unknown, the historian theorized that chauvinism and frustration over her caution in deeding her property were possible causes. Barrett's three divorces were also suspected for her absence in the first edition.

== Publishing aspects ==
=== Advertising ===
The city's Coffman, Dobson & Co. Bank first advertised in both the Bee and Nugget when the financial institution first opened in August 1884. By 1911, the Chehalis Bee-Nugget reported that the bank had advertised, uninterrupted, in each weekly publication since.

=== Content ===
The paper began featuring a long-running column that listed prior news reporting from the archives of the Chehalis Bee and Chehalis Nugget from twenty and forty years prior. The first column was published on December 31, 1926 and featured a list of events from the Lewis County Bee in December 1884.

=== Subscriptions ===
By 1919, a subscription to the Chehalis Bee-Nugget could be purchased in advance for three months at $0.50, a six-month term for $0.75, or a year-long delivery contract priced at $1.50. The paper could be delivered via the Chehalis Post Office as "second-class matter". The rates were increased to seventy-five cents, one dollar, and $2.00, respectively, by 1931.

== Dan W. Bush ==
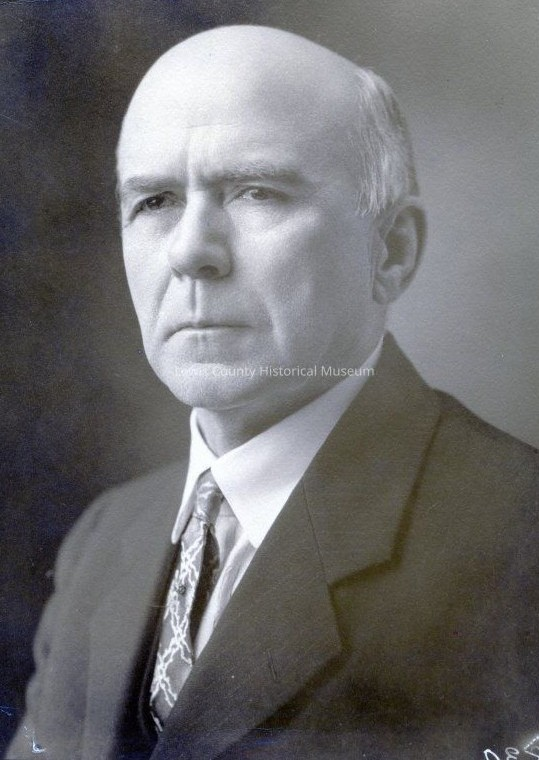
Dan Bush, publisher and editor, Chehalis Bee-Nugget, c. 1920s

After Dan W. Bush sold his shares of The Chehalis Bee-Nugget, he remained in the newspaper business as a correspondent for the Bee-Nugget and several papers in the region, including The Oregonian and the Tacoma Ledger. He continued to write feature articles for the Bee-Nugget up until his death. Bush died on March 7, 1936, succumbing to pneumonia after puncturing a lung during an automobile accident.

In the week following Bush's death, the Bee-Nugget published a column featuring remarks about Bush from various editors and newspapers in Oregon and Washington. His funeral was attended by a crowd that overfilled the church and included many newspapermen in the Twin Cities and Lewis County; the ceremony was described as "impressive". The long funeral procession led to Claquato Cemetery, where Bush was buried amongst the "district's most loyal citizens". Other honors included the flag at the Chehalis Post Office lowered to half-mast; Bush was city's postmaster beginning in 1898, remaining in the position into 1923. Additional memorial services were held by organizations in the city that counted Bush as a member.

== Competing local newspapers ==
The Chehalis Bee-Nugget was the predominant newspaper in Chehalis beginning in the late 1890s despite competition from two upstarts, the Chehalis Examiner and The People's Advocate. (Note: The People's Advocate was commonly referred to as the Chehalis Advocate in news reports around the turn of the 20th century decades before it officially became the Chehalis Advocate in 1938. See sourcing throughout the article.) The Examiner was originally known as the Pe Ell Examiner out of Pe Ell, Washington; it began in 1895 and relocated to Chehalis in late 1898. Due to having "two Republican papers" in Chehalis and thus an "unprofitable investment", the Examiner consolidated with the Centralia News to become a "Democrat paper" retitled as The Centralia News-Examiner on July 1, 1901.

The People's Advocate became known as the Lewis County Advocate in 1902. Outside of a daily, mimeograph newspaper published in the mid-1950s, known as the "Scoop", no other newspaper competed with the Chehalis Advocate until its closure in 1962. The last newspaper in Chehalis was a weekly known as The Weekly News. Established in 1979 by Phil Roewe, it was sold the following year to Bill Loesch. The paper was renamed the Chehalis Times in 1981 and ceased that same year.

Competing newspapers in nearby Centralia included The Centralia News, established in 1877, and The Chronicle. Both The Chronicle , in 1910, and the News-Examiner, in 1911, switched to daily publications. In 1912, the two papers merged to become the Chronicle-Examiner due to the difficult competitive nature of two, daily newspapers in the city. The moniker changed to The Daily Chronicle in 1916, eventually becoming known succinctly as The Chronicle.

Other competing newspapers that existed in Lewis County included the Lewis County News, the Little Falls Citizen, the Morton Journal, the Pe Ell Enterprise, the Toledo Recorder, and the Winlock News.

Newspapers that competed in the area located in south Thurston County included the Bucoda Enterprise and Bucoda News, the South County Sun, and four papers located in and named after Tenino, the Enterprise, Independent, Journal, and News.

== Recognition and criticism ==
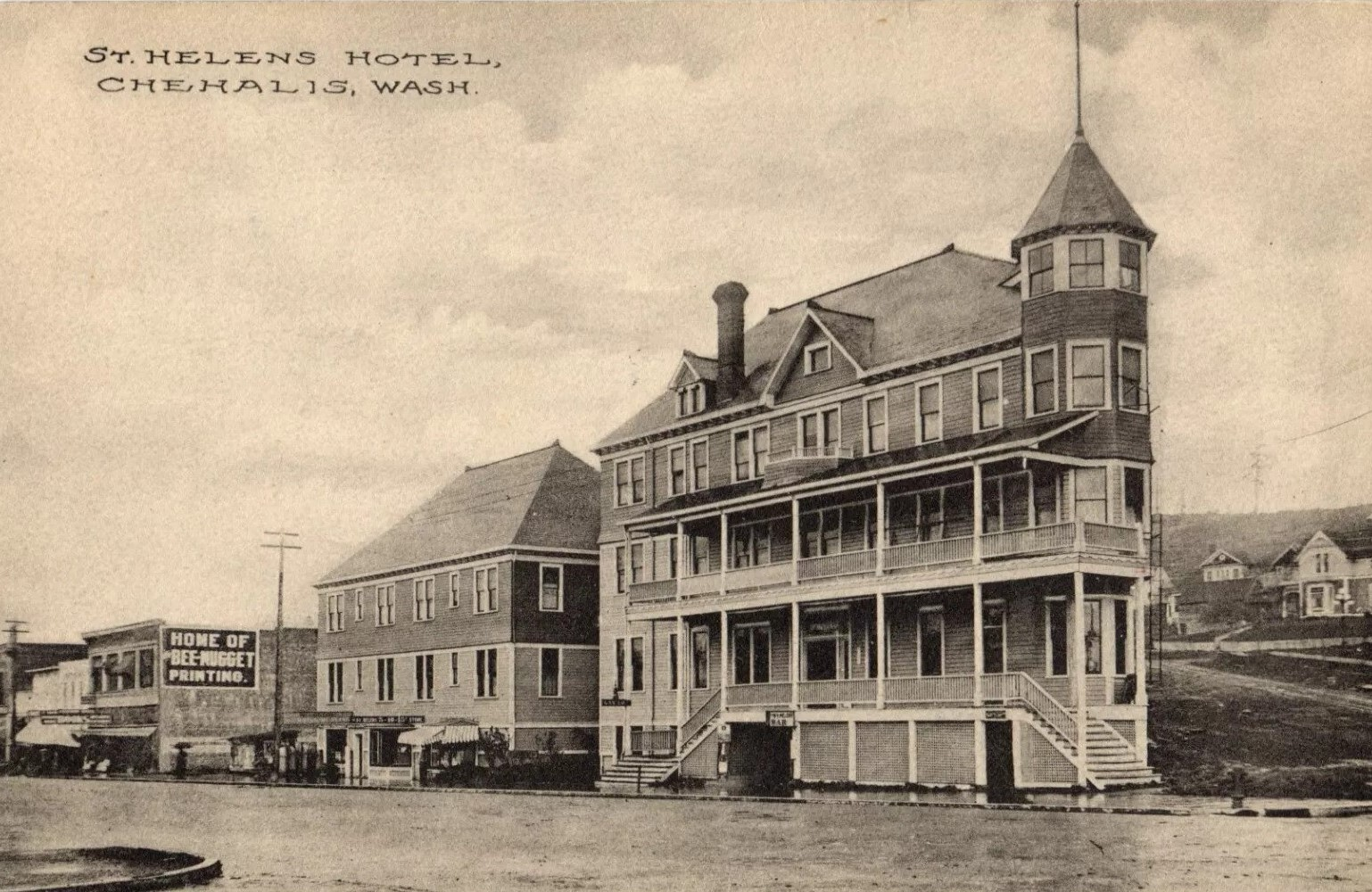
The Bee-Nugget offices, immediately north of the St. Helens Hotel, c.1904-1910

In 1904, The Seattle Republican wrote a political commentary deeming the Bee-Nugget to be "in the bushes", though not in the "woods"; the editorial, however, did not accuse the paper of being involved in "bushwhacking".

Competing newspapers in the Twin Cities (Note: Centralia and Chehalis are referred to as the Twin Cities due to their immediate location to one another. See articles of both cities for additional information.) were often at odds with the Bee-Nugget, usually pertaining to differing political opinions or a perceived lack of pressing certain local matters. The paper was often accused of siding with particular politicians and being in league with powerful leaders and businessmen. Personal insults or a lack of professional decorum were also common, such as the Centralia Daily Chronicle referring to Dan Bush as "Bee-Nugget Danny".

The Centralia News-Examiner warned the Bee-Nugget in 1905 to "watch our smoke" after the Chehalis paper was criticized for unfairly comparing the higher receipts of the Chehalis Post Office over the Centralia Post Office. In 1908, the Bee-Nugget was accused by the Centralia Daily Chronicle of being an "organ" to certain political members of the county. The commentary was based on the belief that the Bee-Nugget's reporting on a potential investigation of county affairs before an election was only due to "political motivation".

The Centralia Weekly Examiner expressed concerns in 1911 over the Bee-Nugget's upstart, The Daily Nugget, claiming that the new venture was similar to that of the weekly issue, which was accused of "twisting the fact(s) to please a certain ring". The Examiner suggested that if the two papers instead employed a live correspondent, the Chehalis newspapers would no longer be considered part of a "joke class". The Centralia Daily Chronicle-Examiner mentioned in 1915 that the Bee-Nugget was "one of the best weeklies" in the United States. A similar sentiment was shared by the Eatonville Dispatch in 1923, referring to the Bee-Nugget as the "best weekly newspaper in Southwest Washington".

== See also ==
- List of newspapers in Washington (state)
