= Bar Bacetto =

Restaurant in Waitsburg, Washington, U.S.

- Interactive map of Bar Bacetto

Restaurant information
- Established: 2022
- Closed: 2024
- Food type: Italian
- Location: 119 Main Street, Waitsburg, Washington, 99361, United States
- Coordinates: 46°16′16″N 118°9′17″W

Bar Bacetto is an Italian restaurant in Waitsburg, Washington, United States. Established in October 2022, the business was included in The New York Times's 2023 list of the 50 best restaurants in the United States. In 2024, Bar Bacetto was a semifinalist in the Best New Restaurant category of the James Beard Foundation Awards.

Owner and chef Mike Easton closed the restaurant in June 2024 and moved to Walla Walla to open a Detroit-style pizzeria but re-opened in February, 2025.

== See also ==
- List of Italian restaurants
