= Waitsburg Times =

Newspaper published in Waitsburg, Washington, USA

- Type: Weekly newspaper
- Founder(s): C.W. Wheeler
- Publisher: Lane Gwinn
- Founded: 1878
- Language: English
- City: Waitsburg, Washington
- Circulation: 1,600 (as of 2022)
- OCLC number: 17390356
- Website: waitsburgtimes.com

The Waitsburg Times is a weekly newspaper based in Waitsburg, Washington, United States. It is published on Thursdays and covers local news, sports, business and community events in Waitsburg and Walla Walla County. It has a circulation of about 1,500. The publisher is Lane Gwinn.

== History ==
The creation of the Waitsburg Times came about on March 11, 1878, when the Waitsburg Printing and Publishing Association was formed off the back of urging from the public. The association had a capital of $1,250 in shares, which quickly sold at $25 each and so began the newspaper with B. K. Land as the editor. Financially, the plant and paper did not see great success and were suspended for a few weeks before J. C. Swask obtained the lease. Swask ran the paper for 8 months before selling the lease to C. W. Wheeler on August 20, 1881. The paper briefly ran a daily edition beginning in 1889 under the direction of Mr. Wheeler.

Between 1894 and 1909, the Waitsburg Times has absorbed three other Waitsburg papers including the Enterprise and the Democratic Banner. In 1909, the Times acquired the Waitsburg Gazette, a competing newspaper which had been publishing for eleven years. At the time it was managed by E. L. Wheeler. In 1939, Wheeler worked with the heirs of an estate at the center of town which was destroyed by fire to convert it into a public park.

In 1963, Thomas C. Baker came to work for The Times alongside publisher Carl Dilts. After a year of working for the paper, he would officially become the editor and publisher. Baker began his own weekly editorial for the paper in the 1980s, which was known as "TOMfoolery." In 1991, Baker sold the paper, which at the time had a circulation of 1,800, to Ron and Jane Smith. Baker continued to write his weekly publications for the paper until 2009.

After five years, Tom Baker's son Loyal Baker took over the paper from the Smiths after they decided to move back to California. He then sold it to Imbert and Kareen Matthee in 2009. Five years later the Matthees sold the paper to Ken Graham, who operated the Times until it was purchased in 2019 by Lane Gwinn.
