= Waitsburg, Washington =

- City
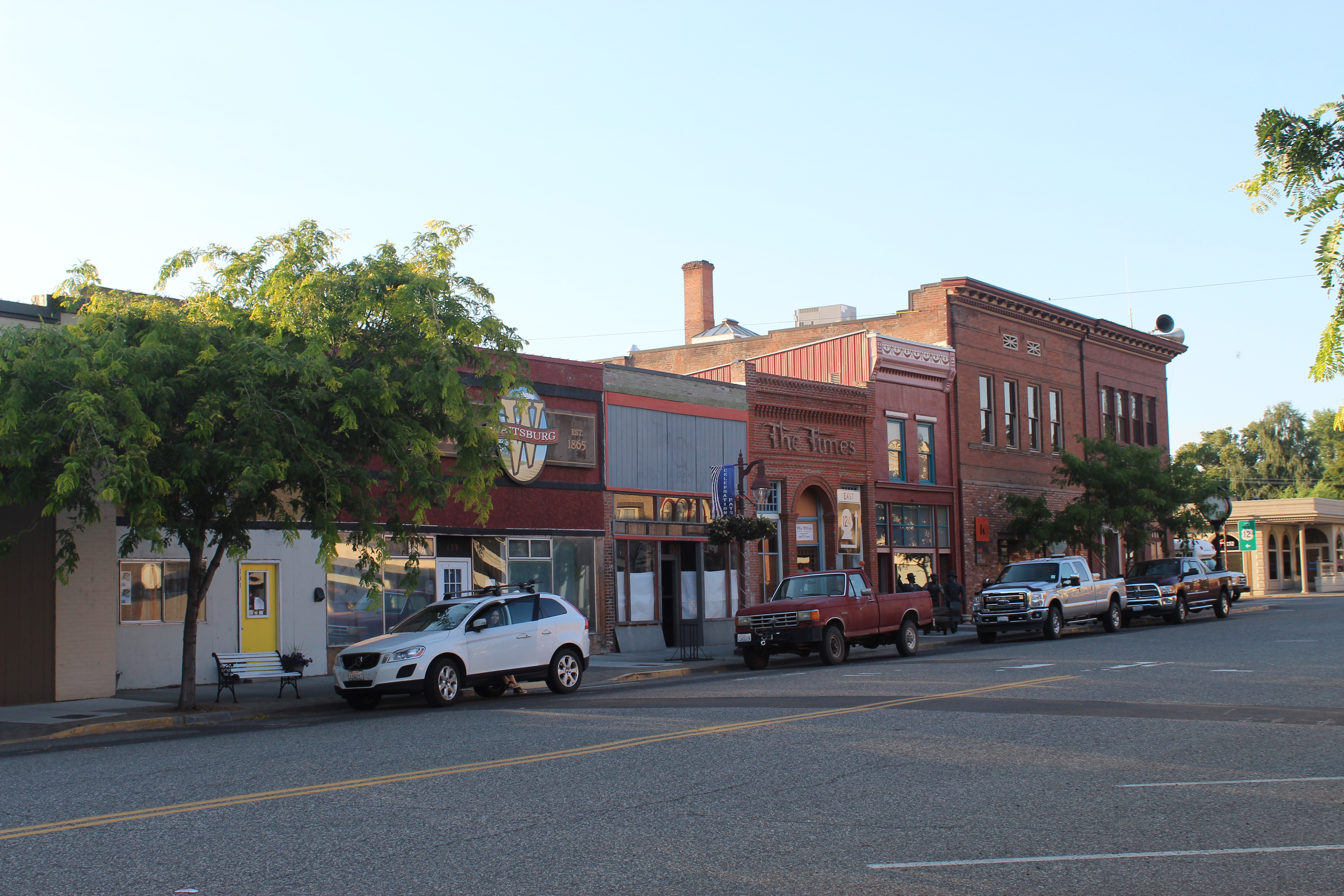
- Waitsburg in 2019

- Location of Waitsburg, Washington
- Coordinates: 46°16′11″N 118°09′03″W
- Country: United States
- State: Washington
- County: Walla Walla

Government
  - Type: Mayor–council
  - Mayor: Marty Dunn

Area
  - Total: 1.16 sq mi (3.01 km^{2})
  - Land: 1.16 sq mi (3.01 km^{2})
  - Water: 0 sq mi (0.00 km^{2})
- Elevation: 1,253 ft (382 m)

Population (2020)
  - Total: 1,166
  - Density: 1,058.3/sq mi (408.62/km^{2})
- Time zone: UTC-8 (Pacific (PST))
  - Summer (DST): UTC-7 (PDT)
- ZIP code: 99361
- Area code: 509
- FIPS code: 53-75565
- GNIS feature ID: 2412165
- Website: www.cityofwaitsburg.com

Waitsburg is a city in Walla Walla County, Washington, United States. The population was 1,166 at the 2020 census. Waitsburg has a unique city classification in Washington state, being the state's only city which still operates under its territorial charter.

Located on the Touchet River in a rural area of southeastern Washington, Waitsburg has long been tied to the agricultural economy of its surrounding region. The milling of wheat played a prominent role in the first century of Waitsburg's existence, though in recent decades the economy has pivoted towards viticulture and tourism due to its location within the Walla Walla AVA. The downtown core of the community, dating to the 1880s, is listed on the National Register of Historic Places as the Waitsburg Historic District.

== History ==
Prior to settlement by European American pioneers, the area that is now Waitsburg was home to the Palouse people. The juncture of the Touchet River and Coppei Creek, where Waitsburg would eventually develop, was recorded in the journals of the Lewis and Clark Expedition during their return trip in 1806.

Waitsburg was first settled in 1859 by Robert Kennedy. Another early settler, Albert Gallatin Lloyd, helped settle persistent confrontations with the Palouse people by negotiating a treaty allowing the native population to camp on the land that he claimed. The arrangement established by that treaty, though not backed up by law, continued informally into the 1940s. William Perry Bruce and his wife, Caroline, moved to Waitsburg in 1861, some two decades before Waitsburg was officially incorporated on November 25, 1881. In 1882, they built a large home in the town, which today functions as a museum.

Early settlers raised cattle and horses and grew grain along the banks of the Touchet River and the creeks which feed into it. During the 1860s, dryland farming of the adjacent hills led to expansion of wheat production around Waitsburg. That development, along with the discovery of gold in the valley of the Clearwater River to the east, brought an influx of population to the area. Due to the mining boom in the Clearwater region, a stagecoach line was established connecting Walla Walla in the west with Lewiston, Idaho, at the juncture of the Clearwater and Snake Rivers, to the east, passed through what would become Waitsburg, bringing travelers heading to and from the mines. This connection between the nascent Waitsburg community and the mining district led to a meeting between Dennis Willard, a landowner in the Waitsburg area, and Sylvester M. Wait, in Lewiston in 1864. Willard convinced Wait of the potential to ship wheat flour down the Touchet valley and allowed him to establish a mill on his land that same year. The city of Waitsburg would later be named for Sylvester M. Wait.

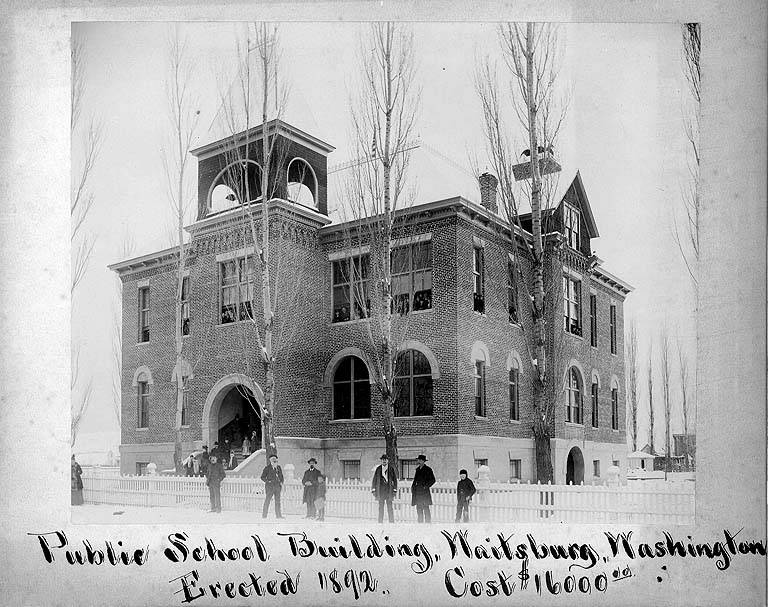
Waitsburg School circa 1893

With the establishment of the mill, a community began to coalesce around Wait's mill which included a school, saloon, store, hotel and post office. The town was platted in 1869 and named Waitsburg. By 1870, the town was home to over 100 residents in 35 dwellings and an assortment of businesses. N. J. A. Smith, an early settler and schoolmaster, called Waitsburg the only place of note between Walla Walla and Lewiston. Waitsburg's notability continued to expand throughout the 1870s, during which it would be connected by telegraph line to Portland, Oregon and with the establishment of a newspaper, the Waitsburg Times.

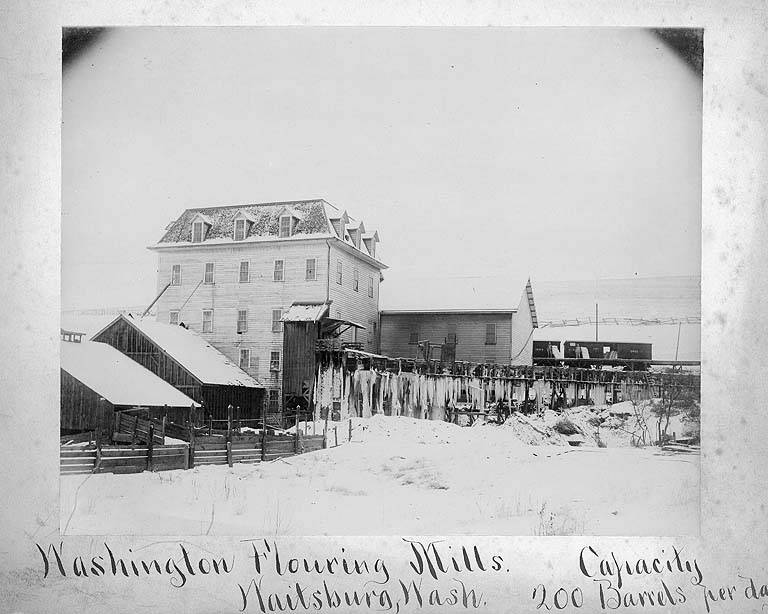
Waitsburg Mill circa 1893

Disaster struck on September 13, 1880, when a fire ravaged the town's business district. The area was quickly rebuilt, this time with brick, and a year later, in 1881, the Oregon Railroad and Navigation Company completed a line through Waitsburg connecting it by rail with Walla Walla and the outside world. On November 25, 1881, the city was officially incorporated as the City of Waitsburg. The original charter was revised five years later, in 1886, and the revised charter has been in place ever since. It was under the revised charter that official city services like police, fire and utilities came to the community. Waitsburg's commercial importance as a mill town continued to grow throughout this decade and Wait's Mill, no longer owned by Wait and eventually known as Washington Mills, was expanded and improved, notably with the introduction of steel machinery. By the end of the decade in 1890, Waitsburg's population exceeded 800 people.

The mill continued to be the economic heart of Waitsburg through the late 1800s and into the mid-20th century. In 1936 it was converted from a water-powered mill to electric. It would operate as an electric mill for over two decades until it was closed down in 1957. The abandoned mill stood until a fire destroyed it in 2009. Despite the closure of the mill, Waitsburg remained relatively stable economically and in terms of population throughout the second half of the 20th century as a commercial center supporting the surrounding agricultural region.

Since the turn of the 21st century, Waitsburg's economic fortunes have been bolstered by the growth of the wine industry. The community is located in the Walla Walla AVA and has become a destination for wine tourists. During the first two decades of the 21st century, numerous businesses were established catering to these tourists including specialty restaurants, bars and hotels. Waitsburg's Bar Bacetto was one of 10 nominees for the 2024 James Beard Award for Best New Restaurant.

=== Historic places ===
Waitsburg has three properties and one designated historic district that are on the National Register of Historic Places (NRHP). The oldest is the William Perry Bruce House, a Victorian Italianate home built in 1883 by town founder William Perry Bruce; it was later converted into a public library and now houses the Bruce Memorial Museum, run by the local historical society. Preston Hall, a former school building built in 1913, was added to the register in 1993. The modern Waitsburg High School, opened in 1927, is also listed on the NRHP. The Waitsburg Historic District, which encompasses most of downtown Waitsburg, includes 23 properties that were built between 1880 and 1930.

NRHP entries in Waitsburg
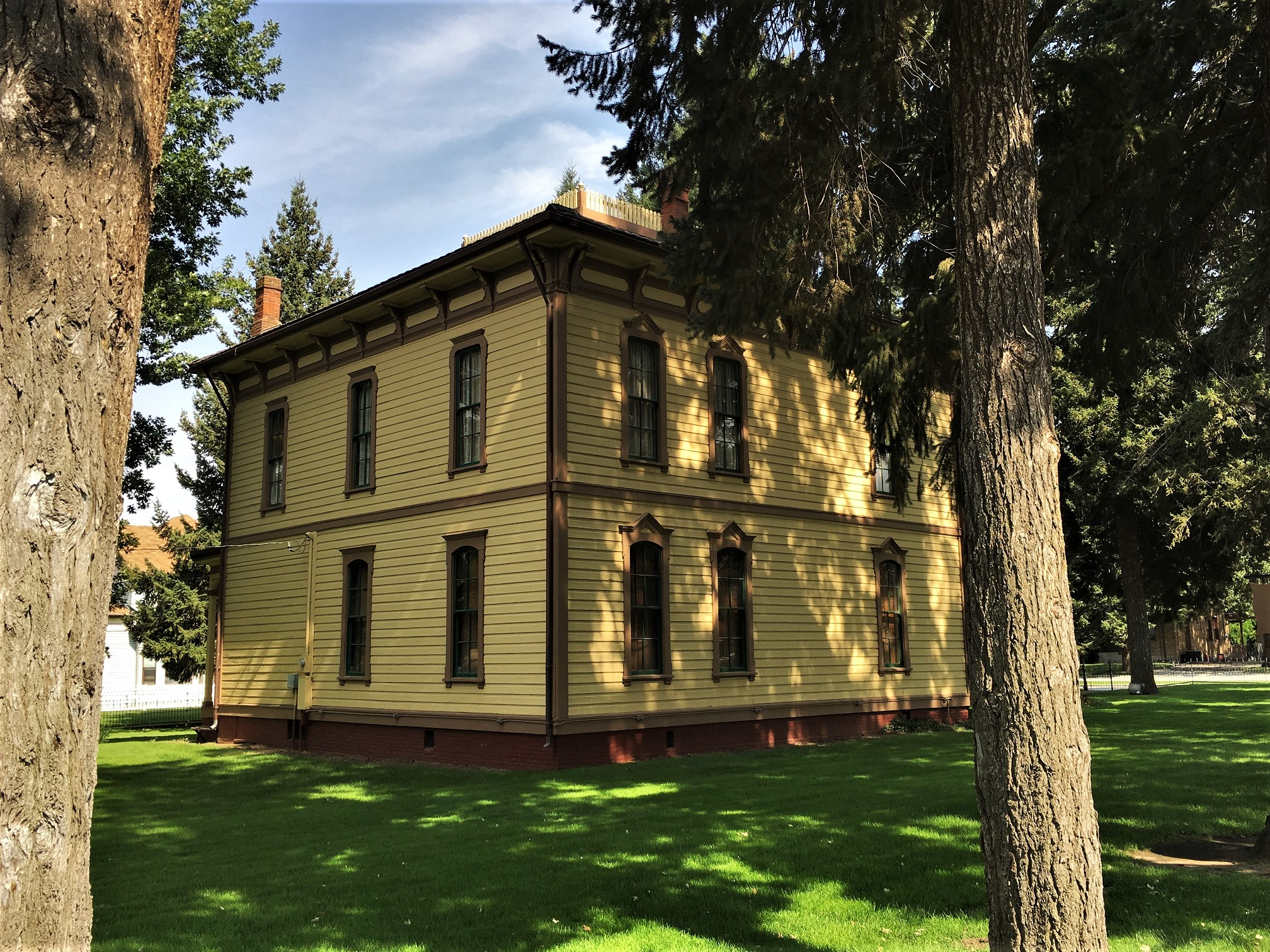
William Perry Bruce House

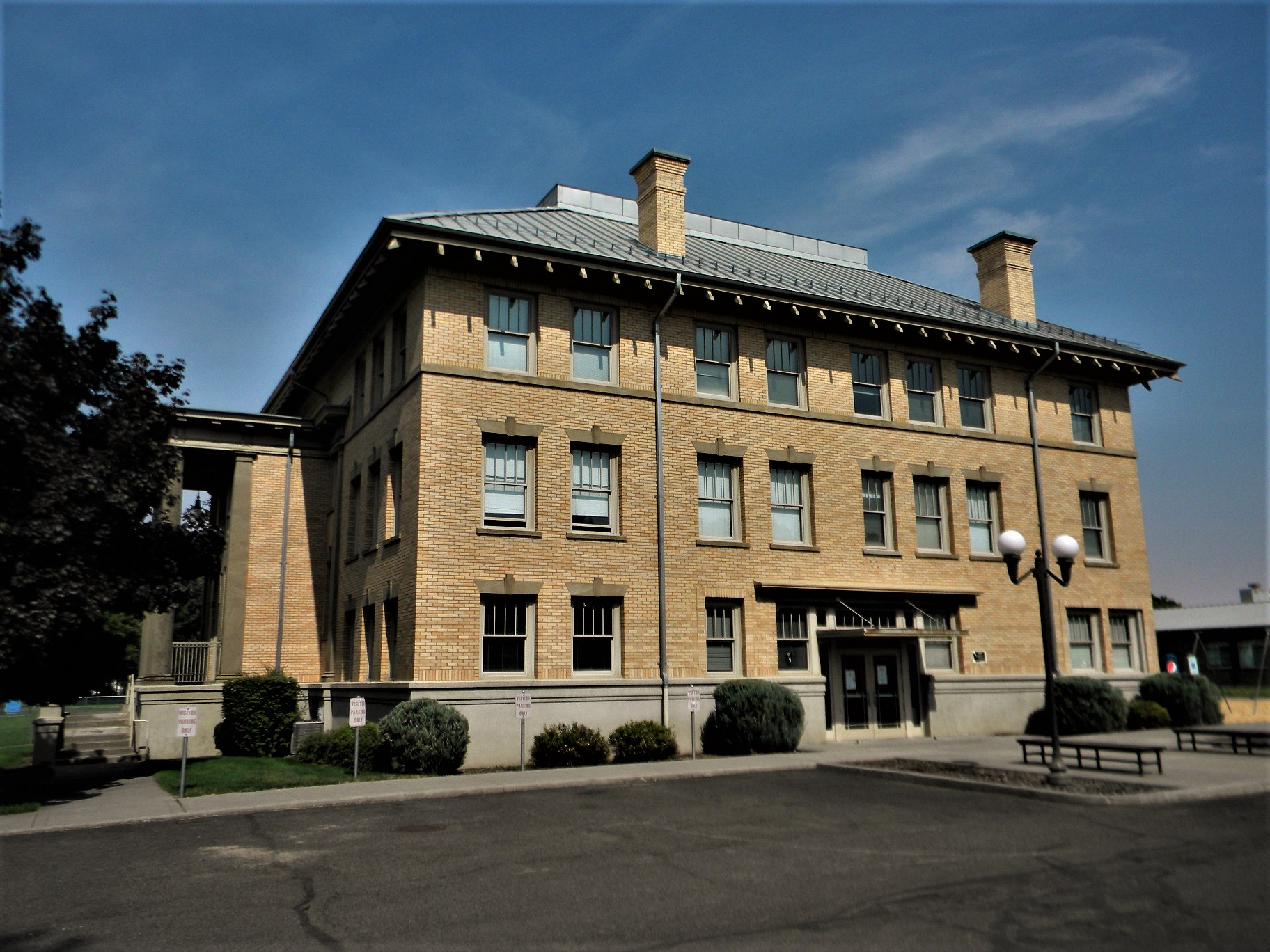
Preston Hall

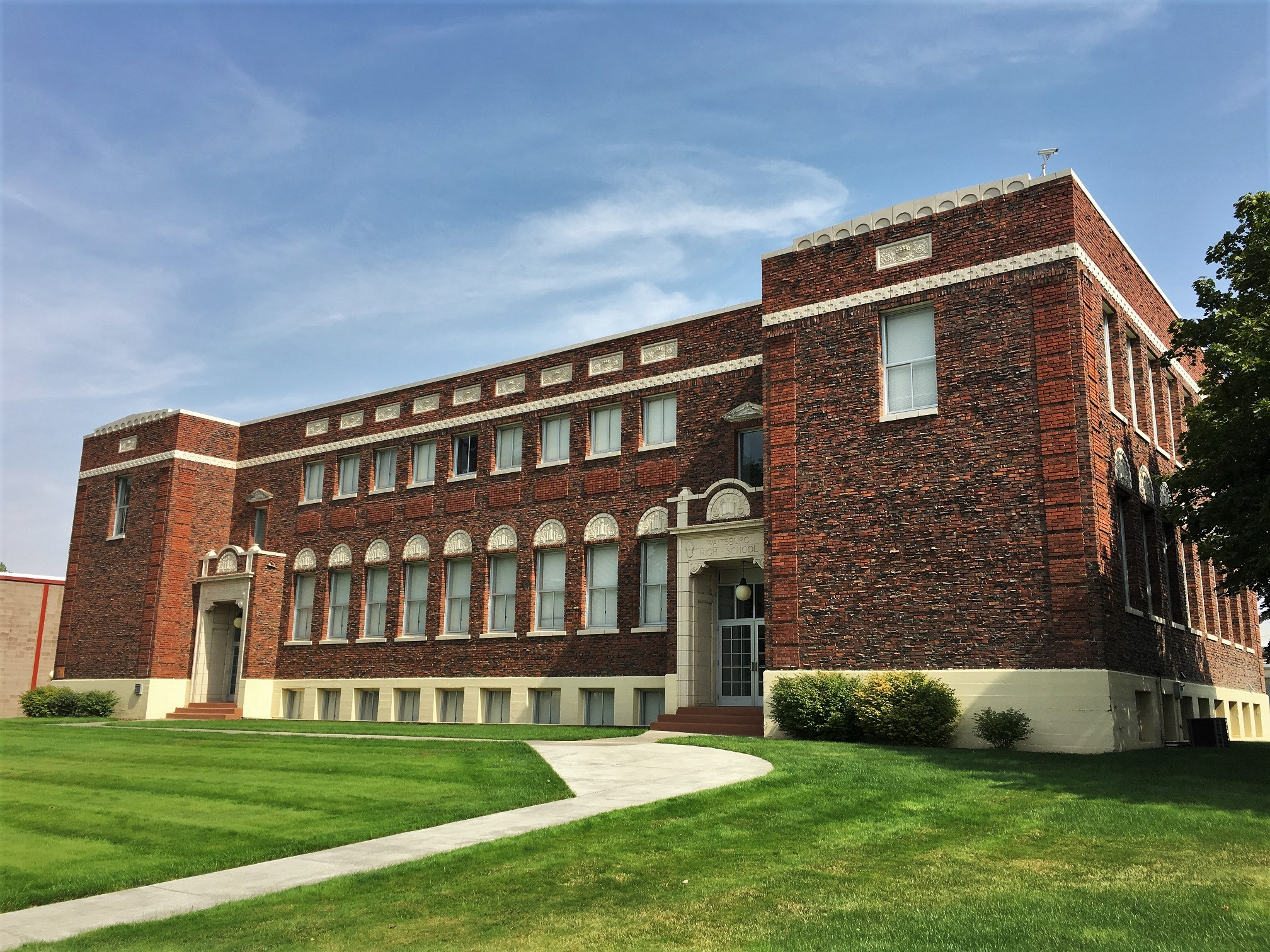
Waitsburg High School

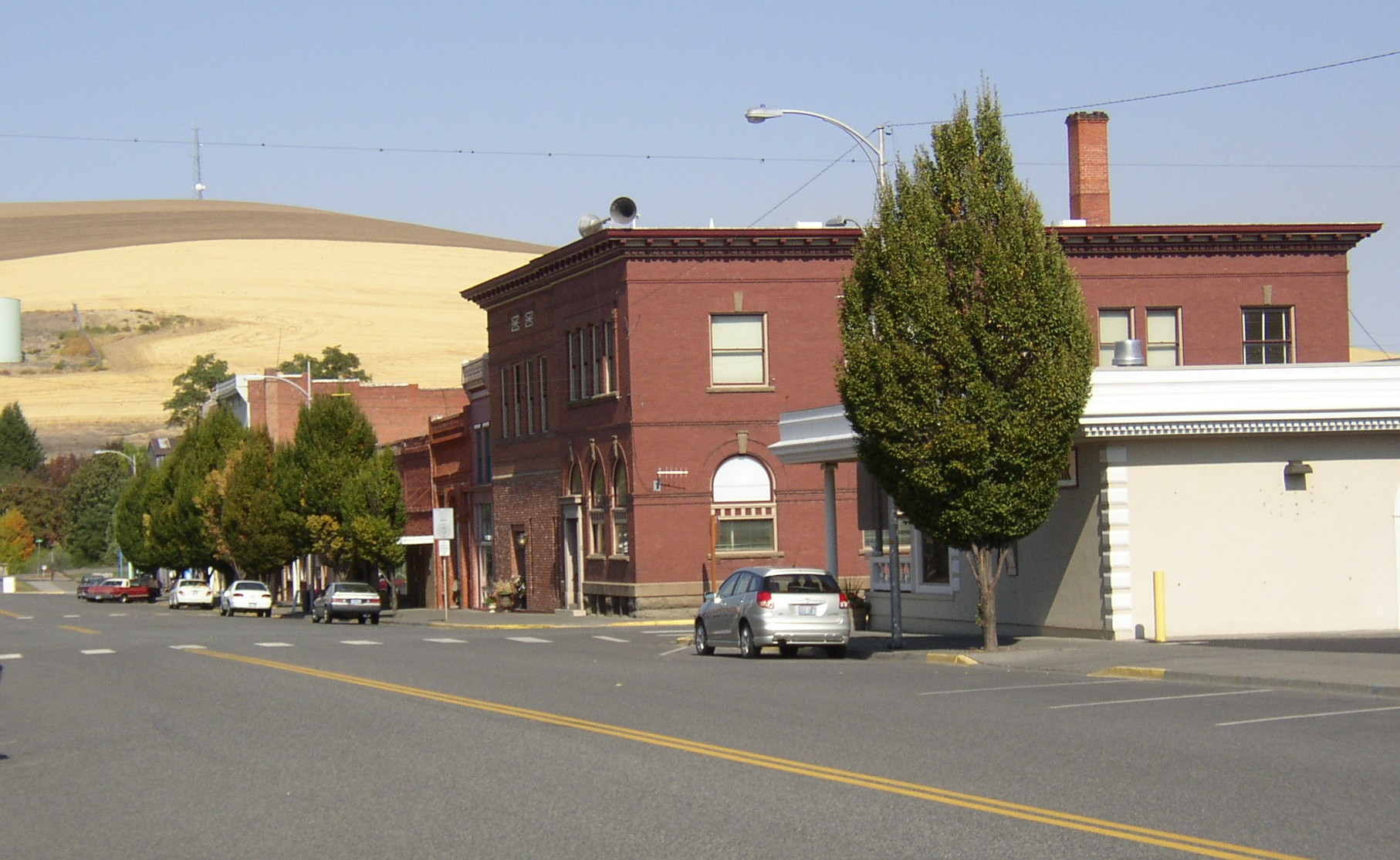
Waitsburg Historic District

== Geography ==
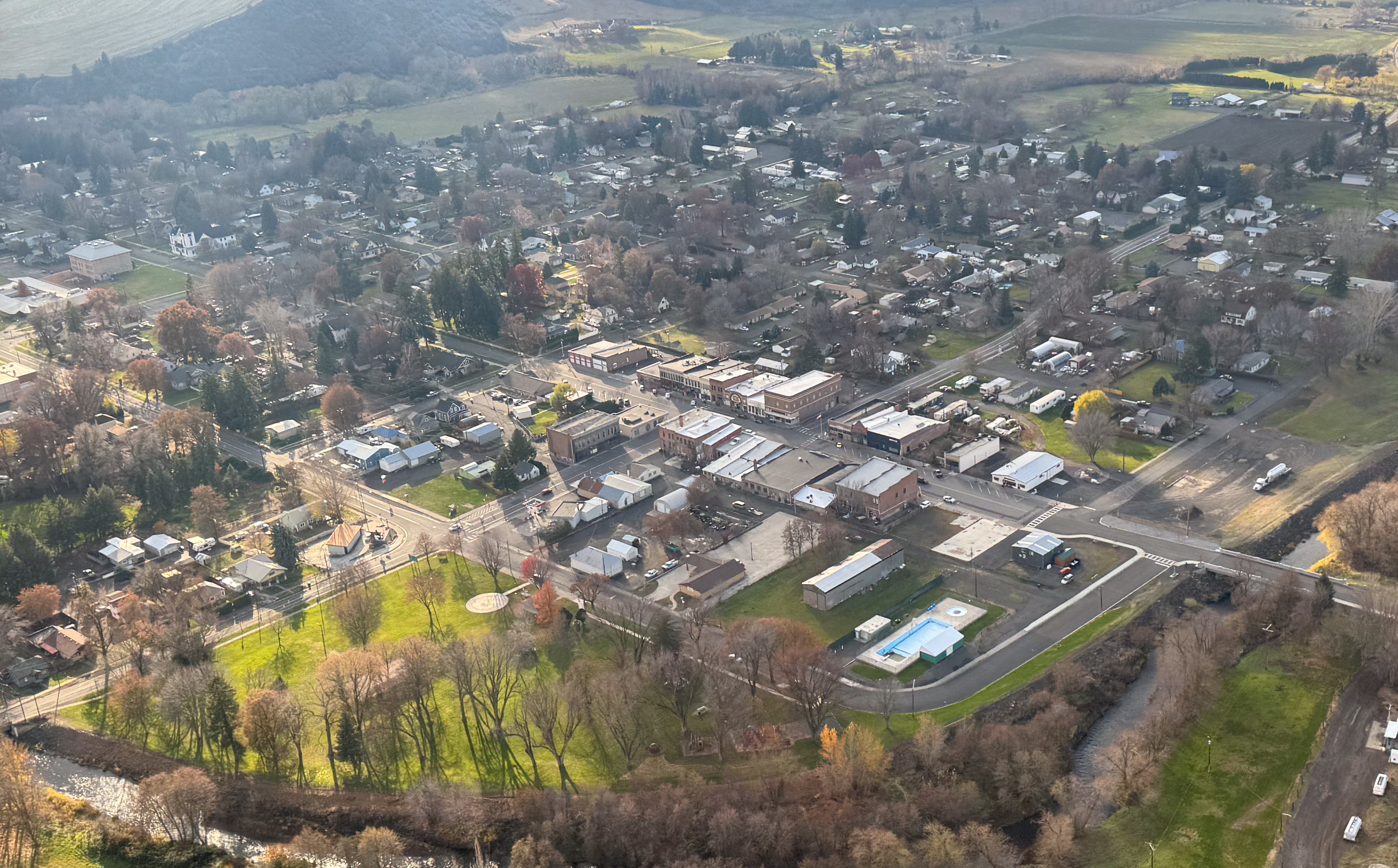
Waitsburg with the Touchet River in the foreground

According to the United States Census Bureau, the city has a total area of 1.12 square miles (2.90 km^{2}), all of it land.

Waitsburg is located in the valley of the Touchet River in southeastern Washington. The Touchet River passes along the northern edge of the town and is joined by Wilson Creek, which passes through the eastern portion of Waitsburg, and Coppei Creek, which flows through the western portion. The thin valley of the Touchet River sits at roughly 1,300 feet above sea level at Waitsburg with hillsides rising to roughly 1,700 feet within a mile of the town to both the north and the south. The surrounding terrain of rolling hills is covered with farmland dominated by wheat and barley.

=== Climate ===
This region experiences warm (but not hot) and dry summers, with no average monthly temperatures above 71.6 °F (22 °C). According to the Köppen Climate Classification system, Waitsburg has a warm-summer Mediterranean climate, abbreviated "Csb" on climate maps.

Climate data for Waitsburg, Washington
Month	Jan	Feb	Mar	Apr	May	Jun	Jul	Aug	Sep	Oct	Nov	Dec	Year
Mean daily maximum °C (°F)	4 (40)	7 (45)	12 (53)	16 (61)	21 (69)	25 (77)	31 (87)	30 (86)	24 (76)	18 (64)	9 (49)	5 (41)	17 (62)
Mean daily minimum °C (°F)	−4 (25)	−2 (29)	1 (34)	3 (38)	7 (44)	10 (50)	13 (55)	12 (54)	8 (47)	4 (39)	0 (32)	−3 (27)	4 (39)
Average precipitation mm (inches)	61 (2.4)	48 (1.9)	53 (2.1)	41 (1.6)	41 (1.6)	33 (1.3)	13 (0.5)	13 (0.5)	23 (0.9)	41 (1.6)	64 (2.5)	64 (2.5)	490 (19.3)
Source: Weatherbase

== Demographics ==
Historical population
Census	Pop.	Note	%±
1880	248		—
1890	817		229.4%
1900	1,011		23.7%
1910	1,237		22.4%
1920	1,174		−5.1%
1930	869		−26.0%
1940	936		7.7%
1950	1,015		8.4%
1960	1,010		−0.5%
1970	953		−5.6%
1980	1,035		8.6%
1990	990		−4.3%
2000	1,212		22.4%
2010	1,217		0.4%
2020	1,166		−4.2%
U.S. Decennial Census

=== 2020 census ===
As of the 2020 census, Waitsburg had a population of 1,166. The median age was 42.9 years. 22.4% of residents were under the age of 18 and 20.7% of residents were 65 years of age or older. For every 100 females there were 100.3 males, and for every 100 females age 18 and over there were 94.6 males age 18 and over.

0.0% of residents lived in urban areas, while 100.0% lived in rural areas.

There were 480 households in Waitsburg, of which 30.0% had children under the age of 18 living in them. Of all households, 50.6% were married-couple households, 15.4% were households with a male householder and no spouse or partner present, and 25.6% were households with a female householder and no spouse or partner present. About 26.5% of all households were made up of individuals and 12.5% had someone living alone who was 65 years of age or older.

There were 530 housing units, of which 9.4% were vacant. The homeowner vacancy rate was 1.8% and the rental vacancy rate was 6.6%.

Racial composition as of the 2020 census
Race	Number	Percent
White	1,008	86.4%
Black or African American	4	0.3%
American Indian and Alaska Native	11	0.9%
Asian	5	0.4%
Native Hawaiian and Other Pacific Islander	0	0.0%
Some other race	46	3.9%
Two or more races	92	7.9%
Hispanic or Latino (of any race)	102	8.7%

=== 2010 census ===
As of the 2010 census, there were 1,217 people, 475 households, and 328 families residing in the city. The population density was 1,086.6 inhabitants per square mile (419.5/km^{2}). There were 522 housing units at an average density of 466.1 per square mile (180.0/km^{2}). The racial makeup of the city was 93.1% White, 0.2% African American, 1.5% Native American, 0.7% Asian, 0.2% Pacific Islander, 1.9% from other races, and 2.3% from two or more races. Hispanic or Latino of any race were 5.3% of the population.

There were 475 households, of which 37.5% had children under the age of 18 living with them, 53.3% were married couples living together, 10.7% had a female householder with no husband present, 5.1% had a male householder with no wife present, and 30.9% were non-families. 25.7% of all households were made up of individuals, and 14.7% had someone living alone who was 65 years of age or older. The average household size was 2.56 and the average family size was 3.04.

The median age in the city was 41 years. 26.4% of residents were under the age of 18; 8% were between the ages of 18 and 24; 21.2% were from 25 to 44; 28.4% were from 45 to 64; and 16.1% were 65 years of age or older. The gender makeup of the city was 49.6% male and 50.4% female.

=== 2000 census ===
As of the 2000 census, there were 1,212 people, 490 households, and 314 families residing in the city. The population density was 1,279.5 people per square mile (492.6/km^{2}). There were 522 housing units at an average density of 551.1 per square mile (212.2/km^{2}). The racial makeup of the city was 94.80% White, 0.58% African American, 0.41% Native American, 0.66% Asian, 1.16% from other races, and 2.39% from two or more races. Hispanic or Latino of any race were 2.81% of the population.

There were 490 households, out of which 32.9% had children under the age of 18 living with them, 51.0% were married couples living together, 9.0% had a female householder with no husband present, and 35.9% were non-families. 31.4% of all households were made up of individuals, and 15.9% had someone living alone who was 65 years of age or older. The average household size was 2.47 and the average family size was 3.13.

In the city, the age distribution of the population shows 29.7% under the age of 18, 5.4% from 18 to 24, 24.8% from 25 to 44, 23.5% from 45 to 64, and 16.6% who were 65 years of age or older. The median age was 39 years. For every 100 females, there were 97.4 males. For every 100 females age 18 and over, there were 92.3 males.

The median income for a household in the city was $33,527, and the median income for a family was $40,865. Males had a median income of $31,625 versus $21,518 for females. The per capita income for the city was $16,803. About 10.6% of families and 14.0% of the population were below the poverty line, including 14.8% of those under age 18 and 10.0% of those age 65 or over.

== Transportation ==
U.S. Route 12 passes through Waitsburg and continues south to Walla Walla and east to Clarkston. In downtown, it intersects State Route 124, which travels west towards the Tri-Cities area.
