= The Chronicle (Centralia, Washington) =

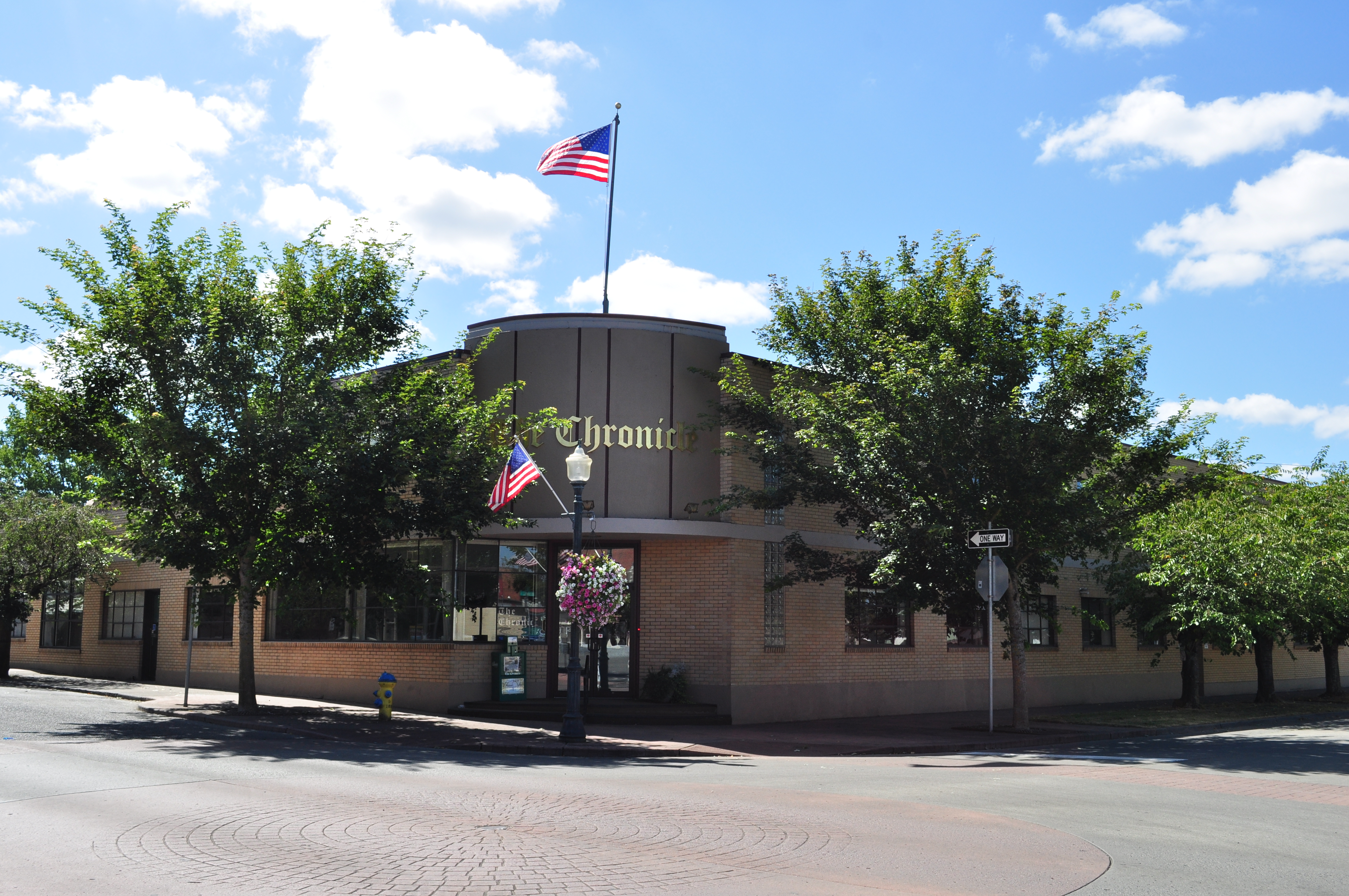
- The Chronicle building, 1947—2025
- Type: Weekly newspaper
- Format: Broadsheet
- Owner: CT Publishing
- Founder(s): Thomas Scammons and J. E. Whinnery
- Founded: 1889
- Language: English
- Headquarters: 215 N. Pearl Street; Centralia, Washington
- Circulation: 10,200 (as of 2022)
- OCLC number: 22107864
- Website: chronline.com

The Chronicle, formerly the Daily Chronicle, is a local newspaper in Centralia, Washington, US. Its newsroom covers happenings in all of Lewis County and parts of neighboring Thurston, Cowlitz, Grays Harbor, Pierce, Pacific, Wahkiakum and Yakima counties.

The newspaper is owned by CT Publishing and publishes three print editions per week and daily online, where it maintains the "Daily Chronicle" moniker. The Chronicle shares local, statewide and regional news, wire stories and sports, including high school sports out of 17 nearby school districts.

== History ==
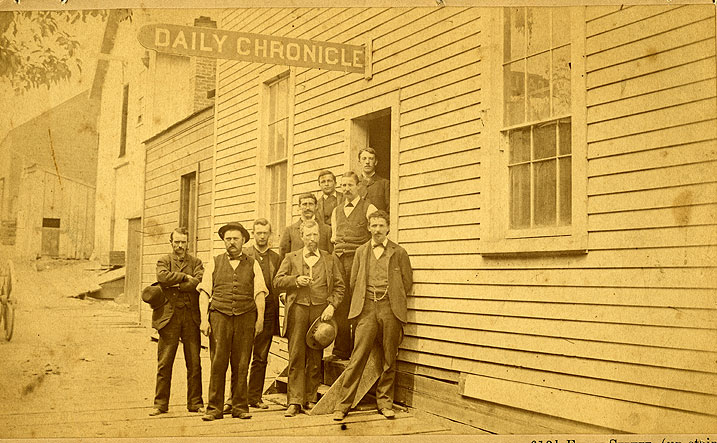
Staff outside of the Daily Chronicle building, ca. 1880s

The Weekly Chronicle was founded in July 1889 by Thomas Scammons and J. E. Whinnery. It switched to daily publication the following year, renaming itself The Daily Chronicle. Also known as the Centralia News, the newspaper resided in the city's historic district beginning in 1920 on Tower Avenue, moving to a location on Pearl Street in 1947 where it remained into August 2025.

The Chronicle was purchased by Jeraldine and Richard Lafromboise in 1968. Richard died months after the sale and Jeraldine, known as "Jeri", oversaw operations until 2012.

In 2011, The Chronicle switched to publishing three editions per week due to declines in revenue, instead publishing digital editions on the remaining days. Lafromboise Communications, under Jenifer Lafromboise Falcon, sold The Chronicle to the Taylor family, owner of The Silver Agency in Chehalis, in January 2021. Two weekly papers in Southwest Washington, The Reflector and the Nisqually Valley News, were also part of the sale. The Pearl Street building that hosted the newspaper's operations remained under ownership of Falcon. The new ownership company was given the name, CT Publishing.

The organization was served a legal notice in September 2023 from Joe Kent, a runner-up in the 2022 election for Washington's 3rd congressional district, that requested a retraction of The Chronicle's reporting of a March 2022 town hall meeting. Kent stated that the reporting included defamatory statements regarding whether or not he agreed with viewpoints brought forth by members of the audience that promoted white nationalism. The Chronicle stood by its coverage, citing an audio clip of the meeting in question.

In March 2024, the newspaper unveiled a newspaper vending machine that accepts Bitcoin as payment. The Pearl Street building, a 22,452-square-foot (2,085.9 m^{2}) structure constructed in 1947, was listed for sale in March 2025 for $1.2 million. CT Publishing bought a former bank and city-owned building for $650,000 in June one block south on Pearl Street as a new home for The Chronicle. The newspaper officially moved offices to the new location in late August 2025.

CT Publishing launched an online newspaper, the Thurston Chronicle, in December 2025. Overlapping and working along with the company's other three newspaper outlets, the Thurston Chronicle is to report within Thurston County, particularly in high school sports and various county and city governments, including the Port of Olympia.

== Printing and typesetting ==
The printing process in the early years of the newspaper required the type be set by hand and the press was manually operated by two men. One hundred pages, front and back, were produced per hour. Heavy metals were often used during the printing process. Soon after, the Chronicle began using a cylinder press, requiring one employee; the company upgraded to a Pelton wheel which turned the system by water pressure. By 1966, the Daily Chronicle used a rotary press, able to produce 18,000 pages per 60 minutes. Printing inks and materials were recycled and typesetting was completed electronically.

== Content ==
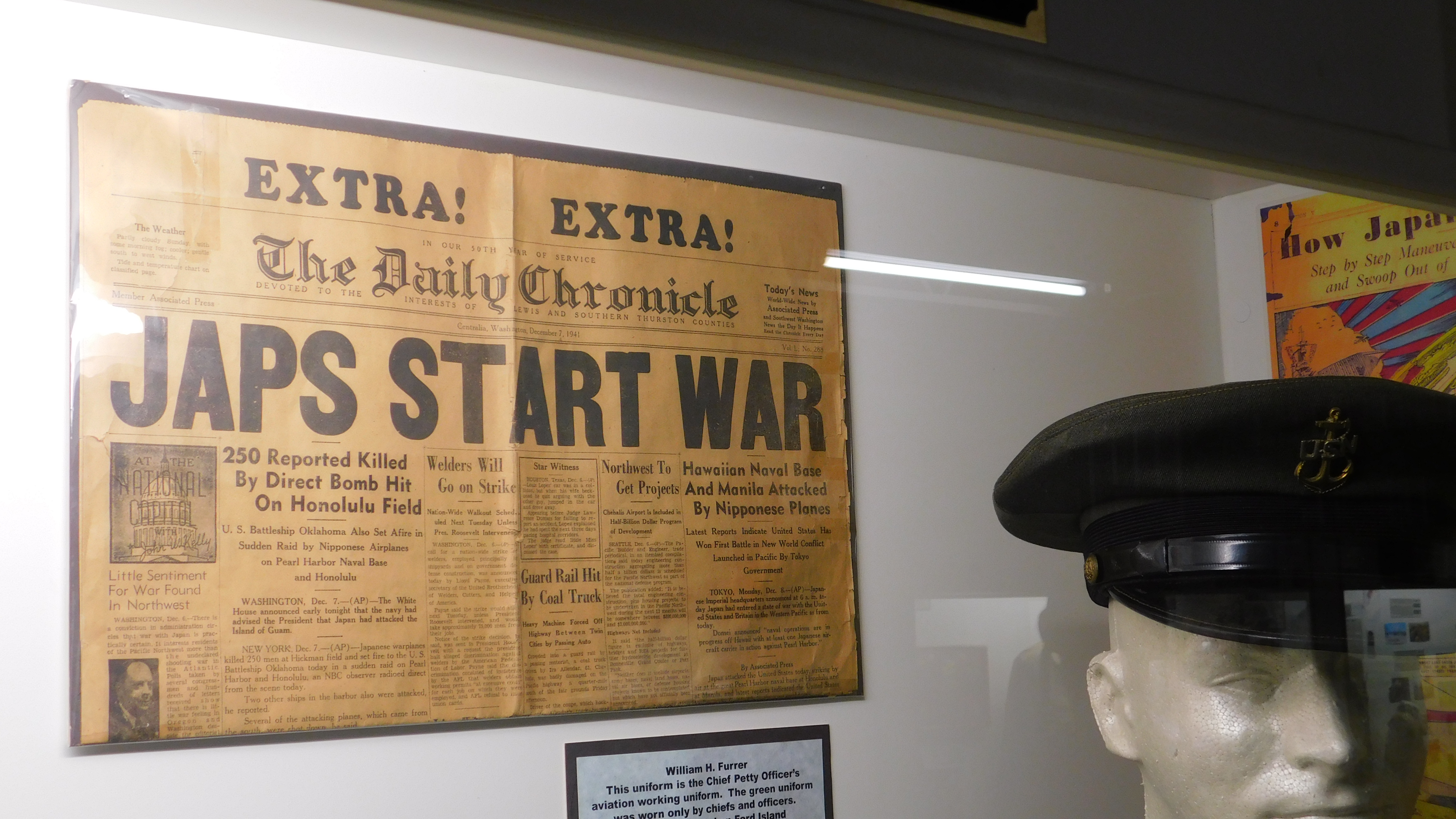
The Daily Chronicle, front page, December 7, 1941

The Chronicle ran a column, "I Was Just Thinking..." by Bill Moeller, a former mayor and city council member of Centralia. The column began in 2008 and recorded over 700 appearances in the newspaper. The articles were often based on Moeller's observations, experiences, and opinions living in the Hub City and Lewis County, as well as personal anecdotes and history. Moeller submitted articles past the age of 95; his last column was printed a year before his death in September 2024.

The business section was overseen by editor George Blomdahl beginning in 1979 after serving as a reporter for The Chronicle since 1954. Blomdahl, who died at the age of 84 in February 2008, was also a lay minister as well as a coroner for the county.

== Awards ==
The Chronicle's journalists have earned several awards from the Society of Professional Journalists' Northwest Excellence in Journalism Contests in recent years, including first place for comprehensive coverage from 2018, first place for spot news photography from 2019 and 2022, runner-up for environmental and natural disaster reporting in 2019 and 2022, and runner-up for breaking news in 2022. In 2014, a reporter from The Chronicle was named New Journalist of the Year by the Society of Professional Journalists' Western Washington chapter.

== See also ==
- List of newspapers in Washington (state)
