= Packwood =

Packwood may refer to:

== People ==
- Packwood (surname)

== Places ==
- Packwood, California, former town
- Packwood, Iowa, city
- Packwood, Washington, unincorporated community
  - Packwood Dam, located nearby
  - Packwood Lake, impounded by the dam
- Packwood Glacier, Washington
- Packwood Creek, California
- Packwood, England, a village in the counties of the West Midlands and Warwickshire
  - Packwood House, Tudor mansion in England owned by the National Trust
