= Tieton River =

Tieton River North Fork Tieton River, Shanwappum (Yakama), Tai-Tin (Cowlitz)
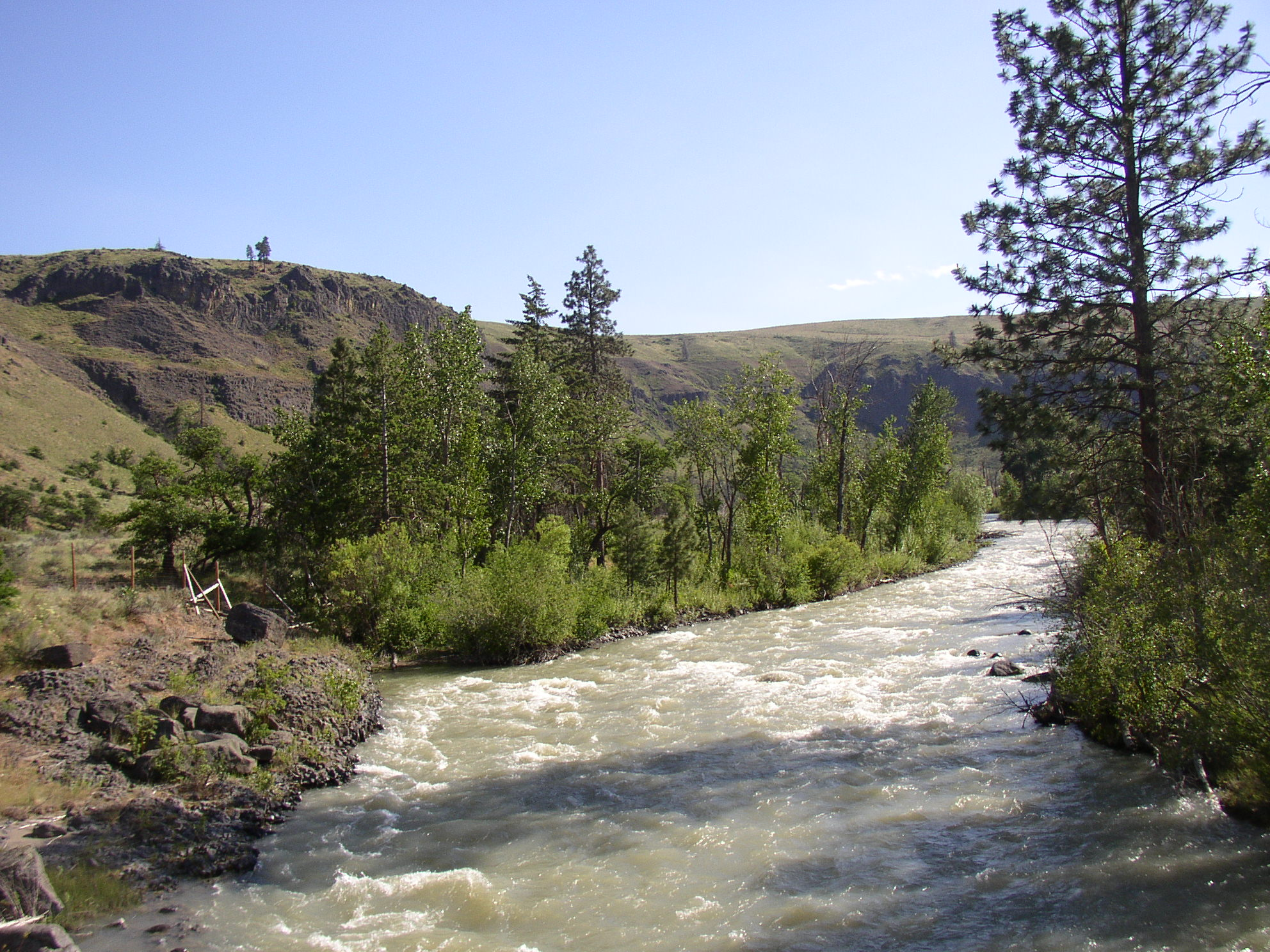

- Mouth of the Tieton River in Washington

Location
- Country: United States
- State: Washington
- Region: Yakima County

Physical characteristics
- Source: North Fork Tieton River
  - location: Cascade Range, McCall Glacier, Goat Rocks Wilderness
  - coordinates: 46°30′27″N 121°26′11″W
  - elevation: 6,246 ft (1,904 m)
- Mouth: Naches River
  - coordinates: 46°44′46″N 120°47′12″W
  - elevation: 1,601 ft (488 m)
- Length: 33 mi (53 km)

Basin features
- Tributaries
  - right: South Fork Tieton River

The Tieton River is a tributary of the Naches River, in Yakima County, Washington in the United States.

The Tieton River begins in two forks, the North Fork Tieton River and South Fork Tieton River. The North Fork originates at McCall Glacier on the eastern sides of Old Snowy Mountain, Ives Peak, and the Goat Rocks for which the Goat Rocks Wilderness is named. Collecting headwater streams from other high mountains such as Tieton Peak, the North Fork flows northeast into Clear Lake, then into the west end of Rimrock Lake. The South Fork Tieton River begins at Meade Glacier on the eastern side of Gilbert Peak, also part of the Goat Rocks. The South Fork collects many streams as it flows generally north, entering Rimrock Lake near its east end.

Rimrock Lake is an artificial reservoir created by Tieton Dam and managed by the U.S. Bureau of Reclamation. The lake stores water for irrigation use as part of the Bureau of Reclamation's Yakima Project. The Tieton River proper flows out of Rimrock Lake at Tieton Dam. It flows generally east, joining the Naches River near the town of Tieton.

== See also ==
- List of rivers of Washington (state)
- List of tributaries of the Columbia River
- U.S. Route 12 in Washington
- White Pass (Washington)
