= Big Horn (Washington) =

Mountain in Washington state, United States

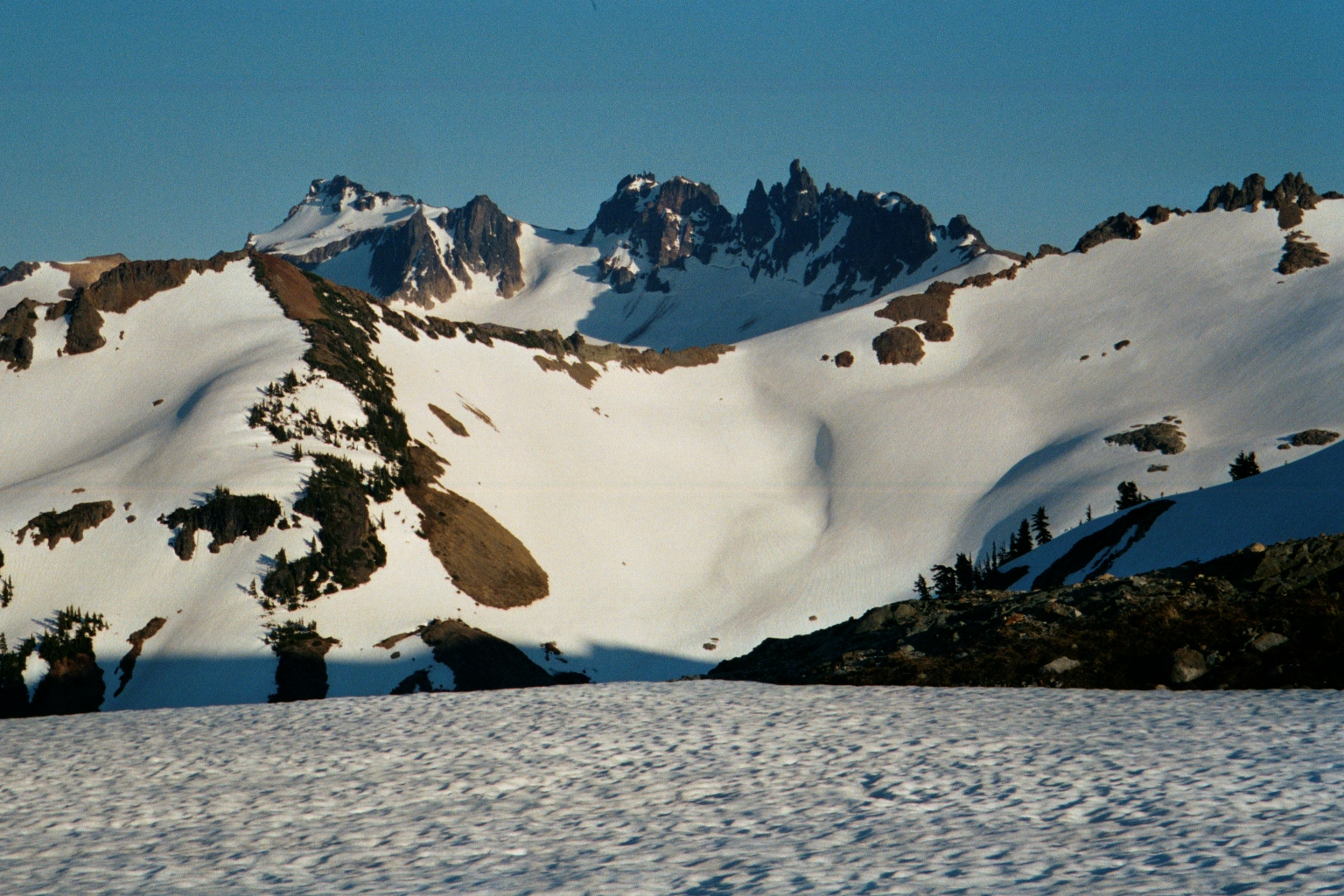
- Big Horn is the highest spire on the right

Highest point
- Elevation: 8,000+ feet (2,440+ m)
- Prominence: 240 ft (70 m)
- Coordinates: 46°29′33″N 121°25′23″W

Geography
- Location: Lewis / Yakima counties, Washington, U.S.
- Parent range: Cascade Range
- Topo map: USGS Walupt Lake

Climbing
- Easiest route: Steep scramble over very loose rock, class 3s4

Big Horn is a tall peak in the Cascade Range in the U.S. state of Washington. This officially unnamed peak is the highest point in Lewis County. Big Horn, one of the Goat Rocks, is the second highest point on the ridge west of Gilbert Peak, in the Goat Rocks Wilderness. It is just west of the highest point on the ridge, called Goat Citadel. It is said to be the most difficult pitch on the easiest routes of Washington's 39 county high points. There is a 10-foot (3.0 m) vertical crack near Big Horn's summit. Fred Beckey rates this pitch as a difficult class 4.

== See also ==
- List of geographic features in Lewis County, Washington
