= Tieton Peak =

Mountain in Washington, United States

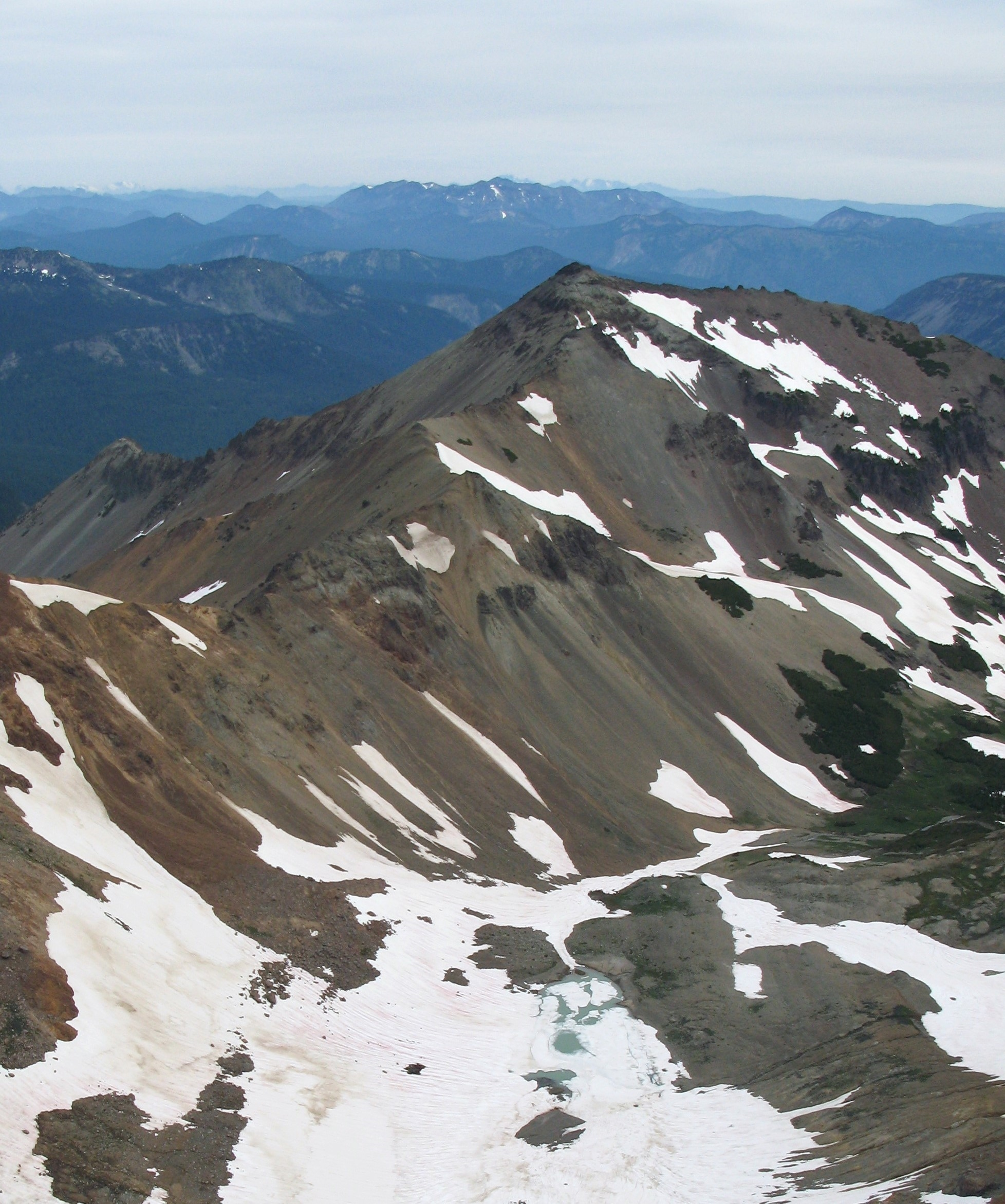
- Southwest aspect, viewed from Gilbert Peak

Highest point
- Elevation: 7,768 ft (2,368 m)
- Prominence: 728 ft (222 m)
- Parent peak: Gilbert Peak
- Isolation: 1.74 mi (2.80 km)
- Coordinates: 46°30′43″N 121°23′42″W

Geography
- Location within Washington (state) Location within the United States
- Country: United States
- State: Washington
- County: Yakima
- Protected area: Goat Rocks Wilderness
- Parent range: Cascades
- Topo map: USGS Old Snowy Mountain

Geology
- Rock age: 3.2 million - ~500,000 years
- Mountain type: Extinct stratovolcano
- Volcanic arc: Cascade Volcanic Arc
- Last eruption: ~500,000 years ago

Climbing
- Easiest route: Southwest ridge

Tieton Peak is a 7,768-foot-elevation (2,368-meter) mountain summit in Yakima County of Washington state.

== Description ==
Tieton Peak is set in the Goat Rocks Wilderness on land administered by the Wenatchee National Forest. It is the fourth-highest point in the Goat Rocks and fifth-highest in Yakima County. Tieton Peak is situated two miles east of the crest of the Cascade Range and the nearest higher peak is Gilbert Peak, 1.75 mi (2.82 km) to the south-southwest. The town of Tieton is 33 mi (53 km) to the east-northeast. Precipitation runoff from the peak's north slope drains into North Fork Tieton River, whereas the south slope drains into Conrad Creek which is a tributary of the South Fork Tieton River. Topographic relief is significant as the summit rises 3,800 feet (1,200 meters) above the North Fork in 1.3 mile (2.1 km) and 2,200 feet (670 meters) above Conrad Creek in one mile (1.6 km). "Tieton" (/ˈtaɪ.ətən/) is a Native American word which means "roaring water." The mountain's toponym has been officially adopted by the United States Board on Geographic Names.

== Climate ==
Most weather fronts originate in the Pacific Ocean, and travel northeast toward the Cascade Mountains. As fronts approach, they are forced upward by the peaks of the Cascade Range (orographic lift), causing them to drop their moisture in the form of rain or snowfall onto the Cascades. As a result, the east side of the Cascades experiences less precipitation than the west side of the crest. During winter months, weather is usually cloudy, but due to high pressure systems over the Pacific Ocean that intensify during summer months, there is often little or no cloud cover during the summer.

== See also ==
- List of mountain peaks of Washington (state)
- Goat Rocks
