= Walupt Lake =

Freshwater lake in the Cascade Mountains of Washington

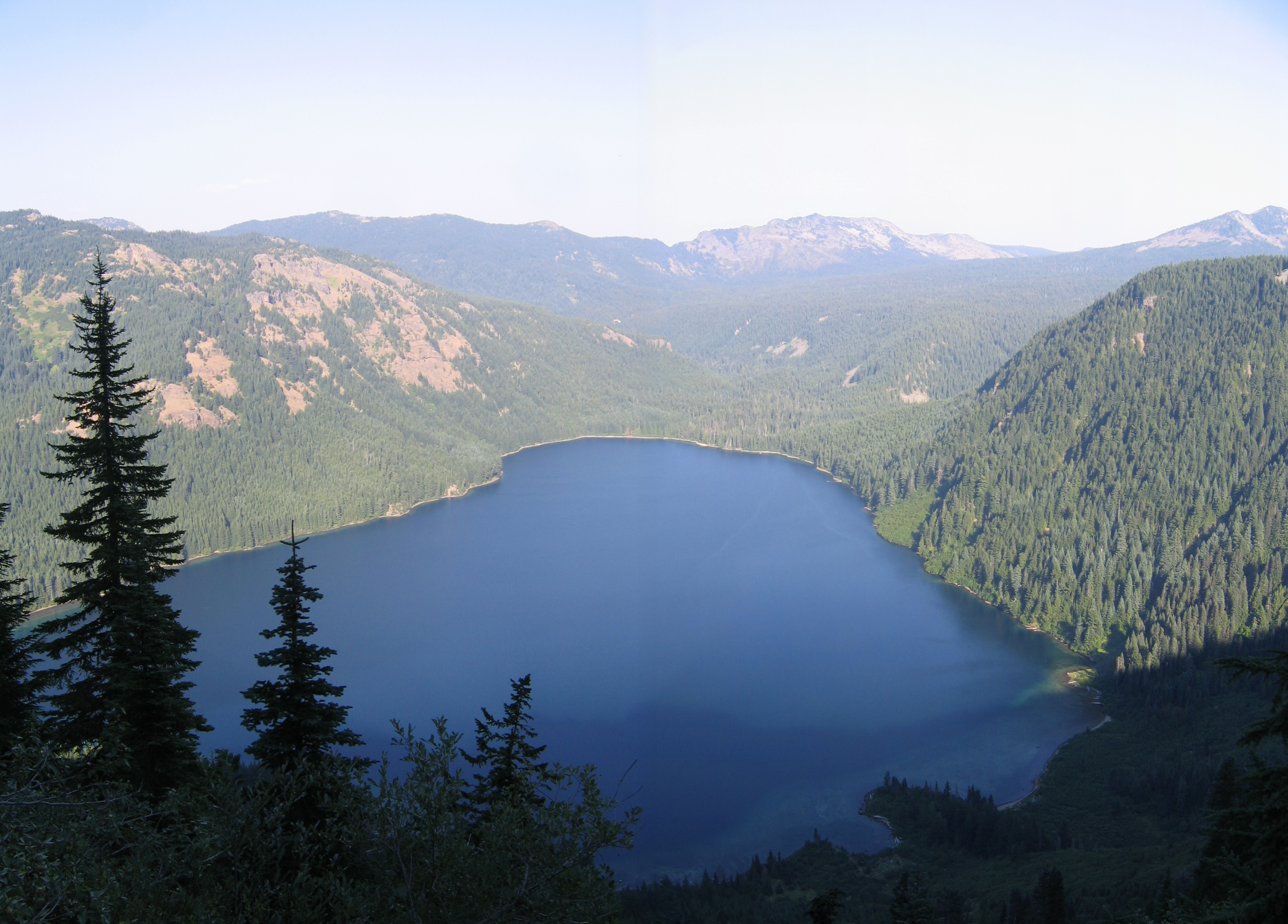
- View of Walupt Lake from above on the southwest rim of the valley

- Location within Washington (state)

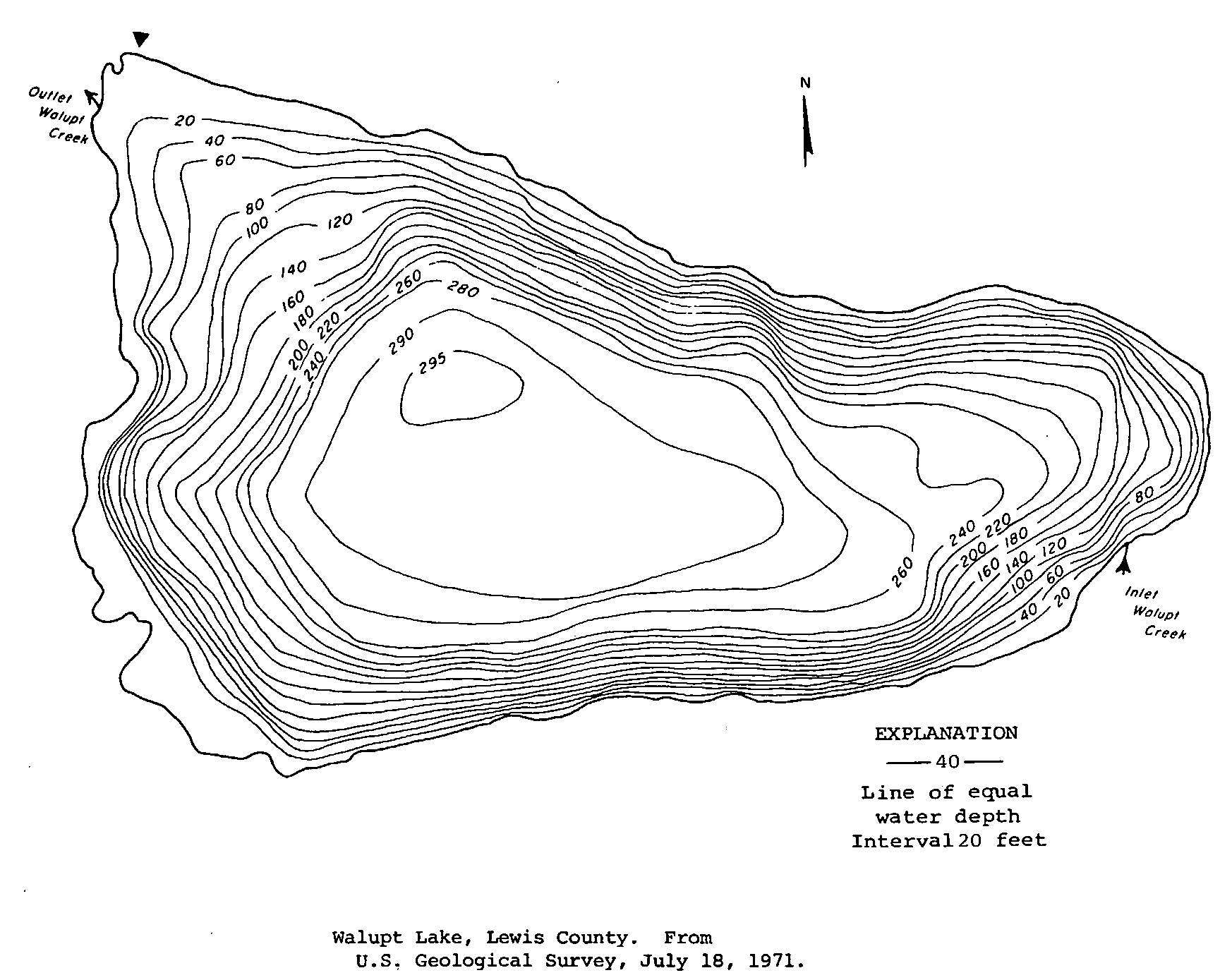
- Location: Lewis County, Washington; Goat Rocks
- Coordinates: 46°25′01″N 121°27′47″W
- Type: Tarn
- Part of: Cispus River
- Primary inflows: Walupt Creek
- Primary outflows: Walupt Creek
- Catchment area: 13.7 square miles (35 km^{2})
- Managing agency: United States Forest Service
- Designation: Partial wilderness area
- Max. length: 6,475 feet (1,974 m)
- Max. width: 4,140 feet (1,260 m)
- Surface area: 384 acres (155 ha)
- Average depth: 180 feet (55 m)
- Max. depth: 300 feet (91 m)
- Water volume: 62,000 acre-feet (76,000,000 m^{3})
- Shore length^{1}: 3.4 miles (5.5 km)
- Surface elevation: 3,930 feet (1,200 m)
- ^{1} Shore length is not a well-defined measure.

Walupt Lake is a large freshwater lake located in the Gifford Pinchot National Forest in the Cascade Mountains of Washington. It is located near the town of Packwood and is popular for camping, boating, and hiking. The eastern half of the lake is within the Goat Rocks Wilderness. It is the deepest and second largest natural lake in Lewis County.

== Hydrology ==
Walupt Lake is a ribbon lake situated near the end of a long glacial valley at an elevation of 3,930 feet (1,200 m). The main inflow to Walupt Lake is the perennial, snowmelt-fed Walupt Creek, which flows out of a long valley into the east end of the lake. Other small streamlets flow into the lake from the steep valley walls above. The lake's watershed encompasses 13.7 square miles (35 km^{2}) of land in the southern Goat Rocks. Besides the lake itself, the watershed comprises forest and otherwise unproductive land.

Walupt Creek is also the lake's outflow, exiting the lake on its northwestern corner. The lake is somewhat boot-shaped with the toe pointed up the valley to the east. The widest part of the lake is on the western end at 4,140 feet (1,260 m), and the longest part is the southern third at 6,475 feet (1,974 m). The lake, with an area of 384 acres (155 ha), is the second largest lake in the Goat Rocks Wilderness next to Packwood Lake. Walupt Lake has an average depth of 180 feet (55 m) and is the deepest lake in Lewis County; it is also one of the deepest in Washington state with a maximum depth of 300 feet (91 m). The lake holds about 62,000 acre-feet (76,000,000 m^{3}) of water, putting it among the top 25 lakes in Washington by volume.

Walupt Lake was created by an ancient landslide when the ridge on the northwest end slid down and created a natural dam.

== History ==
Indigenous tribes, particularly the Cowlitz, Klickitat, and Yakama, used Walupt Lake for fishing and hunting with anthropological and archaeological studies suggesting the lands had been inhabited by Native Americans for over 7,000 years.

Surveyor Albert Hale Sylvester first assigned the name Walupt to the lake. The name is of Yakama origin, and Sylvester learned from Native Americans that Walupt was the Yakama name for the region. According to legend, a great Yakama hunter pursued a mighty deer for many days until finally the deer led him to the lake. The deer jumped in, swam around for a while, and then disappeared. Since then, any hunter whose chase leads to Walupt Lakee will sometimes see the deer swimming in the lake.

== Recreation ==
The eastern half of Walupt Lake is within the Goat Rocks Wilderness of the Gifford Pinchot National Forest. Walupt Lake Campground is a popular campground and day use area on the west end of the lake with 42 primitive sites and a boat ramp. The campground is also a popular access point for the Goat Rocks Wilderness. While very little of the surrounding countryside is visible from the lake, once on the ridges above the lake, a hiker can see the surrounding Goat Rocks, Mount Adams off to the south and Mount Rainier to the northwest. The Nannie Ridge Trail #98 and Walupt Lake Trail #101 both start at the eastern end of the campground and provide different views of the wilderness and surrounding area on the way to their respective junctions with the Pacific Crest National Scenic Trail.

== See also ==
- List of geographic features in Lewis County, Washington
- List of lakes in Washington
- Walupt Creek Falls
