= Ives Peak =

Mountain in Washington (state), United States

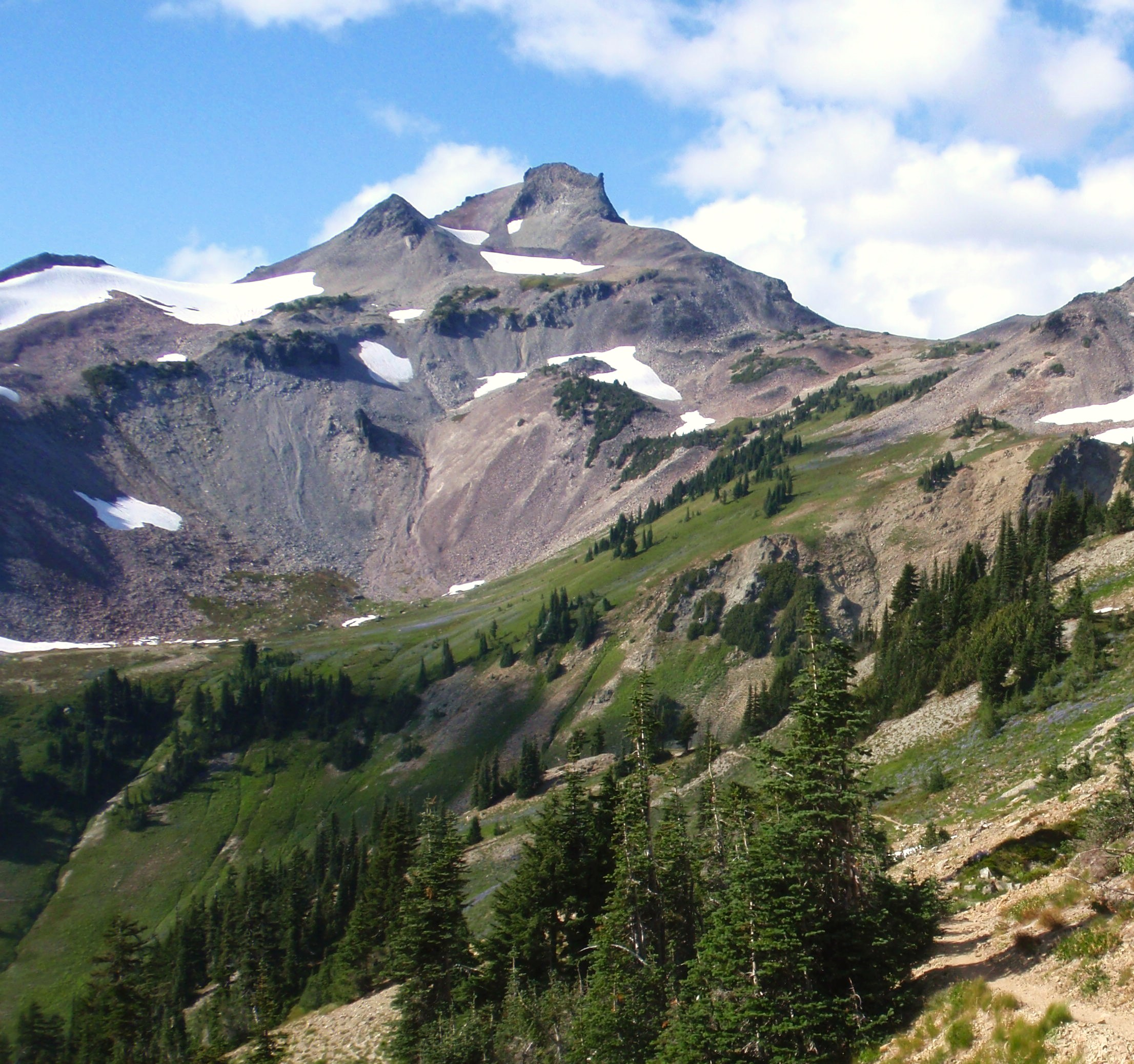
- South aspect

Highest point
- Elevation: 7,920+ ft (2,410+ m)
- Prominence: 760 ft (230 m)
- Coordinates: 46°30′11″N 121°26′49″W

Geography
- Location within Washington (state) Location within the United States
- Location: Goat Rocks, Washington, U.S.
- Parent range: Cascade Range
- Topo map: USGS Old Snowy Mountain

Geology
- Mountain type: Stratovolcano

Climbing
- Easiest route: Scramble

Ives Peak, elevation 7,920+ ft (2,410+ m), is located in the Goat Rocks on the border of Lewis and Yakima Counties, in the U.S. state of Washington. Ives Peak is within the Goat Rocks Wilderness and the McCall Glacier on its eastern slopes. Additionally, the Pacific Crest National Scenic Trail is near the west slopes of the peak. Precipitation runoff from the peak's east slope drains to the Tieton River, whereas the west slope drains into the Cispus River. Ives Peak ranks as the fourth-highest peak in the Goat Rocks Wilderness.

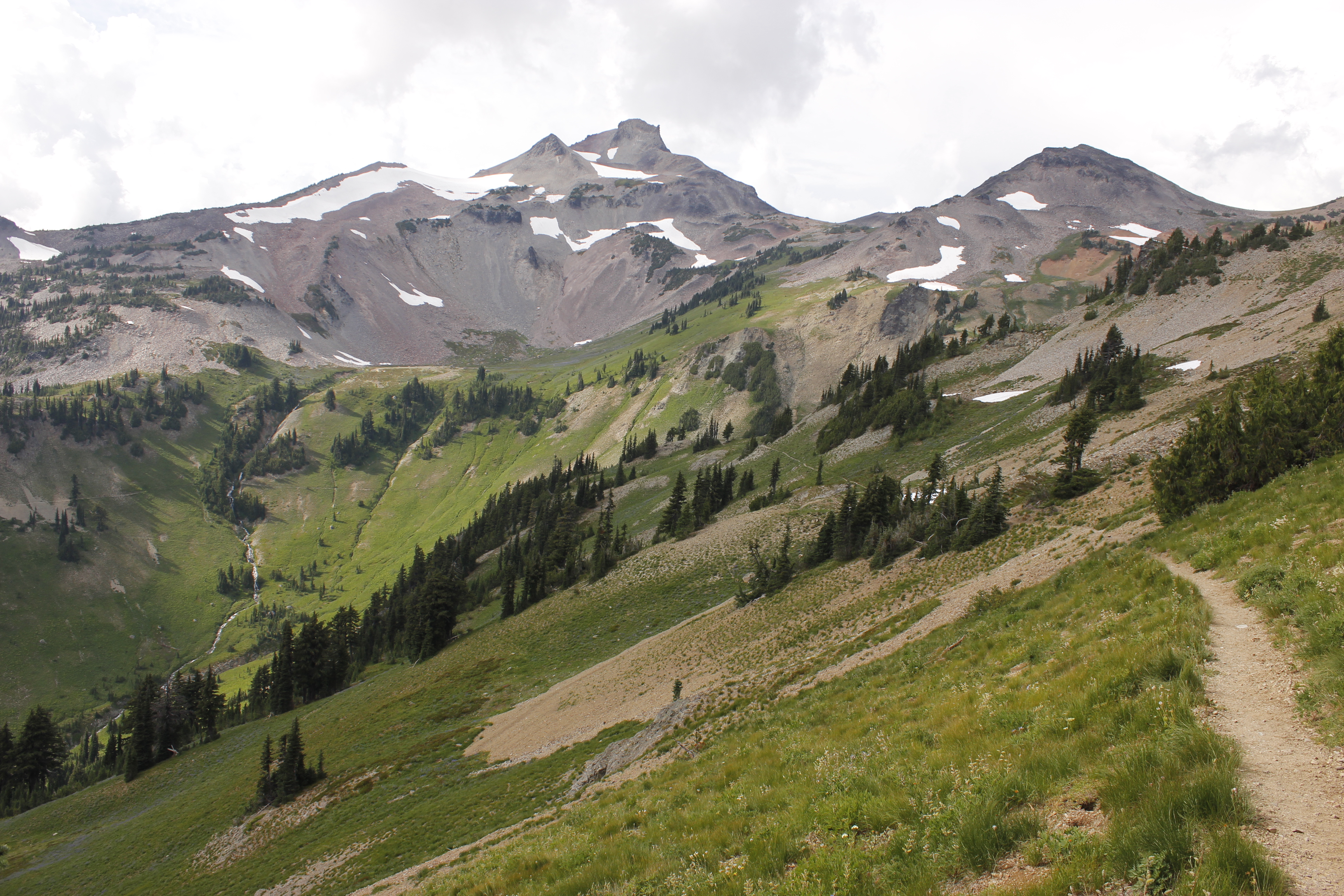
Ives Peak, 2013

== See also ==
- List of geographic features in Lewis County, Washington
- List of mountain peaks of Washington (state)
