= Packwood Lake =

Freshwater lake in the Cascade Mountains of Washington

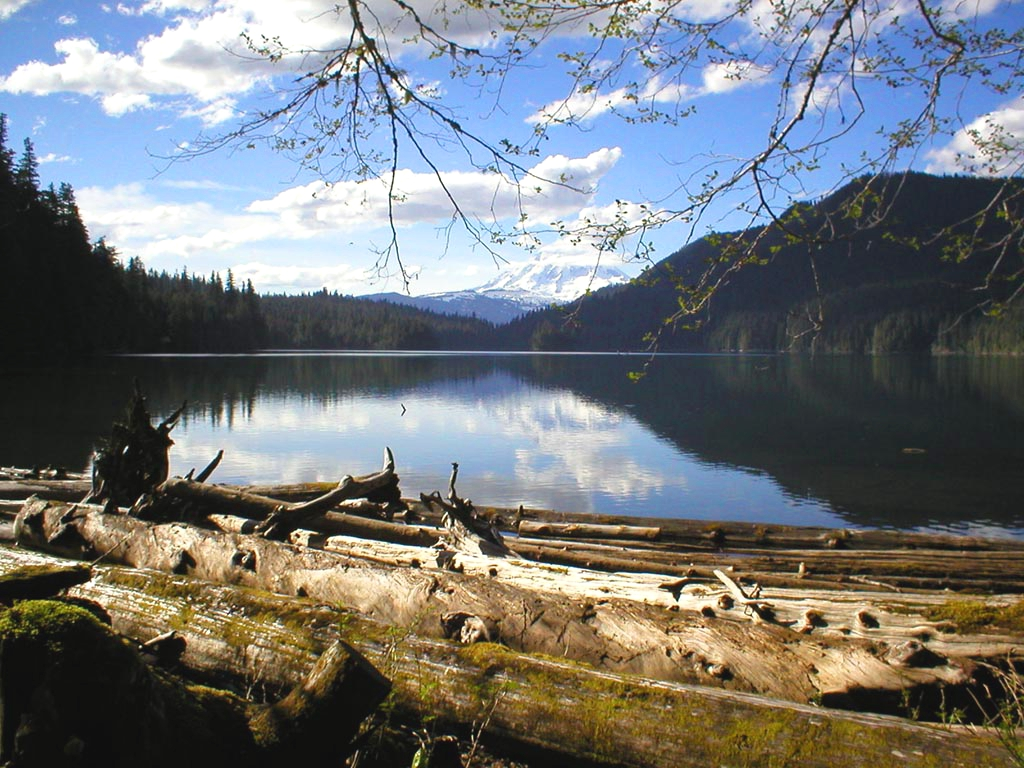
- Mount Rainier from the southeast end of the lake

- Location within Washington (state) Location within the United States
- Location: Lewis County, Washington
- Coordinates: 46°35′9″N 121°33′32″W
- Primary inflows: Upper and Lower Lake Creeks
- Basin countries: United States
- Max. length: 2 mi (3.2 km) approx
- Max. width: 0.6 mi (0.97 km) approx)
- Surface area: 452 acres (183 ha)
- Max. depth: 160 ft (49 m)
- Surface elevation: 2,857 ft (871 m)
- Islands: 1 (Wizard Island or Enchantment Island)
- References: Geographic Names Information System: 1524134

Packwood Lake is a freshwater lake in the Gifford Pinchot National Forest in the Cascade Mountains of Washington. It is located near the town of Packwood and is a popular day hiking and overnight camping area. The southern half of the lake lies within the Goat Rocks Wilderness area.

The lake was named after William Packwood, an early settler.

== Geography and hydrology ==
Packwood Lake, at 452 acres (183 ha), is the largest lake in Goat Rocks Wilderness, and lies at 2,857 feet (871 m) above sea level, approximately 25 miles (40 km) southeast of Mount Rainier in Lewis County. Its main source of water is glacier-fed Upper and Lower Lake Creeks, which descend from Old Snowy Mountain. The lake is approximately 2 miles (3.2 km) long and 0.6 miles (0.97 km) wide.

The lake is held in place by a natural dam. Approximately 1,200 years ago, Snyder Mountain, which borders the lake to the northwest, broke and slid down into the (then) Lake Creek valley, effectively plugging it and forming the lake. Maximum depth is approximately 160 feet (49 m). The island in the lake is officially named Agnes Island, and also referred to by locals as both Wizard Island or Enchantment Island. The island is protected by the U.S. Forest Service and no landings are permitted there.

== Biology ==
Packwood Lake is home to a genetically distinct species of rainbow trout. This trout has evolved for over a thousand years, separated from other populations of fish. It is known for its excellent taste, large size, and drab creamy coloring. Due to many years of stocking, however, the fish is becoming less and less prominent as its gene pool becomes diluted by stocked fish.

Also calling this lake home are several species of birds, including heron, bald eagle, and wood duck. Black bears are also fairly common, as are deer, elk, raccoon, cougar, and (in the higher elevations above the lake) mountain goats.

== History ==
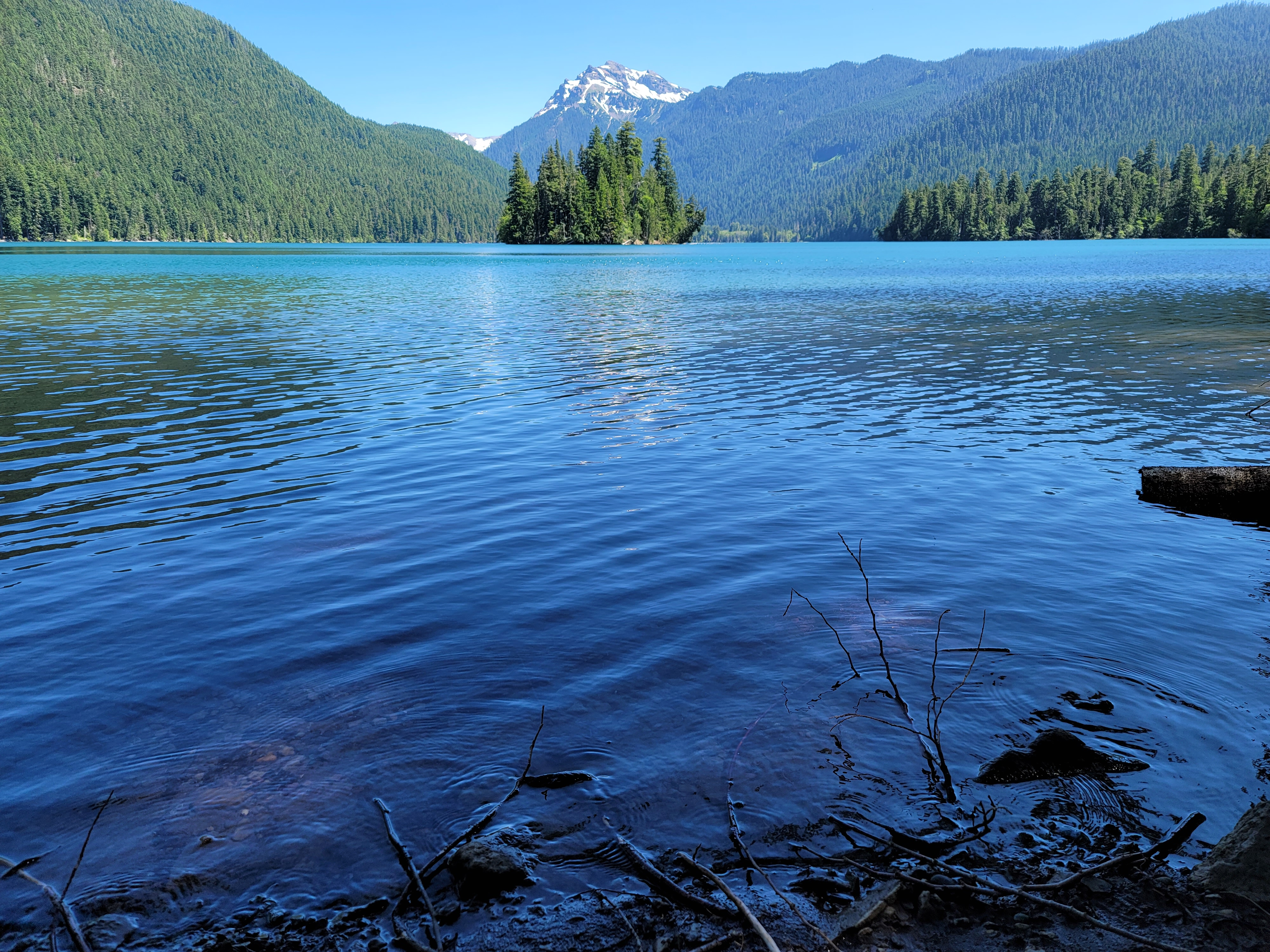
Packwood Lake from the Northwest Shore, viewing Johnson Peak and Agnes Island

Packwood Lake has been used for several thousand years by Native Americans as summer quarters and hunting territory. Due to extremely cold winters and subsequent heavy snows, the area is considered largely uninhabitable during the winter.

The lake was named after William Packwood, an early settler. Prospectors thoroughly searched the area of the lake in the early 1920s. Although some gold and silver was found, the small quantities and remoteness of the area proved mining to be not economical.

== Packwood Dam ==
Packwood Lake was dammed in 1964 to produce electricity. There is a small 27-megawatt dam at the foot of the lake which has taken over the job of holding back the lake from the Snyder Mountain landslide. Great care was used when designing and building the dam so as not to affect the abundant wildlife that calls the lake and surrounding area home. The actual dam structure is only a couple of feet tall, creating only a small holding pond which feeds the penstock.

Water from Packwood Lake is also piped to the town of Packwood and supplies the greater Packwood area.

== Recreation ==
Packwood lake is a popular hiking destination for both day hikers and campers. The trail leading to the lake, Packwood Lake Trail #78, is also a popular entrance to the Goat Rocks Wilderness and surrounding area. The lake is also used as a stopping ground for travellers headed to Mosquito and Lost Lakes to the north, and Gilbert Peak to the southeast.

An all-terrain vehicle trail (the 'low trail') was completed some years ago and offers ATV and horse access to the lake. The 'upper trail' is reserved for hikers and horses. Both trails, upper and lower, are approximately 5 miles (8 km) to the lake from a well-maintained and paved parking lot. Continuing past the lake, hikers are offered hundreds of miles of trails covering breathtaking scenery, and the Pacific Crest Trail may be reached about 7 miles (11.3 km) beyond the lake.

The lake itself is a very popular fishing hole and may be fished from shore or paddle boat (motors are prohibited). Additionally, fishing with a two-pole endorsement is not allowed.

== See also ==
- List of geographic features in Lewis County, Washington
- List of lakes in Washington
- Walupt Lake
