= Meade Glacier =

Glacier in the state of Washington

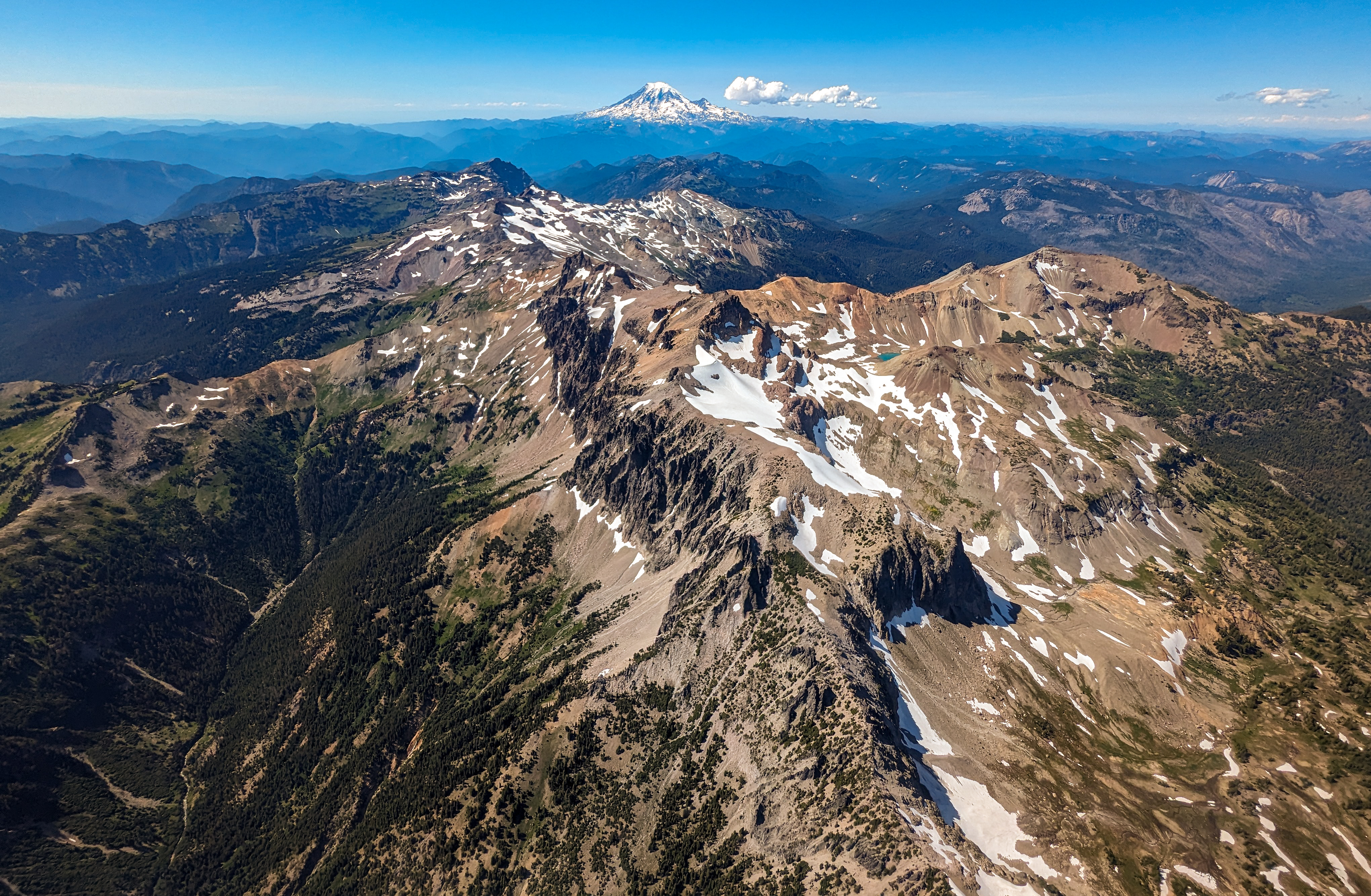
- Meade Glacier on the near slopes of Gilbert Peak (center)

- Location within Washington (state)
- Type: Mountain glacier
- Location: Gilbert Peak, Yakima County, Washington, USA
- Coordinates: 46°29′08″N 121°24′03″W
- Length: .15 mi (0.24 km)
- Terminus: Barren rock
- Status: Retreating

Meade Glacier is located in the Goat Rocks region in the U.S. state of Washington. The glacier is within the Goat Rocks Wilderness of Snoqualmie National Forest, .25 mi (0.40 km) south of Conrad Glacier and immediately east of Gilbert Peak. Meade Glacier is split into three sections and the lower ablation zone at 6,400 ft (2,000 m) is not connected to the upper accumulation zone at 7,800 ft (2,400 m).

== See also ==
- List of glaciers in the United States
