= Packwood (surname) =

Packwood is a surname. Notable people with the surname include:

- Allen George Packwood, Director of the Churchill Archives Centre
- Bob Packwood (1932–2026), United States senator from Oregon
- Gene Packwood, artist and political cartoonist
- Kelly Packwood (born 1986), Welsh international lawn & indoor bowler
- Kerry Packwood (born 1986), Welsh international lawn & indoor bowler
- Joshua Packwood, first white valedictorian of Morehouse College
- Will Packwood (born 1993), American soccer player
- William Packwood (1832–1917), American politician
