= Gene Packwood =

American political cartoonist

Gene Packwood is an artist and political cartoonist. He covered the Korean War in sketches and did political cartoons for a newspaper in Leesburg, Florida.

His father was an editor and publisher. In 1998, the Lake Eustis Museum of Art exhibited 200 of his cartoons.

He made a cartoon of Florida governor Lawton Chiles axeing turkeys representing line item veto items.
