= Walupt Creek Falls =

Waterfall in Washington (state), United States

- Interactive map of Walupt Creek Falls
- Location: Lewis County, Washington, United States
- Coordinates: 46°25′53″N 121°29′52″W
- Type: Fan
- Elevation: 3,500 feet (1,100 m)
- Total height: 221 feet (67.4 m)
- Number of drops: 3
- Average width: 204 feet (62 m)
- Watercourse: Walupt Creek
- Average flow rate: 150 cubic feet (4.2 m^{3})

Walupt Creek Falls is a 221 feet (67 m)-tall waterfall on Walupt Creek, a large tributary of the Cispus River in Lewis County, Washington.

== Description ==
Walupt Creek Falls cascade 221 feet (67 m) down a bedrock cliff in two tiers, with an average breadth of 204 feet (62 m), a maximum breadth of 267 feet (81 m) and an average flow of over 150 cubic feet (4.2 m^{3}) per second. The first drop is a 10 feet (3.0 m) cascade, with a following 200 feet (61 m) fan fall that impacts a large, bell-shaped dome. Asmall, final drop is a gently sloping slide that flows directly into the Cispus River. The feeder river, Walupt Creek, is part of a large drainage basin sourced directly from Walupt Lake, which provides a consistent flow throughout the year.

The waterfall is situated at an elevation of 3,500 feet (1,100 m).

=== Upper Walupt Creek Falls ===
Shortly upstream, a series of cascades, 24 feet (7.3 m), 8 feet (2.4 m), and 29 feet (8.8 m) in height, respectively, form Upper Walupt Creek Falls.

== See also ==
- List of geographic features in Lewis County, Washington
