= McCall Glacier =

Glacier in the state of Washington

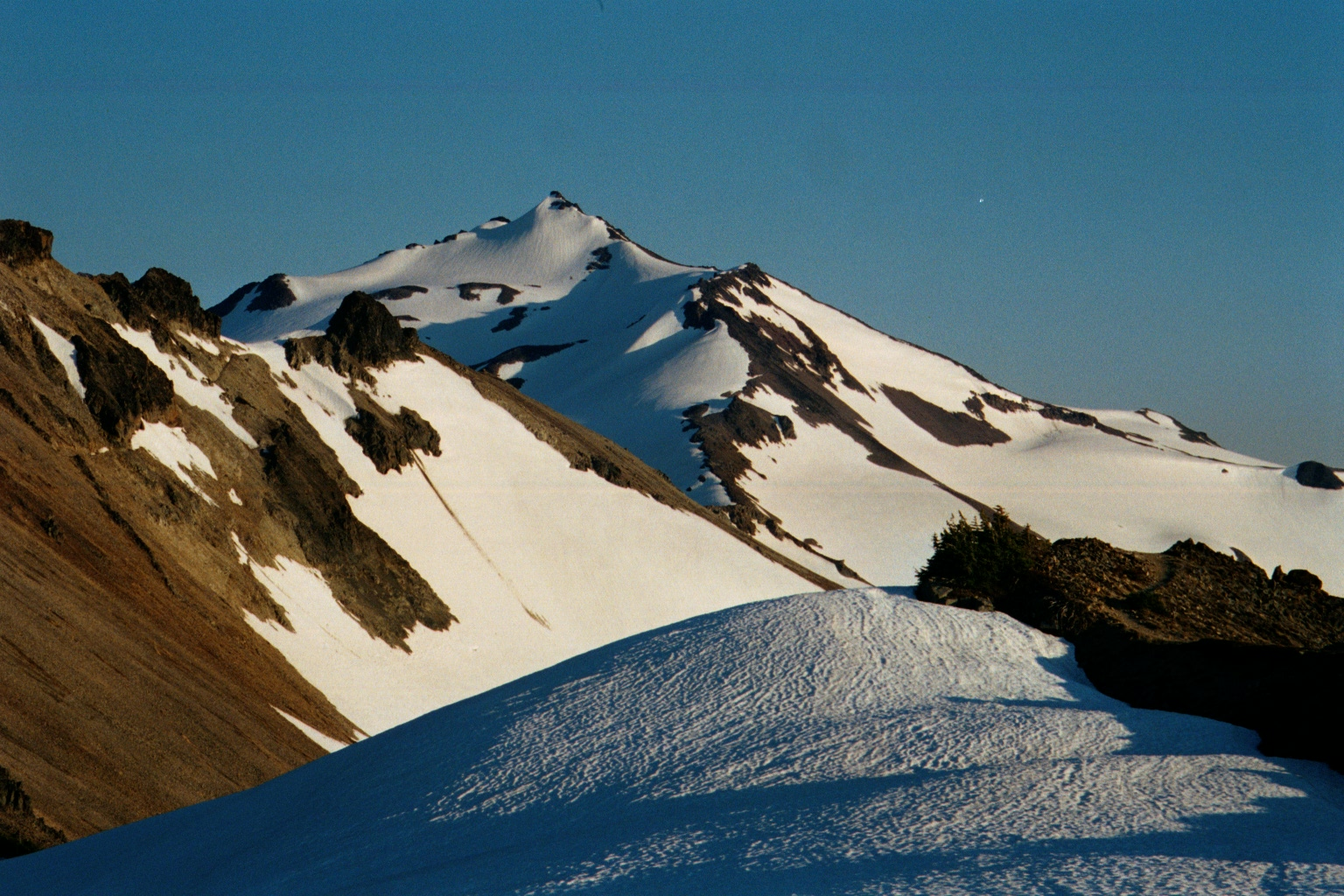
- McCall Glacier at upper left below the summit of Old Snowy Mountain at center

- Location within Washington (state)
- Type: Mountain glacier
- Location: Old Snowy Mountain, Yakima County, Washington, USA
- Coordinates: 46°29′59″N 121°26′12″W
- Length: .25 mi (0.40 km)
- Terminus: Barren rock
- Status: Retreating

McCall Glacier is located in the Goat Rocks region in the U.S. state of Washington. The glacier is near to the Pacific Crest National Scenic Trail and in the Goat Rocks Wilderness of Snoqualmie National Forest, .60 mi (0.97 km) southeast of Old Snowy Mountain. Packwood Glacier is .50 mi (0.80 km) to the west. Consisting of numerous small bodies of ice, the largest section of McCall Glacier is immediately east of Ives Peak (7,940 ft (2,420 m)).

== See also ==
- List of geographic features in Lewis County, Washington
- List of glaciers in the United States
