= Packwood Glacier =

Glacier in the state of Washington

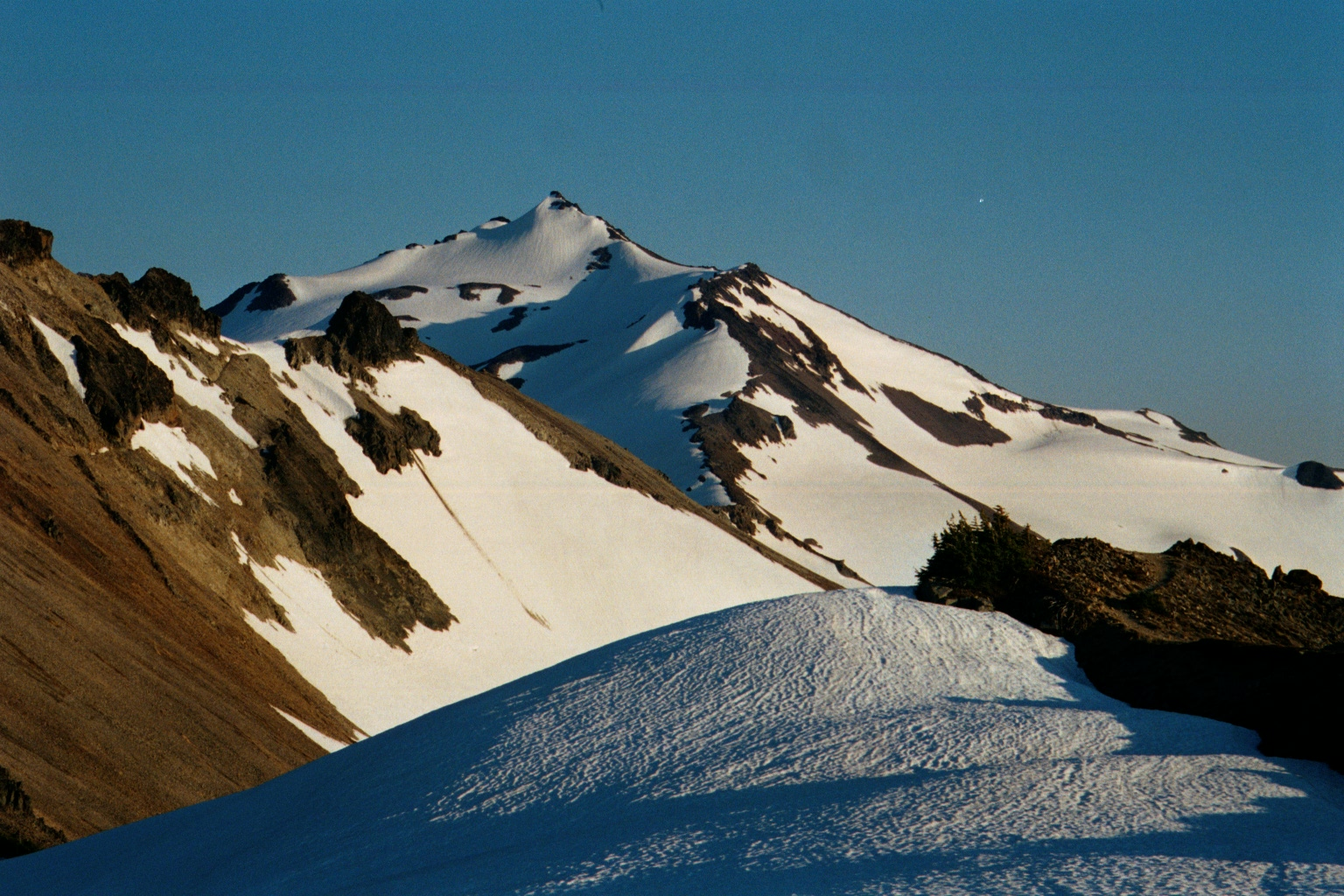
- Packwood Glacier is the snowy area on the right, below Old Snowy Mountain at center

- Location within Washington (state)
- Type: Mountain glacier
- Location: Old Snowy Mountain, Lewis County, Washington, USA
- Coordinates: 46°30′59″N 121°27′37″W
- Length: .10 mi (0.16 km)
- Terminus: Barren rock
- Status: Retreating

Packwood Glacier is located in the Goat Rocks region in the U.S. state of Washington. The glacier is adjacent to the Pacific Crest National Scenic Trail and in the Goat Rocks Wilderness of Gifford Pinchot National Forest, .30 mi (0.48 km) northwest of Old Snowy Mountain. McCall Glacier is .50 mi (0.80 km) to the east.

Like the town of Packwood, the Packwood Glacier is named in honor of William Packwood.

== See also ==
- List of geographic features in Lewis County, Washington
- List of glaciers in the United States
