= Goat Rocks =

Extinct stratovolcano in Washington, United States

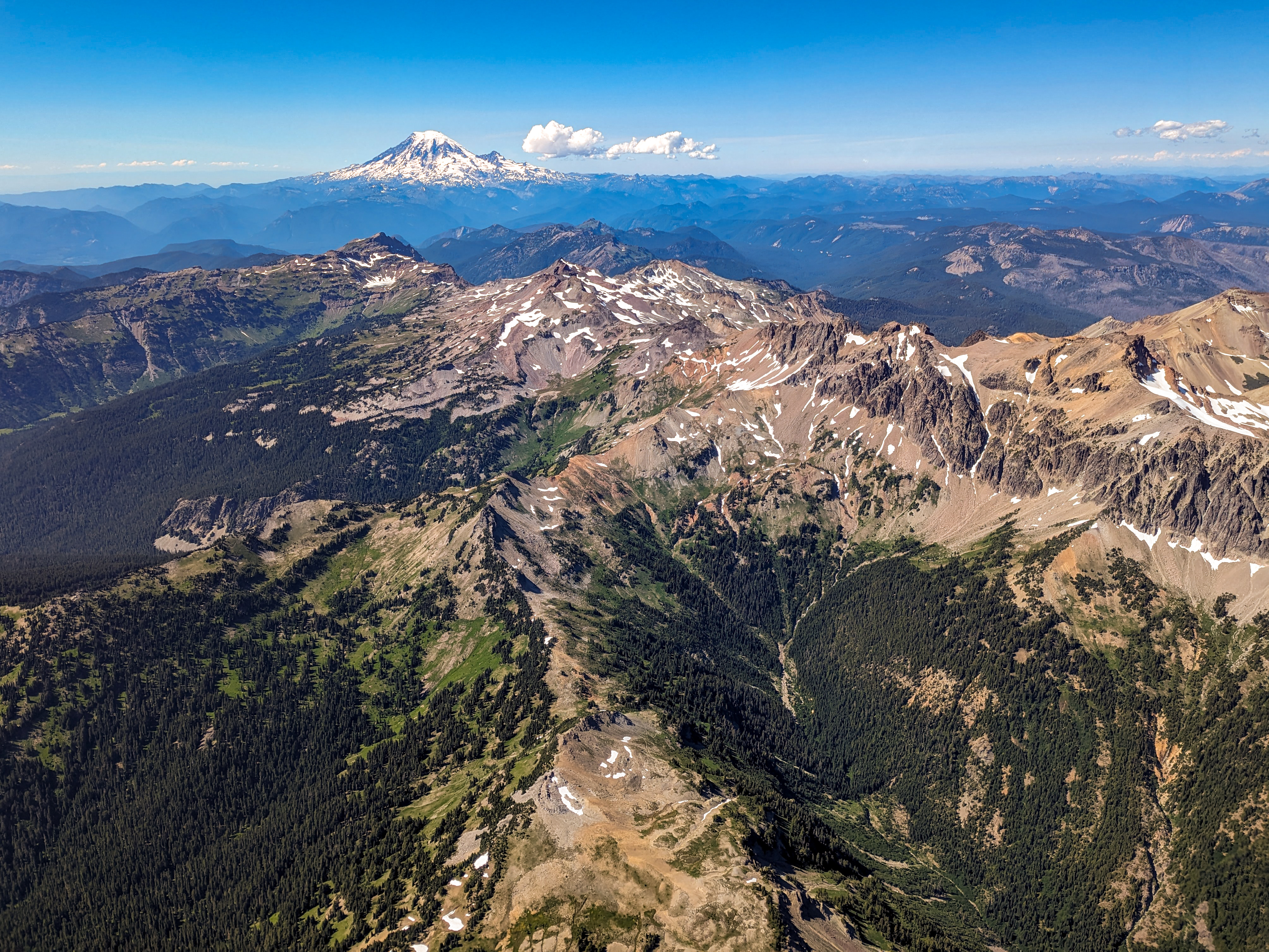
- The main ridge of Goat Rocks, (far to near) Old Snowy, Ives Peak, and Gilbert Peak (center) above Conrad Glacier and Meade Glacier

Highest point
- Elevation: 8,201 ft (2,500 m)
- Coordinates: 46°29′19″N 121°24′21″W

Geography
- Location: Lewis / Yakima counties, Washington, U.S.
- Parent range: Cascade Range
- Topo map(s): USGS Old Snowy Mountain, Walupt Lake

Geology
- Rock age: 3.2 million – ~500,000 years
- Mountain type: Extinct stratovolcano
- Volcanic arc: Cascade Volcanic Arc
- Last eruption: ~500,000 years ago

Climbing
- First ascent: Fred G. Plummer, 1899
- Easiest route: Scrambling

Goat Rocks is an extinct stratovolcano in the Cascade Range, located between Mount Rainier and Mount Adams in southern Washington, in the United States. Part of the Cascade Volcanoes, it was formed by the subduction of the Juan de Fuca Plate under the western edge of the North American Plate. The volcano was active from 3.2 million years ago until eruptions ceased between 1 and 0.5 million years ago. Throughout its complex eruptive history, volcanism shifted from silicic explosive eruptions to voluminous, mafic activity.

The volcano and the surrounding Goat Rocks Wilderness, established in 1964, are named after the numerous mountain goats which live in the area. The variable climate of the wilderness area supports a host of wildlife, including marmots, pikas, deer, and elk. Various peaks within the wilderness can be climbed or scrambled, and other activities such as hiking are permitted.

== Geography and geology ==
Goats Rocks volcano is located in southern Washington, 113 km (70 mi) west of Yakima, at latitude 46.50° N and longitude 121.45° W. This region of the Cascades was originally occupied by Native Americans, who hunted and fished in its vicinity and used its trails as trade routes. Goat Rocks lies in a zone of intermittent volcanism which has produced many small volcanic vents, also including the Mount Adams volcanic field and Indian Heaven. Situated in the eastern portion of the Cascade Range, Goat Rocks lies at the northwest corner of the Klickitat River basin. As a member of the Cascade Volcanoes, Goat Rocks was produced by the subduction of the oceanic Juan de Fuca plate under the western edge of the continental North American Plate. This fault, known as the Cascadia subduction zone, lacks the deep oceanic trench usually found at convergent plate boundaries, which can probably be explained by its slow rate of subduction. According to the United States Geological Survey, the Nazca and North American plates converge at a rate of 3 to 4 cm (1 to 2 in) each year, just half of their convergence rate as recently as 7 million years ago.

The Cascade Volcanoes in Washington are restricted to four belts; Goat Rocks forms one segment of the north–south trending Mount Adams belt that also incorporates Tumac Mountain, Adams, and the King Mountain Fissure Zone. Of the four Cascade arcs, this belt contains the second most volcanoes, and its volcanoes are predominantly made of calc-alkalic to tholeiitic to basaltic andesite lava. Goat Rocks and its immediate vicinity are underlain by pre-Tertiary greywacke and argillite, and these deposits are cut by several prominent northward-trending faults. Overlaying these deposits are Cenozoic volcanic rocks, including the thick, Eocene-aged Ohanapecosh Formation, comprised by chemically altered basalt and andesite lava flows and bedded andesite and dacite volcaniclastic rock. In turn, the Stevens Ridge Formation overlies the Ohanapecosh layer, featuring quartz-bearing silicic tuff, rhyolite, and other volcaniclastic rocks. Under both layers is the Russell Ranch Formation, 2,298 to 3,048 m (7,539 to 10,000 ft) in thickness, which contains deposits of lapilli and tuff hinting at a caldera, although geologists have failed to identify clear evidence for the formation of a caldera in this zone.

Together with Mount Adams, Mount Rainier, and Mount St. Helens, the Goat Rocks volcano is part of a triangle of volcanoes, an arrangement not found elsewhere in the Cascades. This may be related to a mid-crust zone with abnormally high electrical conductivity, the Southern Washington Cascades Conductor (SWCC), which is not well understood by geologists. Scientists from the United States Geodynamics Committee hypothesized in 1994 that this anomaly is associated with the thrust of a large deposit of sedimentary rock against a continental margin. However, Hill et al. (2009) dismiss this view as it proves inconsistent with maps made from magnetotelluric readings of the area. Instead, they propose that the anomaly is linked to the region's volcanism, which has caused partial melting of the crust.

The oldest Cascade stratovolcano formed after the Columbia River Basalt Group, Goat Rocks is roughly equal in volume to Mount St. Helens and smaller in volume than Mount Baker, at approximately 60 km^{3} (14 cu mi). Rough estimates place the composition of the volcano as 40% tuff and breccia. The remains of its lava flows can be found in the Tieton, Klickitat, and Cispus river valleys, their elevation reversed by erosion to make them resemble ridges. These flows have been thoroughly eroded, but testify to the volcano's previous size.

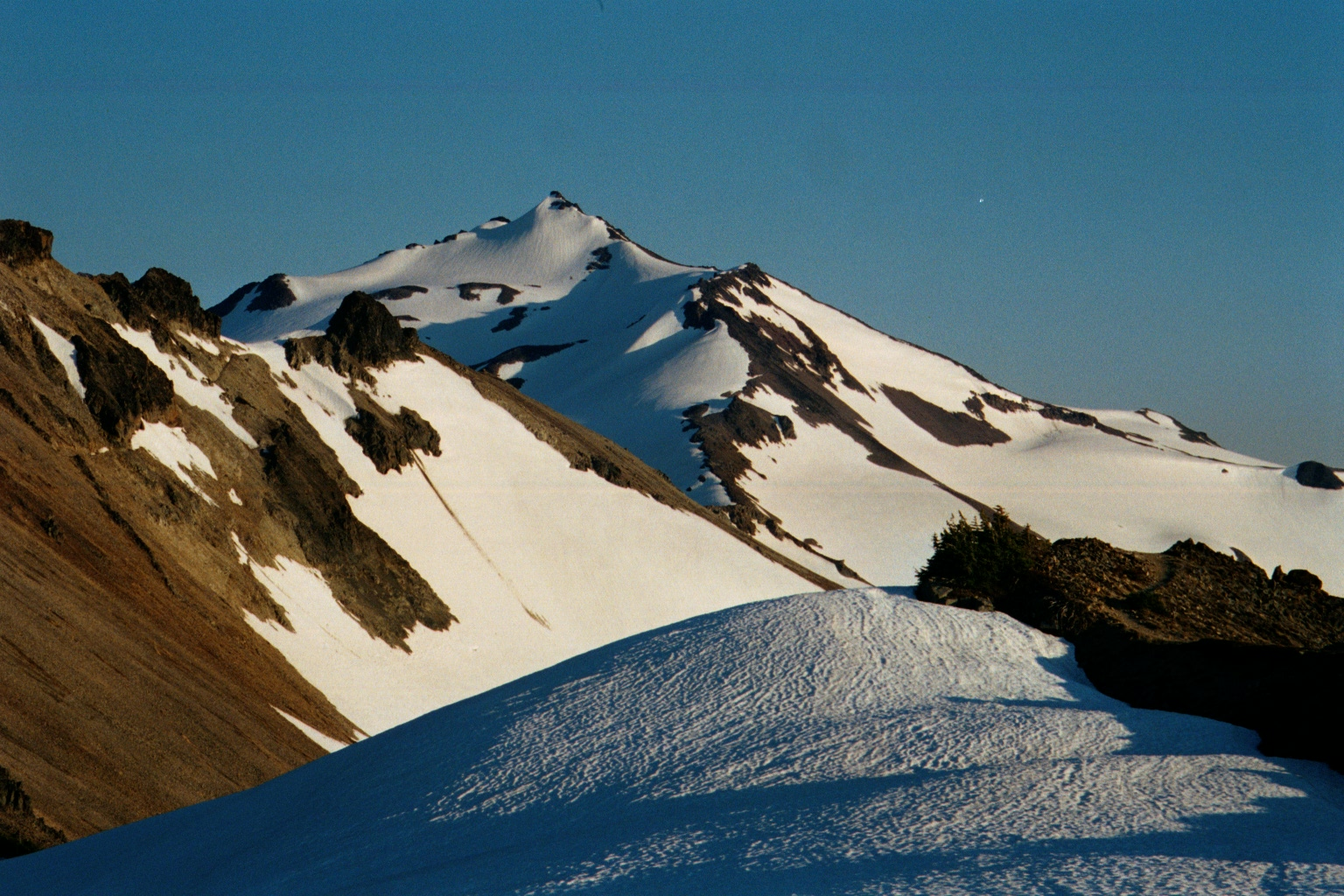
Old Snowy Mountain from the north, with the snow-covered McCall and Packwood Glaciers flanking the peak

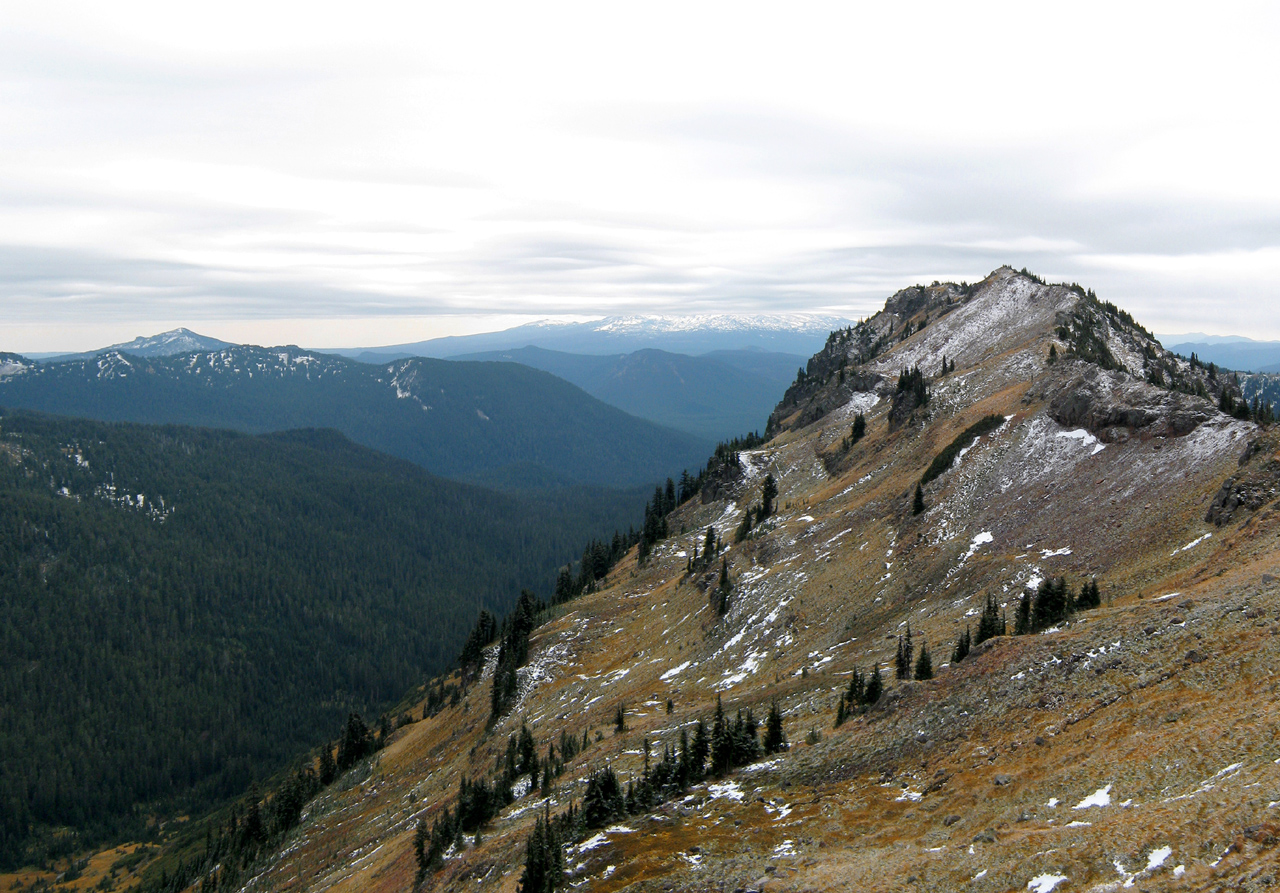
Goat Ridge; base of Mount Adams is visible

=== Glaciation ===
Although it may have once been a towering stratovolcano, Goat Rocks has undergone extensive erosion since its extinction. Once eruptions ceased, the ongoing forces of glacial erosion, as well as hydrothermal alteration of the volcano's interior, stripped away layers of volcanic ash deposits and lava flows, uncovering the rocky lava spines where magma had cooled and hardened within the conduits of the volcano. Nearly all the remaining volcanic debris has been partially covered by a younger layer of rock.

The Goat Rocks area is notable for its extensive glaciers, despite its modest elevation and southerly location relative to the rest of the Washington Cascades. Four major glaciers mantle the north and northeast slopes of the peaks: Conrad Glacier, McCall Glacier, Meade Glacier, and Packwood Glacier, along with numerous smaller permanent snowfields.

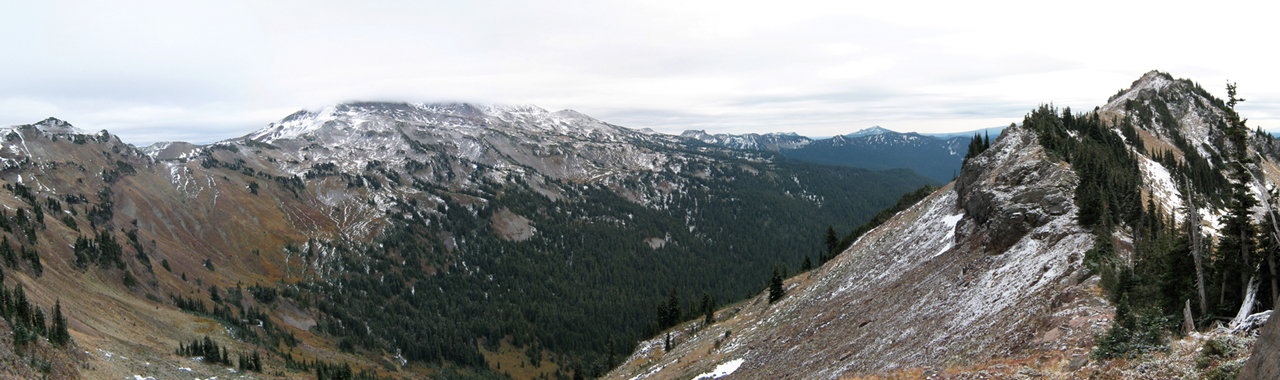
Goat Ridge panorama with Old Snowy Mountain on the left obscured by cloud cover.

=== Major peaks in the Goat Rocks vicinity ===
The elevation of the Goat Rocks volcano and its immediate vicinity varies from 914 to 2,500 m (2,999 to 8,202 ft) at its highest point, Gilbert Peak. Because of extensive glaciation and erosion, the peaks surrounding Goat Rocks are at most moderate in height.

Gilbert Peak (Mount Curtis Gilbert)	2,500 m (8,202 ft)
Old Snowy Mountain	2,402 m (7,881 ft)
Ives Peak	2,414 m (7,920 ft)
Tieton Peak	2,369 m (7,772 ft)
Johnson Peak	2,282 m (7,487 ft)
Bear Creek Mountain	2,238 m (7,343 ft)
Hogback Mountain	2,071 m (6,795 ft)

== Eruptive history ==
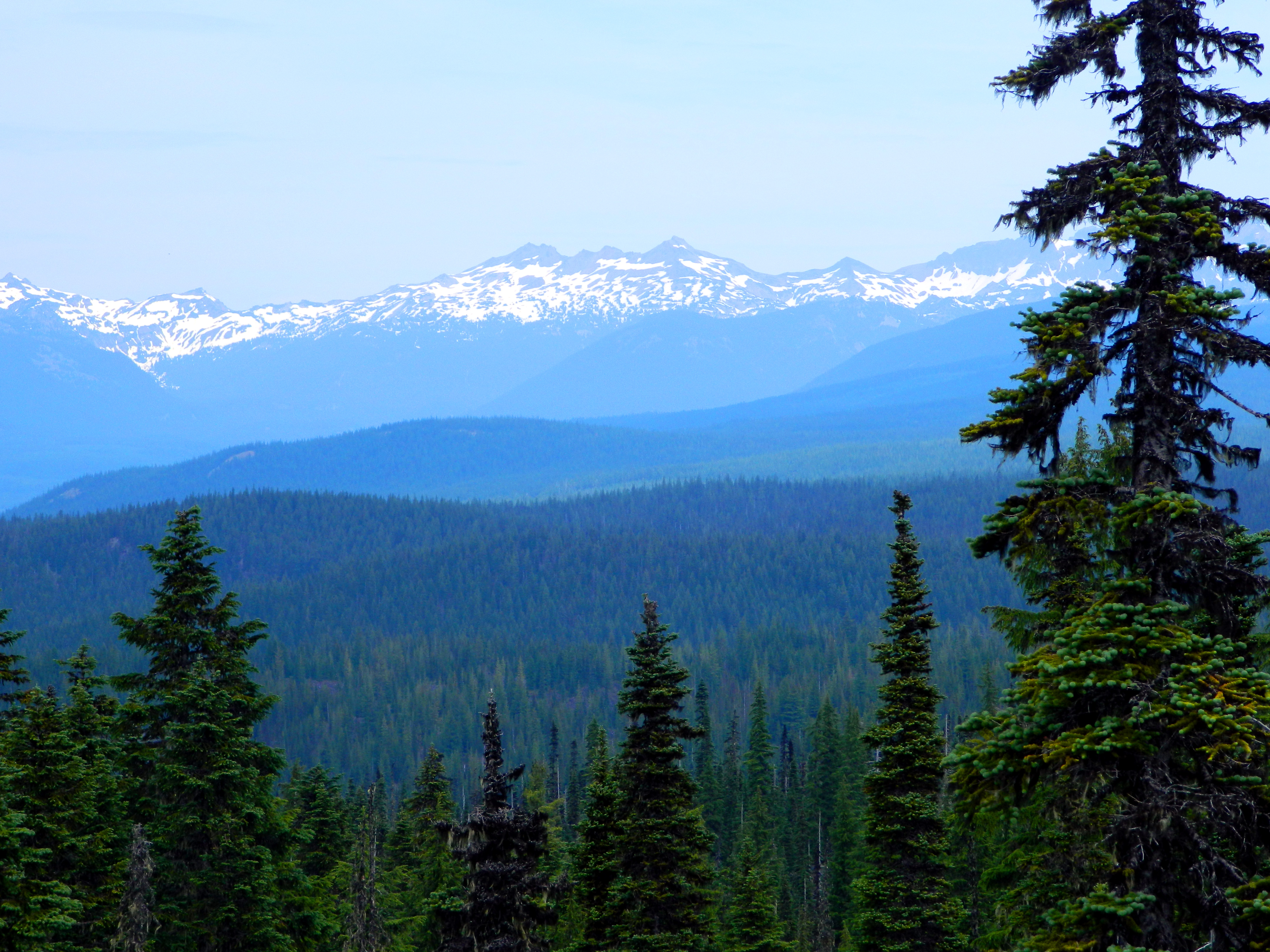
Goat Rocks volcano as seen from Mount Adams vicinity

Goat Rocks is a stratovolcano with a somewhat complicated eruptive history. It first became active approximately 3.2 million years ago during the Pliocene epoch, undergoing explosive eruptions that ejected silicic lava with highly felsic rocks like rhyolite. One of these events produced 650 m (2,133 ft) of tuff that remains, exposed, on the east flank of the existing mountain. This rhyolitic episode also produced the Devil's Horn caldera. The amount of rhyolite tuff exceeds 20 km^{3} (4.8 mi^{3}).

Three million years ago Goat Rocks shifted to mafic volcanism, erupting olivine and basalt. As eruptions continued into the Pleistocene epoch, the lava flows became increasingly andesitic, containing mostly pyroxene with phenocrysts as well as hornblende minerals. These andesitic flows formed the volcano's major edifice between roughly 2.5 and 0.5 million years ago, which may have resembled contemporary Mount Rainier. At this point in time, Goat Rocks's eruptions had very high volumes and extended far from the volcano, possibly because multiple satellite vents contributed to eruptions.

Approximately 1.64 million years ago, Goat Rocks generated an andesitic lava flow extending 80 km (50 mi) down the Naches and Tieton Rivers, which has been recognized as the longest andesite flow on Earth having a total volume of 6.6 km^{3} (1.6 mi^{3}). About 250,000 years after this andesite flow a second flow erupted from Bear Creek Mountain, the second flow took a similar path as the older one and had a total volume of 2.5 km^{3} (0.60 mi^{3}). Many of the flows immediately surrounding the volcano have since been cut by intrusive dikes, which form a radial arrangement around the volcano's core.

As erosion occurred on a large scale, the volcano remained active, producing more hornblende andesite lava flows. Eruptive activity continued at Old Snowy Mountain into the middle to late Pleistocene, yielding hornblende andesite lava flows that were subsequently glaciated in the Cispus River valley; whether Old Snowy Mountain is a vent of Goat Rocks or an independent volcano remains unclear. Hornblende andesite can also be found on top of the highest point in Goat Rocks, Gilbert Peak.

Hogback Mountain, a shield volcano north of Goat Rocks and south of White Pass, was identified by Siebert et al. (2010) as a satellite vent of Goat Rocks. Rising 700 m (2,297 ft) in elevation, it erupted more than 200 m (656 ft) of olivine basalt and basaltic andesite from the end of the Pliocene through the early Pleistocene. Eruptions from Goat Rocks formed a spread-out volcanic field populated by small lava domes and cinder cones as far north as an unnamed vent on American Ridge north of Bumping Lake. Spiral Butte along US 12 near White Pass is one of these vents, having erupted less than 690,000 years ago. The volcanic field's dimensions are approximately 29.9 by 15 km (19 by 9 mi).

Goat Rocks is now classified as an extinct volcano, as its most recent eruptive activity was during the Pleistocene. The last eruption from the Goat Rocks complex occurred around 115,000 years ago. It was an effusive lava flow known as the Clear Fork Lava. The flow was primarily composed of dacite and flowed 12 km (7.5 mi) along the White Pass Highway and has an estimated volume of 0.55 km^{3} (0.13 mi^{3}).

== Wilderness ==
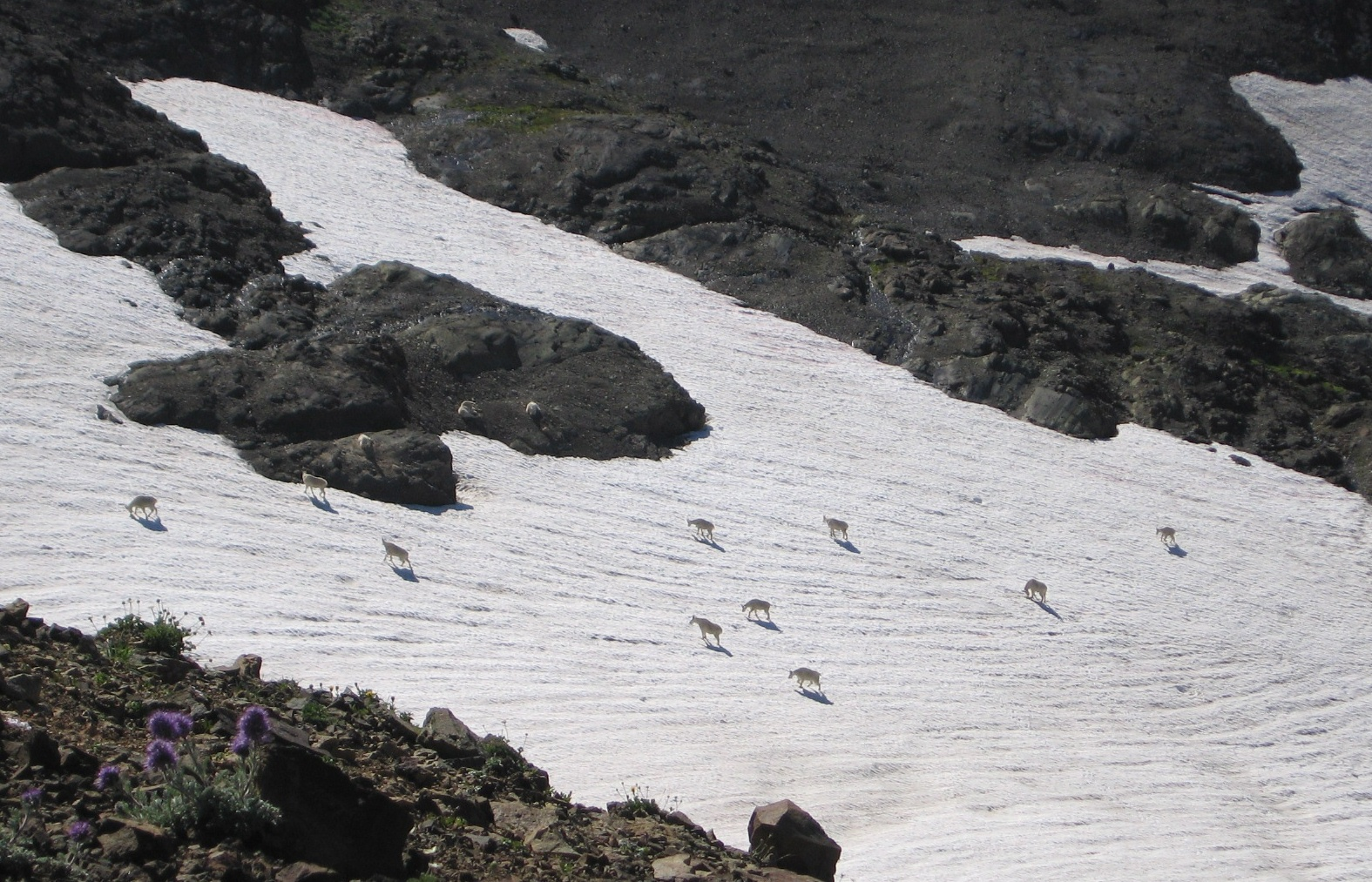
A herd of goats, as seen from the Pacific Crest Trail

Land surrounding Goat Rocks was first protected by the United States Department of Agriculture in February 1931, when approximately 18,009 hectares (44,501 acres) was set aside for preservation. In 1935, this was increased to 29,315 hectares (72,439 acres) of land, then to 33,459 hectares (82,679 acres) in 1940. In 1964, the United States Congress created the Goats Rock Wilderness as part of the National Wilderness Preservation System, delegating its management to the United States Forest Service. Since additional land was incorporated in 1984, it now encompasses 43,745 hectares (108,096 acres) between Mount Rainier and Mount Adams, straddling the Gifford Pinchot and Okanogan-Wenatchee national forests. It is bordered by the Yakama Indian Reservation to the southeast.

The wilderness ranges from 914 to 2,500 m (2,999 to 8,202 ft) in elevation, featuring alpine tundras with glaciers, small lakes, and ponds, as well as 15 different routes that amount to 193 km (120 mi) of trails. One of these trails constitutes the highest segment of the famous Pacific Crest Trail in Washington, running for 50 km (31 mi) north–south through the middle of the wilderness area. Because this route is located at such a high elevation, its hikers may experience violent storms that could be dangerous for unprepared parties. Much of the wilderness is located above the timberline, offering views of alpine scenery.

=== Climate and wildlife ===
Weather within the Wilderness varies due to the mountains acting as a barrier for both weather and temperature. The Cascade Range mountains prevent wet storms from moving, forcing air to rise and then cool. This cooling air cannot hold as much moisture, causing heavy precipitation (up to 381 cm (150 in) in rainfall annually) on the western flanks of the mountains, which leads to extensive forestation. Snowfall typically totals more than 8 m (26 ft) annually, amounting to snow still being present as late as July or August. In warmer months, melted snow runs off into lakes, keeping them especially full. Because the mountains are so tall, storm clouds may get stuck even as the rest of the storm moves onward, leading to snowstorms and freezing temperatures year-round. In extreme conditions, these storm cells might endanger hikers by means of strong winds, fog, snow, and rain that can potentially make hiking nearly impossible. On the eastern sides of the mountains, air warms as it drops, producing Chinook winds, considerably lower precipitation, and less forested landscapes. Because of these conditions, temperatures on the western sides of mountains are steady, whereas temperatures on the eastern flanks fluctuate wildly.

Goat Rocks obtained its name from a population of mountain goats that can be observed around the mountain. Other fauna include marmots and pikas at high elevations. Deer and elk can be found below the timberline, including mule deer, mule deer-black-tailed hybrids, Roosevelt elk, and Rocky Mountain elk that were introduced from Yellowstone National Park in 1913. Black-tailed deer are especially common.

=== Climbing and recreation ===
Old Snowy Mountain and Gilbert Peak, two of Goat Rocks's peaks, are frequented by hikers and mountaineers. Both are considered remote summits, although Old Snowy Mountain is the more accessible of the two. This, coupled with its easier ascent, makes Old Snowy Mountain the more popular climb. There are several routes up the mountain, which take 5–6 hours, rising 1,097 m (3,599 ft) in elevation. Running for 23 km (14 mi) round-trip, Old Snowy can be scrambled or climbed using glaciers, although a trail exists. From the summit, mountaineers can see Mount St. Helens and Mount Rainier in the distance. Because this area has a lot of loose talus and rock, an avalanche hazard exists.

The climb up Gilbert Peak was first completed by Fred G. Plummer in 1899. It also rises 1,097 m (3,599 ft) in elevation, lasting 6–8 hours and running for 26 km (16 mi) round-trip. Because the routes are longer and more technically challenging due to loose rock, scrambling Gilbert is generally considered more difficult than Old Snowy Mountain. Most climbers opt to mount Gilbert early in the climbing season when snow levels are low.

Recreational activities permitted by the Forest Service at the Wilderness include day hiking, horse riding, and backpacking. Because Goat Rocks is part of the National Wilderness Preservation System, motor vehicles and means of transport are prohibited. These include bicycles, wagons, motorboats, and helicopters. A free permit is required for entry to the wilderness.

=== Resources ===
Mineral resources in the Goat Rocks area can be divided into three segments, each rich with certain minerals. The first two are named Packwood Glacier–McCall Basin and Glacier Basin, and are located near past volcanic vents. These areas exhibit anomalous levels of cobalt, copper, lead, molybdenum, nickel, and zinc, well-dispersed levels of pyrite, and sporadic concentrations of silver. Area C corresponds to the Clear Fork of the Cowlitz River and lies along the area of contact between Goat Rocks volcano and older volcanoes to the east. It is distinct from the other two study areas, featuring anomalous amounts of barium, cobalt, copper, and manganese, as well as smaller quantities of lead, molybdenum, nickel, and zinc. Other minerals found in Area C include barite, boron, cinnabar, mercury, pyrite, and tin in concentrates taken from stream-sediment. The water has high concentrations of chlorine, copper, fluorine, and molybdenum, and altered rocks contain arsenic, lead, manganese, molybdenum, and zinc at especially high levels. The Goat Rocks vicinity seems to offer large base metal deposits. Outside the area studied, coal has been identified at the Packwood and Cowlitz fields, and building stones and gravel are being quarried to the north and west of the volcano. The Goat Rocks area's potential resources for oil and gas remain unidentified. Because no volcanic activity has occurred during the Holocene (within the past 11,700 years), Goat Rocks has very little potential for geothermal resources.

Claims to three lode mines and a single coal mine were made within the Goat Rocks Wilderness, but the United States Bureau of Mines has no record of production from any of these claims. Historically, two claims have actually been staked in the area, the Mosquito lode near Walupt Lake in 1934, and later, the Glacier lode near Packwood Glacier in 1939. Neither show evidence of assessment work, and both deposits are now abandoned. Miners may have been drawn to the area by news of lode deposits containing gold, silver, and copper along breccia and shear zones to the north of the wilderness area.

== See also ==
- List of geographic features in Lewis County, Washington
