= Lake County Museum of Art =

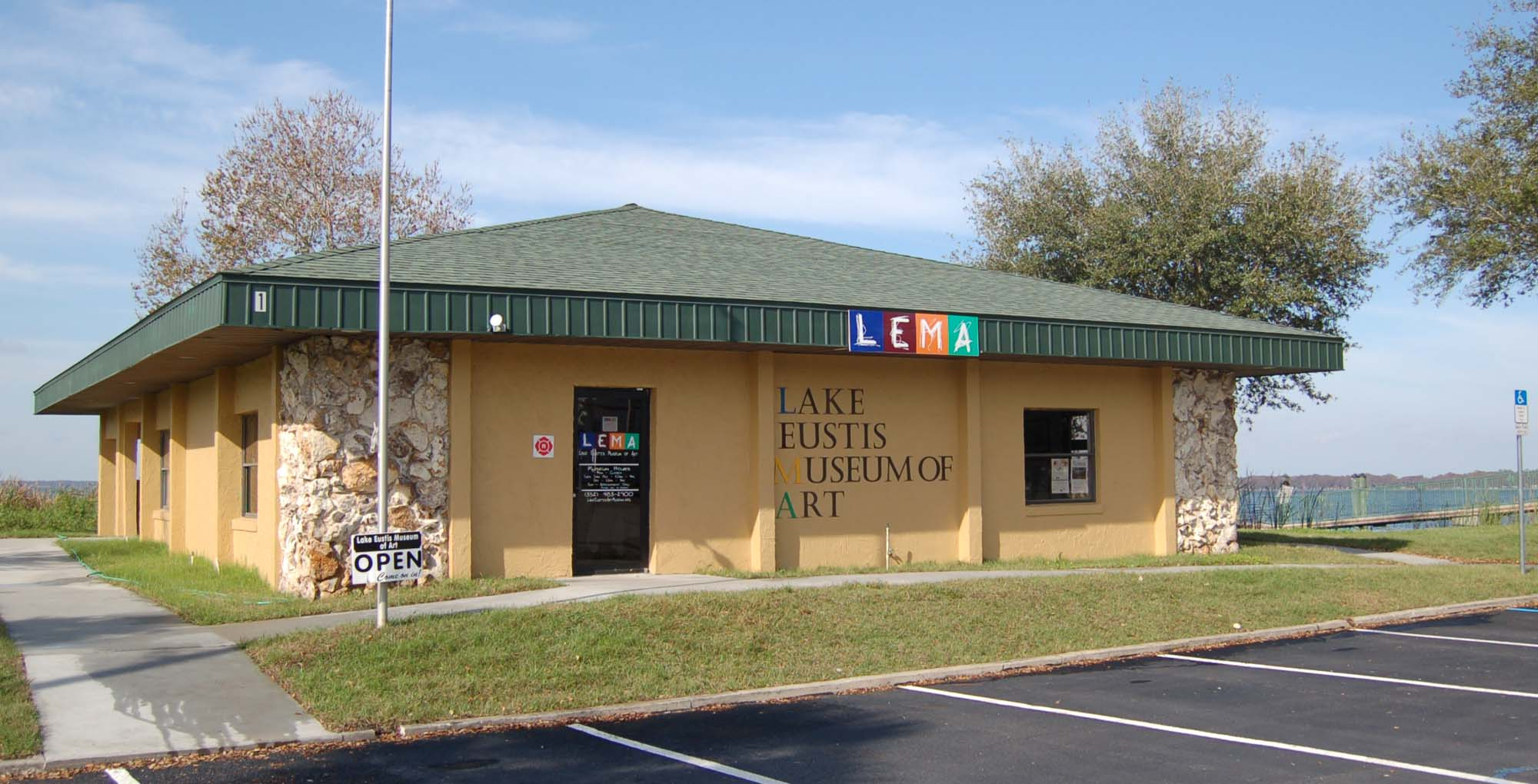

- Location within Florida
- Established: 1995
- Location: 213 W Ruby Street Avenue; Tavares, Florida
- Coordinates: 28.8011°N 81.7301°W
- Type: Art museum
- Website: lakeartmuseum.com

Opened in 1995, the Lake County Museum of Art (LCMA) exhibits historic, contemporary artwork from local, regional, and national sources. LCMA is the first art museum in Lake County dedicated wholly to visual art.

== History ==
In 1995 66 artists and patrons of the arts established Lake Eustis Center of the Arts in an 1881 store front on Bay Street in the heart of historic downtown Eustis, to nurture culture and beauty. The founders decided to rename the institution the Lake Eustis Museum of Art, pledged to exhibit and collect fine art. Soon the art museum offered exhibitions, art events, children's art programs, adult field trips and an annual outdoor art festival (since discontinued). Membership grew along with volunteers. In 2004, the need for more space brought relocation to a building across the street from Eustis City Hall.

In 2009, LEMA began a $5 entry donation to visit the gallery for non-members. The museum became a member of the AAM and the North American Reciprocal Museum Program. 2009 and 2010 saw dramatic development in the permanent collection.

LEMA was nominated for a 2009 United Arts of Central Florida Arts+ Award for Community Engagement. Among the most significant, groundbreaking exhibits was an exhibit of works by high functioning autistic youngsters for United Arts of Central Florida's ArtsFest 2009/10. A Docent Project with guided tours was also added.

A national competition and exhibition in paper artworks was initiated in 2009. Create & Critique, adult water-medium painters continue long-standing weekly sessions at the art museum under direction of Mary Ziegengeist, who was recognized for her continued dedication and commitment to the community with the Lake County Community Service Arts and Culture Award 2010. Also, LEMA established the Bonnie Gillespie Reference Library, with a collection of art reference books. Additionally, the FRIENDS Literary Guild selects, reads and then reviews art-related fiction and non-fiction books during a monthly meeting.

The museum extended art educational opportunities to the home schooled, and a 10-week adult sketch study class. In 2009, LEMA forged a new partnership with the Central Florida Water Color Society to mount about four, two-month, fine art exhibits annually at City Hall, under the art museum's umbrella.

In November 2012, LEMA moved to a new location on Lake Eustis in Ferran Park.

Since that time, exhibitions have included an extremely popular members exhibition, an exhibition of the work of Brenda Heim and Doug Hays, HE SHE WE, and in the fall of 2013, a retrospective exhibition of Catherine Haynes Stockwell, Painting Eustis. Membership has continued to increase, and adult art classes have been in swing since 2012. The 2013 Wine-A-Fare, the museum's premier fundraiser, was followed by an equally successful version in 2014, as well as new events including a holiday tree auction and a 1950s dance.

In 2014 LEMA built a presence at the First Friday events in downtown Eustis.

A 4 July 2014 event was held in Ferran Park, part of a growing alliance between the Chamber of Commerce and LEMA.

In April 2019 LEMA was forced to leave its previous home in Ferran Park. The museum formed a partnership with the Herbert Lehner Foundation and renamed itself the Lake County Museum of Art, now located in Tavares. LCMA reopened in its location in June 2019 with an exhibit by artist Liz Wincup.
