= Old Snowy Mountain =

Mountain in Washington (state), United States

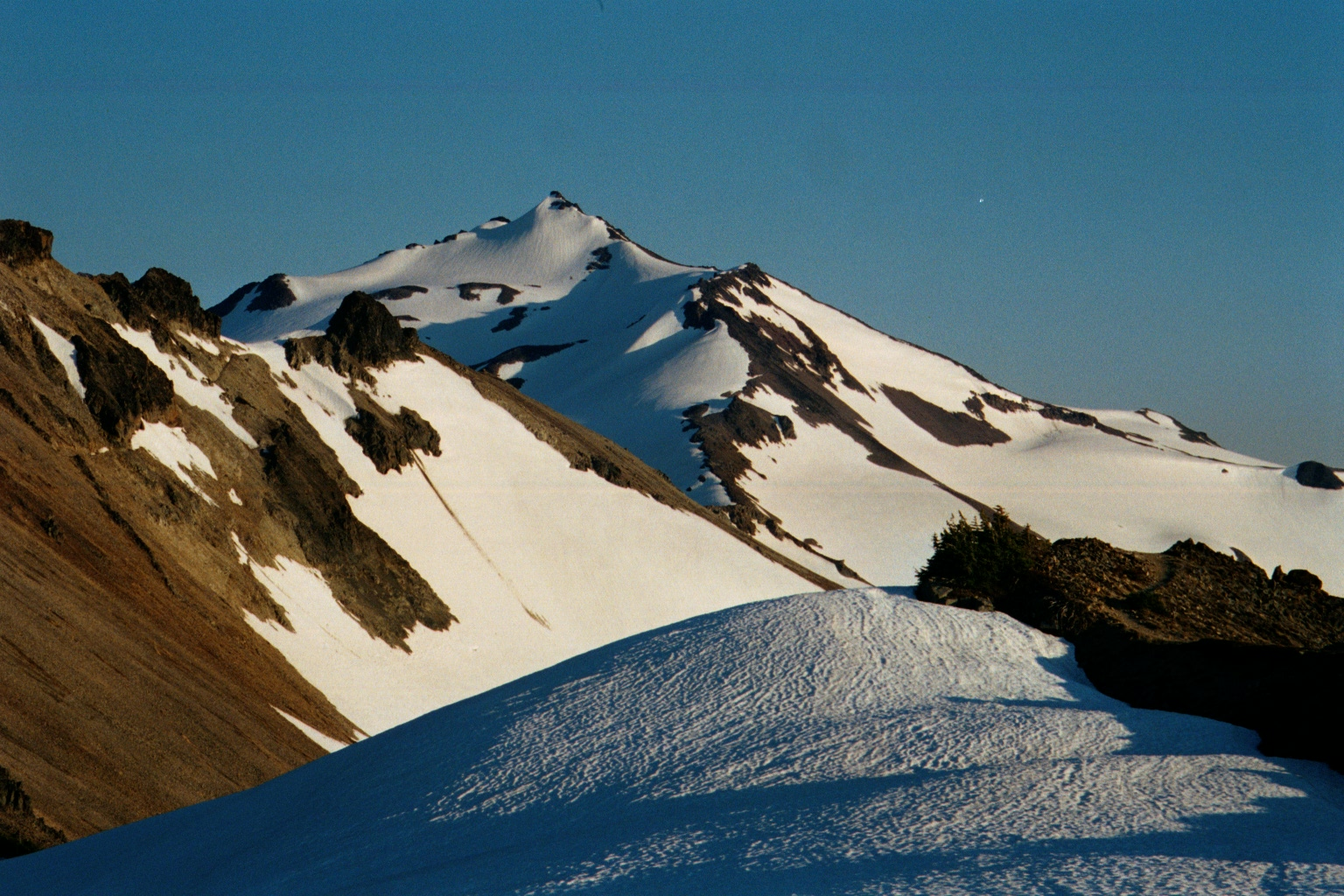
- Old Snowy Mountain

Highest point
- Elevation: 7,880+ ft (2,400+ m)
- Prominence: 280 ft (90 m)
- Coordinates: 46°30′43″N 121°27′14″W

Geography
- Location within Washington (state) Location within the United States
- Location: Goat Rocks, Washington, U.S.
- Parent range: Cascade Range
- Topo map: USGS Old Snowy Mountain

Geology
- Mountain type: Stratovolcano

Climbing
- Easiest route: Scramble

Old Snowy Mountain (7,880+ ft (2,400+ m)) is located in the Goat Rocks on the border of Lewis and Yakima Counties, in the U.S. state of Washington. Old Snowy Mountain is within the Goat Rocks Wilderness in Gifford Pinchot National Forest and is flanked by the McCall Glacier on its eastern slopes while the smaller Packwood Glacier is just northwest of the peak. Additionally, the Pacific Crest National Scenic Trail is on the west slopes of the peak.

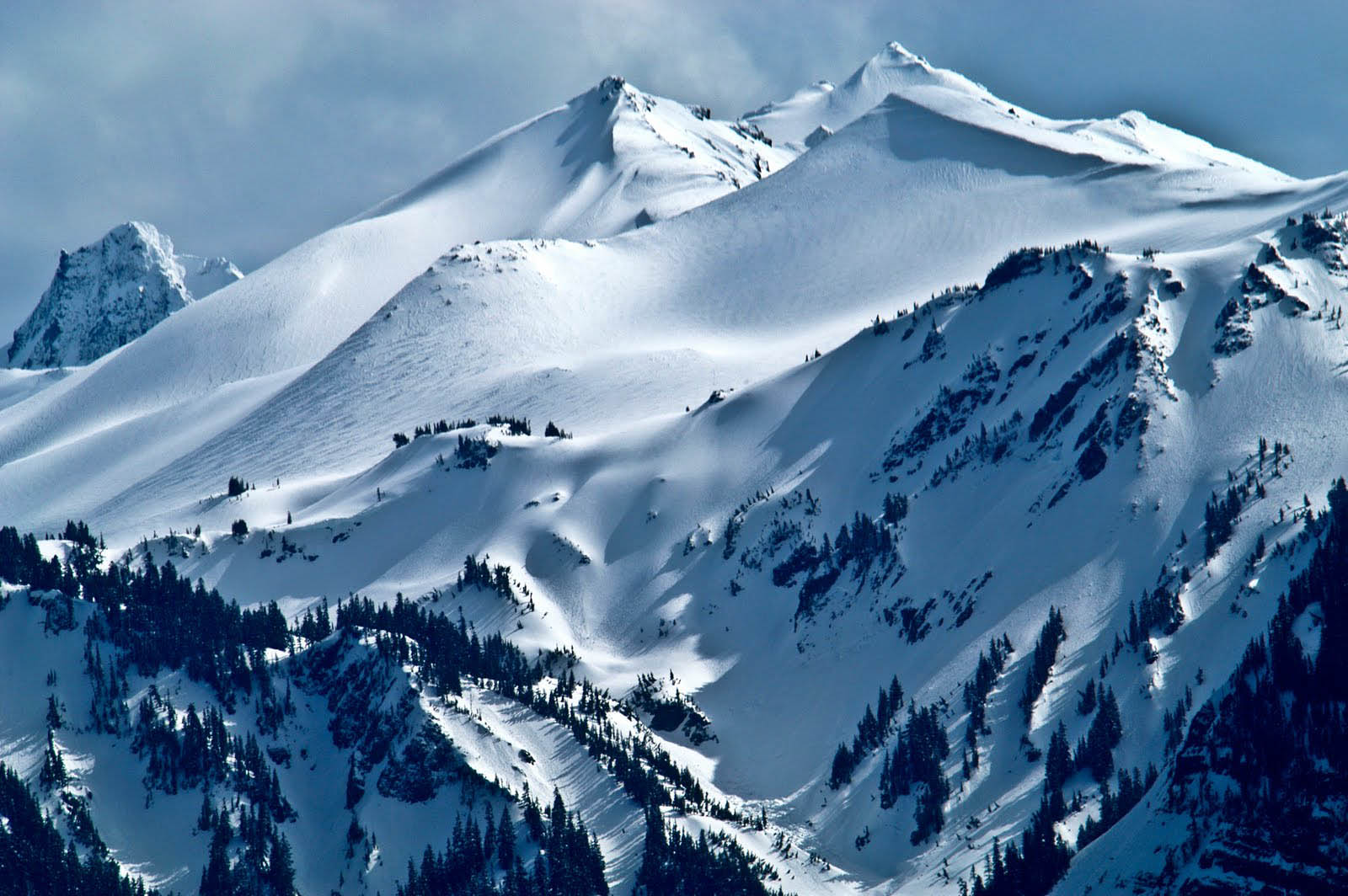
North aspect (Ives Peak in back, left edge)

== See also ==
- List of geographic features in Lewis County, Washington
