= Conrad Glacier =

Glacier in the state of Washington

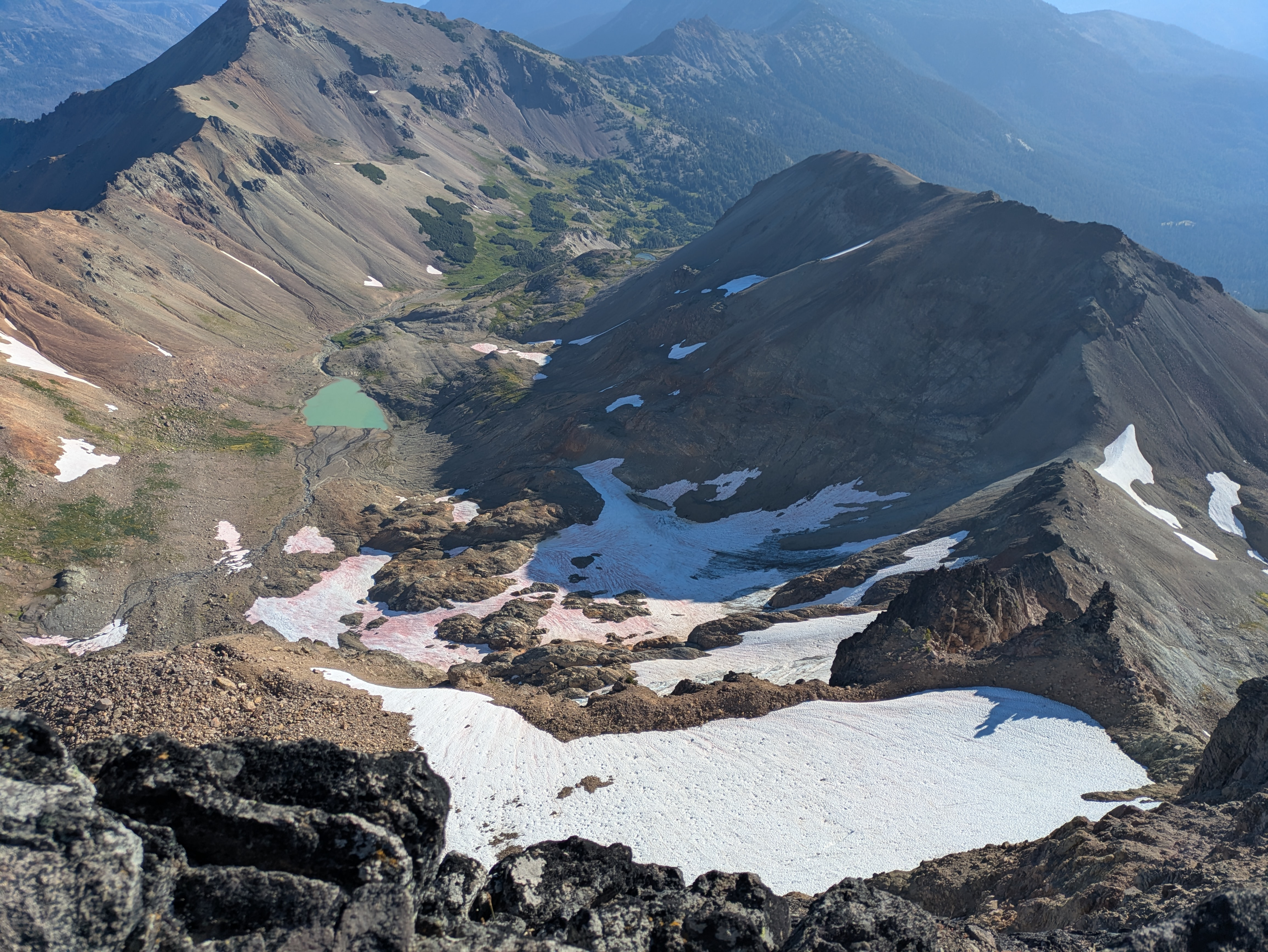
- The much-reduced former glacier from Gilbert Peak

- Location within Washington (state)
- Type: Mountain glacier
- Location: Gilbert Peak, Yakima County, Washington, USA
- Coordinates: 46°29′37″N 121°24′23″W
- Length: .25 mi (0.40 km)
- Terminus: Barren rocks
- Status: Retreating

Conrad Glacier is located in the Goat Rocks region of the U.S. state of Washington. Situated on the north side of 8,184-foot (2,494 m) Gilbert Peak, the glacier flows north-northeast from an elevation of 7,500 ft (2,300 m) to barren rocks and talus. A proglacial lake at 6,416 ft (1,956 m), lies where the glacier once terminated. Between 1970 and 2004, Conrad Glacier lost more than 29 ft (8.8 m) in thickness in some places and split into several separate bodies of ice.

== See also ==
- List of glaciers in the United States
