= Gilbert Peak (Washington) =

Extinct volcano in Washington (state), United States

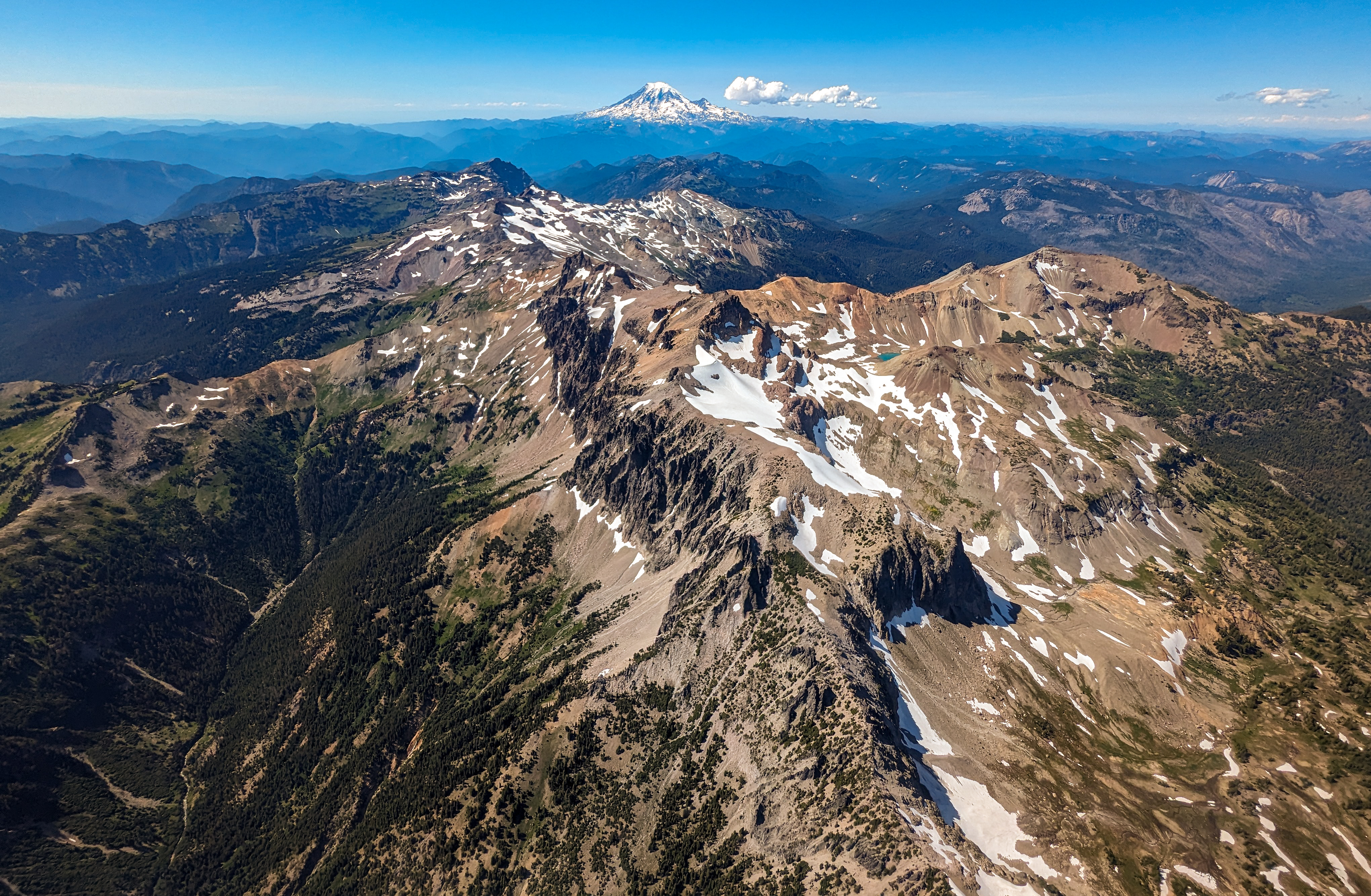
- Gilbert Peak (triangular peak in the center)

Highest point
- Elevation: 8,184 ft (2,494 m)
- Prominence: 3,664 ft (1,117 m)
- Coordinates: 46°29′18″N 121°24′25″W

Geography
- Location within Washington (state) Location within the United States
- Location: Goat Rocks, Washington, U.S.
- Parent range: Cascade Range
- Topo map: USGS Walupt Lake

Geology
- Mountain type: Stratovolcano

Climbing
- Easiest route: Scramble

Gilbert Peak (8,184 feet (2,494 m) is located in the Goat Rocks on the border of the Yakama Indian Reservation and Yakima County, in the U.S. state of Washington. Situated partly in the Goat Rocks Wilderness, Gilbert Peak is the highest summit in the Goat Rocks, which are the eroded remnants of an extinct stratovolcano. Meade Glacier is located on the southeastern slopes of the peak, while Conrad Glacier is on the north slope.

== Climate ==
Climate data for Gilbert Peak 46.4905 N, 121.4159 W, Elevation: 7,421 ft (2,262 m) (1991–2020 normals)
Month	Jan	Feb	Mar	Apr	May	Jun	Jul	Aug	Sep	Oct	Nov	Dec	Year
Mean daily maximum °F (°C)	28.4 (−2.0)	28.7 (−1.8)	30.8 (−0.7)	36.0 (2.2)	44.2 (6.8)	49.8 (9.9)	59.9 (15.5)	60.5 (15.8)	54.1 (12.3)	42.2 (5.7)	31.9 (−0.1)	27.0 (−2.8)	41.1 (5.1)
Daily mean °F (°C)	23.0 (−5.0)	22.1 (−5.5)	23.2 (−4.9)	27.1 (−2.7)	34.5 (1.4)	39.8 (4.3)	48.6 (9.2)	49.3 (9.6)	44.0 (6.7)	34.4 (1.3)	26.3 (−3.2)	21.9 (−5.6)	32.8 (0.5)
Mean daily minimum °F (°C)	17.7 (−7.9)	15.6 (−9.1)	15.6 (−9.1)	18.2 (−7.7)	24.8 (−4.0)	29.8 (−1.2)	37.2 (2.9)	38.0 (3.3)	33.9 (1.1)	26.6 (−3.0)	20.7 (−6.3)	16.8 (−8.4)	24.6 (−4.1)
Average precipitation inches (mm)	17.46 (443)	12.79 (325)	11.87 (301)	7.93 (201)	5.22 (133)	3.53 (90)	1.10 (28)	1.13 (29)	3.16 (80)	8.60 (218)	13.66 (347)	14.56 (370)	101.01 (2,565)
Source: PRISM Climate Group

== Gallery ==
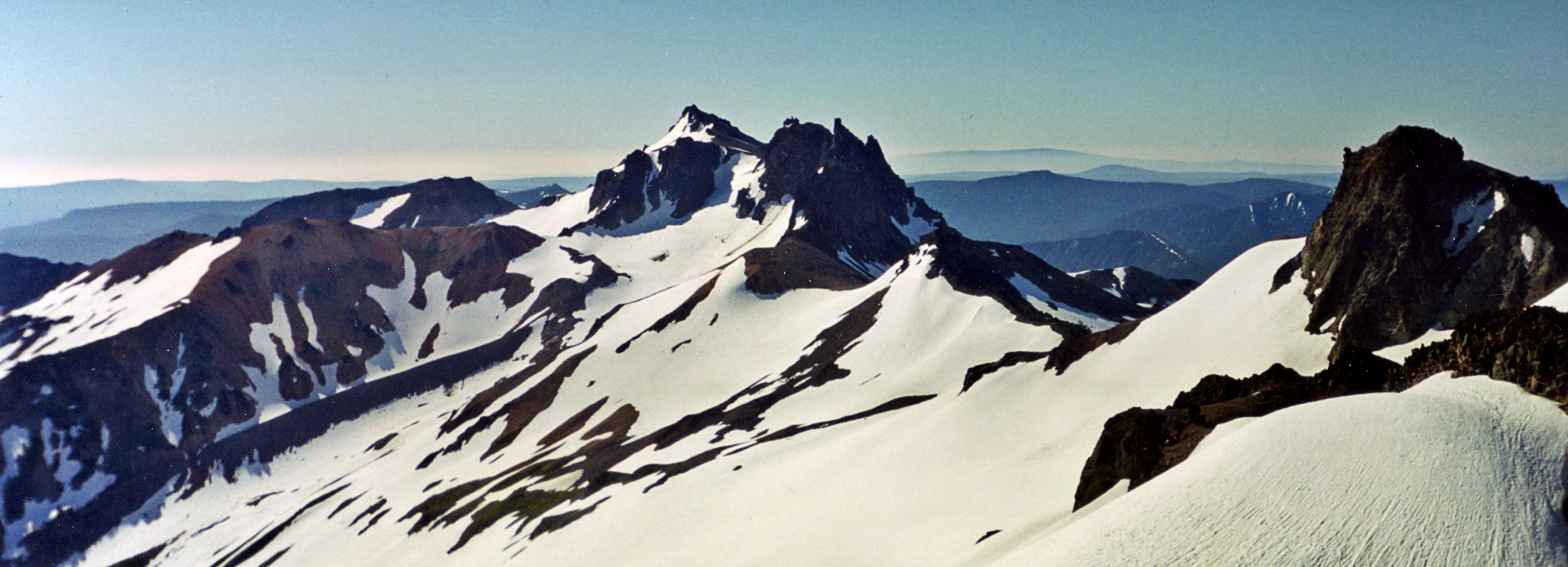
Gilbert Peak seen from Old Snowy

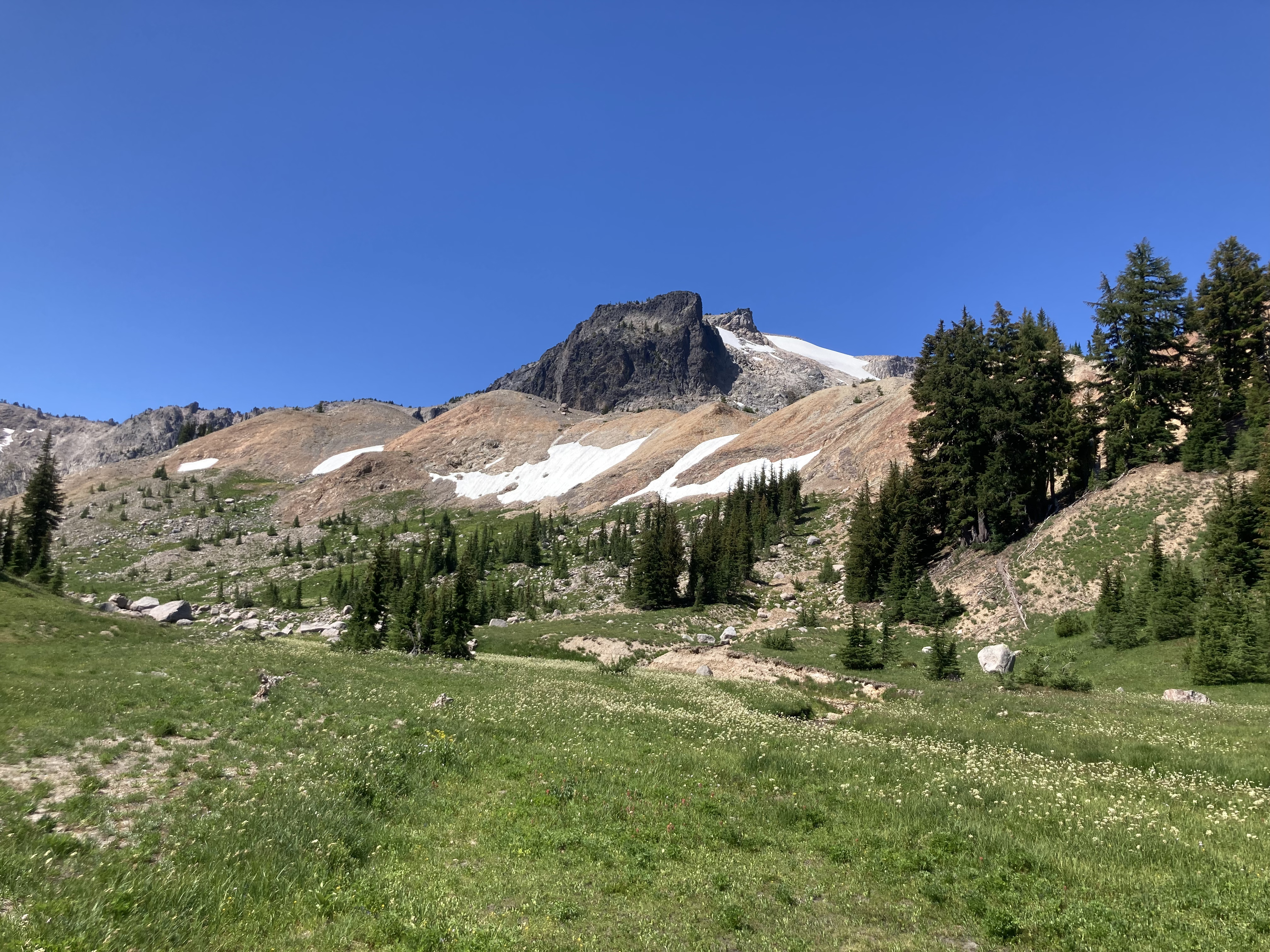
Seen from Goat Rocks Wilderness
