= Goat Rocks Wilderness =

Protected area

- IUCN category Ib (wilderness area)
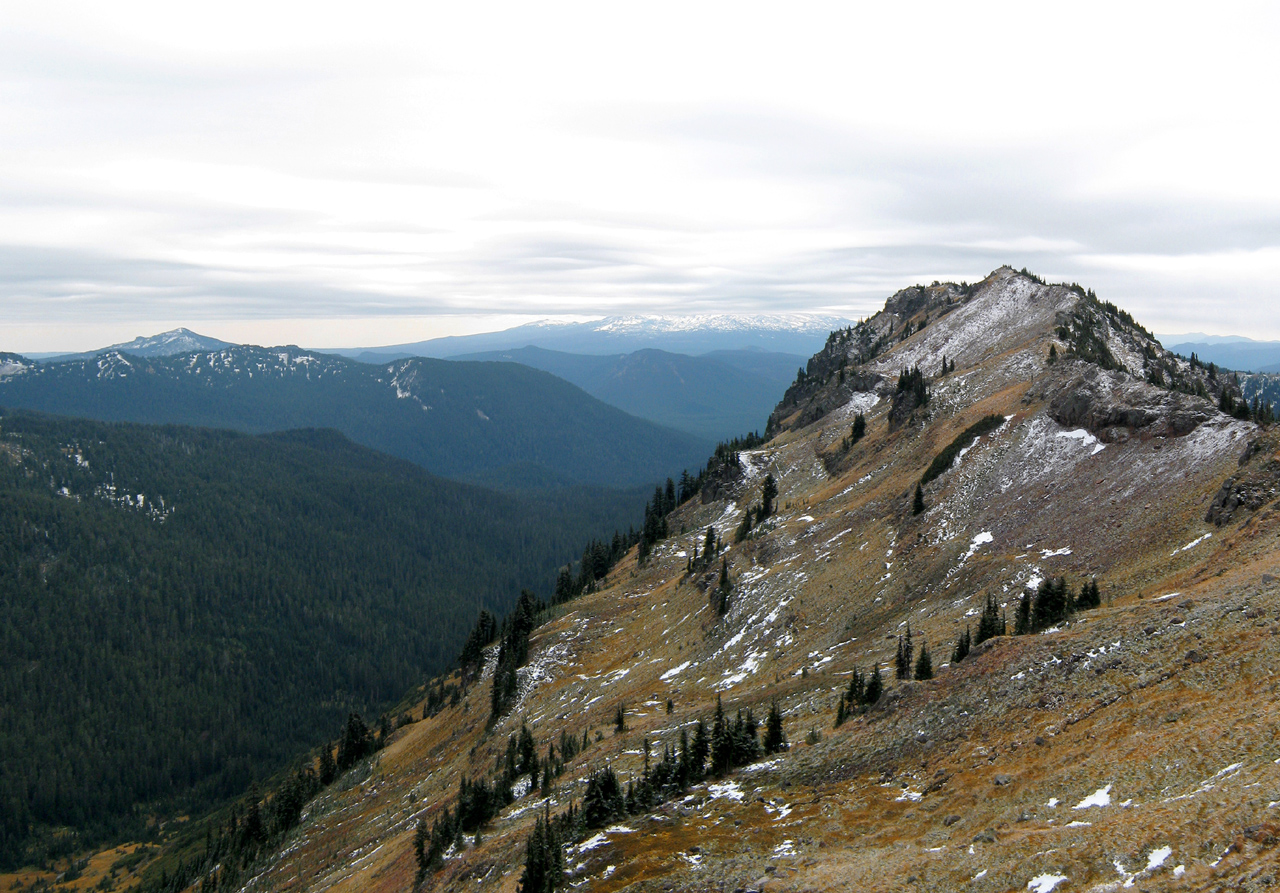

- Location within Washington (state) Location within the United States
- Location: Lewis / Yakima counties, Washington, USA
- Nearest city: Yakima, WA
- Coordinates: 46°30′44″N 121°27′14″W
- Area: 108,096 acres (437.45 km^{2})
- Established: September 3, 1964; 61 years ago
- Governing body: U.S. Forest Service
- Website: Goat Rocks Wilderness

Goat Rocks Wilderness is a U.S. wilderness area in Washington, United States, comprising 108,096 acres (43,745 ha) of Okanagan–Wenatchee National Forest and Gifford Pinchot National Forest on the crest of the Cascade Range south of U.S. Highway 12. Its central feature is a number of rugged peaks, the Goat Rocks, that are named after the numerous mountain goats that live in the area.

Extinct for some two million years, a volcano with an elevation of 12,000 feet (3,700 m) once dominated this landscape. The eroded remnant of this volcano consists of rugged peaks that average over 7,000 feet (2,100 m) elevation. The highest point among them is Gilbert Peak, at 8,184 feet (2,494 m) with a prominence of 3,664 feet (1,117 m). On the shaded northern slopes of the major peaks are the Packwood, McCall, Conrad, and Meade glaciers. The wilderness is drained by the North and South Forks of the Tieton, Cispus, and Cowlitz rivers and their tributaries. The lowest point in the wilderness is near Packwood Lake at 2,920 feet (890 m).

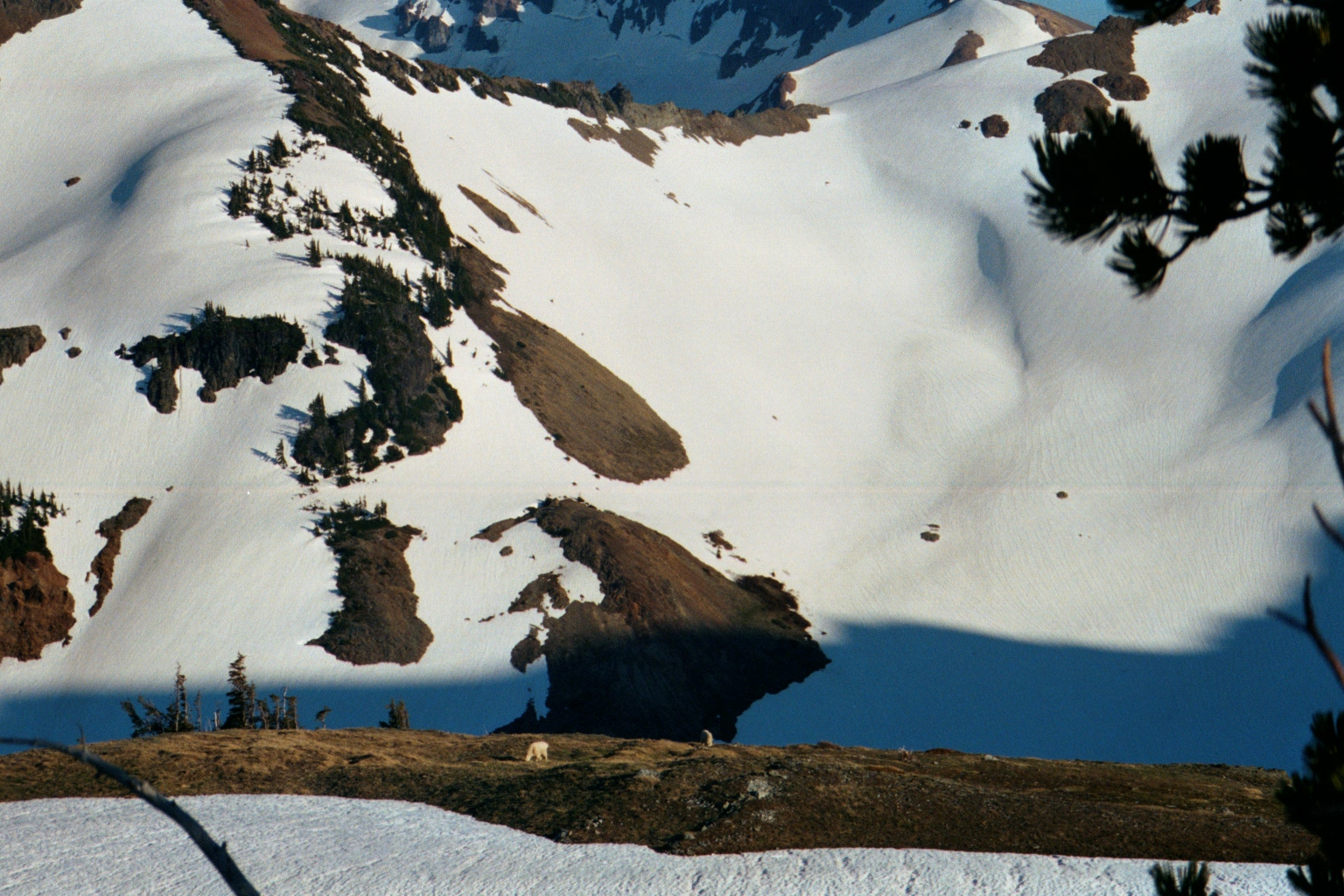
Mountain goats above the North Fork of the Tieton River

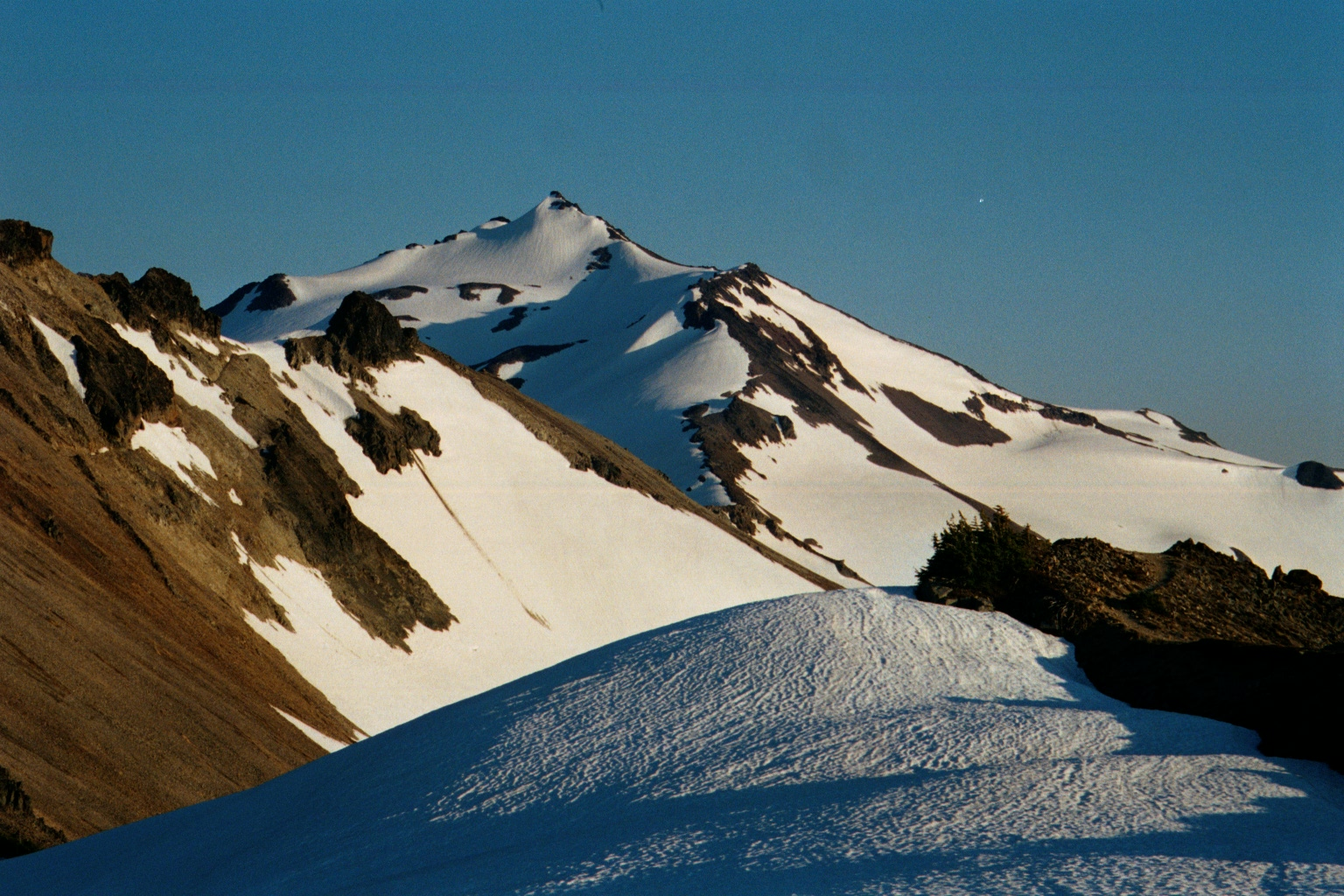
Old Snowy Mountain

== History ==
The wilderness values of this area were first recognized on February 13, 1931, when approximately 44,500 acres (180 km^{2}) were dedicated by the U.S. Department of Agriculture, Forest Service, as the Goat Rocks Primitive Area. In 1935, this was expanded to 72,440 acres (293 km^{2}). In 1940, the area was increased to 82,680 acres (335 km^{2}) and designated the Goat Rocks Wild Area by the Chief of the Forest Service. When Congress passed the Wilderness Act on September 3, 1964, this wild area became a wilderness, part of the National Wilderness Preservation System. Congress added additional area in 1984. Forest Service management is designated to preserve and enhance the wild character of the Wilderness while providing for public use and enjoyment.

== Recreation ==
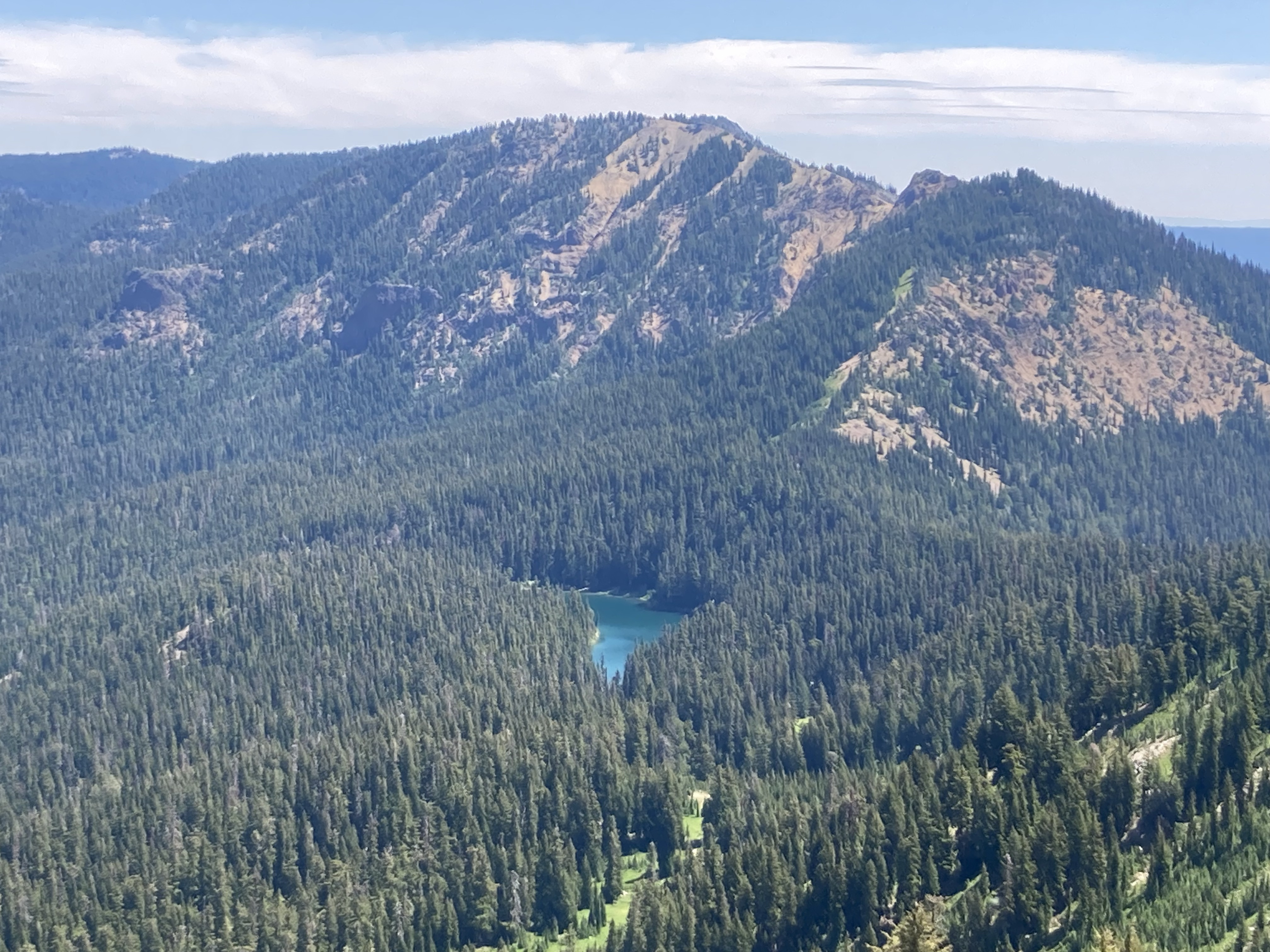
Surprise Lake

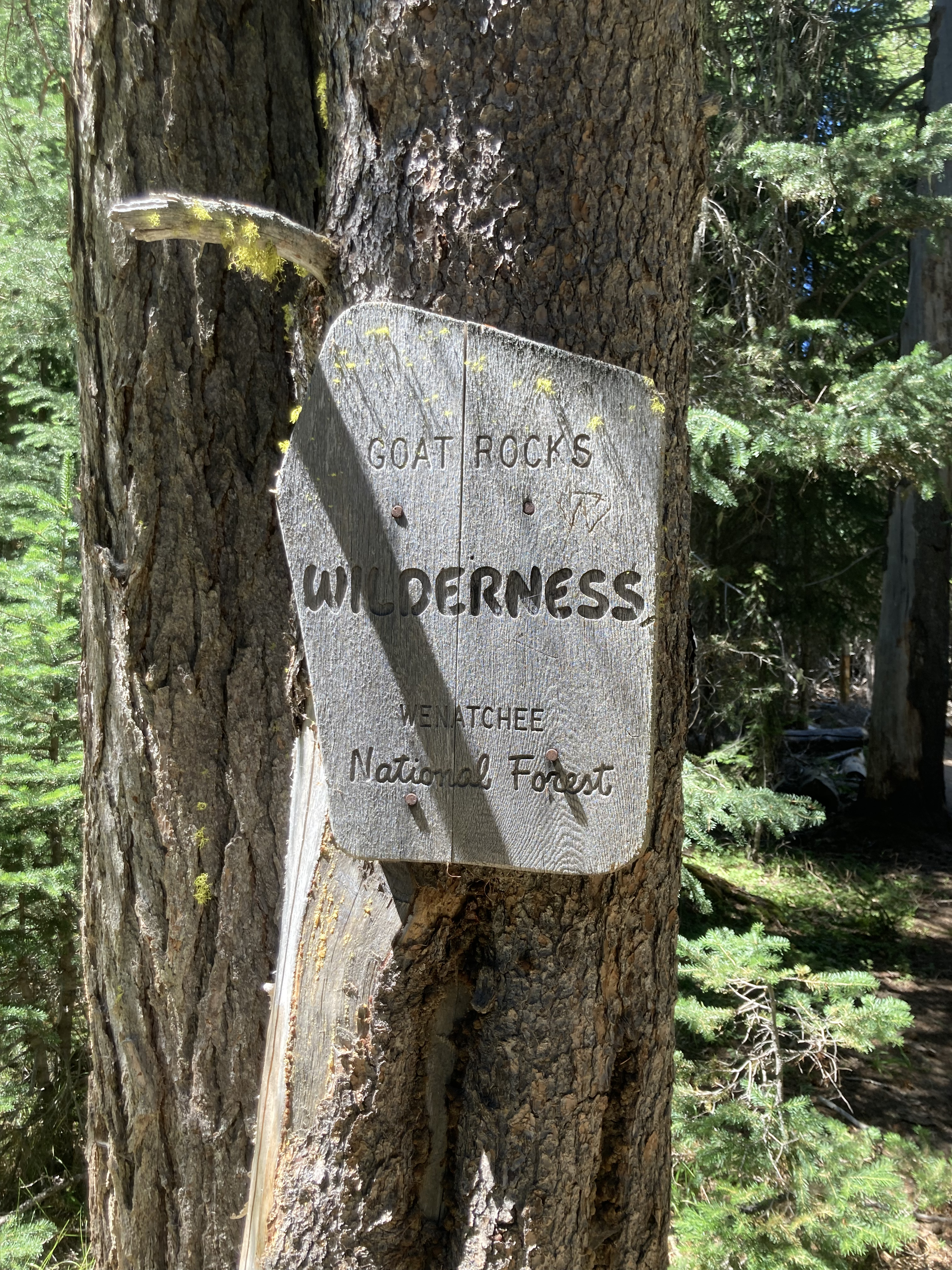
A sign marking the edge of the Goat Rocks

The Pacific Crest Trail (PCT), stretching from Canada to Mexico, passes through the Goat Rocks. The Washington State portion of this trail, formerly known as the Washington Cascade Crest Trail, was completed in 1935. In 1968, it was designated as part of the PCT by the National Trail System Act. The Yakama Indian Reservation, bordering the Goat rocks Wilderness on the southeast side, is closed to the general public except for the Pacific Crest Trail route.
