= Pinnacle Peak =

Pinnacle Peak may refer to:

== Mountains ==
=== United States ===
- Pinnacle Peak (Arizona), in Scottsdale
- Pinnacle Peak (Montana), a mountain in Powell County
- Pinnacle Peak (King County, Washington), in the Cascade Range
- Pinnacle Peak (Lewis County, Washington), in Mount Rainier National Park
- Pinnacle Peak (Whatcom County, Washington), in North Cascades National Park

=== Other countries ===
- Pinnacle Peak (Yukon), in the Saint Elias Mountains, Canada
- Pinnacle Peak (Ladakh), in Jammu and Kashmir, India

== Other uses ==
- Pinnacle Peak Pictures, an American evangelical Christian film studio

== See also ==
- Pinnacle (disambiguation)
- The Pinnacles (disambiguation)
