= Pinnacle (disambiguation) =

A pinnacle is an architectural feature.

Pinnacle(s) or The Pinnacle may also refer to:

== Architecture ==
- Pinnacle (Dhaka), a skyscraper in Dhaka, Bangladesh
- The Pinnacle, mid 1960s live music venue also known as the Shrine Auditorium in Los Angeles
- The Pinnacle (Atlanta), a business center in the Buckhead district of Atlanta, Georgia
- The Pinnacle (Bristol, Tennessee), a shopping center and commercial development
- The Pinnacle (Chicago), a residential skyscraper in Chicago, Illinois
- The Pinnacle (Cleveland), a condominium in downtown Cleveland, Ohio
- The Pinnacle (Guangzhou), a skyscraper in Guangzhou, China
- The Pinnacle, Hong Kong, a housing estate in Tseung Kwan O, Hong Kong
- The Pinnacle (Nairobi), a skyscraper in Nairobi, Kenya
- The Pinnacle@Duxton, a residential complex in Singapore
- The Pinnacle at Symphony Place, a skyscraper in Nashville, Tennessee
- 22 Bishopsgate, a skyscraper in London, United Kingdom, originally to be named The Pinnacle

== Businesses or products ==
- Pinnacle Airlines, a U.S. regional airline
- Pinnacle Armor, a U.S. armor manufacturer
- Pinnacle Books, a publisher of mass-market paperback books
- Pinnacle Brands, a former maker of trading cards
- Pinnacle Entertainment, a gaming and hospitality company
- Pinnacle Entertainment (United Kingdom), a former UK entertainment group
- Pinnacle Entertainment Group, a publisher of role-playing games and wargames
- Pinnacle Financial Partners, a U.S. banking and financial services company
- Pinnacle Foods, a packaged foods company headquartered in Mountain Lakes, New Jersey
- Pinnacle Golf
- Pinnacle Sports, an online gaming website
- Pinnacle Studio, a video editing application
- Pinnacle Systems, a digital video producer and distributor
- Pinnacle vodka

== Landforms ==
- Pinnacle (geology), a column or spire of rock
- Pinnacle Islands, disputed islands controlled by Japan in the East China Sea
- Pinnacle Peak (disambiguation), any of several summits
- Pinnacle Rock (Connecticut), United States, a mountain summit
- Pinnacle Rock (Galápagos), a famous landmark on Bartholemew Island in the Galapagos Archipelago, Ecuador
- Mount Pinacle, sometimes misspelled, in Coaticook, Quebec, Canada
- Mount Pinnacle, in Frelighsburg, Quebec, Canada
- The Pinnacle, Battle of Okinawa, a 30 ft spire near Arakachi, Japan
- The Pinnacle (Cape Breton), a peak in the Cape Breton Highlands, Nova Scotia, Canada
- The Pinnacle (Pennsylvania), United States, a peak
- The Pinnacle (sea stack), Dorset, England
- Inaccessible Pinnacle, a mountain on the Isle of Skye, Highland, Scotland
- The Pinnacles (disambiguation), several landforms
- Pūtangirua Pinnacles, in Wairarapa, New Zealand
- Trona Pinnacles, California, United States
- Underwater pinnacle

== Music ==
- Pinnacle (album), by the Irv Williams Trio, 2015
- Pinnacles (Edgar Froese album), 1983
- Pinnacles (J. J. Johnson album), 1980
- "Pinnacle", a song by Tone Damli, 2017
- "The Pinnacle", a song by Kansas from Masque, 1975

== Places ==
- Pinnacle, Queensland, Australia
- Pinnacles, Queensland, Australia, a suburb of Townsville
- Pinnacles Station, a pastoral lease in Western Australia
- Pinnacle, Montana, United States
- Pinnacle, North Carolina, United States

== Protected areas ==
In the United States:

- Pinnacle Rock State Park, Mercer County, West Virginia
- Pinnacle State Park and Golf Course, New York
- Pinnacles National Park, California

== Other uses ==
- Pinnacle (Mayfair Games), a 1986 fantasy role-playing game adventure
- Pinnacle (TV program), a 1982–2003 American weekend news program on CNN
- Pinnacle, a reporting flagword in the United States military nuclear incident terminology
- Pinnacle, a barley variety
- The Pinnacle (professional wrestling), a professional wrestling stable led by Maxwell Jacob Friedman

== See also ==
- Pinnacle Peak (disambiguation)
- The Pinnacles (disambiguation)
- Pinochle, a card game
