= The Pinnacles =

The Pinnacles may refer to geographical features including:

== Australia ==
- The Pinnacles (Atherton Tableland), Queensland, Australia
- The Pinnacles (South Australia), in Arkaroola Protection Area, Flinders Ranges
- The Pinnacles (Western Australia), in Nambung National Park

== United States ==
- The Pinnacles (Montana), a mountain range in Montana
- Pinnacles National Park, California

== Other countries ==
- The Pinnacles (Gulf of Mexico), reefs in the Gulf of Mexico off the coasts of Mississippi and Alabama
- The Pinnacles (Dorset), England
- The Pinnacles of Mount Api in Gunung Mulu National Park, Malaysia
- Pūtangirua Pinnacles, Wellington Region, New Zealand

== See also ==
- Pinnacle (disambiguation)
