= Mont Pinacle =

Mont Pinacle may refer to:

- Mount Pinacle in Coaticook, Quebec, Canada
- Mount Pinnacle in Frelighsburg, Quebec, Canada

== See also ==
- Pinnacle (disambiguation)
