= Underwater pinnacle =

Underwater pillar-like rock or coral formation

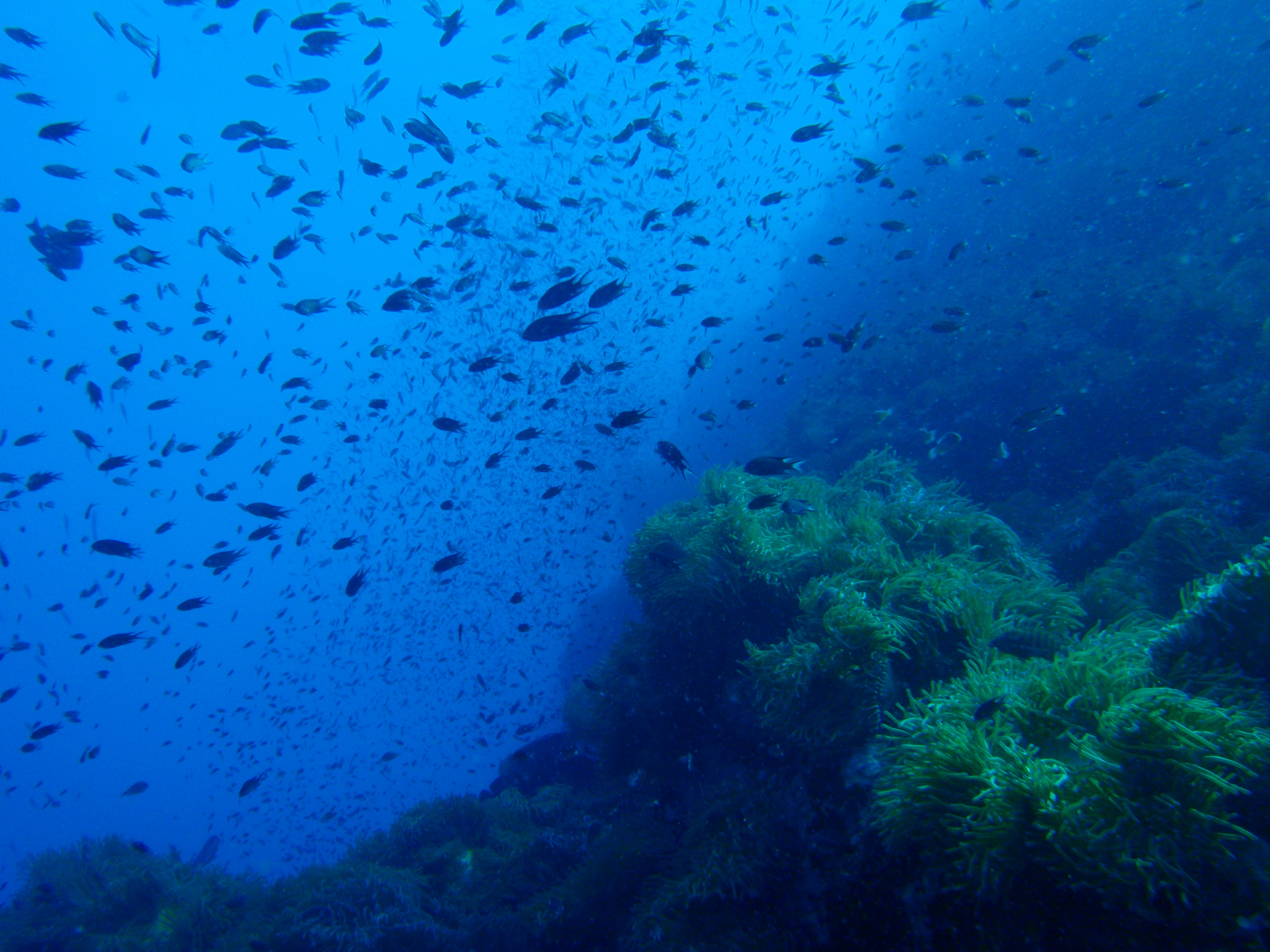
Southwest Pinnacle, Ko Tao, Thailand

An underwater pinnacle is a steep, pillar-like geological or coral structure that rises abruptly from the seafloor but does not break the ocean surface.

Because they often crest near the sea surface, underwater pinnacles are popular scuba-diving destinations, but they also present significant navigational hazards to marine vessels.

== Comparisons with seamounts and guyots ==
A guyot features a distinct flat summit, while a typical seamount has more gentle slopes and a summit at least 2,000 feet (610 m) below the sea surface.

By definition, a seamount rises at least 3,000 feet (910 m) above the surrounding deep-sea floor and is a volcanic mountain.

In contrast, underwater pinnacles are generally much smaller in total volume than seamounts or guyots, feature significantly steeper vertical walls, and can have summits that sit just below the water line. Usually they are near the shore or are parts of other underwater topography.

== Scientific significance ==
The steep vertical profiles of underwater pinnacles force localized shifting of deep ocean currents, generating strong upwelling zones, bringing nutrients which drive immense biological productivity. Marine biologists target underwater pinnacles because their relative geographic isolation makes them excellent laboratories for studying biological evolution and species distribution.

Geologically, their structural layers offer researchers core data regarding prehistoric ocean circulation, plate tectonics, and localized volcanic history.

== Coral Pinnacles ==
A coral reef can form pinnacles. Coral pinnacles support rich, dense marine ecosystems, including sea anemones, sponges, specialized reef corals, and schooling fish.

They rise from the surrounding lagoon bottom or flat seafloor. Their heights can reach several meters, and they may rise near the surface. They may support high biodiversity, and currents are often strong.

== Formation ==
Like seamounts, some underwater pinnacles begin as volcanic features, manifesting as heavily eroded volcanic cones or the jagged remains of collapsed caldera complexes. Others are formed via tectonic uplift or faulting, where blocks of seafloor bedrock are forced upward.

In warm, tropical marine environments, biogenic coral reefs can colonize these raised bedrock platforms, growing upward over millennia to construct massive carbonate pinnacle structures.

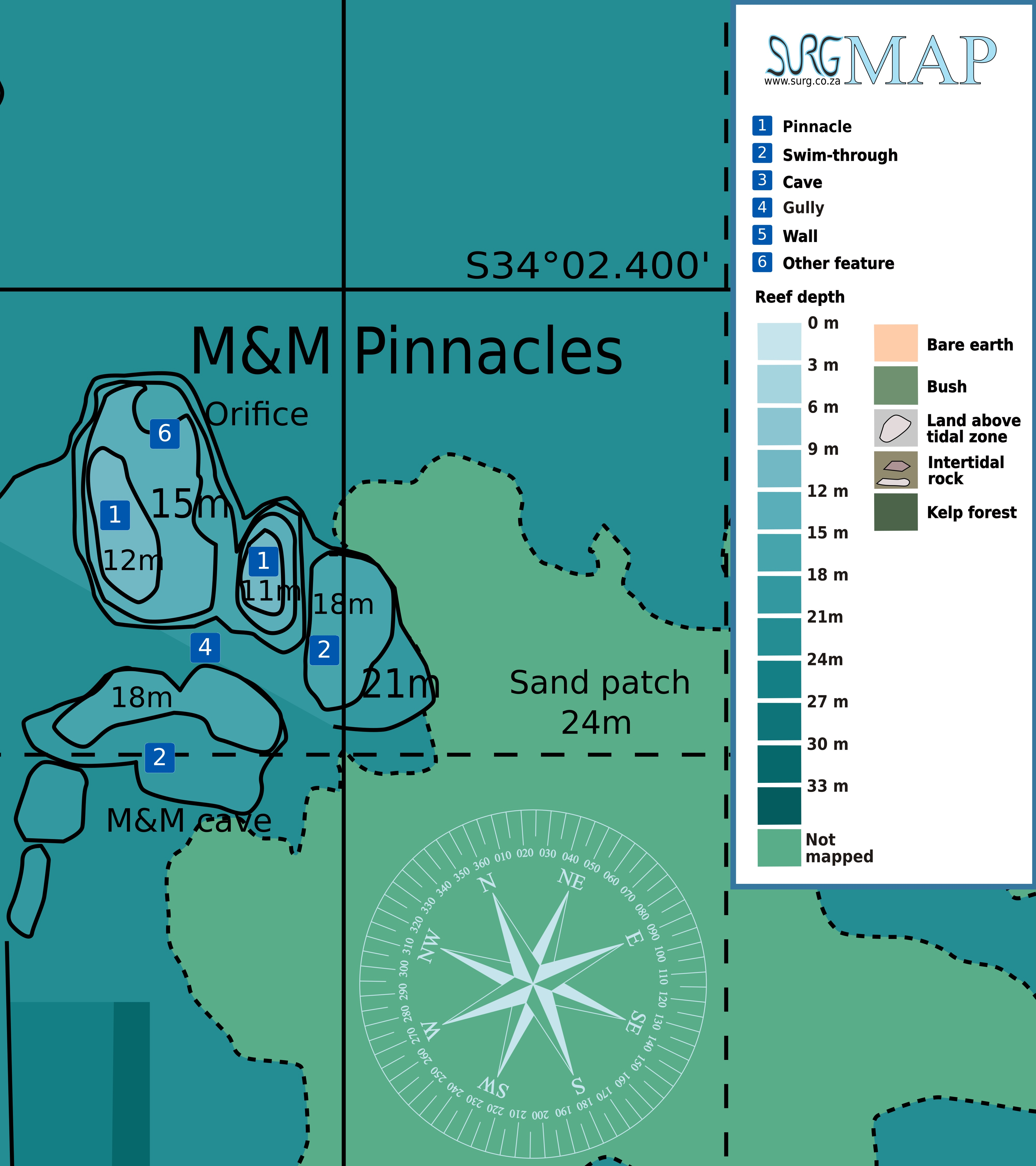
Map of the dive site the M&M pinnacles off the West coast of the Cape Peninsula, South Africa

== Hazards to navigation ==
Because they rise abruptly out of profound ocean depths, underwater pinnacles can be exceptionally difficult to detect without high-resolution sonar or precise nautical charts. This steep vertical trajectory poses a severe collision risk to surface ships and submerged submarines alike. Maritime collisions with these formations can cause:

- coral reef destruction
- hull breaches
- loss of propulsion or steering control
- loss of the vessel and/or lives
- catastrophic oil and hazardous-material spills

=== Incidents ===
- Off Attu Island in 1943, the SS Dellwood sank after striking an uncharted underwater pinnacle.
- On 26 May 2008, the nuclear submarine HMS Superb collided with an underwater pinnacle in the Red Sea. While the crew escaped injury, the vessel sustained unrepairable structural damage and was subsequently decommissioned.

== Recreational diving ==
The reliable upwelling currents surrounding pinnacles sustain highly active local food webs, making them world-class scuba-diving locations. However, because their vertical walls sit completely exposed to open ocean currents, they frequently experience fierce, unpredictable surges. Consequently, many pinnacle dive sites require advanced certifications and are restricted to highly experienced divers.

== See also ==
- Flower Garden Banks National Marine Sanctuary
- Gulf of Corryvreckan – features a notorious tidal pinnacle mentioned by George Orwell
- Guyot
- Knoll (oceanography)
- Ko Tao – Thai island known for its deep pinnacle dive sites
- Lava pillars
- Maro Reef
- Pinnacle (geology)
- Seamount
- Sisters' Rock
- The Pinnacles
