= The Castle (Washington) =

Mountain in Washington (state), United States

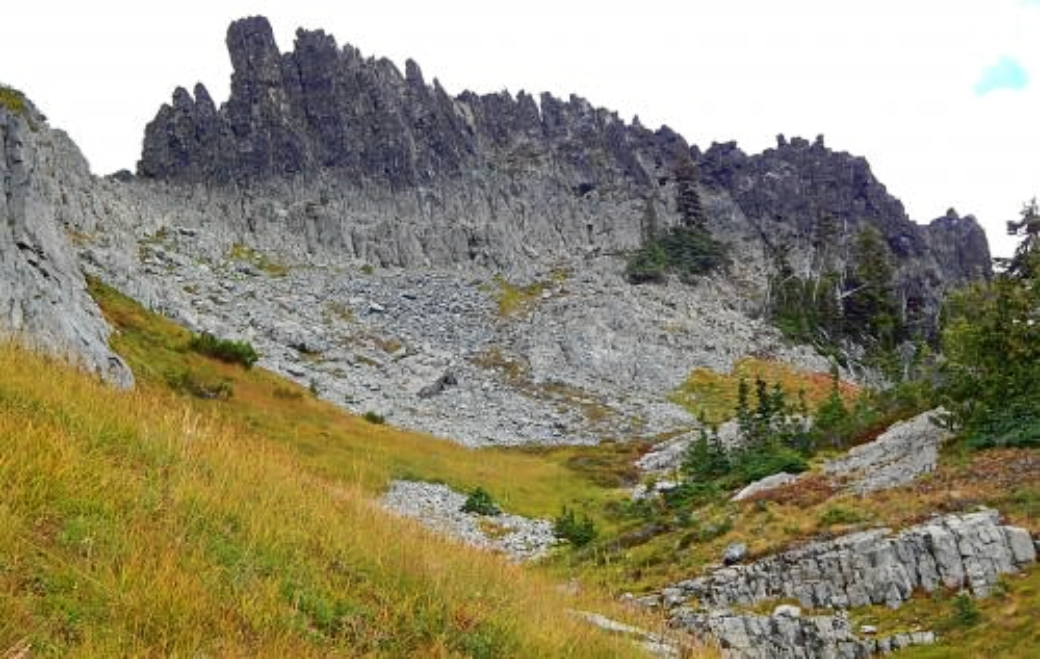
- The Castle, south side

Highest point
- Elevation: 6,440 ft (1,963 m)
- Prominence: 200 ft (61 m)
- Parent peak: Pinnacle Peak
- Isolation: 0.18 mi (0.29 km)
- Coordinates: 46°45′28″N 121°43′42″W

Geography
- Location within Washington (state) Location within the United States
- Country: United States
- State: Washington
- County: Lewis
- Protected area: Mount Rainier National Park
- Parent range: Cascades
- Topo map: USGS Mount Rainier East

Climbing
- Easiest route: Climbing class 5

The Castle is a summit in Lewis County of Washington state. It is part of the Tatoosh Range which is a sub-range of the Cascade Range. The Castle is located in Mount Rainier National Park, and it is 0.2 mile immediately east of Pinnacle Peak. Precipitation runoff from The Castle drains into tributaries of the Cowlitz River.

== Climbing ==
The Pinnacle Saddle Trailhead is located at Reflection Lakes and the trail to the saddle is over a mile in length. From the saddle, a climber's path traverses the south slope of Pinnacle Peak. Reaching the summit of The Castle is minimum class 4 scrambling, with class 5 climbing options.

== Climate ==
The Castle is located in the marine west coast climate zone of western North America. Most weather fronts originating in the Pacific Ocean travel northeast toward the Cascade Mountains. As fronts approach, they are forced upward by the peaks of the Cascade Range (orographic lift), causing them to drop their moisture in the form of rain or snow onto the Cascades. As a result, the west side of the Cascades experiences high precipitation, especially during the winter months in the form of snowfall. Because of maritime influence, snow tends to be wet and heavy, resulting in avalanche danger. During winter months, weather is usually cloudy, but due to high pressure systems over the Pacific Ocean that intensify during summer months, there is often little or no cloud cover during the summer.

== Gallery ==
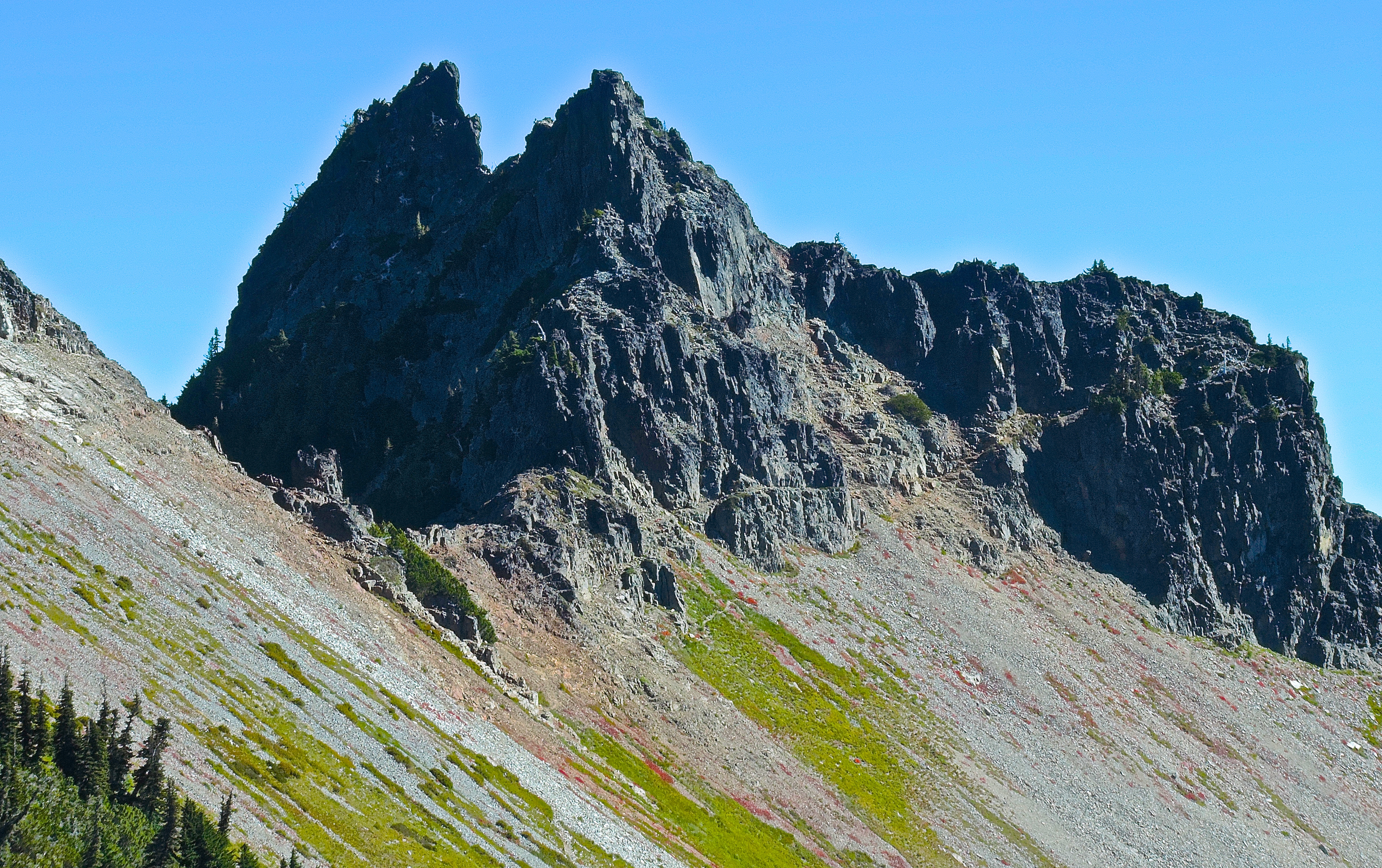
The Castle from west

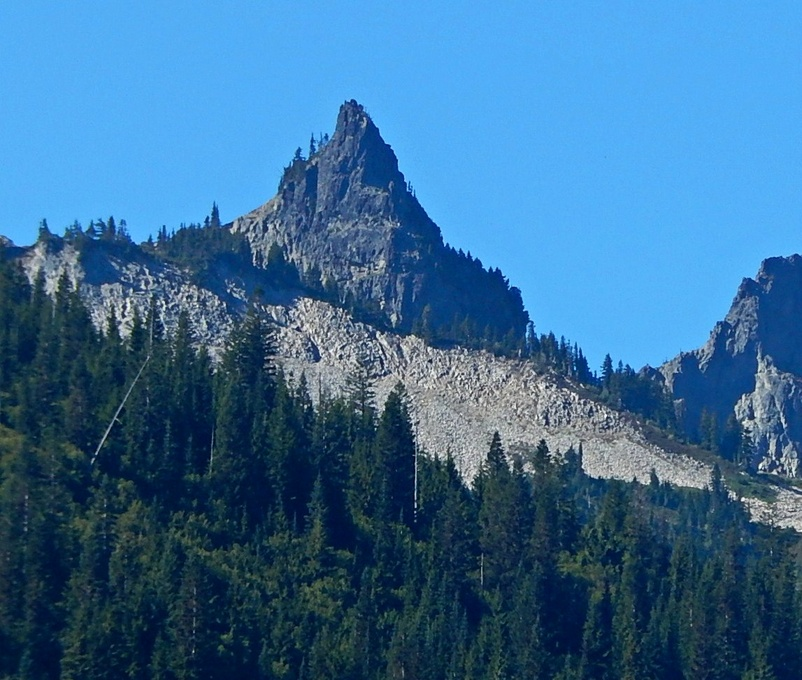
The Castle from east

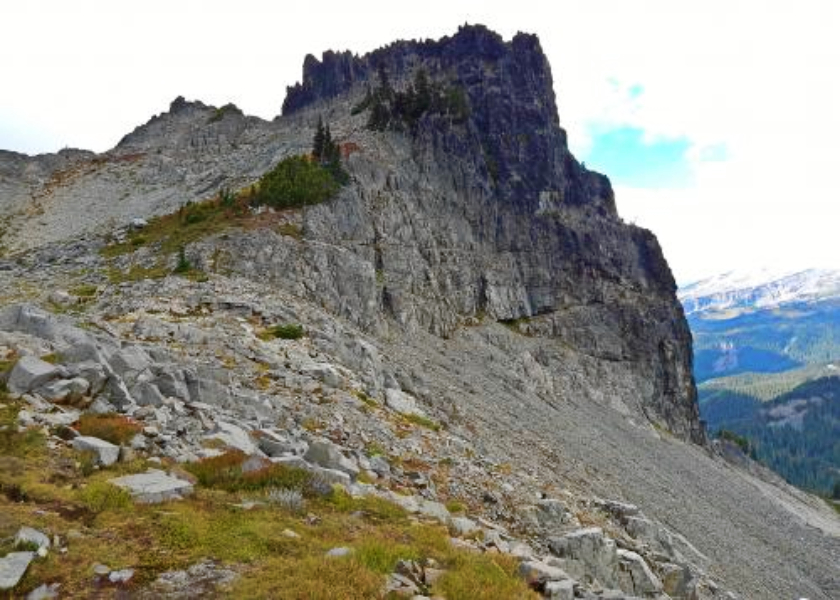
The Castle from the southeast

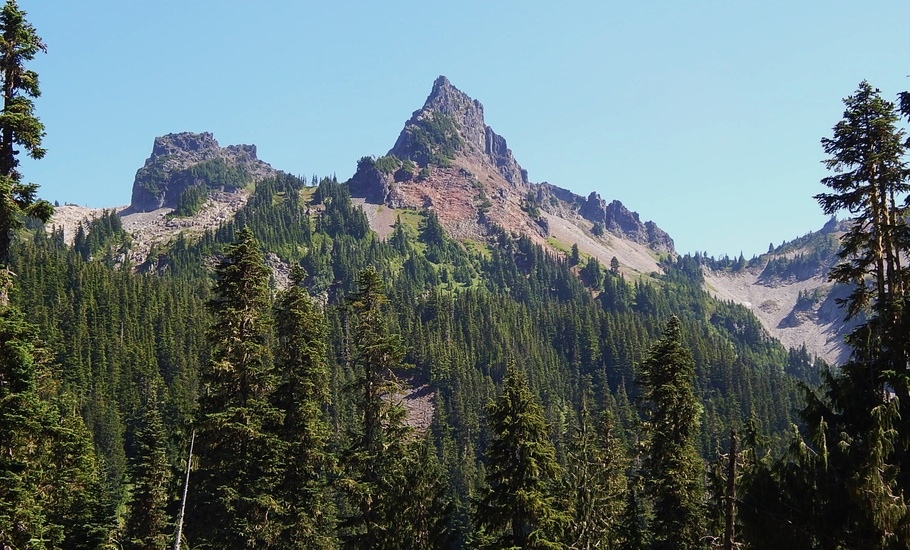
The Castle (left) and Pinnacle (center)

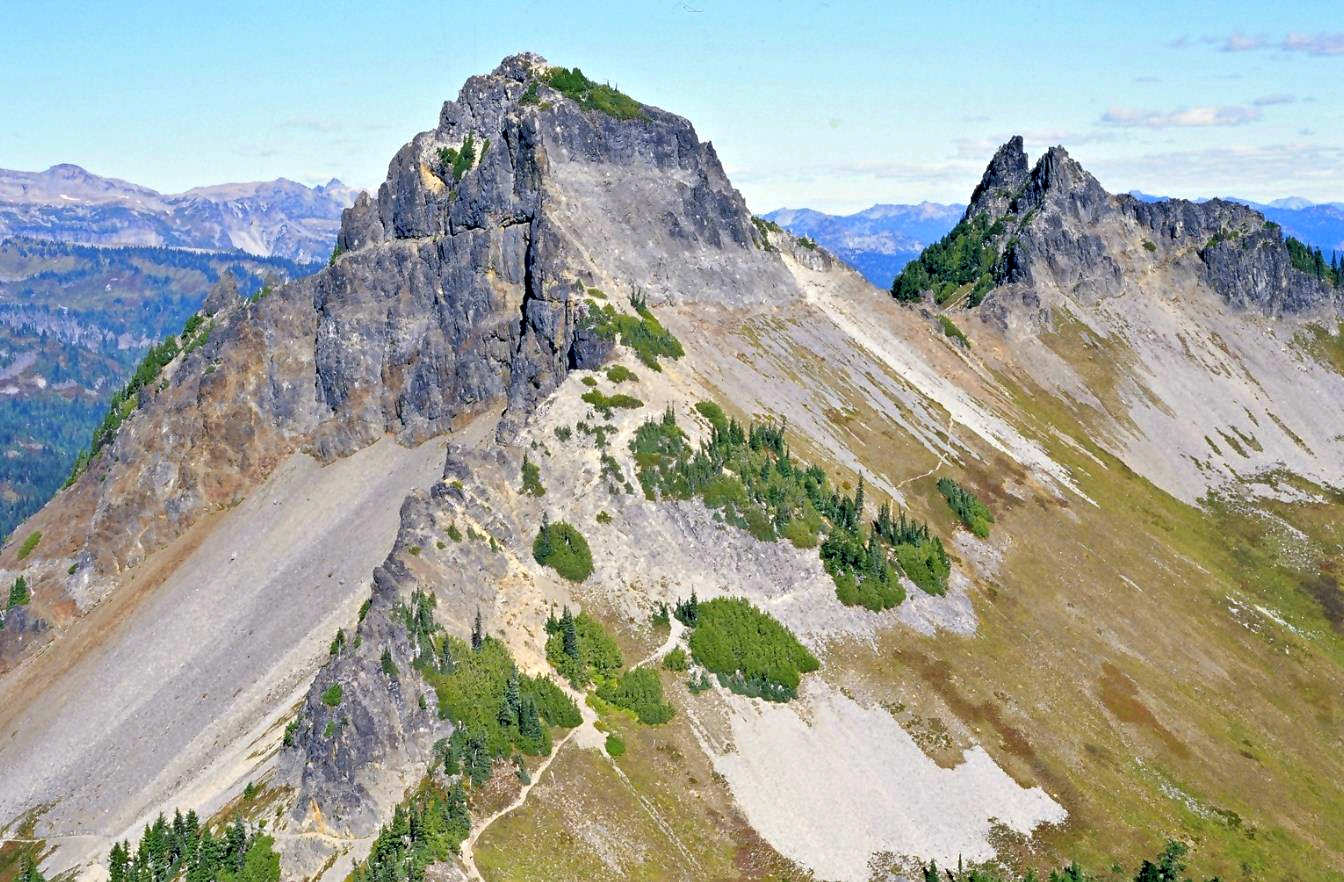
Pinnacle Peak with The Castle (right)

== See also ==
- List of geographic features in Lewis County, Washington
