= Pinnacle Peak (Lewis County, Washington) =

Mountain in Washington (state), United States

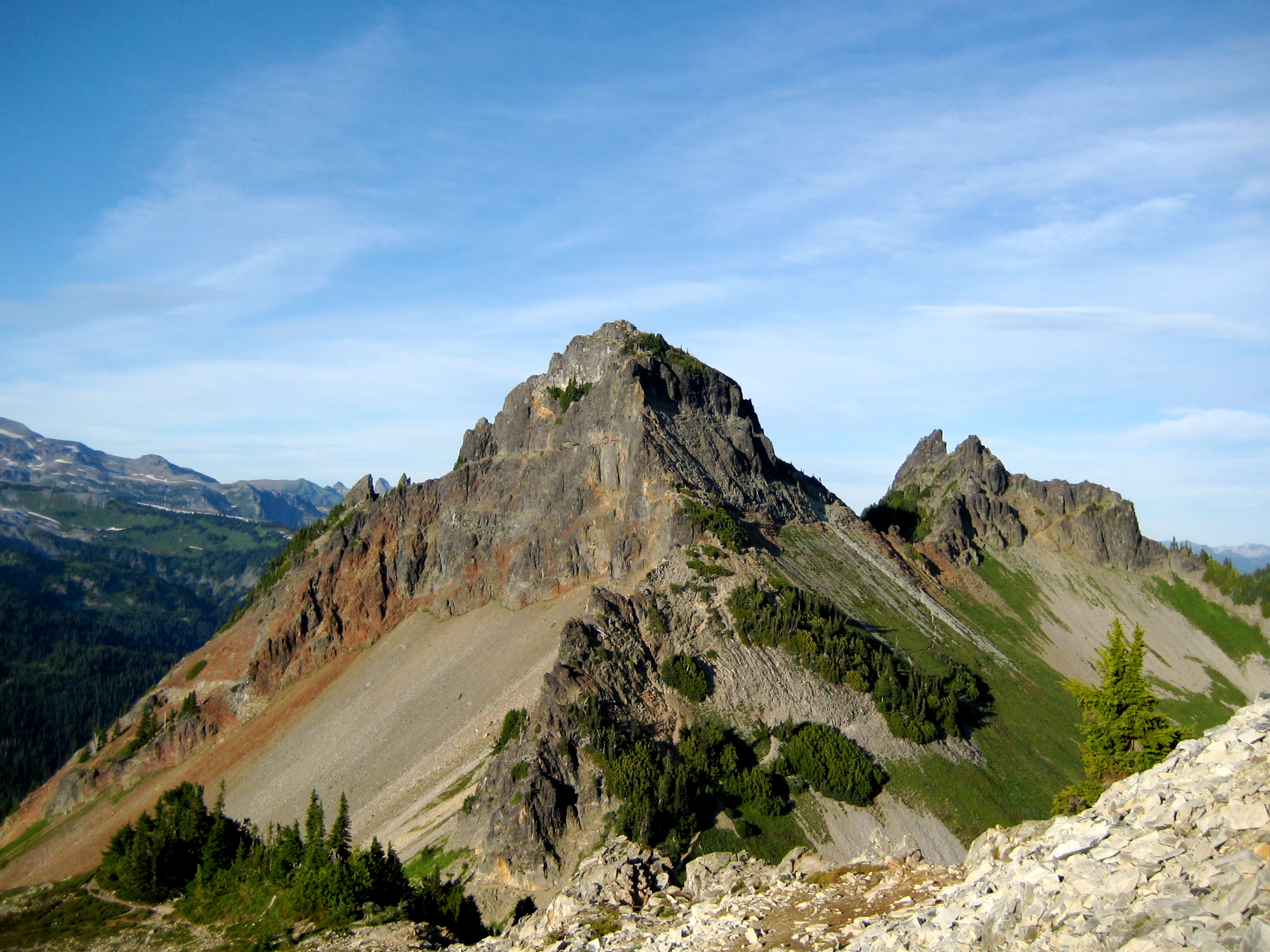
- Pinnacle Peak and The Castle (right) from Plummer Peak

Highest point
- Elevation: 6,562 ft (2,000 m) NGVD 29
- Prominence: 562 ft (171 m)
- Coordinates: 46°45′29″N 121°43′57″W

Geography
- Location within Washington (state)
- Location: Mount Rainier National Park, Washington, U.S.
- Parent range: Cascades, Tatoosh Range
- Topo map: USGS Mount Rainier East

Climbing
- Easiest route: Scrambling south face

Pinnacle Peak is a 6,562 ft (2,000 m) peak located in Mount Rainier National Park in Lewis County, Washington. It is the second highest peak in the Tatoosh Range. There are two other Washington summits with the same name: Pinnacle Peak near Enumclaw, Washington, roughly 30 miles (50 km) to the northwest, and Pinnacle Peak in North Cascades State Park.

The trail to the saddle and summit has views of Rainier. Some scrambling and rock climbing is needed to attain the summit. The Castle is situated 0.2 miles (0.32 km) to the east.

== Climate ==
Pinnacle Peak is located in the marine west coast climate zone of western North America. Most weather fronts originate in the Pacific Ocean, and travel northeast toward the Cascade Mountains. As fronts approach, they are forced upward by the peaks of the Cascade Range (orographic lift), causing them to drop their moisture in the form of rain or snowfall onto the Cascades. As a result, the west side of the Cascades experiences high precipitation, especially during the winter months in the form of snowfall. During winter months, weather is usually cloudy, but, due to high pressure systems over the Pacific Ocean that intensify during summer months, there is often little or no cloud cover during the summer. Because of maritime influence, snow tends to be wet and heavy.

== Gallery ==
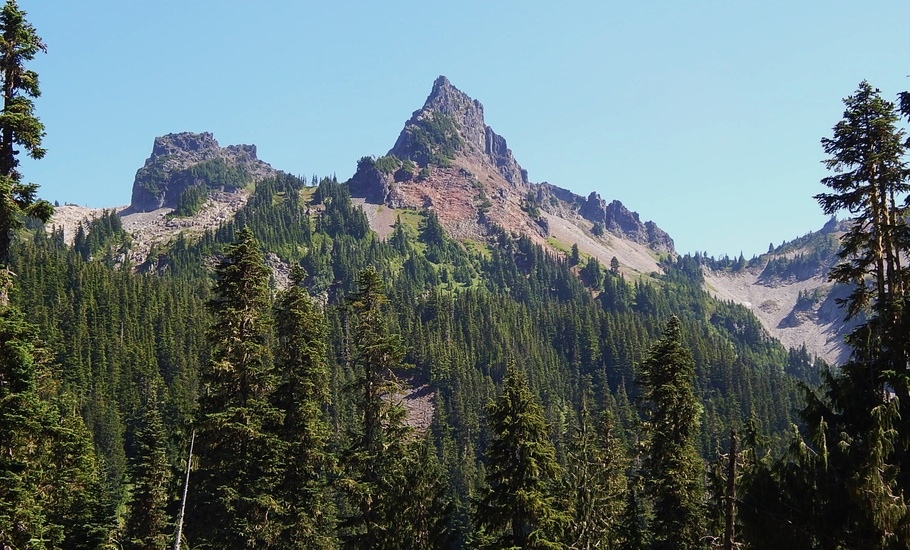
The Castle (left) and Pinnacle Peak (center)

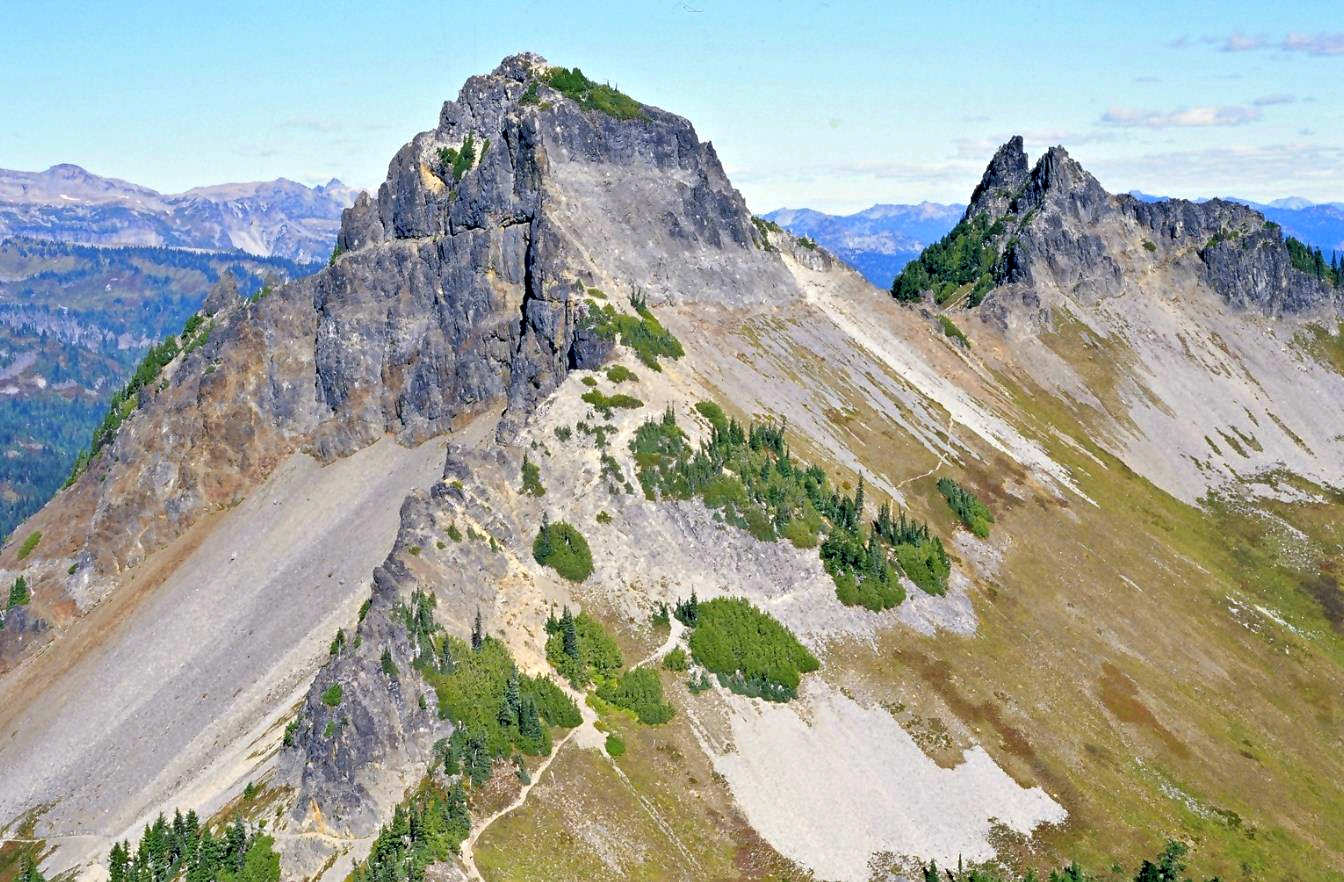
Pinnacle Peak with The Castle (right)

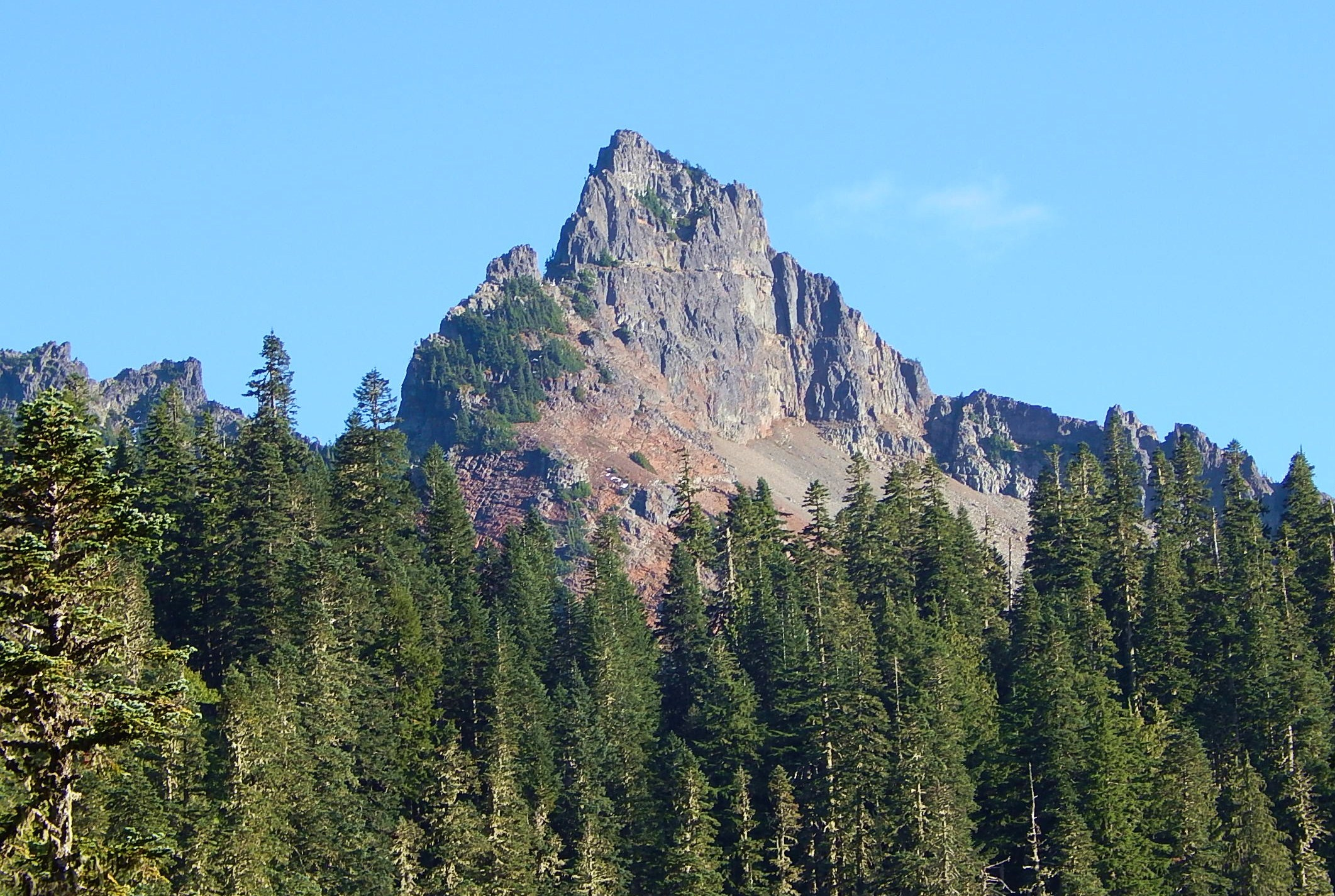
Pinnacle Peak

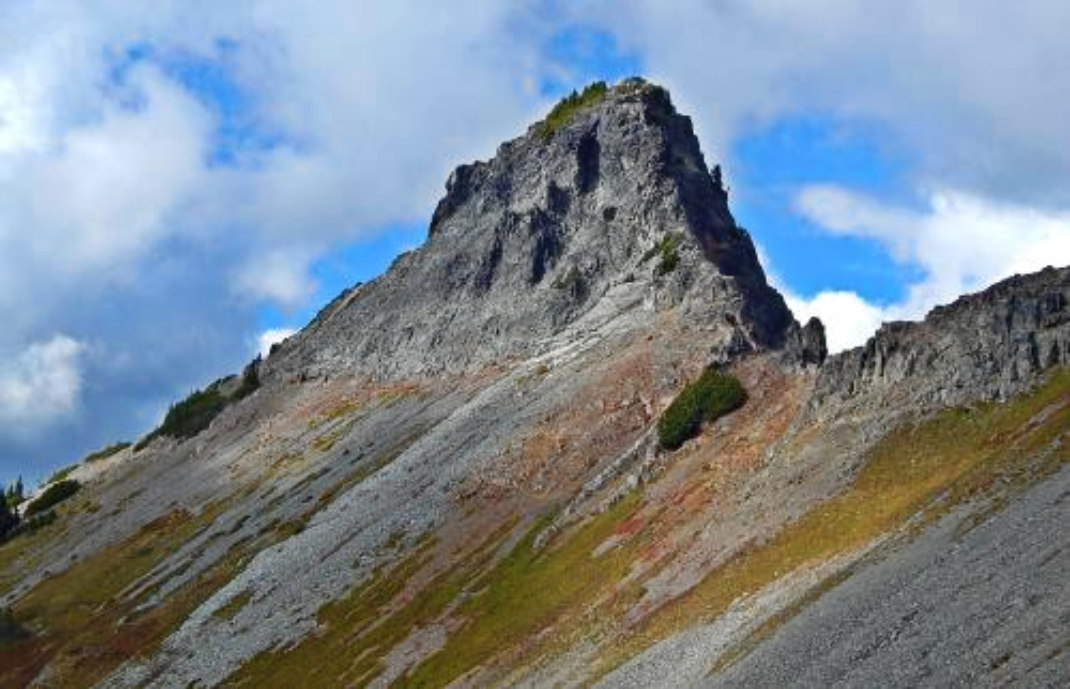
The southeast aspect of Pinnacle Peak

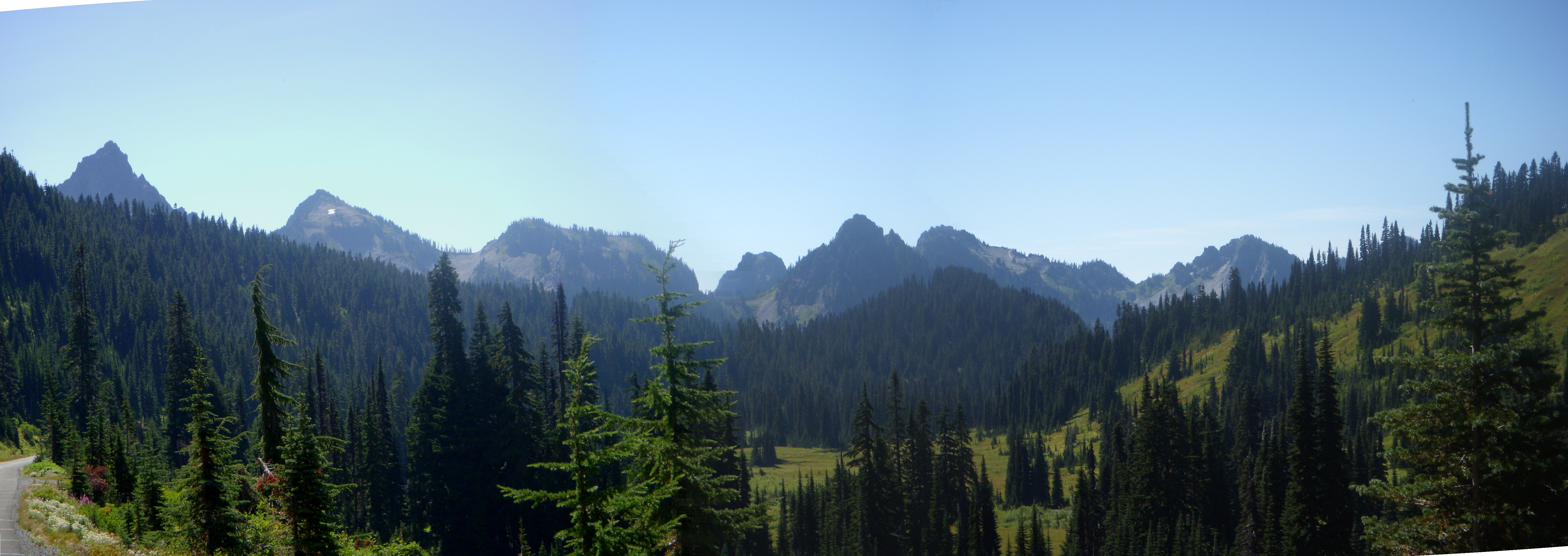
The Tatoosh Range, taken near Paradise

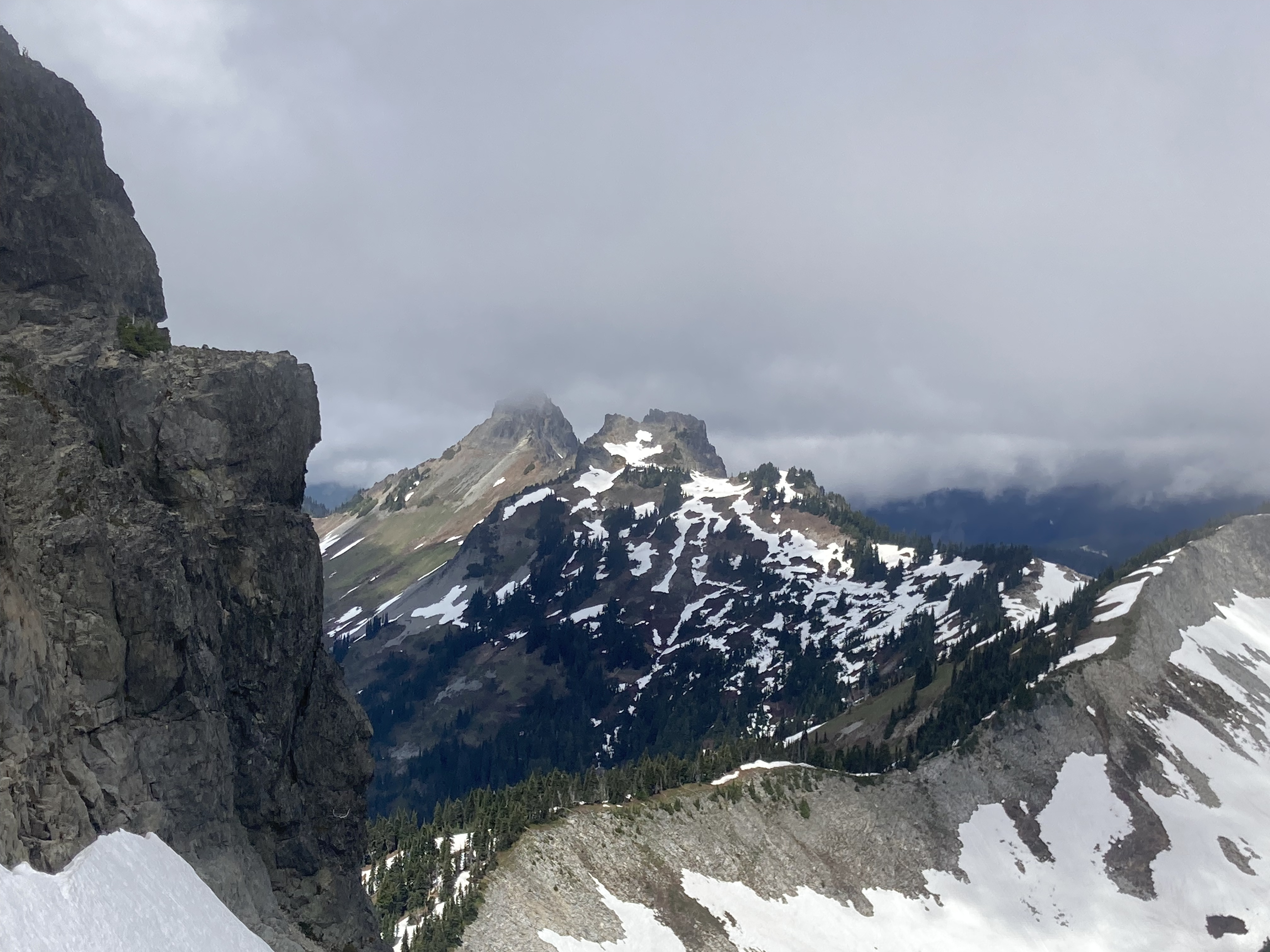
Pinnacle Peak from Unicorn Peak

== See also ==
- List of geographic features in Lewis County, Washington
