= Pinnacle Peak (King County, Washington) =

Mountain in Washington (state), United States

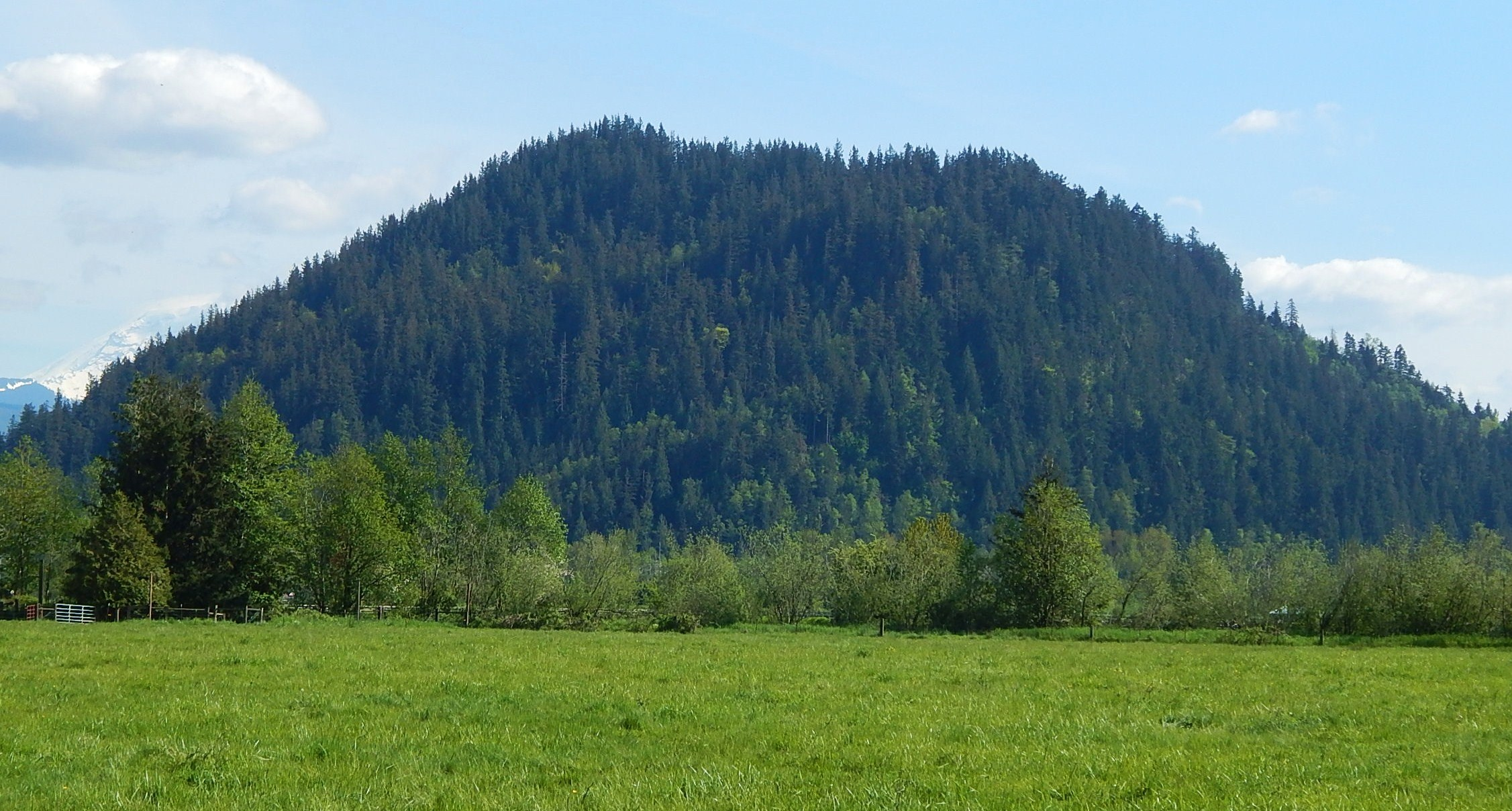
- Pinnacle Peak seen from the north

Highest point
- Elevation: 1,801 ft (549 m)
- Prominence: 981 ft (299 m)
- Parent peak: Radio Hill (1,950 ft)
- Isolation: 3.39 mi (5.46 km)
- Coordinates: 47°10′25″N 121°58′24″W

Geography
- Location within Washington (state) Location within the United States
- Country: United States
- State: Washington
- County: King
- Parent range: Cascade Range
- Topo map: USGS Enumclaw

Geology
- Rock type: Basalt

Climbing
- Easiest route: Hiking trail

Pinnacle Peak, also known as Mount Peak, is an 1,801-foot-elevation forest-covered summit located in King County of Washington state. It is part of the Cascade Range and is set at the western edge of the range, immediately south of Enumclaw, Washington and 25 miles northwest of Mount Rainier. There are two other Washington summits with the same name: Pinnacle Peak (Lewis County, Washington) in the Tatoosh Range to the south of Mount Rainier, and Pinnacle Peak (Whatcom County, Washington) in North Cascades National Park.

== History ==
First called Mount Pete for Pete Chorak, an early Enumclaw settler, Pete became misheard as Peak, and the name Mount Peak received some followers. A former fire lookout built on the summit was called the Pinnacle Peak Lookout, hence the name Pinnacle Peak emerged. The one mile trail on the north side of Pinnacle Peak is called the Cal Magnusson Trail for a long time Cascade mountaineer who worked at REI for 25 years with famed American mountain climber Jim Whittaker.

== Climate ==
Pinnacle Peak is located in the marine west coast climate zone of western North America. Weather fronts originating in the Pacific Ocean travel northeast toward the Cascade Mountains. As fronts approach, they are forced upward by the peaks of the Cascade Range, causing them to drop their moisture in the form of rain or snow onto the Cascades (Orographic lift). As a result, the west side of the Cascades experiences high precipitation, especially during the winter months in the form of snowfall. During winter months, weather is usually cloudy, but due to high pressure systems over the Pacific Ocean that intensify during summer months, there is often little or no cloud cover during the summer. Precipitation runoff from the peak drains into the White River which cuts below the south base of the peak.

== Geology ==
Pinnacle Peak is a 1,000-foot (300 m) extinct volcanic cinder cone rising up from the flat farmlands surrounding Enumclaw. This flat terrain was created by the Osceola Mudflow that spread from nearby Mount Rainier approximately 5,600 years ago. Some of Pinnacle Peak is buried beneath this mudflow since the peak predates the mudflow. Extruded outcroppings of columnar basalt can be seen along the trails near the top of the peak.

== Hiking ==
The 256 acre Pinnacle Peak is encompassed by the 334 acre Pinnacle Peak Park. The steep, forested, one mile Cal Magnusson Trail is located on the north side of the peak. The south slope trail has more parking and more gradual grade along a gravel road and trail, with a couple views looking south to Mount Rainier and west to Buckley, Washington. On a busy weekend the trails will see 300-400 visitors per day. It is a popular hike for locals and those in training to climb Mt. Rainier. In 2017, plans for rebuilding the historic fire lookout tower were budgeted. In 2021, a lookout was reconstructed and modelled similar to the historic one. The summit is covered by tall trees, so there are minimal views only to the west from the lookout.

== Gallery ==
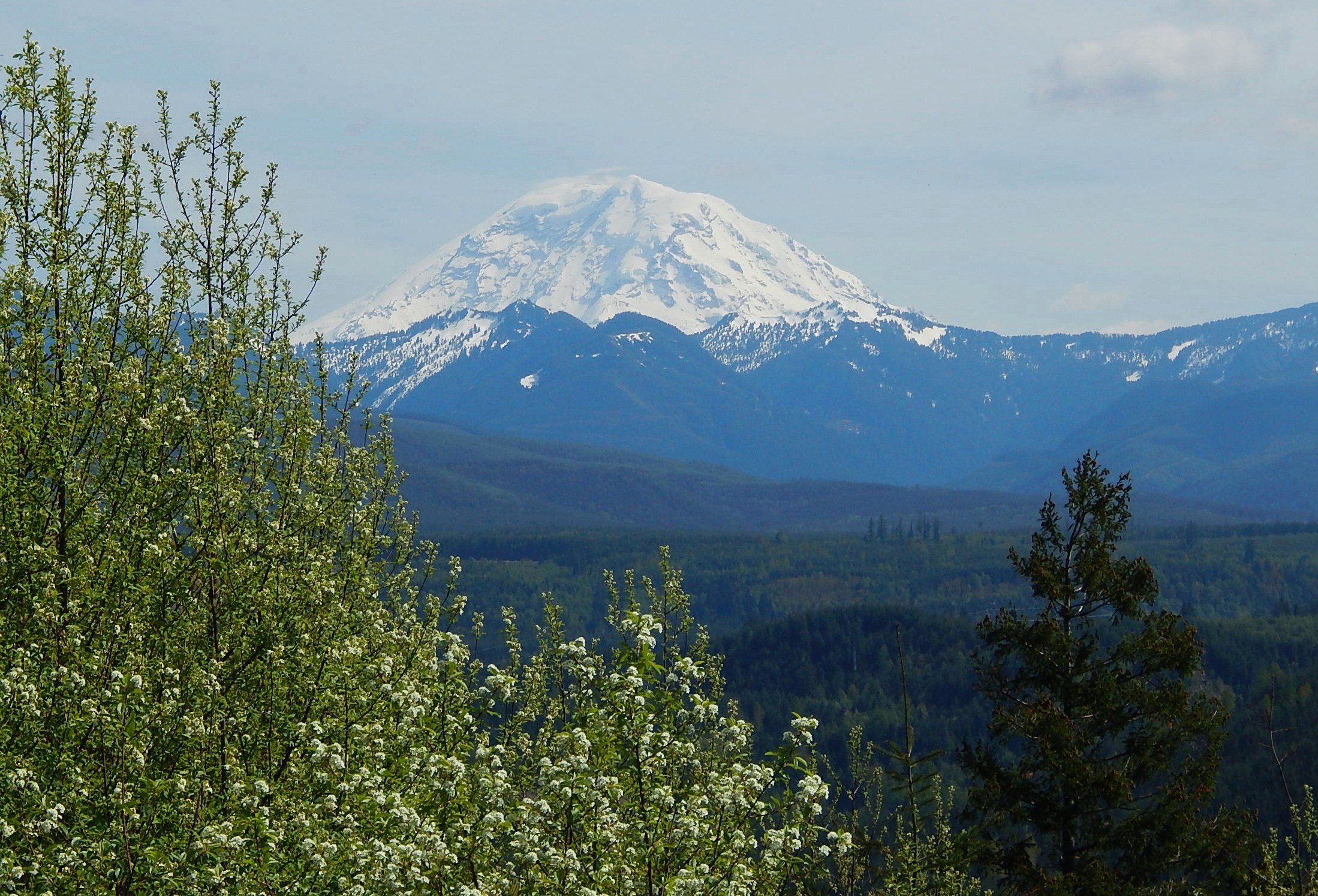
Mount Rainier seen from south side trail

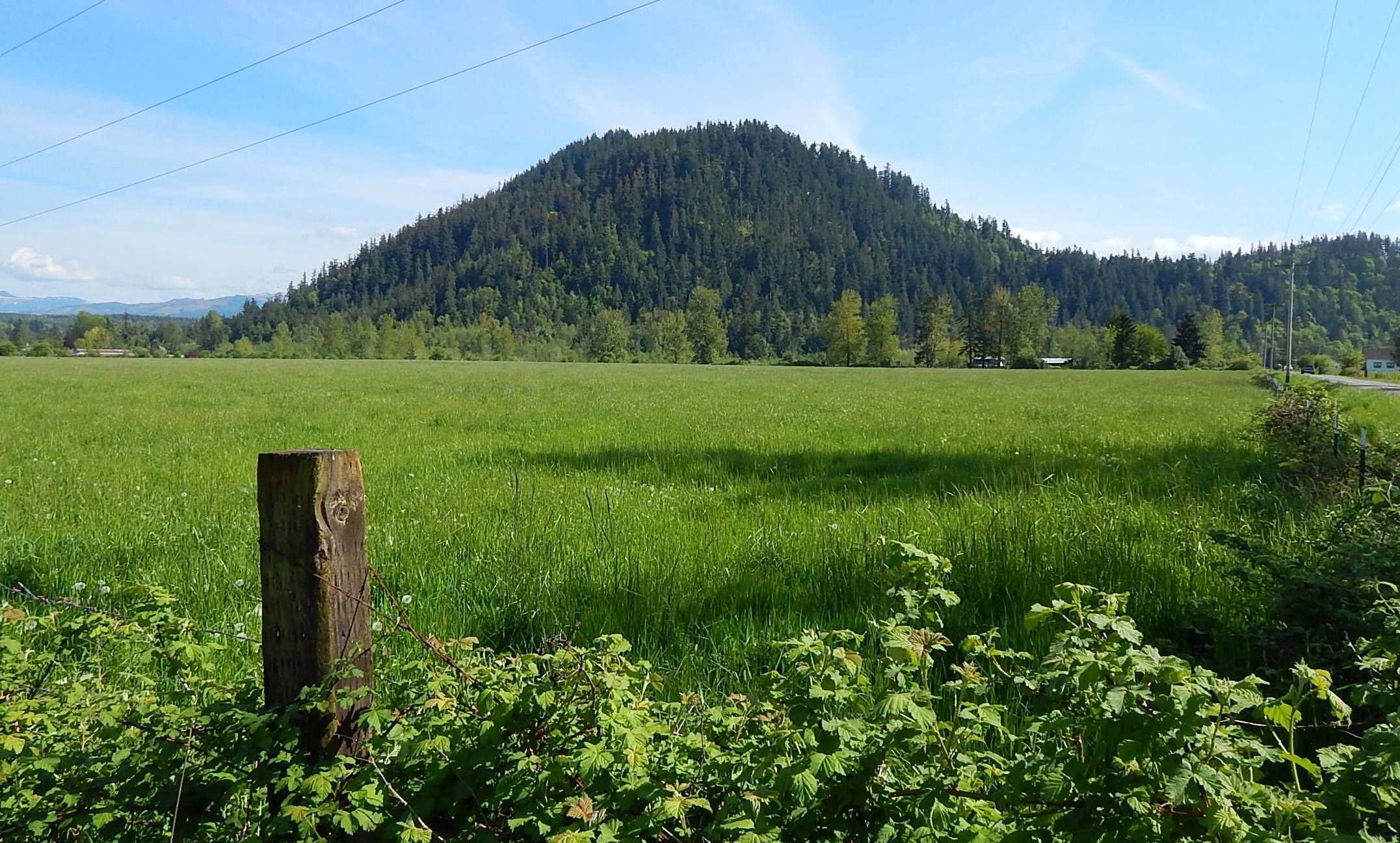
Pinnacle Peak

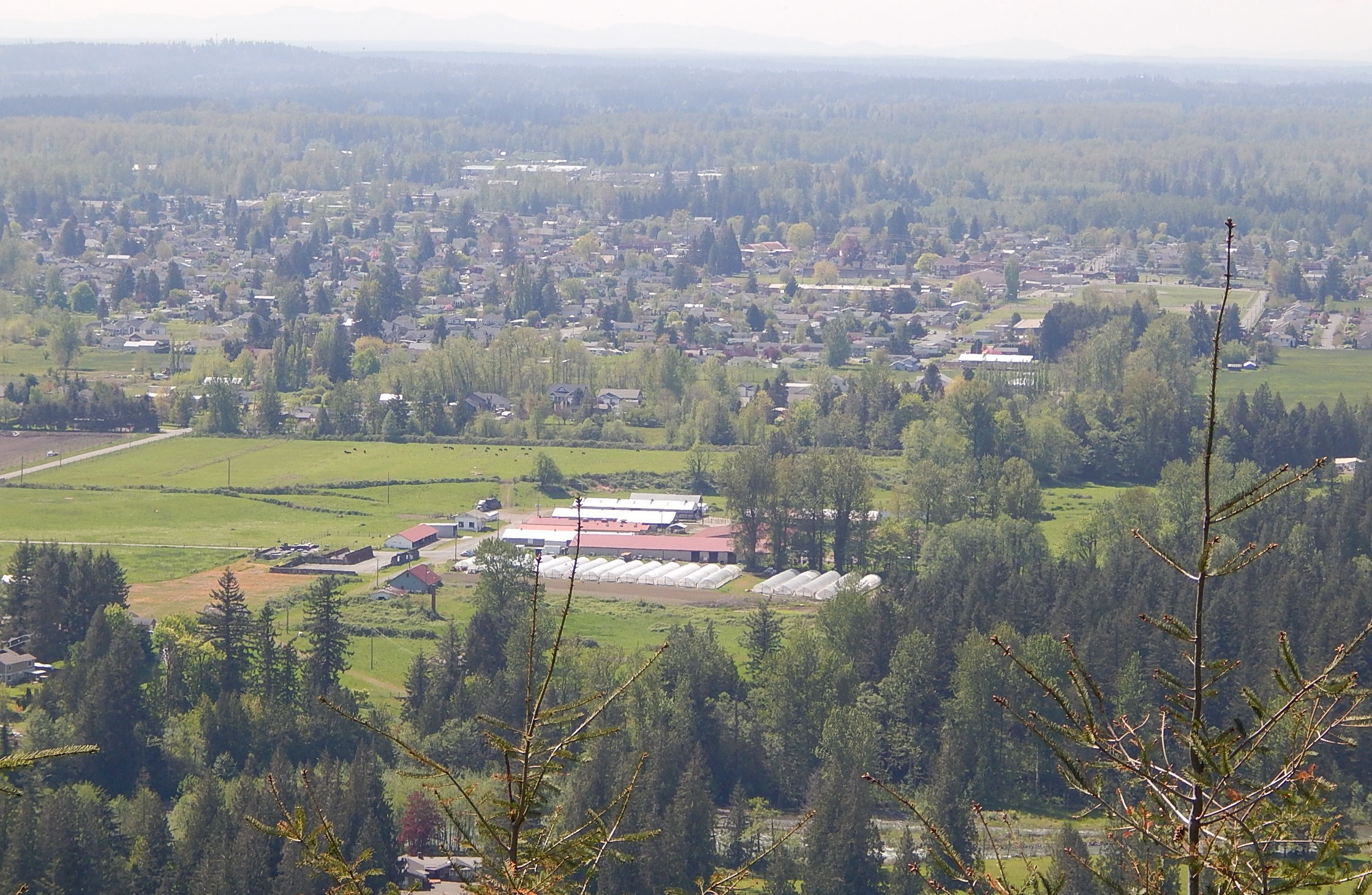
Buckley seen from south side trail

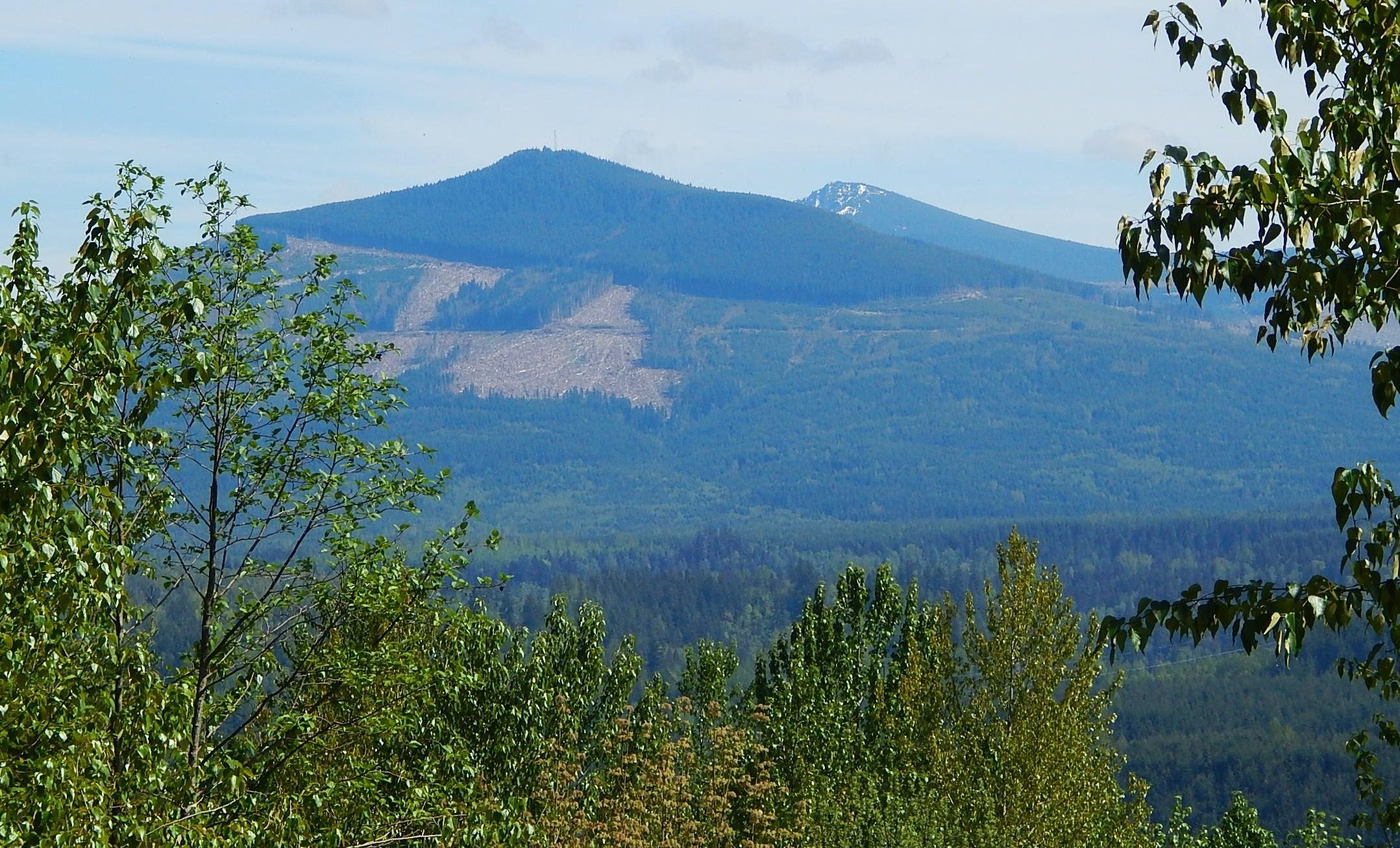
The Three Sisters seen from trail

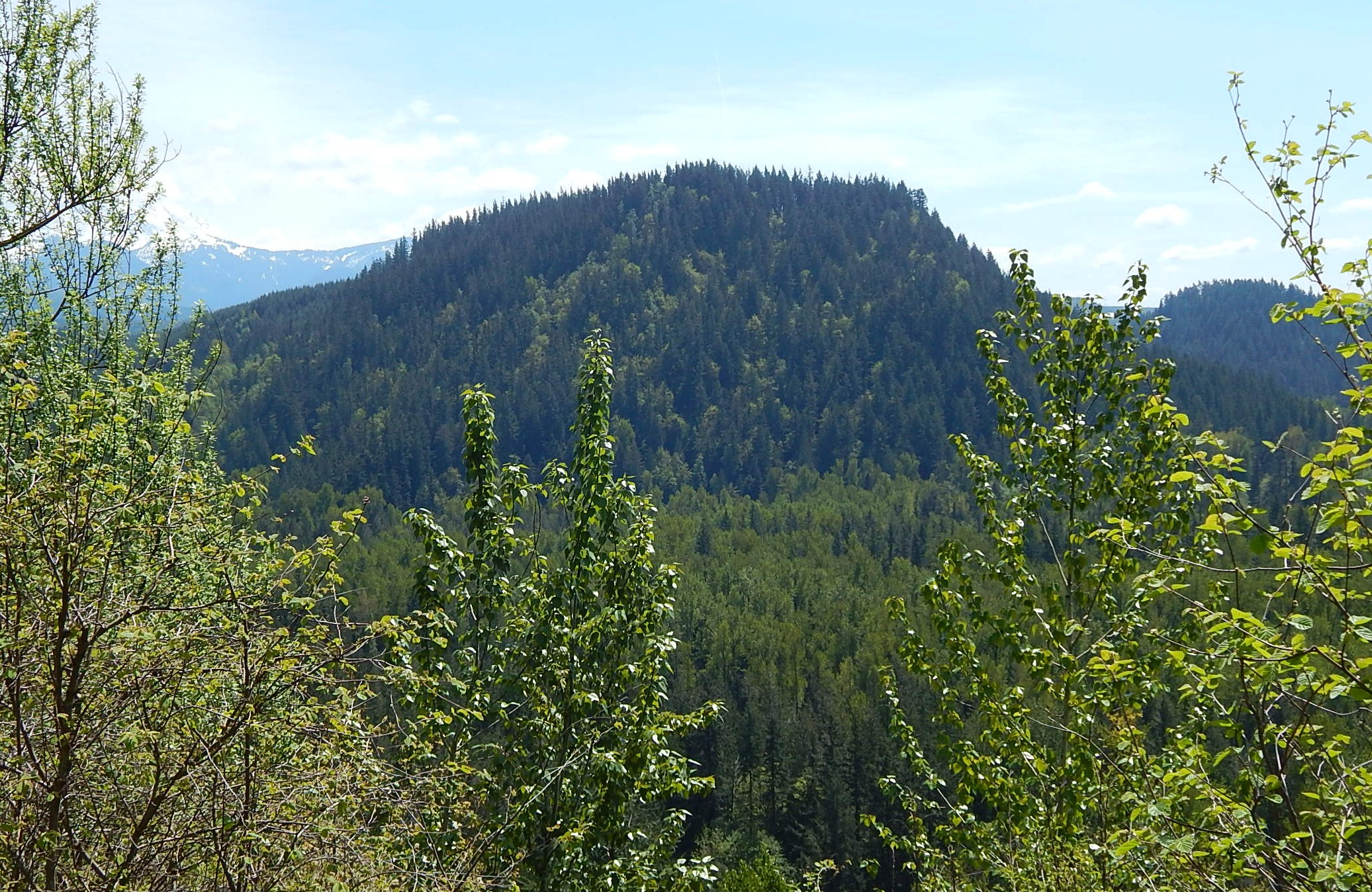
Long Hill seen from south side trail

Pinnacle Peak lookout tower

Pinnacle Peak placard
