= Unicorn Peak (Olympic Mountains) =

Mountain in Washington (state), United States

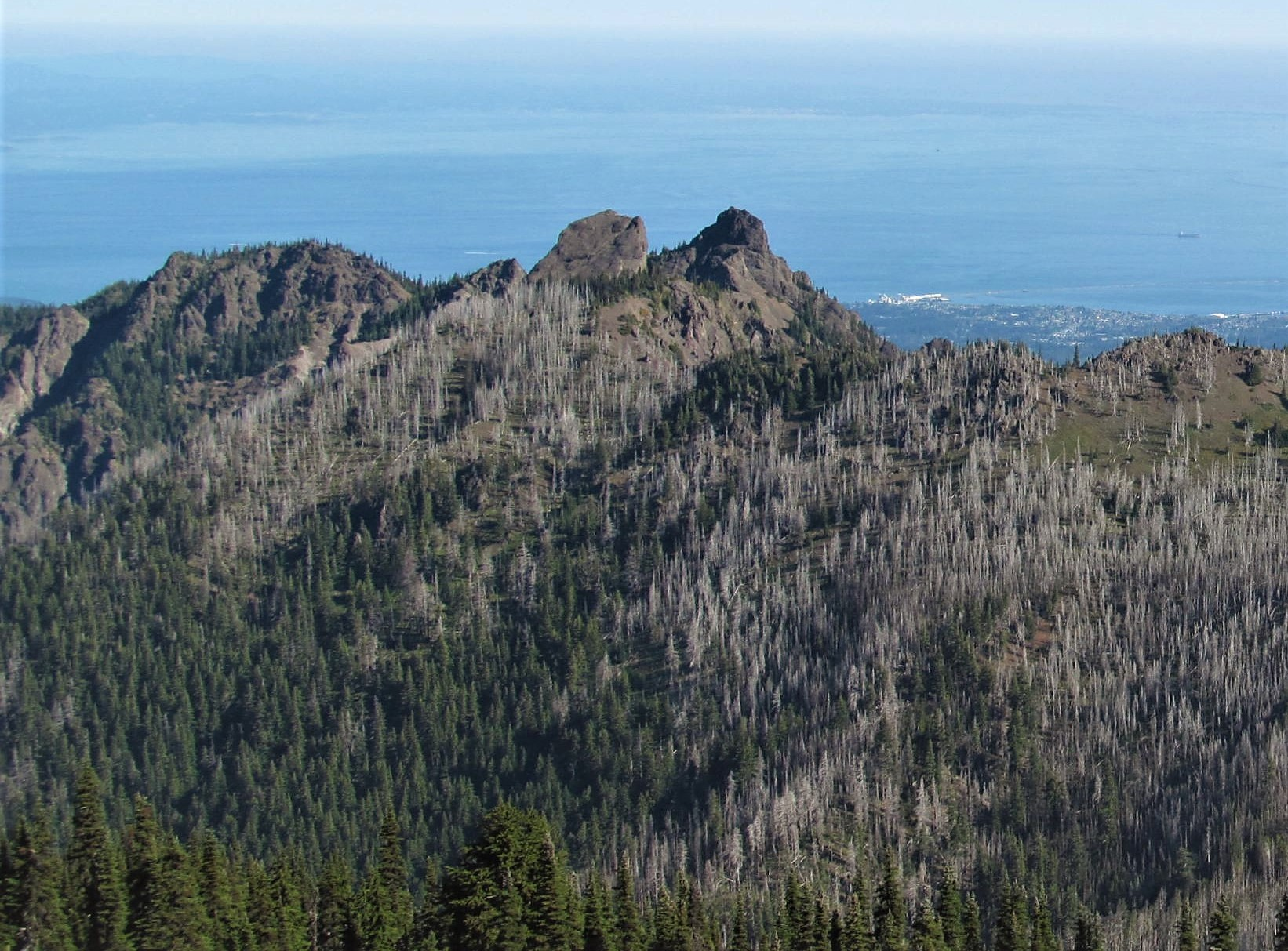
- South aspect, as viewed from Hurricane Hill

Highest point
- Elevation: 5,100 ft (1,554 m)
- Prominence: 650 ft (200 m)
- Parent peak: Hurricane Hill (5,757 ft)
- Isolation: 1.47 mi (2.37 km)
- Coordinates: 48°00′39″N 123°31′20″W

Geography
- Location within Washington (state) Location within the United States
- Country: United States
- State: Washington
- County: Clallam
- Protected area: Olympic National Park
- Parent range: Olympic Mountains
- Topo map: USGS Elwha

Geology
- Rock age: Eocene

Climbing
- Easiest route: class 3 scrambling

Unicorn Peak is a 5,100-foot-elevation (1,554-meter) mountain summit located within Olympic National Park in Clallam County of Washington state. Unicorn Peak is situated seven miles southwest of Port Angeles and three miles north-northwest of the park's Hurricane Ridge visitor center, in Daniel J. Evans Wilderness. Precipitation runoff from the mountain drains west to the Elwha River via Little River and Griff Creek. Topographic relief is significant as the west aspect rises 4,800 feet (1,463 meters) above the Elwha valley in approximately three miles.

== History ==
This landform has also been called "Unicorn Peaks", and "The Pinchers", as in crab pinchers. This refers to the appearance of the summit and a 5,050-foot-elevation peak on the peak's northeast aspect, which is known as "Unicorn Horn". Klallam legend has it that during a great flood, canoes were tied to the mountaintop which broke off leaving only the two peaks, and the canoes and people in them floated to where Seattle is located.

== Climate ==
Based on the Köppen climate classification, Unicorn Peak is located in the marine west coast climate zone of western North America. Weather fronts originating in the Pacific Ocean travel northeast toward the Olympic Mountains. As fronts approach, they are forced upward by the peaks (orographic lift), causing them to drop their moisture in the form of rain or snow. As a result, the Olympics experience high precipitation, especially during the winter months in the form of snowfall. Because of maritime influence, snow tends to be wet and heavy, resulting in avalanche danger. During winter months weather is usually cloudy, but due to high pressure systems over the Pacific Ocean that intensify during summer months, there is often little or no cloud cover during the summer. The months of May through September offer the most favorable weather for viewing or climbing this peak.

== Geology ==
The Olympic Mountains are composed of obducted clastic wedge material and oceanic crust, primarily Eocene sandstone, turbidite, and basaltic oceanic crust. The mountains were sculpted during the Pleistocene era by erosion and glaciers advancing and retreating multiple times.

== See also ==
- Olympic Mountains
- Geology of the Pacific Northwest

== Gallery ==
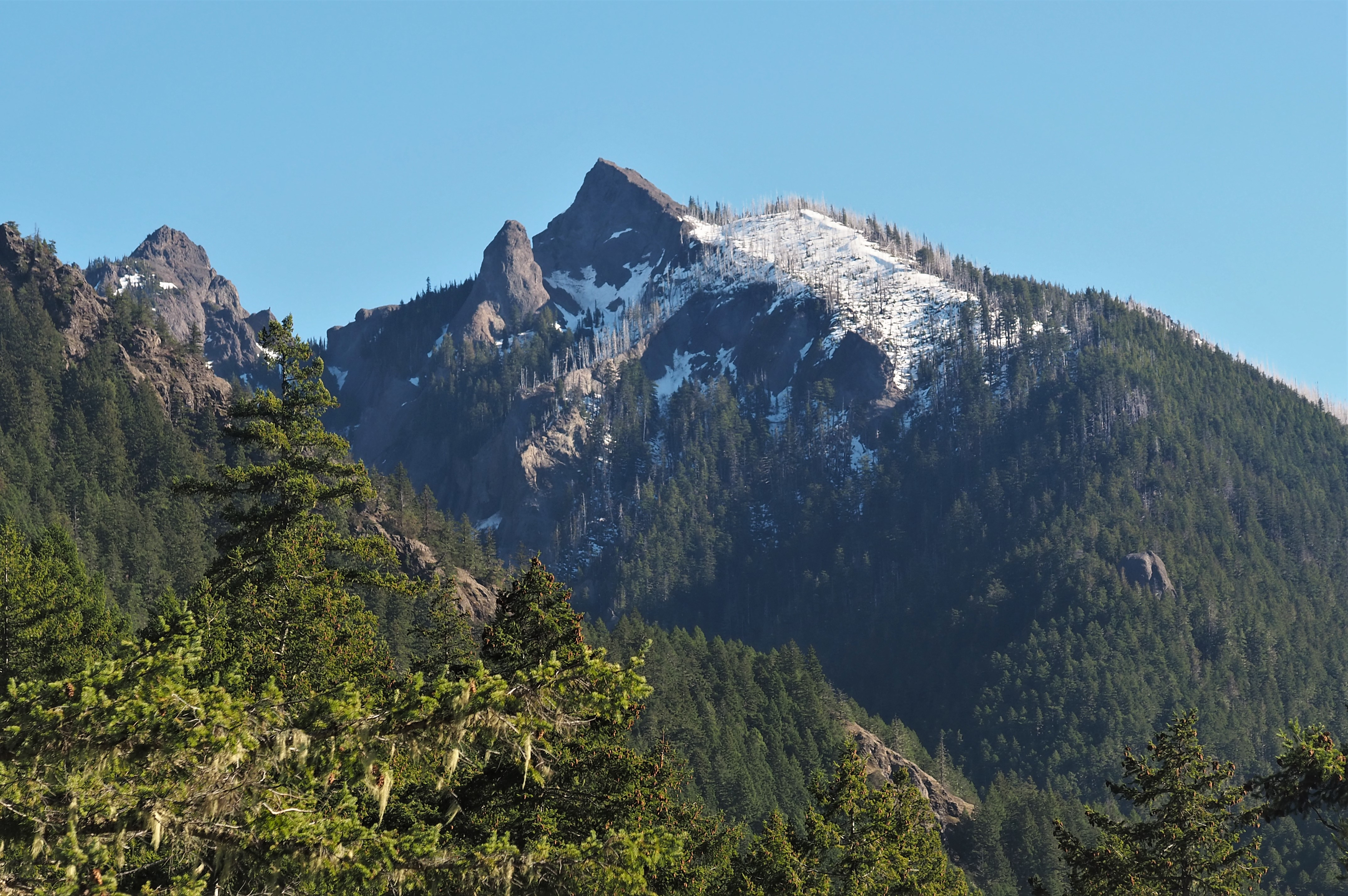
West aspect of Unicorn Peak seen from Elwha Valley.

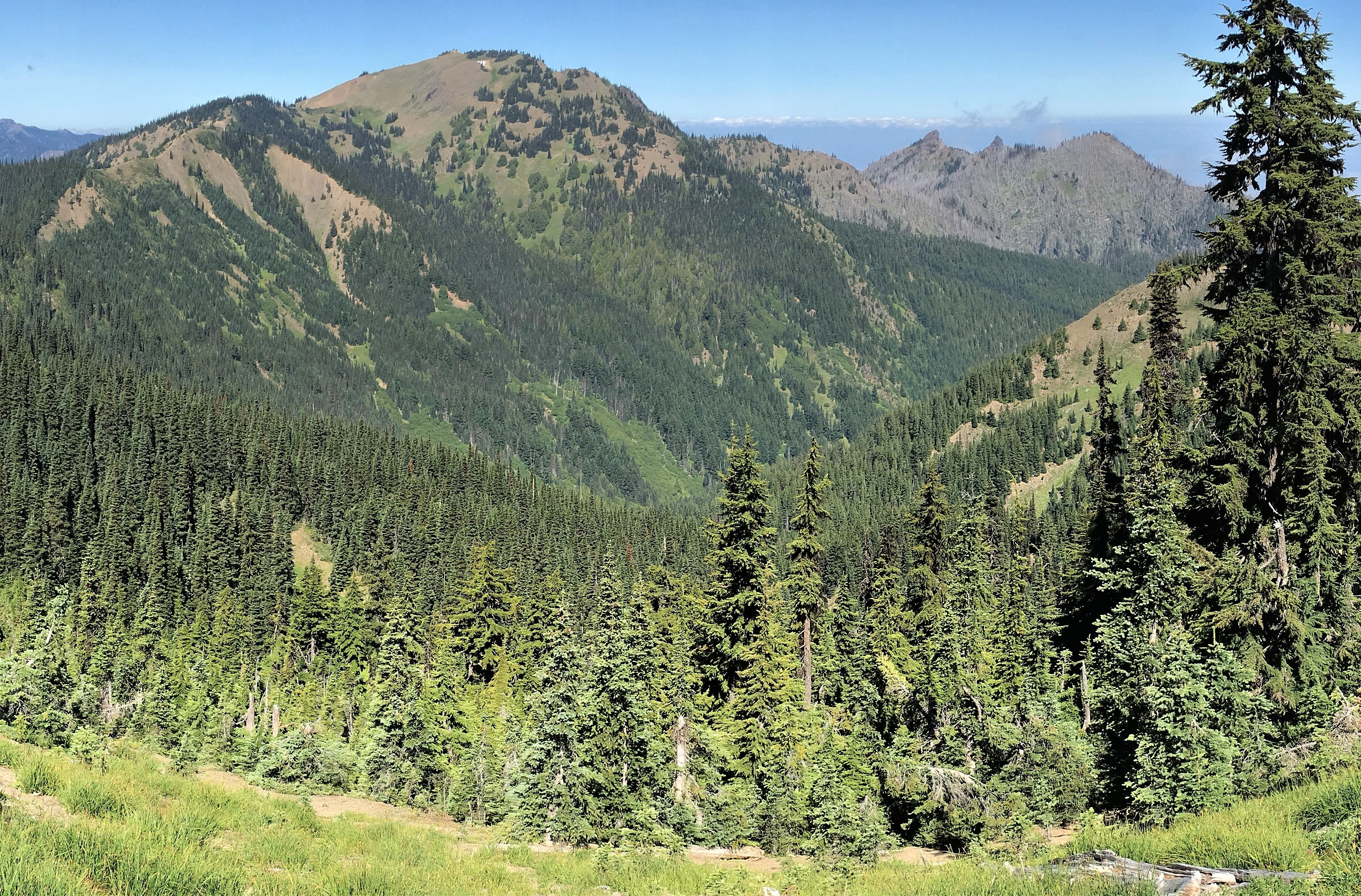
Hurricane Hill (left) and Unicorn Peak (right) seen from Hurricane Ridge.

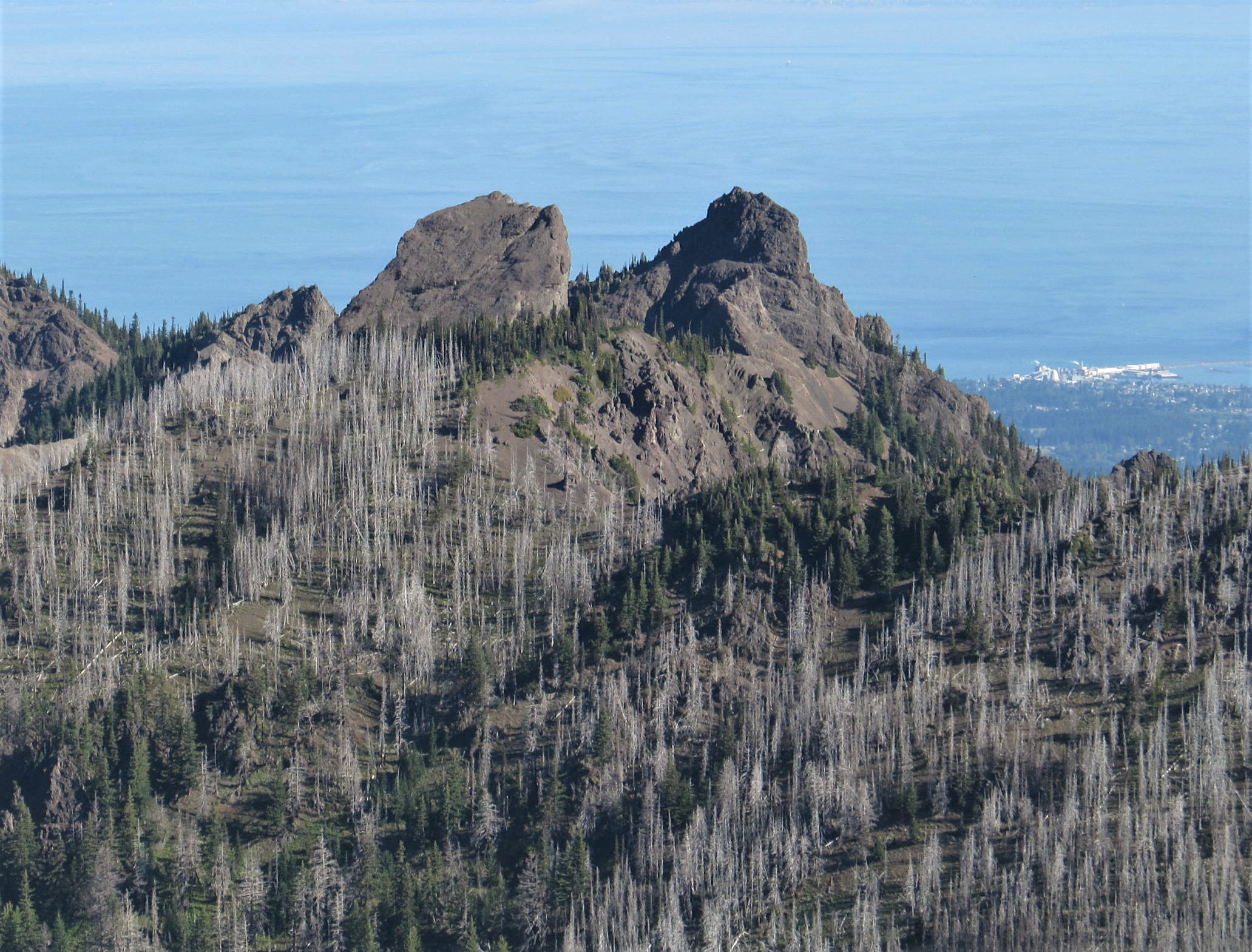
Unicorn Peak (left) and Unicorn Horn (right) seen from Hurricane Hill,
with Port Angeles and Strait of Juan de Fuca in the distance.

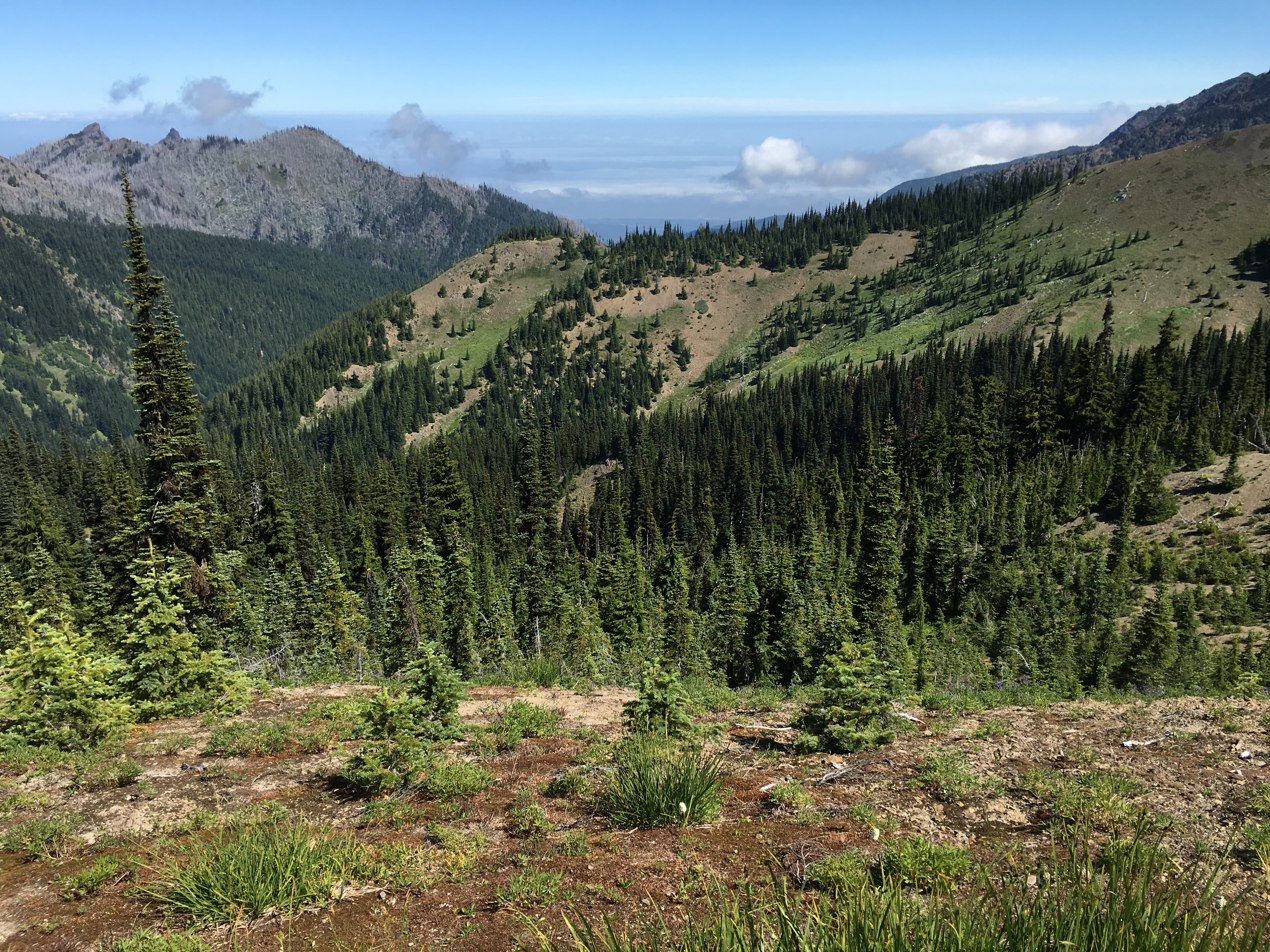
Unicorn Peak (upper left) from Hurricane Ridge

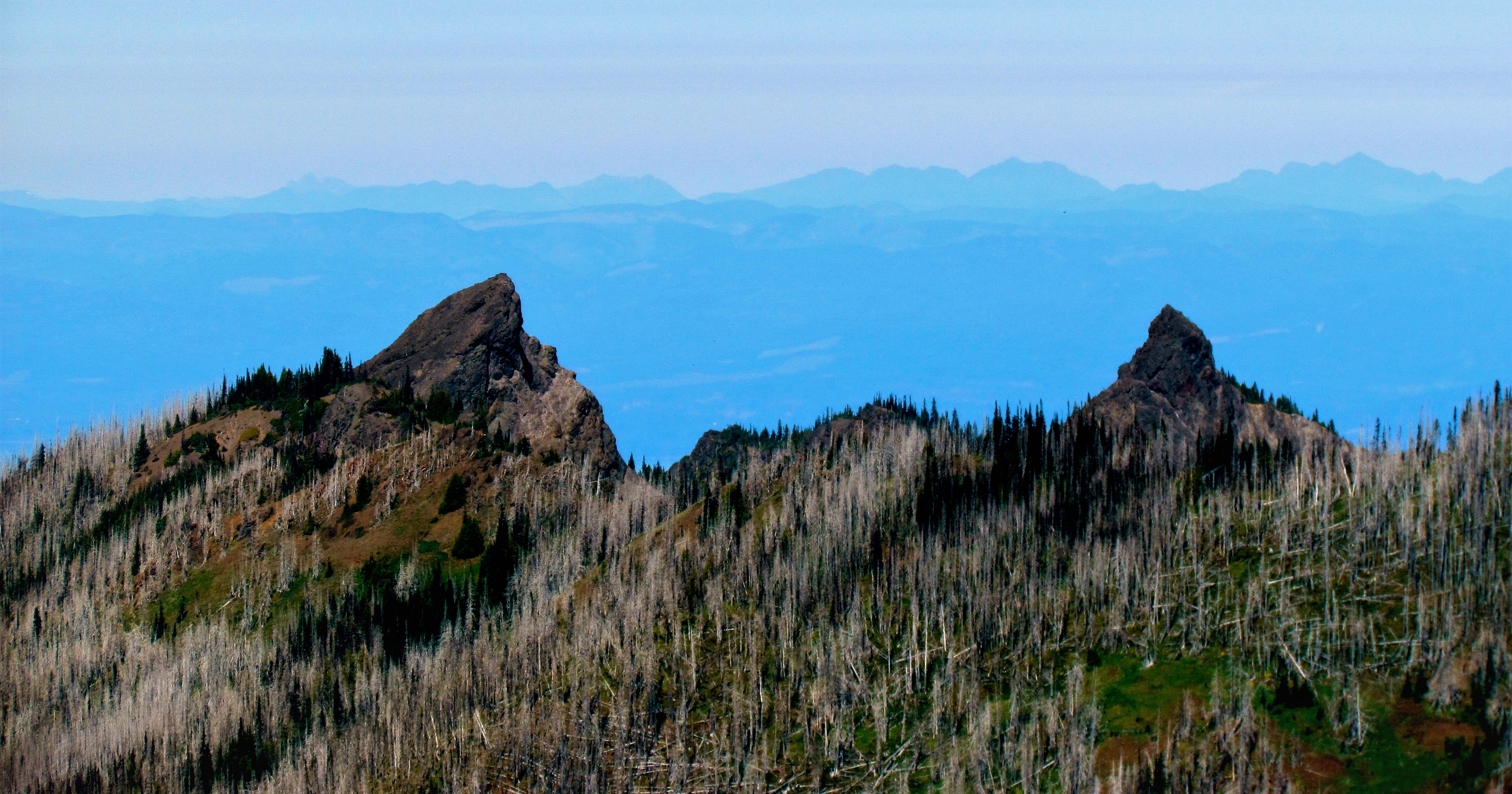
Unicorn Peak (left) and Unicorn Horn (right)

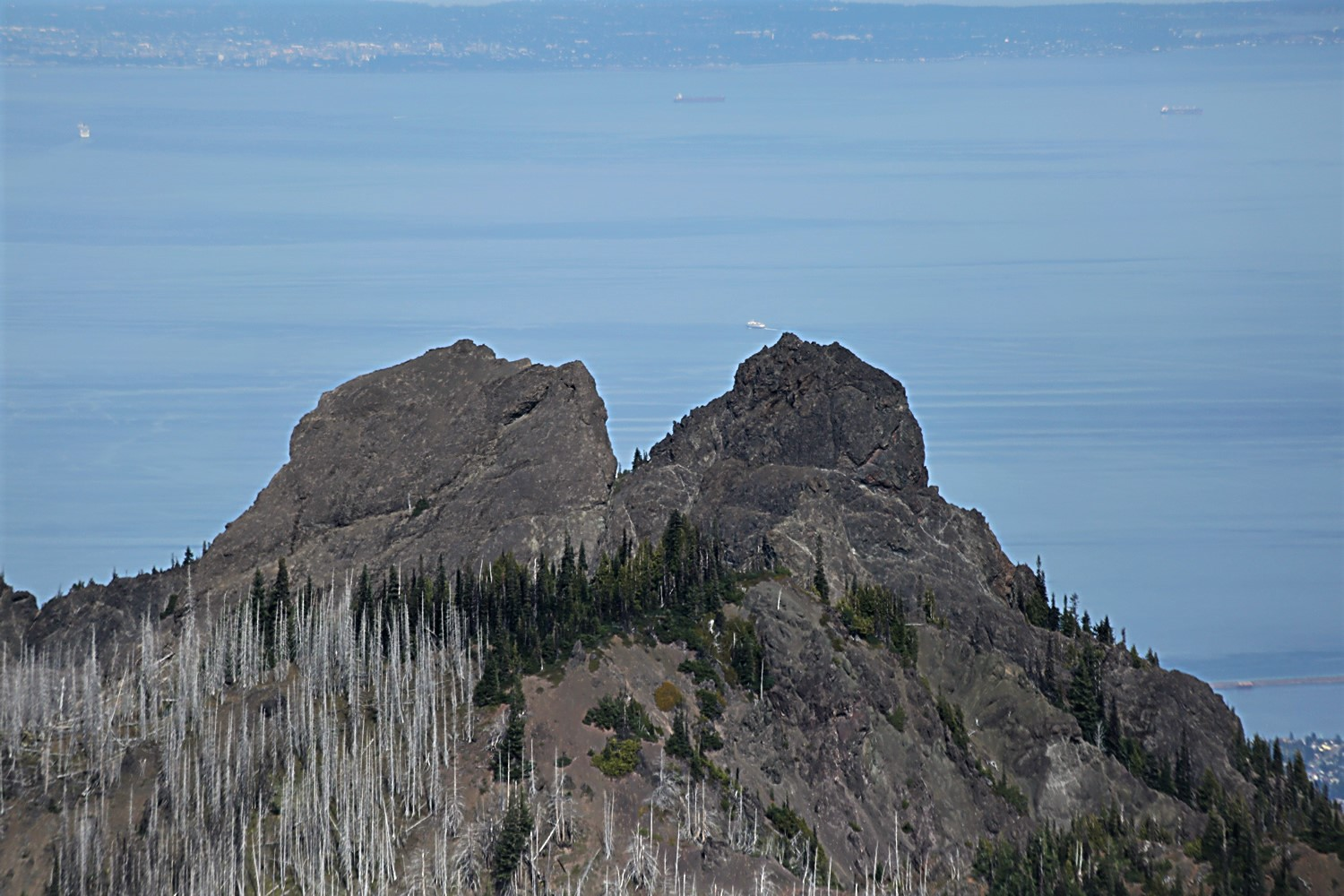
Unicorn Peak seen from Hurricane Hill,
with Strait of Juan de Fuca in the distance.

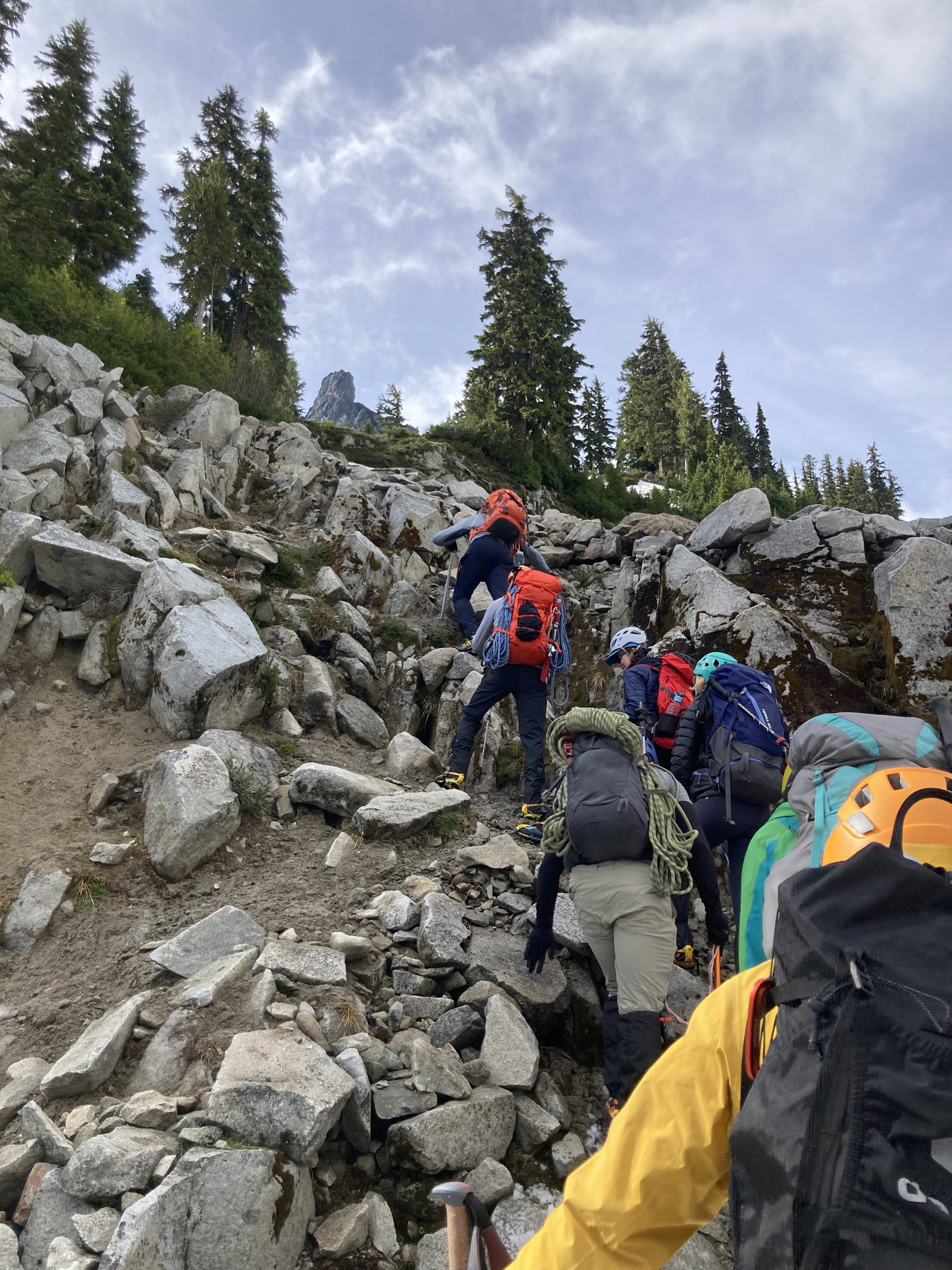
Unicorn Peak visible above climbers

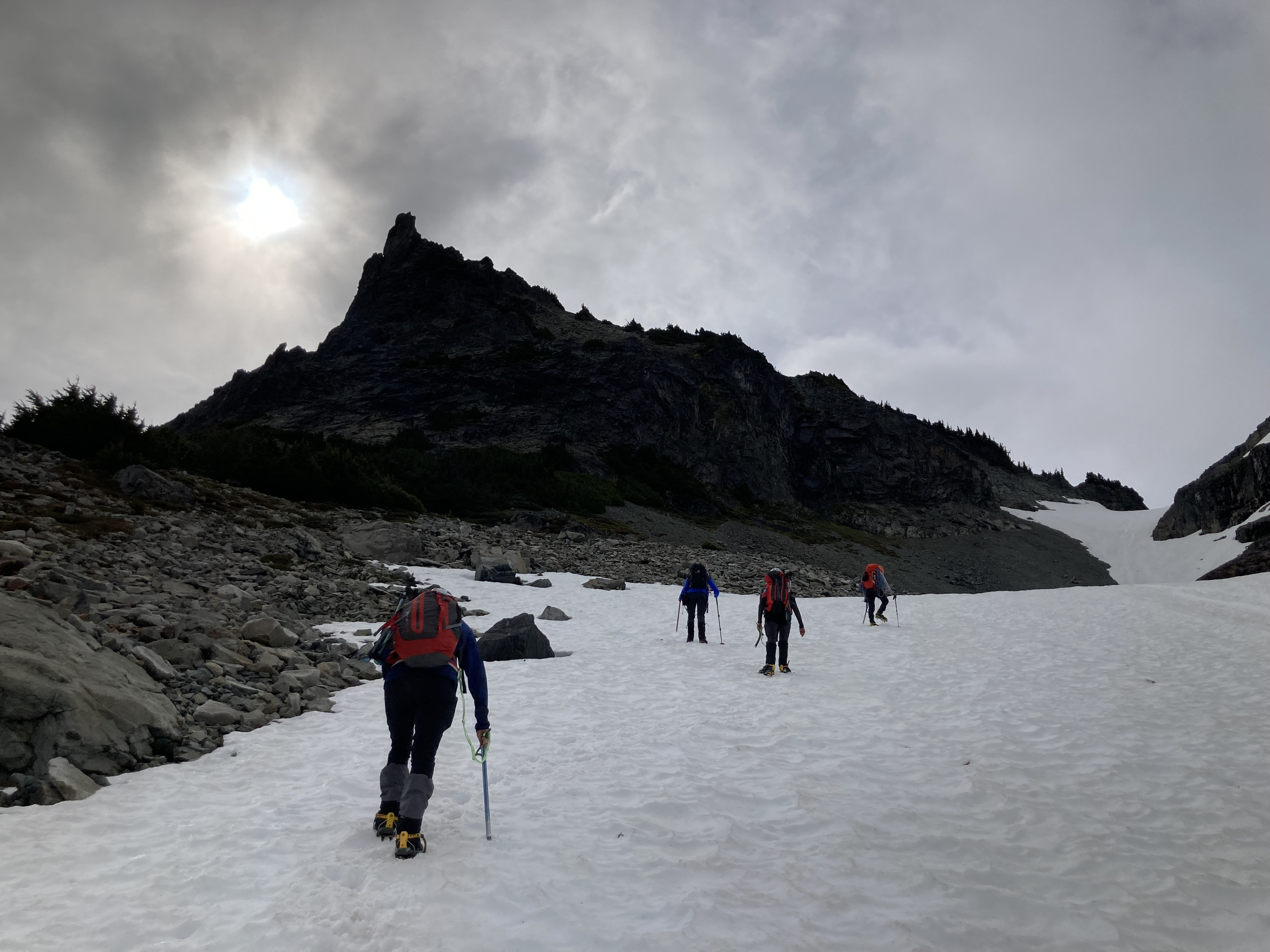
Mountaineers climb towards Unicorn Peak

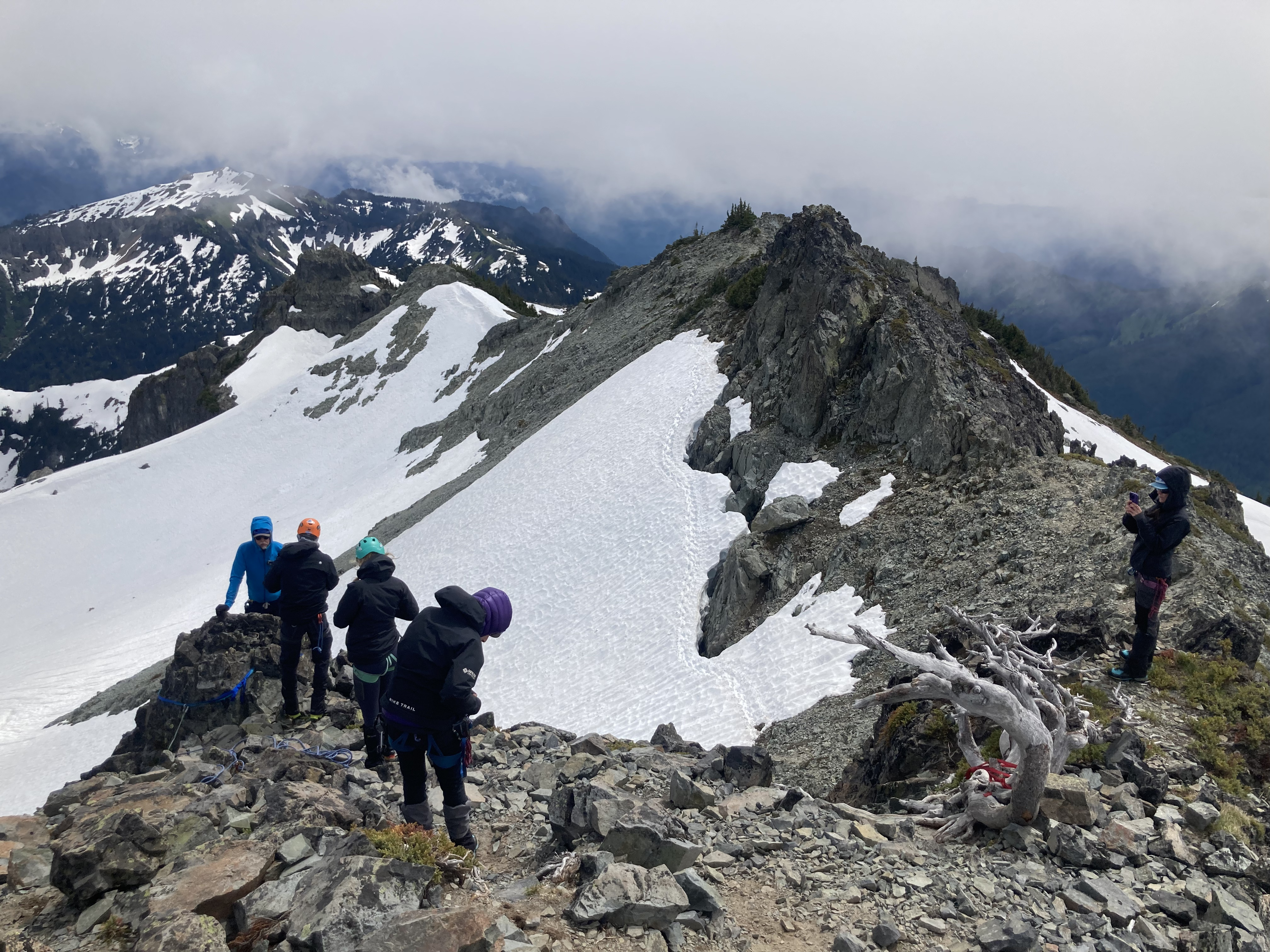
Mazamas mountaineering group on top of Unicorn Peak

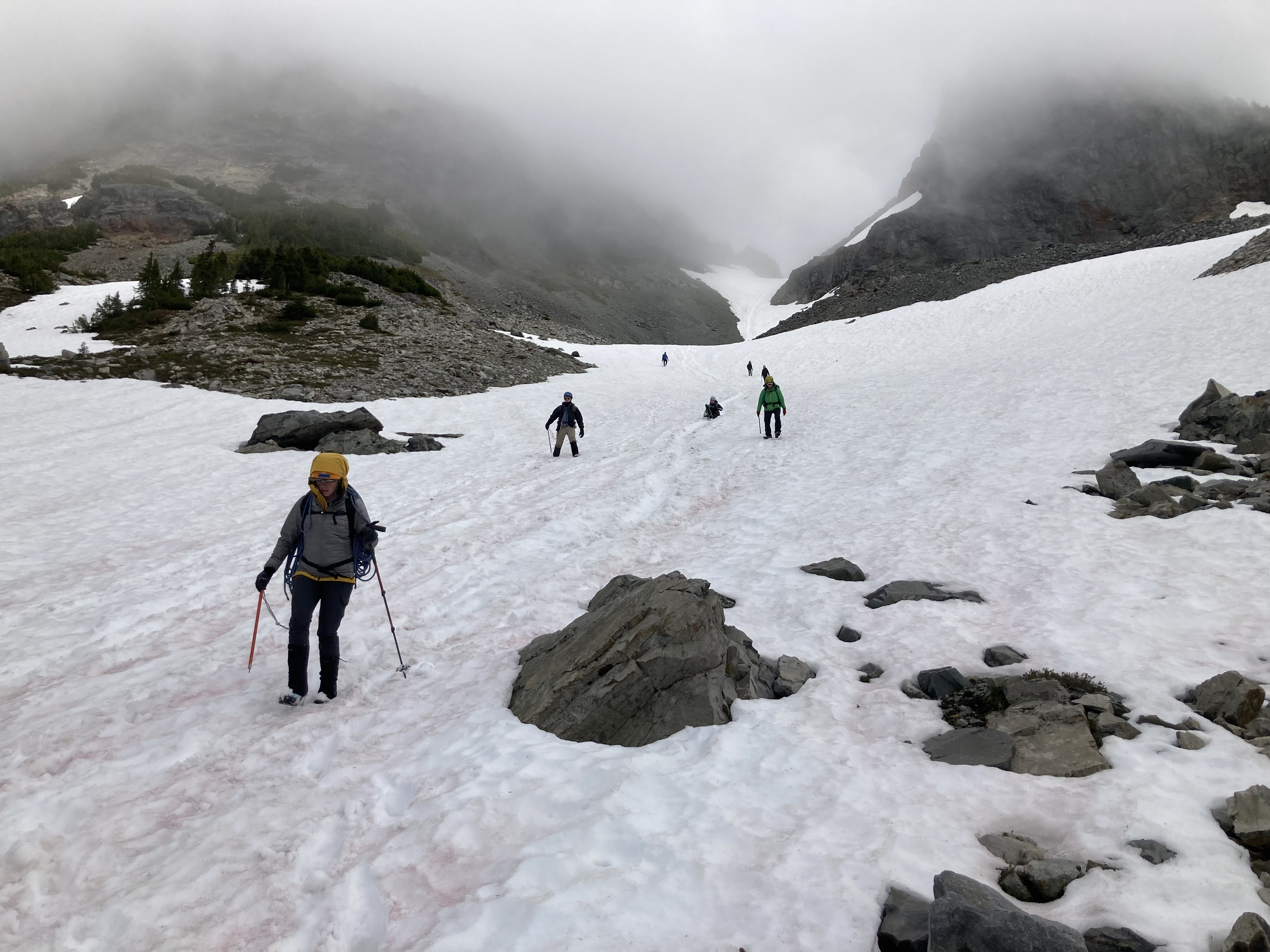
Mountaineers descending Unicorn Peak
