= Pūtangirua Pinnacles =

Geological formation of New Zealand'

Pūtangirua Pinnacles The Pinnacles
- Cliff
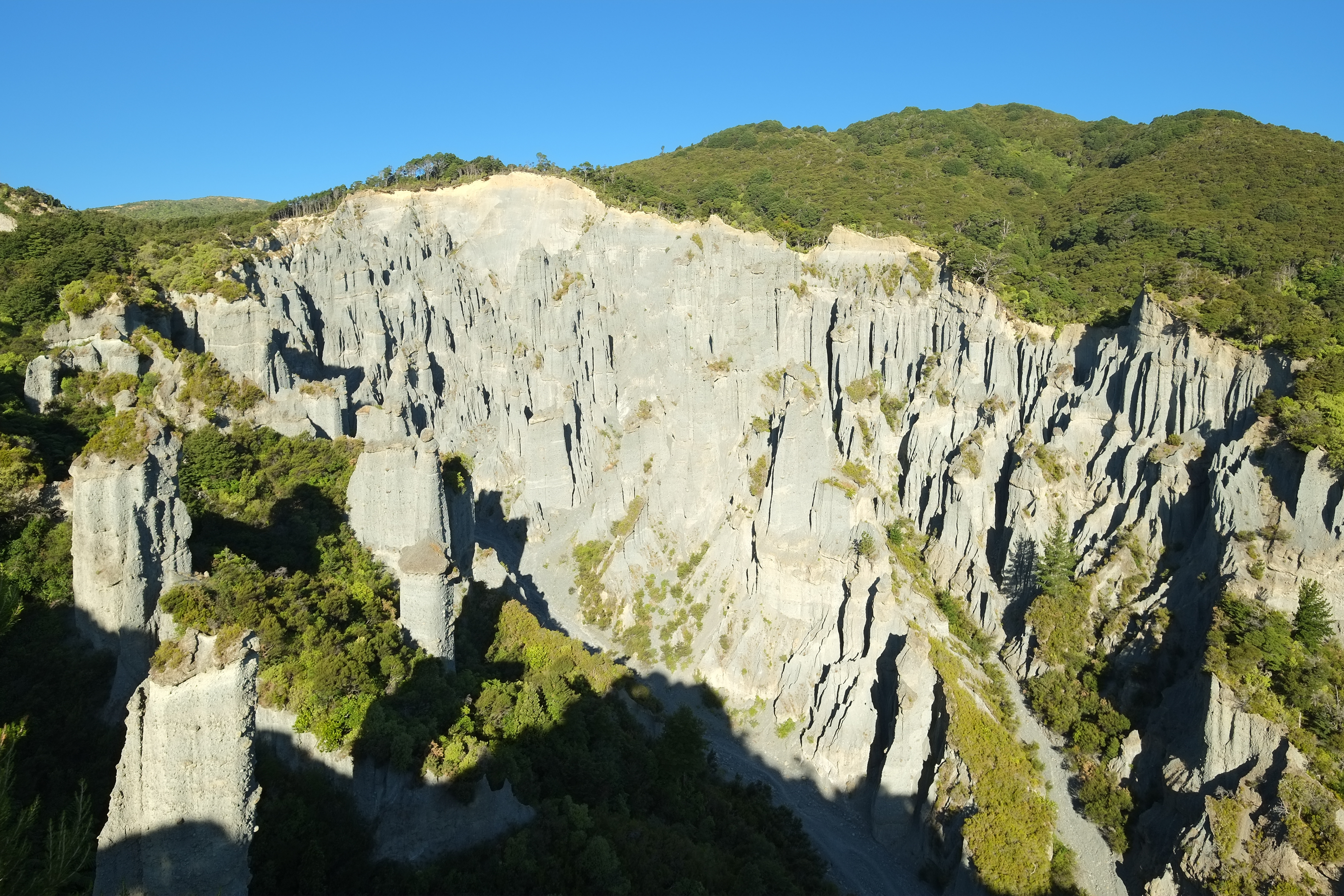
- Pūtangirua Pinnacles

- Location within New Zealand
- Coordinates: 41.4467°S 175.2467°E
- Location: Putangirua Pinnacles Scenic Reserve
- Etymology: From Māori
- Defining authority: New Zealand Geographic Board

The Pūtangirua Pinnacles (also known colloquially simply as the Pinnacles) are a geological formation and one of New Zealand's best examples of badlands erosion. They consist of a large number of earth pillars or hoodoos located at the head of a valley in the Aorangi Ranges, on the North Island of New Zealand, in the Wellington region.

In December 2019, the approved official geographic name of the rocks was gazetted as "Pūtangirua Pinnacles".

== Geology ==
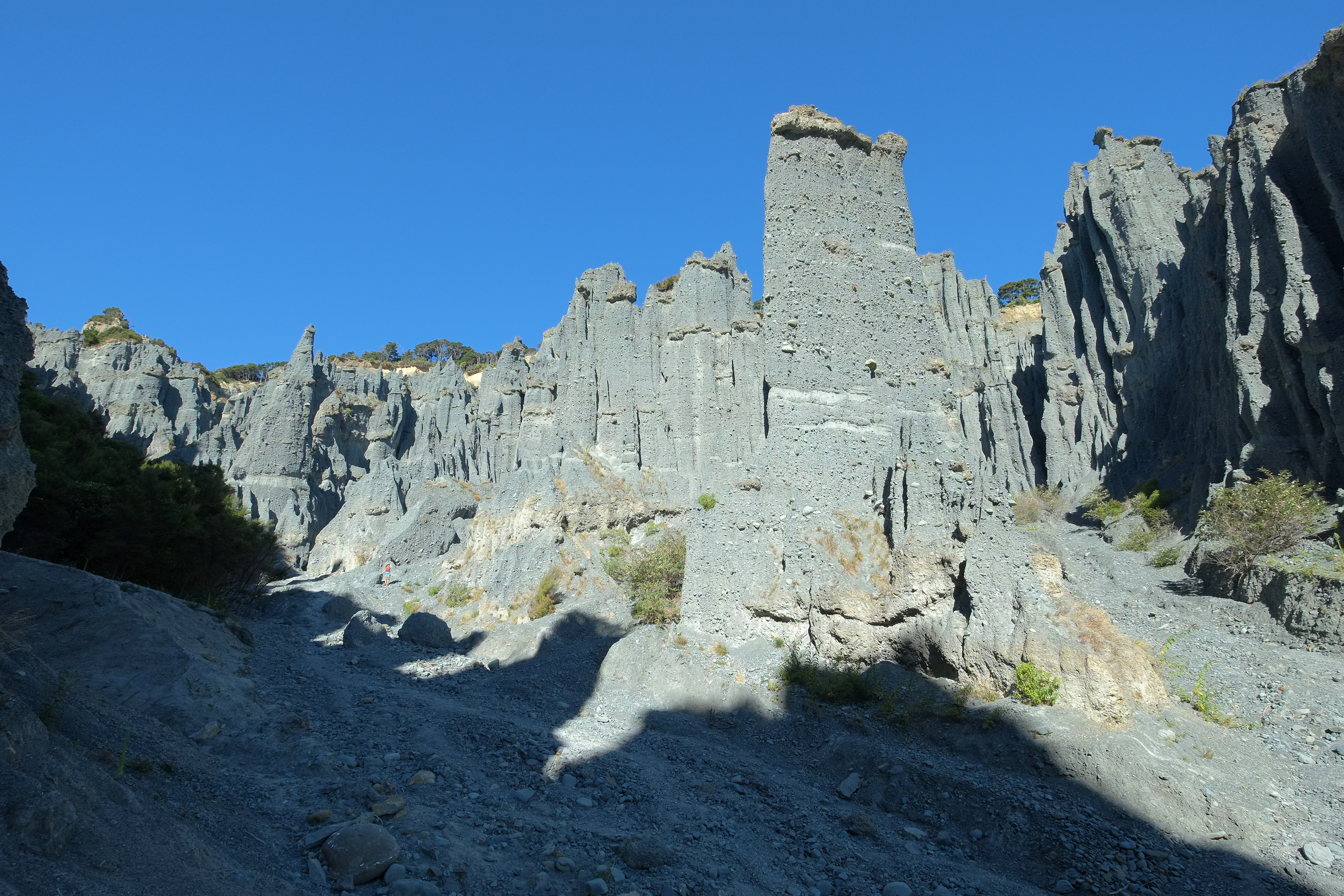
Gorge below the pinnacles

Some 7 to 9 million years ago when sea levels were much higher, the Aorangi ranges were an island. As this landmass was eroded over time, large alluvial fans formed on its southern shores. Within a few million years however, sea levels rose again and the island was submerged. Since the ice ages, sea levels have receded, and the old alluvial fans have been exposed to the erosive forces of wind and water which have weathered away the conglomerate. In some places this conglomerate is protected from erosion by a cap of cemented silt or rock; this has resulted in the formation of spectacular pinnacles, many of which have prominent fluting caused by rainwater running down their sides during major storms. It is not known exactly how long the pinnacles have been forming but they are thought to be less than 125,000 years old; major erosion probably began 7,000 years ago and accelerated in the last 1,000 years with the deforestation of the area. The current erosion rate is approximately 1 cm per year.

== In popular culture ==
Part of the Paths of the Dead sequence in the film The Lord of the Rings: The Return of the King was filmed on location here, as was the opening sequence of Braindead.
