= The Pinnacles (Gulf of Mexico) =

- Location within Gulf of Mexico

Location
- Location: Gulf of Mexico
- Coordinates: 29.38°N 87.95°W
- Country: United States

Geology
- Type: platform reef

The Pinnacles is a rocky prominence on the continental shelf of the Gulf Coast of the United States approximately 300 feet (91 m) deep and located about 70 miles (110 km) off the coasts of Mississippi and Alabama which contains a platform reef.

== Flora and fauna ==
The Pinnacles reefs consist of a lush fauna of hard, soft and, black corals, fixed sea lilies and sponges. The reef creates a living habitat for a well-developed and diverse fish culture. Snappers and groupers spawn here. Typical Caribbean reef fishes and Carolinian shelf fishes, along with epipelagic fishes, and a few deep-sea fishes populate the reef.

The Pinnacles reefs are currently too deep for reef-building corals to grow, and scientists suggest that these reefs were formed during low sea levels associated with the last ice age.

== Environmental concerns ==
Coral damage at the Pinnacles from the BP Deepwater Horizon oil spill is the subject of a new study (2015) conducted by Florida State University and NOAA. The study revealed sick and dying corals due to oil that was sprayed with chemical dispersants which caused it to settle over the reefs. The study also determined a tropical storm that passed over the area during summer 2010 churned up the sea and caused oil to reach the corals.

A 2005 National Academy of Sciences report showed that oil mixed with dispersants damaged certain corals' reproduction and deformed their larvae. The study concluded the federal government needed to study more before using massive amounts of dispersants.

The Pinnacles is one of nine coral banks and hard-bottom areas stretching from Texas to Florida that the National Oceanic and Atmospheric Administration tried in 2008 to get designated a marine sanctuary called Islands in the Stream. Such designation would have restricted fishing and oil drilling around the identified reef "islands", but the plan was put on hold after vehement objections from lawmakers, fishermen and the oil industry.
