= Wahpenayo Peak =

Mountain in Washington (state), United States

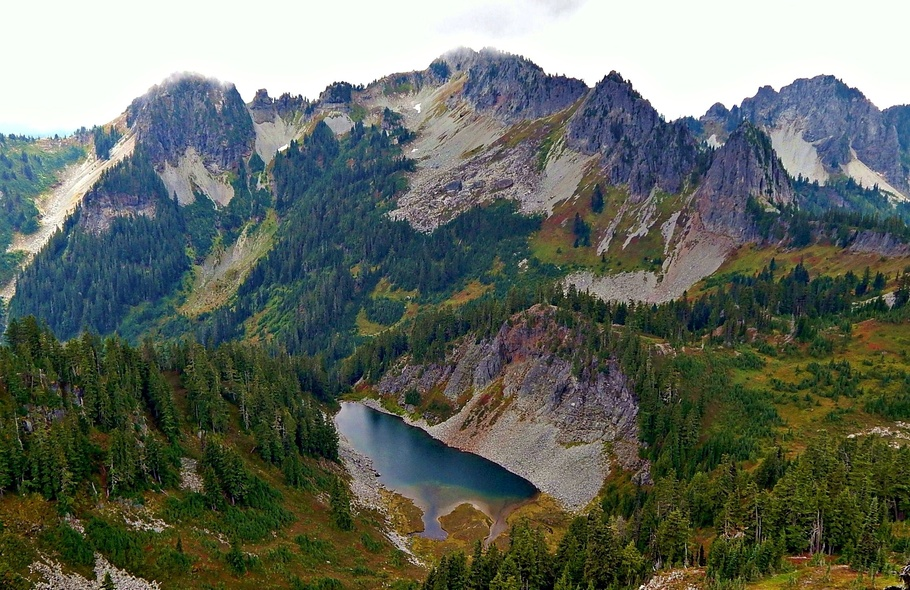
- Wahpenayo Peak (centered) seen from Denman Peak with Cliff Lake and Chutla Peak to far right

Highest point
- Elevation: 6,231 ft (1,899 m)
- Prominence: 791 ft (241 m)
- Parent peak: Plummer Peak (6,374 ft)
- Isolation: 1.37 mi (2.20 km)
- Coordinates: 46°44′49″N 121°46′01″W

Geography
- Location within Washington (state) Location within the United States
- Country: United States
- State: Washington
- County: Lewis
- Protected area: Mount Rainier National Park
- Parent range: Cascades
- Topo map: USGS Wahpenayo Peak

Climbing
- Easiest route: Scrambling class 3

Wahpenayo Peak is a 6,231-foot (1,899-metre) mountain summit in Lewis County of Washington state, United States. It is part of the Tatoosh Range which is a sub-range of the Cascade Range. It is located south of Mount Rainier within Mount Rainier National Park. The mountain is named for Wahpenayo, a native American chief who was the father-in-law of Indian Henry. Precipitation runoff on the south and east side of the peak drains into tributaries of the Cowlitz River, whereas the north side drains into tributaries of the Nisqually River.

== Climate ==
Wahpenayo Peak is located in the marine west coast climate zone of western North America. Most weather fronts originating in the Pacific Ocean travel northeast toward the Cascade Mountains. As fronts approach, they are forced upward by the peaks of the Cascade Range (orographic lift), causing them to drop their moisture in the form of rain or snow onto the Cascades. As a result, the west side of the Cascades experiences high precipitation, especially during the winter months in the form of snowfall. Because of maritime influence, snow tends to be wet and heavy, resulting in avalanche danger. During winter months, weather is usually cloudy, but due to high pressure systems over the Pacific Ocean that intensify during summer months, there is often little or no cloud cover during the summer. Due to its temperate climate and proximity to the Pacific Ocean, areas west of the Cascade Crest very rarely experience temperatures below 0 °F (−18 °C) or above 80 °F (27 °C).

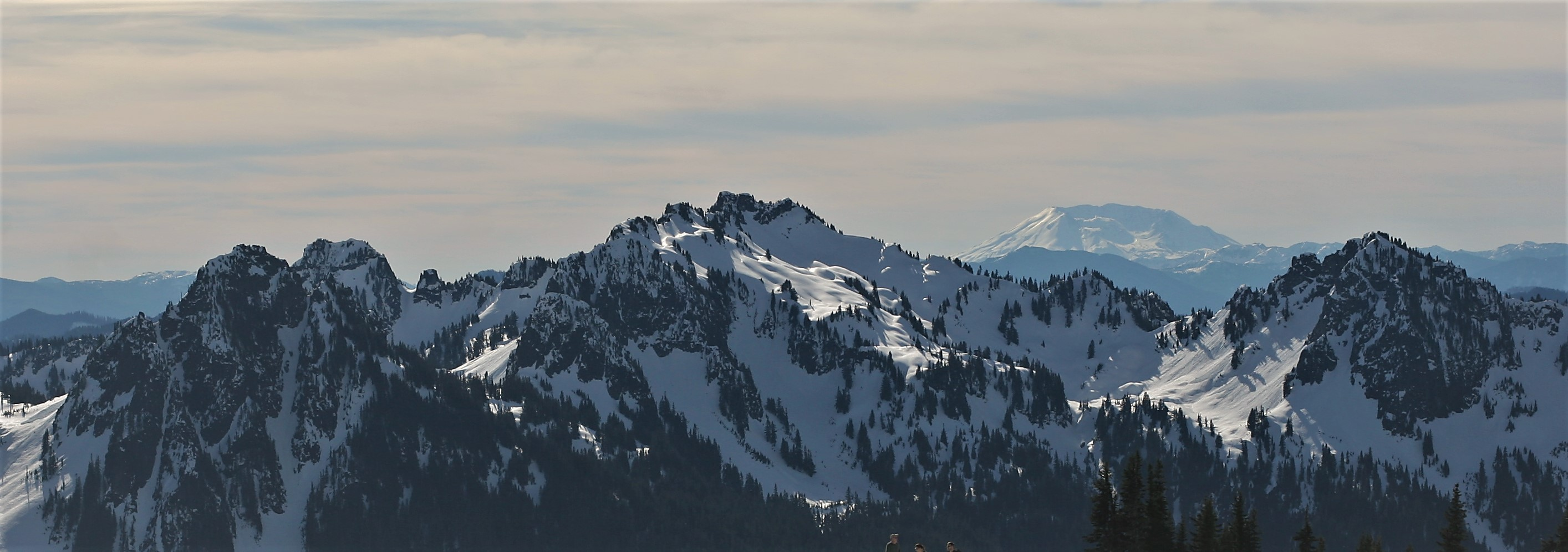
Left to rightː Lane Peak, Wahpenayo Peak (centered), Mount St. Helens, and Chutla Peak in winter.

== See also ==
- Geology of the Pacific Northwest
- Geography of Washington (state)
- List of geographic features in Lewis County, Washington
