= Denman Peak =

Mountain in Washington (state), United States

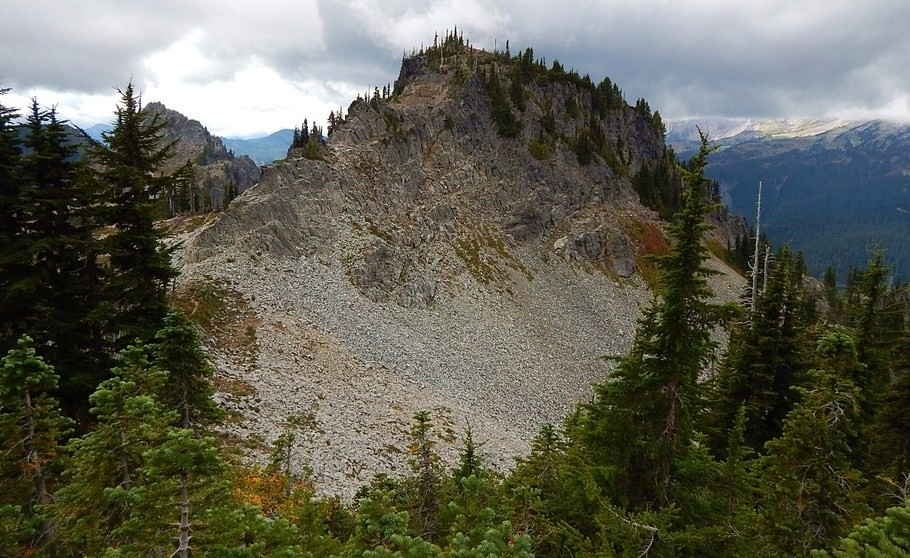
- Southeast aspect

Highest point
- Elevation: 6,006 ft (1,831 m)
- Prominence: 206 ft (63 m)
- Parent peak: Plummer Peak
- Isolation: 0.33 mi (0.53 km)
- Coordinates: 46°45′26″N 121°44′36″W

Geography
- Location within Washington (state) Location within the United States
- Country: United States
- State: Washington
- County: Lewis
- Protected area: Mount Rainier National Park
- Parent range: Cascades
- Topo map: USGS Mount Rainier East

Climbing
- Easiest route: Scrambling class 3

Denman Peak is a small 6,006 ft summit in the Tatoosh Range which is a sub-range of the Cascade Range. It's located south of Mount Rainier within Mount Rainier National Park. Denman Peak is situated east of Lane Peak and west of Pinnacle Peak.

Formerly known as That Peak, in 1931 The Mountaineers named it for their lawyer, Asahel Holmes Denman of Tacoma, following twenty years of work in the interests of the organization.

Precipitation runoff on the south side of the peak drains into tributaries of the Cowlitz River, whereas the north side drains into tributaries of the Nisqually River.

== Climate ==
Denman Peak is located in the marine west coast climate zone of western North America. Most weather fronts originating in the Pacific Ocean travel northeast toward the Cascade Mountains. As fronts approach, they are forced upward by the peaks of the Cascade Range (orographic lift), causing them to drop their moisture in the form of rain or snow onto the Cascades. As a result, the west side of the Cascades experiences high precipitation, especially during the winter months in the form of snowfall. Because of maritime influence, snow tends to be wet and heavy, resulting in avalanche danger. During winter months, weather is usually cloudy, but due to high pressure systems over the Pacific Ocean that intensify during summer months, there is often little or no cloud cover during the summer.

== Climbing ==
The Pinnacle Saddle Trailhead is located on the south side of the Stevens Canyon Road at Reflection Lakes. The well maintained Pinnacle Saddle Trail climbs 1,050 feet to the saddle in 1.25 mile length. From the saddle between Pinnacle and Plummer Peak, a climber's path traverses the north slope of Plummer Peak. Reaching the summit of Denman Peak is short class 2-3 scrambling.

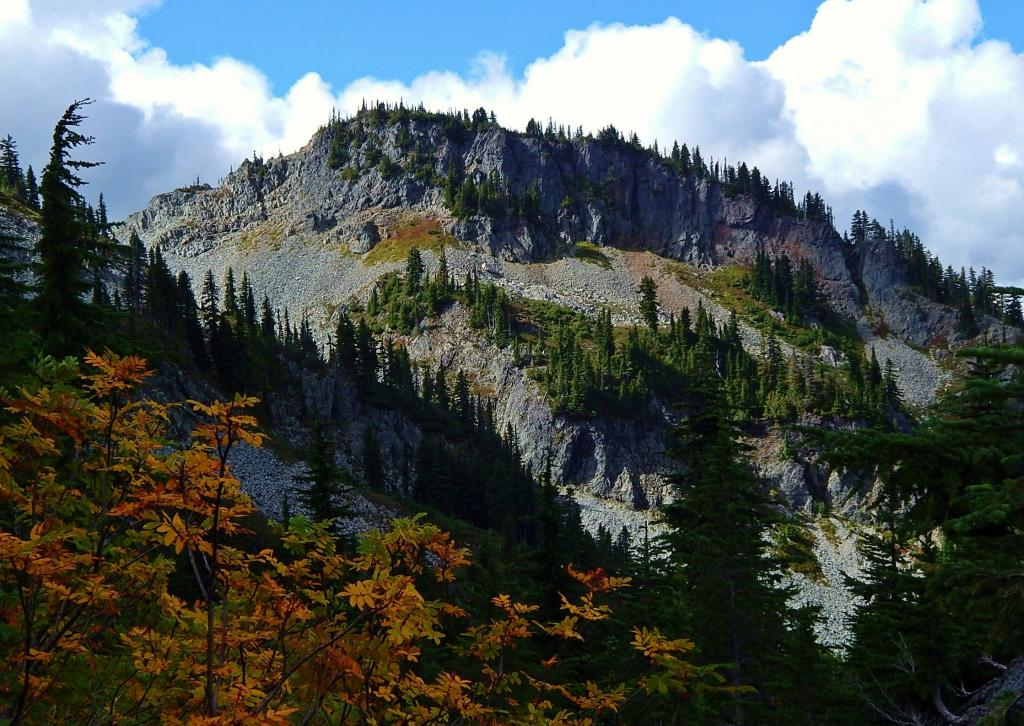
Denman Peak seen from Pinnacle Saddle Trail

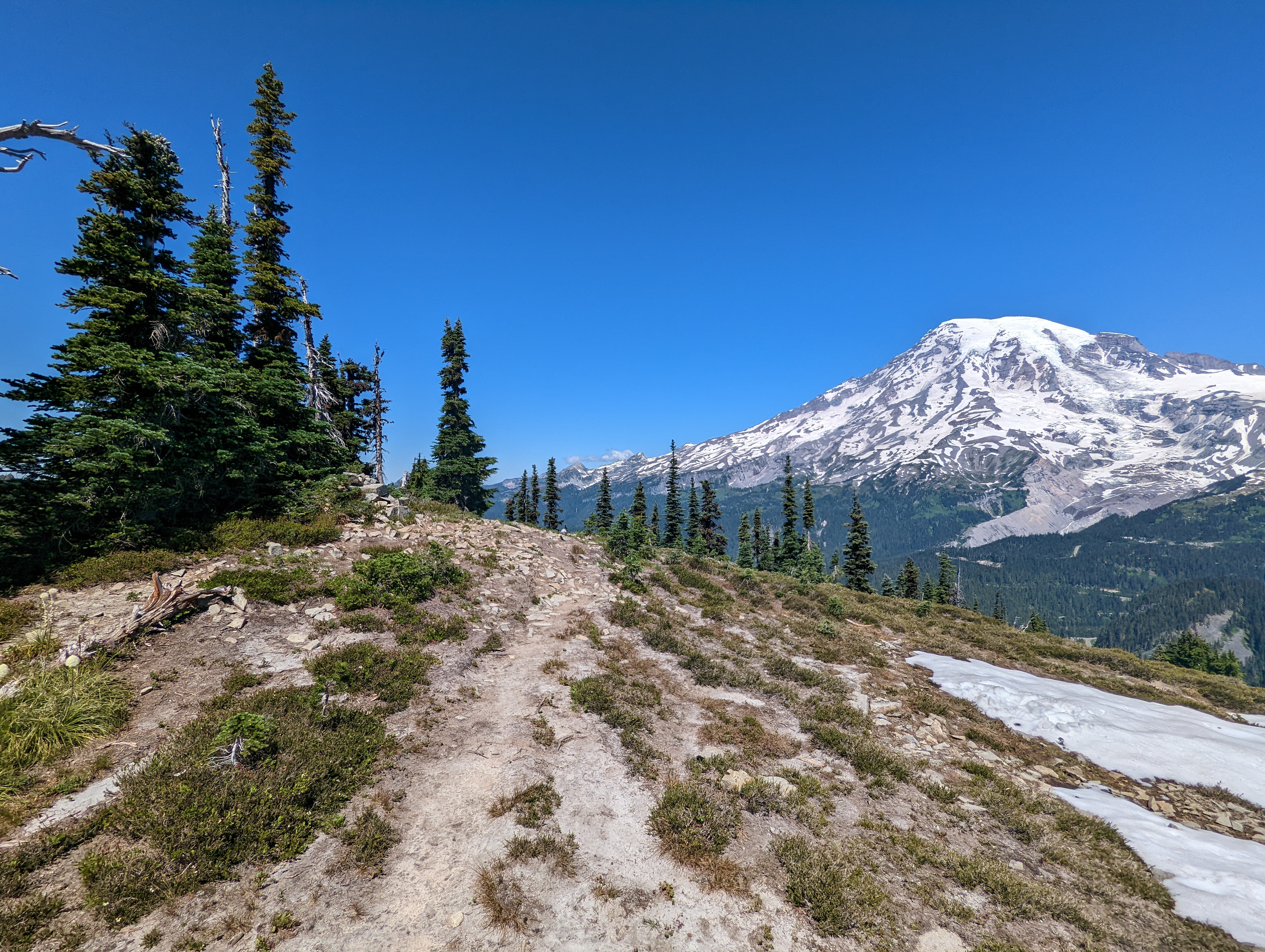
Summit of Denman Peak with Mt. Rainier in the background

== See also ==
- List of geographic features in Lewis County, Washington
