= Thea Foss =

American tugboat company founder

Thea Christiansen Foss (8 June 1858 – 7 June 1927) was the founder of Foss Maritime, the largest tugboat company in the western United States. She was the real-life person on which the fictional character "Tugboat Annie" (originally portrayed on film in 1933 by Marie Dressler) may have been very loosely based.

== Biography ==
Thea Christiansen was born on June 8, 1858, in the village of Eidsberg, Østfold, Norway. She moved to Kristiania (Oslo from 1926) when she was 14 where she met her sister's brother-in-law, Andreas Olsen, a ship's carpenter. Olsen immigrated to America to earn money to pay for Thea's passage. She arrived in St. Paul, Minnesota in 1881 where the two were married. They lived in St. Paul for eight years and had four children. Andreas changed his first name to Andrew and their last name to Fossen to distinguish themselves from the many other Olesons in the area. Fossen, meaning waterfall, was later shortened to Foss. Andrew Fossen moved to Tacoma, Washington in 1888, what was then known as Washington Territory. Thea and their children joined him in the spring of 1889, after the birth of their third child.Andrew built a float house on the Tacoma waterfront for the family to settle.

Thea Foss launched the future tugboat firm on the Tacoma waterfront in the summer of 1889. She started the Foss Launch Company, when she began fixing up rowboats to sell. Thea started with one and sold it for $5; then she was able to buy another, and continue to do so. Andrew ended up building rowboats and their home became Foss Boathouse. The business grew, expanding into other areas such as towing, and hauling lumber. The company eventually became the Seattle-based Foss Maritime Company.

Thea Foss died in Tacoma on the day before her 69th birthday.

== Legacy ==
- The Thea Foss Waterway, a 1.5-mile (2.4-kilometre) mile inlet in Tacoma's industrial area, and connected to Puget Sound, is named after Foss.
- USS Amber (PYc-6), which had served as a patrol vessel in World War II, was renamed the Thea Foss after being purchased by Foss Marine Company.
- The power yacht now known as Mitlite was originally launched in 1933 as the Thea Foss; it appears to have been the only yacht ever built by Foss Tug. During World War II, it was conscripted by the U.S. Navy for use as a Barrage Balloon Tender, J2036.
- Thea Foss Lodge of the Daughters of Norway was instituted on 29 May 2004. Lodge #45 meets in Chimacum, Washington.
- Foss Peak, a 6524-foot mountain summit in the Tatoosh Range of Mount Rainier National Park
- In 1989, Thea Foss was inducted into the Washington State Centennial Hall of Honor.

== Other sources ==
- Skalley, Michael Foss: Ninety years of towboating (1981) ISBN 0-87564-224-1
