= Tatoosh Peak =

Mountain in Washington (state), United States

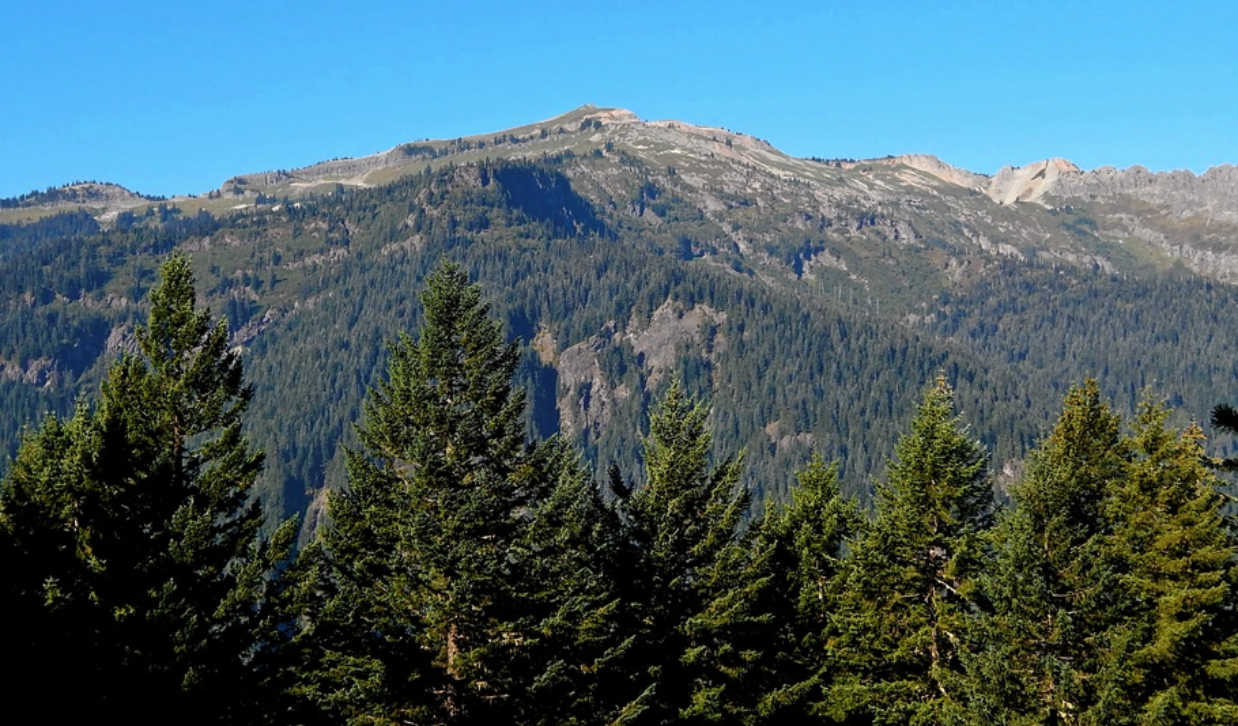
- East aspect

Highest point
- Elevation: 6,310 ft (1,923 m)
- Prominence: 950 ft (290 m)
- Parent peak: Unicorn Peak
- Isolation: 2.81 mi (4.52 km)
- Coordinates: 46°42′22″N 121°39′53″W

Geography
- Location within Washington (state) Location within the United States
- Country: United States
- State: Washington
- County: Lewis
- Protected area: Tatoosh Wilderness
- Parent range: Cascades
- Topo map: USGS Tatoosh Lakes

Climbing
- Easiest route: Hiking

Tatoosh Peak is a 6,310-foot (1,923-metre) mountain summit in Lewis County of Washington state. It is part of the Tatoosh Range which is a subrange of the Cascade Range. It is the highest point in the Tatoosh Wilderness, a protected area which is managed by Gifford Pinchot National Forest. The name tatoosh derives from Chinook Jargon which means breast. Precipitation runoff from the peak drains into tributaries of the Cowlitz River.

== Climate ==
Tatoosh Peak is located in the marine west coast climate zone of western North America. Most weather fronts originating in the Pacific Ocean travel northeast toward the Cascade Mountains. As fronts approach, they are forced upward by the peaks of the Cascade Range (orographic lift), causing them to drop their moisture in the form of rain or snow onto the Cascades. As a result, the west side of the Cascades experiences high precipitation, especially during the winter months in the form of snowfall. Because of maritime influence, snow tends to be wet and heavy, resulting in avalanche danger. During winter months, weather is usually cloudy, but due to high pressure systems over the Pacific Ocean that intensify during summer months, there is often little or no cloud cover during the summer. Due to its temperate climate and proximity to the Pacific Ocean, areas west of the Cascade Crest very rarely experience temperatures below 0 °F (−18 °C) or above 80 °F (27 °C).

== History ==
In 1932, a fire lookout was built on Tatoosh Peak. Author Martha Hardy wrote about her experiences keeping watch at the fire lookout in her 1947 book, Tatoosh.

== Hiking ==
Tatoosh Peak is accessible from the south via the Tatoosh Trail (#161). A spur (#161A) of the Tatoosh Trail extends to the location of a former fire lookout that Martha Hardy wrote about, although only the foundations of the lookout building remain.

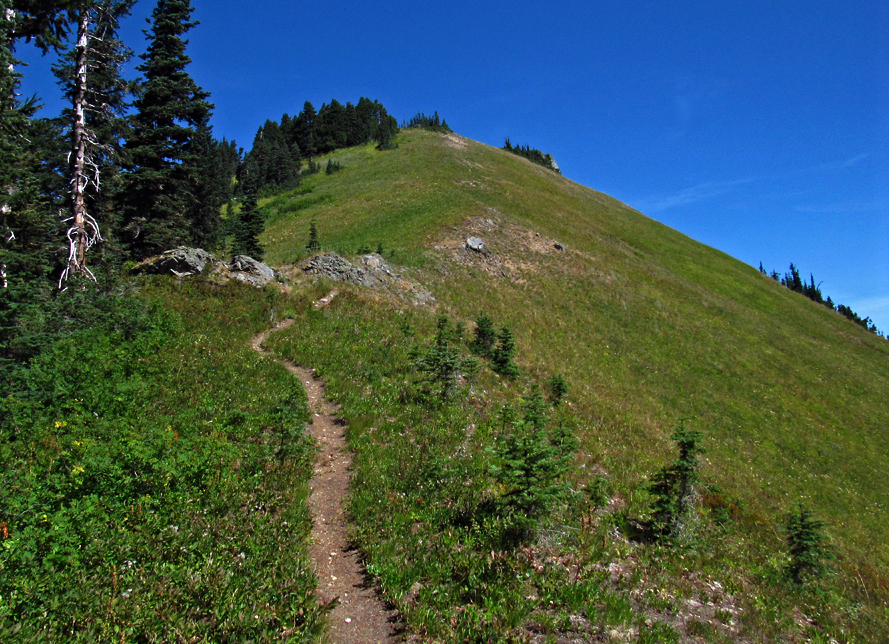
Tatoosh spur trail

== See also ==
- List of geographic features in Lewis County, Washington
