= Eagle Peak (Washington) =

Mountain in Washington (state), United States

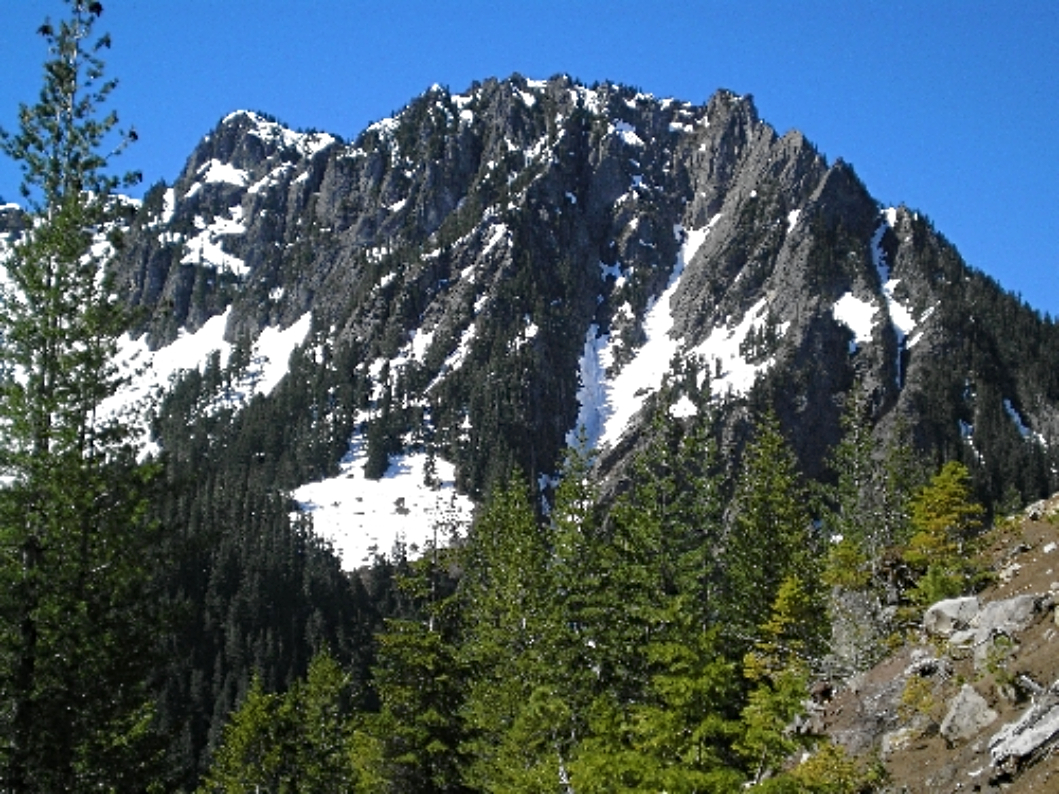
- Eagle Peak seen from Ricksecker Point

Highest point
- Elevation: 5,958 ft (1,816 m)
- Prominence: 238 ft (73 m)
- Parent peak: Chutla Peak (6,020 ft)
- Isolation: 0.28 mi (0.45 km)
- Coordinates: 46°45′21″N 121°46′45″W

Geography
- Location within Washington (state)
- Country: United States
- State: Washington
- County: Lewis
- Protected area: Mount Rainier National Park
- Topo map: USGS Mount Rainier West

Climbing
- Easiest route: Scrambling class 3

Eagle Peak is a 5,958-foot (1,816-metre) mountain summit in Lewis County of Washington state. It is set on the west end of the Tatoosh Range which is a sub-range of the Cascade Range. It is located south of Mount Rainier, within Mount Rainier National Park, and immediately east of Longmire. Eagle Peak was originally known as Simlayshe, a Native American word meaning eagle. George Longmire anglicized the name to Eagle Peak. The four-mile Eagle Peak Trail leads to views of Mount Rainier. The summit of Eagle Peak requires scrambling. Precipitation runoff on the peak drains into the Nisqually River.

== Climate ==
Eagle Peak is located in the marine west coast climate zone of western North America. Most weather fronts originating in the Pacific Ocean travel northeast toward the Cascade Mountains. As fronts approach, they are forced upward by the peaks of the Cascade Range (orographic lift), causing them to drop their moisture in the form of rain or snow onto the Cascades. As a result, the west side of the Cascades experiences high precipitation, especially during the winter months in the form of snowfall. Because of maritime influence, snow tends to be wet and heavy, resulting in avalanche danger. During winter months, weather is usually cloudy, but due to high pressure systems over the Pacific Ocean that intensify during summer months, there is often little or no cloud cover during the summer. The months July through September offer the most favorable weather for viewing or climbing this peak. Due to its temperate climate and proximity to the Pacific Ocean, areas west of the Cascade Crest very rarely experience temperatures below 0 °F (−18 °C) or above 80 °F (27 °C).

== See also ==
- List of geographic features in Lewis County, Washington
