= Martha Hardy =

American educator, author, and oral historian

Martha Hardy (1907-1983) was an American educator, author, ranger, and oral historian, best known for her 1946 memoir Tatoosh, an account of her time as a U.S. Forest Service fire lookout on Tatoosh Peak in Washington's Columbia National Forest (now part of the Gifford Pinchot National Forest), near Mount Rainier. In the 1960s she also recorded an extensive series of interviews with Mary Kiona, a respected elder of the Taytnapam (Upper Cowlitz) people, which are held today at the University of Washington and have been cited in subsequent academic scholarship.

== Fire lookout service ==
In 1943, Hardy, then a Seattle-area schoolteacher, staffed the fire lookout on Tatoosh Peak for the Packwood Ranger District of the U.S. Forest Service, headquartered at Packwood Station, south of Mount Rainier National Park. She lived alone for the summer in a glass-walled lookout cabin at approximately 6,300 feet, watching for wildfires across the surrounding timber. Some local historical accounts describe her as among the first women to serve as a fire lookout for the Packwood district, though sourcing on this point is not conclusive.

== Tatoosh (1946) ==
Hardy's account of her lookout summer, Tatoosh, was published by Macmillan in New York in 1946. The book was reissued in 1980 by Mountaineers Books. It is written in a first-person, informal style and describes both the practical work of fire spotting and the isolation of the posting, along with the surrounding alpine landscape and wildlife. Hardy donated the bound manuscript of the book to the University of Washington Libraries in 1948.

== Oral history recordings of Mary Kiona ==
Between 1964 and 1965, Hardy recorded a series of interviews with Mary Kiona, an elder of the Taytnapam (Upper Cowlitz) people, at Skyo Ranch near Packwood, Washington. Kiona spoke primarily in Sahaptin, with translation assistance during the sessions from her daughter, Minnie Placid, and her granddaughter, Joyce Eyley; portions of the Sahaptin material were later transcribed by James Salem. Scholars of Taidnapam ethnography and language, including a University of Washington study of the Taidnapam and a subsequent oral-history translation and transcription project, have identified Hardy's 1964–65 sessions as the most extensive recorded interviews with Kiona and have cited them directly as source material.

== Archives ==
The Martha Hardy papers are held by University of Washington Libraries Special Collections (Collection No. 0146), comprising the bound 1946 manuscript of Tatoosh and the 1964–1968 Mary Kiona recordings and transcripts.
