= Tatoosh Wilderness =

Wilderness area in Washington, United States

- IUCN category Ib (wilderness area)
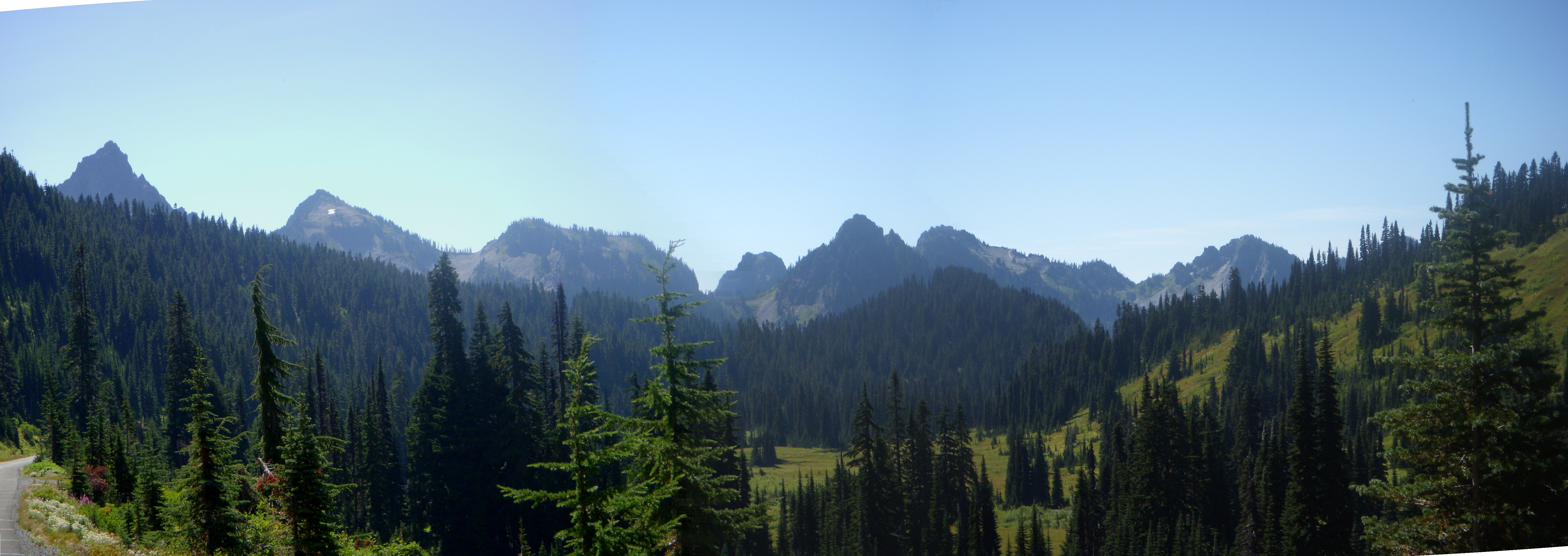
- The Tatoosh Range from Mount Rainier National Park

- Location within the United States
- Location: Lewis County, Washington, United States
- Nearest city: Olympia, WA
- Coordinates: 46°42′0″N 121°39′0″W
- Area: 15,725 acres (6,364 ha)
- Established: 1984
- Governing body: U.S. Forest Service
- Website: Tatoosh Wilderness

The Tatoosh Wilderness is a designated wilderness in the Gifford Pinchot National Forest in Washington in the Pacific Northwest region of the United States. The wilderness protects 15,725 acres (6,364 ha) managed by the U.S. Forest Service. It was officially designated as wilderness by Congress in 1984 to protect the scenic alpine environment that complements the adjacent Mount Rainier National Park. It features Tatoosh Peak, a member of the Tatoosh Range.

== History ==
Tatoosh means "breast" in the Chinook Jargon, in reference to the two large rock outcrops on the south face of Butter Peak.

The Tatoosh Range was used historically by Taidnapam (Upper Cowlitz) Indians. In mid-to-late August, Taidnapam families would climb up the ridge from fishing camps at the confluence of the Muddy Fork and Clear Fork Cowlitz Rivers, to hunt, gather materials for making baskets, and pick huckleberries for drying. The dried berries were transported to home villages for eating during the winter months. Archaeological evidence suggests that these high country treks were a long tradition among the local Indian people.

In 1932, a fire lookout was built. Author Martha Hardy wrote about her experiences keeping watch at the fire lookout in her 1947 book Tatoosh.

== Hiking ==
The Tatoosh Wilderness is accessible from the north from Mt. Rainier National Park and from the south via the Tatoosh Trail. A spur of the Tatoosh Trail extends to the location of the fire lookout that Martha Hardy wrote about, although only the foundations of the lookout building remain.
