= USS Amber =

Patrol vessel of the United States Navy

USS Amber (PYc-6)
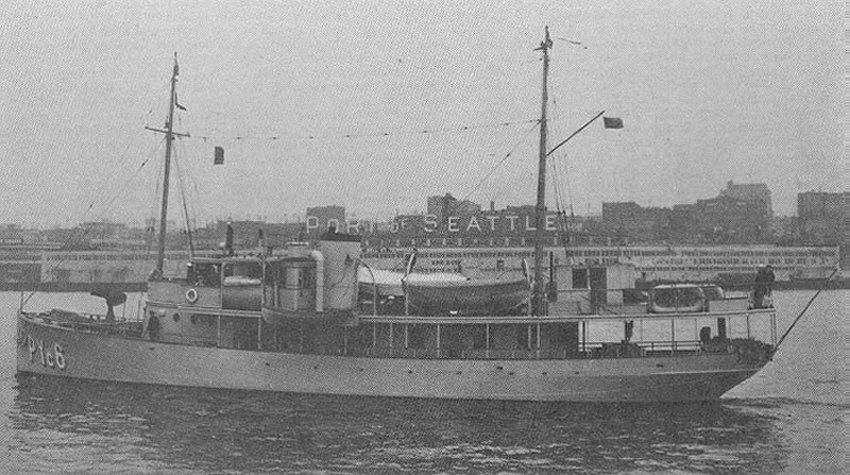
- USS Amber (PYc-6)

History

United States
- Builder: Craig Shipbuilding, Long Beach
- Yard number: 151
- Laid down: 15 September 1929
- Launched: 16 January 1930
- Commissioned: 3 March 1941
- Decommissioned: 18 October 1944
- Stricken: 13 November 1944
- Identification: MMSI number: 367035820; Callsign: WA9606
- Fate: Sold to previous owner on 13 June 1945
- Notes: U.S. Official No.: 229467

General characteristics
- Tonnage: 253 GRT
- Displacement: 260 t
- Length: 120 ft (37 m)
- Beam: 21 ft 5 in (6.53 m)
- Draft: 10 ft 6 in (3.20 m)
- Propulsion: 2 × 275 bhp (205 kW) Atlas diesel engines; twin shafts
- Speed: 12.5 knots (23.2 km/h; 14.4 mph)
- Armament: 1 × forward mounted 3-inch gun; 2 × rear-facing depth charge tracks

USS Amber (PYc-6) was a patrol boat in the United States Navy during World War II, built at Long Beach, California in 1930 as the yacht Infanta for the actor John Barrymore.

== Private yacht ==
Infanta was designed by Ted Geary and built by the Craig Shipbuilding in Long Beach, California for John Barrymore as a present to his wife, actress Dolores Costello. The keel was laid on 15 September 1929, launched on 16 January 1930 and named in honour of the couple's expected first child, Dee Dee Barrymore. The motor yacht was originally measured as 118 feet in length and with a tonnage of 253 GRT. Power was from two 275bhp Atlas-Imperial diesels driving twin propellers The Barrymores used the yacht sparingly, due to his preference for the simpler pleasures of his sailboat and his increasing alcoholism. By 18 July 1935 Infanta composed most of Barrymore's net worth, being assessed at $56,350 of his net $56,575. In 1937 the yacht, then valued at $75,000 was auctioned to satisfy a mortgage. The yacht was subsequently renamed Polaris by owners Edward and Kathryn Lowe of San Francisco and home-ported at Juneau, Alaska.

== Naval service ==
Polaris was purchased by the United States Navy on 23 December 1940, converted for naval service by the Winslow Marine Railway and Shipbuilding Co. Inc., Winslow, Washington. The yacht was renamed Amber on 10 January 1941 and simultaneously designated Coastal Patrol Yacht PYc-6, then placed in commission at Seattle on 3 March 1941.

Amber was assigned to the Inshore Patrol of the 13th Naval District and, from May until early August, operated around Seattle, Tacoma, and Port Townsend, Washington. The patrol craft left Seattle on 6 August on a cruise to Alaska, and visited Ketchikan, Juneau, and Sitka, before returning to Seattle early in September. In November, Amber was assigned to patrol duty at Astoria, Oregon, and patrolled the Strait of Juan de Fuca off Neah Bay, Washington, under the control of the Northwest Sea Frontier Patrol Group.

She was decommissioned on 18 October 1944 and her name was struck from the Navy list on 13 November 1944. Amber was sold back to her former owners on 13 June 1945.

== Return to civilian life ==
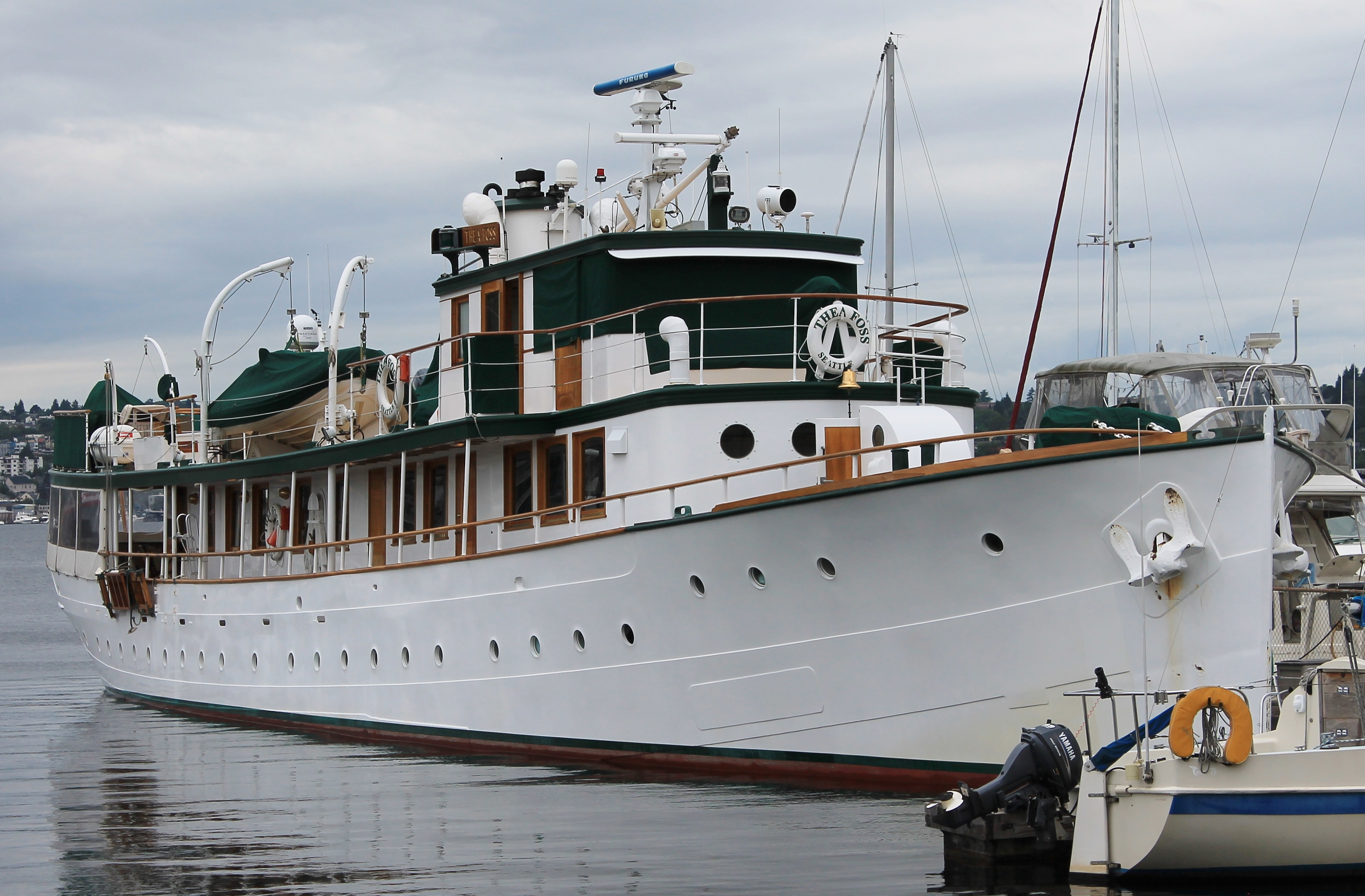
Thea Foss on Lake Union, August 2019.

Later in 1945 the yacht was sold to the Macco Construction Company of Clearwater, California and used as a freighter and for geological surveys, still as Amber. In 1950 she was purchased by the Foss Launch and Tug Company of Tacoma, Washington and restored there at their own shipyard as the company yacht, named for its founder Thea Foss. As of 2015, and now registered to Saltchuk Resources Inc, the parent company of Foss Maritime of Seattle, Thea Foss remains in service and has been used continually for the enjoyment of customers and other guests, including in 1975 King Olaf of Norway.

== See also ==
- List of patrol vessels of the United States Navy
