= Unicorn Glacier =

Glacier in Washington, US

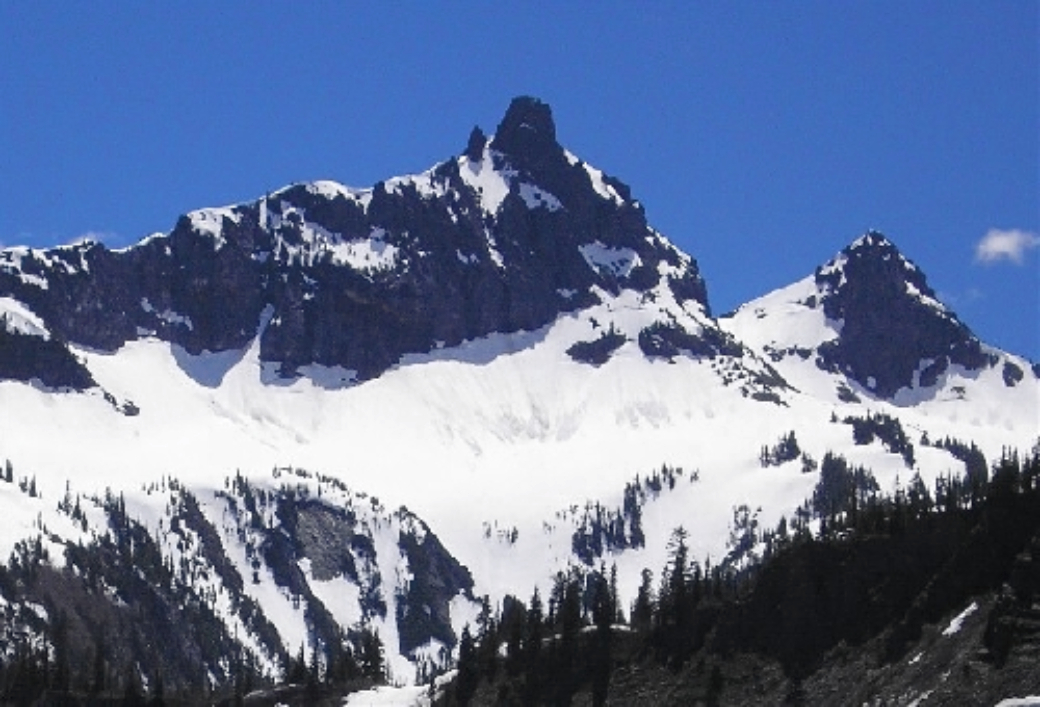
- Unicorn Glacier below the summit of Unicorn Peak in 2010

- Location within Washington (state)
- Type: Mountain glacier
- Location: Lewis County, Washington, U.S.
- Coordinates: 46°44′43″N 121°42′26″W
- Terminus: Talus
- Status: Extinct

Unicorn Glacier is in Mount Rainier National Park in the U.S. state of Washington, on the northwest slope of Unicorn Peak. Unicorn Glacier is a semi-permanent snowfield but is listed on older United States Geological Survey maps.

== See also ==
- List of glaciers in the United States
