= Foss Peak =

Mountain peak in Washington, USA

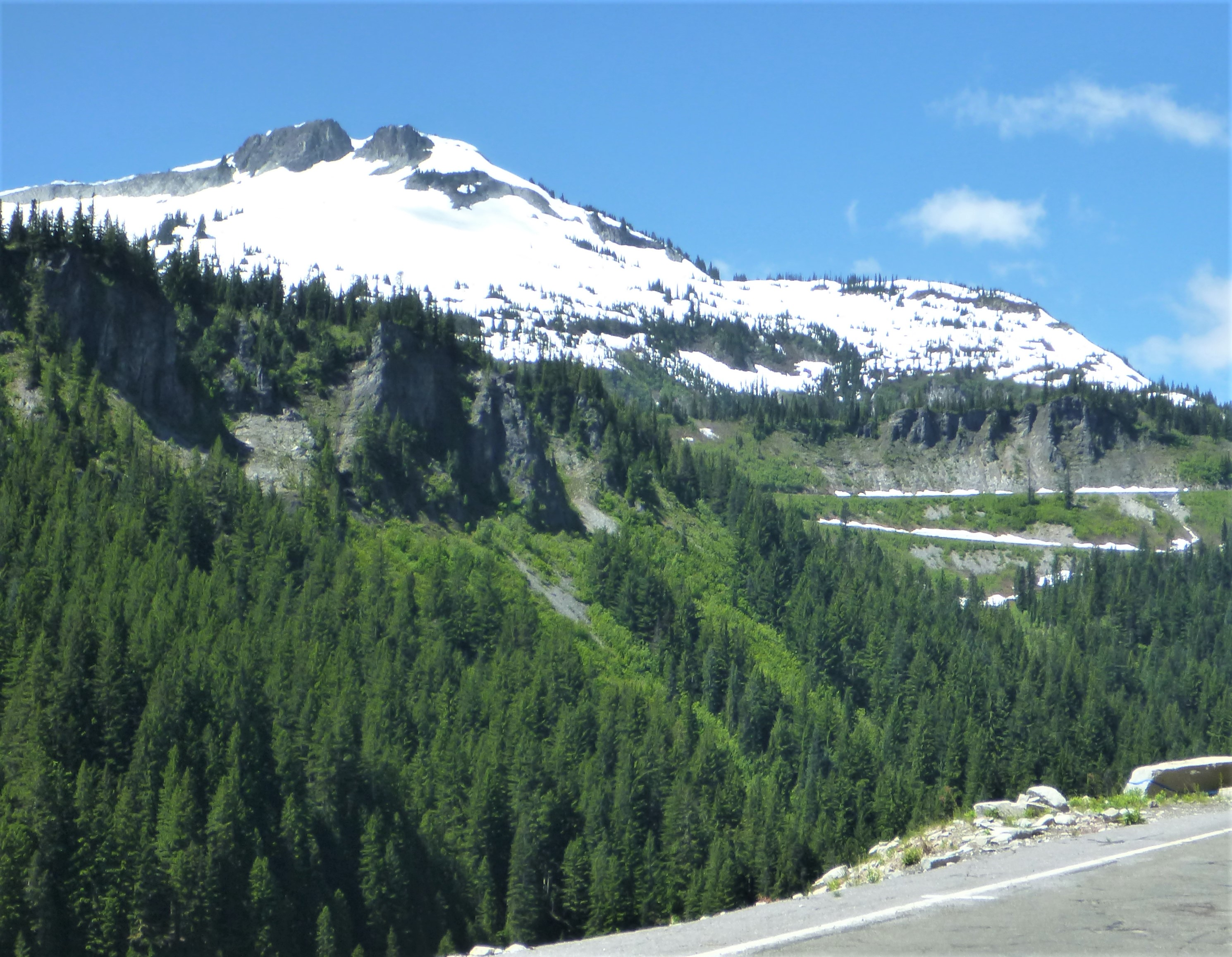
- Foss Peak from northeast

Highest point
- Elevation: 6,524 ft (1,989 m)
- Prominence: 404 ft (123 m)
- Parent peak: Unicorn Peak (6,971 ft)
- Isolation: 0.85 mi (1.37 km)
- Coordinates: 46°45′19″N 121°42′46″W

Geography
- Location within Washington (state) Location within the United States
- Country: United States
- State: Washington
- County: Lewis
- Protected area: Mount Rainier National Park
- Parent range: Cascades
- Topo map: USGS Mount Rainier East

Climbing
- Easiest route: class 2 scrambling

Foss Peak is a 6,524-foot (1,989-metre) summit in the Tatoosh Range which is a sub-range of the Cascade Range. It is located south of Mount Rainier within Mount Rainier National Park, in Lewis County of Washington state. The peak is named for Thea Foss (1857–1927), who founded the Foss Maritime Company with her husband in 1889. The peak also has an alternate name, Manatee Mountain. The nearest higher neighbor is West Unicorn Peak, 0.79 miles (1.27 km) to the southeast. Precipitation runoff from the mountain drains into tributaries of the Cowlitz River.

== Climate ==
Foss Peak is located in the marine west coast climate zone of western North America. Most weather fronts originating in the Pacific Ocean travel northeast toward the Cascade Mountains. As fronts approach, they are forced upward by the peaks of the Cascade Range (orographic lift), causing them to drop their moisture in the form of rain or snow onto the Cascades. As a result, the west side of the Cascades experiences high precipitation, especially during the winter months in the form of snowfall. Because of maritime influence, snow tends to be wet and heavy, resulting in avalanche danger. During winter months, weather is usually cloudy, but due to high pressure systems over the Pacific Ocean that intensify during summer months, there is often little or no cloud cover during the summer.

== Gallery ==
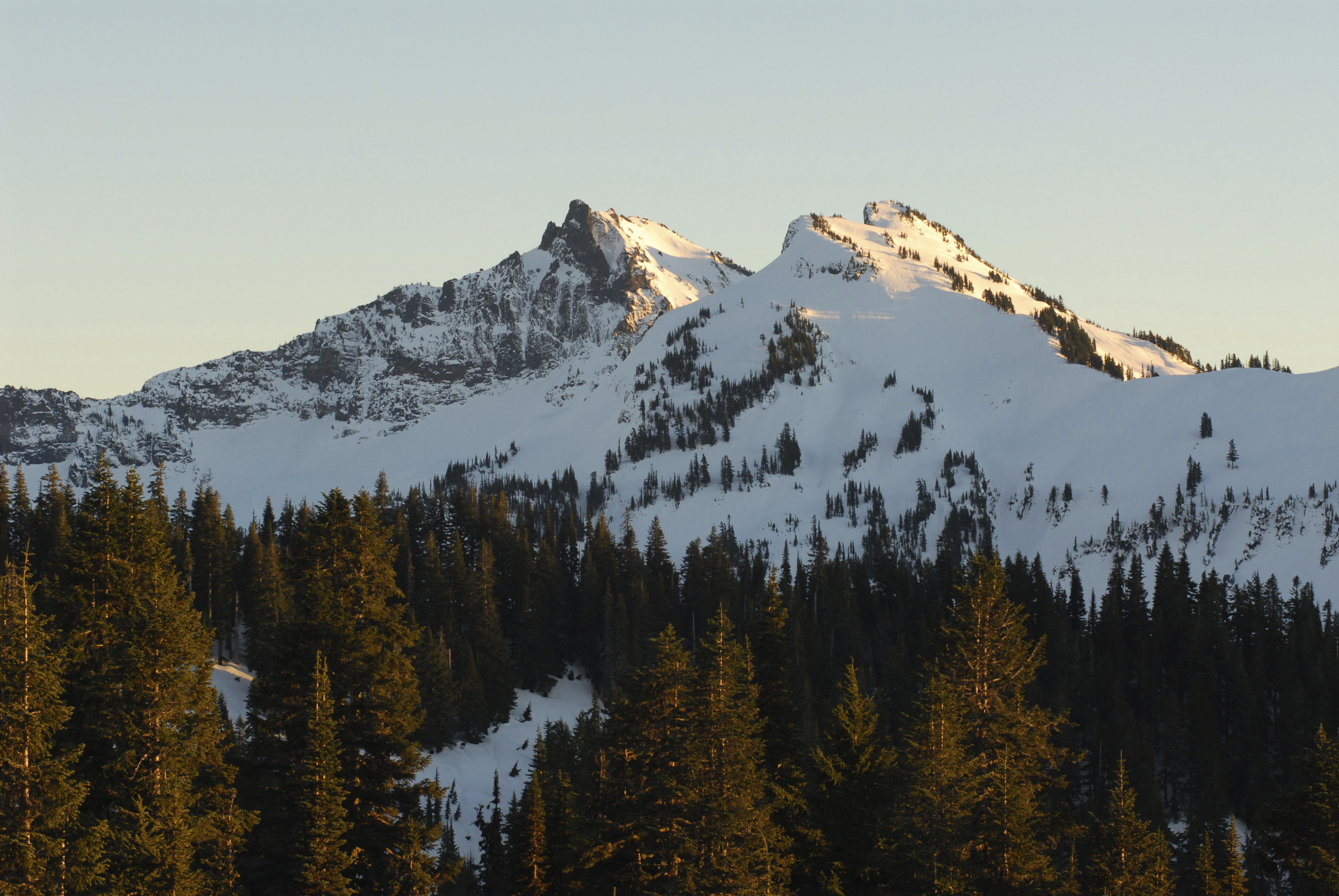
Unicorn Peak (left) and Foss Peak (right) in winter

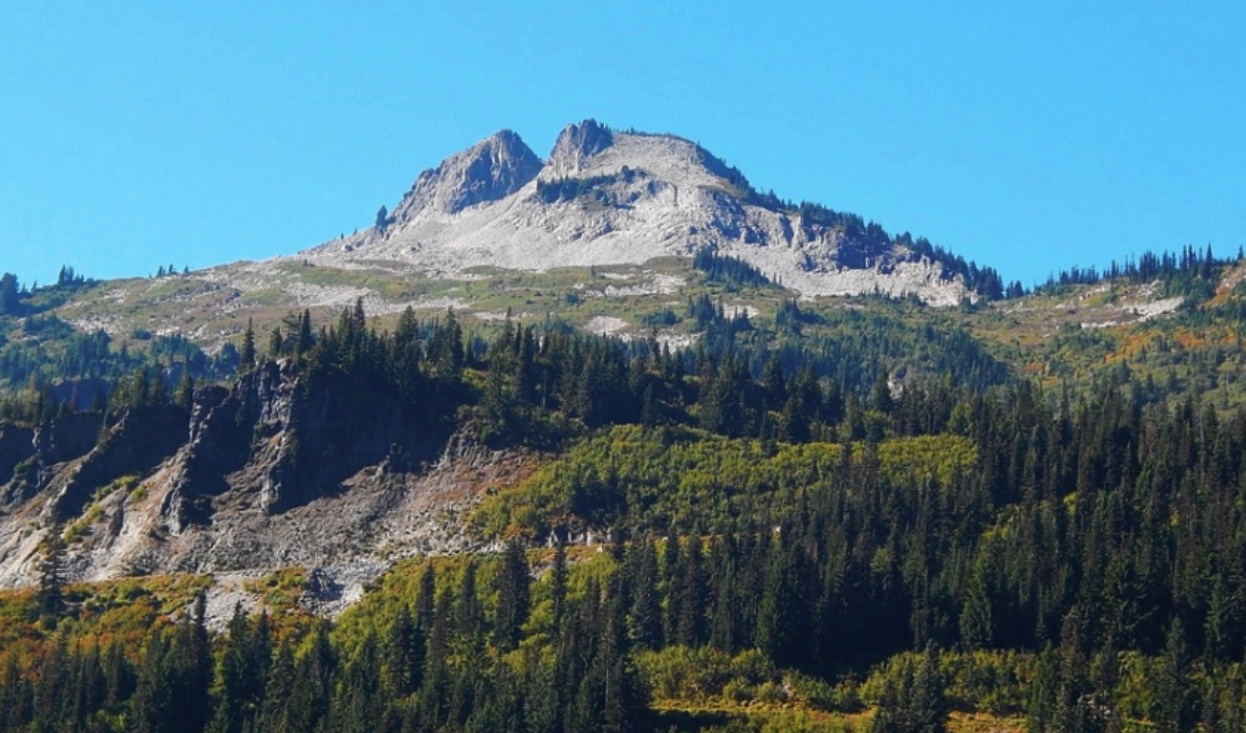
Foss Peak (aka Manatee Mountain)

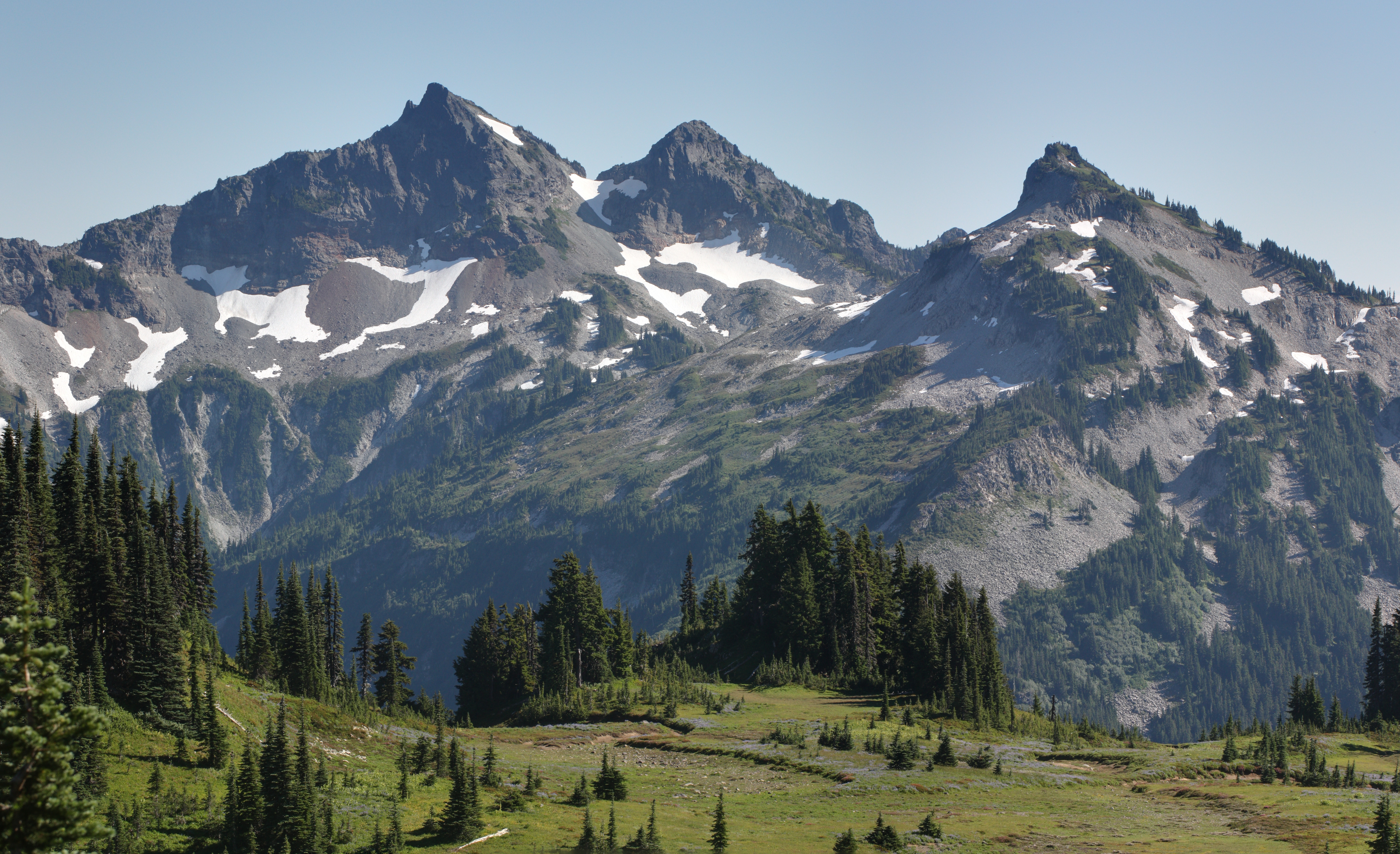
Unicorn Peak (left), West Unicorn Peak, and Foss Peak (right)

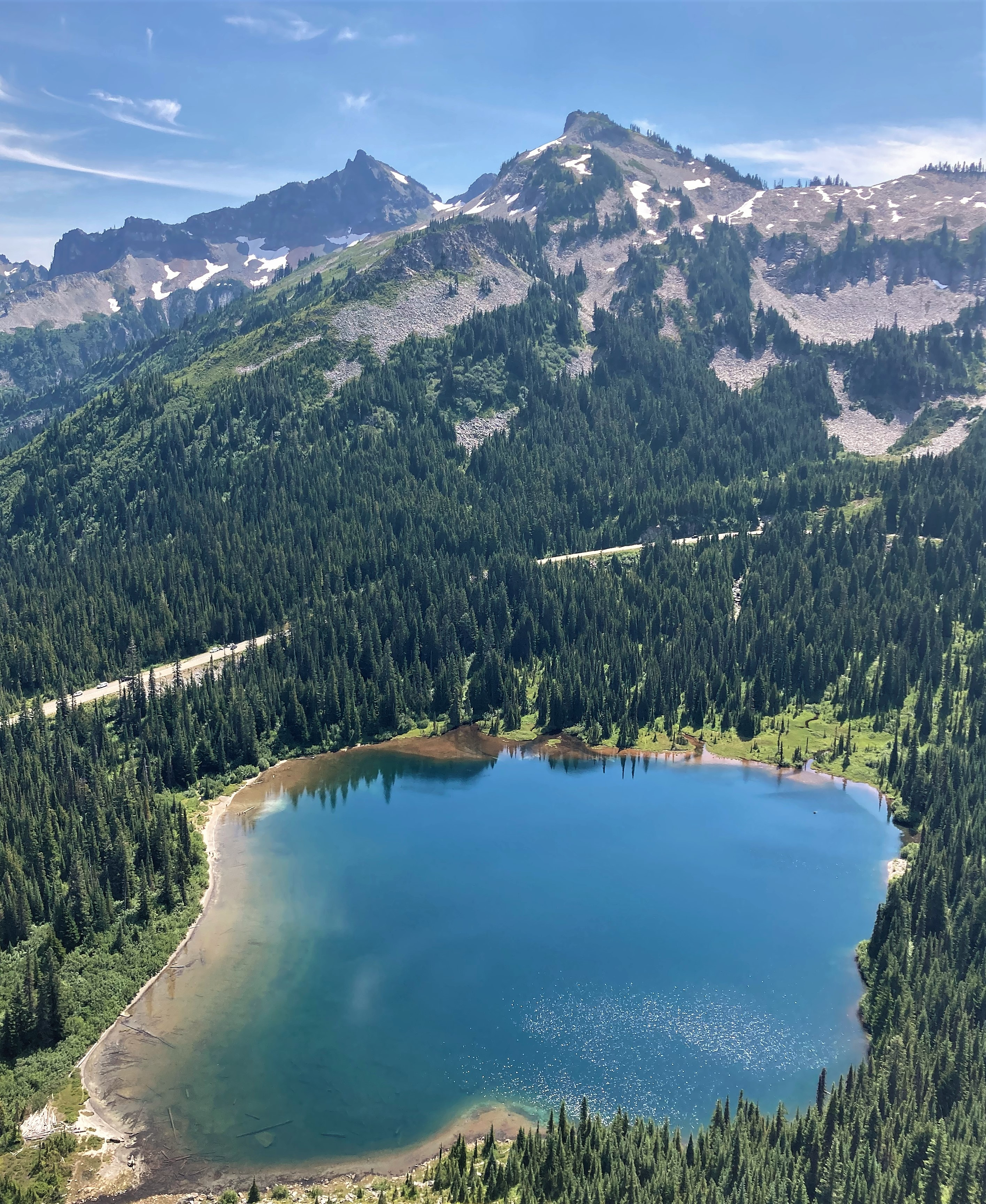
Louise Lake, Foss Peak, and Unicorn Peak.

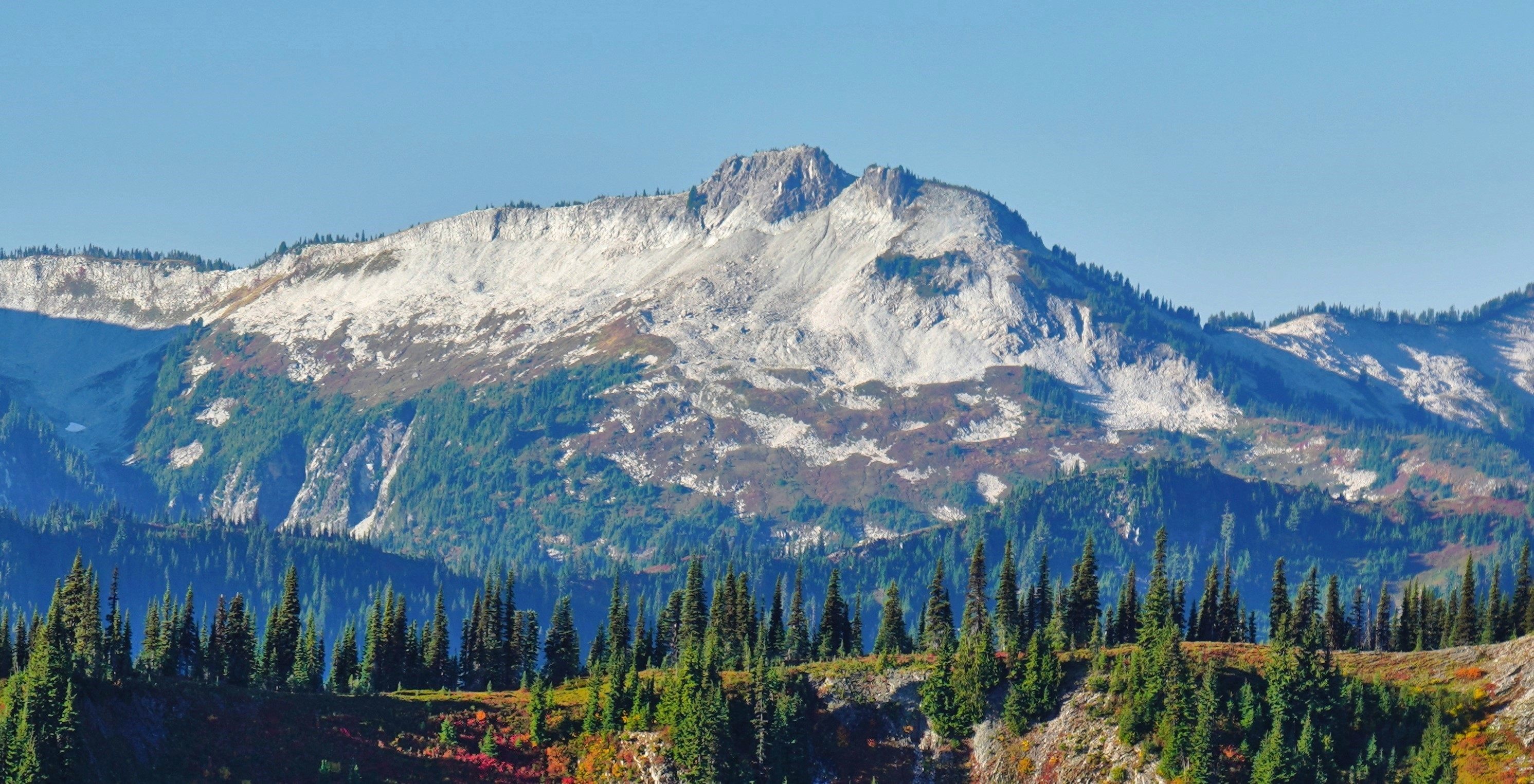
North-northeast aspect of Foss Peak

== See also ==
- List of geographic features in Lewis County, Washington
