= Chutla Peak =

Mountain in Washington (state), United States

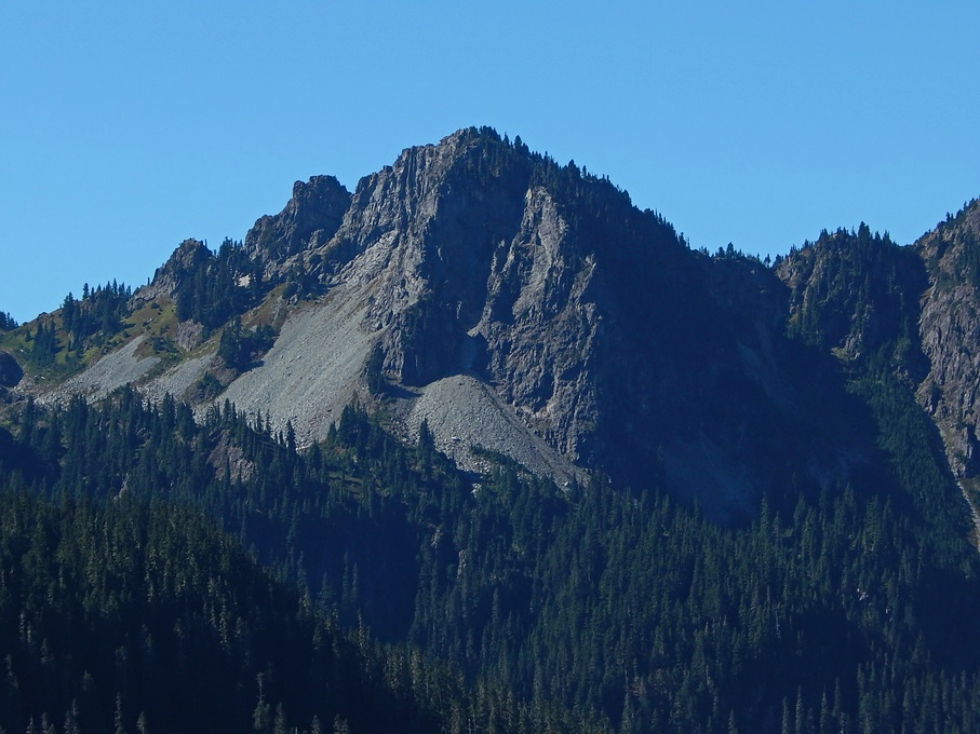

Highest point
- Elevation: 6,007 ft (1,831 m)
- Prominence: 600 ft (183 m)
- Parent peak: Wahpenayo Peak
- Isolation: 0.56 mi (0.90 km)
- Coordinates: 46°45′10″N 121°46′30″W

Geography
- Location within Washington (state) Location within the United States
- Country: United States
- State: Washington
- County: Lewis
- Protected area: Mount Rainier National Park
- Parent range: Cascades
- Topo map: USGS Mount Rainier West

Climbing
- Easiest route: Scrambling class 3

Chutla Peak is a summit in Lewis County of Washington state. It is set on the crest of the Tatoosh Range which is a sub-range of the Cascade Range. The peak is located south of Mount Rainier within Mount Rainier National Park. The mountain's name "Chutla" derives from Chinook Jargon which means "rock". Precipitation runoff from the peak drains to the Nisqually River.

== Climate ==
Chutla Peak is located in the marine west coast climate zone of western North America. Most weather fronts originating in the Pacific Ocean travel northeast toward the Cascade Mountains. As fronts approach, they are forced upward by the peaks of the Cascade Range (orographic lift), causing them to drop their moisture in the form of rain or snow onto the Cascades. As a result, the west side of the Cascades experiences high precipitation, especially during the winter months in the form of snowfall. Because of maritime influence, snow tends to be wet and heavy, resulting in avalanche danger. During winter months, weather is usually cloudy, but due to high pressure systems over the Pacific Ocean that intensify during summer months, there is often little or no cloud cover during the summer. Due to its temperate climate and proximity to the Pacific Ocean, areas west of the Cascade Crest very rarely experience temperatures below 0 °F (−18 °C) or above 80 °F (27 °C).

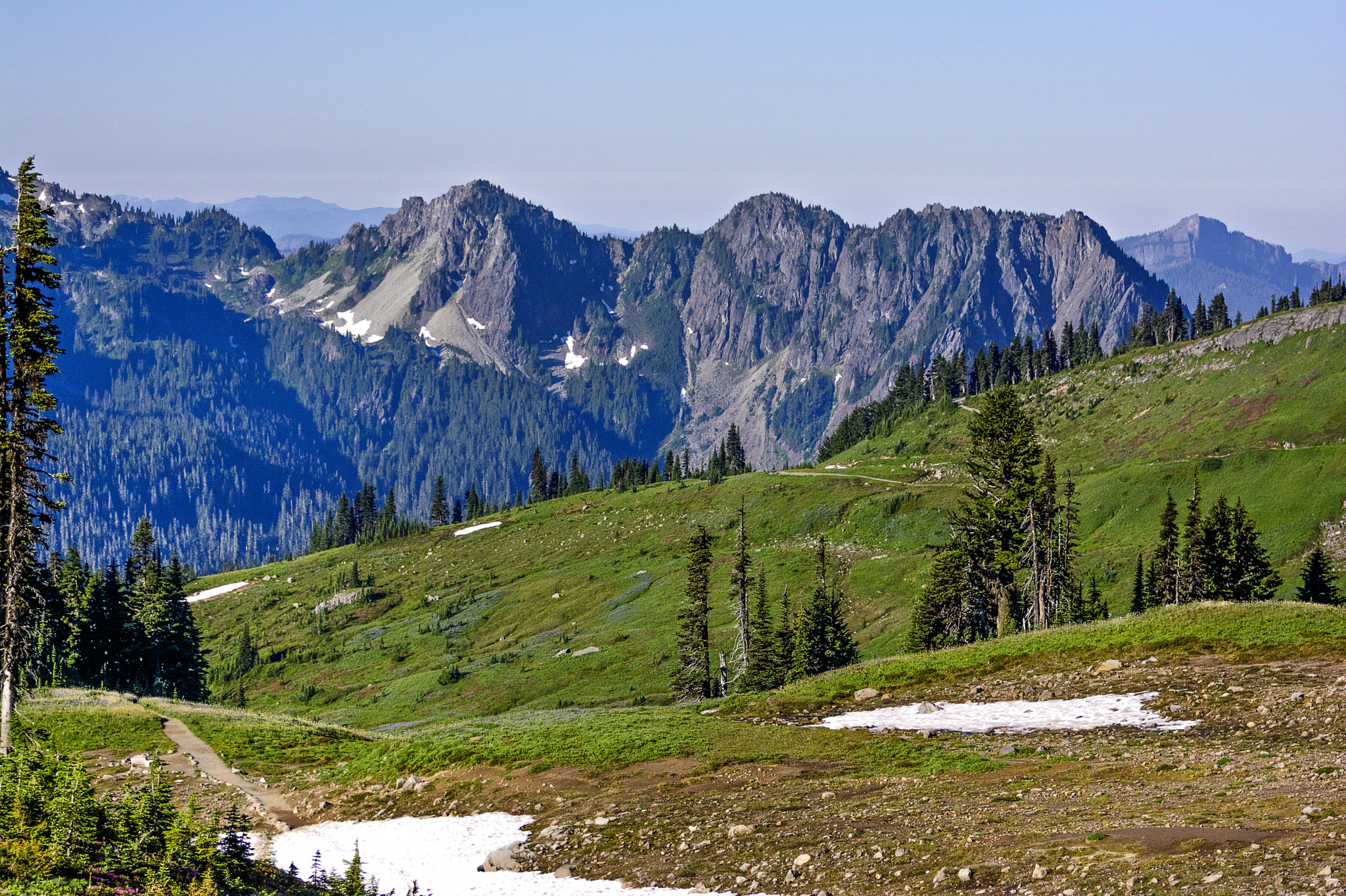
Chutla Peak and Eagle Peak seen from a meadow above Paradise

== See also ==
- List of geographic features in Lewis County, Washington
