= Unicorn Peak =

Mountain in Washington (state), United States

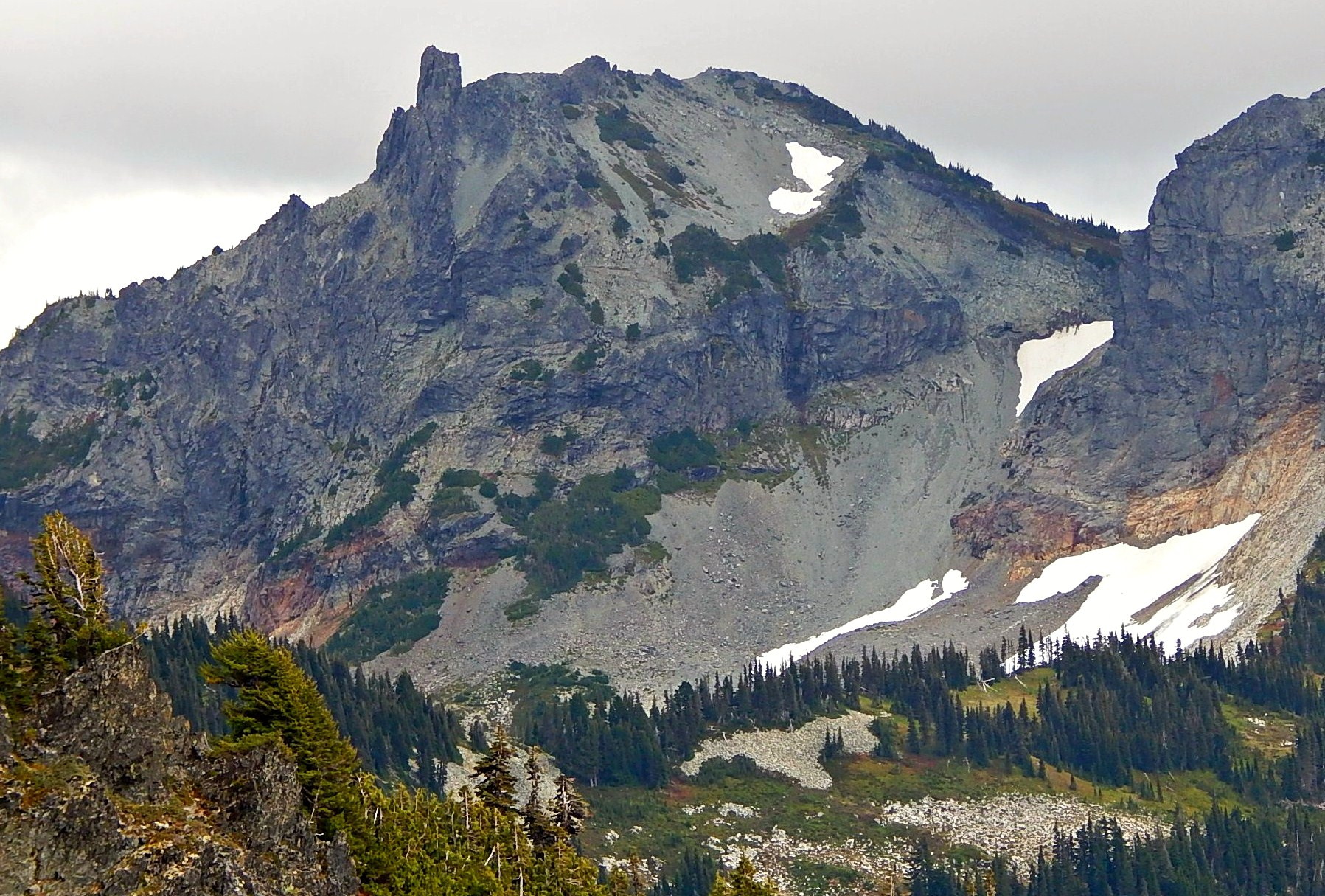

Highest point
- Elevation: 6,971 ft (2,125 m)
- Prominence: 2,091 ft (637 m)
- Parent peak: Mount Rainier
- Isolation: 4.72 mi (7.60 km)
- Coordinates: 46°44′42″N 121°42′03″W

Geography
- Location within Washington (state)
- Country: United States
- State: Washington
- County: Lewis
- Protected area: Mount Rainier National Park
- Parent range: Tatoosh Range; Cascades
- Topo map: USGS Tatoosh Lakes

Climbing
- Easiest route: class 3 climbing

Unicorn Peak is a 6,971-foot (2,125-metre) mountain summit in Lewis County of Washington state, United States. It is the highest point in the Tatoosh Range which is a sub-range of the Cascade Range. It is located in Mount Rainier National Park, south of Mount Rainier. Precipitation runoff from the mountain's small glaciers, such as Unicorn Glacier, drains into tributaries of the Cowlitz River. The descriptive name is for the mountain's resemblance to the head and horn of a unicorn. The toponym was officially adopted in 1913 by the U.S. Board on Geographic Names.

== Climate ==
Unicorn Peak is located in the marine west coast climate zone of western North America. Most weather fronts originating in the Pacific Ocean travel northeast toward the Cascade Mountains. As fronts approach, they are forced upward by the peaks of the Cascade Range (orographic lift), causing them to drop their moisture in the form of rain or snow onto the Cascades. As a result, the west side of the Cascades experiences high precipitation, especially during the winter months in the form of snowfall. Because of maritime influence, snow tends to be wet and heavy, resulting in avalanche danger. During winter months, weather is usually cloudy, but due to high pressure systems over the Pacific Ocean that intensify during summer months, there is often little or no cloud cover during the summer. Due to its temperate climate and proximity to the Pacific Ocean, areas west of the Cascade Crest very rarely experience temperatures below 0 °F (−18 °C) or above 80 °F (27 °C).

== Gallery ==
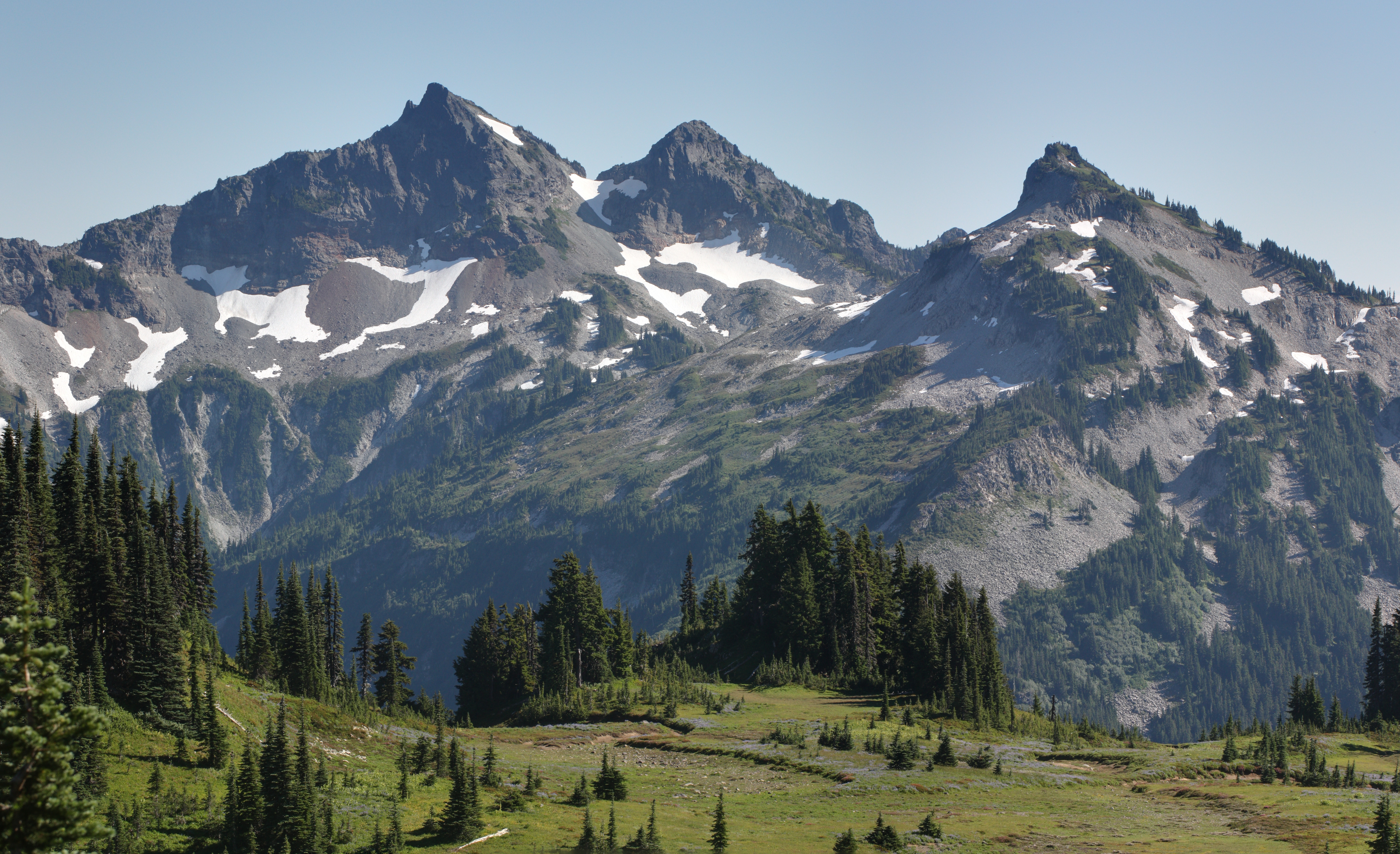
Unicorn Peak (left), with West Unicorn Peak (center), and Foss Peak (right)

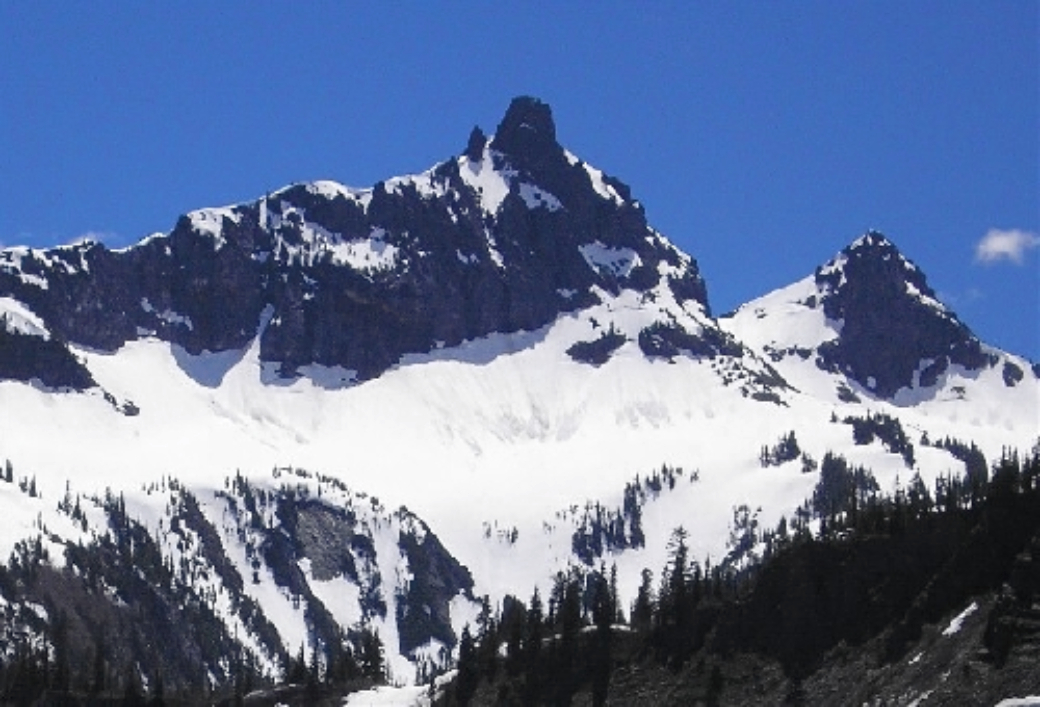
Unicorn Peak

== See also ==
- Geology of the Pacific Northwest
- Geography of Washington (state)
- List of geographic features in Lewis County, Washington
