= Tatoosh Range =

Mountain range in Washington, United States

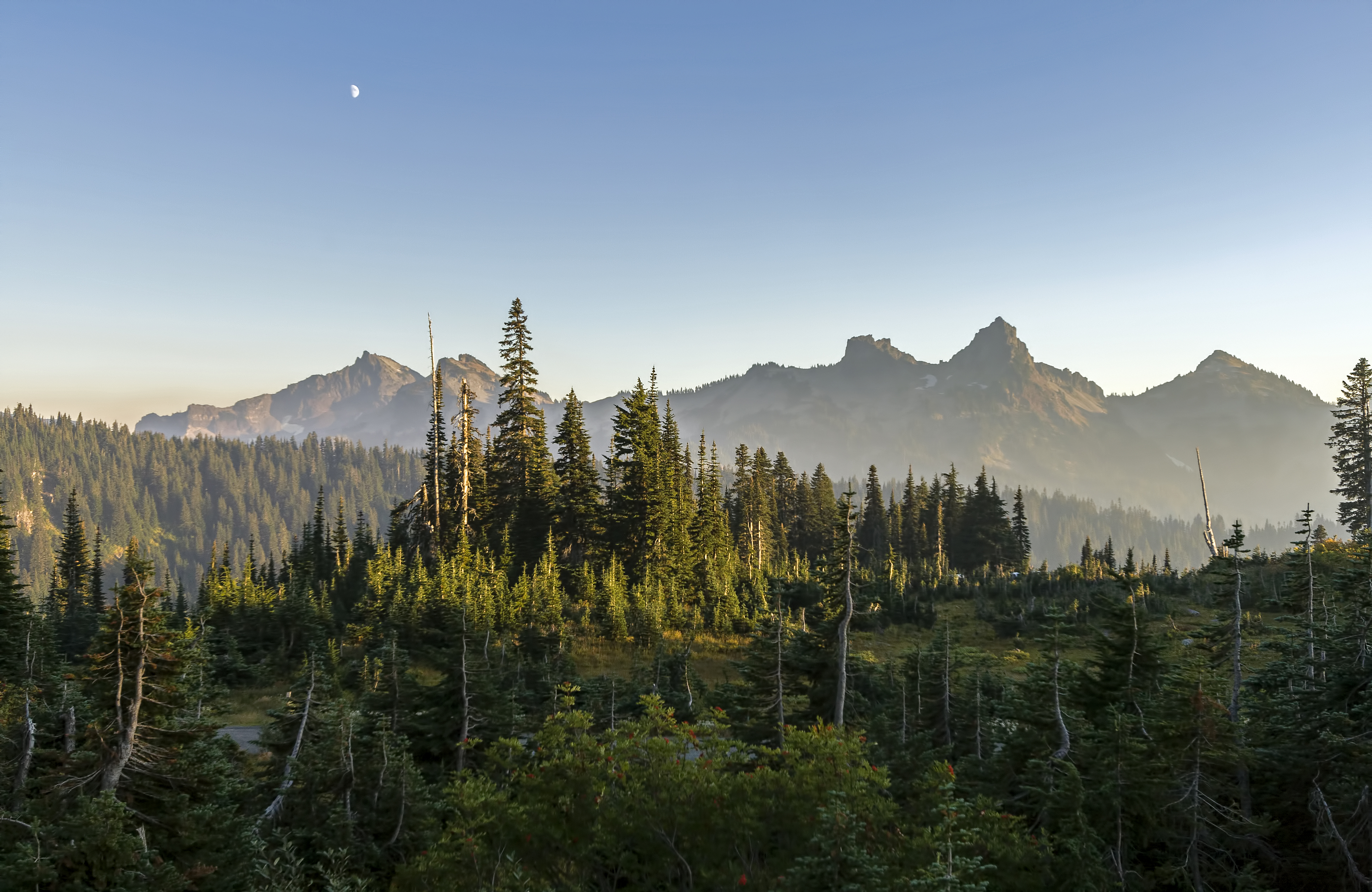
- The Tatoosh Range from Paradise, in Mount Rainier National Park, Washington

Highest point
- Elevation: 6,971 ft (2,125 m)

Geography
- Location within Washington (state)
- Country: United States
- State: Washington
- Part of: Mount Rainier National Park and Tatoosh Wilderness
- Range coordinates: 46°44′42″N 121°42′00″W
- Parent range: Cascades

The Tatoosh Range is a mountain range located in Mount Rainier National Park and the adjacent Tatoosh Wilderness in the state of Washington, in the Pacific Northwest region of the United States. The range runs roughly east–west, beginning with the southeastern Moon Mountain and concluding with the western Rainbow Mountain and Eagle Peak. The range includes 25 prominent named peaks. The peaks average nearly 6,420 ft (1,960 m) in summit elevation, with the highest, Unicorn Peak, measuring at a height of 6,971 ft (2,125 m). Visitors to Mount Rainier can view the range from the Paradise area, and the range is popular with hikers.

== History ==
While some of the peaks, including the distinctive Unicorn Peak, are named for their appearance, others are named in honor of notable individuals. Lane Peak, for example, honors Franklin Knight Lane, former United States Secretary of the Interior.

Like other ranges, the Tatoosh Range has seen its share of casualties. In 1924, an assistant mountain guide named Paul Moser fell to his death attempting to scale Unicorn Peak by a new route. In 2004, 16-year-old Vasiliy Kozorezov fell and died while hiking off-trail below the Eagle Peak Trail. Unexpected or extreme weather conditions can also cause problems. In 1946, heavy fog caused park employees Donald Carlson and James Pratt to get lost in the range for two days, but as the weather improved, they were able to find their way back.

In 1910, a USGS crew made the first recorded summit of the peaks. In the 1920s and 1930s, farmers regularly let their cattle graze along the Tatoosh Range. In 1937, attempts were made to film the movie Thin Ice on location, but blizzards made it impossible, so the crew and actors Tyrone Power and Sonja Henie returned to California to shoot the movie in a studio, while director Dave Butler and a cameraman stayed behind to collect footage of the Tatoosh Range to use for the background images.

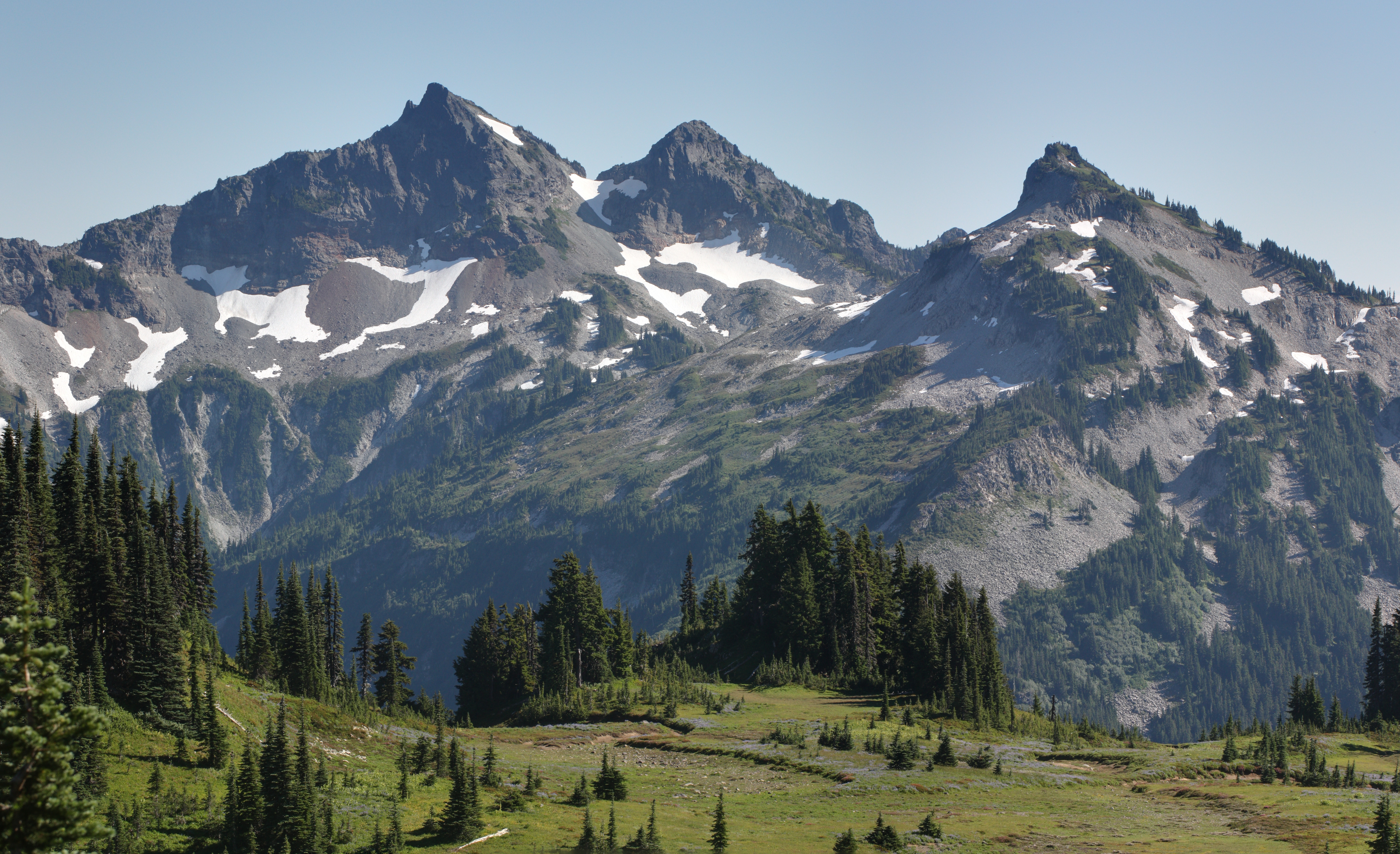
Unicorn Peak (left) and Manatee Mountain (right)

== Peaks ==
Peaks in the Tatoosh Range include:

- Unicorn Peak: 6,971 ft. (2,125m)
- West Unicorn Peak: 6,840 ft. (2,085m)
- Boundary Peak: 6,780 ft. (2,067m)
- Stevens Peak: 6,580 ft. (2,006m)
- Pinnacle Peak: 6,562 ft. (2,000m)
- Foss Peak (Manatee Mountain): 6,524 ft. (1,989m)
- The Castle: 6,460 ft. (1,969m)
- Bench Peak: 6,401 ft. (1,951m)
- Plummer Peak: 6,370 ft. (1,942m)
- Tatoosh Peak: 6,310 ft. (1,923m)
- Blue Peak: 6,235 ft. (1,900m)
- Wahpenayo Peak: 6,231 ft. (1899m)
- Cliff Peak: 6,153 ft. (1,875m)
- Packwood Peak: 6,050 ft. (1,844m)
- Chutla Peak: 6,020 ft. (1,835m)
- Lane Peak: 6,012 ft. (1,832m)
- Denman Peak: 6,006 ft. (1,831m)
- Fizrenken Peak: 5,961 ft. (1,817m)
- Carter Peak: 5,958 ft. (1,816m)
- Butter Peak: 5,919 ft. (1,804m)
- Eagle Peak: 5,908 ft. (1,801m)
- Johnson Peak: 5,868 ft. (1,789m)
- The Backbone: 5,831 ft. (1,777m)
- Moon Mountain: 5,096 ft. (1,553m)
- Rainbow Mountain: 4,868 ft. (1,484m)

== Recreation ==
During the summer, the Tatoosh Range is a popular attraction for hikers. From within Mount Rainier National Park, the range can be accessed from Eagle Peak Trailhead, Pinnacle Peak Trailhead, and Snow Lake Trailhead. Tatoosh Peak and Butter Peak are located outside of Mount Rainier National Park, but may be accessed from the Tatoosh Wilderness Area via Tatoosh Trail #161. Some peaks are able to be reached by hillwalking, while others can only be summited on alpine routes by scrambling and rock climbing. In the winter, the range is used by skiers and snowshoers.

== See also ==
- List of geographic features in Lewis County, Washington
- List of mountain ranges in Washington
