= Lane Peak =

Mountain in Washington, United States

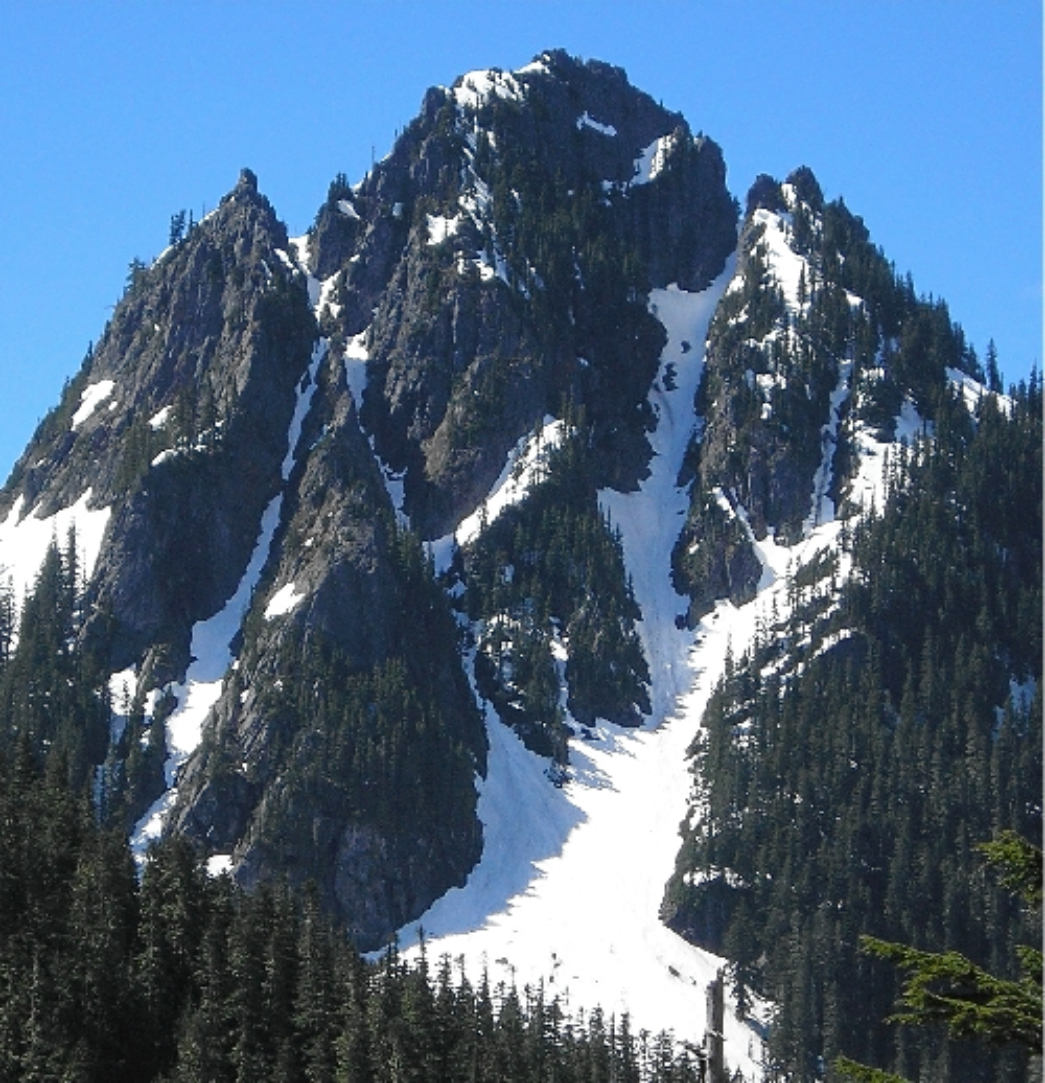

Highest point
- Elevation: 6,012 ft (1,832 m)
- Prominence: 332 ft (101 m)
- Isolation: 0.71 mi (1.14 km)
- Coordinates: 46°45′29″N 121°45′11″W

Naming
- Etymology: Franklin Knight Lane

Geography
- Location within Washington (state) Location within the United States
- Country: United States
- State: Washington
- County: Lewis
- Protected area: Mount Rainier National Park
- Parent range: Cascades
- Topo map: USGS Mount Rainier West

Climbing
- Easiest route: Scrambling class 4

Lane Peak is a 6,012-foot (1,832-metre) mountain summit in Lewis County of Washington state. It is situated on the crest of the Tatoosh Range which is a sub-range of the Cascade Range. It is located south of Mount Rainier within Mount Rainier National Park.

Lane Peak's toponym honors United States Secretary of the Interior Franklin Knight Lane, who presided over the establishment of the National Park Service in 1917. Precipitation runoff on the south side of the peak drains into tributaries of the Cowlitz River, whereas the north side drains into tributaries of the Nisqually River.

== Climate ==
Lane Peak is located in the marine west coast climate zone of western North America. Most weather fronts originating in the Pacific Ocean travel northeast toward the Cascade Mountains. As fronts approach, they are forced upward by the peaks of the Cascade Range (orographic lift), causing them to drop their moisture in the form of rain or snow onto the Cascades. As a result, the west side of the Cascades experiences high precipitation, especially during the winter months in the form of snowfall. Because of maritime influence, snow tends to be wet and heavy, resulting in avalanche danger. During winter months, weather is usually cloudy, but due to high pressure systems over the Pacific Ocean that intensify during summer months, there is often little or no cloud cover during the summer. Due to its temperate climate and proximity to the Pacific Ocean, areas west of the Cascade Crest very rarely experience temperatures below 0 °F (−18 °C) or above 80 °F (27 °C).

== Climbing Routes ==
Climbing Routes on Lane Peak

- Lover's Lane - WI2 Moderate Snow 1500 ft
- The Zipper - WI2 M2 Steep Snow 1000 ft, 3 pitches
- The Fly
- South Face

== Gallery ==
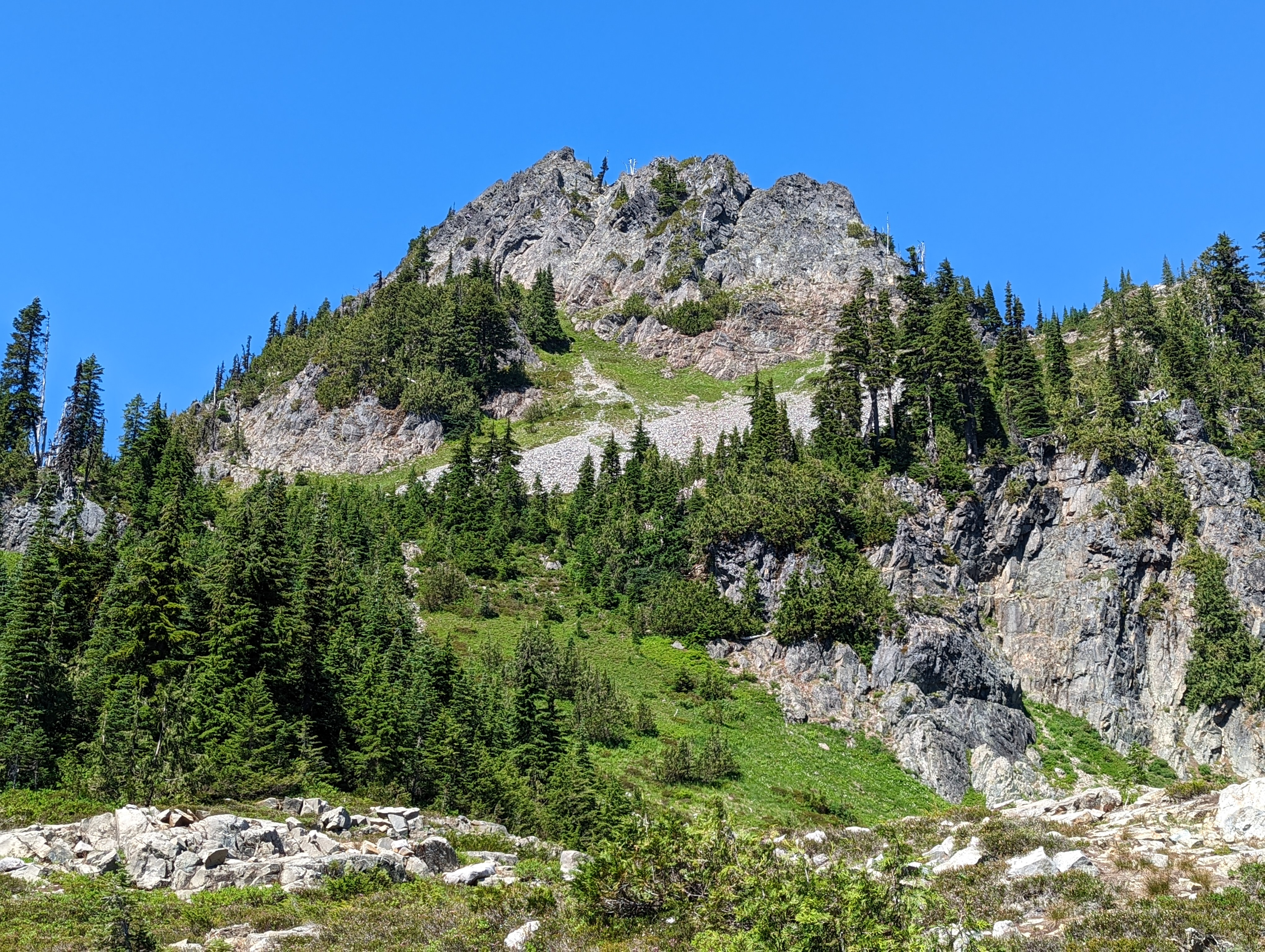
Lane Peak's southeast face in summer

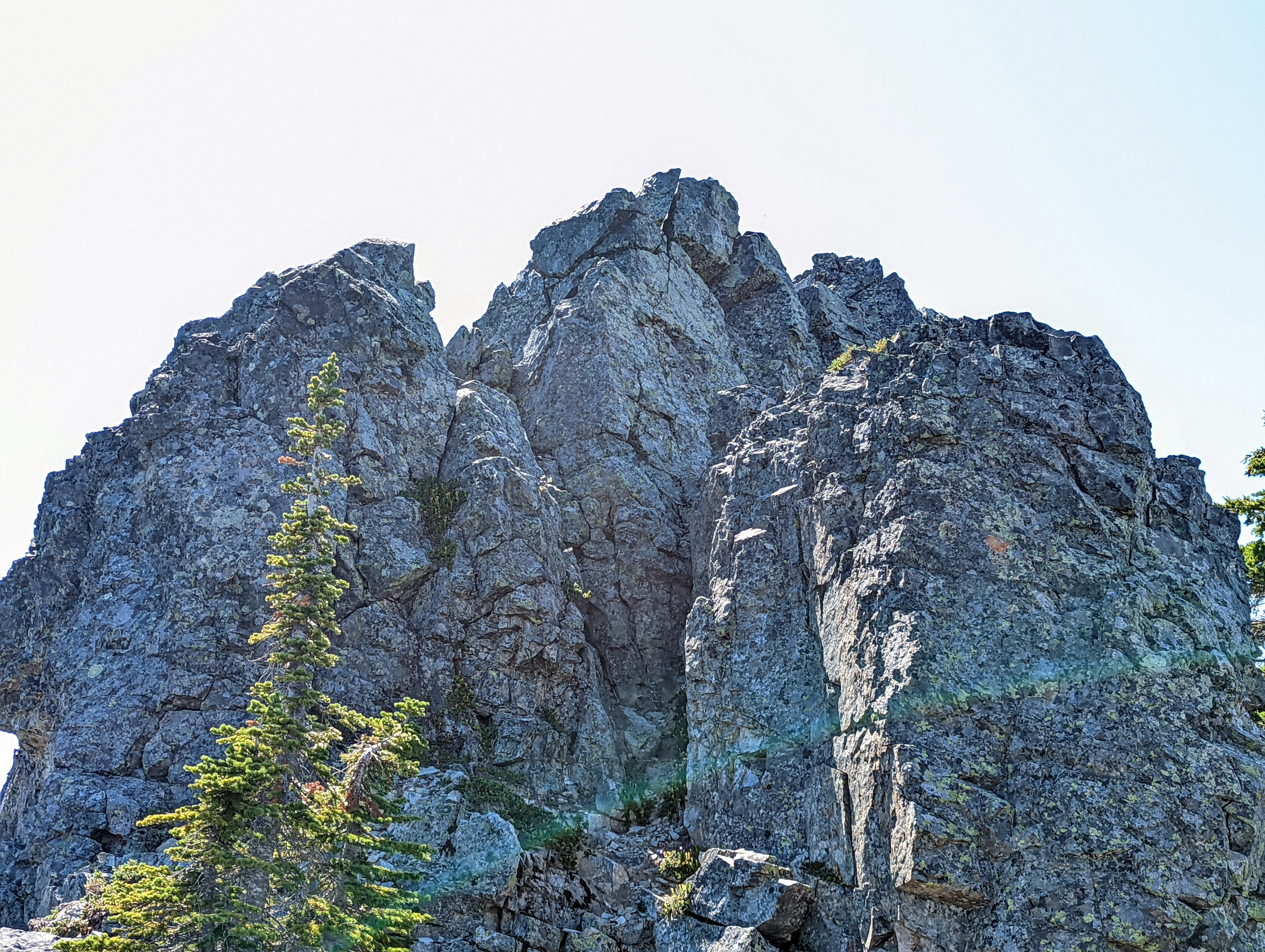
Looking up at the east side Lane Peak's summit block

== See also ==
- List of geographic features in Lewis County, Washington
