= Plummer Peak =

Mountain in Washington (state), United States

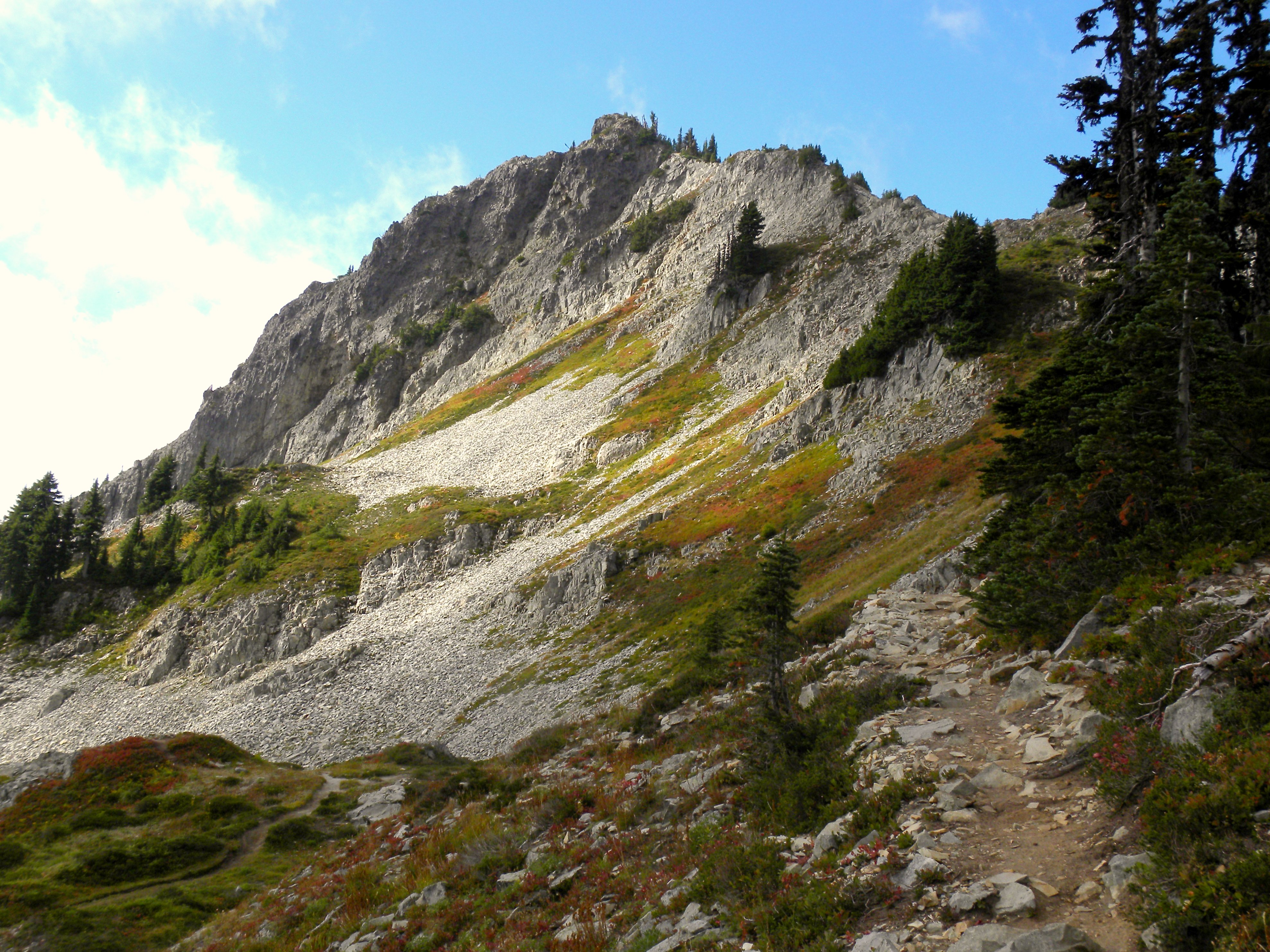
- Plummer Peak

Highest point
- Elevation: 6,374 ft (1,943 m) NAVD 88
- Prominence: 410 ft (125 m)
- Coordinates: 46°45′12″N 121°44′22″W

Geography
- Location within Washington (state)
- Location: Mount Rainier National Park, Washington, U.S.
- Parent range: Cascades, Tatoosh Range
- Topo map: USGS Mount Rainier East

Plummer Peak is a summit located in Mount Rainier National Park in Lewis County, Washington. With an elevation of 6,374 feet (1,943 m) it is the seventh highest peak in the Tatoosh Range. It was named for Fred G. Plummer, a Forest Service cartographer who taught geography in Tacoma Public Schools.

Hiking to the summit requires a mix of hillwalking and scrambling. The area is also used for skiing, though avalanches present a danger; in 1988, skier Pamela Benton Lee died after being buried by an avalanche on Plummer Peak.

From the peak, views of Mount Rainier, the town of Packwood, the Goat Rocks, Mount St. Helens, and Mount Adams are visible. A small tarn is located on the side of the summit. A col called "The Saddle" creates a walkable ridge connecting Plummer Peak to its neighbor, Pinnacle Peak.

== Gallery ==
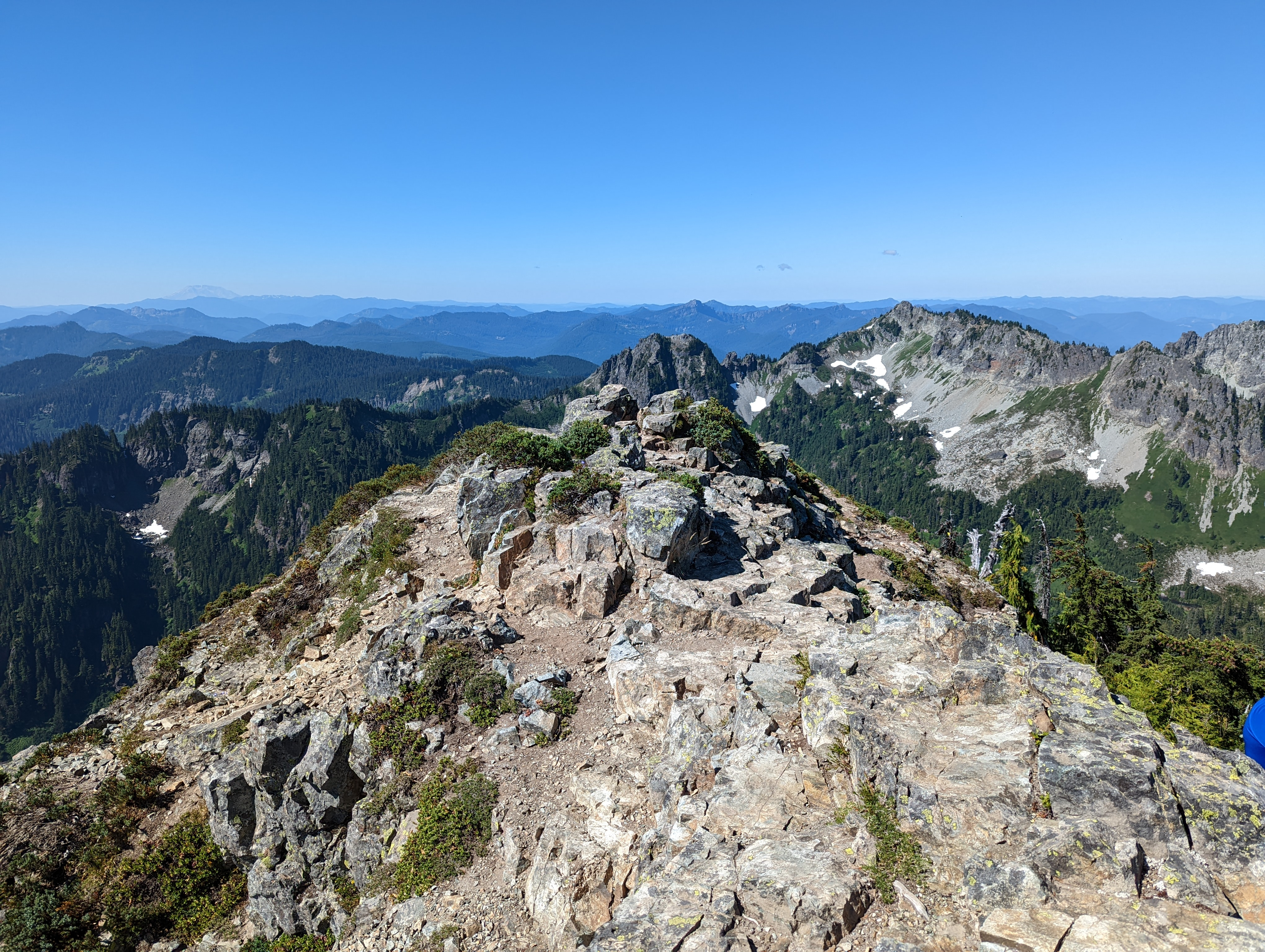
Summit of Plummer Peak

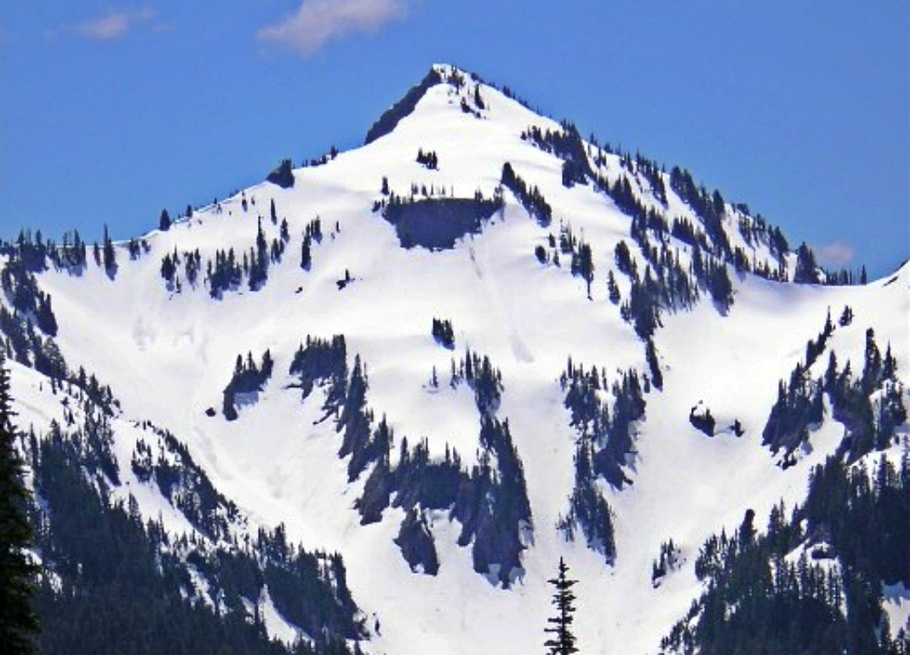
A snow-covered Plummer Peak

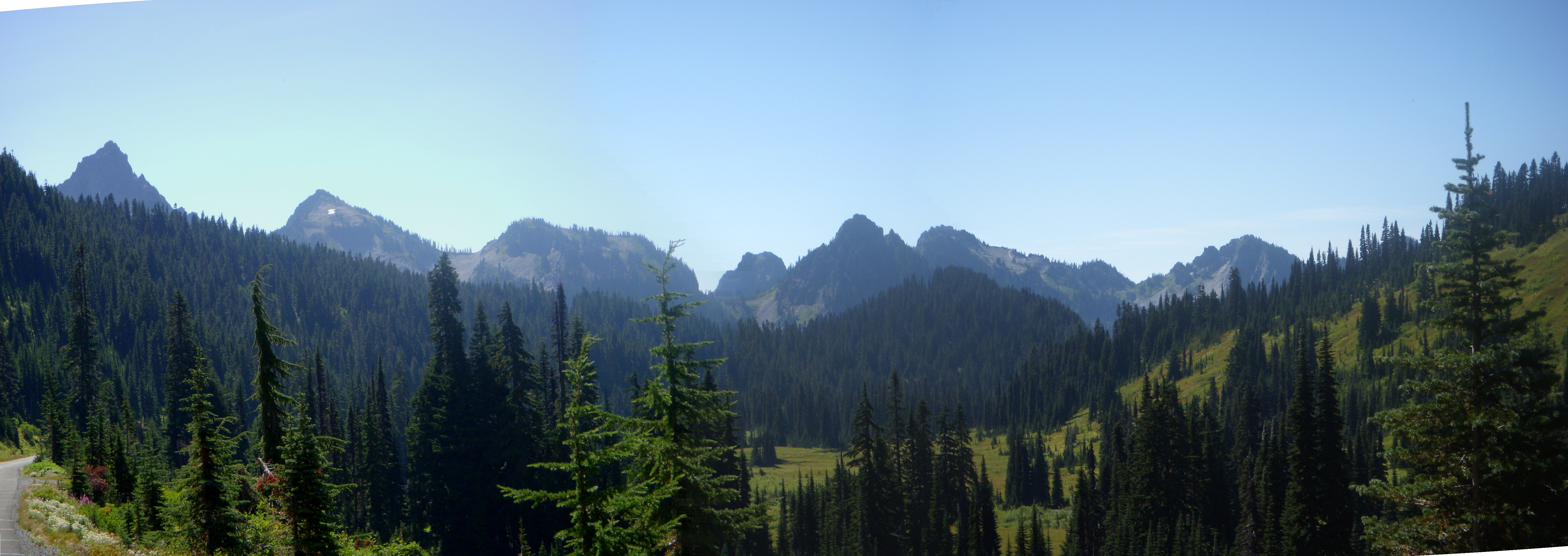
The Tatoosh Range, taken near Paradise

== See also ==
- List of geographic features in Lewis County, Washington
