= KCFL =

KCFL may refer to:

- KCFL (FM), a defunct radio station (90.1 FM) formerly licensed to serve Glenoma, Washington, United States
- KCFL-LP, a low-power radio station (105.1 FM) licensed to serve Aberdeen, Washington
- KBSG (FM), a radio station (90.1 FM) licensed to serve Raymond, Washington, which held the call sign KCFL from 2012 to 2015
- KWJZ-LP, a radio station (104.5 FM) licensed to serve Fall City, Washington, which held the call sign KCFL-LP from 2005 to 2009
