= Pinnacle Glacier =

Pinnacle Glacier may refer to:

- Pinnacle Glacier (Lewis County, Washington)
- Pinnacle Glacier (Mount Adams)
