= Cora Lake =

Lake in Lewis County, Washington

- Lake Tannamus
- Cora Lake, Lewis County, 2026

- Cora Lake Cora Lake (the United States)
- Interactive map of Cora Lake
- Location: Lewis County, Washington
- Coordinates: 46°41′16.95″N 121°53′25.94″W
- Part of: Gifford Pinchot National Forest
- Primary outflows: Big Creek
- Managing agency: Washington Department of Fish and Wildlife
- Surface area: 25.7 acres (10.4 ha)
- Surface elevation: 3,834 feet (1,169 m)
- Islands: None
- References: GNIS feature ID - 1518101

Cora Lake is a body of water located in eastern Lewis County, Washington. The lake is situated within Gifford Pinchot National Forest and sits below High Rock and High Rock Lookout.

Recreational fishing is permitted at Cora Lake which is accessible by a trail that passes over Big Creek and around a set of waterfalls.

== Etymology ==
The waters have also been known as Lake Tannamus, according to the Geographic Names Information System. The community of Cora, Washington shares the same name; the moniker was derived from the first name of either the wife or niece of the town's founder.

== Geography ==
Cora Lake, part of Gifford Pinchot National Forest, is located roughly southeast of Ashford and due south of the southern expanse of Mount Rainier National Park. The lake sits at an elevation of 3,834 feet (1,169 m) and encompasses 25.7 acres (10.4 ha).

The lake is approximately 1,800 feet (550 m) below the peak of the northern cliff of High Rock. The body of water can be viewed from High Rock Lookout Trail, and with caution, over the cliff near High Rock Lookout.

== Recreation ==
The lake is open to recreational fishing and has been stocked with rainbow trout by the Washington Department of Fish and Wildlife nine times between 2005 and 2025; in 2005, cutthroat trout were released. Eastern brook trout also populate the waters.

The lake is accessible via a hike of approximately 0.5 miles (0.80 km) on Big Creek Trail #252. Hikers pass two waterfalls, including Cora Falls, and traverse over Big Creek.

High Rock, from Cora Lake, 2026

Upper Cora Falls, 2026

Middle Cora Falls, 2026

== See also ==
- List of geographic features in Lewis County, Washington
- List of lakes in Washington
