= KBSG =

KBSG may refer to:

- KBSG (FM), a radio station (90.1 FM) licensed to serve Raymond, Washington, United States
- KWJZ-LP, a radio station (104.5 FM) licensed to Fall City, Washington, known as KBSG-LP from February 2009 to September 2010
- KIRO-FM, a radio station (97.3 FM) licensed to Tacoma, Washington, which held the call signs KBSG from February 1988 to July 1989 and KBSG-FM from July 1989 to August 2008
