= Garrard Creek =

Creek in Grays Harbor and Lewis counties, Washington state

- Garrard Creek (Dark Blue) and its tributaries.

- Location of the mouth of Garrard Creek in Oregon
- Etymology: James Garrard, early settler

Location
- Country: United States
- State: Washington
- County: Grays Harbor, Lewis

Physical characteristics
- Source: Doty Hills
  - location: Grays Harbor County and Lewis County, Washington
  - coordinates: 46°46′03″N 123°22′24″W
  - elevation: 1,380 ft (420 m)
- Mouth: Chehalis River
  - location: Chehalis River, Washington, United States
  - coordinates: 46°49′07″N 123°15′13″W
  - elevation: 60 ft (18 m)
- Basin size: 27.5 sq mi (71 km^{2})

Garrard Creek is a 12-mile (19.3 km) creek primarily in Grays Harbor County, Washington. The creek originates in the Doty Hills and is a tributary to the Chehalis River. The South Fork of Garrard Creek, 7.2-mile (11.6 km); Bloomquist Creek, 2.7-mile (4.3 km); and Kellogg Creek, 2.1-mile (3.4 km), add to its length.

The creek was originally called Barker Creek after Henry Barker, a native from Tennessee, who built a settlement in 1870 at the mouth of the creek. His stay in the settlement was short, and was transferred in 1874 to Oliver Brewer, a minister, and his family. In 1872, James Garrard and his family, settlers from Illinois, took a claim and became one of the first permanent residents in the valley.

Garrard Creek road is named after the creek with one end near the mouth of the creek and primarily running along the south fork. Brooklyn Road has one end near the intersection of Garrard Creek and the other end outside of the watershed. The two roads are the only major roads serving the Garrard Creek Valley.

== See also ==
- List of geographic features in Lewis County, Washington
