= List of geographic features in Lewis County, Washington =

The list of geographic features in Lewis County, Washington includes bodies of water and natural landforms. The list may also include geographic areas built, created, or modified by humans, including archaeological sites and parks.

== Bodies of water ==
=== Lakes ===
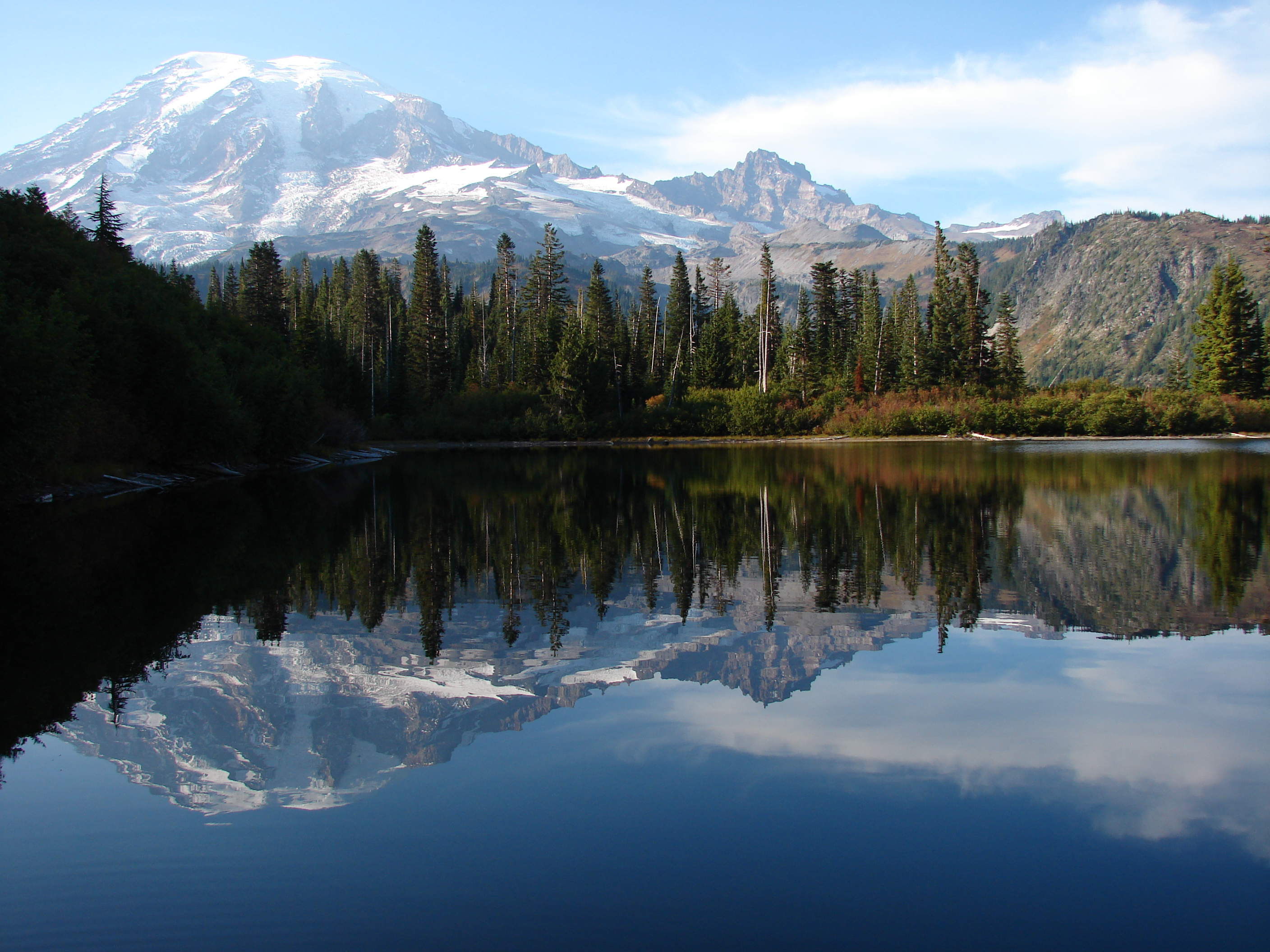
Bench Lake, 2015

Cora Lake, 2026

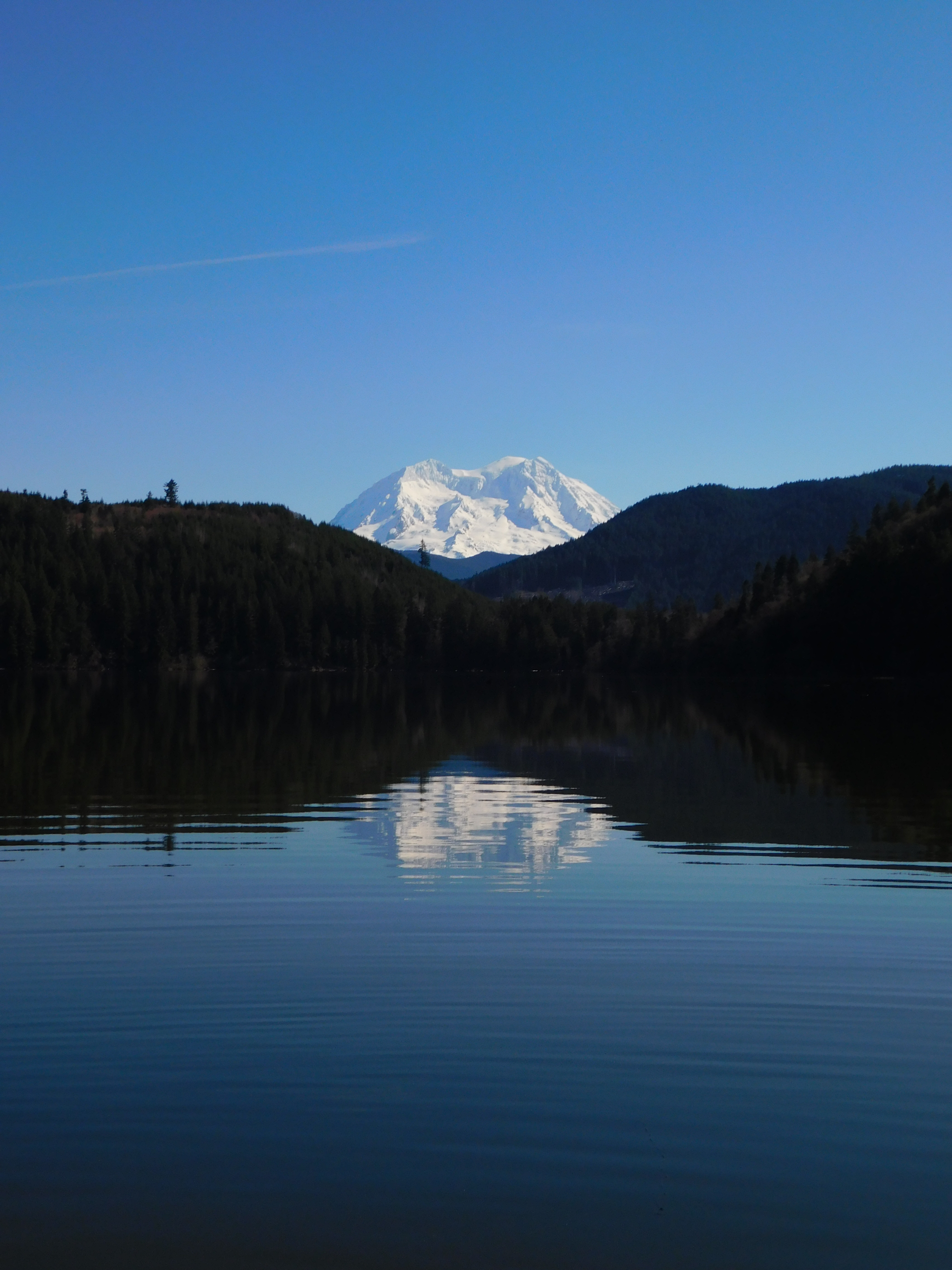
Mineral Lake, 2026

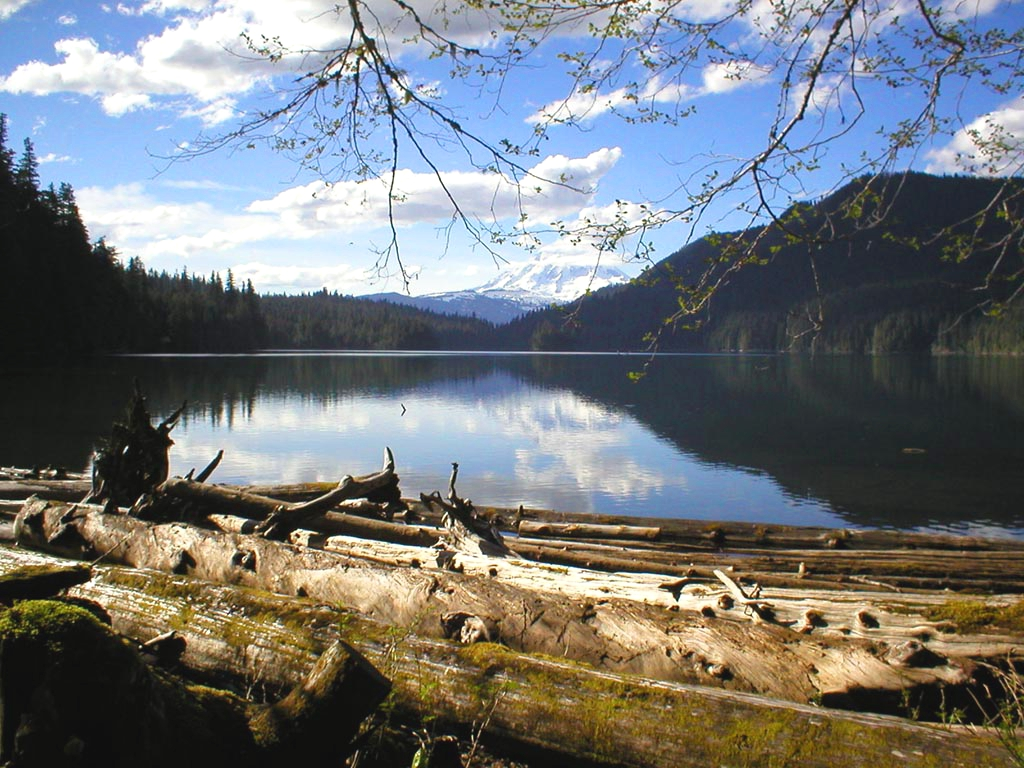
Packwood Lake, 2004
- Alder Lake
- Bench Lake
- Cora Lake
- Carlisle Lake
- Lake Mayfield
- Lake Scanewa
- Mineral Lake
- Newaukum Lake
- Packwood Lake
- Riffe Lake
- Snow Lake
- Walupt Lake

=== Rivers, creeks, or streams ===
- Chehalis River
- Cispus River
- Cowlitz River
- Garrard Creek
- Deschutes River
- East Fork Grays River
- Green River
- Lincoln Creek
- Newaukum River
- Nisqually River
- Ohanapecosh River
- Paradise River
- Skookumchuck River
- Thompson Creek
- Thurston Creek
- Tilton River

=== Waterfalls ===
- Camp Creek Falls
- Narada Falls
- Silver Falls
- Walupt Creek Falls

== Landforms ==
=== Hills, mountains, and ranges ===
High Rock, from Cora Lake, 2026

- Big Horn
- Boistfort Peak
- The Castle
- Chutla Peak
- Denman Peak
- Doty Hills
- Eagle Peak
- Foss Peak
- Goat Rocks
- High Rock
- Ives Peak
- Lane Peak
- Old Snowy Mountain
- Pinnacle Peak
- Plummer Peak
- Seminary Hill
- Stevens Peak
- Tatoosh Peak
- Tatoosh Range
- Unicorn Peak
- Wahpenayo Peak
- West Unicorn Peak
- Willapa Hills

=== Other ===
- Layser Cave
- McCall Glacier
- Ohanapecosh Formation
- Packwood Glacier
- Pinnacle Glacier
- White Pass

=== Parks and preserves ===
The following list contains parks, nature preserves or refuges, and trails under local, state, or federal management. For other local parks, conservation sites, and recreational hiking paths, please refer to community articles within Lewis County.

- Ike Kinswa State Park
- Jackson House State Park Heritage Site
- Lewis and Clark State Park
- Matilda N. Jackson State Park Heritage Site
- Mount Rainier National Park
- Pacific Crest Trail
- Rainbow Falls State Park
- Seminary Hill Natural Area
- Willapa Hills State Park
- Wonderland Trail

=== Prairies and valleys ===
- Cowlitz Prairie
- Hanaford Valley

== See also ==
- List of lakes of Washington
- List of mountain peaks of Washington
- List of rivers of Washington (state)
- Mount St. Helens National Volcanic Monument
