= KWJZ =

KWJZ may refer to:

- KWJZ-LP, a low-power radio station (107.3 FM) licensed to serve High Rock, Washington, United States
- KPNW-FM, a radio station (98.9 FM) licensed to serve Seattle, Washington, which held the call sign KWJZ from 1995 to 2011
