= Silver Falls =

Waterfall in Washington state, United States

Coordinates: 46.7526°N 121.5595°W

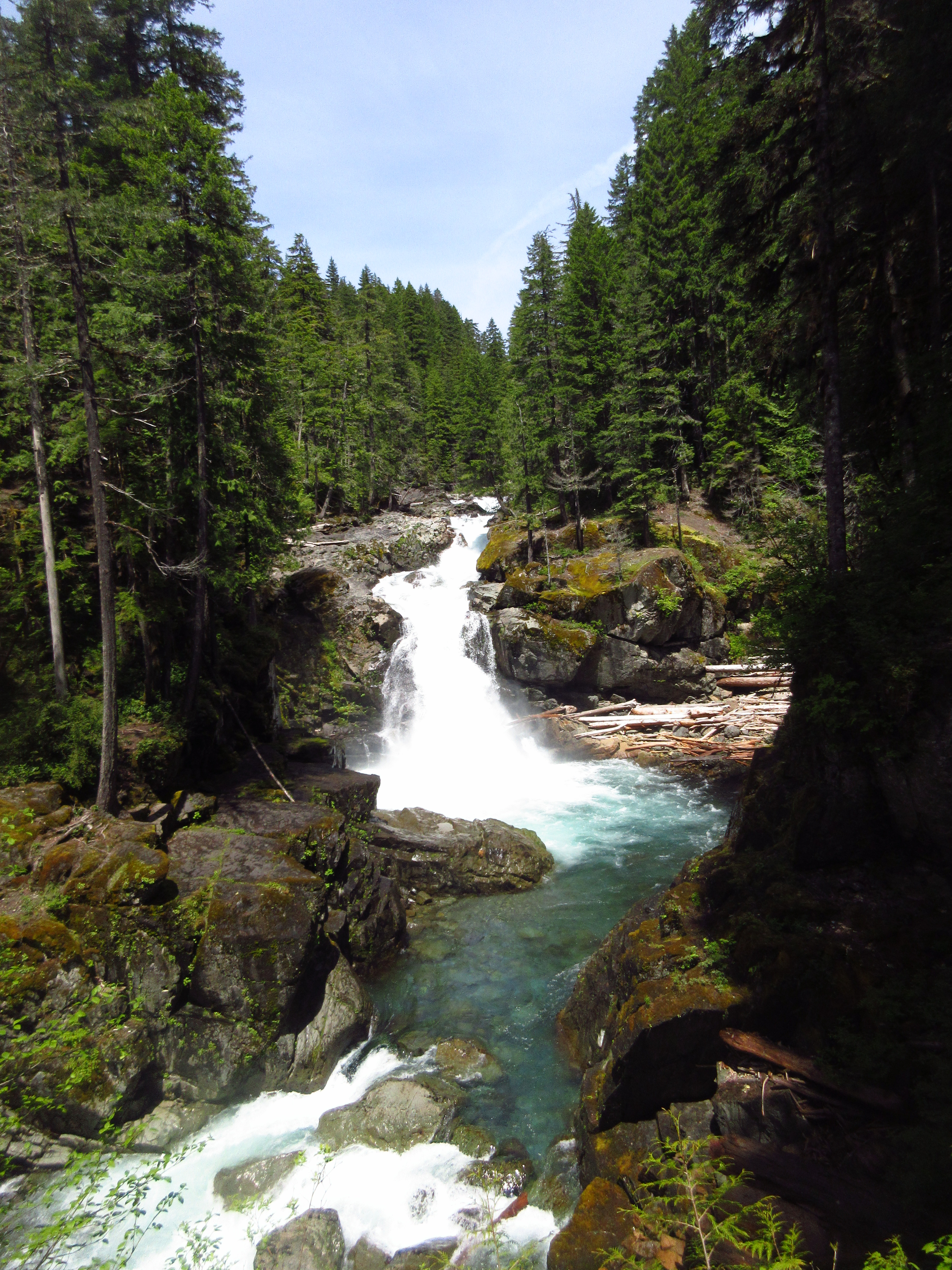
- Silver Falls, in Mount Rainier National Park
- Interactive map of Silver Falls
- Location: Mount Rainier National Park, Lewis County, Washington, United States
- Type: Tiered, punchbowl
- Total height: 95 feet (29 m)
- Number of drops: 4
- Watercourse: Ohanapecosh River

Silver Falls is a waterfall on the Ohanapecosh River located within Mount Rainier National Park in Washington.

== Description ==
Silver Falls is located on the Ohanapecosh River in Mount Rainier National Park. The river meanders through an old-growth forest. Beginning as smaller cascades through a small canyon, the final waterfall plunges approximately 40 feet (12 m) into a punchbowl that continues on into a gorge. (Note: The height of the final drop of the waterfall varies per source. The National Park Service lists the final drop to be 60 feet (18 m) tall. See sources throughout the page for the discrepancy.)

The waters are described as clear as the river is formed from snow melt rather than glacial runoff, which usually contains sediment. A footbridge over the river provides access to an overlook of the waterfall.

== Recreation ==
The Silver Falls Loop Trail is 2.7 miles (4.3 km) that loops around both sides of the Ohanapecosh River. Beginning at the Ohanapecosh Campground, or accessible via the Grove of the Patriarchs, the trail has an elevation gain of approximately 600 feet and considered "moderately strenuous". (Note: The National Park Service lists the Silver Falls Trail to be 2.7 miles (4.3 km) but other reports vary on the length of the path, often as 3 miles (4.8 km) or more. See sources throughout the page for the discrepancy.)

The trailhead at the campground was closed in 2026 due to maintenance at the site. The trail could still be hiked but not as a loop.

== Environment and wildlife ==
Wildlife recorded on the Silver Falls Trail, or at the waterfall, include deer and woodpeckers. Ferns and moss are prominent at the falls and the surrounding forest contains Douglas fir and Pacific silver fir, along with western alder, cedar, and hemlock.

== See also ==
- List of geographic features in Lewis County, Washington
