= Lincoln Creek (Chehalis River tributary) =

Stream in southwestern Washington, U.S.

- Interactive map of Creek location
- Etymology: Abraham Lincoln

Location
- Country: United States
- State: Washington
- County: Lewis County

Physical characteristics
- Source: Doty Hills
- Mouth
  - coordinates: 46°44′54″N 123°01′41″W

Basin features
- River system: Chehalis River
- Geographic Names Information System: 1506159

Lincoln Creek is a stream rising in Doty Hills in the U.S. state of Washington. It is a tributary of the Chehalis River.

Lincoln Creek was named in the 1860s after Abraham Lincoln by an admirer of the 16th president.

== See also ==
- List of geographic features in Lewis County, Washington
