= Thompson Creek (Skookumchuck River tributary) =

Creek in Lewis and Thurston County, Washington state

- Interactive map of Creek location
- Etymology: Unknown

Location
- Country: United States
- State: Washington
- County: Lewis and Thurston County

Physical characteristics
- Mouth
  - coordinates: 46°47′45.47″N 122°45′39.99″W

Basin features
- River system: Skookumchuck River
- Geographic Names Information System: 1527106

Thompson Creek is a stream in Lewis and Thurston counties in the U.S. state of Washington.It is a tributary to the Skookumchuck River. Its source is in Lewis County and its mouth is in Thurston County.

== History ==
The namesake of Thompson Creek has not been identified.

Funding to improve the floodplain and ecosystem of Thompson Creek near the county border was granted in 2025 by the Washington State Salmon Recovery Funding Board and the Puget Sound Partnership. Totaling over $250,000, the efforts also include the planting of native species and a restoration of spawning grounds for Coho salmon and steelhead trout.

== See also ==
- List of geographic features in Lewis County, Washington
- List of geographic features in Thurston County, Washington
