= Seminary Hill Natural Area =

Nature preserve in Centralia, Washington

- Dry Park
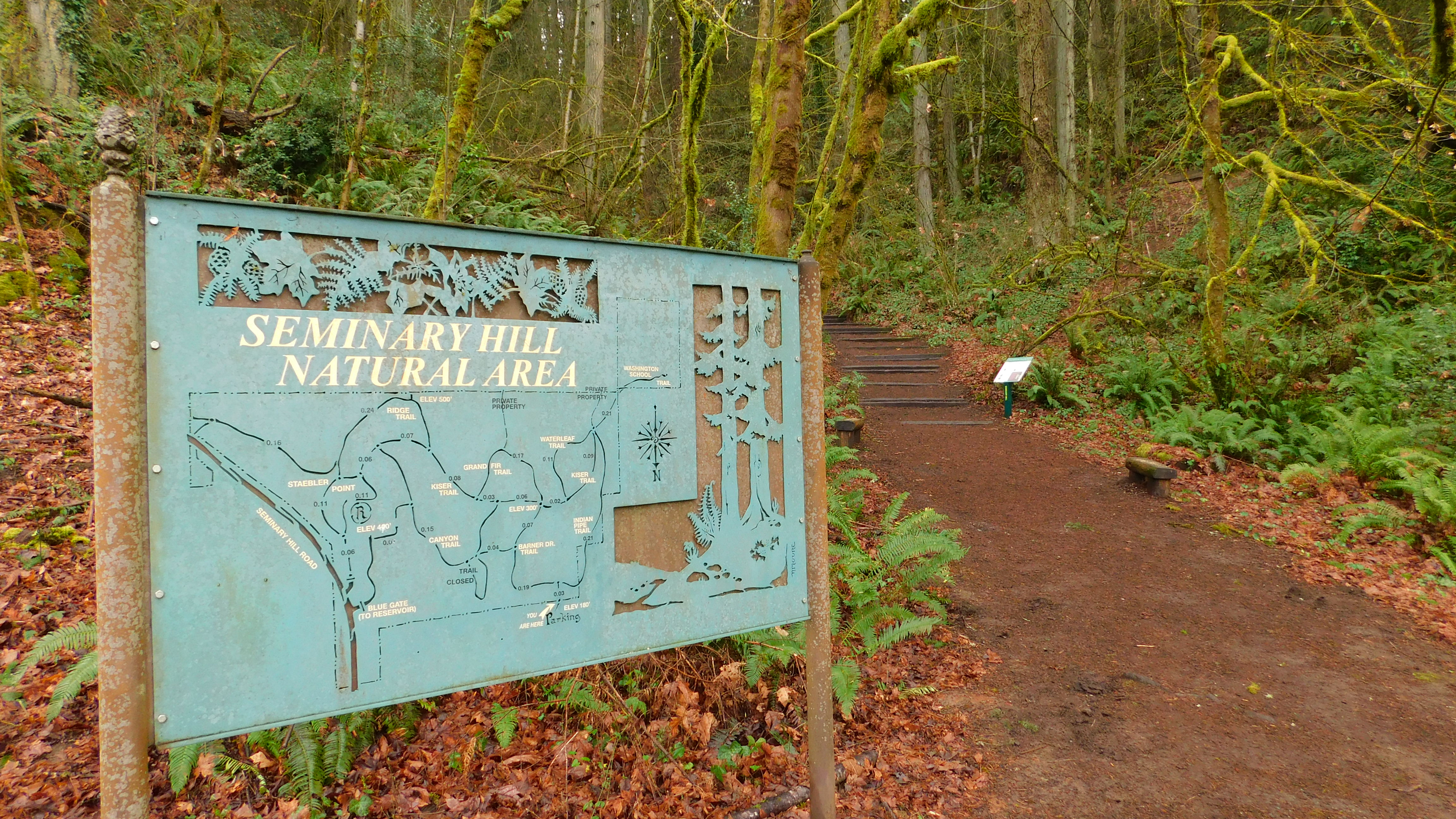
- Seminary Hill Natural Area, trail map, 2026
- Interactive map of Seminary Hill Natural Area
- Type: Nature preserve
- Location: 902 East Locust Street, Centralia, Washington
- Coordinates: 46°42′36″N 122°56′42″W
- Area: 71 acres (29 ha)
- Elevation: 554 ft (169 m)
- Designated: 1981
- Founder: Friends of Seminary Hill Natural Area
- Owner: City of Centralia
- Status: Open
- Camp sites: None
- Hiking trails: 2.25 mi (3.62 km)
- Terrain: Flat to moderate inclines, cliffs
- Habitats: Second growth forest
- Water: Reservoir
- Parking: Parking lot
- Facilities: Picnic shelter

Seminary Hill Natural Area is a 71.0-acre (28.7 ha) nature preserve and park in Centralia, Washington. The site is situated on Seminary Hill, a more than 500 foot (150 m)-tall landform that is also the name of a neighborhood located upon the terrain.

The area was logged during the 19th century and became home to a divinity school known as Grace Seminary. The school was constructed during the late 1880s and opened in 1890. The seminary struggled financially and closed multiple times; by 1905 the building was converted into a hospital, serving as such until approximately 1920. The structure was mostly abandoned, and due to neglect, was required to be razed in the 1930s. Afterwards, the grounds became the location of a National Guard Armory; a golf course was constructed on the surrounding land.

The hill has been home to the city's reservoir system since the early 20th century. Members of the International Workers of the World (IWW) used Seminary Hill as an entrenched position during the Centralia Tragedy in 1919.

The area became a city park known as Seminary Hill Park, or Dry Park, in the 1930s after the Works Progress Administration began constructing a trail system throughout the forested site. By the late 1970s as the city failed to patrol the site, the park had fallen into disrepair, often used as a garage dumping ground. By 1980, local residents formed a non-profit group known as the Friends of Seminary Hill Natural Area (FSHNA) with the intent to preserve the hill and its forest and park setting. The efforts led to the official declaration by the city to list the site as Seminary Hill Natural Area in 1981.

In 1991, the two reservoirs located in the natural area collapsed due to erosion. No injuries or deaths were reported; damages were limited despite the flood and mudslide. The reservoir was rebuilt and became operational in 1994.

The FSHNA manages and maintains the park, which was expanded to its present-day size in 2000. The volunteer organization holds various trail walks for educational purposes. The preserve features over 2 miles (3.2 km) of hiking paths through a second growth forest which contains approximately 400 species of flora.

== Background ==
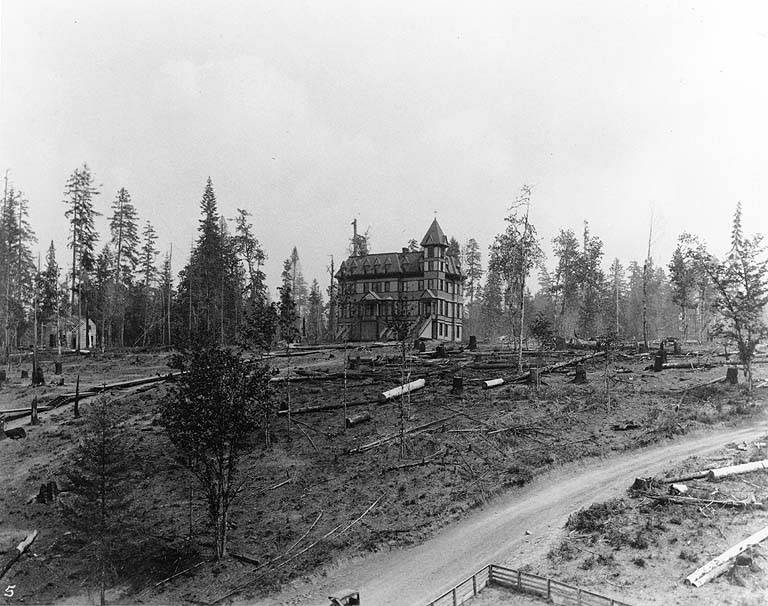
Grace Seminary, August 1890

=== Early history of Seminary Hill ===
The hill, located east of the Centralia Downtown Historic District, was initially listed on maps by the 1840s and first logged approximately in the mid-1860s.

Organized in 1884, the Northwest Convention of Missionary Baptists (NCMB) began efforts to purchase a plot of land on the hill, completing the sale in 1886. Historical reporting on the early efforts of the NCMB mention that a Baptist church or seminary had either already been constructed or was in the process of being built by another church organization upon Seminary Hill by 1885.

In 1889, the organization proposed to the city of Centralia the build of a divinity school in exchange for deeded land and $10,000 (equivalent to $358,333 in 2025) for construction costs. The city agreed and the founder of Centralia, George Washington, is reported to have donated the funds for the construction of the seminary. (Note: The amount that George Washington donated for the seminary is sometimes recorded as $1,000 (equivalent to $35,833 in 2025) but often as the full amount of $10,000 (equivalent to $358,333 in 2025).)

Known as Grace Seminary, the facility became a well-known landmark in the community, and the city was referred to as "that town with the great big building on top of a hill". Passengers on Northern Pacific Railway trains were noted to have "stretched their necks" to view the building, (Note: As the hill was clear cut during the late 19th and early 20th century, the seminary was also noted to be readily viewable to passing trains.) wondering "about its origin and purpose".

The Gothic architecture-style seminary was founded by Reverend Mary C. Jones. Jane and William F. Bryan, a Black couple residing in Centralia, donated 6 acres (2.4 ha) of the 11-acre (4.5 ha) grounds and attempted to sell the remaining portion to the seminary for $300 (equivalent to $10,750 in 2025). The missionary organization failed to raise the funds but the debt was undertaken by a local judge, R.S. Greene. The seminary was named after his wife, Grace.

The wooden, four-story seminary, from which the park is named, was completed and furnished without debt in 1890 for $17,000 (equivalent to $609,167 in 2025). A dedication ceremony was held on June 12, 1890, which included hymnal performances from a choir of parishioners from across the city. A biblical passage was read that symbolized the seminary's educational purpose and location "from the highest point of the city". The opening of the school included four staff members, who roomed at the seminary, and classes were provided for drawing, music, and printing.

Access to the school was accorded by horse and buggy up a steep, planked pathway. The schoolhouse contained a music room and classrooms to educate up to 36 students who could be boarded at the seminary. The basement, or bottom floor, contained two bathrooms, a dining room, kitchen, laundry room, and a "wood room". The interior was noted to be detailed in oiled and varnished "natural" wood.

Despite reports that the school "attracted students from throughout the Northwest", the seminary struggled financially, closing years later. (Note: The seminary may have been used as a preparatory school in the 1890s after the divinity facility began experiencing financial difficulties.) The seminary was temporarily reopened in 1900 after receiving a new endowment; the school once again closed in a few years, perhaps in 1905, after continuing "lack of support" and difficulties in accessibility. During the seminary's closures, it may have been briefly used as a residential home and for a time, was placed on the city's tax roll.

The seminary was converted into a hospital after it was purchased in August 1905 by local doctor, J.H. Dumon. Planned to be the "largest and most up-to-date" healthcare facility between Portland and Seattle, the revamp of the school and 8-acre (3.2 ha) parcel was expected to cost $5,000 (equivalent to $179,167 in 2025) and include a power plant for the lighting system, steam heat, and an ambulance service. (Note: The Dumon hospital is considered to be the first general hospital in Centralia.)

The structure became known as the Centralia General Hospital by 1911, where the building and acreage were sold that April for $25,000 (equivalent to $863,839 in 2025). A group of twenty sawmills in Southwest Washington purchased the hospital to provide healthcare for their employees. An elevator was added to the east side of the seminary building and a new public hospital was initiated in July 1918; begun under incorporation, two of the main investors of the $15,000 (equivalent to $321,073 in 2025) effort were local doctors, Lee Scace and W.A. Smith. (Note: The hospitals at the seminary were described as "not very satisfactory".)

The hospital closed and the building was mostly abandoned, considered "idle" since approximately 1920. Falling into disrepair, the porches were removed, and the structure was proposed for demolition in July 1930 as it was considered a fire hazard. Those who volunteered to undertake the demolition were allowed to keep any salvageable lumber. By September of that year, most of the building had been removed. All that remained was the elevator shaft and a few sections of the lower floor. The surviving portions were eventually torn down in 1938. (Note: Sources vary on the reasons, as well as the year, the seminary school was demolished. Reports mention the building razed at some point in the 1920s or that the seminary was torn down due to weather and neglect. See sources throughout the article for the discrepancies.) Historical recollections often mention that the structure was set on fire as part of the removal, but a lack of archaeological evidence does not support the account. The grounds became the site of the Centralia Armory, a National Guard base. By 1970, no trace of Grace Seminary could be found.

Logging and the harvest of timber on the hill began in 1900. The grounds were later purchased that decade by the city, constructing two concrete reservoirs during the 1910s. In 1919, Governor Louis F. Hart announced that that the summit of Seminary Hill was to be the location of a newly constructed normal school, or state college. Though money was appropriated by the Washington State Legislature in 1921, the bill was vetoed by Governor Louis F. Hart, leaving little money to the city to build a college. As attempts to repeal the veto were ongoing, planning continued into 1923. The legislature during the time approved and funded the purchase of additional acreage on the hill for the school but the repeal failed. The state "disposed of the land" on Seminary Hill that was purchased or donated for the college, but no deed was filed or transferred. The confusion, which led to decades of Centralia and Washington state legislative difficulties regarding attempted city improvements on the hillside, was not fully corrected until the title was properly cleared in 1963. (Note: Attempts were made to transfer the land for the failed normal school construction back to the city in February 1935. A bill was filed with a committee in the state legislature. By December of that year, a portion of the acreage on Seminary Hill, outside the natural area, was deeded back to Centralia and used for the construction of the Armory Golf Course.)

Seminary Hill was used in an advertising campaign of a Rhode Island Oldsmobile dealership in 1923. The "power of the Oldsmobile Four engine" was noted to shatter hill climbing records for automobiles, from "Corey Hill at Boston to Seminary Hill" in Centralia. The steepness and terrain of the hill was also used to promote an Oakland 8 automobile in 1930. Reaching speeds up to 25 miles per hour, the vehicle, driven by Centralia's police chief, made the trip up the landform "apparently without effort".

=== Centralia Tragedy ===
During the events of the Centralia Tragedy, Seminary Hill was used as a fallback and sniper position for at least three members of the International Workers of the World (IWW). An IWW member, Loren Roberts, admitted in a confession that he and two other men were part of the group and all were armed. The name of one of the men was unknown to him and the other was known as Loughtenoff, who went under the alias, Hansen. The men were ordered to the hill by Wesley Everest and they were to return fire if the men heard the sound of gunshots.

The group climbed the hill to their positions by one o'clock that afternoon. Allegedly, the unnamed Wobbly (Note: The term "Wobbly" or "Wobblies" are non-pejorative nickname for members of the Industrial Workers of the World (IWW). The origin of the moniker remains uncertain. See the IWW article for more information.) was Eugene Barnett, who was armed with a rifle and positioned approximately 500 yards (1,500 ft) away from the city's downtown core; (Note: The distance from the hill to Centralia's downtown during the Centralia Tragedy investigation mention a variety of measurements, often as approximately 1,000 feet (300 m) or as 0.25 miles (0.40 km). The distance was specifically listed at 1,184 feet (361 m) during testimony in 1920. See sources throughout the section.) Barnett is credited with shooting and killing American Legionnaire Warren Grimm, who died instantly. Additional gunfire from the entrenched IWW position on the hill towards other Legionnaires during the event was reported. Although Roberts admitted to firing five shots, he mentioned in the same confession that he "took no part in the shooting". At the end of the incident, the men immediately left their positions, reported as approximately 125 feet (38 m) southwest of the reservoir on the hill, with Roberts hiding in a field of brush across from his home; the other two IWW members were reported to abscond with their firearms to a shack owned by Hansen in Hanaford Valley. Twelve shell casings during the investigation of the tragedy were found on the hill. (Note: Early reports of the Centralia Tragedy mentioned that four rifle cartridges were found on Seminary Hill.)

=== Reservoirs ===
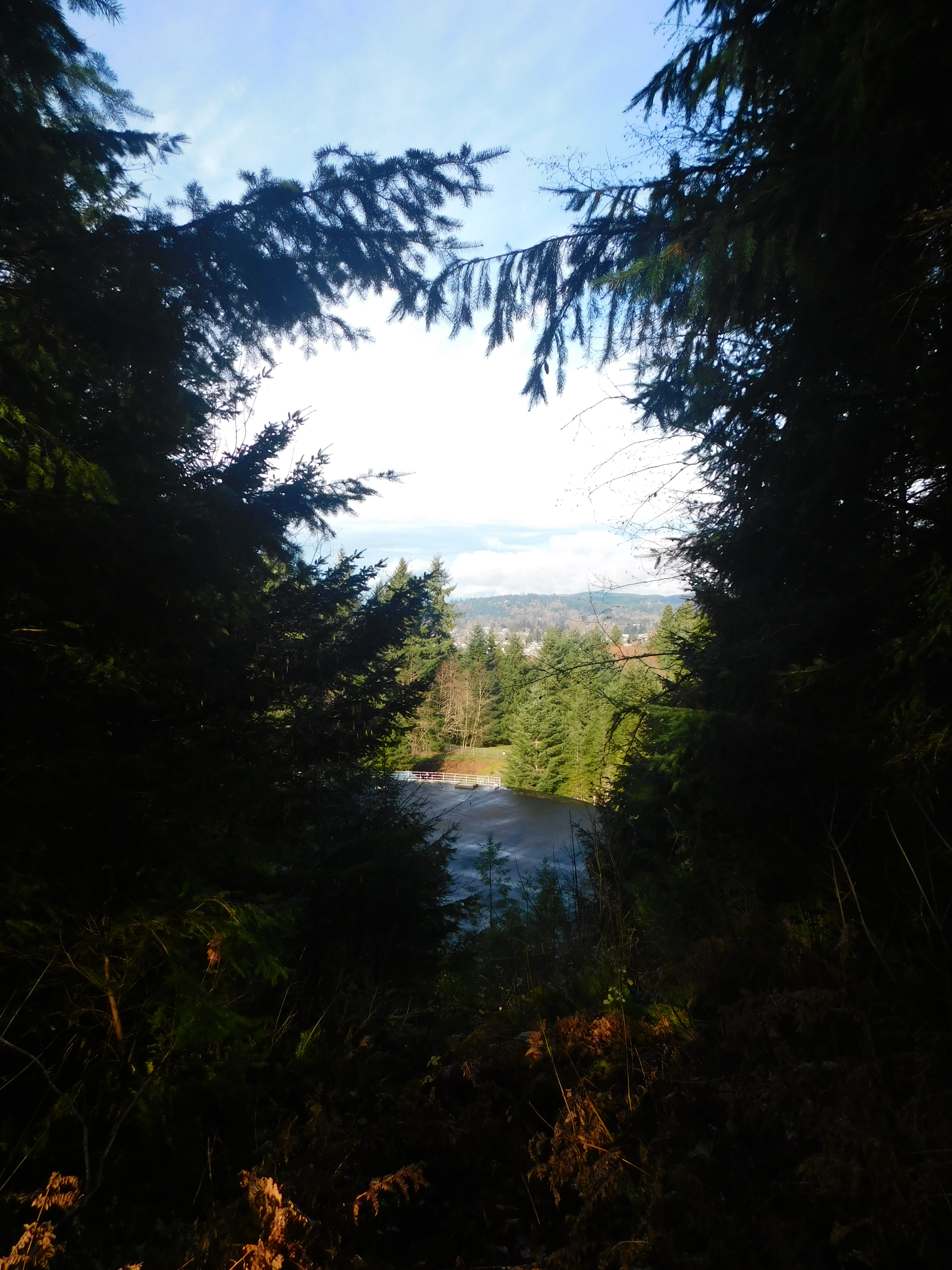
Reservoir, 2026

An embankment reservoir owned by the Centralia Water Company existed upon the hill by 1904. Efforts to enlarge the structure, to "endeavor to comply with the demands of the city", began in June 1904. The following year, the reservoir was found to be in "filthy condition" after concerns over foul-smelling, discolored water from residential homes. Often found to be near empty, broken fences were also noted, which allowed boys access to swim in the containment area. Poor conditions continued into 1911, requiring a boil-water advisory after the waters were inundated with insects and possible bacterial growth that was suspected to be a leading cause of an increase in cholera and typhus cases within the city.

The water company built a 500,000 US gallons (1,900,000 L; 420,000 imp gal) reservoir next to the existing retention pond in 1909 and the combined gravity-fed water supply of 700,000 US gallons (2,600,000 L; 580,000 imp gal), considered in perfect condition the following year, was kept "ample" after 25 wells were dug. A new reservoir was built in 1914 and was reported to be operational by the end of the year. (Note: The 1914 reservoir was first filled with water in January 1915.)

The city began the construction of "another" reservoir, capable of holding 1 million US gallons (3.8 Ml), in 1920; the new basin was meant to hold water for use during fires. The construction of a 5 million US gallons (19 Ml) reservoir, to be located next to the 1920 retention structure, was announced in July 1925 and was initially estimated to cost $100,000 (equivalent to $1,835,863 in 2025). Construction began the following month under contractor, Frank Knowles, with a reduced cost of $70,000 (equivalent to $1,285,104 in 2025). By October, the Centralia Citizen's Committee began to investigate the purchase price of the land for the reservoir, the argument being that "too much money was paid" and the amount of land needed for the project to be excessive.

Two reservoirs were built, each approximately 30 feet (9.1 m) deep. In 1934, to provide additional sources of water for Centralia, wells were dug on Seminary Hill. At a depth of 800 feet (240 m), the boring attempt struck a 7 foot (2.1 m)-thick vein of lignite coal. After 1000 feet, the effort was halted after no water was found.

During the early morning of October 5, 1991, the two mid-1920s reservoirs located in the natural area failed. The smaller basin collapsed first, (Note: During the 1991 reservoir failure, the smaller containment initially cracked, the water seeping with such force that a gap of 50 feet (15 m) occurred within minutes.) the concrete and rebar falling down the hillside. The second reservoir, located 20 feet (6.1 m) above, drained over the course of two to three hours due to a large crack. In total, 8 million US gallons (30 Ml) flowed out of the two reservoirs into the neighborhoods below the hill. More than a dozen homes suffered damages, including one house that became detached from its foundation, (Note: Immediate reports stated that between three to six homes were destroyed during the 1991 reservoir collapse.) and several hundred residents were temporarily evacuated.

Residents in the surrounding neighborhood immediately began to alert emergency officials when the breech, reported to sound like a "747 going off", was first noted. The incident, which began at approximately 10:15 A.M. local time, was declared over by around 3 P.M.; residents were allowed to return to their homes that afternoon.

Mud, debris, and large rocks inundated local streets encompassing 15 blocks; the floodwaters and mudslide stopped a few blocks from the downtown district. No vehicle was reported to have suffered major damage. A city park was destroyed but no deaths or injuries were reported.

The reservoirs, the main source for drinking water in Centralia, failed due to erosion which led to the sagging of soil underneath the retention area. There was no prior warning that the reservoirs were about to fail; the basins had been drained a month before and received regular maintenance and inspection every three months. The next day, the water supply was restored using backup sources and efforts were begun to clear 100,000 cubic yards (76,000 m^{3}) of mud and debris.

A new reservoir, with a capacity of 4.5 million US gallons (17 Ml), was constructed in the natural area for $1,872,000 (equivalent to $4,066,367 in 2025) and was considered complete by February 1994.

=== First park ===
The Works Progress Administration (WPA) constructed a system of bridle paths on the hill during the 1930s; (Note: News articles from the 1930s mention the Works Progress Administration (WPA) efforts in creating a trail system in the 1930s but up to 2005, the Friends of Seminary Hill Natural Area noted that they were unable to verify the participation of the WPA.) visitors and residents began using the hill for recreational purposes. The site was dedicated as a city park on April 25, 1937. The recreation area was constructed by the WPA. The new park was given the moniker, Seminary Hill Park, and originally encompassed 63 acres (25 ha). The opening ceremony was spearheaded by the Centralia Girl Scouts, with an "assist" from the city's Boy Scouts and Campfire Girls groups.

The area was used for military exercises after the build of the armory, as well as an official Girl Scout camp beginning in 1951; the camp site was given the name, Valley View, after a contest was held to choose a moniker.

The park also became known as "Dry Park". Legally, the recreation site was under the direction of the city's water department due to the location of the reservoirs within the park. By 1980, as the city waned in patrolling the hill, the park had been noted to have been used as an illegal garbage ground for several years; refuse included large appliances, furniture, and a truck.

== History ==
=== Formation of Seminary Hill Natural Area ===
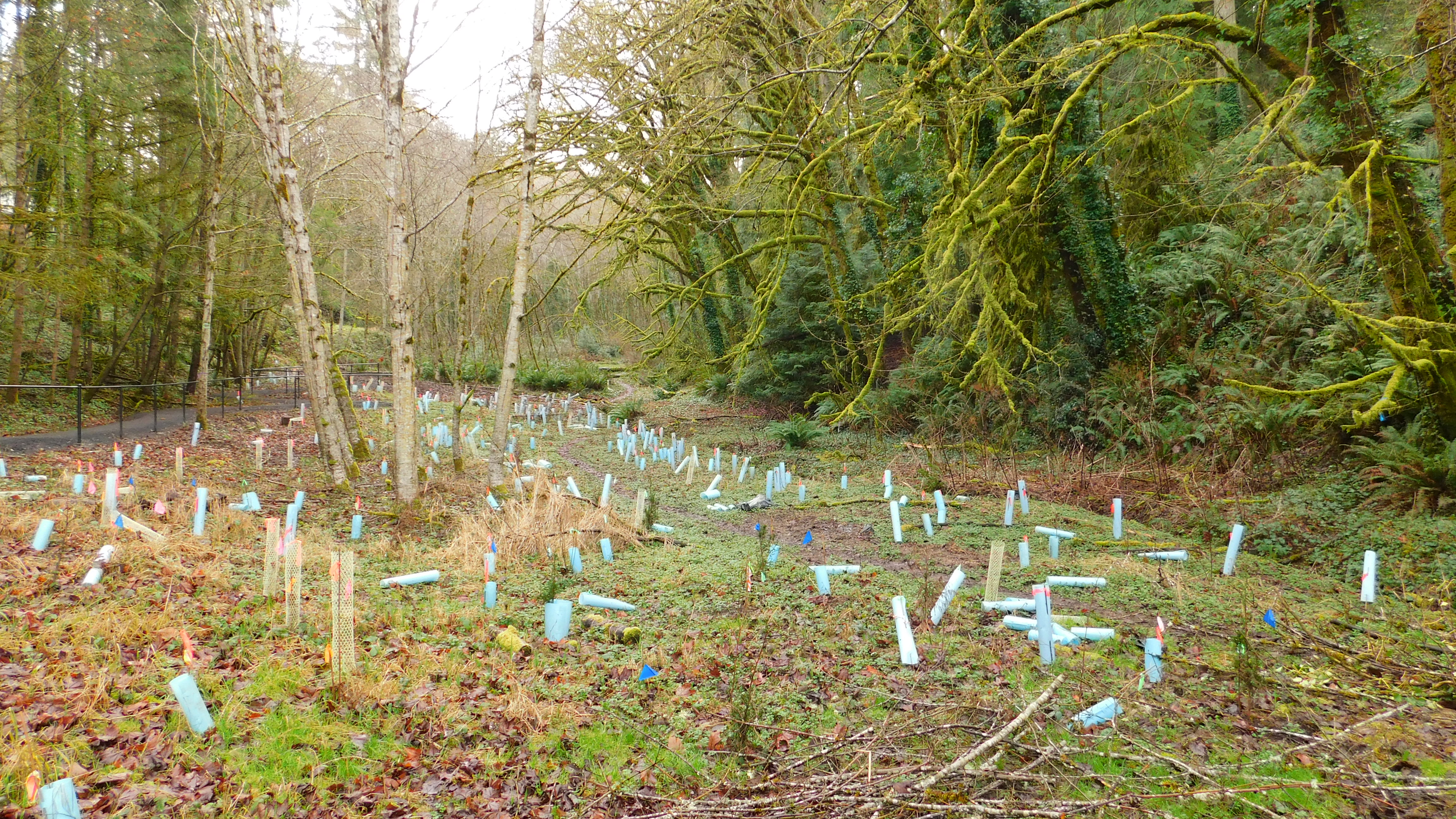
Restoration and accessible path, 2026

In the late 1970s, a 12-member group of Centralians led an early effort to protect Dry Park. The group's focus was to potentially create an official, permanent recreation site upon the hill. The city council passed a non-binding resolution to provide protection of the hill during this time.

By 1980, the city of Centralia owned 65 acres (26 ha) of the northern portion of the hill. The unkempt landform was proposed that same year to be logged with the revenue meant to help offset costs of the reservoir system. The mayor at the time, Bill Moeller, was against the timber harvest proposal, stating that it "went against my grain". On March 31, 1980, two leaders of a local Girl Scout troop, Chloe Palmer and Stellajoe Staebler, formed a non-profit organization, known as Friends of the Seminary Hill Natural Area (FSHNA), to save the forested park. The group, which included such patrons as Carol and Robert Godsey, Rufus Kiser, and George Staebler, volunteered in gathering the history of the hill as well as repairing the existing trail system, which included damages from motorcycle use. According to Stellajoe Staebler, "women did the phone calls and letters", while most of the physical labor was undertaken by the men in the FSHNA.

On May 11, 1980, the association launched an ordinance petition, requesting the city protect Seminary Hill as a natural park. With 2,000 signatures collected, the area was officially protected as a natural area on May 17, 1981. (Note: The official year of the natural area designation is sometimes reported as taking place in 1982 although a majority of sources mention May 17, 1981, explicitly. See sources throughout the article for the discrepancy.) George Staebler, an official with Weyerhaeuser and an influential resident of Centralia, had originally agreed with logging the hill. Stellajoe, his wife, was noted to have "disagreed" and George "changed his opinion", which led to two Centralia city council members changing their votes in favor of the preserve. As part of the agreement to designate the park, the city asked the Friends of the Seminary Hill Natural Area group to remain in force, granting the organization the right to maintain and patrol the preserve in "any way they could".

By 1989, the southern face of the hill remained in private ownership and was logged beginning that year and into the 1990s; lacking cover from winds, several trees in the city-owned portion were blown down. After the reservoir collapse in 1991, funding for reconstruction also helped pay for improvements to the main entrance to the park, which included new landscaping, a security gate, an entrance sign, and a gravel parking lot.

=== 21st century ===
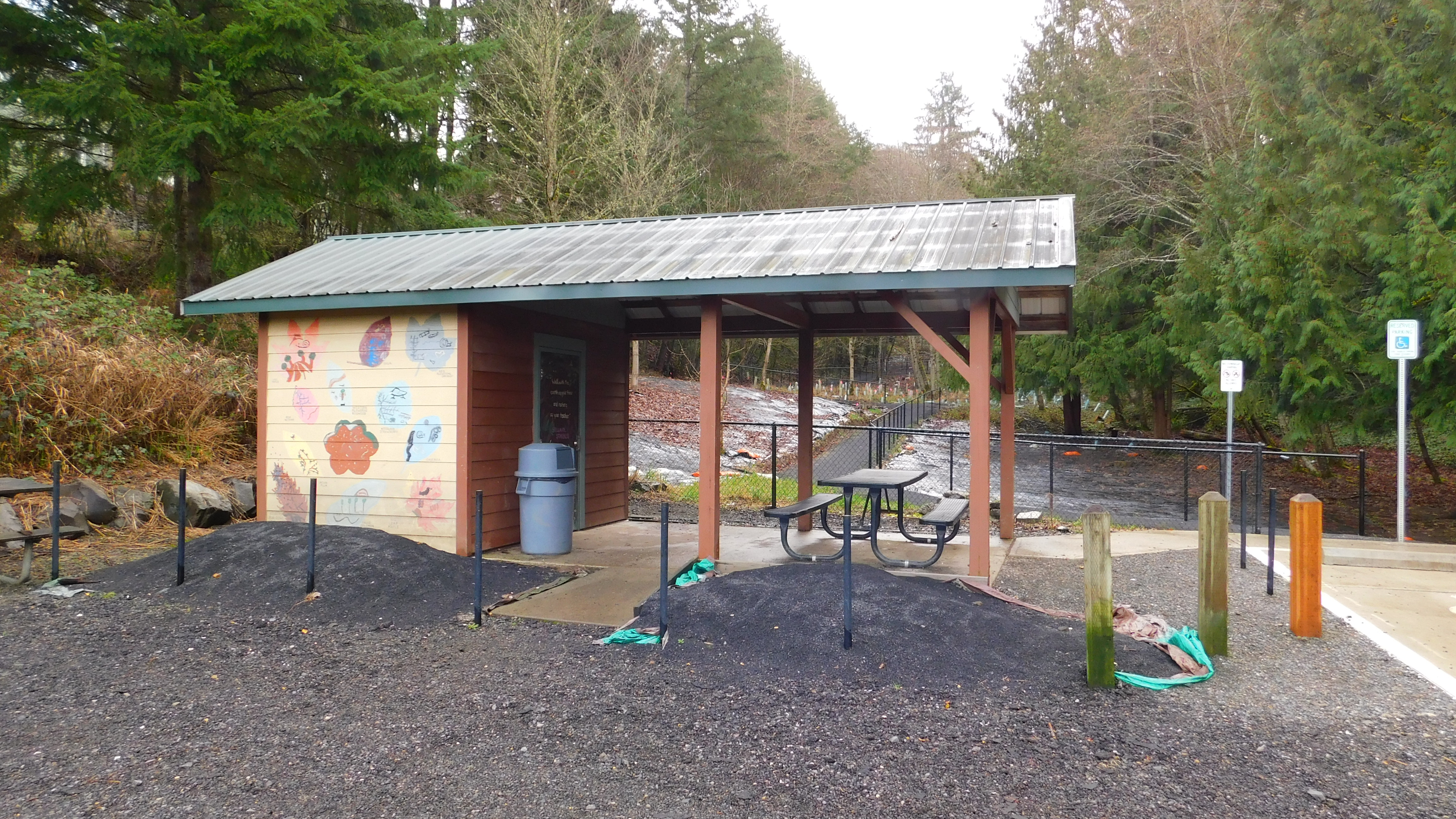
Stellajoe's Picnic Haven, 2026

In 2000, three parcels were donated to Seminary Hill Natural Area, increasing the acreage to over 70 acres (28 ha). A powder coat, steel sign created by Shelton artist, Nancy Moore, was installed at the main trail entrance in June 2003. The sign features a trail map, along with elevation gains, within the preserve. The effort was part of a donation in honor of Irene Jones who had been a member of the FSHNA since near its formation. The trail sign was formally dedicated in November 2003.

After an anonymous donation in 2015, the effort to construct a permanent picnic shelter was begun. Measuring 12 ft × 24 ft (3.7 m × 7.3 m), the fire-resistant structure contains a locked shed portion and a covered patio area under a metal roof. A covered bicycle rack was originally part of the plans. The donor was later announced to have been Stellajoe Staebler, who originally proposed the need for a shelter. Her gift of $5,000 was considered to be the largest of the donations for the project which was officially dedicated in June 2016. Named in her honor, the structure was given the moniker, "Stellajoe's Picnic Haven".

During the construction of a parking lot at the National Guard Armory between late 2017 and early 2018, several artifacts were discovered which included writing materials from Grace Seminary and medical equipment from Centralia General Hospital. Additional finds included bricks and iron of the original structure, as well as various ceramics and glass, such as tea cups and bottles. The archaeological finds were sent to the Washington State Department of Archaeology and Historic Preservation for analysis, with some pieces further studied at the Burke Museum and the University of Idaho. Several items were placed in a gallery at the Lewis County Historical Museum. The Grace Seminary Exhibit was unveiled in October 2019.

=== Founders and contributors of Seminary Hill Natural Area ===
Robert Godsey, who had served as a math teacher and department head at Centralia College for over 30 years, received the honor of having a classroom at the school named after him in 2014. Carol Godsey, also known as Sandy, died in March 2017. Sandy served as president of the Friends of Seminary Hill Natural Area between 1993 and 2014, considered the longest such tenure at the position as of 2017.

Rufus Kiser, a botanist who once taught at Green Hill School and Centralia College, died from a heart attack on the trail in June 1995. Before his death, he had completed a book detailing plants within Seminary Hill, approximately 350 attributed to his discovery. His book, Walking With Rufus, (Note: An alternate title of Rufus Kiser's book is, Walking with Rufus on Seminary Hill.) which was previously printed as monthly articles in The Daily Chronicle newspaper during 1978, was posthumously published in book form in 1995. The effort, which began with a sold-out run of 1,000 copies, was funded by a grant from the FSHNA. A trail in the preserve was later named in his memory and the Centralia College KNOLL, known also as the Kiser Natural Outdoor Learning Lab, was dedicated in 2012 and named in his honor.

Seminary Hill became the resting place for the ashes William "Bill" Moeller. The longtime Centralia resident and public servant died in 2024 at the age of 96. Moeller requested the disbursement of his ashes at the park due to his love of the area.

Chloe Palmer died in November 2023. Palmer specialized in education and as a teacher and coach for various girls sports at the high school and collegiate level. In the 1970s, she filed two Title IX grievances against Centralia College. Palmer served on various committees and boards in Centralia, as well as charitable organizations and Girl Scout groups. She was awarded Centralia's Business Woman of the Year in 1986.

George Staebler began working for Weyerhaeuser in 1957 and became the company's Director of Forestry Research; he managed Weyerhaeuser's forestry lab in Centralia. George died in 1995. Stellajoe Staebler died in April 2018 at the age of 101. Her death was on the same day as the annual, Earth Day cleanup event held at the preserve.

== Geography ==
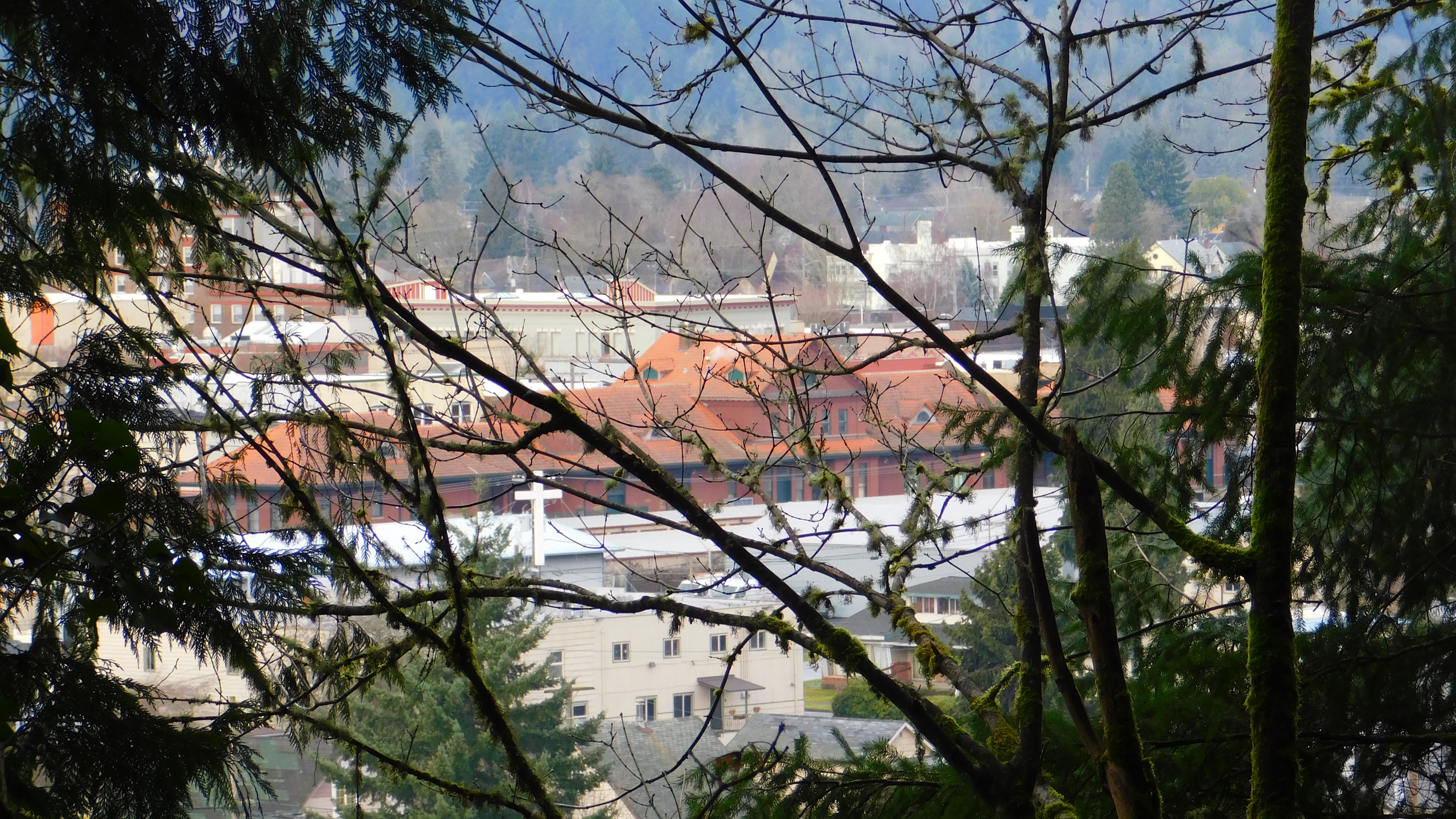
View, Centralia Union Depot, 2026

Seminary Hill is listed as a domed-shaped landform reaching as high as 590 feet (180 m). The hill stands over a flood plain in Centralia, Washington. The Geographic Names Information System (GNIS) lists the summit of the hill within the natural area to be 554 feet (169 m).

The hill is home to a 71.0-acre (28.7 ha) nature preserve that contains a trail system through mixed forest with views of the Chehalis River Valley; the landform outside the park is also known as a neighborhood of the same name. The site's southern boundary faces Salzer Valley and the Centralia Downtown Historic District is to the west. The parking lot and trailhead is located at the Barner Drive entrance, the main access point to the preserve.

=== Armory Hills Golf Course ===
North of the protected area was once home to the Armory Hills Golf Course. Construction of the site began in December 1935 under the Works Progress Administration (WPA). The 55-acre (22 ha) course officially opened on May 15, 1938.

By 1994, Centralia owned eight of the holes of the nine-hole course. The city leased their portion of the site, as well as facilities, to a partnership business which owned the remaining section of the course. With ongoing contractual, financial, and maintenance difficulties between owners and the city, attempts were made to sell the course beginning in 1994, and the site was finally closed by the end of 2003. The Centralia City Council twice attempted to declare the course as surplus in 2015 and 2016. The golf course was rezoned for residential use in 2022 and a portion of the original grounds were authorized to be part of a housing development in 2024.

=== National Guard Armory ===
The Public Works Administration (PWA) was approved by the state to begin construction of a National Guard armory in August 1937. The armory was placed on the hill atop the previous site of Grace Seminary, north and outside the boundaries of the natural area. The project was initially estimated to cost $75,000 (equivalent to $1,679,687 in 2025). The armory, designed by Day (D.W.) Hilborn of Vancouver, was home to Centralia's 41st Tank Company and the headquarters for the division's special troops. The three-floor concrete building included a bottom level garage and a main floor drill room. The top story was used as office space and as a balcony for visitors. The 93 ft × 133 ft (28 m × 41 m) armory was dedicated on August 5, 1938.

== Recreation and features ==
The main entrance and trailhead is located on East Locust Street and Barner Drive. Secondary trailheads were noted to be located near the reservoir, as well as Washington Elementary School, in the late 1990s. Horseback riding was banned soon after the formation of the natural area, and as of 2024, leashed dogs are allowed but biking and camping are forbidden. No fees are required to access or park at the natural area. Along with a prohibition on alcohol, the hiking paths are also listed as "Tabacco Free" trails.

The Friends of Seminary Hill Natural Area provides educational trail walks, such as studies of birds and wildflowers, during the year. Outdoor classes for Centralia College are held at the park. Various local businesses, groups, and children's organizations use the park for educational or wellness uses.

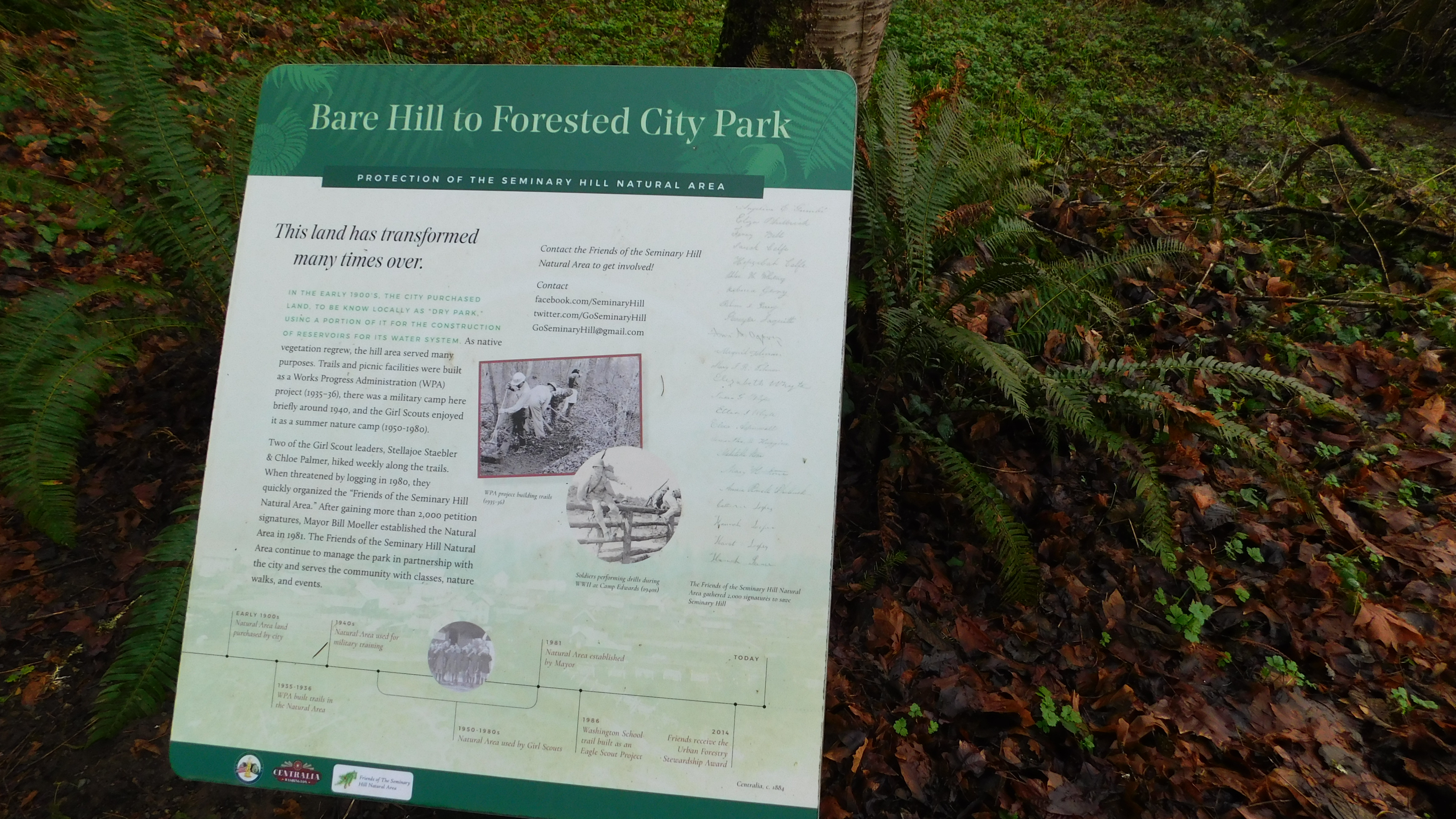
Interpretive panel, park history, 2026

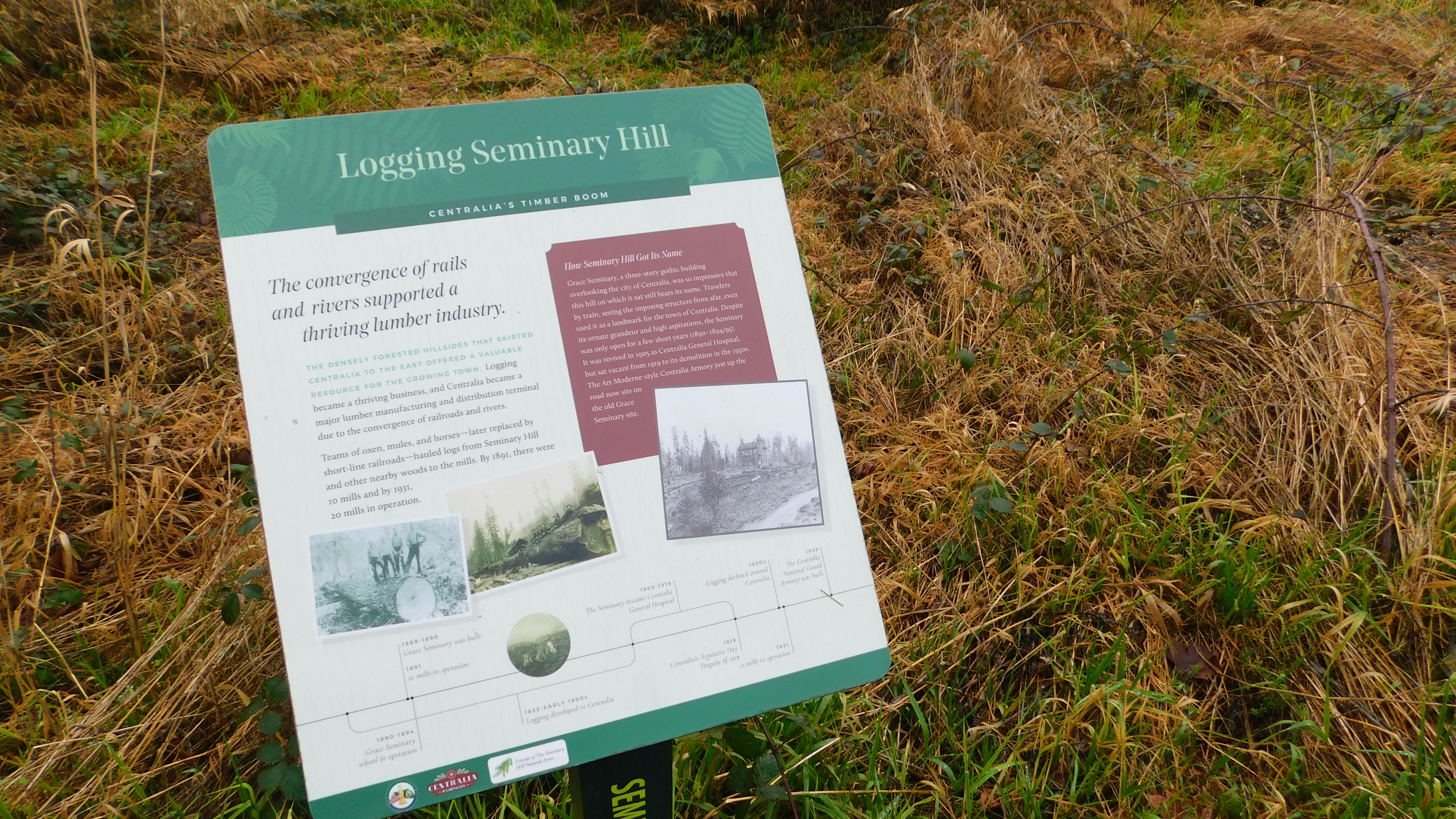
Interpretive panel, logging, 2026

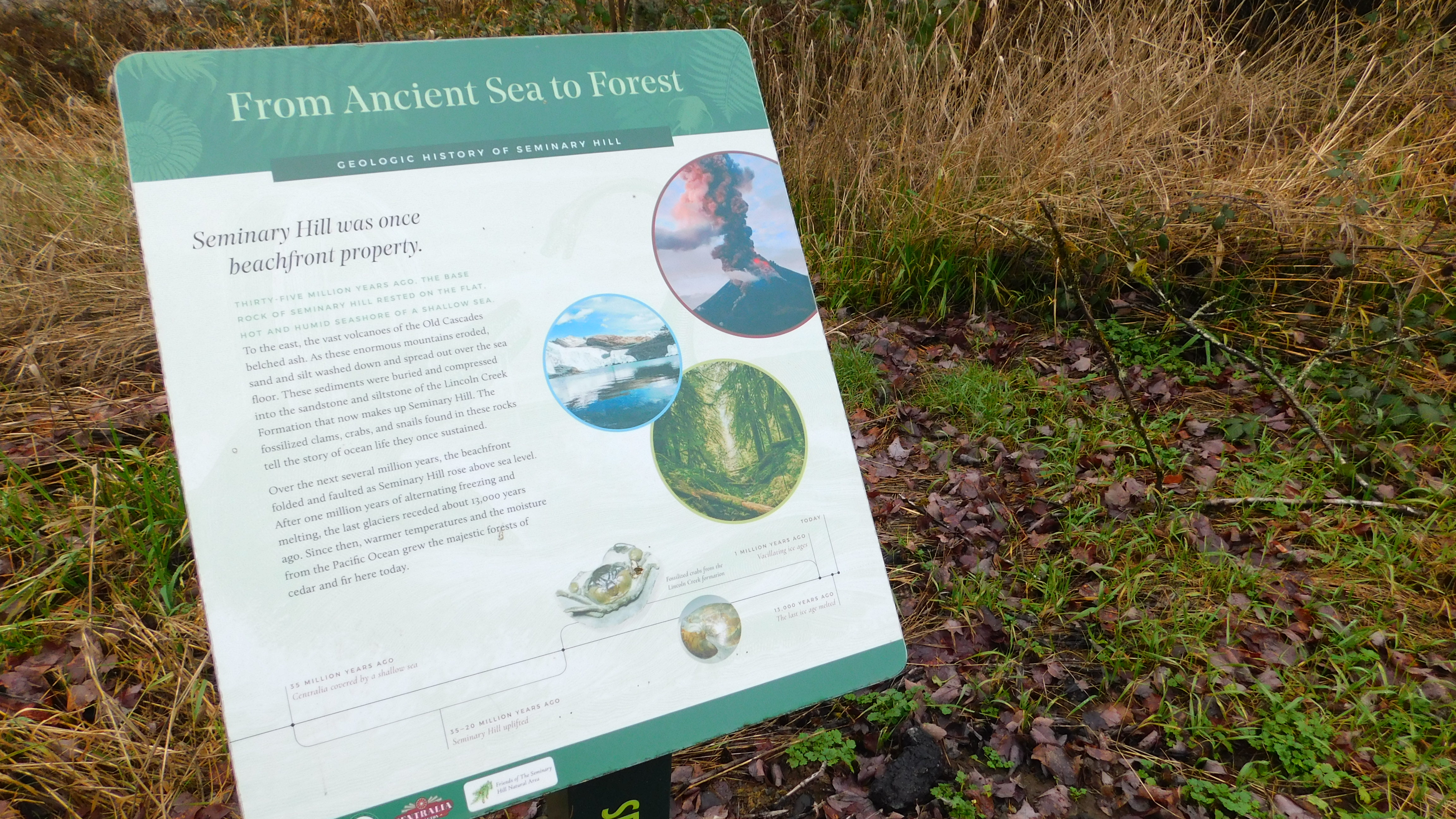
Interpretive panel, geologic history, 2026

=== Trails ===
The trail system consists of several, short loops spanning more than 2 miles (3.2 km). (Note: The trail mileage of Seminary Hill Natural Area varies, often vaguely as over 2 miles (3.2 km) and up to 2.5 miles (4.0 km). See sources throughout the article for the discrepancy.) Some portions are considered to have steep pitches, but overall, the trails are listed as level-to-moderate. The trails are often designated with granite markers. The beginning trailhead starts with an uphill verge and hikers are able to choose between the Indian Pipe Trail, or the Canyon Trail, which heads to the Centralia reservoir. Benches are located along the trails, and there are minor picnic and bathroom facilities. An accessible trail is located in the valley below the hill.

A trail map, made of cut steel, is located at the main trailhead of the natural area. Featuring the network of pathways in the park, the map also includes elevation gain. The main loop spans 1.3 miles (2.1 km) with an elevation gain of 290 feet (88 m). The Grand Fir Trail crosses the location of Girl Scout camps from the mid-20th century.

From Indian Pipe or Staebler Point off the Rufus Kaiser Trail, hikers can overlook downtown Centralia and view Centralia Union Depot. Landforms that can be viewed include the Black Hills, the Chehalis Valley, Capitol Peak, and the Olympic Mountains, as well as Baw Faw Peak and the Willapa Hills. (Note: In a Seattle Times news article from 2000, the writer describes the skyline of Centralia to be a "far less glamourous" view.) It is possible for visitors to view Mount St. Helens on a clear day.

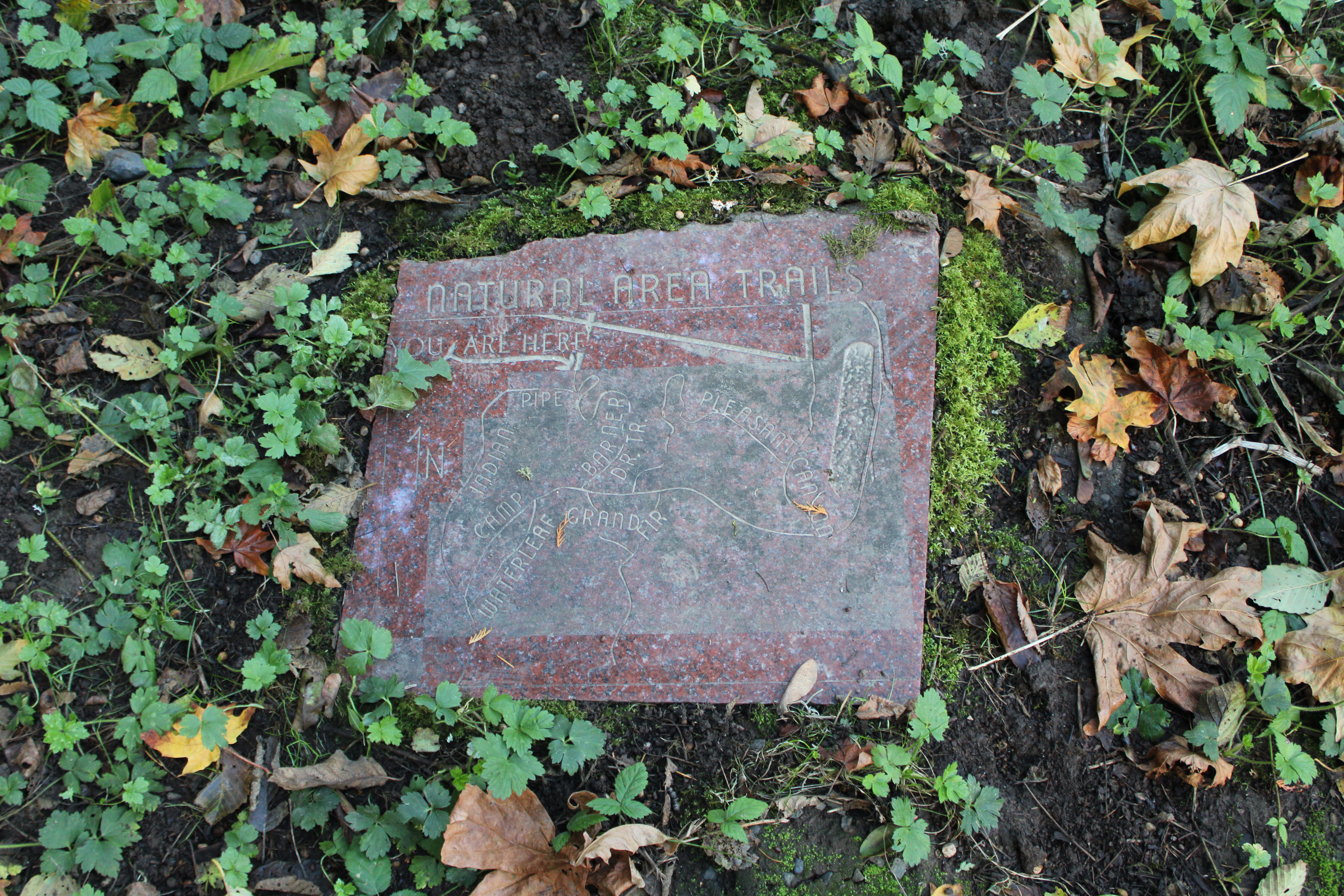
Trail marker, 2025

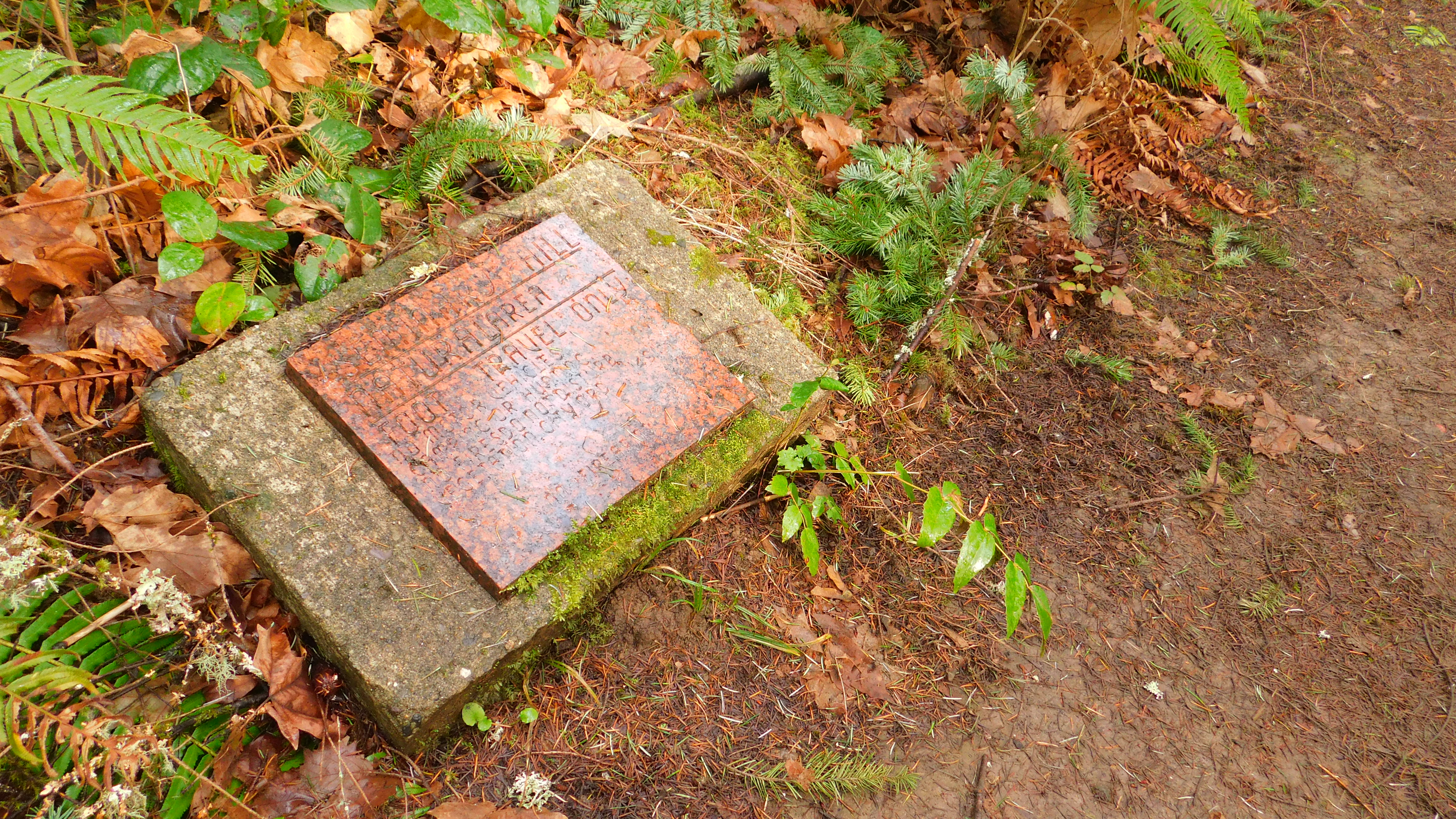
Trail marker, 2026

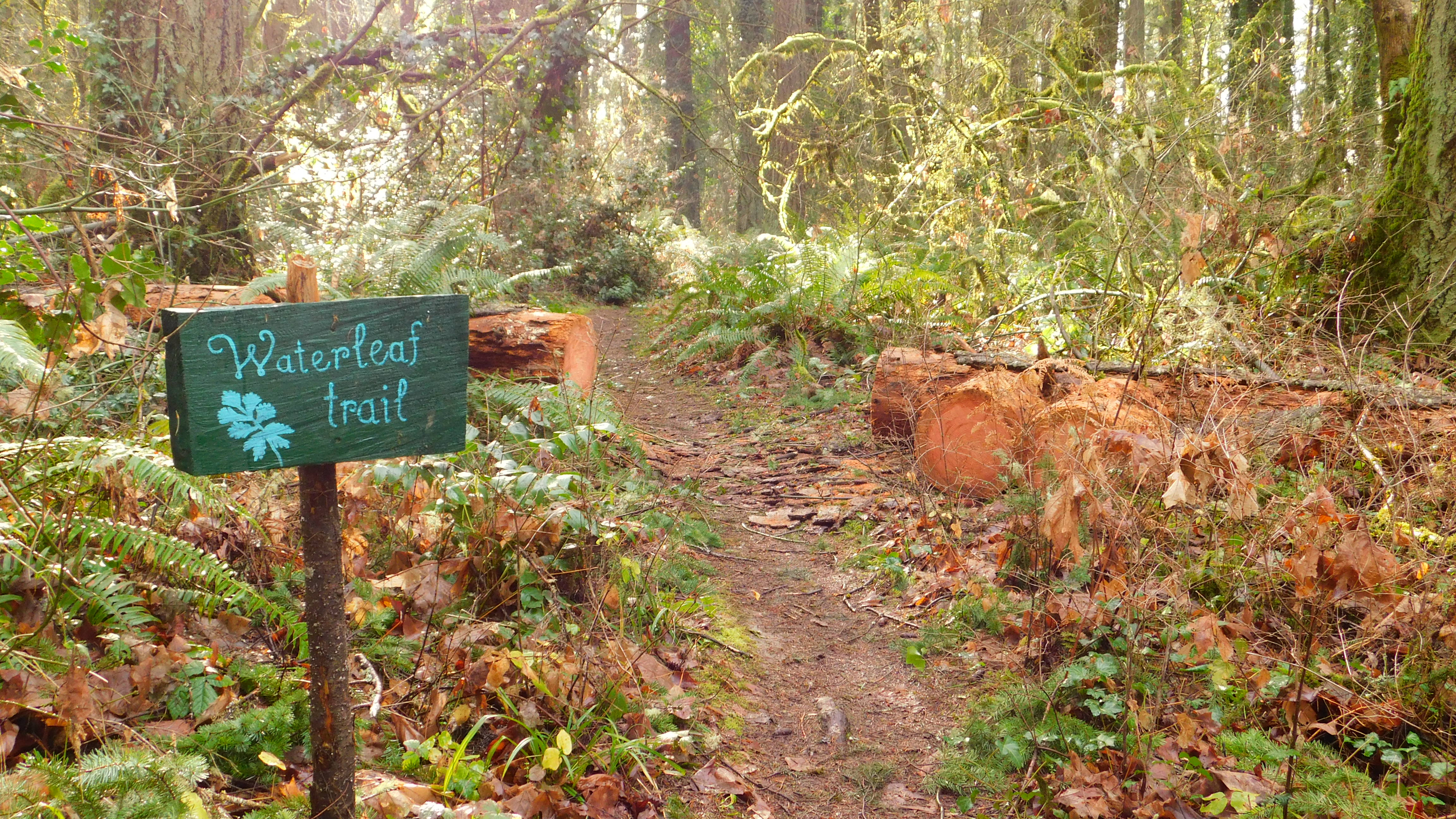
Trail marker, 2026

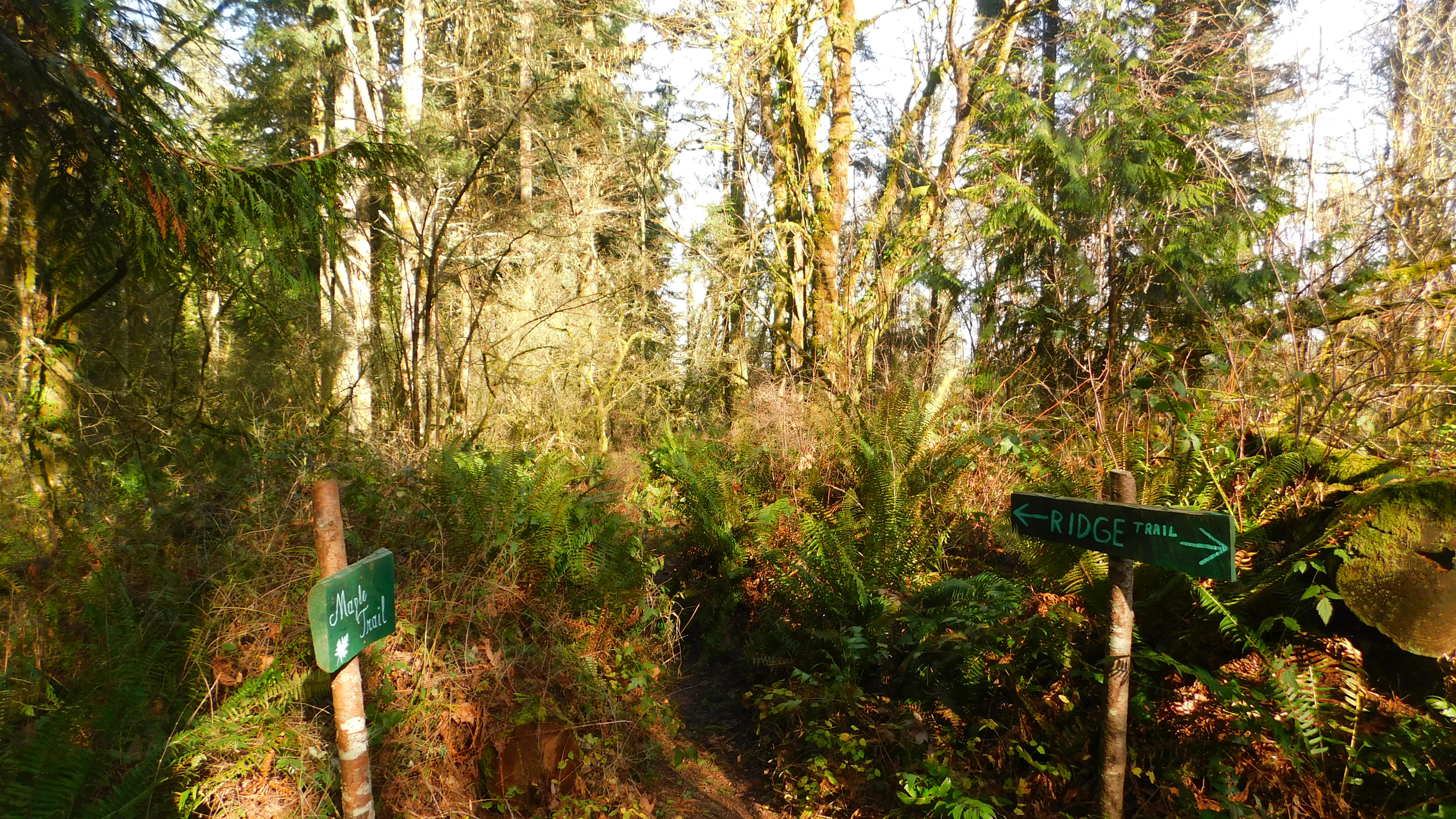
Trail markers and forest, 2026

== Environment and ecology ==
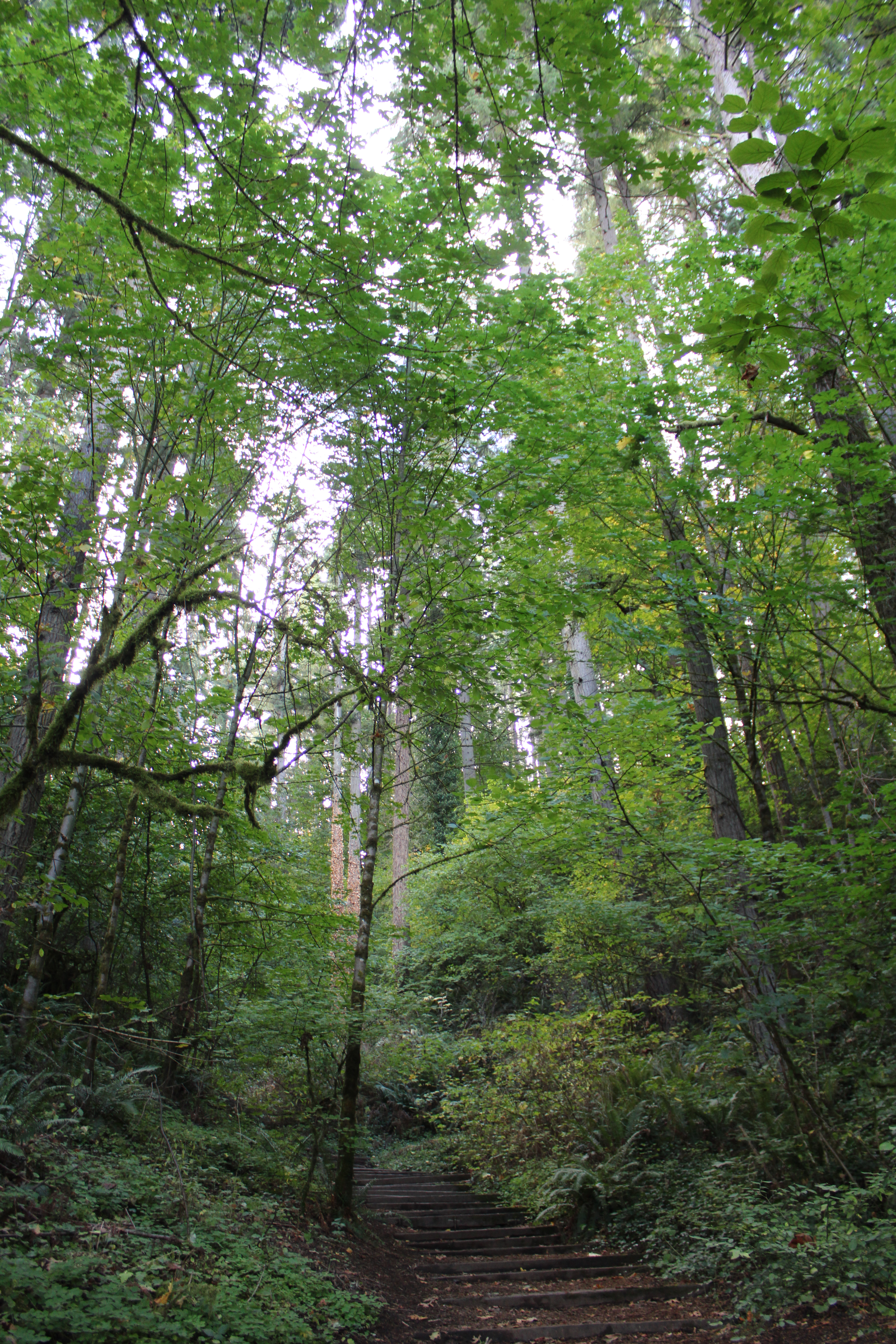
Trailhead and second growth forest, 2025

The second-growth forest of the natural area contains over 400 species of flora, including maidenhair and sword ferns that grow from nursing logs as well as cicely, salmon berry and trillium. Other plants include huckleberry, Pacific waterleaf, and slender toothwort. Mushrooms are found in the preserve, including edible species such as deer mushroom.

The biome contains a mixture of big leaf and vine maples, dogwood, red alder, and wild cherry. Most of the canopy is Douglas fir, along with western red cedar and hemlock. Cedar stumps, remaining from the hill's logging era, are located throughout the park. By the late-2010s, some trees were thought to be up to 120 years old. The understory is noted to contain native blackberry, Inside-out flower, Oregon grape, rhododendrons, and salal.

The natural area is not a permanent home to any large animals, but smaller creatures, commonly deer mouse and Douglas squirrel, as well deer, moles, opossums, racoons, and skunks, are found in the forest. Bear are sometimes spotted in the area. Along with various songbirds, dozens of bird species are listed at the natural area, such as owls, ravens, and sparrows, and two species of woodpeckers, hairy and pileated. An eight-page bird guide for the natural area was first published in 2016.

Beginning in the 1990s, volunteers have undertaken an ongoing project to remove invasive plants, such as blackberry vines, English holly, and ivy, from the protected area. By 2000, 85 invasive plant species were noted in the natural area. At times, the task has been joined with crews from AmeriCorps and inmates from Lewis County Jail. In the 2020s, the Washington Trails Association has led work parties, usually staffed with members of the military or veterans, for additional maintenance and protection of the park, trail system, and the environment.

The Friends of Seminary Hill Natural Area have led a multi-year effort to replant a valley in the park, located below the hill, with native plants and trees. After the 1991 reservoir collapse, the basin was overtaken with invasive plants such as blackberries and reed canarygrass, and covered in a layer of clay and mud, making regrowth of a forest difficult. In 2026, over 100 shrubs and trees of various species were planted, which included red cedar and sequoia.

== Recognition ==
In 2014, the Friends of Seminary Hill Natural Area association received the Urban Forest Stewardship Award from the Washington State Department of Natural Resources (WSDNR) and Washington Community Forestry Council. The award was the first ever issued by the joint groups.
