= Snow Lake (Mount Rainier) =

Lake in Lewis County, Washington, USA

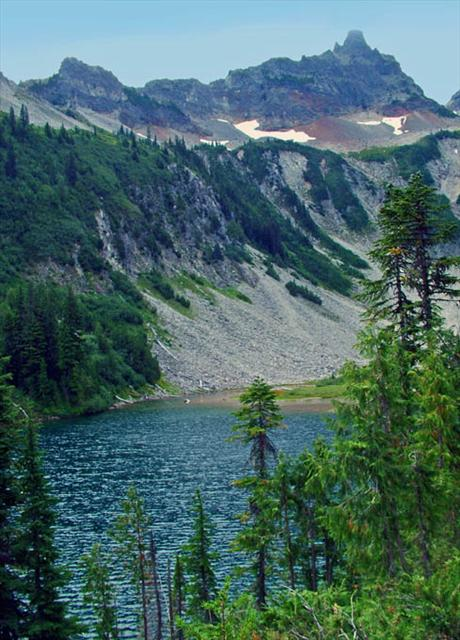
- Snow Lake, Mount Rainier National Park

- Location within Washington (state) Location within the United States
- Location: Mount Rainier National Park, Lewis County, Washington, US
- Coordinates: 46°45′26″N 121°41′53″W
- Basin countries: United States
- Surface elevation: 4,685 feet (1,428 m)

Snow Lake is a lake in Lewis County, Washington. It is within Mount Rainier National Park. It is in a glacial cirque below Unicorn Peak, in the Tatoosh Range.

It also has a hiking trail, spanning about seven miles.

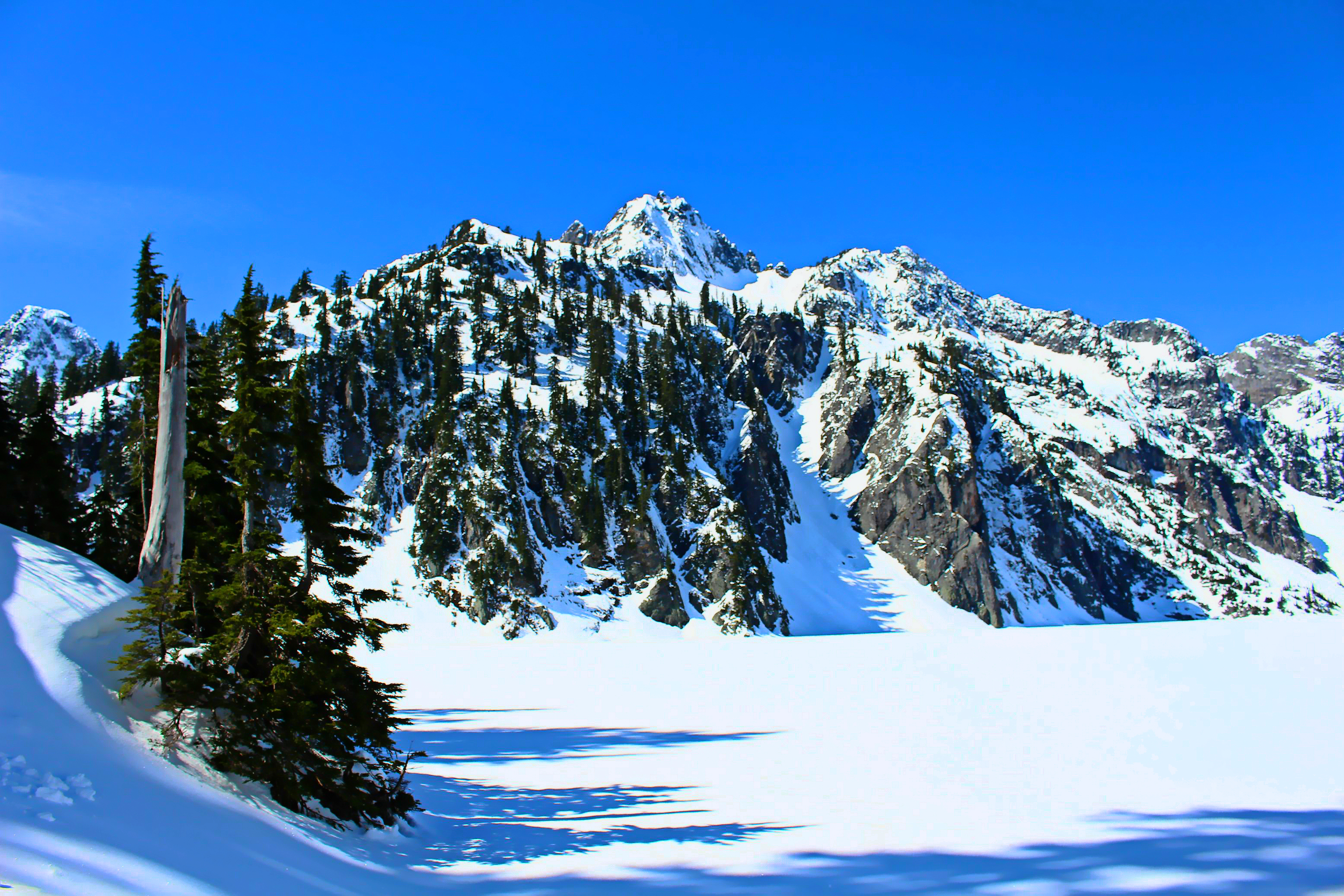
Snow Lake, 2015

== See also ==
- List of geographic features in Lewis County, Washington
- List of lakes in Washington
