= Bench Lake =

Lake in Washington State, U.S.

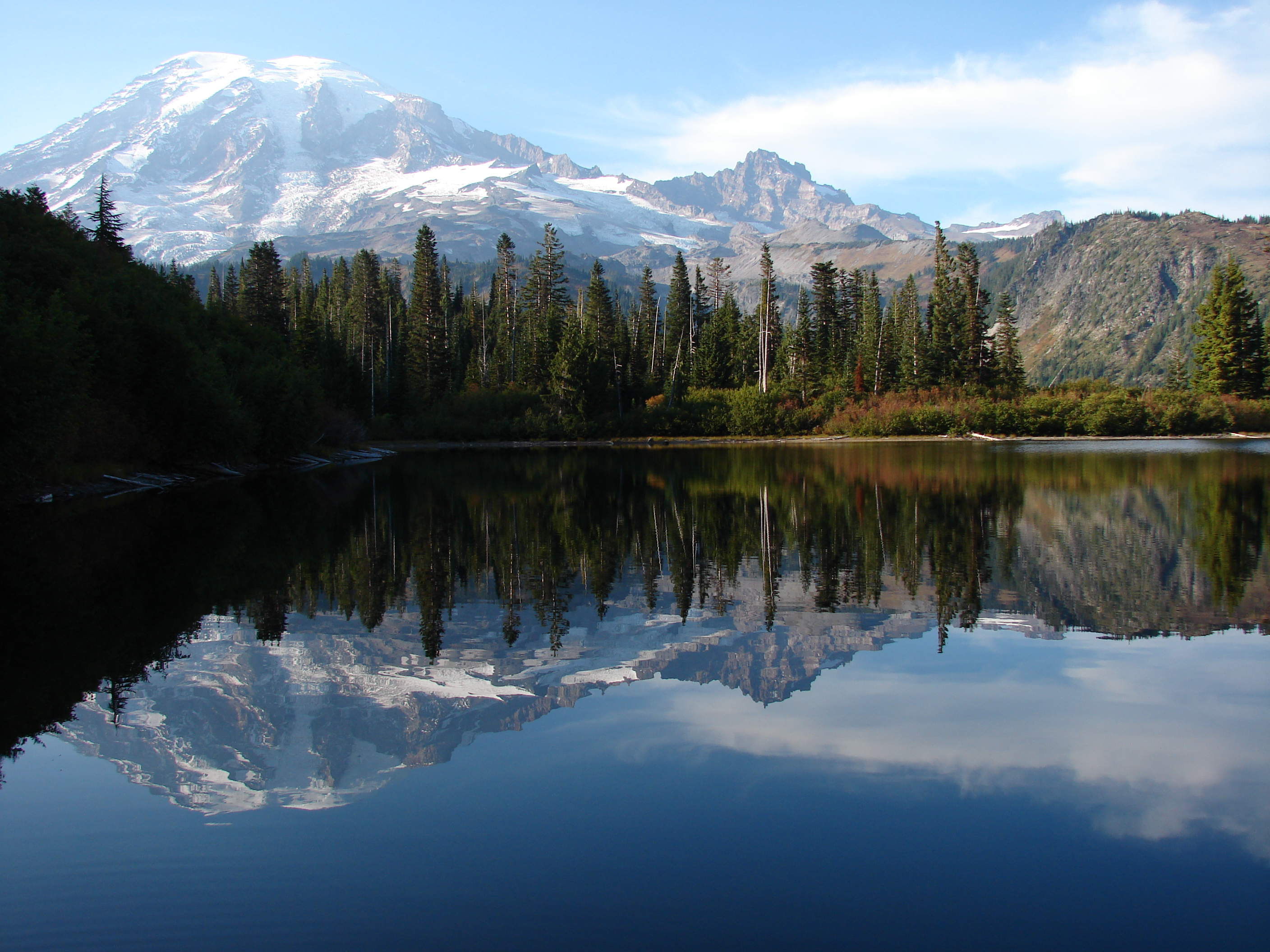

- Location within Washington (state) Location within the United States
- Location: Lewis County, Washington
- Coordinates: 46.76276°N 121.6983°W
- Basin countries: United States
- Surface area: 2.90 acres (1.17 ha)
- Surface elevation: 4,180 ft (1,270 m)
- Islands: 0

Bench Lake is a freshwater lake located on the north skirt of Unicorn Peak along the Tatoosh Range in Lewis County, Washington. Along with neighboring Snow Lake, they are considered some of the most visited lakes in the Alpine Lakes Wilderness. The lake is also stocked with rainbow trout for fishing. The lake sits in a broad meadow called The Bench from which it got its name.

== See also ==
- List of geographic features in Lewis County, Washington
- List of lakes of the Alpine Lakes Wilderness
- List of lakes in Washington
