= Doty Hills =

Land mass in southwest Washington, US

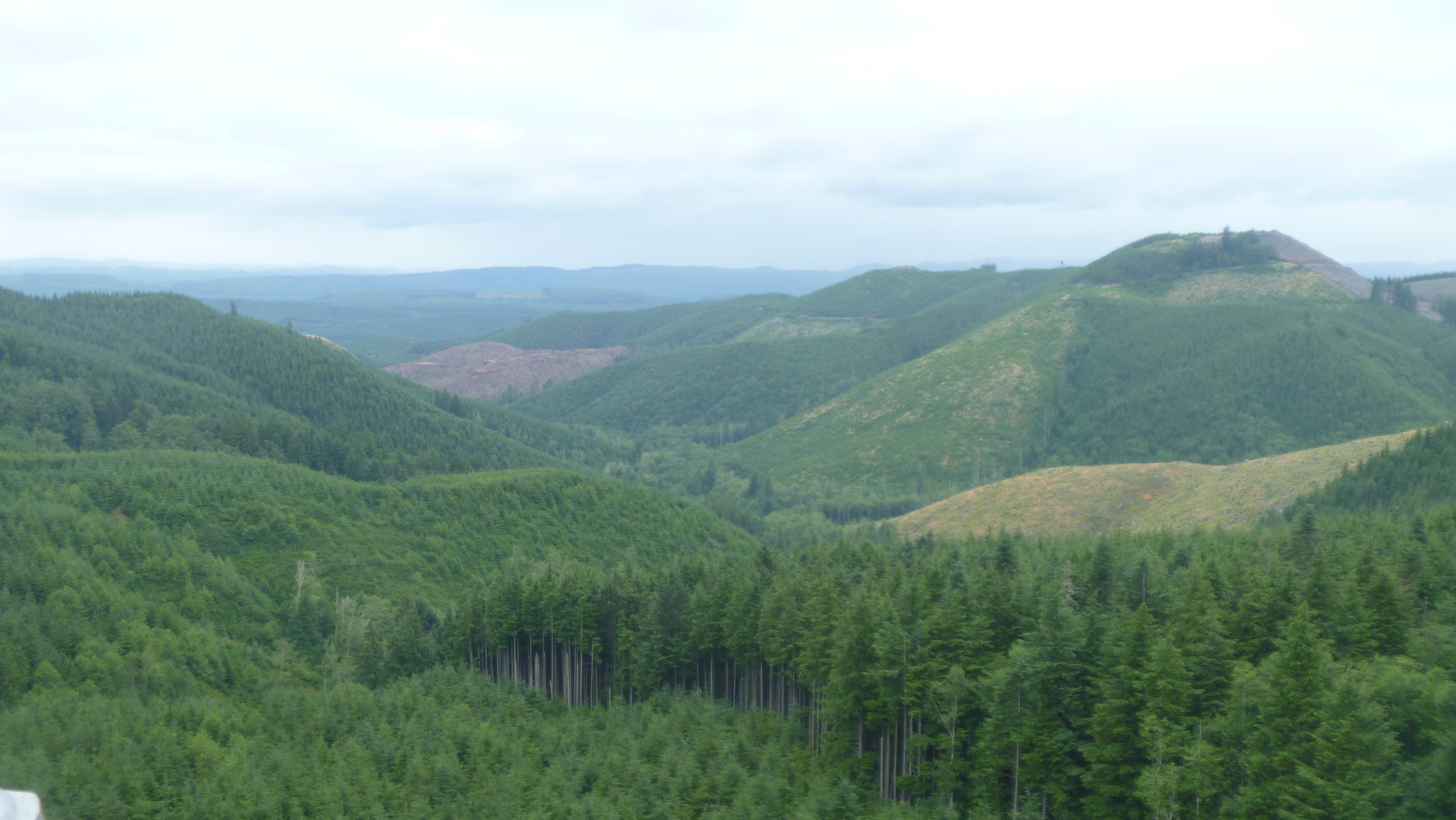
- Forestry in the Doty Hills

Highest point
- Peak: Unnamed peak
- Elevation: 2,487 ft (758 m)
- Coordinates: 46°42′35″N 123°19′21″W

Geography
- Location within Washington (state)
- Country: United States
- State: Washington
- Region: Western Washington
- Range coordinates: 46°42′35″N 123°19′21″W
- Parent range: Willapa Hills

Geology
- Rock type: Tertiary volcanic

The Doty Hills are hills in Lewis County and Grays Harbor County in southwest Washington. The hills lie north of Doty, Washington and west of Chehalis, between the Black Hills to their north and the Willapa Hills to their south. They are considered part of the Willapa Hills physiographic province.

== Geography and geology ==
The highest point in the Doty Hills, an unnamed 2,487-foot (758 m) summit, appears in the list of Washington State's top 200 peaks by topographic prominence.

The geology of the hills is Tertiary volcanic rock. Augite crystals can be found in the hills amongst porphyry tuff. Natrolite has been found at Lincoln Creek in the hills.

== Natural resources ==
=== Forestry ===
Forestry is practiced on conifer tree farms in the unpopulated hills, which receive over 80 inches (2,000 mm) annual precipitation, and possess a cool, cloudy climate. Native tree species include Pacific silver fir, Douglas fir, and western hemlock.

=== Wind power ===
In 2009, a 120 megawatt wind farm called Coyote Crest Wind Park was proposed in the Doty Hills. It was to be built on tree farm land leased from Weyerhaeuser, and would be the first large wind farm in the Pacific Northwest coastal hills. In November 2013, the developer put the project on hold due to insufficient demand for renewable energy.

== See also ==
- List of geographic features in Lewis County, Washington
