= Boistfort Peak =

Mountain in Washington, United States

- Location within Washington (state)

Highest point
- Elevation: 3,113 ft (949 m) NAVD 88
- Prominence: 2,680 ft (820 m)
- Coordinates: 46°29′17″N 123°12′55″W

Geography
- Location: Lewis County, Washington, U.S.
- Parent range: Willapa Hills, Pacific Coast Ranges
- Topo map: USGS Boistfort Peak

Boistfort Peak, also called Baw Faw Peak, is a peak in the Willapa Hills in Washington state. The summit was once the site of a fire lookout and is the highest point in the Willapa Hills. Today it has communication antennae including the K7PG 2-meter ham repeater. It also is the site of station BOW in the Pacific Northwest Seismic Network.

== See also ==
- List of geographic features in Lewis County, Washington
