= Pinnacle Glacier (Lewis County, Washington) =

Glacier in Washington, United States

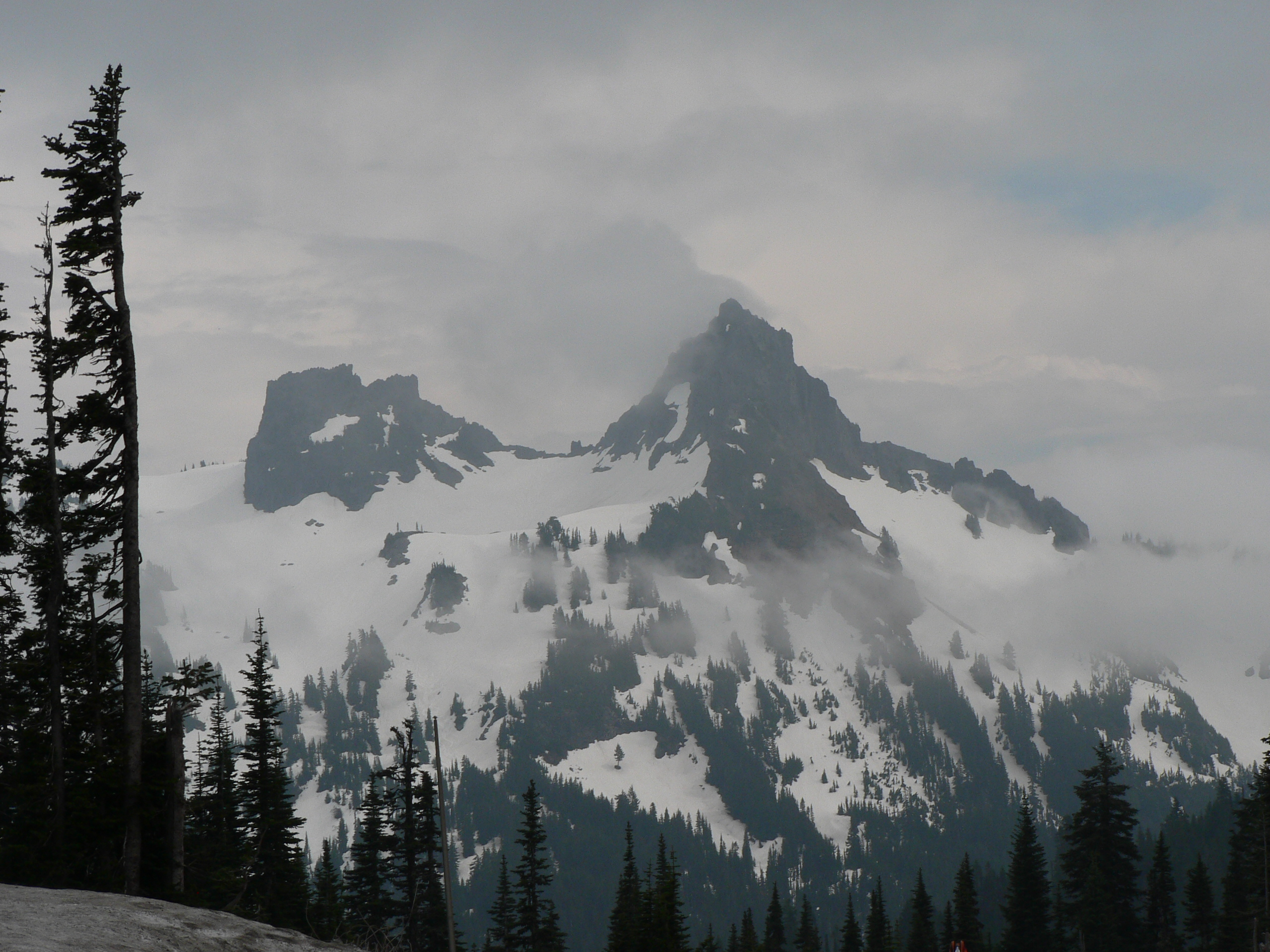
- Pinnacle Glacier in June 2009

- Location within Washington (state)
- Type: Cirque glacier
- Location: Lewis County, Washington, U.S.
- Coordinates: 46°45′27″N 121°43′50″W
- Length: 300 ft (91 m)
- Terminus: Proglacial lake
- Status: Retreating

Pinnacle Glacier is in Mount Rainier National Park in the U.S. state of Washington, on the northeast slopes of Pinnacle Peak. Pinnacle Glacier is 6 mi (9.7 km) south of Mount Rainier and is a small remnant glacier that has developed a proglacial lake as it has retreated.

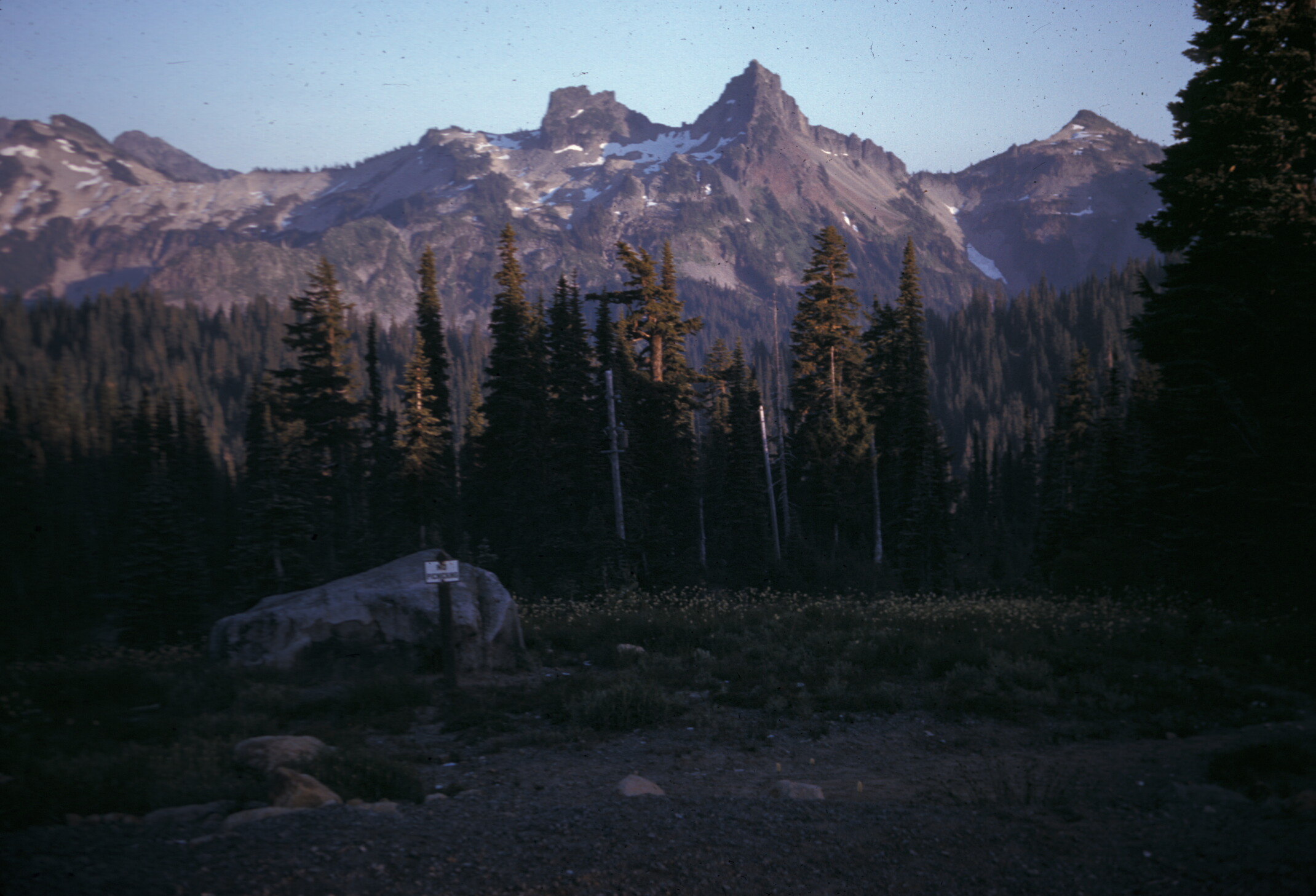
Pinnacle Glacier shown in retreat in May 2017

== See also ==
- List of geographic features in Lewis County, Washington
- List of glaciers in the United States
