= High Rock (Washington) =

Mountain in Washington (state), United States

- High Rock, from Cora Lake, 2026

Highest point
- Elevation: 5,689 ft (1,734 m)
- Prominence: 3,145 ft (959 m)
- Isolation: 6.11 mi (9.83 km)
- Coordinates: 46°41′4″N 121°54′5″W

Geography
- Location within Washington (state)
- Location: Lewis County; Washington, United States
- Parent range: Cascade Range

High Rock is a mountain summit located in the Cascade Range, in the U.S. state of Washington.

== See also ==
- List of geographic features in Lewis County, Washington
