= KWJZ-LP =

- High Rock, Washington; United States
- Frequency: 107.3 MHz

Programming
- Format: Oldies

Ownership
- Owner: Continental Broadcasting

History
- First air date: 2005
- Former call signs: KCFL-LP (2005–2009); KBSG-LP (2009–2010)
- Former frequencies: 104.5 MHz (2006–2017)

Technical information
- Licensing authority: FCC
- Facility ID: 134276
- Class: L1
- ERP: 100 watts
- HAAT: 26 meters
- Transmitter coordinates: 47°43′36″N 121°57′15″W

Links
- Public license information: LMS

KWJZ-LP (107.3 FM) is a radio station licensed to serve High Rock, Washington, United States. The station is owned by Continental Broadcasting. The station was originally located in Fall City, hence the original call letters. The station was originally on 104.5 FM.

The station was assigned the KWJZ-LP call letters by the Federal Communications Commission on December 12, 2012.

== See also ==
- KYA Radio
